= Ricardo Rodriguez (wrestler) =

Mexican-American professional wrestler, manager, and commentator (born 1986)

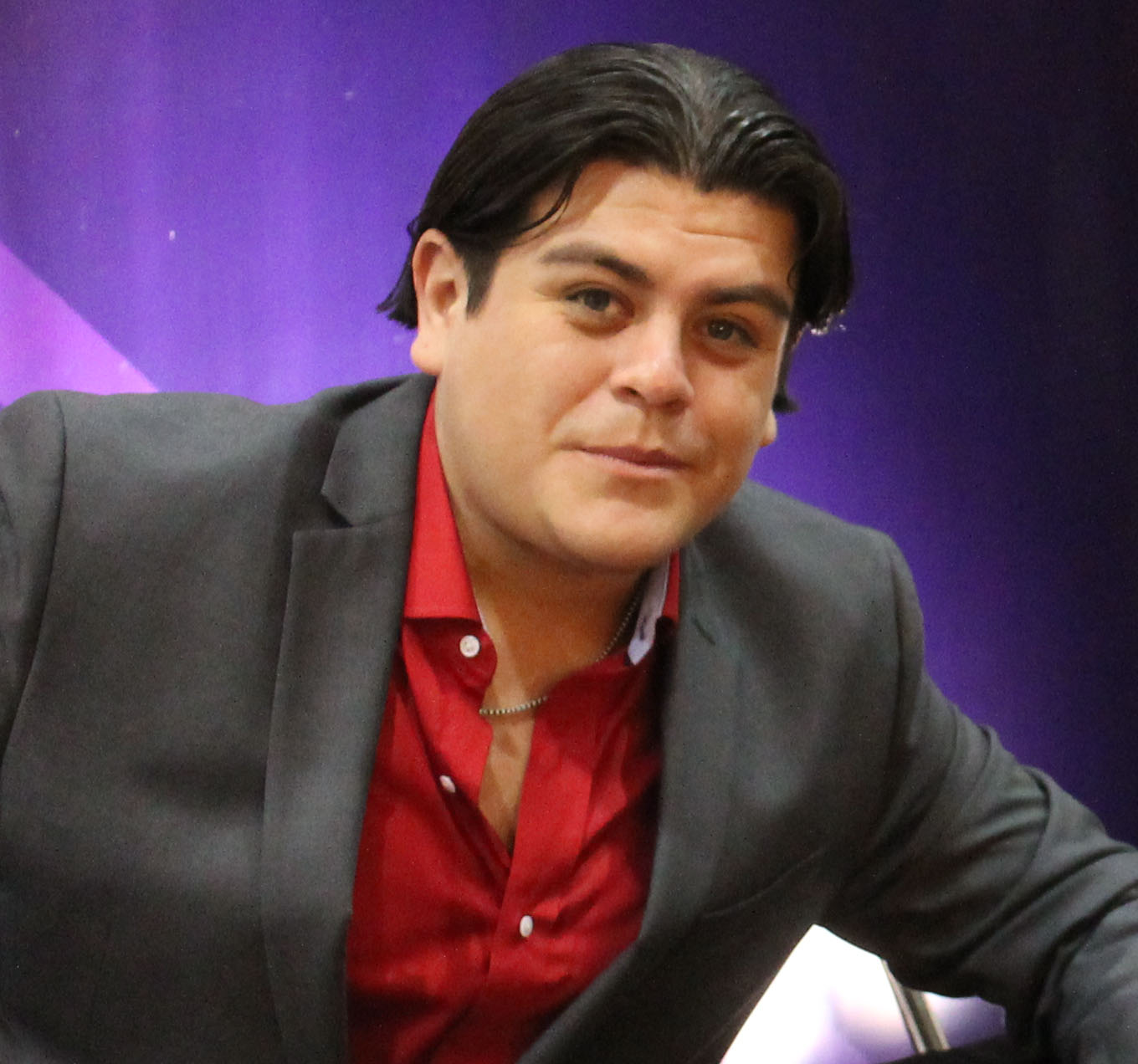
- Rodriguez in 2014

Personal information
- Born: Jesús Ricardo Rodríguez; February 17, 1986 (age 40) Los Angeles, California, U.S.

Professional wrestling career
- Ring name(s): Chimaera; El Local; Jesse Long; Jesús Rodriguez; Ricardo Rodriguez
- Billed height: 6 ft 0 in (1.83 m)
- Billed weight: 225 lb (102 kg)
- Billed from: Guadalajara, Mexico; San Luis Potosí, Mexico
- Trained by: Black Pearl; Gangrel; Latigo Blanco; Nemesis; Phoenix Star; The Stepfather; Zokre
- Debut: August 11, 2006

Jesús Ricardo Rodríguez (born February 17, 1986) is an American professional wrestler and commentator, primarily performing for Major League Wrestling (MLW). He is best known for his time in WWE under the ring name Ricardo Rodriguez. He returned to the independent circuit in 2014 as Chimaera. He also worked as an announcer for Combate Americas and as a manager for Alberto del Rio wrestling promotion Nación Lucha Libre before its closure in January 2020. He has also worked as a Spanish language commentator for AEW.

== Professional wrestling career ==
=== Early career (2006–2010) ===
Before wrestling for independent California promotions, Rodriguez wrestled with other upcoming wrestlers in backyards for BBW Beyond Backyard Wrestling. He wrestled for various promotions as the masked wrestler Chimaera, and his professional wrestling debut came at UEW's 1st Annual West Coast Cruiser Cup Tournament on August 11, 2006. At Pro Wrestling Affiliates, Chimaera lost to Charles Mercury in the first round of a PWA Light Heavyweight Championship tournament. Chimaera and Jason Watts teamed up to take on the NWPW Tag Team Champions Aerial Star and Ric Ellis and initially lost, but beat them for the championship on October 4, 2008. They lost the title in a two-on-one handicap match to Ryan Stone. On August 2, 2009, he had a three-way match for the AWS Lightweight Championship, with Peter Avalon and Chris Kadillak. In Chikara, he participated in the Young Lions Cup VII and was eliminated by KC Day. At Dragon Gate USA, Chimaera competed in a Dragon Gate Fray match which was won by Brad Allen on March 26, 2010. For Deutsche Wrestling Allianz Chimaera had two championship opportunities one for the DWA Cruiserweight Championship and one for DWA Tag Team Championship. He also participated in Vendetta Pro Triforce Championship tournament and beat Brian Cage and Jason Watts in the final for the vacant Vendetta Pro Triforce Championship and vacated the championship when he signed with WWE. He also participated in the World War III 159 Man battle royal. Rodriguez was also a trainer for California based promotion, Fit Pit Pro Wrestling. He has also wrestled in So Cal Pro, EMLL, CWX, NWPW, NWT/NTLL, BPW, the West Coast Wrestling Company, Vendetta Pro and in both IWL and LLII as Jesse Long.

=== World Wrestling Entertainment / WWE (2010–2014) ===
==== Florida Championship Wrestling (2010–2011) ====
Rodriguez, as Chimaera, debuted in Florida Championship Wrestling on December 2, 2010, in a ten-man tag match, teaming with Husky Harris, Buck Dixon, Matt Clements, and Kenny Li to defeat Big E Langston, Darren Young, James Bronson, Kevin Hackman, and Roman Leakee. On December 17, 2010, Chimaera lost to Richie Steamboat.

From 2011, he competed in FCW under the Ricardo Rodriguez gimmick. On August 28, 2011, Rodriguez said that Alberto Del Rio was an employee of his father's agency. Rodriguez formed a stable called the Ascension with Conor O'Brian, Tito Colón, Kenneth Cameron, and Raquel Diaz. However, by September 26, the Ascension no longer associated with him, as a video package promoting the Ascension only featured the latter four Ascension members without Rodriguez, and when the Ascension had their first match together in October, Rodriguez did not accompany them.

==== Alberto Del Rio's ring announcer (2010–2013) ====
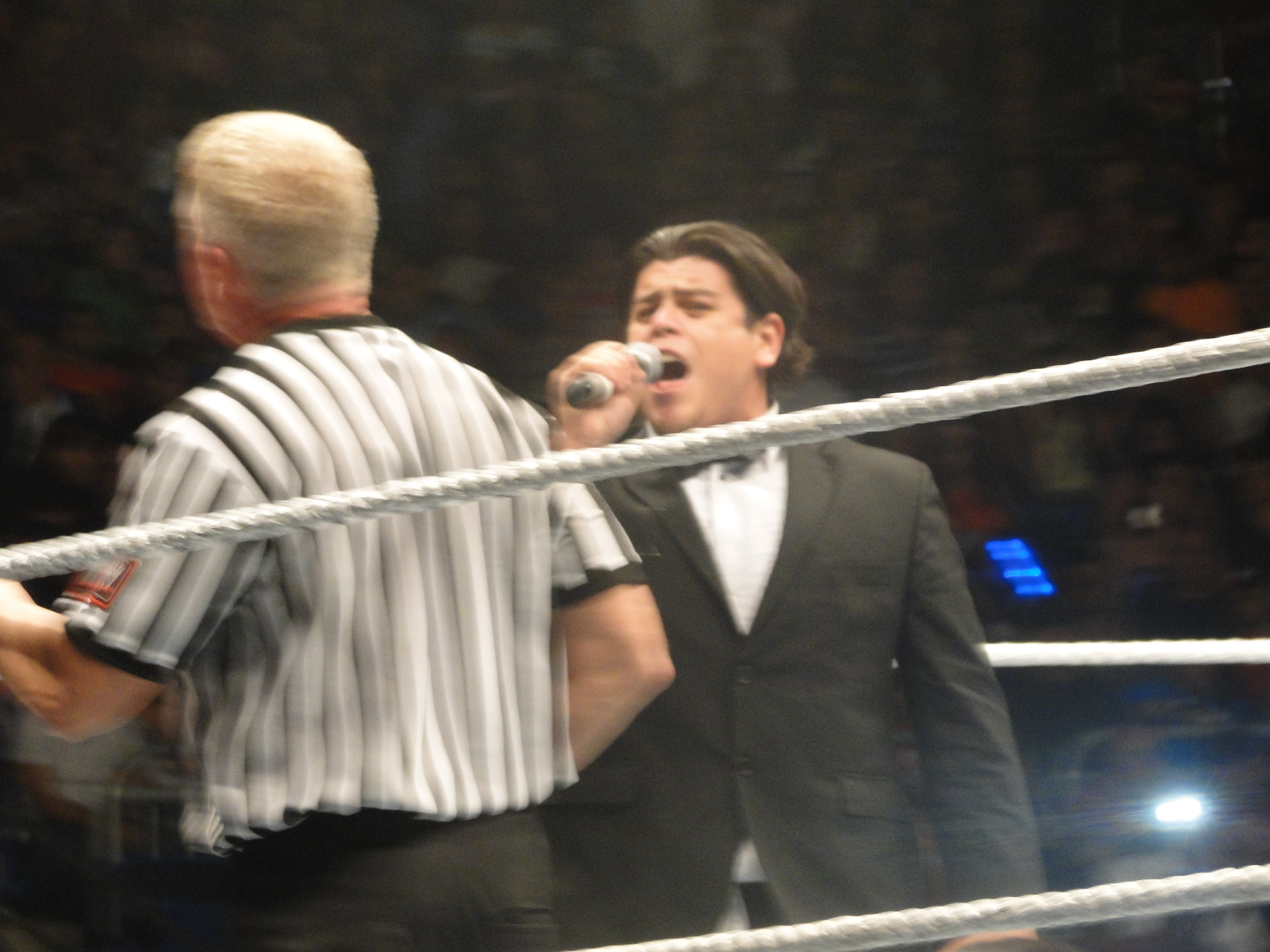
Ricardo Rodriguez announcing Alberto Del Rio to the ring at a WWE live event in 2011

Rodriguez debuted in the WWE on the SmackDown brand on August 20, 2010, as a personal ring announcer to Alberto Del Rio. As well as being the personal ring announcer, Rodriguez also helped Del Rio win matches by distracting his opponents.

On the January 4, 2011 episode of NXT, Rodriguez took Del Rio's place in a battle royal for the NXT Pros, and was quickly eliminated by R-Truth. On NXT, Rodriguez feuded with Del Rio's Rookie, Conor O'Brian, after he claimed a rat problem. On the January 18 episode of NXT, Rodriguez and O'Brian brawled backstage, setting up Rodriguez's WWE singles debut, which he won. After the match, O'Brian was eliminated from NXT. Del Rio later gained a new Rookie, Brodus Clay, after Clay won a match which allowed him to change his Pro. Del Rio "temporarily" passed Pro responsibilities of Clay to Rodriguez on the February 1 episode of NXT but never returned for the rest of the season, so Rodriguez managed to coach Clay to a second-place finish in the season finale on March 1.

At the 2011 WWE Draft, Rodriguez and Del Rio were drafted to the Raw brand; the duo clashed with Big Show when Rodriguez ran over Big Show's leg by using Del Rio's car. On June 6, Rodriguez masqueraded as Big Show as Del Rio mocked Big Show. On his return to Raw on June 13, Big Show attacked Del Rio. Rodriguez came to his employee's aid and he was brutally attacked which caused him to take time off for an injury. Rodriguez returned on July 18, 2011 On August 30 episode of SmackDown, when John Cena called out Del Rio, Rodriguez walked out alone to reply to Cena. Rodriguez spoke in a mixture of English and Spanish, explaining that Del Rio was not present. Cena then asked Rodriguez to deliver a message to Del Rio, and then promptly punched Rodriguez in the face. On the September 12 episode of Raw SuperShow, Rodriguez wrestled his first match for the brand, teaming with Del Rio to lose to John Cena and Bret Hart.

At TLC: Tables, Ladders and Chairs, Rodriguez tried to help Del Rio regain the WWE Championship during Del Rio's Triple Threat Tables, Ladders, and Chairs match. Rodriguez climbed to the top of a ladder in the ring to try to reach the WWE Championship hanging above the ring, but Del Rio's opponents, CM Punk and The Miz, tipped the ladder over such that Rodriguez fell out of the ring and crashed through a table at ringside. Rodriguez's fall was described by critics as dangerous and scary-looking, as well as "the major moment of the show". Fellow professional wrestler Mick Foley, well known for his participation in various dangerous matches, also commented that it was "one heck of a bump". On the January 9, 2012 episode of Raw SuperShow, when Del Rio was absent, The Miz bullied Rodriguez into insulting and calling out R-Truth. R-Truth came out and made Rodriguez sing La Cucaracha. After that, R-Truth delivered his finisher to Rodriguez. At the 2012 Royal Rumble event, Rodriguez participated in the Royal Rumble match, entering at #8. He and Mick Foley eliminated Justin Gabriel, after which Rodriguez was eliminated by Santino Marella.

On the May 21 episode of Raw SuperShow, Santino Marella criticised Rodriguez's announcing and then attacked Rodriguez. Rodriguez unsuccessfully challenged Marella to a match on the May 25 SmackDown. On the June 8 SmackDown, to tie in with Del Rio's feud with World Heavyweight Champion Sheamus, Rodriguez dressed up as Sheamus and mocked Sheamus' mannerisms. Rodriguez's portrayal of Sheamus was praised from critics and fans alike. On the June 11 episode of Raw SuperShow, Rodriguez resumed his feud with Marella, teaming with Beth Phoenix to beat Marella and Layla. After the match, Marella embarrassed Rodriguez by ripping off Rodriguez's shirt to reveal he was wearing a Justin Bieber T-shirt underneath. Their feud ended at No Way Out, when Rodriguez lost to Marella in a non-title tuxedo match, Rodriguez's first pay-per-view singles match. In September 2012, during Del Rio's feud with Sheamus, Rodriguez suffered a Brogue Kick from Sheamus and thus enlisted David Otunga's help as his lawyer to try and ban the Brogue Kick. Rodriguez was later pinned in a six-man tag match later that month with Del Rio and Otunga against Sheamus, Rey Mysterio and Sin Cara.

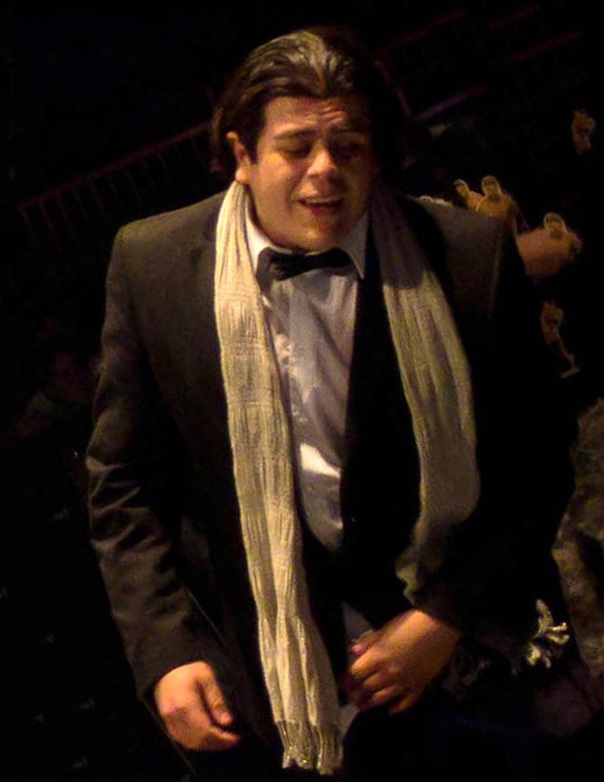
Rodriguez in 2011

Rodriguez came to the aid of the Spanish announce team at TLC: Tables, Ladders & Chairs on December 16, who were being heckled by 3MB (Drew McIntyre, Heath Slater, and Jinder Mahal). As 3MB turned on Rodriguez, Del Rio came to his aid, signalling a face turn for the duo. The turn was further cemented the next night at Raw in a similar situation as Rodriguez came to the aid of Tommy Dreamer, who was being assaulted by The Shield, but Rodriguez ended up being attacked himself. On the December 28 SmackDown, Rodriguez was randomly selected to be the next contender for Big Show's World Heavyweight Championship, but Show knocked him out backstage, starting a feud between Del Rio and Show. Rodriguez received his title match against Show on the December 31 Raw; as Rodriguez was about to lose, Del Rio interfered and attacked Show, causing Rodriguez to lose via disqualification. After Del Rio defeated Show to win the World Heavyweight Championship in January 2013, Rodriguez started bringing a bucket to the ring. During Del Rio's title defense against Show at the Royal Rumble, Rodriguez duct-taped Show's legs to the ring ropes to ensure that Del Rio won the Last Man Standing match; the next week, Show attacked Rodriguez twice. During Del Rio's next feud with Jack Swagger, Rodriguez suffered a storyline broken ankle due to Swagger's attack. On the edition of April 29 of Raw, Rodriguez defeated Zeb Colter and Big E Langston in a triple-threat match, giving Del Rio the right to choose the stipulation for his World Heavyweight Championship match at Extreme Rules.

At Payback, Del Rio reverted to being a heel by ruthlessly targeting Ziggler's head after Ziggler's recent concussion to win the World Heavyweight Championship. Rodriguez was suspended for 30 days for his first violation of the WWE Wellness Policy on July 2, 2013. He returned to television on the August 5 episode of Raw, but after he inadvertently cost Del Rio a non-title match against Rob Van Dam, Del Rio viciously assaulted Rodriguez.

Rodriguez returned on the August 19 episode of Raw, revealing that he now worked for Rob Van Dam. The next week on Raw, Rodriguez cost Del Rio a match against Van Dam, and as per match stipulation, Van Dam would get a shot at Del Rio's World Heavyweight Championship at Night of Champions. Just days before the event, Vickie Guerrero who was acting in authority, stated that Rodriguez would not be allowed at ringside for the title match at Night of Champions. He was also forced to wrestle Del Rio on SmackDown, and he lost. On October 7, he defeated Del Rio, who attacked him after the match. Van Dam and Rodriguez ended their alliance after Van Dam's feud with Del Rio, as he ceased to accompany him to the ring and ring announcing him since after Van Dam returned in April 2014.

==== Los Locales and PPV commentator (2012–2014) ====
Rodriguez started to wrestle as the masked luchador El Local, who remained distinct from his ring announcer character, debuting on the November 3 episode of Saturday Morning Slam in a loss to Sin Cara. In late 2013, El Local began teaming up with another masked competitor (Tyson Kidd) to form Los Locales, a team which never won a match. During this time, Rodriguez became a commentator for the Spanish broadcast team for WWE pay-per-views. In May 2014, Rodriguez (as El Local) formed a tag team with the debuting Kalisto on NXT, in a winning effort against The Legionnaires (Marcus Louis and Sylvester Lefort). Rodriguez was released by WWE on July 30, 2014.

=== Return to the independent circuit (2014–present) ===
On August 30, 2014, Rodríguez made his debut for the World Wrestling Council (WWC), mocking Ray González. On September 7, 2014 at Septiembre Negro, was defeated by González.Weiner In October 2014, Rodríguez ordered Shawn Hernandez to attack Ray González. The feud ended eventually in a Tables Match between Shawn Hernandez and Ray González in Aniversario 2014. On January 24, 2015, at Hora de la Verdad, Rodriguez defeated Carlos Cotto to win the WWC Puerto Rico Heavyweight Championship. However, he lost the title against the former champion on February 21, 2015.

On November 28, 2014, Rodriguez made his debut for Mexican promotion AAA, reassuming the role of Alberto Del Rio's (then El Patrón Alberto) personal ring announcer. In October 2015, Del Rio returned to WWE without Rodriguez. In September 2015, Rodriguez was hired as trainer for The Great Khali's wrestling school in Punjab, the Continental Wrestling Entertainment. The school held its first event on December 12, 2015.

=== All Elite Wrestling (2021) ===
On October 27, 2021, Rodríguez worked as the Spanish commentator for All Elite Wrestling, taking the place left of Willie Urbina (who was fired due to racist remarks he made against Japanese wrestler Hikaru Shida). He would only appear at one taping.

=== Three Legacies Wrestling (2022–present) ===
Ricardo Rodriguez relocated to Lancaster, PA in 2022 and in September opened up his own wrestling academy called "Three Legacies Wrestling Academy". The academy features seminars and lessons from himself as well as special seminars from other WWE alumni. The academy hosts wrestling shows monthly/bi-monthly at different locations throughout Lancaster, PA.

== Personal life ==
Rodriguez is of Mexican heritage, and is fluent in both English and Spanish. He was born in Los Angeles, California. His family originates from the state of Michoacán, Mexico.

== Other media ==
Rodríguez has appeared in a number of WWE video games, including WWE '12, WWE '13, WWE 2K14 and WWE 2K15. According to a November 10, 2020 article written by Felix Upton and published on ringsidenews.com, Rodriguez attributes his getting into wrestling from meeting professionals in the industry during his time working in the adult entertainment market, which has been known to have a long-standing relationship with the professional wrestling industry. He is quoted in the article saying, “I used to work in the adult industry behind the scenes. I had to deal with a lot of people; you have to learn to be social to deal with clients, to call [other companies], whatever, so you learn to socialize. That helped out with wrestling because you socialize. Once I got out there, I got to meet promoters, meet other wrestlers, meet different people, and you have to network. So, that helped out. It was all just the confidence. It’s all the idea of faking it until you’re make it, and that’s what I did when I got signed with the WWE.”

Rodrigues is also the subject of a documentary film called "Wrestling with Recovery: The Jesus Ricardo Rodrigues Story". Directed by Christopher Dreisbach and Andrew Shankman, the film is listed on the IMDB website as being in Post Production. Bobbaconda Productions is the Producing Company.

== Championships and accomplishments ==
- Battleground Pro Wrestling
  - BPW MAX Championship (1 time)
- Insane Wrestling League
  - IWL Tag Team Championship (1 time) – with Eric Watts
- New Wave Pro Wrestling
  - NWPW Cruiserweight Championship (1 time)
  - NWPW Tag Team Championship (1 time) – with Jason Watts
- Pro Wrestling Illustrated
  - Ranked No. 434 of the top 500 singles wrestlers in the PWI 500 in 2015 and 2016
- Vendetta Pro Wrestling
  - Vendetta Pro Tri-Force Championship (1 time, inaugural)
  - Vendetta Pro Tri-Force Championship Tournament (2010)
- World Wrestling Council
  - WWC Puerto Rico Heavyweight Championship (1 time)
- Wrestling Observer Newsletter
  - Best Non-Wrestler (2011)
- Other titles
  - CWX Lucha Libre Championship (1 time)
  - NWT/NTLL Light Heavyweight Championship (1 time)
