= The Tribunal (professional wrestling) =

Professional wrestling tag team

Tag team
- Members: Sylvester Lefort / Basile Baraka; Marcus Louis / Baron Dax
- Name(s): The Legionnaires; The Tribunal
- Billed heights: Baraka: 5 ft 11 in (1.80 m); Dax: 6 ft 4 in (1.93 m)
- Combined billed weight: 444 lb (201 kg)
- Billed from: France
- Former member: Al Snow (manager)
- Debut: December 19, 2013
- Disbanded: December 10, 2016
- Years active: 2013–2016

The Tribunal was a professional wrestling tag team, which consisted of Basile Baraka and Baron Dax. They spent time in WWE, in the developmental territory NXT and TNA Wrestling.

== History ==
=== WWE (2013–2016) ===
In December 2013, Sylvester Lefort and Marcus Louis formed a tag team under the name The Legionnaires playing up a gimmick based on their French heritage. They made their debut as a tag team on December 19, 2013 in a triple threat tag team elimination match against Colin Cassady and Angelo Dawkins, and The Ascension (Konnor and Viktor), which was won by Cassady and Dawkins. On the May 8, 2014 episode of NXT, The Legionnaires were defeated by Kalisto and El Local. On August 21 episode of NXT, The Legionnaires began a feud with Enzo Amore and Colin Cassady losing to them in a tag team match. On September 11, Lefort faced Enzo Amore in a Hair vs Hair match at NXT TakeOver: Fatal 4-Way and was defeated, but did not adhere to the stipulation post-match and instead ran away, leaving his partner Marcus Louis to be shaved bald instead. The following weeks Lefort and Louis tried to get revenge on Amore and Cassady. On the October 16 episode of NXT, Louis finally snapped and turned on Lefort and attacked him during a tag match. On February 5, 2016, Lefort and Louis were released from their WWE contract.

=== Total Nonstop Action Wrestling (2016) ===
On March 17, 2016, Tom La Ruffa and Pierre Marceau made their TNA Wrestling debuts at One Night Only: Victory Road 2016 pay-per-view losing to The BroMans. On March 23, they signed a contract with Impact Wrestling, with La Ruffa being renamed Basile Baraka and Marceau being renamed Baron Dax. On the May 24 episode of Impact!, Baraka and Dax made their televised debut, attacking Grado and Mahabali Shera, and aligning themselves with Al Snow. On the following episode of Impact!, the faction revealed their name as The Tribunal. On June 12 at Slammiversary, The Tribunal defeated the team of Grado and Shera. On the June 14 episode of Impact!, The Tribunal fought in a four-way tag team match for the Impact World Tag Team Championship against Grado and Mahabali Shera, The BroMans and Decay, in a losing effort. On the June 28 episode of Impact!, The Tribunal and Al Snow were defeated by Grado, Mahabali Shera and Tyrus.

On the October 13 episode of Impact!, they attacked The Broken Hardys. On the October 20 episode of Impact!, The Tribunal were defeated by The Broken Hardys in a match for the Impact World Tag Team Championship. After the match, they were attacked by the new stable known as the Death Crew Council. On the November 10 episode of Impact!, as The Tribunal brutally attacked Al Snow, ending their alliance. On December 8 episode of Impact!, The Tribunal competed in their final match for Impact Wrestling where they lost a Double Strap match to Snow and Shera. On December 10, it was reported that The Tribunal has parted ways with Impact Wrestling.

== Championships and accomplishments ==
- Pro Wrestling Illustrated
  - PWI ranked Baron Dax #194 of the 500 best singles wrestlers in the PWI 500 in 2016
  - PWI ranked Basile Baraka #200 of the 500 best singles wrestlers in the PWI 500 in 2016
