= Enzo Amore =

American professional wrestler (born 1986)

- Amore in 2022

Personal information
- Born: Eric Arndt; December 8, 1986 (age 39) Hackensack, New Jersey, U.S.

Professional wrestling career
- Ring name(s): Enzo Amore; Eric Anthony nZo; Real1
- Billed height: 5 ft 11 in (180 cm)
- Billed weight: 200 lb (91 kg)
- Billed from: Hackensack, New Jersey
- Trained by: WWE Performance Center
- Debut: October 25, 2012

Eric Arndt (born December 8, 1986) is an American professional wrestler known as Enzo Amore.

Arndt signed a contract with WWE in 2012 and came to prominence for his partnership with Big Cass, whom he teamed with from 2013 to 2017; they won the NXT Year-End Award for Tag Team of the Year in 2015. After their split, he moved to the 205 Live brand, where he is a two-time WWE Cruiserweight Champion. Since leaving WWE in 2018, he has also embarked on a rap music career under the name Real1.

== Early life ==
Eric Arndt was born on December 8, 1986 in Hackensack, New Jersey. Arndt grew up in Waldwick, New Jersey, where he attended Julia A. Traphagen School, Crescent School and Waldwick High School, having played football at the latter school. Arndt continued his football career at Division III (NCAA) Salisbury University, playing linebacker and safety for the Sea Gulls from 2007 to 2009. Arndt ultimately earned a degree in journalism. He formerly worked as a DJ, a ticket salesman for the New York Jets, a piano mover, and a manager at a local Hooters.

== Professional wrestling career ==
=== WWE (2012–2018) ===
==== Early career (2012–2013) ====
Arndt had no prior wrestling experience before WWE signed him. He had trained with Joe DeFranco at the DeFranco's Training Systems gym in Wyckoff, New Jersey since the age of 16. By chance, WWE executive Triple H also started training with DeFranco; Arndt, a lifelong fan of professional wrestling, made a compilation video of himself doing various exercises and cutting a promo. When DeFranco showed the video to Triple H, Arndt was given a tryout at WWE, ultimately resulting in his signing. Ardnt has claimed that Triple H had found the video online but this has been disputed. In August 2012, WWE signed Arndt, who then started using the ring name Eric Anthony. In November 2012, he was given the ring name of Enzo Amore when he debuted in WWE's developmental system NXT as a wrestler.

==== Teaming with Big Cass (2013–2017) ====
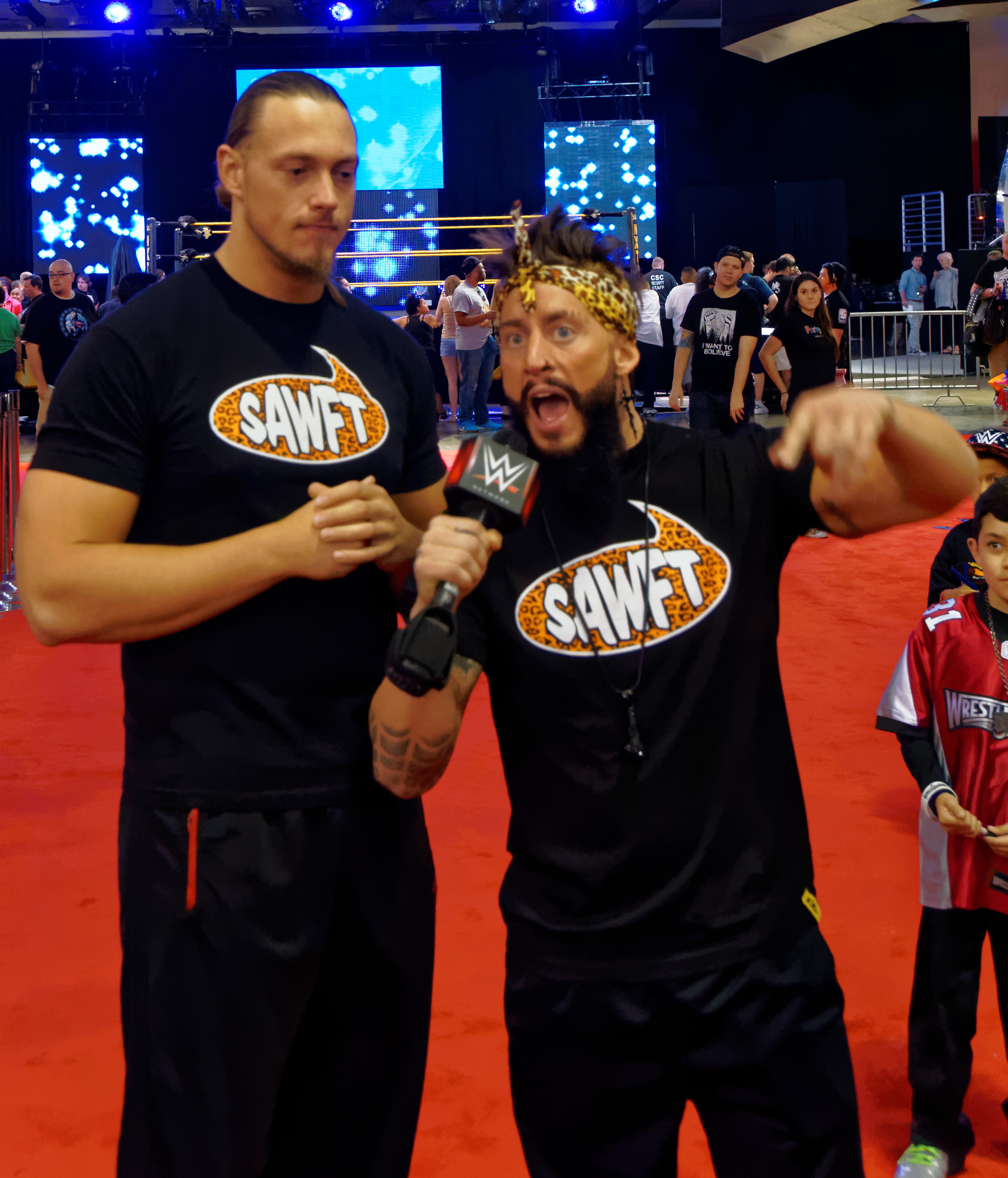
Amore (right) with Colin Cassady at WrestleMania Axxess in March 2015

On May 22, 2013, Amore debuted on NXT television as a heel, portraying an Italian American who is described as a "stereotypical cocky, Jersey Shore loudmouth" and an "outsized version of the man playing the part", where he was squashed by Mason Ryan. On the July 3 episode of NXT, Amore went on to form an alliance with Colin Cassady, who had also lost to Ryan, and they named themselves "the realest guys in the room". Despite Amore and Cassady's alliance, Ryan easily defeated them in consecutive singles matches in July, but lost to them in a handicap match. After the feud with Ryan, Amore and Cassady went on to feud with Alexander Rusev, Scott Dawson and their manager Sylvester Lefort, turning face in the process. On the September 25 episode of NXT, Amore and Cassady participated in a gauntlet match for a future shot at the NXT Tag Team Championship; they started the match, first defeating CJ Parker and Tyler Breeze, then defeating Rusev and Dawson but lost to The Ascension (Konnor and Viktor). In November 2013, Amore suffered a broken leg while training. According to fellow wrestler Simon Gotch, who at the time was also signed to NXT, Amore was training with Kalisto and "broke his own leg trying to counter a wristlock. He blamed it on the canvas being loose."

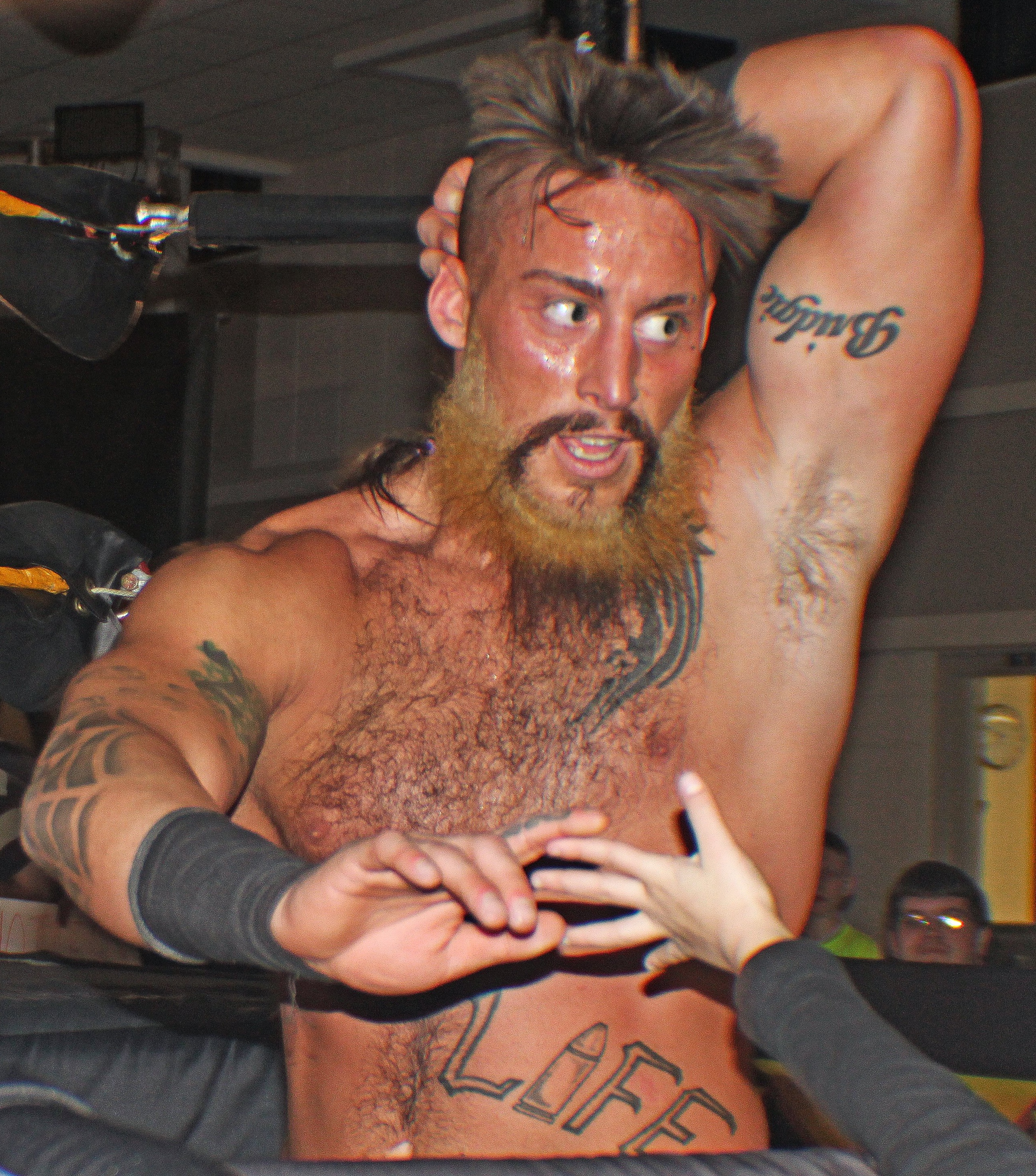
Amore at a live event in 2015

Amore returned on June 26, 2014 episode of NXT, saving Cassady from an attack from Sylvester Lefort and Marcus Louis. In early August, Amore and Cassady participated in the NXT Tag Team Championship tournament. They defeated Jason Jordan and Tye Dillinger in the first round, but were eliminated by The Vaudevillains (Aiden English and Simon Gotch) in the second round. Lefort and Louis then renewed their rivalry with Amore and Cassady by attacking them and shaving Amore's beard. As a result, Amore challenged Lefort to a match with the loser's hair as forfeit at NXT TakeOver: Fatal 4-Way which Amore won, but Lefort ran away, leaving his partner Louis to lose his hair and eyebrows. Amore and Cassady then formed an alliance with the debuting Carmella. The duo had accidentally cost Carmella her hairdressing job, causing her to demand to get a job as a wrestler. Carmella had her televised in-ring debut on the October 16, 2014, episode of NXT. On the March 11, 2015, episode of NXT, Amore and Cassady defeated The Lucha Dragons to become the number one contenders for the NXT Tag Team Championship. At NXT TakeOver: Unstoppable, Amore and Cassady faced Blake and Murphy for the title in a losing effort after interference from Alexa Bliss. In December, Amore and Cassady began a feud with Dash and Dawson, where they challenged them for the NXT Tag Team Championship at both NXT TakeOver: London and Roadblock unsuccessfully.

On the Raw after WrestleMania 32, Amore and Cassady debuted on the main roster and confronted The Dudley Boyz. A week later on SmackDown, Amore and Cassady defeated The Ascension in a tournament to determine the number one contenders for the WWE Tag Team Championship. The team went on to defeat The Dudley Boyz on the following week's Raw in the semi-final of the tag team tournament, advancing them to the finals. In the finals, they faced the Vaudevillains at Payback, with the match ending in a no contest after Amore suffered a legitimate concussion during the match. At Money in the Bank, Enzo and Cass faced The New Day, The Vaudevillains and Luke Gallows and Karl Anderson, in a fatal-four-way tag team match for the WWE Tag Team Championship, in which The New Day retained their titles. On the July 4 episode of Raw, Enzo and Cass helped John Cena, who was getting attacked by The Club (AJ Styles, Luke Gallows and Karl Anderson) involving themselves in the feud between Cena and The Club. At Battleground, Enzo and Cass teamed with Cena to defeat The Club in a six-man tag team match.

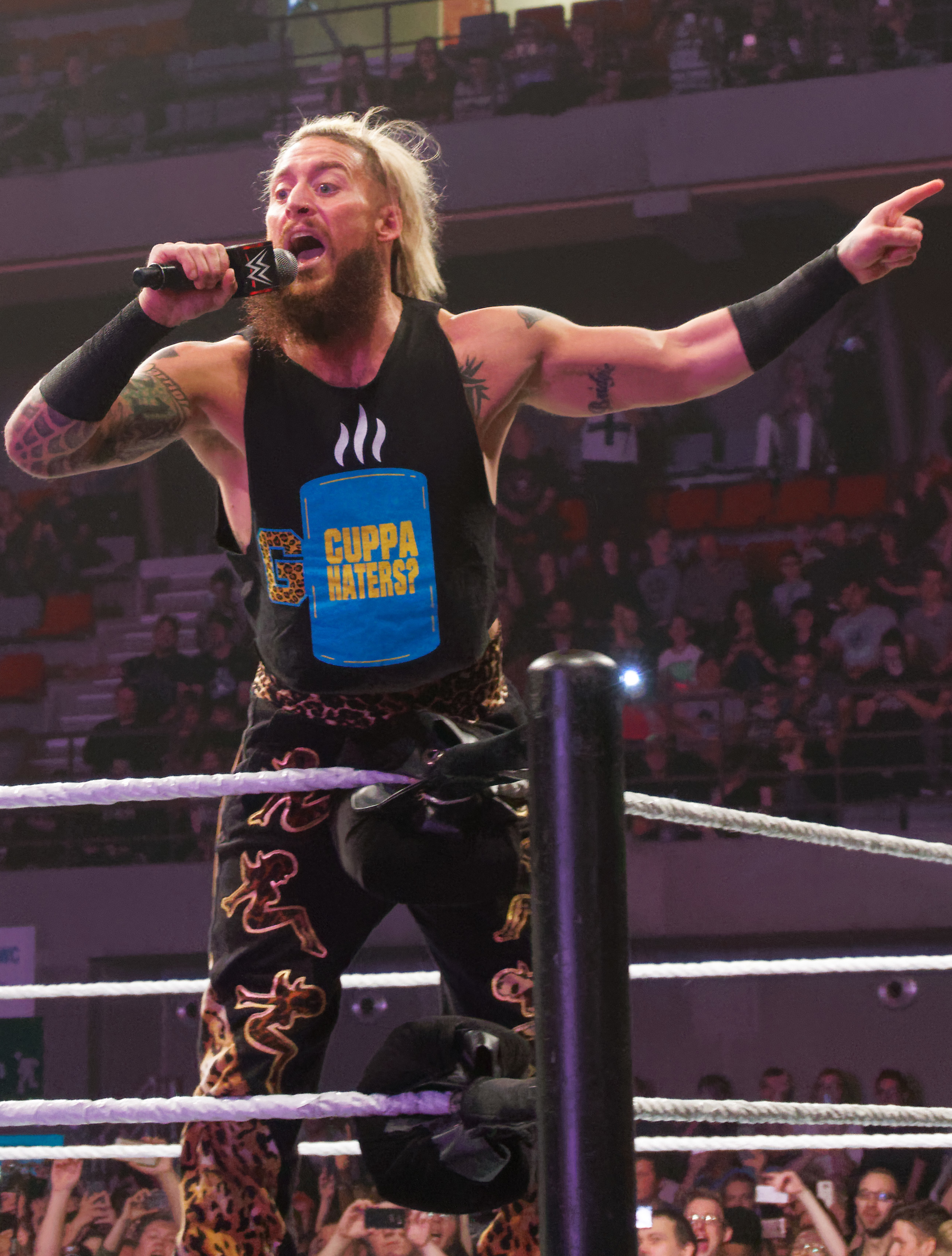
Amore in 2017

On July 19 at the 2016 WWE draft, Enzo and Cass were drafted to the Raw brand. Enzo and Cass then proceeded to feud with Chris Jericho and Kevin Owens, which culminated at SummerSlam, where the two lost to Jericho and Owens. On the November 7 episode of Raw, Enzo and Cass joined Team Raw for the Survivor Series Tag Team Elimination match at Survivor Series, during which Team Raw defeated Team SmackDown. On the November 21 episode of Raw, after Amore was locked out of the locker room naked by Cass as a practical joke and ran into Lana in the hallway, her husband Rusev challenged Amore to a match later that night, in which Amore was quickly defeated. On the December 5 episode of Raw, after Amore stood up for Lana after seeing her and Rusev argue backstage, Lana invited Amore to her hotel room. Later that night, this was revealed to be a trap when Rusev attacked Amore in the hotel room. Over the following weeks, Enzo and Cass feuded with Rusev and Jinder Mahal. On January 29, 2017, Amore participated in the Royal Rumble match, entering at number 27 but was eliminated by Brock Lesnar. At WrestleMania 33, Enzo and Cass competed in a fatal-four-way ladder match for the Raw Tag Team Championship against defending champions Luke Gallows and Karl Anderson, Cesaro and Sheamus, and the returning The Hardy Boyz, where The Hardy Boyz emerged victorious. The following night on Raw, Amore and Cass were defeated by Cesaro and Sheamus in a tag team match to determinate the number one contenders for the Raw Tag Team Championship.

On the May 22 episode of Raw, Amore was found unconscious backstage after being attacked from behind by an unknown assailant, and again the following week. Big Cass went on to accuse The Revival, who had been seen in the background in the aftermath of the attacks. On the June 5 episode of Raw, Cass was found knocked out backstage in the same fashion as Amore was. Later, Cass claimed he was not cleared to wrestle, so Amore teamed with Big Show in a match against Luke Gallows and Karl Anderson, which they won. The following week, Cass was again found knocked out backstage. He claimed the attacker had to have had a giant fist and blamed Big Show, who denied having been the attacker. On the June 19 episode of Raw, General Manager Kurt Angle attempted to expose the attacker before security footage found by Corey Graves revealed that Cass had faked his own attack in order to lure away suspicion. Cass admitted to this, expressing his frustration during his time teaming with Amore. Cass then attacked Amore, thus disbanding the team. On the June 26 episode of Raw, Amore called out Cass to the ring and the two seemingly reconciled; however, Cass again viciously attacked Amore on the stage. At the Great Balls of Fire pay-per-view, Amore was defeated by Cass. At SummerSlam, Cass defeated Big Show while Amore was suspended above the ring inside a shark cage. During the match, Amore escaped from the shark cage, but was quickly attacked by Cass. The next night, on the August 21 episode of Raw, Amore challenged Cass to a Street Fight, which he won after the referee stopped the match after Cass suffered a legitimate knee injury.

==== Cruiserweight Champion (2017–2018) ====
On the August 22 episode of 205 Live, Amore debuted in the cruiserweight division and began a feud with Cruiserweight Champion Neville. On the September 5 episode of 205 Live, Amore earned a title opportunity against Neville, winning a Fatal five-way elimination match also involving Cedric Alexander, The Brian Kendrick, Gran Metalik and Tony Nese. At No Mercy on September 24, Amore defeated Neville with a low blow to win the Cruiserweight Championship. This decision was made because of 205 Live's lack of success; Vince McMahon thought a "strong" character as Amore would improve the brand, making him the core of the show. The following night on Raw, Amore closed the show with a "championship celebration", where he insulted the cruiserweight division and stated that he made 205 Live "relevant" and that the 205 Live roster was "jealous" of his accomplishments, turning heel for the first time since 2013. He also showed a signed clause by General Manager Kurt Angle that if any cruiserweight touched him, they would lose their title opportunities. The week after on Raw, Amore revealed another paper clause stating that any cruiserweight that tried to touch him would be fired. Subsequently, Kalisto was introduced as the newest member of the cruiserweight division and attacked Amore. On the October 9 episode of Raw, Amore lost the Cruiserweight Championship to Kalisto in a lumberjack match. However, he regained the title in the rematch at TLC: Tables, Ladders & Chairs on October 22, via an illegal thumb shot to the eye behind the referee's back. At the Survivor Series pre-show on November 19, Amore successfully defended the title against Kalisto. This was his last WWE pay-per-view appearance. In early January 2018, Amore was unable to compete due to suffering from influenza.

Amore was suspended from WWE on January 22, 2018, due to his sexual assault allegations (see below). As a result, his scheduled title defense against Cedric Alexander at the Royal Rumble was canceled. The next day, Amore was fired from WWE and the title was vacated. After his release, Amore retired from professional wrestling to focus on his music career.

On November 18, 2018, Arndt attended the Survivor Series event. He stood on his seat, causing a disruption, and was eventually removed from the venue by security as well as banned from future events at the Staples Center.

=== Ring of Honor (2019) ===
Arndt, alongside former tag team partner William Morrissey, appeared at the G1 Supercard at Madison Square Garden. Following a tag team match involving Ring of Honor and New Japan Pro-Wrestling talent, the two jumped the barricade and attacked several wrestlers. The broadcast cameras cut away from the incident to indicate a legit outside attack, but it was later reported the angle was a worked shoot. However, following the angle, the duo were not booked for any following shows and the incident was never mentioned again.

=== Independent circuit (2019–2026) ===
nZo in 2021

On June 15, Arndt, under the ring name nZo, debuted for Northeast Wrestling (NEW), accompanying Morrissey, now known as CaZXL, in his match against Jon Moxley. During the match, nZo attempted to interfere, but was attacked by Moxley as a result. Caz would go on to lose the match. At NEW's "Prison Break" on August 16, nZo wrestled his first match since January 2018, defeating Brian Pillman Jr.

Real1 participated in Chris Jericho's Rock 'N' Wrestling Rager at Sea cruise championship tournament from January 31 to February 4, 2025, performing a notable entrance and reuniting onstage with his former WWE tag team partner Big Cass for fan engagement activities.

=== New Japan Pro-Wrestling (2023) ===
Amore was set to make his New Japan Pro-Wrestling (NJPW) debut in a six-man tag team match in 2019, but the match never materialized. Four years later, Amore made his debut on August 19, 2023, in a six-man tag team match, teaming up with Jack Cartwheel and Starboy Charlie in a losing effort against Rich Swann, Ryusuke Taguchi, and The DKC.

=== Major League Wrestling (2021–2023) ===
On November 6, 2021, at War Chamber, nZo made his MLW debut, defeating Matt Cross. He subsequently changed his ring name to Real1 and worked as a heel in feuds against the likes of Jacob Fatu, KC Navarro and Mance Warner. On April 1, 2023, it was reported that MLW would no longer be working with Arndt, who had been working on a per-appearance agreement. Fightful reported that Arndt was refusing most angles pitched to him, including a scheduled match against Alexander Hammerstone for the MLW World Heavyweight Championship at Battle Riot V on April 8, 2023. Arndt claimed the match against Hammerstone was advertised without him agreeing to the match. He also claimed he turned down a program with Richard Holliday after the company wanted him to "bury a guy who just beat cancer". nZo had been written off TV at Blood and Thunder after losing to Microman in a quick squash.

=== Total Nonstop Action Wrestling (2025) ===
On July 20, 2025 at the pre-show edition of Slammiversary, Real1 made his Total Nonstop Action Wrestling (TNA) debut, teaming with Zilla Fatu and Josh Bishop to defeat Steve Maclin, Jake Something, and Mance Warner.

== Music career ==
Under the stage name Real1, Arndt began pursuing a career as a rapper in May 2018, releasing his first song titled "Phoenix" through WorldStarHipHop on May 28, 2018. He released a second song titled "Bury Me a G" on June 7. On November 18, using the name nZo, Arndt released an album titled Rosemary's Baby Pt. 1: Happy Birthday. Arndt's second album, Born in N.J. was released on August 15, 2019. On March 31, 2020, Arndt released Certified G Series: Zo's Exotic Quarantine Music, the first mixtape under the Real1 Entertainment label.

== Other media ==
Arndt is a playable character in WWE 2K16, WWE 2K17, and WWE 2K18 as Enzo Amore. In 2019 Arndt appeared in the music video for the song "Everything's Wrong" by the metalcore band All That Remains.

Arndt starred as nZo in the 2022 animated series The Gimmicks, an adult comedy about "washed-up professional wrestlers trying to get back into the spotlight" which fans could influence by buying NFTs. He made his live-action film debut in the 2024 crime thriller Jersey Bred as Dirty Jerzee. In 2025, Arndt was one of three former WWE wrestlers to cameo in Tom MacDonald's music video "Can't Cancel All Of Us," along with Lacey Evans and Scotty 2 Hotty.

== Personal life ==
Before his employment with WWE, Arndt met William Morrissey, while playing basketball together at the Cage of Manhattan, New York, nearly ten years before reuniting on NXT in July 2013. Arndt's friendship with Morrissey became rocky in August 2017 after Arndt publicly criticized Morrissey for not finishing their August 21 match after injuring his knee. The two have since reconciled.

Arndt was in a relationship with fellow professional wrestler and New Jersey native Gionna Daddio, who currently performs in WWE as Liv Morgan. Their relationship ended when Daddio accused Arndt of cheating on her.

=== Sexual assault allegation ===
On January 22, 2018, the Phoenix Police Department confirmed that Arndt was under investigation for an alleged sexual assault that was reported to authorities in October 2017. Later that day, Arndt was suspended by WWE due to violating their zero tolerance policy for matters involving sexual harassment and sexual assault. WWE released a statement indicating that he would remain suspended until the matter was resolved. In an interview on January 23, Philomena Sheahan accused him of raping her in a Phoenix, Arizona, hotel room on October 19, 2017. Arndt was fired from WWE the same day, due to his failure to inform WWE of the investigation. Arndt responded, via his lawyer, that he was not even aware of the investigation until it was made public. On Twitter, Arndt "fully and unequivocally" denied the allegations against him. Soon afterward, a friend of Sheahan came forward publicly to admit that allegations had been falsified, presenting a text conversation as evidence. On May 16, 2018, the Phoenix Police Department ceased their investigation due to insufficient evidence.

== Championships and accomplishments ==
- 4th Rope Wrestling
  - 4th Rope Flyweight Championship (1 time, inaugural, current)
- Awesome Championship Wrestling
  - ACW National Championship (1 time)
- Pro Wrestling Illustrated
  - Ranked No. 110 of the top 500 singles wrestlers in the PWI 500 in 2017
- Rolling Stone
  - Ranked No. 10 of the 10 best WWE wrestlers of 2016 with Big Cass
- WWE
  - WWE Cruiserweight Championship (2 times)
  - NXT Year-End Award for Tag Team of the Year (2015) – with Colin Cassady

== Luchas de Apuestas record ==
| Winner (wager) | Loser (wager) | Location | Event | Date | Notes |
|---|---|---|---|---|---|
| Enzo Amore (hair) | Sylvester Lefort (hair) | Orlando, Florida | NXT TakeOver: Fatal 4-Way | September 11, 2014 | (Note: Lefort's tag team partner Marcus Louis lost his hair after Lefort ran away.) |
