= Grado (wrestler) =

Scottish professional wrestler and actor

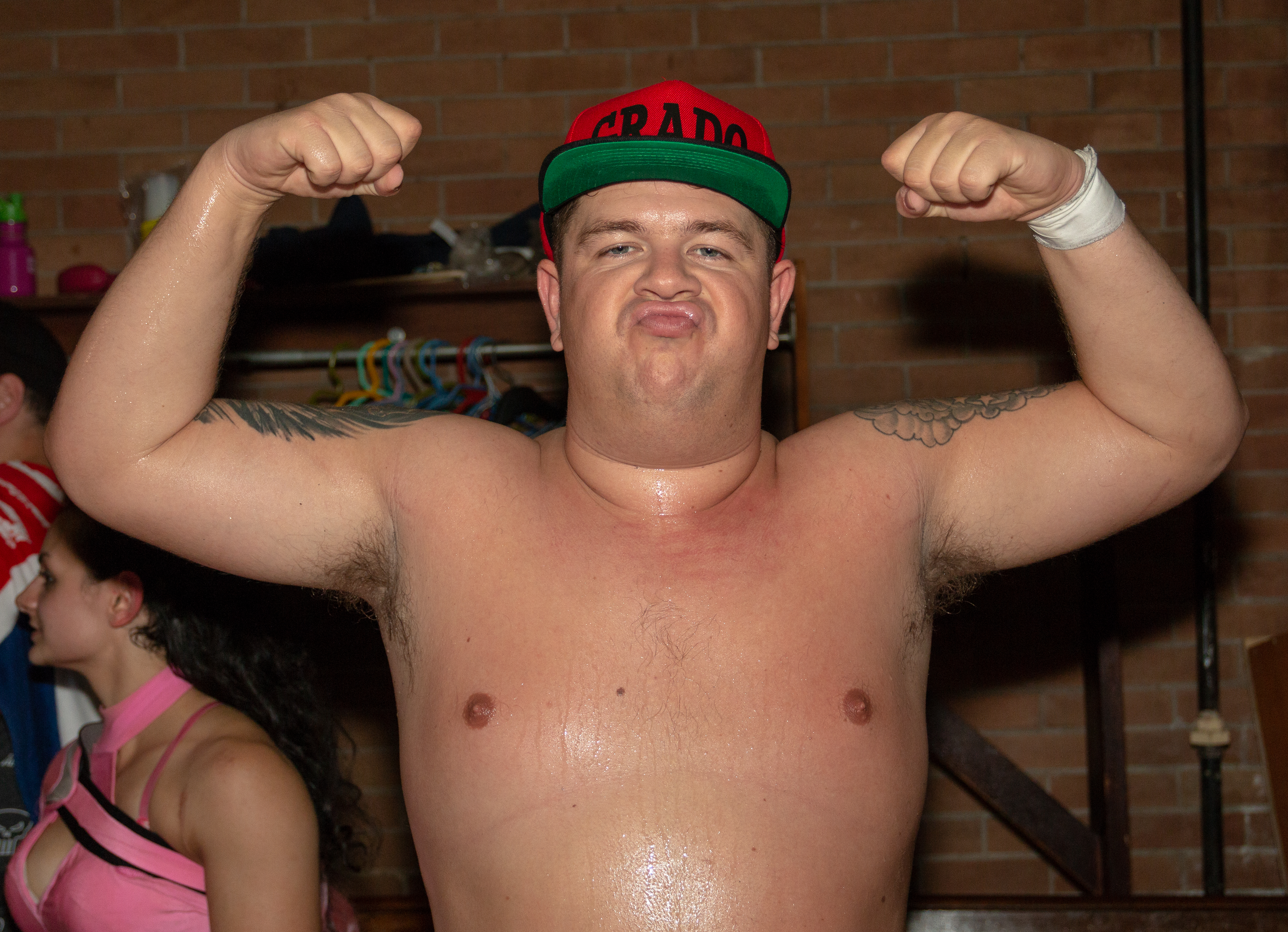
- Grado in 2018

Personal information
- Born: Graeme Stevely; 2 June 1988 (age 38) Stevenston, Ayrshire, Scotland

Professional wrestling career
- Ring name(s): Grado; Grant Dunbar; Matt Classic; Odarg the Great
- Billed height: 5 ft 11 in (1.80 m)
- Billed weight: 235 lb (107 kg)
- Billed from: "The tap end of Stevenston" Parts Unknown
- Trained by: Conscience; Killian Dain; Drew McIntyre; Andrew Wason; Adam Shame
- Debut: 2004

Graeme Stevely, known by the ring name Grado (/ˈɡreɪdoʊ/ GRAY-doh), is a Scottish professional wrestler and actor. He is currently signed to Insane Championship Wrestling (ICW), where he is a former ICW World Heavyweight Champion. As an actor, he is best known for playing Alan in Two Doors Down and PC Hugh McKirdy in Scot Squad. In August 2025, Grado began presenting the Heart Scotland Breakfast show.

== Professional wrestling career ==
=== Early career (2002–2006) ===
Grado first got into wrestling in 2002. He trained briefly with Red Lightning, Kid Fite, and Drew Galloway at British Championship Wrestling. A few years later he went on to train with the Scottish Wrestling Alliance. He made his debut for them in 2004, under the ring name Grant Dunbar, as part of The Lowlanders with Glen Dunbar. They achieved little success, but held the SWA Tag Team Championships on two occasions.

=== Insane Championship Wrestling (2012–2017) ===
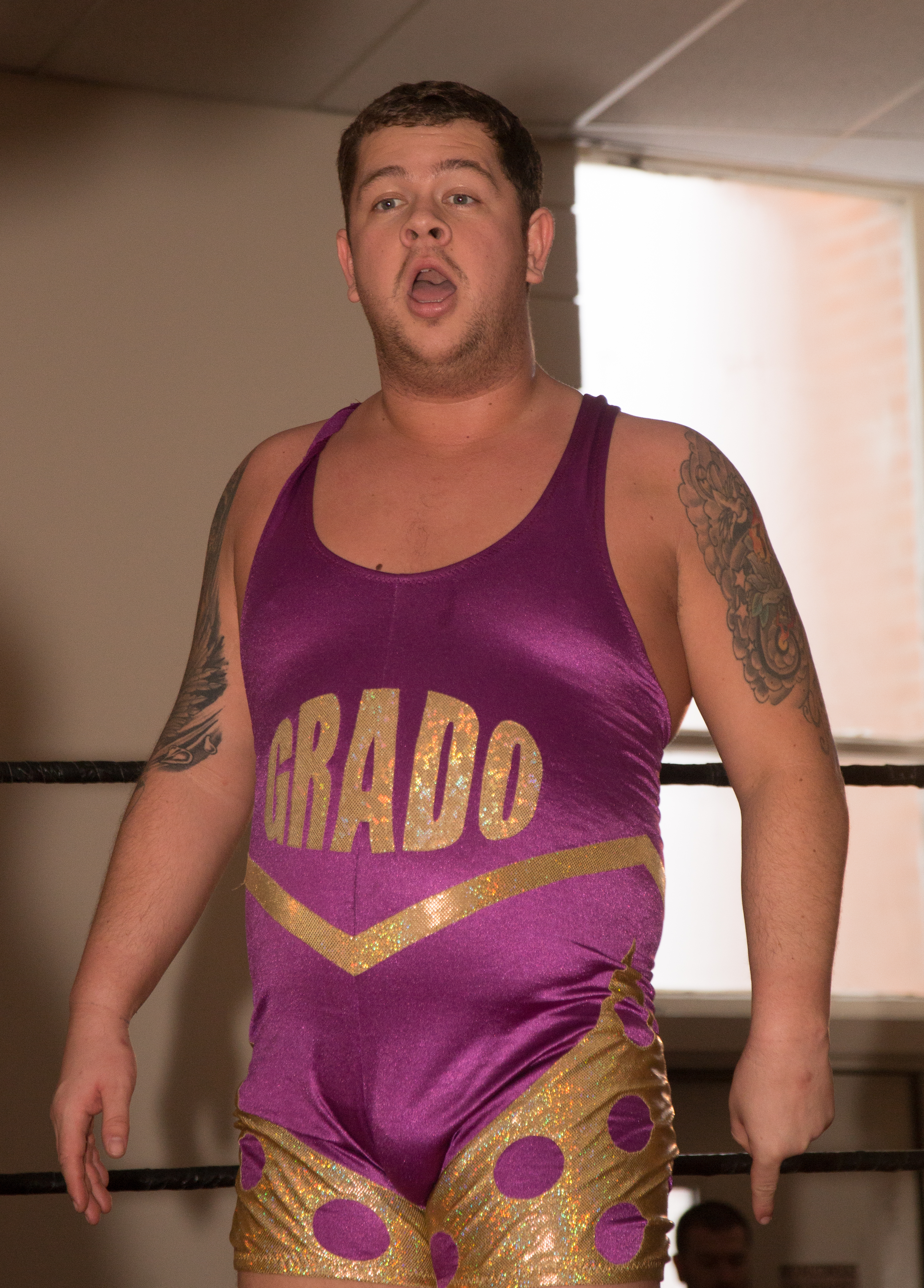
Grado at Alpha-1 Wrestling's Watch the Throne 3, 2015

After years of wrestling sporadically and performing as lead singer of Scottish metalcore band Prezident Prime, Grado returned to training at SWA, this time with new head trainer Big Damo. He made a Facebook video to sell tickets for a Scottish Wrestling Alliance show next to his home town, leading to a promo feud with Jackie Polo which included his first time dancing along to Madonna "Like a Prayer". These videos and promos became popular and Mark Dallas from Insane Championship Wrestling (ICW) hatched the "Get Grado Booked" campaign. During this time, Grado was the subject of a Vice documentary, The British Wrestler, which saw his popularity rise with American stars like Sonjay Dutt voicing their support. As part of the Vice documentary, Grado appeared to defeat ICW Heavyweight Champion Red Lightning at Super Smokin' Thunderbowl to win the ICW Heavyweight Championship. The match was later restarted as Red Lightning had his leg under the bottom rope. Red Lightning would go on to retain the title.

During the ICW Fringe Tour in 2014, Grado teamed up with Colt Cabana to face the New Age Kliq (Chris Renfrew and BT Gunn) and won the first Official ICW Tag Team Championships. Grado and Cabana are known as Irn Jew and on the last night of the tour they lost their Tag Team Championships to The New Age Kliq. On 15 November 2015 Fear & Loathing VIII Grado defeated Drew Galloway to win the ICW World Heavyweight Championship at the SECC.

At the fifth annual Square Go on 24 January 2016, Grado lost the ICW World Heavyweight Championship to Chris Renfrew, ending his reign at just two months, the shortest reign in ICW history at that time. At the event he also debuted a new theme, and a new look, coming out to a rock version of "99 Problems" replacing his long time theme "Like A Prayer", as well as ditching his long time singlet for trunks, and the flannel given to him by Mick Foley at Fear and Loathing VIII.

At Fear & Loathing IX on 20 November 2016, in the SSE Hydro, Grado teamed as a part of Team Dallas to defeat Team Black Label to reclaim ownership of ICW.

On 16 April 2017 At Barramania III Grado turned heel for the first time in his career by attacking his longtime friend Sha Samuels and aligning himself with Red Lightning. At Shug's Hoose Party 4 on 30 July he lost to Samuels in a Loser Leaves ICW match forcing Grado to leave ICW.

=== Premier British Wrestling (2012–2016) ===
On 3 November 2012 Grado partnered with JD Bravo in a tag team match against The Coffey Brothers (Joe Coffey and Mark Coffey) with The Coffey Brothers winning the Match. On 14 March 2015 Grado teamed with Kenny Williams against Darkside and TJ Rage for the Premier British Wrestling Tag Team Championship. Grado and Williams won the match to become new tag champions.

=== Pro Wrestling Elite (2013–2018) ===
Grado won the PWE Elite Rumble to for earn a title shot and the opportunity to name the next event. The next PWE show was called Gradomania. He won the Pro Wrestling Elite Heavyweight Championship from Dave Mastiff at GradoMania. Grado held the title for 511 days, retaining against Andy Wild, Noam Dar, Liam Thomson and Joey Hayes. He lost the title to Iestyn Rees after Rees cashed in his title shot at PWE Jingle All The Galloway.

In the last ever PWE show, following the passing of Adrian 'Lionheart' McCallum, Grado was to recapture the title and following a conversation with a fan presented the title to Adrian's mother.

=== Independent circuit (2006–present) ===
In addition to working in Insane Championship Wrestling, Grado also appears for various companies around the UK. He has worked for SWA, PWE, SWE, PBW and Wrestlezone among other companies. At WrestleZone's Aberdeen Anarchy event at the Beach Ballroom in May 2014 in front of a sold out 1,200 crowd, Grado defeated childhood hero Scotty 2 Hotty. Grado worked for What Culture Pro Wrestling and U.S. Promotions for Various Companies he has Worked for F1RST Wrestling, Absolute Intense Wrestling.

=== Total Nonstop Action Wrestling / Impact Wrestling ===
==== Various storylines (2014–2016) ====
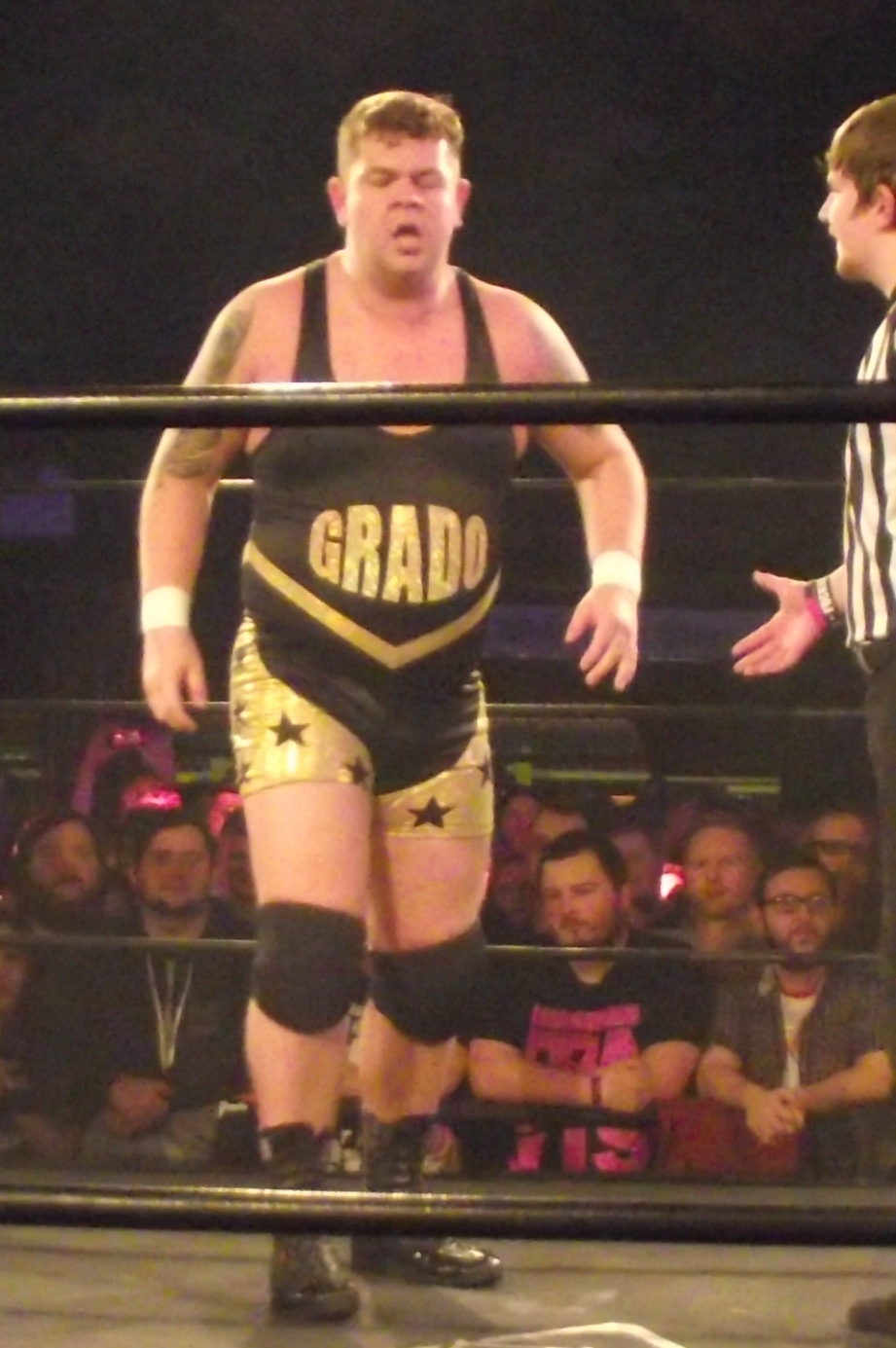
Grado in 2014

In 2014, Grado appeared on the second season of TNA British Boot Camp in an ongoing feud with judge Al Snow. After missing the second round of the competition due to having lunch and losing track of time, Snow threw Grado out of the competition. Grado would then appear at the Manchester auditions and was once again thrown out. He reappeared in London and with some convincing from Gail Kim, Snow allowed him back into the competition. Snow would then send Sha Samuels to rough up Grado in the second round. He would make it through to the British finals and onto the U.S. finals before finally being eliminated at the Top 6. After Snow eliminated Grado from the competition, Grado challenged Snow to a match at the SSE Hydro as part of TNA's Maximum Impact Tour in January 2015. Snow accepted and Grado went on to win the match, followed by Snow shaking his hand.

Grado appeared at Destination X on 10 June, having earned another chance in TNA following his victory over Snow. Grado later appeared in several backstage segments, attempting parkour and trying to lose weight to be able to compete in the X Division. Only at the weigh-in did Jeremy Borash inform Grado that "there are no limits in the X-Division". Grado would immediately compete against Kenny King and Cruz, getting the pinfall victory over the latter. Grado fought for the TNA X Division Championship in a losing effort against Low Ki and Tigre Uno. Uno won the match and the title. During October and November (taped in July), Grado went on to participate in the new TNA World Title Series tournament, where he was placed fourth of his block in Team UK. He failed to win all the matches against Drew Galloway, Rockstar Spud, and Bram, thus failing to advance to the round of 16 from his block. On the 26 January 2016 edition of Impact Wrestling. Grado competed in the Feast or Fired match and was the first man to grab the briefcase. Unfortunately, later in the broadcast, during the reveal ceremony, the briefcase revealed that Grado contained the pink slip and as a result of that, he was immediately fired from TNA.

On 9 February 2016, Grado returned to Impact Wrestling claiming he was screwed and was going to show proof that he was screwed when Eli Drake arrived with security. His security then chased Grado out the ring, and Drake attempted to attack him only to be assaulted by Grado. Grado escaped through a tunnel. Later in the night, Billy Corgan was talking about the new UK tour when Grado complained about being screwed. After repeatedly making a rant, security escorted him away. Drake then interrupted Grado and told him "he better shut up about whatever he thinks he knows" and then attacked him.

==== Teaming with Shera (2016–2017) ====
During TNA's Maximum Impact tour of the UK, Grado would make an appearance as a masked wrestler under the guise of Odarg the Great, tagging with Mahabali Shera against Eli Drake and Jessie Godderz. He was billed from "Parts Unknown" and used Grado's move set and entrance theme. At Lockdown, he defeated Eli Drake in a Six Sides of Steel match. Grado would continue appearing during the Maximum Impact 8 tour claiming to have proof that he was "screwed" by Eli Drake. A week later, while showing viewers at home a proof for Grado's point of showing Drake peeking into Grado's briefcase, though it could not be seen if Drake indeed switched cases with Grado, the fact Drake opened Grado's case was enough for Grado to receive a contract ladder match against Drake, which he went on to win. Two weeks later, when he started talking to Mahabali Shera about his comeback party, both men were, with no clear reason, brutally attacked by Al Snow. More than a month after, on the 10 May 2016 episode of Impact Wrestling, Grado returned during a rematch between Snow and Shera, making sure Shera won the match. On the 24 May episode of Impact Wrestling, Grado had a street fight with Snow with Shera at ringside, which he went on to lose after interference by two unknown men. At Slammiversary, Grado and Shera were defeated by the two men, who are Basile Baraka and Baron Dax, also known as The Tribunal. On 14 June edition of Impact Wrestling, Grado and Mahabali have a four-way tag team match for the TNA World Tag Team Championship against The Tribunal, The BroMans and Decay, in a losing effort. On 28 June edition of Impact Wrestling, Grado, Mahabali Shera and Tyrus defeated Al Snow and The Tribunal. On 4 August edition of Impact Wrestling, Grado and Mahabali Shera defeated Al Snow and The Tribunal in a handicap match. At Bound for Glory, he participated in the Bound for Gold but was quickly eliminated by Rockstar Spud. On the 24 November episode of Impact Wrestling, Grado lost to Robbie E in a Turkey Bowl match where he was forced to wear a turkey suit.

==== American deportation storyline (2017–2018) ====
Grado made his return to Global Force Wrestling on the 13 July 2017 edition of Impact, where he asked Joseph Park for help because if he does not marry a United States citizen in order to avoid deportation, he would be deported from the United States, so he asked Laurel Van Ness on a date, which was interrupted by Kongo Kong but she answered yes to Grado during a backstage interview and Grado dated Laurel Van Ness the following week.

On 27 July, Grado proposed to Laurel Van Ness before Kongo Kong came out and scared Grado and Joseph Park away. On the 3 August edition of Impact, Grado would team with Braxton Sutter and Suicide as they defeated Fallah Bahh, KM and Mario Bokara, after the match Grado tried to propose again by was attacked by Kongo Kong. The following week, Grado and Joseph Park would face Kongo Kong in a handicap match where they were defeated; after the match Grado was saved by Tyrus.

The following week on Impact Wrestling, Grado announced that he was going to be deported, and he would say his goodbyes on the following week. On the 24 August episode of Impact Wrestling, while Grado said farewell to America on his last night in America, Van Ness came out and proposed to Grado. On the 31 August episode of Impact Wrestling, Van Ness revealed that she is a Canadian, while Grado needed to marry an American; as a result, Grado refused to marry Van Ness because she was Canadian, leaving Van Ness in the process of becoming a maniacal villainess once again. Grado was subsequently granted a work visa by Joseph Park when he signed a sports entertainment contract with Park's law firm. Park began using Grado as a "meal ticket" to live a lavish lifestyle and paying Grado very little.

When Grado confronted Park about being underpaid, Park challenged Grado to a match at Bound for Glory for control of Grado's visa. Grado did not read the contract which stipulated a Monster Ball's match against Park's brother Abyss. Grado was defeated by Abyss at Bound for Glory after Grado was attacked by the villainous Van Ness during the match. However, two weeks later on the 16 November edition of Impact, Park apologized to Grado and gave him his visa papers. A mountie then took him away as his visa papers were only valid in the United States, but they did not let him legally work in Canada, where Impact Wrestling's main office was located at the time.

=== Return and WOS Wrestling reboot (2018–2019) ===
In May 2018 Grado resumed his association with World of Sport Wrestling in the UK and was part of the TV tapings in Norwich held between 10–12 May 2018. The series was later broadcast in the summer of that year on ITV. In the opening episode, Grado lost the title on his first defense in a match with Rampage Brown.

=== Return to ICW (2018–present) ===
On 29 July 2018, Grado made his return to ICW at Shug's Hoose Party V, when TNA and WWE Hall of Famer Jeff Jarrett announced Grado as Jackie Polo's opponent; Grado went on to win the match.

=== All Elite Wrestling (2023) ===
At All Elite Wrestling’s All In event, Grado made a surprise appearance on the pre-show. He joined forces with Paul Wight and Anthony Ogogo to fend off Jeff Jarrett, Satnam Singh, Jay Lethal, and Sonjay Dutt.

=== Return to Impact Wrestling (2023) ===
Grado competed on every night of Impact Wrestling's 2023 UK Invasion Tour, performing in Glasgow, Newcastle, and two nights in Coventry. However, his appearances were a one-time event to celebrate the company’s first UK tour since 2016, and he did not return to Impact Wrestling afterward.

=== Pro Wrestling Noah (2024) ===
Grado appeared at Pro Wrestling Noah's show in Edinburgh on 6 September 2024. He teamed with Naomichi Marufuji to defeat HAYATA and Tate Mayfairs.

== Acting and television/radio presenting career ==
Grado portrayed Police Constable Hugh McKirdy in the BBC Scotland sitcom Scot Squad. He later starred as Brian Doyle / Buster on the BBC Scotland Scottish soap opera River City. He also starred in BBC Two Comedy pilot The Sunny as Haircut.

In 2016 and 2017 he appeared in the pantomimes "Elfie's Magical Adventure" and "The Wizard That Never Woz" at the Pavilion Theatre, Glasgow. Since 2018, he has appeared in Two Doors Down, a Glasgow-based BBC sitcom. He plays Alan, who has moved from East Kilbride with his partner Michelle, played by Joy McAvoy into a house opposite the main characters.

In 2019 Grado also hosted the BBC Scotland game show Test Drive.

He appeared as wrestler Adrian Sloane in the Endeavour episode "Raga" in February 2020.

Grado is a regular contributor on the rebooted GamesMaster on E4 in 2021.

He appeared as one of a pair of comic policemen in Aladdin at the Pavilion Theatre (Glasgow) in 2022–23.

Grado played Degsy in the second series of Crime in 2023.

He has appeared on the STV annual Hogmanay show Bringing in the Bells from 2021 to 2025.

Grado used to present the breakfast show with Crofty on Go Radio until he left in August 2025 to join the Heart Scotland Breakfast Show with Des Clarke and Adele.

== Filmography ==
| Title | Date | Network/channel | Role | Notes |
|---|---|---|---|---|
| The Sunny | 2014 | BBC Scotland | Haircut | Pilot |
| Insane Fight Club | 2014 | BBC | Grado | |
| River City | 2014, 2026 (guest appearance for 1 episode) | BBC Scotland | Brian 'Buster' Doyle | |
| TNA British Boot Camp | 2014 | Challenge | Grado | |
| Scot Squad | 2017 | BBC Scotland | PC Hugh McKirdy | |
| Two Doors Down | 2018–present | BBC Scotland; BBC Two; BBC One | Alan | |
| Test Drive | 2019, 2023 | BBC Scotland | Host/presenter | 2 series |
| Endeavour | 2020 | ITV | Adrian Sloane | |
| GamesMaster | 2021 | Channel 4 | Himself | |
| Bringing in the Bells | 2021–2024 | STV | Himself/host | |
| Scotland's Greatest Escape | 2023 | BBC | Himself/host | with Judith Ralston |

== Personal life ==
Grado was born in Stevenston in 1988. His mother worked part time as a cook at Irvine Central Hospital, and his father was a taxi driver

A Rangers F.C. supporter, Grado appeared as a special guest in The Legends Return match at Ibrox Stadium along with fellow River City actors Jordan Young and Stephen Purdon. Grado married his fiancée Stephanie in June 2023. They held their wedding ceremony at the Lochside House in New Cumnock. The couple have a daughter together, Perrie, who was born in November 2021.

== Championships and accomplishments ==
- DDT Pro-Wrestling
  - Ironman Heavymetalweight Championship (1 time)
- Insane Championship Wrestling
  - ICW World Heavyweight Championship (1 time)
  - ICW Tag Team Championship (1 time) with Colt Cabana
  - ICW Bammy Award for "Insane Moment of the Year" for winning the ICW Championship at Fear & Loathing VIII (2016)
- International Pro Wrestling: United Kingdom
  - IPW:UK All England Championship (1 time)
- Reckless Intent Wrestling
  - Reckless Intent Heavyweight Championship (1 time)
- Scottish Wrestling Alliance
  - SWA Tag Team Championship (2 time) – with Glen Dunbar
  - SWA Tag Team Title Tournament (2005) – with Glen Dunbar
  - King of Paisley (2019)
- Scottish Wrestling Entertainment
  - SWE World Heavyweight Championship (1 time)
- Swiss Wrestling Entertainment
  - SWE Tag Team Championship (1 time) – with Pascal Spalter
- Target Wrestling
  - Target Wrestling Championship (1 time)
- Total Nonstop Action Wrestling
  - Feast or Fired (2016 – Pink Slip)
- Premier British Wrestling
  - PBW Tag Team Championship (1 time) – with Kenny Williams
- Pro Wrestling Elite
  - PWE World Heavyweight Championship (3 time)
  - Elite Rumble (2014)
- Pro Wrestling Illustrated
  - PWI ranked him 293 of the top 500 singles wrestlers in the PWI 500 in 2016
- World of Sport Wrestling
  - WOS Championship (1 time)
  - WOS Tag Team Championship (1 time) – with British Bulldog Jr.
