= Bound for Glory (2016) =

2016 Total Nonstop Action Wrestling pay-per-view event

- Promotional poster featuring Lashley, Ethan Carter III, Gail Kim, and The Broken Hardys
- Promotion: Total Nonstop Action Wrestling
- Date: October 2, 2016
- City: Orlando, Florida
- Venue: Impact Zone
- Attendance: 1,100

Pay-per-view chronology
← Previous; Slammiversary	Next → Slammiversary XV

Bound for Glory chronology
← Previous; 2015	Next → 2017

The 2016 Bound for Glory was a professional wrestling pay-per-view (PPV) event produced by Total Nonstop Action Wrestling (TNA). It took place on October 2, 2016, at the Impact Zone in Orlando, Florida, the first time since the inaugural 2005 event to be held at the venue. It was the twelfth event in the Bound for Glory chronology, and the last live pay-per-view event under the TNA name until the 2024 Hard To Kill event. It included the induction of Gail Kim into the TNA Hall of Fame, with Christy Hemme, Taryn Terrell and Awesome Kong returning to induct her. The event also featured the official TNA debut of Cody and Brandi Rhodes.

Eight matches, one of which was a match taped for TNA Xplosion, took place at the event. In the main event, Lashley defeated Ethan Carter III to retain the TNA World Heavyweight Championship, and The Hardys (Broken Matt and Brother Nero) defeated Decay (Abyss and Crazzy Steve) in The Great War to become the TNA World Tag Team Champions.

In October 2017, with the launch of the Global Wrestling Network, the event became available to stream on demand.

== Storylines ==
Other on-screen personnel
Commentators	Josh Mathews
Commentators	D'Angelo Dinero
Ring announcers	Jeremy Borash
Ring announcers	Christy Hemme (Knockouts title match)
Referee	Earl Hebner
Referee	Brian Hebner
Referee	Brian Stiffler
Interviewers	Jeremy Borash

Bound for Glory featured professional wrestling matches involving different wrestlers from pre-existing scripted feuds and storylines. Wrestlers portrayed villains, heroes, or less distinguishable characters in the scripted events that built tension and culminate in a wrestling match or series of matches.

On July 8, 2016, TNA is announced that Impact Wrestling would begin airing at 8pm EST on Thursday nights on July 21, the night that would feature the start of the "Bound For Glory Playoff" to determine a new #1 contender to the TNA World Heavyweight Championship. In the first round, Broken Matt, Ethan Carter III, Drew Galloway and Mike Bennett advanced to the semifinals with victories over James Storm, Eli Drake, Bram and Jeff Hardy respectively. Second round action lead to Carter pinning Broken Matt Hardy, and Bennett pinning Galloway. In the final, Carter pinned Bennett to become the number one contender. On the August 4 episode of Impact Wrestling, James Storm defeated Eli Drake to win the TNA King of the Mountain Championship. Lashley would then come out and challenge Storm to a match for his King of the Mountain Championship, whilst putting his TNA World Heavyweight Championship and TNA X Division Championship on the line as well, which Lashley won.

Quarterfinals
James Storm	09:29
Broken Matt	Pin
Ethan Carter III	Pin
Eli Drake	07:55
Drew Galloway	Pin
Bram	06:58
Jeff Hardy	02:10
Mike Bennett	Pin

Semifinals
Broken Matt	07:28
Ethan Carter III	Pin
Drew Galloway	07:48
Mike Bennett	Pin

Final
Ethan Carter III	Pin
Mike Bennett	17:23

The title was introduced at the August 13, 2016 tapings of TNA's television program Impact Wrestling after TNA President Billy Corgan announced that the TNA King of the Mountain Championship would be deactivated and retired in favor for the new Impact Grand Championship. Corgan also announced an eight-man single elimination tournament that would feature new rules that would apply to the title. The new rules would be similar to how bouts were contested in professional wrestling in Europe in which each match will consist of three timed rounds, with a team of judges to award the win based on points, if there is no winner via pin or submission within the time limit. The final match was supposed to be scheduled to be at Bound for Glory to determine the inaugural champion, however, TNA Wrestling announced two days before the PPV that Drew Galloway had an undisclosed injury and will not be able to compete at Bound for Glory. Eddie Edwards was soon announced to be Aron Rex's new opponent for the Impact Grand Championship finals.

Quarterfinals
Braxton Sutter	06:43
Drew Galloway	Sub
Eddie Edwards	Sub
Mahabali Shera	06:53
Aron Rex	Pin
Trevor Lee	04:55
Jessie Godderz	08:14
Eli Drake	Pin

Semifinals
Drew Galloway	Split
Eddie Edwards	09:00
Aron Rex	Pin
Eli Drake	08:41

Final
Eddie Edwards †	15:00
Aron Rex	Split

† Edwards replaced Drew Galloway, who was injured before the finals.

On the August 19 episode of Impact Wrestling, The Hardys won an Ascension to Hell (Ladder match) to become the number one contenders for the TNA World Tag Team Championship against Decay.

On the September 1 episode of Impact Wrestling, Mike Bennett failed to win the TNA World Heavyweight Champion from Lashley in a no-disqualification match after Moose refused to help him. Afterwards, Bennett called Moose "a failed football player" before Moose attacked him, thus ending their partnership and turning face in the process.

On September 15, Gail Kim won a gauntlet match to become the number one contender for the TNA Knockouts Championship, Kim was then scheduled to face Maria for the title.

Gauntlet entrances and eliminations

Draw	Entrant	Order	Eliminated by	Time
1	Jade	2	Marti Bell	7:29
2	Laurel Van Ness	5	Gail Kim	8:39
3	Sienna	6	Gail Kim	9:28
4	Gail Kim	Winner	N/A	8:28
5	Marti Bell	3	Laurel Van Ness	4:19
6	Raquel	4	Sienna	4:20
7	Madison Rayne	1	Laurel Van Ness	1:23

On September 22, TNA announced that the Bound for Gold concept will be making a return for this year's twelfth Bound for Glory event.

On October 2, TNA announced that DJZ will defend his TNA X Division Championship against Trevor Lee at Bound for Glory.

The status of the event was called into question in the days preceding it, with reports indicating that the promotion lacked the funds to go forward and was searching for a new buyer After spending the week leading into the PPV negotiating with President Billy Corgan, as well as WWE, New York Post reported that an unidentified third party had given the company the funds needed to proceed with the event. It was later learned that the third party was Anthem Sports & Entertainment, which proceeded to purchase TNA.

== Results ==
No.	Results	Stipulations	Times
1^{P}	Jade defeated Sienna	Singles match	06:54
2	DJZ (c) defeated Trevor Lee	Singles match for the TNA X Division Championship	11:12
3	Eli Drake won by last eliminating Tyrus	10-Man Bound for Gold Gauntlet match to determine the #1 contender for the TNA World Heavyweight Championship	15:19
4	Moose defeated Mike Bennett	Singles match	10:09
5	Aron Rex defeated Eddie Edwards	Singles match for the inaugural Impact Grand Championship	15:03
6	The Broken Hardys (Brother Nero and Broken Matt) (with Rebecca Hardy) defeated Decay (Abyss and Crazzy Steve) (c) (with Rosemary)	The Great War for the TNA World Tag Team Championship	22:28
7	Gail Kim defeated Maria (c) (with Allie)	Singles match for the TNA Knockouts Championship	05:19
8	Lashley (c) defeated Ethan Carter III	No Holds Barred match for the TNA World Heavyweight Championship	16:11
(c) / – the champion(s) heading into the match; P / – the match was broadcast on the pre-show

=== Bound for Gold Gauntlet entrances and eliminations ===
Draw	Entrant	Order	Eliminated by	Time
1	Jessie Godderz	8	Eli Drake	15:19
2	Rockstar Spud	6	Tyrus	12:07
3	Braxton Sutter	1	Eli Drake	2:06
4	Eli Drake	—	Winner	N/A
5	Robbie E	4	Baron Dax	6:10
6	Baron Dax	5	Jessie Godderz	4:25
7	Grado	2	Rockstar Spud	0:04
8	Basile Baraka	3	Robbie E	1:18
9	Tyrus	9	Eli Drake	4:13
10	Mahabali Shera	7	Eli Drake	1:01

== See also ==
- Bound for Glory Series
- 2016 in professional wrestling
