= Slammiversary (2016) =

TNA professional wrestling event

- Promotional poster featuring various TNA wrestlers
- Promotion: Total Nonstop Action Wrestling
- Date: June 12, 2016
- City: Orlando, Florida
- Venue: Impact Zone
- Tagline: "The Live Global Sizzling Summer Spectacular"

Pay-per-view chronology
← Previous; Bound for Glory	Next → Bound for Glory

Slammiversary chronology
← Previous; 2015	Next → XV

The 2016 Slammiversary was a professional wrestling pay-per-view (PPV) event produced by Total Nonstop Action Wrestling (TNA). It took place on June 12 at the Impact Zone in Orlando, Florida. It was the twelfth event under the Slammiversary chronology and the first event in the 2016 TNA PPV schedule. It was the final Slammiversary event to be branded under the Total Nonstop Action Wrestling name — until 2024 — before it was changed to Impact Wrestling the following year.

Nine professional wrestling matches were featured on the card. The main event consisted of Lashley defeating Drew Galloway by tapout to win the TNA World Heavyweight Championship while the other saw Ethan Carter III defeat Mike Bennett. And, Jeff Hardy defeating Broken Matt in a Full Metal Mayhem match.

In October 2017, with the launch of the Global Wrestling Network, the event became available to stream on demand.

== Storylines ==
Other on-screen personnel
Commentator	Josh Mathews
Commentator	D'Angelo Dinero
Ring announcer	Jeremy Borash
Referee	Earl Hebner
Referee	Brian Hebner
Referee	Brian Stiffler
Interviewers	Jeremy Borash

Slammiversary 2016 featured professional wrestling matches that involved different wrestlers from pre-existing scripted feuds and storylines. Wrestlers portrayed villains, heroes, or less distinguishable characters in the scripted events that built tension and culminated in a wrestling match or series of matches.

On March 8 episode of Impact Wrestling, Lashley defeated Kurt Angle, after the match, he would continue to assault Angle until he was run off by Drew Galloway, Eddie Edwards and Ethan Carter III, thus turning heel once again. On March 15, Galloway cashed in his Feast or Fired briefcase and defeated Matt Hardy to capture the TNA World Heavyweight Championship. He made his first defense of the title on the March 29, defeating Jeff Hardy to retain the title. Galloway defeated Matt Hardy in a rematch for the TNA World Heavyweight Championship, while Lashley feuded with D'Angelo Dinero in a winning effort. On the April 5 episode of Impact Wrestling, Lashley ended the show with two spears on Galloway. On May 3, Lashley defeated Jeff Hardy and Mike Bennett to become the new #1 contender for the TNA World Heavyweight Championship; after the match, Lashley and Galloway brawled around the ring. On the May 17 episode of Impact Wrestling, Galloway fought Lashley for the TNA World Heavyweight Championship in a Lumberjack match which ended in a no contest. On the May 24 episode of Impact Wrestling, after the previous week's chaotic main event ending, Dixie Carter announced that Galloway would face Lashley at Slammiversary for the title, where the only way to win would be by knockout or tapout. On the May 31 episode of Impact Wrestling, both Lashley and Galloway had to pick opponents for their opponents; Galloway picked Bram for Lashley, where the match ended in disqualification, and Lashley picked Decay (Abyss and Crazzy Steve) for Galloway, in which Galloway was victorious. On the June 7 episode of Impact Wrestling, Matt Hardy challenged Galloway for the title, but the match ended in disqualification when Lashley attacked Galloway.

On the January 26 episode of Impact Wrestling, Jeff Hardy issued a challenge to his brother Matt Hardy for the TNA World Heavyweight Championship, but as the match was set to begin, he was attacked by Eric Young and Bram, Hardy was later piledrivered through a table by Young and sent to a hospital. Jeff Hardy made his return on March 15, confronting Young in a winning effort in a match to determine the third challenger for the TNA World Heavyweight Championship at the main event of the show, which included Matt Hardy and Ethan Carter III, but the match ended in a no contest after interference from Young along with Bram. On the next week's Impact, Jeff won a gauntlet match after last eliminating his brother Matt to determine the number one contender of the TNA World Heavyweight Championship. On the March 29 episode of Impact Wrestling, Jeff faced TNA World Heavyweight Champion Drew Galloway in a losing effort. On April 5, Jeff defeated Young in a steel cage match after a Swanton Bomb from the top of the cage. On April 12, Jeff confronted his brother Matt, after Matt declared that Jeff was not worthy of the Hardy name. Matt would then challenge Jeff for an "I Quit" match on the next week's Impact, while Jeff demanded a Full Metal Mayhem match. In the main event, Jeff Hardy and Drew Galloway would face Matt Hardy and Tyrus in a tag team match with the stipulation that the winning Hardy would get their match type on the next week's Impact. Jeff and Galloway went on to lose the match after Jeff received a Twist of Fate from Matt and as per pre-match stipulations, on next week's Impact, Jeff faced Matt in an "I Quit" match, which resulted in a no contest after both Hardys refused to quit. On May 10 episode of Impact Wrestling, Jeff was James Storm's tag team partner in a rematch for the TNA World Tag Team Championship against Decay (Abyss and Crazzy Steve) in a losing effort after an imposter Willow distracted Jeff. After the match, Jeff searched backstage for the imposter Willow and would end up being attacked by three different people dressed as Willow. Matt Hardy, now known as Broken Matt returned on the May 17 episode of Impact Wrestling revealing himself to be one of the imposter Willows and behind the attacks on his brother Jeff. He would later attack Jeff after the main event. On the May 24 episode of Impact Wrestling, Jeff had to beat Rockstar Spud and Tyrus to get his Full Metal Mayhem match with Matt at Slammiversary, which he did, and the match was made official by Dixie Carter for Slammiversary. On the May 31 episode of Impact Wrestling, Matt invited Jeff to his house to document "Brother Nero's personal Armageddon", where at the end Matt hit Jeff with a Side Effect through a table before Matt signed the contract for the match. On the June 7 episode of Impact Wrestling, Matt defeated Drew Galloway by disqualification. Afterwards, Matt remained in the ring when the lights went out. A laugh was heard and when the lights came back on, the fans at ringside were wearing the Willow masks and chanting for Willow. Four Willows walked out on stage and the actual Willow (on screen) cut a promo on Matt calling him a joke. Jeff Hardy then walked out and attacked Matt.

On the March 29 episode of Impact Wrestling Mike Bennett declined a challenge issued to him by Ethan Carter III, leading to Bennett attacking Carter and officially starting a feud between the two. During the April 12 episode of Impact Wrestling, Bennett and Carter had a match that ended in disqualification when Carter attacked Bennett with a steel chair. On the April 26 episode of Impact Wrestling: Sacrifice, Bennett defeated Carter by pinfall, ending Carter's unpinned streak. On the May 10 episode of Impact Wrestling, Bennett declined another challenge from Carter unless Carter faced three of his former enemies; if Carter won all the three matches, then he would get to face Bennett at Slammiversary, to which Carter agreed. His first match was against Rockstar Spud in a Six Sides of Steel match, which Carter won. On the May 17 episode of Impact Wrestling, Carter's second match was against Tyrus in a Last Man Standing match, which Carter won. On the May 24 episode of Impact Wrestling, Carter won his last match against Matt Hardy, but Bennett refused to give him his rematch, since Carter won by disqualification. On the May 31 episode of Impact Wrestling, Carter was put in charge of the show, and he made the match between himself and Bennett official for Slammiversary.

At the February 23 Impact Wrestling: Lockdown television special, Madison Rayne was attacked by an unknown assailant. Afterwards, Gail Kim would ask Maria to take Rayne's place for the Lethal Lockdown match between the team of Rayne, Kim and Velvet Sky against The Dollhouse (Jade, Marti Bell and Rebel), to which Maria agreed, however, by the time of the match came, Maria turned on Kim and Sky and locked them in the cage, turning the match into a 3-on-2 handicap match, leading them to be defeated by The Dollhouse. The following week, Maria would be confronted by Kim, but Jade attacked her on the way to the entrance ramp, then Kim successfully defended her TNA Knockouts Championship against Jade the next week. On the March 22 episode of Impact Wrestling, Maria announced that she gave up the shot at the TNA Knockouts Championship she was given and called upon the Dollhouse, creating tension and initiated an impromptu one contender's match between them, which was won by Jade, breaking up the Dollhouse in the process. The following week, Jade defeated Gail Kim and Madison Rayne to become the new TNA Knockouts Champion. Maria demanded Jade to hand her the Knockouts Championship on the April 12 episode of Impact Wrestling, but she refused and was then interrupted by Kim, Bell, Rebel, and the rest of the Knockouts division, which led to TNA Management Director Billy Corgan coming out and announcing a ladder match to determine the "leader of the Knockouts", which was won by Maria. Maria proclaimed on the May 3 episode of Impact Wrestling that without her, Jade would not be champion, so Maria asked her to lie down on the mat and let herself be pinned by Maria, proclaiming that she deserved that championship, but Jade refused; Maria then introduced a new Knockout named Sienna, who would go on to defeat Jade in a non-title match with ease. Gail Kim cashed in her rematch clause against Jade on the May 10 episode of Impact Wrestling, but the match ended in disqualification after Sienna attacked Kim and Jade. On the May 17 episode of Impact Wrestling, Sienna defeated Velvet Sky with Sky's job on the line. On May 24, Kim would defeat Sienna to keep her job. After the match, Sienna and Maria assaulted Kim. On the May 31 episode of Impact Wrestling, Kim teamed with her former rival Jade to defeat Allie and Sienna; special guest general manager Ethan Carter III later announced that Kim would face Maria at Slammiversary. On June 7, 2016, Sienna defeated Madison Rayne to earn a shot against TNA Knockouts Champion Jade at Slammiversary. Maria revealed on her Instagram account on June 10 that she suffered a broken hand, and therefore she was not medically cleared to compete at Slammiversary and her match with Kim was called off. Kim was therefore added to the Knockouts Championship match, making it a triple threat match.

On the May 31 episode of Impact Wrestling, The BroMans defeated Rockstar Spud and Tyrus in a number one contender's match for the TNA World Tag Team Championship, for the right to face Decay (Abyss and Crazzy Steve) at Slammiversary for the titles. On the June 7 episode of Impact Wrestling, Decay, alongside TNA King of the Mountain Champion L. A. Knight, Basile Baracca and Baron Dax defeated the team of The BroMans, Bram, Grado and Mahabali Shera.

L. A. Knight cashed in his Feast or Fired briefcase for his shot at the TNA King of the Mountain Championship on the May 31 episode of Impact Wrestling, defeating Bram by viciously attacking him after his match with Lashley, winning his first title in TNA. Two days later on June 2, it was announced by Dixie Carter through her official Facebook page that Bram would get his rematch at Slammiversary. On the June 7 episode of Impact Wrestling, Drake, alongside Decay, Basile Baraka and Baron Dax defeated the team of Bram, Grado, Mahabali Shera and The BroMans.

On the March 29 episode of Impact Wrestling, Al Snow returned as a heel attacking Grado backstage. On the April 5 episode of Impact Wrestling TNA Management Director Billy Corgan suspended Snow for the week without pay and said next week he must apologize. When Snow returned from his suspension week, he claimed that the ease with which new talents today earn respect and a name in the professional wrestling business drove him crazy, as he and others of his and generations before him needed to be quiet for a long time and fight hard to prove themselves worthy back then. He invited Mahabali Shera to the ring and apologized to him for attacking him and Grado, breaking Grado's arm in the process. Shera shook hands with him, only for Snow to betray and attack him once they went out of the ring. In a backstage segment, Snow said angrily he didn't need to apologize and explain himself to rookies and if they want his apology and respect they need to defeat him in a match. On the April 19 episode of Impact Wrestling Snow had a match with Shera in which before and during the match he blamed the direction of professional wrestling on the fans and said they were cowards for seating behind the barricades and not coming to the ring to face him. Snow eventually won the match. On the May 10 episode of Impact Wrestling, Shera and Snow had a rematch in which Shera won after Grado involved himself in the match to prevent Snow from using cheating tactics to win. On the May 24 episode of Impact Wrestling, Snow went on to win a street fight against Grado with the help of two unknown men, which were revealed on May 31 as The Tribunal (Basile Baraka and Baron Dax), which later were confronted by Grado and Shera, but The Tribunal beat them down. It was announced on June 3 by Dixie Carter through her Twitter social media account that a tag team match between the two team would take place at the PPV. On the June 7 episode of Impact Wrestling, Baracca and Dax, alongside Decay and TNA King of the Mountain Champion Eli Drake, defeated the team of Grado, Shera, Bram and The BroMans.

On the June 7, 2016 episode of Impact Wrestling, Braxton Sutter made his debut defeating local talent Bill Callous, and after the match, Jeremy Borash interviewed Sutter, who proclaimed he would be giving an open challenge at the PPV.

TNA announced on their official website that the Slammiversary opening match would be a four-way match for the TNA X Division Championship. The participants would be X Division Champion Trevor Lee, Andrew Everett, Eddie Edwards and DJZ.

== Results ==
No.	Results	Stipulations	Times
1^{D}	Mandrews defeated Paredyse	Singles match	07:07
2	Eddie Edwards defeated Trevor Lee (c), Andrew Everett and DJZ	Four-way match for the TNA X Division Championship	10:12
3	The Tribunal (Baron Dax and Basile Baraka) (with Al Snow) defeated Grado and Mahabali Shera	Tag Team match	07:39
4	Sienna (with Allie and Maria) defeated Jade (c) and Gail Kim	Three-way match for the TNA Knockouts Championship	08:11
5	James Storm defeated Braxton Sutter	Singles match	07:06
6	Eli Drake (c) defeated Bram	Singles match for the TNA King of the Mountain Championship	08:36
7	Ethan Carter III defeated Mike Bennett (with Maria)	Singles match	15:01
8	Jeff Hardy defeated Broken Matt	Full Metal Mayhem match	17:08
9	Decay (Abyss and Crazzy Steve) (c) (with Rosemary) defeated The BroMans (Jessie Godderz and Robbie E) (with Raquel)	Tag Team match for the TNA World Tag Team Championship	10:00
10	Lashley defeated Drew Galloway (c) by technical submission	Knockout or tapout only match for the TNA World Heavyweight Championship	17:04
(c) / – the champion(s) heading into the match; D / – this was a dark match

== See also ==
- 2016 in professional wrestling
