= Slammiversary XV =

2017 Impact Wrestling pay-per-view event

- Promotional poster featuring Lashley and Alberto El Patrón
- Promotion: Impact Wrestling
- Date: July 2, 2017
- City: Orlando, Florida
- Venue: Impact Zone
- Tagline: "15 Years in the making"

Pay-per-view chronology
← Previous; Bound for Glory	Next → Bound for Glory

Slammiversary chronology
← Previous; 2016	Next → XVI

Slammiversary XV was a professional wrestling pay-per-view (PPV) event produced by Impact Wrestling. It took place on July 2, 2017 at the Impact Zone in Orlando, Florida. It was the thirteenth event under the Slammiversary chronology and celebrates the fifteenth anniversary of the promotion. It was also the first PPV event to be held under the Impact Wrestling name.

The event included special appearances by TNA alums Shark Boy and James Mitchell, as well as members of American Top Team and El Hijo de Dos Caras.

In October 2017, with the launch of the Global Wrestling Network, the event became available to stream on demand.

Being that Impact Wrestling was working with Lucha Libre AAA Worldwide, The Crash Lucha Libre, and Pro Wrestling Noah representatives appeared at the show including Drago and El Hijo del Fantasma (AAA), Garza Jr. and Laredo Kid (The Crash) and Naomichi Marufuji and Taiji Ishimori (NOAH).

== Production ==
=== Storylines ===
Slammiversary featured professional wrestling matches involving different wrestlers from pre-existing scripted feuds and storylines. Wrestlers portrayed villains, heroes, or less distinguishable characters in the scripted events that built tension and culminate in a wrestling match or series of matches.

On the March 2, 2017, episode of Impact Wrestling, Alberto El Patrón debuted in Impact Wrestling, interrupting Bruce Prichard and Impact Wrestling World Heavyweight Champion Lashley in an attempt to insert himself into the Impact Wrestling World Heavyweight Championship picture. Lashley granted El Patrón a world title match. Later that night, El Patrón won the Impact Wrestling World Heavyweight Title over Lashley in controversial fashion. However, El Patrón relinquished the title the next night due to the controversial victory and faced Ethan Carter III in a world title number-one contenders match, which he won, becoming the number one contender in the process. On the April 20, 2017, episode of Impact Wrestling, Karen Jarrett announced that Global Force Wrestling and Impact Wrestling had officially merged including any related property. This led to May 11 El Patrón defeating Magnus to win the GFW Global Championship. Then on the June 1 episode of Impact Wrestling, El Patrón defeated Carter again this time for Patrón's GFW Global Champion and Carter opportunity to face Lashley at Slammiversary.

In April 2017, Bruce Prichard announced that James Storm was the new number-one contender to Lashley's World Heavyweight Championship, as voted by the Impact fans. EC3 came out to object and insisted the fans wanted him to face Lashley. On the April 20 episode of Impact Wrestling, EC3 interfered in Storm's title match allowing Lashley to retain the title, turning heel in the process. The following week on Impact Wrestling, Carter came out in a cowboy hat and boots, mocking Storm. The following week, Carter brutally assaulted a handcuffed Storm with his belt over 30 times. Over the following weeks, EC3 would lash his opponents and Impact officials, including Bruce Prichard. On the May 17 episode of Impact Wrestling, EC3 defeated Storm after Magnus interfered and prevented Storm from lashing EC3. EC3 would then go on to defeat Storm and Magnus in a Triple threat #1 contender's match, only to lose his Slammiversary shot to Alberto El Patrón. After, Storm came out and said EC3 would still be competing at Slammiversary, in a Strap Match against him.

In April, Josh Mathews had a series of arguments with fellow employee Jeremy Borash and the two began a heated feud, which seemed to culminate in a match where Borash & Mathews formed teams of four wrestlers to compete against each other, with Mathews' team losing, thus Mathews was no longer the lead-commentator. However, during Impact's return to UK screens Mathews returned to ringside accompanying Lashley, and joined Borash and D'Angelo Dinero, providing commentary, again belittling the wrestlers who the fans cheered for. At the end of the show, Borash, having heard enough of Mathews bullying punched Mathews in what many saw was a provoked attack. The next week at the start of the show, Mathews comes out to ringside and once again confronts Jeremy Borash - this time he has obviously filed a grievance with company management and says that Borash is suspended for 30 days, starting immediately. Borash is dismissed from ringside, aided by the heavy numbers of security personnel that accompanied Mathews to the ring - Mathews then proceeds to call the in-ring action for the remainder of the broadcast. Borash was later seen (off camera) watching the show as a member of the audience, having gone outside & then purchasing a ticket. On the April 27 episode of Impact Wrestling, then it was agreed a match between Borash and Joseph Park against Mathews and his partner. Later, Mathews revealed his partner to be Scott Steiner with Steiner attacking Park with the Steiner Recliner and Borash would leave the arena after being afraid that Steiner would attack him.

On January 5, 2017, Davey Richards made his return to TNA, helping Eddie Edwards retain the TNA World Heavyweight Championship, by stopping Lashley from hitting Edwards with the title. On the February 9 episode of Impact Wrestling, Richards turned heel by costing Edwards' TNA World Heavyweight Championship rematch against Lashley, by pulling the referee out of the ring which allowed Richards to hit Edwards with a title shot to the face while the referee was distracted by Angelina Love. Afterwards, Richards and his wife Angelina Love attacked Edwards and his wife Alisha Edwards, thus ending The Wolves in the process. Richards' character then went through a complete transformation, sporting new theme music, trunks, being infatuated with Love and calling himself "The Lone Wolf". On the February 16 episode of Impact Wrestling, Richards faced Edwards in a Street Fight, however the match ended in a no-contest. On the March 9 episode of Impact Wrestling, Richards brawled with Edwards at the beginning of the show, but the two were separated by security guards. On the April 6 episode of Impact Wrestling, Richards defeated Edwards in a Last Man Standing Match. This led to a Full Metal Mayhem match between both couples.

On the April 20 episode of Impact Wrestling, Sonjay Dutt surprised everyone by making his in-ring return in a six-way match for the Impact Wrestling X Division Championship. During the match after Low Ki hi with a foot in the eye of Dutt, Dutt sustained a serious eye injury which effectively ruled him out of the contest. After its conclusion Dutt was treated backstage by the Impact Wrestling medical team. Low Ki ended winning the match becoming a five time Impact Wrestling X Division Championship. Over the following weeks Dutt made his intentions of facing Low-Ki for the X-Division Championship. On June 8 Impact Wrestling broadcast their first show in India with Low Ki retaining his X-Division Championship against Caleb Konley. During the match Low Ki's eye was busted open. After the match Dutt confronted Low Ki for injuring his eye and how Low Ki's eye was busted open; Dutt then asked Low Ki for a shot for the X-Division Championship. The following week Dutt defeated Low Ki to win for the first time ever the X-Division Championship. This led to a two-out-of-three falls match for the X-Division Championship.

On April 21, 2017, Sienna defeated Christina Von Eerie to win the GFW Women's Championship, making her the first woman to have held the Impact Wrestling Knockouts Championship and the GFW Women's Title. Then weeks later after Sienna was feuding with Allie and on the May 25 episode of Impact Wrestling, the Impact Wrestling Knockouts Champion Rosemary rushed the ring while Allie was being double-teamed by Laurel Van Ness and Sienna. As they tried to convince her to join in, she instead attacked them, turning face in the process. The next week, Allie asked Rosemary why she saved her. Rosemary explained that "the hive" sent her to protect Allie, beginning a storyline. On the June 8 episode of Impact Wrestling, Rosemary successfully defended the Knockouts Championship against Laurel Van Ness. After the match, Van Ness and Sienna attacked Rosemary, prompting Allie to come down to fend them off with a kendo stick. Then this led a match between Sienna and Rosemary for the Impact Wrestling Knockouts Championship and the GFW Women's Championship.

== Event ==
Other on-screen personnel
Commentator	Robert Flores
Commentator	Don West
Ring announcer	David Penzer
Referee	Earl Hebner
Referee	Brian Hebner
Referee	Brian Stiffler
Interviewers	McKenzie Mitchell

== Results ==
No.	Results	Stipulations	Times
1^{P}	Allie, Braxton Sutter and Mahabali Shera defeated KM, Kongo Kong and Laurel Van Ness	Six-person tag team match	7:05
2	Latin American Xchange (Santana and Ortiz) (c) (with Diamante, Homicide and Konnan) (Impact) defeated Drago and El Hijo del Fantasma (AAA), Garza Jr. and Laredo Kid (The Crash) and Naomichi Marufuji and Taiji Ishimori (NOAH)	Four-way tag team match for the Impact Wrestling World and GFW Tag Team Championships	14:40
3	DeAngelo Williams and Moose (with Austin Dillon and Gary Barnidge) defeated Chris Adonis and Eli Drake	Tag team match	10:40
4	Ethan Carter III defeated James Storm	Strap match	10:50
5	Jeremy Borash and Joseph Park (Note: As both teams are fighting on the concourse, Joseph Park was nowhere to be seen, so Abyss filled in for him and won the match.) defeated Josh Mathews and Scott Steiner	No Disqualification match	10:52
6	Alisha Edwards and Eddie Edwards defeated Angelina Love and Davey Richards	Intergender tag team Full Metal Mayhem match	8:30
7	Sonjay Dutt (c) defeated Low Ki 2-1	2-out-of-3 falls match for the Impact Wrestling X Division Championship	18:20
8	Sienna (GFW) defeated Rosemary (Impact) by submission	Unification match for the Impact Wrestling Knockouts and GFW Women's Championships	10:31
9	Alberto El Patrón (GFW) (with Dos Caras) defeated Lashley (Impact) (with King Mo)	Unification match for the Impact Wrestling World Heavyweight and GFW Global Championships into the Unified GFW World Heavyweight Championship	18:05
(c) / – the champion(s) heading into the match; P / – the match was broadcast on the pre-show

X Division 2-out-of 3 Falls match

Score	Fall	Notes
Low Ki	0-1	Pinned after a Warrior's Way.
Sonjay Dutt	1-1	Pinned with a roll-up.
Sonjay Dutt	2-1	Pinned after a top-rope moonsault reverse diving double foot stomp.

== See also ==
- 2017 in professional wrestling
