= NXT TakeOver: Fatal 4-Way =

2014 WWE Network event

- Promotional poster featuring Adrian Neville, Tyler Breeze, Sami Zayn, and Tyson Kidd
- Promotion: WWE
- Brand: NXT
- Date: September 11, 2014
- City: Winter Park, Florida
- Venue: Full Sail University
- Attendance: 400+

WWE event chronology
← Previous; SummerSlam	Next → Night of Champions

NXT TakeOver chronology
← Previous; TakeOver	Next → R Evolution

Fatal 4-Way chronology
← Previous; WWE Fatal 4-Way	Next → Final

NXT TakeOver: Fatal 4-Way was a 2014 professional wrestling livestreaming event produced by WWE, held exclusively for wrestlers from the promotion's developmental territory, NXT. It was the second NXT TakeOver event and took place on Thursday, September 11, 2014, at NXT's home venue at the time, Full Sail University in Winter Park, Florida. The event aired exclusively on the WWE Network and was also the promotion's second event to carry the Fatal 4-Way name, after WWE's eponymous pay-per-view event in June 2010. The event centered on its main event, which was a fatal four-way match, a four-person free-for-all where the first wrestler to score a pinfall or submission wins.

The event consisted of six matches. In the main event, Adrian Neville defeated Sami Zayn, Tyler Breeze, and Tyson Kidd in the titular fatal four-way match to retain the NXT Championship. Also on the show, Charlotte defeated Bayley to retain the NXT Women's Championship, and The Lucha Dragons (Kailsto and Sin Cara) won the NXT Tag Team Championship from The Ascension (Konnor and Viktor). Japanese wrestler Hideo Itami also made his NXT debut at the show.

== Production ==
=== Background ===
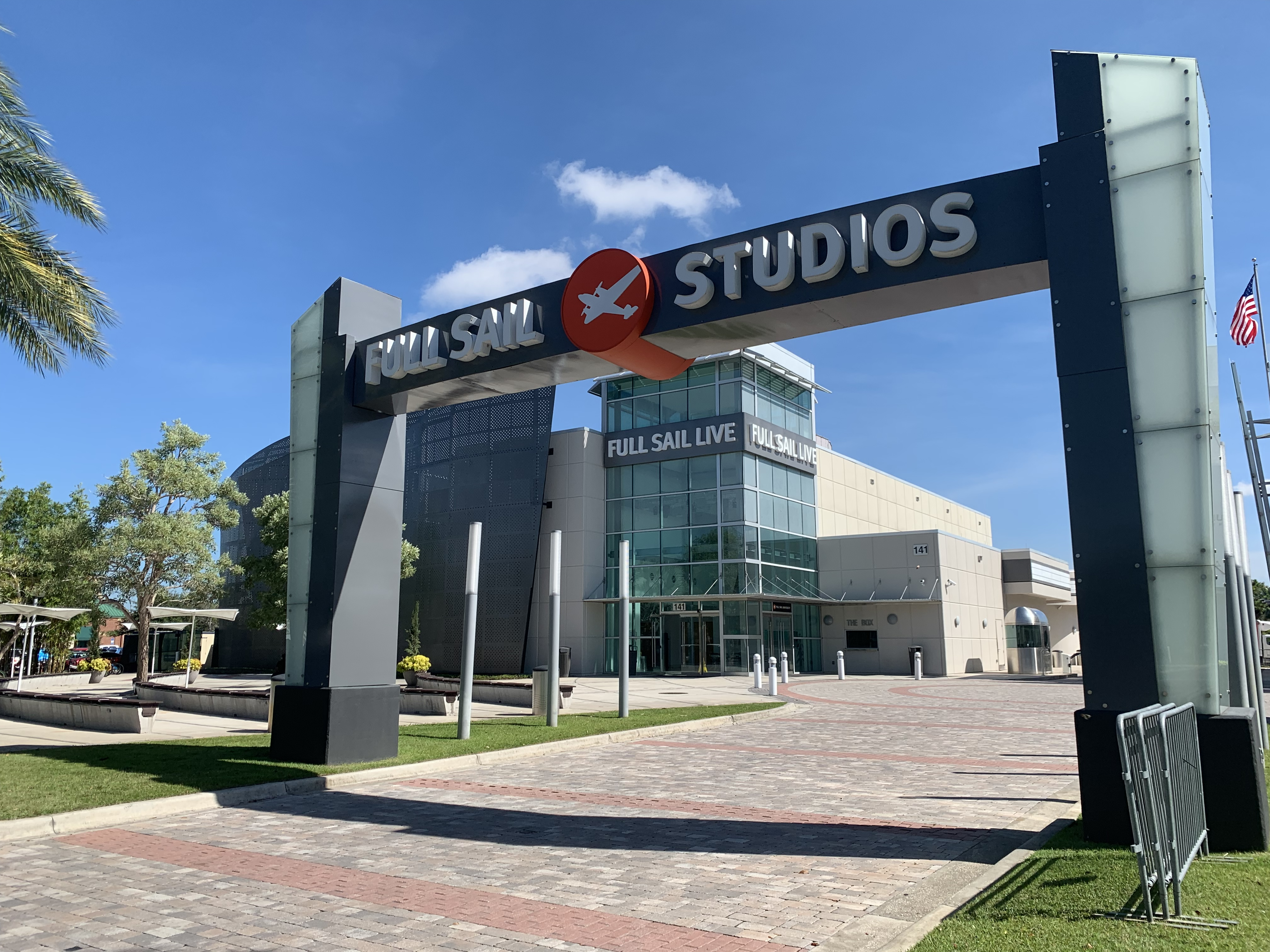
The second NXT TakeOver event was held at NXT's home venue at the time, Full Sail University in Winter Park, Florida.

In May 2014, WWE held a professional wrestling livestreaming event titled TakeOver for its developmental territory, NXT, and it aired exclusively on the WWE Network. NXT's next WWE Network livestreaming event was titled as TakeOver: Fatal 4-Way. With the announcement of this second TakeOver event, the "TakeOver" name was established as the branding used by WWE for all of NXT's major events held periodically throughout the year. Fatal 4-Way was scheduled to take place on Saturday, September 11, 2014, at NXT's home venue at the time, Full Sail University in Winter Park, Florida.

WWE previously held a pay-per-view (PPV) event titled Fatal 4-Way in June 2010 for its two main roster brands, Raw and SmackDown. The event centered on the fatal four-way match, a four-person free-for-all where the first wrestler to score a pinfall or submission wins. This 2010 event was WWE's only PPV event to carry the Fatal 4-Way name, after which, the promotion revived the name for this second NXT TakeOver event. Like the 2010 event, TakeOver: Fatal 4-Way also centered on the titular match, which was contested as the main event.

=== Storylines ===
The card comprised six matches that resulted from scripted storylines. Results were predetermined by WWE's writers on the NXT brand, while storylines were produced on WWE's weekly television program, NXT.

On February 27, 2014, Adrian Neville defeated Bo Dallas to win the NXT Championship at Arrival. On the May 8 episode of NXT a 20-man battle royal with the winner facing Neville for the NXT Championship ended in a 3-way tie between Sami Zayn, Tyson Kidd, and Tyler Breeze. The next week, Kidd won a Triple Threat match between the three to earn a title match at the first TakeOver, which he lost. That same night, Tyler Breeze cheated his way to victory over Sami Zayn to earn a title match. After this, Neville, Zayn, Breeze and Kidd became involved in a 4-way feud, leading to a fatal four-way match for the title at the event.

In August 2013, Bayley started to team with Charlotte on a regular basis, but they were almost immediately targeted by the BFFs ("Beautiful Fierce Females", Summer Rae and Sasha Banks) as they attempted to convince Bayley to join their side. This storyline culminated with Charlotte turning on Bayley during a match, promptly joining the BFFs instead. On May 1, 2014, Bayley failed to advance in a tournament for the vacant NXT Women's Championship after losing to Sasha in the first round. On June 12, Bayley earned a pinfall over Charlotte, the new NXT Women's Champion, in a six-woman tag team match. In August, Bayley defeated Sasha Banks to become the #1 contender for the Women's championship held by Charlotte.

== Event ==
=== Preliminary matches ===
The event opened with The Ascension (Konnor and Viktor) defending the NXT Tag Team Championship against The Lucha Dragons (Kalisto and Sin Cara). The match ended when Kalisto executed a "Salida Del Sol" on Viktor to win the title.

In the second match, Baron Corbin fought CJ Parker. Corbin executed the "End of Days" on Parker, scoring a pin after only 29 seconds.

After this, Sylvester Lefort and Enzo Amore faced each other in a hair vs. hair match. Amore pinned Lefort with a roll-up for the win. As Lefort quickly left after the match, his partner Marcus Louis had his hair cut instead.

NXT General manager William Regal introduced Kenta, who was making his debut. During his introduction, Kenta announced that he would be known as "Hideo Itami" (meaning "Hero of Pain") from that point on. Moments later, they were interrupted by The Ascension, who were still angry over losing their NXT Tag Team Championship, and they attacked Itami. Konnor demanded a rematch, but Itami attacked The Ascension and chased them away.

The fourth match saw Bull Dempsey wrestle Mojo Rawley. Dempsey executed a diving headbutt on Rawley for the win.

In the penultimate match, Charlotte defended the NXT Women's Championship against Bayley. The match ended when Charlotte executed "Natural Selection" on Bayley to retain the title.

=== Main event ===
In the main event, Adrian Neville defended the NXT Championship against Sami Zayn, Tyler Breeze and Tyson Kidd in a fatal-four-way match. During the match, Kidd executed a swinging fisherman's neckbreaker on Zayn for a near-fall. Breeze executed a "Beauty Shot" on Zayn, a "Supermodel Kick" to Kidd and a dropkick in mid-air on Neville. After Neville executed a shooting star press on Zayn, Breeze threw Neville out of the ring and pinned Zayn for a near-fall. Zayn executed a "Helluva Kick" on Kidd, but Neville broke up the pinfall attempt by pulling the referee out of the ring. Neville then performed a "Red Arrow" on Kidd to retain the title.

== Results ==
No.	Results	Stipulations	Times
1	The Lucha Dragons (Kalisto and Sin Cara) defeated The Ascension (Konnor and Viktor) (c)	Tag team match for the NXT Tag Team Championship	07:48
2	Baron Corbin defeated CJ Parker	Singles match	00:29
3	Enzo Amore (with Colin Cassady) defeated Sylvester Lefort (with Marcus Louis)	Hair vs. Hair match (Note: Sylvester Lefort ran away after losing his match, leaving his tag team partner Marcus Louis to lose his hair instead.)	05:38
4	Bull Dempsey defeated Mojo Rawley	Singles match	01:10
5	Charlotte (c) defeated Bayley	Singles match for the NXT Women's Championship	10:40
6	Adrian Neville (c) defeated Tyson Kidd, Tyler Breeze, and Sami Zayn	Fatal 4-Way match for the NXT Championship	24:12
(c) / – the champion(s) heading into the match

=== NXT Tag Team Championship #1 Contender's Tournament ===
1st Round; NXT; July 17, 2014 (August 7–14)
Lucha Dragons (Kalisto and Sin Cara)	Pinfall
Blake and Murphy (Buddy Murphy and Wesley Blake)	2:45
Adam Rose and Sami Zayn	Pinfall
Justin Gabriel and Tyson Kidd	9:15
The Vaudevillains (Aiden English and Simon Gotch)	Pinfall
Bull Dempsey and Mojo Rawley	3:05
Enzo and Cass (Enzo Amore and Colin Cassady)	Pinfall
Jason Jordan and Tye Dillinger	5:15

Semifinals; NXT; July 31, 2014 (Aired: August 21)
Lucha Dragons	Pinfall
Adam Rose and Sami Zayn	8:00
The Vaudevillains	Pinfall
Enzo and Cass	1:45

Final; NXT; July 31, 2014 (Aired: September 4)
Lucha Dragons	Pinfall
The Vaudevillains	5:20
