= Sylvester Lefort =

French professional wrestler (born 1984)

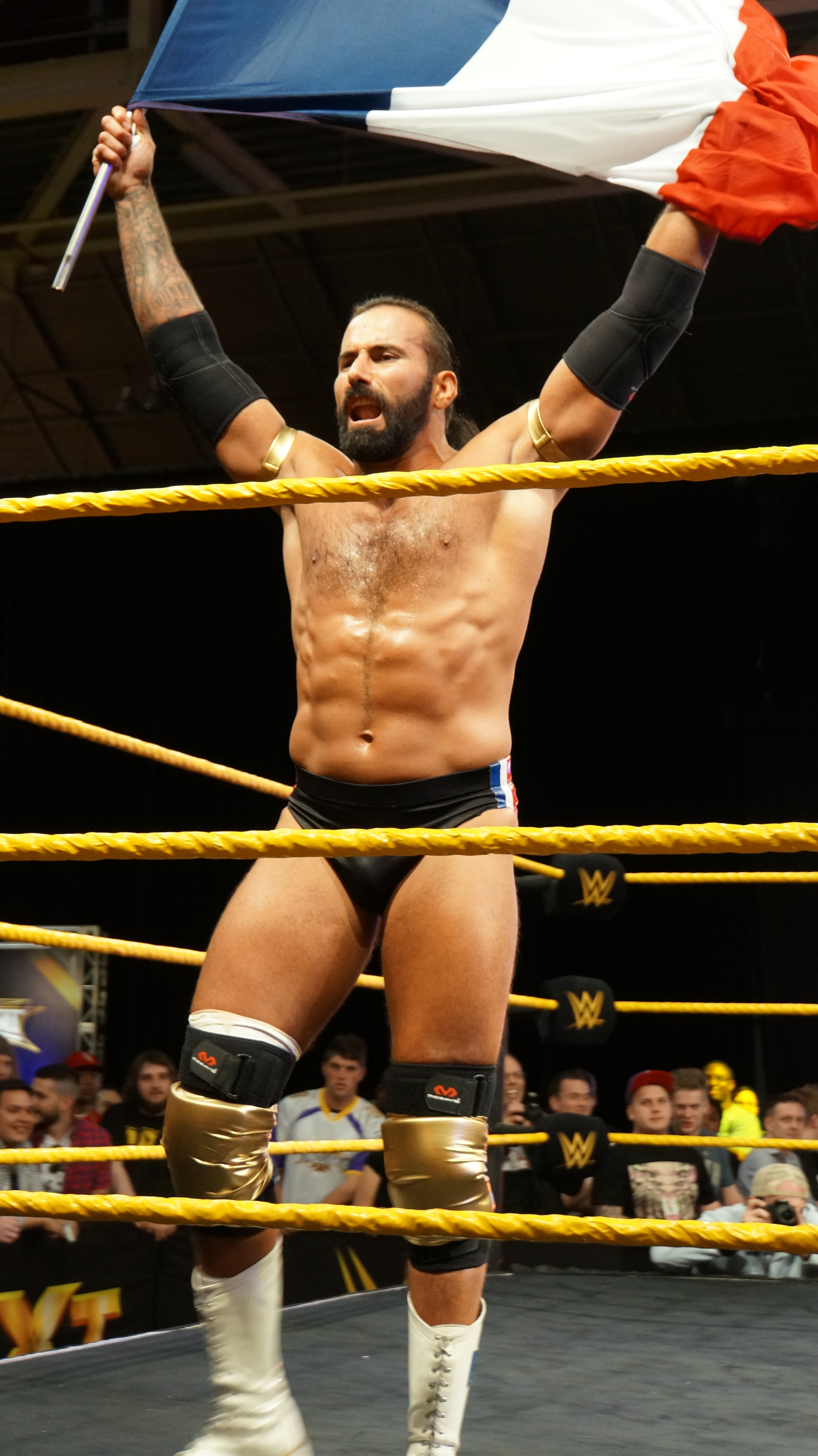
- LaRuffa in 2014

Personal information
- Born: Thomas La Ruffa; May 4, 1984 (age 42) Nice, Provence-Alpes-Côte d'Azur, France

Professional wrestling career
- Ring name(s): Basile Baraka; Eagle Mask; French Stallion; Sylvester Lefort; Tom LaRuffa
- Billed height: 1.80 m (5 ft 11 in)
- Billed weight: 200 lb (91 kg)
- Billed from: Nice, France
- Trained by: Lance Storm
- Debut: November 19, 2006

Thomas La Ruffa (born May 4, 1984) is a French professional wrestler wrestling under the ring name Tom LaRuffa. He is best known for his time in WWE, in their developmental territory NXT as Sylvester Lefort, and for his time in Total Nonstop Action Wrestling (TNA) under the ring name Basile Baraka.

== Professional wrestling career ==
=== Early career (2006–2007) ===
La Ruffa was trained by Lance Storm at the Storm Wrestling Academy and finished training in 2006.

On November 19, 2006, La Ruffa made his debut in the squared circle as he lost a match at Power Zone Wrestling in Canada.

On January 13, 2007, La Ruffa made his debut for International Catch Wrestling Alliance, during a 2 weeks tour of the French island La Réunion in the Indian Ocean, under the name of Eagle Mask and teamed with Pierre Fontaine to lose to the UK Pitbulls. La Ruffa teamed up with Robert Ray to take part in the Lethal Lottery Tag Team tournament and reached the finals of the tournament before being knocked out by Big Dave and Charlie Rage. As a singles competitor he participated in the ICWA 16 Carat Gold tournament, in the preliminary qualification match he would lose to Bulk. For most of 2007 he competed in various other French promotions such as Association Biterroise de Catch, Fighting Spirit Federation and Queen of Chaos. In the summer of 2007, he toured with Nu Wrestling Evolution in Italy, where he faced the world champion Romeo Roselli. His final matches in 2007 were at the Spanish promotion Super Wrestling Alliance where he competed as both Eagle Mask and Tom LaRuffa and didn't suffer any losses in the promotion.

He returned to France in June 2008. In the semifinal of ICWA's Japan Expo 2008 tournament in Paris, he lost to Metal Master. On the same event, he also teamed with Bryan Danielson. On August 2, he took on Joe E. Legend in an unsuccessful challenge for the ICWA World Heavyweight Championship. LaRuffa took on Yan Colby in a no disqualification, loser leaves ICWA match which Yan Colby won.

=== North American tours (2007–2008) ===
In September 2007, La Ruffa to train at the NWA Pro Dojo in San Bernardino, California. There he received additional training with Rocky Romero, Karl Anderson, and T. J. Perkins. In October, he would debut in Mexico, wrestling on Lucha Libre shows in Mexicali. he would also take part to the infamous San Francisco's Cow Palace Fan Festival on October 20, where he teamed with TNA's Lance Hoyt to face Shark Boy and Abyss. On November 4, La Ruffa would debut for Empire Wrestling Federation as the French Stallion and defeat Country Bear. Throughout the month of November, La Ruffa would form various tag teams which never quite worked as he lost all his tag team matches. In his last match for EWF for about a year, he lost to Ronin.

From January to March 2008, back to Calgary, Canada, Tom assisted Lance Storm in training his January 2008 camp. On January 18, 2008, he debuted in Stampede Wrestling and lost to T-Bone. He went on to work for various promotions throughout Alberta like Prairie Wrestling Alliance. Powerzone Wrestling or Real Canadian Wrestling, having feuds with Brady Roberts and T-Bone Jack Sloan. On April 4, 2008, La Ruffa would return to EWF and defeating Rockstar Cordova in his return match. His 2008 tour would prove to be much better than his 2007 tour. He defeated Human Tornado and Ryan Taylor in a triple threat match and went on to challenge the EWF Heavyweight Champion Brandon Gatson in an unsuccessful effort. His tour of America would end on a low losing all his matches in his final few months at EWF. While in EWF, La Ruffa teamed with fellow Storm Wrestling Academy graduate and WWE developmental talent Mike Dalton. Before heading back to Europe in mid-2008, La Ruffa had several WWE try outs in California. He appeared briefly in the background of a backstage segment.

=== Wrestling Stars (2008–2012) ===
On September 4, 2008, La Ruffa debuted for Wrestling Stars, France's top promotion and one of the longest-running in all of Europe. La Ruffa enjoyed most of his recent success there and established himself as one of Europe's top talent while fighting against the continent's best competitors and making a name for himself through YouTube videos. While in WS, he took on a Greek warrior gimmick, then was taken under the wings of famous French pro wrestlers Flesh Gordon, Prince Zefy and Monsieur Jacky (Jacky Richard). He proceeded to headline shows all over his native country, often wrestling three shows per weekend, two matches per nights.

His greatest feuds in WS were against Sir Robin Lequimez, Murat Bosporus, Mikey Diamonds (Mikey Whiplash, to whom he lost All Star Wrestling's World Heavy Middleweight Championship in Croydon, UK, in March), Ghent Wakefiel and fellow French WS Star David Michel.

His WS career has been featured in many press articles and TV appearances. One of the most notable was a documentary on his life couple with the daughter of WS top star and 40 years veteran of French rings Flesh Gordon : Lili Gordon for NT1's Tous Differents TV show. The featurette, aired nationally on prime-time French TV, ran for half an hour and showed how Tom and Lili (WS ring announcer at the time) were dealing with distances in their couple (he lived in Nice, and she was in Paris), how wrestling played in their life especially with Tom's upcoming opportunity at France's national Catch Championship, and whether their love could outlive all these issues. It didn't, as Tom pursued his dream, and Lili started to go to an acting school.

In May 2011, Tom became the first and only French pro wrestler to ever wrestle professionally on Turkish soil, for Turkish Power Wrestling, against Murat Bosporus.

=== World of Hurt (2010–2011) ===
La Ruffa's biggest hit internationally came with the World of Hurt series, Season One. A reality documentary television series, in which Lance Storm would train 10 former students to help them make it to the next level. La Ruffa portrayed the "French Stallion" character in what many consider a show stealing performance, as he appeared to be the most arrogant, obnoxious, and attention-seeking jerk ever. The series was filmed in December 2010 in Calgary, Alberta, Canada, and began airing in May 2011.

=== WWE (2012–2016; 2024) ===
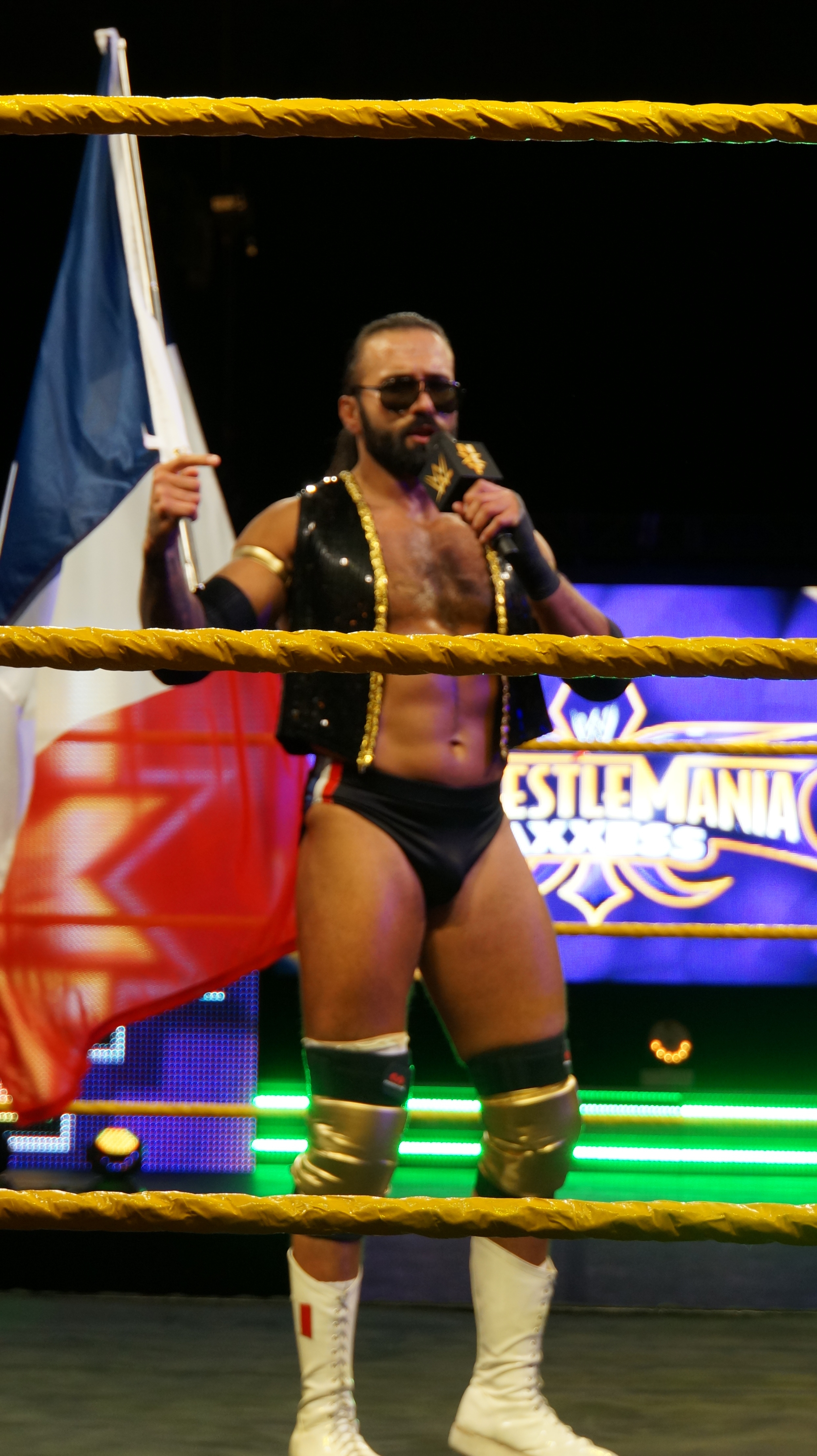
La Ruffa in 2014 at WrestleMania Axxess

In November 2011, La Ruffa wrestled a single appearance on SmackDown as a local wrestler who along with two others wrestlers Andy Baker and Zak Zodiac and lost a handicap match against Big Show. In August 2012, WWE signed La Ruffa to a developmental contract. In WWE's developmental territory NXT Wrestling, La Ruffa took up the ring name Sylvester Lefort, and his NXT television debut took place on the May 29, 2013 episode of NXT, where he (as a rich Frenchman) managed the tag team of Garrett Dylan and Scott Dawson (two Southerners) in a win over Travis Tyler and Baron Corbin. After Dylan and Dawson lost a number one contender match for the NXT Tag Team Championship to Corey Graves and Kassius Ohno on the June 26 episode of NXT, Dylan was released from WWE in August 2013, but Lefort continued to manage Dawson. He also began managing Alexander Rusev. He made his NXT in-ring debut teaming with Rusev in a win over Enzo Amore and Colin Cassady. During the match, Rusev turned on Lefort and sided with the debuting Lana. Lefort went on to lose to Rusev in a singles match. With Dawson injured, Lefort began to wrestle in singles competition, losing to Mason Ryan in early 2014.

Lefort formed a new tag team with Marcus Louis as "The Legionnaires", playing up a gimmick based on their French heritage. They wrestled their first televised match on the May 8 NXT losing to a debuting Kalisto & El Local, then on December 19, in a triple threat tag team elimination match against Colin Cassady and Angelo Dawkins, and The Ascension (Konnor and Viktor), which was won by Cassady and Dawkins. On the May 8 NXT, The Legionnaires began a feud with Enzo Amore and Colin Cassady. Lefort faced Enzo Amore in a Hair vs Hair match at NXT TakeOver: Fatal 4-Way and was defeated, but did not adhere to the stipulation post-match and instead ran away, leaving his partner Louis to have a bucket of hair removal cream dumped on his head instead. The following weeks Lefort tried to get revenge on Enzo Amore and Colin Cassady. On the October 16 episode of NXT, Louis finally snapped and turned on Lefort and attacked him during a tag match.

On June 24, 2015, after an 8-month hiatus from NXT programming, Lefort returned to team with Jason Jordan in a losing effort to Enzo Amore and Colin Cassady. In November 2015, Lefort began managing Billie Kay at NXT house shows. On February 5, 2016, it was announced that La Ruffa had been released from his WWE contract.

Lefort made an appearance on the May 3, 2024 episode of SmackDown, held in France, where Lefort played a security guard during the R-KO segment featuring Randy Orton, Kevin Owens and The Bloodline, with Lefort being slammed on the French announcers' desk by Orton.

=== Total Nonstop Action Wrestling (2016) ===
On March 17, 2016, La Ruffa (sporting a new bald look) and Pierre Marceau made their TNA debuts during the Impact Wrestling tapings, losing to BroMans (Robbie E and Jessie Godderz). On March 23, they signed a contract with TNA, with La Ruffa being renamed "Basile Baraka". On the May 24 episode of Impact Wrestling, Baraka and Baron Dax made their televised debut, attacking Grado and Mahabali Shera, and aligned himself with Al Snow. On the following episode of Impact Wrestling, the faction revealed their name as "The Tribunal". Baraka and Dax made their first pay-per-view appearance at Slammiversary against Grado and Shera, where they emerged victorious. On the June 14 episode of Impact Wrestling, The Tribunal competed in a 4-Way match for the TNA World Tag Team Championship but failed to win the match. At Turning Point, Dax competed in a battle royal to become #1 contender for TNA World Heavyweight Championship, but failed to win the match.

At Bound for Glory, Baraka competed in Gauntlet for Gold Battle Royal which was won by Eli Drake. On the October 20 episode of Impact Wrestling, The Tribunal got a shot at the TNA World Tag Team Championship but lost to The Hardys. On the November 10 episode of Impact Wrestling, as The Tribunal brutally attacked Al Snow, ending their alliance, and Mahabali Shera made the save. On the December 8 episode of Impact Wrestling, The Tribunal competed in their final match for TNA where they lost a Double Strap Match to Snow and Shera. On December 10, it was reported that Baraka has parted ways with TNA.

=== Independent circuit (2016–present) ===
La Ruffa is currently working for various promotions under the ring name Tom LaRuffa.

La Ruffa competed in the WCPW Pro Wrestling World Cup in the "Rest of the World" bracket, representing France. He lost his first round match against Jurn Simmons, who was representing Holland.

== Championships and accomplishments ==
- Association Biterroise de Catch
  - ABC Ultimate Championship (1 time, current)
  - ABC Tag Team Championship (1 time) – with Brian Anthony
- All Star Wrestling
  - World Mid-Heavyweight Championship (1 time)
- Ouest Catch
  - Ouest Catch Championship (1 time)
- Heritage Catch Pro
  - HCP Heritage World Championship (1 time)
- International Catch Wrestling Alliance
  - ICWA Heavyweight Championship (1 time)
- Pro Wrestling Cyprus
  - PWC Championship (2 times, current)
- Pro Wrestling Illustrated
  - PWI ranked him #200 of the 500 best singles wrestlers in the PWI 500 in 2016
- Tigers Pro Wrestling
  - TPW Championship (4 times)

=== Luchas de Apuestas record ===
Winner (wager)	Loser (wager)	Location	Event	Date	Notes
Enzo Amore (hair)	Sylvester Lefort (hair)	Orlando, Florida	NXT TakeOver: Fatal 4-Way	September 11, 2014	(Note: Lefort's tag team partner Marcus Louis ended up with his hair shaved off instead.)
