= Marcus Louis =

French professional wrestler (born 1983)

Personal information
- Born: Mikael Vierge; July 11, 1983 (age 43)

Professional wrestling career
- Ring name(s): Baron Dax; Marcus Louis; Mikael Vierge; Pierre Marceau
- Billed height: 6 ft 4 in (1.93 m)
- Billed weight: 245 lb (111 kg)
- Billed from: Bordeaux, France
- Trained by: Darren Burridge; WWE Performance Center
- Debut: December 17, 2005

Mikael Vierge (born July 11, 1983) is a French professional wrestler. He is best known for his appearances in the United States with WWE developmental brand NXT under the ring name Marcus Louis and in Impact Wrestling under the ring name Baron Dax.

== Professional wrestling career ==
=== Early career (2005–2013) ===
Vierge was trained by Darren Burridge. He debuted on December 17, 2005 for Irish Whip Wrestling working as Pierre Marceau.

With a background in kickboxing, he formerly wrestled as 'The French Paradoxx', Pierre Marceau. The earliest documented instance of Marceau's involvement in professional wrestling was when he accompanied 'the Snakeman' Vic Viper to a match for Irish Whip Wrestling (IWW) on 17 December 2005. In 2006, Marceau continued to wrestle in IWW, as well as in ACWA. While with IWW, Marceau wrestled at the Combined Clubs in Balbriggan, Ireland, along with future WWE wrestlers Drew Galloway and Sheamus O'Shaunessy.

=== WWE ===
==== NXT (2013–2016) ====
Marceau was documented to have been with WWE since September 2013. WWE describes him as having formerly played rugby, been in the French military riot police and worked in a psychiatric prison. As Marcus Louis, he made his television debut on the 12 February 2014 episode of NXT, tagging with Jason Jordan in a loss to Luke Harper and Erick Rowan of the Wyatt Family.

On the 8 May 2014 episode of NXT, Louis formed an alliance with Sylvester Lefort as two French characters representing 'the Legionnaires', and later participated unsuccessfully in a 20-man battle royal for a NXT Championship title shot. On the 26 June episode of NXT, Lefort and Louis attempted to attack Colin Cassady, who was saved by Enzo Amore. This was a continuation of Lefort's feud with Amore and Cassady back in September 2013.

At NXT TakeOver: Fatal 4-Way in September 2014, Lefort lost to Amore, and was thus supposed to lose his hair as per the match stipulation. However, Lefort ran away and Louis instead lost his hair and eyebrows via Amore and Cassady's hair removal cream. Louis initially persisted in his alliance with Lefort, hiding his lack of hair with headgear and a wig, only to lose to Amore in a singles match on the 25 September episode of NXT when his baldness was exposed. On the 16 October episode of NXT, Lefort accidentally knocked off Louis' wig, this led to Louis snapping and attacking Lefort. On the 30 October 2014 episode of NXT, Louis' character, now without entrance music, began screaming "You did this to me!" This coincided with Louis defeating Lefort in a singles match. This storyline led to Louis' character turning crazy, being described as a "baldy Kane version 2.0" by the Pro Wrestling Torch Newsletter.

On the 27 November 2014 episode of NXT, Louis lost to Tyler Breeze, who constantly taunted Louis as being ugly. This led to a storyline where Louis could not be found, only to resurface in January 2015 stalking Breeze from afar. Yet the storyline with Breeze was dropped when Louis returned months later in June, still bald and deranged, tagging again with Jason Jordan in a loss to the Vaudevillains. On the 12 August 2015 episode of NXT, Louis lost to NXT Champion Finn Bálor in a non-title match.

He then wrestled a string of tag team matches during the rest of the 2015 summer winding down toward the October month and into the fall season. Victories included winning a match with Sawyer Fulton and Solomon Crowe against Bull Dempsey, Mojo Rawley and Tucker Knight on October 30 and a win against Oscar Vasquez on December 3.

Louis wrestled only three more matches during the new year. All three matches occurred over the month of January 2016. Louis lost all three of his tag team matches. It was reported on February 5, Louis was released from the WWE.

=== Impact Wrestling (2016) ===
On March 17, 2016, Vierge and Thomas La Ruffa made their Impact Wrestling debuts during the Impact! tapings, losing to BroMans (Robbie E and Jessie Godderz). On March 23, 2016, it was announced Vierge had officially signed with Impact Wrestling. On the May 24 episode of Impact!, Vierge and La Ruffa made their televised debuts under the ring names Baron Dax and Basile Baraka, attacking Grado and Mahabali Shera, and aligning themselves with Al Snow. The following week the faction revealed their name as "The Tribunal". Dax and Baraka made their first pay-per-view appearance at Slammiversary against Grado and Shera, where they emerged victorious. On the June 14 episode of Impact!, The Tribunal competed in a 4-Way match for the Impact World Tag Team Championship but failed to win the match. On the August 25 episode of Impact!, Dax competed in a Battle Royal to become #1 contender for Impact World Heavyweight Championship, but failed to win the match.

At Bound for Glory, Dax competed in Gauntlet for Gold Battle Royal which was won by Eli Drake. On the October 6 episode of Impact!, Dax received a title shot at the Impact Grand Championship, but was defeated by Aron Rex. On the October 20 episode of Impact!, The Tribunal got received a shot at the Impact World Tag Team Championship but lost to The Hardys. On the November 10 episode of Impact!, The Tribunal brutally attacked Al Snow, ending their alliance, with Mahabali Shera ultimately rescuing Snow. On December 8 episode of Impact!, The Tribunal competed in their final match for Impact Wrestling where they lost a Double Strap Match to Snow and Shera. On December 10, it was reported that Dax had parted ways with Impact Wrestling.

== Championships and accomplishments ==
- Pro Wrestling Illustrated
  - PWI ranked him #194 of the top 500 singles wrestlers in the PWI 500 in 2016
