= Impact Wrestling Genesis (2017) =

Genesis (2017)
- Promotion: Total Nonstop Action Wrestling
- Date: January 8, 2017 (aired January 26, 2017)
- City: Orlando, Florida
- Venue: Universal Studios
- Tagline: Live and Free on Pop TV

Genesis chronology
← Previous; 2014	Next → 2018

Impact Wrestling special episodes chronology
← Previous; Total Nonstop Deletion	Next → Destination X

Genesis (2017) was a special episode of Impact Wrestling, produced by professional wrestling Total Nonstop Action Wrestling (TNA), which took place on January 8, 2017 at the Universal Studios in Orlando, Florida. It was the tenth event in the Genesis chronology, and aired on January 26 on Pop.

Five matches were contested at the event and every championship in TNA was defended at Genesis. The main event was a thirty-minute Iron Man match, in which Eddie Edwards defended the World Heavyweight Championship against Lashley. Lashley won the match 3-2 to win the title. In other matches on the card, The Broken Hardys retained the World Tag Team Championship, Drew Galloway retained the Grand Championship, Rosemary retained the Knockouts Championship and DJZ retained the X Division Championship. Caleb Konley made his debut as a member of TNA's main roster at the event as one of the participants in the X Division Championship five-way match.

== Storylines ==
Genesis featured professional wrestling matches that involved different wrestlers from pre-existing scripted feuds and storylines. Wrestlers portrayed villains, heroes, or less distinguishable characters in the scripted events that built tension and culminated in a wrestling match or series of matches.

On the October 6 episode of Impact Wrestling, Eddie Edwards defeated Lashley to win the TNA World Heavyweight Championship. Edwards retained the title against Lashley in a rematch on the November 3 episode of Impact Wrestling. On the December 8 episode of Impact Wrestling, Edwards retained the title against Ethan Carter III in a controversial finish with Edwards pinning EC3 and EC3 making Edwards submit at the same time. A title match between Edwards and Lashley ended in a no contest after the two brawled through the crowd into the backstage area at Total Nonstop Deletion. Edwards was challenged by Lashley and EC3 for the title on the January 5, 2017 episode of Impact Wrestling. Edwards accepted the challenge and retained the title against the two in a triple threat match later that night thanks to assistance by his returning tag team partner Davey Richards. The following week, on Impact Wrestling, Lashley defeated EC3 in a last man standing match to become the #1 contender for the title at Genesis. On the January 19 episode of Impact Wrestling, Lashley proposed that his title match against Edwards be a thirty-minute Iron Man match and Edwards accepted his proposal.

On the November 10 episode of Impact Wrestling, the Knockouts Champion Gail Kim praised Jade on her abilities and touted her as the future of the Knockouts division but was attacked by Rosemary. The attack forced Kim to vacate the title on the November 17 episode of Impact Wrestling. Rosemary defeated Jade for the vacant title in a six sides of steel cage match on the December 1 episode of Impact Wrestling. On the January 12 episode of Impact Wrestling, Rosemary berated the Knockouts division and challenged Jade to a Monster's Ball match for the title which Jade accepted and proceeded to attack Rosemary, making the match official for Genesis.

On the January 19 episode of Impact Wrestling, Drew Galloway defeated Moose via split decision to win the Impact Grand Championship. This set up a rematch between the two for Grand Championship at Genesis.

At Bound for Glory, The Broken Hardys (Broken Matt and Brother Nero) defeated Decay (Abyss and Crazzy Steve) in a The Great War to win the TNA World Tag Team Championship. On the November 3 episode of Impact Wrestling, Death Crew Council attacked the Hardys which resulted in a brawl between both teams. Hardys retained the tag team titles against DCC on the December 1 episode of Impact Wrestling. On the January 5 episode of Impact Wrestling, DCC attacked Decay after their win over The Helms Dynasty. On the January 12 episode of Impact Wrestling, Bram explained his motive of joining DCC was to gain revenge on Decay who had abducted him on the August 4 episode of Impact Wrestling. Later that night, Decay defeated DCC via disqualification after James Storm interfered in the match. This set up a three-way match between Broken Hardys, Decay and DCC for the World Tag Team Championship at Genesis.

== Event ==
=== Preliminary matches ===
In the opening match, The Broken Hardys (Broken Matt and Brother Nero) defended the World Tag Team Championship against DCC (Bram and Kingston) and Decay (Abyss and Crazzy Steve) in a three-way match. Steve spit mist into Kingston's face allowing Matt to deliver a Twist of Fate to Steve to retain the titles.

Next, Drew Galloway issued an open challenge putting his Impact Grand Championship on the line. Moose accepted the challenge. Moose was awarded the win in the round one by suplexing Galloway outside the ring and powerbombing him on the apron. Near the end of the match, Galloway hit low blows to Moose as Moose was about to nail a Game Changer to Galloway and then Galloway followed with a Future Shock to Moose to retain the title.

Near, Rosemary defended the Knockouts Championship against Jade in a Monster's Ball match. Rosemary executed a superplex on Jade through a table to retain the title. After the match, Rosemary spit mist on Gail Kim, who came for Jade's aid.

The penultimate match was a five-way match in which DJZ defended the X Division Championship against Andrew Everett, Marshe Rockett, Trevor Lee and the debuting Caleb Konley. DJZ executed a ZDT on Konley for the win. Lee and Gregory Helms attacked DJZ after the match.

=== Main event match ===
The main event was an Iron Man match in which Eddie Edwards defended the World Heavyweight Championship against Lashley. Lashley scored the first fall by executing a spear on Edwards. Lashley powerbombed Edwards on the ramp, which led to Edwards getting counted out and Lashley taking the lead with the second fall. Edwards rolled up Lashley by shoving him into an exposed turnbuckle for the third fall. Edwards would then nail a Boston Knee Party to Lashley to score the fourth fall and even the score with 2-2. Lashley applied an anaconda vice on Edwards to take the lead with 3-2. The time limit expired with Lashley winning the match and winning the TNA World Heavyweight Championship.

== Reception ==
Genesis drew a total viewership of 307,000 viewers with a rating of 0.07, lower than the previous week's episode of Impact Wrestling which aired on January 19 and drew a total viewership of 310,000. It was lower than the previous Genesis episodes in 2014, with the January 16, 2014 episode drawing 1,316 million viewers and 1.08 rating and the January 23, 2014 episode drawing 1,55 million viewers and 1.21 rating.

Larry Csonka of 411Mania rated Genesis 7.8 and considered it "a good and strong rebound show" praising the Knockouts Championship and the World Heavyweight Championship matches with the event being "an overall fun and easy two hours to watch".

== Aftermath ==
The following week's episode of Impact Wrestling was dubbed "Open Fight Night" where wrestlers who had won the Race for the Case on the January 19 episode of Impact Wrestling would be cashing in their briefcases for their desired matches. Brother Nero cashed in his case for a World Heavyweight Championship match against Lashley, which Lashley retained. Eddie Edwards invoked his rematch clause against Lashley for the following week's episode of Impact Wrestling, where Lashley retained the title.

On the February 2 episode of Impact Wrestling, Bram cashed in his Race for the Case briefcase as Death Crew Council took on Decay in a falls count anywhere match, which DCC won.

On the February 2 episode of Impact Wrestling, Trevor Lee cashed in his Race for the Case against DJZ for the X Division Championship in a ladder match, which Lee won with the assistance of Gregory Helms.

The feud between Rosemary and Jade continued over the Knockouts Championship as Rosemary retained the title against Jade in a Last Knockout Standing match on the March 2 episode of Impact Wrestling.

Moose continued to pursue the Grand Championship against Drew Galloway until he received his rematch for the title on the March 2 episode of Impact Wrestling, which Moose won to regain the title.

== Results ==
No.	Results	Stipulations	Times
1	The Broken Hardys (Broken Matt and Brother Nero) (c) defeated DCC (Bram and Kingston) (with James Storm) and Decay (Abyss and Crazzy Steve) (with Rosemary)	Three-way match for the TNA World Tag Team Championship	07:02
2	Drew Galloway (c) defeated Moose	Singles match for the Impact Grand Championship	06:46
3	Rosemary (c) defeated Jade	Monster's Ball match for the TNA Knockouts Championship	09:25
4	DJZ (c) defeated Andrew Everett, Caleb Konley, Marshe Rockett and Trevor Lee	Five-way match for the TNA X Division Championship	04:21
5	Lashley defeated Eddie Edwards (c) (3–2)	30-minute Iron Man match for the TNA World Heavyweight Championship	30:00
(c) / – the champion(s) heading into the match

=== Iron Man match ===
Score	Fall	Method	Time
1-0	Lashley	Pinfall	8:32
2-0	Lashley	Countout	14:42
2-1	Eddie Edwards	Pinfall	21:20
2-2	Eddie Edwards	Pinfall	24:42
3-2	Lashley	Submission	26:32

== See also ==
- 2017 in professional wrestling
- List of Impact! special episodes
