= Impact One Night Only (2017) =

Impact Wrestling/Total Nonstop Action Wrestling's One Night Only events during 2017

One Night Only is a series of professional wrestling events held by Impact Wrestling (formerly known as Total Nonstop Action (TNA) Wrestling, and briefly rebranded to Global Force Wrestling) in 2017.

== One Night Only: Live! ==
One Night Only: Live!
- Promotion: Total Nonstop Action Wrestling
- Date: January 6, 2017
- City: Orlando, Florida
- Venue: Impact Zone
- Attendance: 1,100

One Night Only chronology
← Previous; December 2016	Next → Joker's Wild 2017

One Night Only: Live! was a professional wrestling pay-per-view (PPV) event produced by Total Nonstop Action Wrestling (TNA). It took place on January 6, 2017, at the Impact Zone in Universal Studios in Orlando, Florida.

No.	Results	Stipulations	Times
1	Lashley defeated Davey Richards	Singles match	14:40
2	DJZ (c) defeated Andrew Everett, Braxton Sutter and Trevor Lee	Four-way Elimination match for the TNA X Division Championship	12:22
3	Bram defeated Robbie E	Singles match	07:57
4	Moose defeated Mike Bennett (with Maria Kanellis-Bennett)	No Holds Barred match	18:00
5	Mahabali Shera defeated Marshe Rockett	Singles match	06:00
6	Rosemary (c) defeated Sienna	Singles match for the TNA Knockouts Championship	08:56
7	James Storm (with Bram and Kingston) defeated Jessie Godderz	Singles match	10:20
8	The Broken Hardys ("Broken" Matt Hardy and Jeff Hardy) (c) defeated Eli Drake and Tyrus	Tag team match for the TNA World Tag Team Championship	12:35
9	Eddie Edwards (c) defeated Ethan Carter III	Singles match for the TNA World Heavyweight Championship	15:45
(c) / – the champion(s) heading into the match

TNA X Division Championship match

Eliminated	Wrestler	Eliminated by	Method of elimination	Time
1	Andrew Everett	DJZ	Pinned with a roll-up	04:00
2	Braxton Sutter	Trevor Lee	Pinned with a roll-up	08:55
3	Trevor Lee	DJZ	Pinned after the ZDT (Rolling Thunder into a jumping DDT)	12:22
4	DJZ	—	Winner	12:22

== Joker's Wild 2017 ==
Joker's Wild 2017
- Promotion: Total Nonstop Action Wrestling
- Date: January 7, 2017 (aired February 10, 2017)
- City: Orlando, Florida
- Venue: Impact Zone

One Night Only chronology
← Previous; One Night Only: Live!	Next → Rivals 2017

Joker's Wild chronology
← Previous; 2016	Next → Final

One Night Only: Joker's Wild 2017 was a professional wrestling pay-per-view (PPV) event produced by Total Nonstop Action Wrestling (TNA). The tournament consists of tag team matches in which the partners are randomly drawn in a lottery, with the winning teams advancing to the main event battle royal, for a grand prize of $100,000. It aired on February 10, 2017, from the Impact Zone in Universal Studios in Orlando, Florida.

No.	Results	Stipulations	Times
1	Moose and Davey Richards defeated "Broken" Matt Hardy and Trevor Lee	Tag team match to qualify for the Gauntlet Battle Royal match later that night	10:20
2	Aron Rex and Spud defeated Bad Bones and Jessie Godderz	Tag team match to qualify for the Gauntlet Battle Royal match later that night	10:00
3	DCC (Bram and Kingston) defeated Robbie E and Mahabali Shera	Tag team match to qualify for the Gauntlet Battle Royal match later that night	06:55
4	Mike Bennett (with Maria Kanellis-Bennett) and Braxton Sutter defeated Tyrus and Crazzy Steve	Tag team match to qualify for the Gauntlet Battle Royal match later that night	09:40
5	Jeff Hardy and DJZ defeated Eli Drake and Paredyse	Tag team match to qualify for the Gauntlet Battle Royal match later that night	0:57
6	Jade and Sienna defeated Laurel Van Ness and Allie	Knockouts tag team match to qualify for the Gauntlet Battle Royal match later that night	08:10
7	Eddie Edwards and Caleb Konley defeated Andrew Everett and Marshe Rockett	Tag team match to qualify for the Gauntlet Battle Royal match later that night	08:18
8	Moose won the $100,000 prize by last eliminating Bram	14-person intergender Joker's Wild gauntlet battle royal	31:11

Gauntlet Battle Royal

Draw	Entrant	Elimination Order	Eliminated by
1	Davey Richards	9	Jeff Hardy
2	DJZ	2	Davey Richards
3	Caleb Konley	1	Davey Richards
4	Bram	13	Moose
5	Kingston	6	Moose
6	Spud	3	Jade and Sienna
7	Eddie Edwards	8	Davey Richards
8	Jade	4	Aron Rex
9	Sienna	5	Aron Rex
10	Aron Rex	7	Himself
11	Moose	-	Winner
12	Mike Bennett	12	Moose
13	Braxton Sutter	10	Bram
14	Jeff Hardy	11	Mike Bennett

== Rivals 2017 ==
Rivals 2017
- Promotion: Total Nonstop Action Wrestling
- Date: January 8, 2017 (aired March 17, 2017)
- City: Orlando, Florida
- Venue: Impact Zone

One Night Only chronology
← Previous; Joker's Wild 2017	Next → Victory Road – Knockouts Knockdown

Rivals chronology
← Previous; 2016	Next → Final

One Night Only: Rivals 2017 was a professional wrestling pay-per-view (PPV) event produced by Total Nonstop Action Wrestling (TNA). The event includes wrestlers with current and past rivalries facing-off with one another in matches. The event featured the return of Angelina Love.

Rivals 2017 would be the last PPV event produced under the TNA Wrestling brand until Hard to Kill in 2024.

No.	Results	Stipulations	Times
1	DJZ defeated Trevor Lee	Singles match	11:25
2	Braxton Sutter defeated Spud	Singles match	09:00
3	James Storm defeated Mahabali Shera	Singles match	06:07
4	Aron Rex (with Spud) defeated Jessie Godderz	Singles match	09:14
5	Decay (Abyss and Crazzy Steve) (with Rosemary) defeated DCC (Bram and Kingston)	Tag team match	08:26
6	Angelina Love defeated Madison Rayne	Singles match	07:05
7	"Broken" Matt Hardy defeated Drew Galloway	Singles match	11:21
8	Moose defeated Mike Bennett (with Maria Kanellis-Bennett)	Singles match	07:05
9	Lashley defeated Jeff Hardy	Singles match	10:37

== Victory Road – Knockouts Knockdown ==
Victory Road – Knockouts Knockdown
- Promotion: Impact Wrestling
- Date: March 3–4, 2017 (aired April 14, 2017)
- City: Orlando, Florida
- Venue: Impact Zone
- Tagline: The Next Knockout

One Night Only chronology
← Previous; Rivals 2017	Next → Turning Point 2017

Knockouts Knockdown chronology
← Previous; 2016	Next → 2021

One Night Only: Victory Road – Knockouts Knockdown was a professional wrestling pay-per-view (PPV) event produced by Impact Wrestling, where a series of matches are held, featuring eight Knockouts going up against eight independent wrestlers. The winner of these matches would advance to a four-on-four tag team match at the end of the night, with the last Knockout standing receiving an Impact Wrestling contract. Matches were filmed on March 3–4, 2017, from the Impact Zone in Universal Studios in Orlando, Florida.

No.	Results	Stipulations	Times
1	Angelina Love (with Davey Richards) defeated Kayci Quinn	Singles match	10:38
2	Leva Bates defeated Allie	Singles match	12:12
3	Diamante (with Konnan and Homicide) defeated ACR	Singles match	10:24
4	Rosemary (with Crazzy Steve) defeated MJ Jenkins	Singles match	08:05
5	Alisha Edwards defeated Sienna	Singles match	10:33
6	Santana Garrett defeated Brandi Rhodes	Singles match	11:35
7	ODB defeated Rebel	Singles match	09:15
8	Laurel Van Ness defeated Rachael Ellering	Singles match	10:45
9	Leva Bates, Alisha Edwards, Santana Garrett, and ODB defeated Laurel Van Ness, Rosemary, Angelina Love, and Diamanté	Four-on-Four tag team match	11:08

== Turning Point 2017 ==
Turning Point 2017
- Promotion: Impact Wrestling
- Date: April 22, 2017 (aired May 11, 2017)
- City: Orlando, Florida
- Venue: Impact Zone

One Night Only chronology
← Previous; Victory Road - Knockouts Knockdown	Next → No Surrender 2017

One Night Only: Turning Point 2017 was a professional wrestling pay-per-view (PPV) event produced by Impact Wrestling, matches were filmed on April 22, 2017, from the Impact Zone in Universal Studios in Orlando, Florida.

No.	Results	Stipulations	Times
1	Veterans of War (Mayweather and Wilcox) defeated Mario Bokara and Fallah Bahh	Tag team match	10:00
2	Laurel Van Ness (with Kongo Kong) defeated Ava Storie	Singles match	05:17
3	Mahabali Shera defeated Marshe Rockett	Singles match	04:30
4	Matt Morgan defeated KM (with Sienna)	Singles match	07:34
5	Davey Richards (with Angelina Love) defeated Suicide	Singles match	14:00
6	A.J. Styles (c) defeated Christopher Daniels and Samoa Joe	Three-way match for the TNA World Heavyweight Championship (Turning Point (2009) match)	21:50
7	Rosemary defeated Sienna (with KM)	Singles match	06:00
8	Eddie Edwards defeated Eli Drake	Singles match	12:25
9	Lashley (c) defeated Moose	Singles match for the Impact Wrestling World Heavyweight Championship	20:11
(c) / – the champion(s) heading into the match

== No Surrender 2017 ==
No Surrender 2017
- Promotion: Impact Wrestling
- Date: April 23, 2017 (aired June 16, 2017)
- City: Orlando, Florida
- Venue: Impact Zone

One Night Only chronology
← Previous; Turning Point 2017	Next → GFW Amped Anthology – Part 1

One Night Only: No Surrender 2017 was a professional wrestling pay-per-view (PPV) event produced by Impact Wrestling, matches were filmed on April 23, 2017, from the Impact Zone in Universal Studios in Orlando, Florida.

No.	Results	Stipulations	Times
1	Garza Jr. & Laredo Kid defeated Idris Abraham and Hakim Zane	Tag team match	08:45
2	Mahabali Shera defeated Fallah Bahh	Singles match	05:20
3	Trevor Lee (with Gregory Shane Helms) defeated Suicide	Singles match	13:05
4	Braxton Sutter (with Allie) defeated KM (with Sienna)	Singles match	11:50
5	Jeff Hardy vs. Kurt Angle ended in a time limit draw	Semi-Finals of the TNA World Heavyweight Championship Tournament; If Angle had lost, he would have retired from wrestling (No Surrender (2010) match)	30:05
6	Dezmond Xavier defeated Mario Bokara	Singles match	09:30
7	Rosemary defeated Laurel Van Ness (with Sienna)	Singles match	07:30
8	Eli Drake (with Chris Adonis) defeated James Storm	Singles match	08:35
9	James Storm defeated Eli Drake	Singles match	00:20
10	Lashley (c) defeated Eddie Edwards	Singles match for the Impact Wrestling World Heavyweight Championship	17:50
(c) / – the champion(s) heading into the match
