= Decay (professional wrestling) =

Professional wrestling stable

Statistics
- Members: Abyss; Crazzy Steve; Black Taurus; Rosemary/Courtney Rush; Havok/Jessicka
- Name: Decay
- Billed heights: Abyss: 6 ft 8 in (2.03 m); Steve: 5 ft 10 in (1.78 m); Taurus: 5 ft 10 in (1.78 m); Rosemary: 5 ft 8 in (1.73 m); Havok: 6 ft 0 in (1.83 m)
- Combined billed weight: 1,164 lb (528 kg)
- Debut: January 26, 2016
- Years active: 2016–2017; 2018; 2021–2023; 2024

Decay was a professional wrestling stable that performed in Total Nonstop Action Wrestling (TNA).

They made their debut on January 26, 2016, as the trio of Abyss, Crazzy Steve and Rosemary. As members of the stable, Abyss and Crazzy Steve won the TNA World Tag Team Championship, while Rosemary won the TNA Knockouts Championship. In early 2021, Decay reunited as a duo without Abyss who had left the company, adding Black Taurus to the group on February 9 of that year, and Havok on July 15. Rosemary and Havok would go on to win the Impact Knockouts Tag Team Championship along with Taya Valkyrie as The Death Dollz.

== History ==
=== Total Nonstop Action Wrestling (2016–2017) ===
==== Formation (2016) ====
On the January 18, 2016 episode of Impact Wrestling, Crazzy Steve and Abyss attacked TNA World Tag Team Champions The Wolves during a backstage promo. The next week on January 26, Rosemary would make her presence known leading to a match between Abyss, Crazzy Steve and The Wolves. The match would end in a disqualification as the trio continued to assault The Wolves and steal their titles, thus forming a new stable called Decay. On the February 2 episode of Impact Wrestling, Decay with Eric Young and Bram defeated The Wolves and Beer Money in a Hardcore War match. On the February 9 episode of Impact Wrestling, Decay were defeated by Beer Money by disqualification. On the March 16 episode of Impact Wrestling, Decay challenged The Wolves in a Monster's Ball match for TNA World Tag Team Championships in a losing effort. On the Maximum Impact 8 tour, Decay would be confronted by Jimmy Havoc, who implied a past relationship with Rosemary and attempted to get her back. Abyss would go on to defeat Havoc in a No Disqualification match on the March 1 episode of Impact Wrestling.

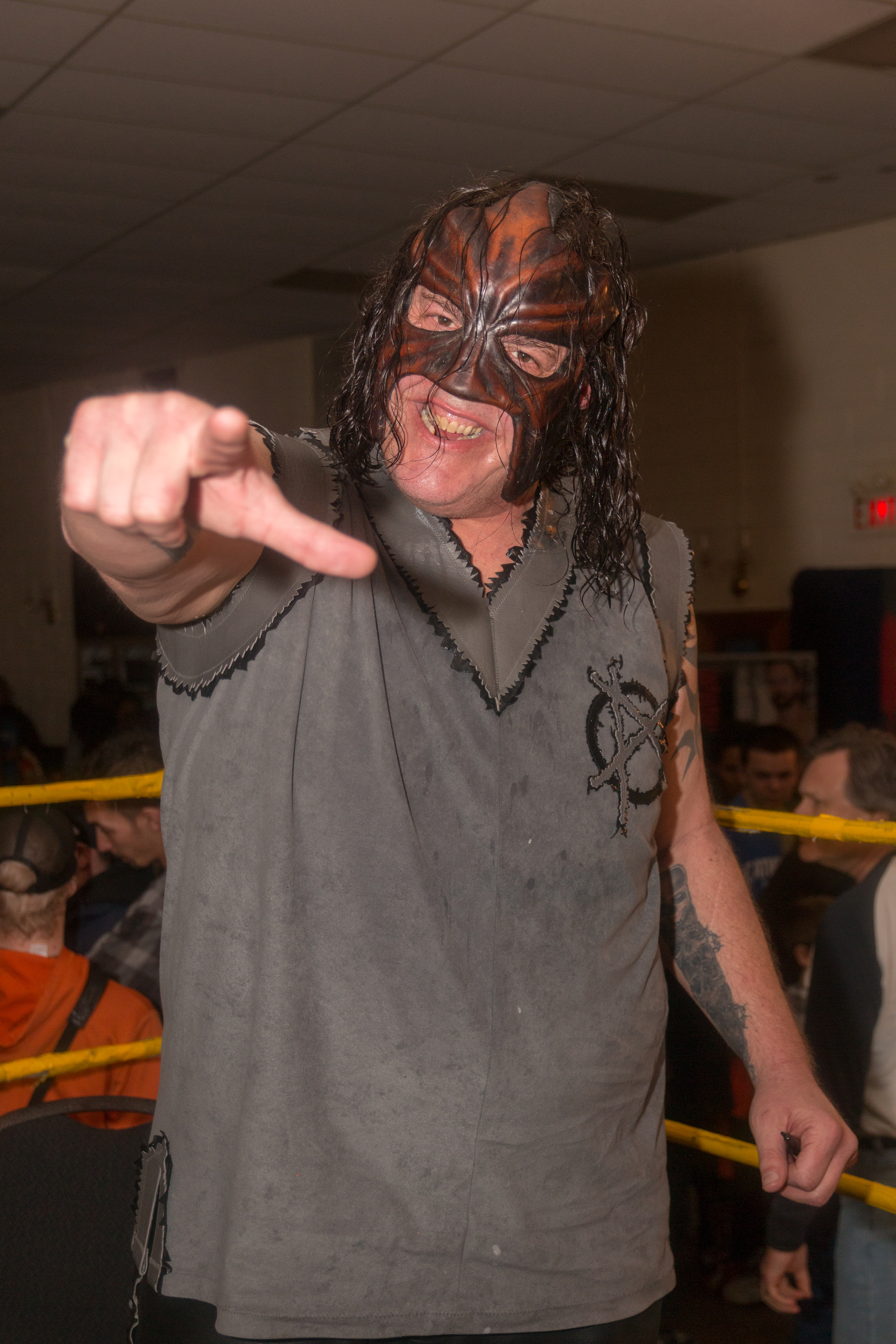
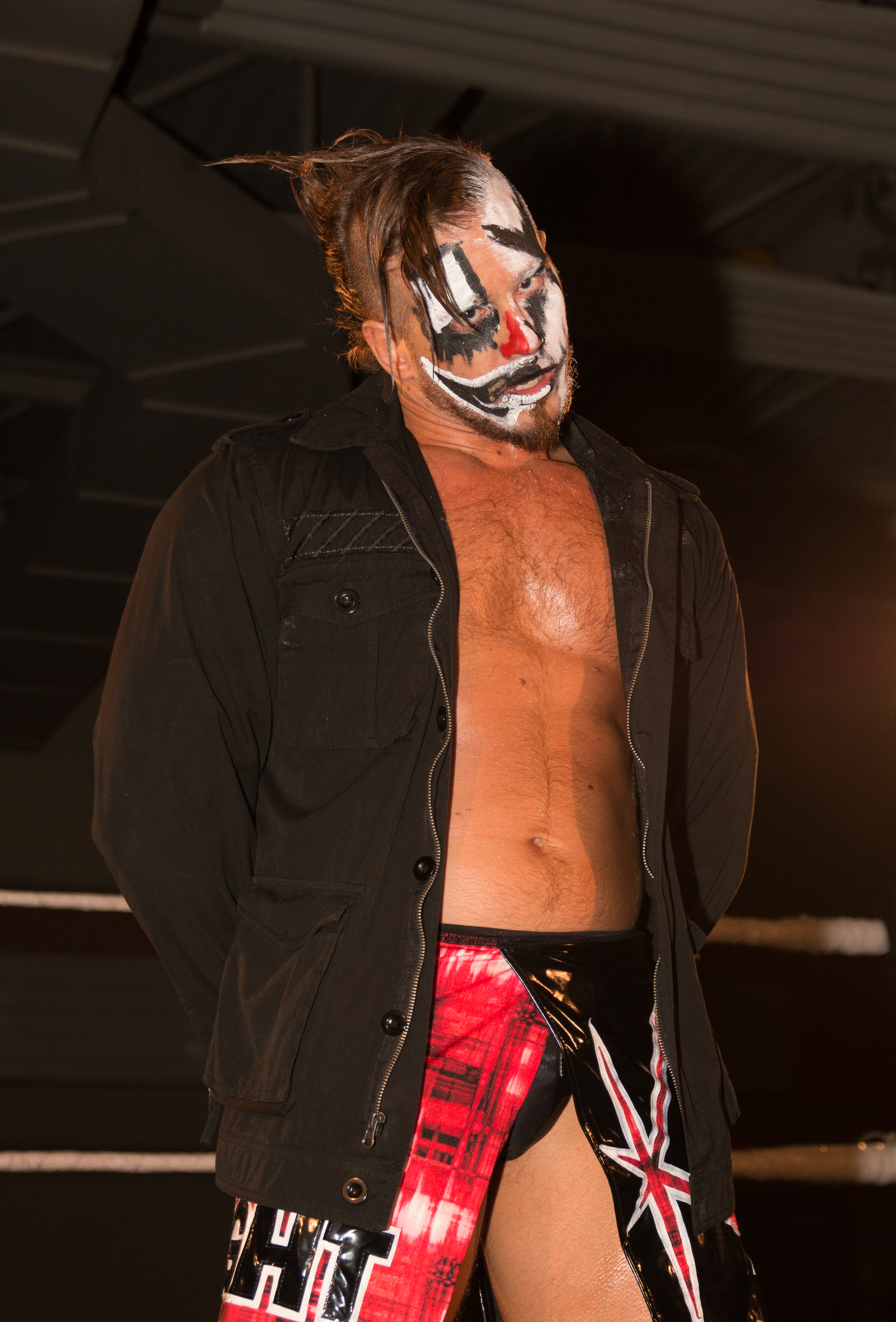
The first two male members of the group Abyss and Crazzy Steve.

==== World Tag Team Champions (2016–2017) ====
On the April 12, Decay challenged Beer Money for the TNA World Tag Team Championships, in a match also involving Eric Young and Bram and The BroMans, in a losing effort. At Sacrifice, Decay defeated Beer Money in a Valley of Shadow match to win the TNA World Tag Team Championships after coercing Beer Money into a match by kidnapping Gail Kim. On the May 10 episode of Impact Wrestling, Decay successfully retained their titles against Jeff Hardy and James Storm. On the May 31 episode of Impact Wrestling, Decay were defeated by Drew Galloway in a handicap match. Decay would retain their titles against The BroMans at Slammiversary. On the Impact Gold Rush special episode, Decay retained their titles against The BroMans, Grado and Mahabali Shera and The Tribunal in a four-way match. After being defeated by The BroMans and Raquel on the July 5 episode of Impact, they successfully retained their titles against The BroMans in a Monster's Ball match on the July 28 episode of Impact Wrestling. In July, Rosemary started a relationship with Bram, attempting to court him into joining The Decay. Eventually, Rosemary would turn on Bram and have Crazzy Steve and Abyss attack and abduct Bram.

After "Broken" Matt Hardy and Brother Nero won a tag-team number one contenders match for the TNA World Tag Team Championship against Decay at Bound for Glory, Decay would go on to declare their intention of taking Matt Hardy's son, King Maxel from his family. On the September 1 episode of Impact Wrestling, Decay received an invitation from the Broken Hardys, to go to the Hardy Compound for a plotted brawl dubbed, "Delete or Decay." At Bound for Glory, Decay lost the titles against The Hardys. Decay would have their rematch the following episode of Impact Wrestling taking on the Hardys in a "Wolf Creek cage match," in a losing effort.

On the October 27 episode of Impact Wrestling, Decay took part at Team X Gold, but were defeated by "Go for Broke" (DJZ, Mandrews and Braxton Sutter). The following week, they were defeated once again by Go for Broke in a match who also included The Helms Dynasty (Trevor Lee and Andrew Everett) and Marshe Rockett. On the November 24 episode of Impact Wrestling, they were defeated by Go for Broke in a match who also included The Helms Dynasty and Marshe Rockett in three corners elimination match, and lose the Team X Gold.

On the December 15 episode of Impact Wrestling dubbed "Total Nonstop Deletion", Decay was one of the many tag teams to answer The Broken Hardys open invitational known as Tag Team Apocalypto, losing to The Broken Hardys as the last eliminated tag team.

After defeating The Helms Dynasty on the January 5, 2017 episode of Impact Wrestling, Decay's celebration was cut short by the sudden arrival of the DCC, who ambushed Abyss and Crazzy Steve by smashing beer bottles over their heads, with Bram issuing a threat to Rosemary afterwards. On the January 6 One Night Only: Live PPV, Abyss and Crazzy Steve would ambush the DCC after James Storm's victory over Jessie Godderz, misting Storm and Bram, incapacitating them while Abyss chokeslammed Kingston. On the January 12 episode of Impact Wrestling, the match between Decay and the DCC ended in a double count-out. At Genesis, Decay were defeated by The Broken Hardys in a match who also included the DCC, and failed to win the TNA World Tag Team Championship. On the February 2 episode of Impact Wrestling, The Decay were defeated by the DCC in a Fall Count Anywhere match.

On the February 16 episode of Impact Wrestling, Decay were defeated by Moose and Brandi Rhodes. On the March 23 episode of Impact Wrestling, Decay were quickly defeated by Reno Scum. On the March 30 episode of Impact Wrestling, Decay were defeated by The Latin American Xchange (LAX) in a match who also included Garza Jr. and Laredo Kid and Reno Scum and failed to win the vacant Impact World Tag Team Championship. On the April 13 episode of Impact Wrestling, Decay suffered a second loss against Reno Scum, in a match who also included Garza Jr. and Laredo Kid. On the April 28 episode of Impact Wrestling, Decay were defeated by LAX, in a Street Fight and failed to win the Impact World Tag Team Championship. On April 20, 2017, Steve confirmed that he had departed from the company. After their match, L.A.X. hosted Decay's funeral, disbanding the team.

=== Independent circuit (2017–2018) ===
On October 7, 2017, Abyss and Crazzy Steve unsuccessfully challenged DBA and Malcolm Monroe III for the XICW Tag Team Championship in a steel cage match.

On August 29, 2018, Abyss and Crazzy Steve were reuniting in Ohio Valley Wrestling.

=== Return to Impact Wrestling/TNA (2021–2024) ===
On the January 12, 2021 episode of Impact!, Crazzy Steve prevented Kaleb with a K from interfering in his former ally Rosemary's match against Tenille Dashwood, which allowed Rosemary to win the match, thus marking a reunion of Decay. This led to Decay reuniting at the Hard To Kill pay-per-view and winning against Dashwood and Kaleb in an intergender tag team match. On February 9, Black Taurus was introduced as the newest member of Decay, scoring a quick win over Kaleb that night. Taurus teamed up with Steve and Rosemary for the first time on February 13 at No Surrender as they faced Tenille Dashwood and XXXL (Acey Romero and Larry D) in a winning effort. On March 13, at Sacrifice, Taurus and Steve defeated Reno Scum. On April 10, at Hardcore Justice, Taurus lost a match against Doc Gallows and Rosemary competed in a weapons match to determine a number one contender for the Knockouts Championship, which was won by Dashwood.

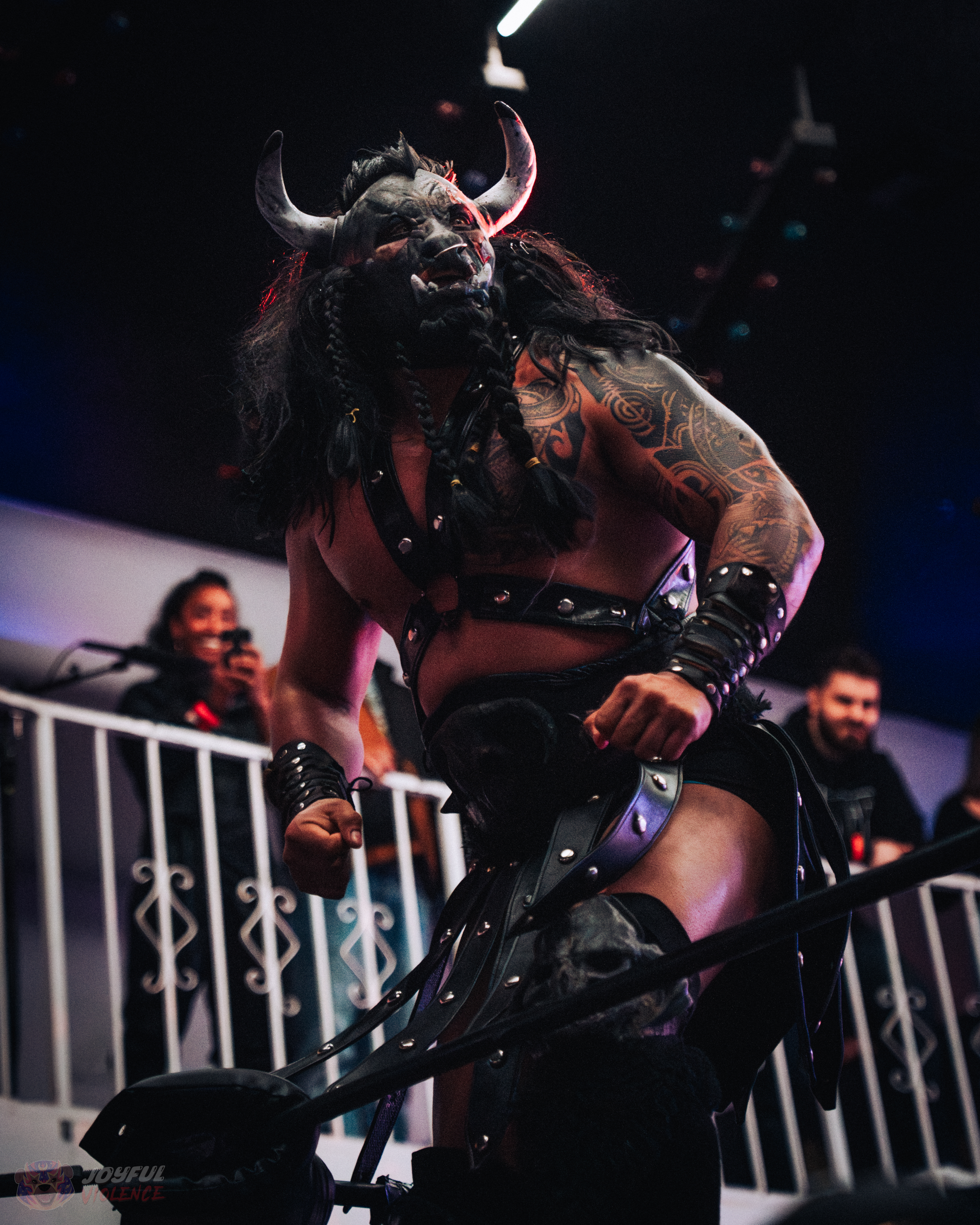
Latest member of the group Black Taurus.

On the Countdown to Rebellion pre-show, Rosemary teamed up with Havok to defeat Kimber Lee and Susan. On May 15, at Under Siege, Taurus was defeated by Brian Myers and Havok lost to Deonna Purrazzo for the Knockouts title. At Against All Odds, Taurus and Steve lost to Violent By Design (Deaner and Rhino) for the World Tag Team Championship, and Rosemary failed to capture the Knockouts title from Purrazzo. On the July 15 episode of Impact!, Havok was inducted into Decay by James Mitchell. Two days later, on the Countdown to Slammiversary pre-show, Havok and Rosemary defeated Fire 'N Flava (Kiera Hogan and Tasha Steelz) to win the Impact Knockouts Tag Team Championship. On July 31, at Homecoming, Taurus fought Josh Alexander for the X Division Championship in a losing effort, and Rosemary and Steve lost to Purrazzo and Matthew Rehwoldt in a tournament final to crown a Homecoming King and Queen.

On August 20, at Emergence, Decay defeated Fallah Bahh, No Way, Savannah Evans and Tasha Steelz in an eight-person tag match. On September 18, at Victory Road, Taurus competed in a five-way scramble match that was won by Laredo Kid, and Havok and Rosemary successfully retained their Knockouts Tag Team Championship against Evans and Steelz. At Knockouts Knockdown, Havok and Rosemary successfully retained their tag titles against The Influence (Madison Rayne and Tenille Dashwood). At Bound for Glory, they lost the titles to The IInspiration (Cassie Lee and Jessica McKay).

On the August 31, 2023 episode of Impact!, Steve turn on Taurus, leading to a match at Victory Road which Steve would win. Black Taurus' profile would be removed from the IMPACT roster page in January 2024. On January 13, at Hard To Kill, Havok and Rosemary revived the Decay name and won the TNA Knockouts World Tag Team Championship, defeating MK Ultra (Killer Kelly and Masha Slamovich), only to lose it back to them a month later.

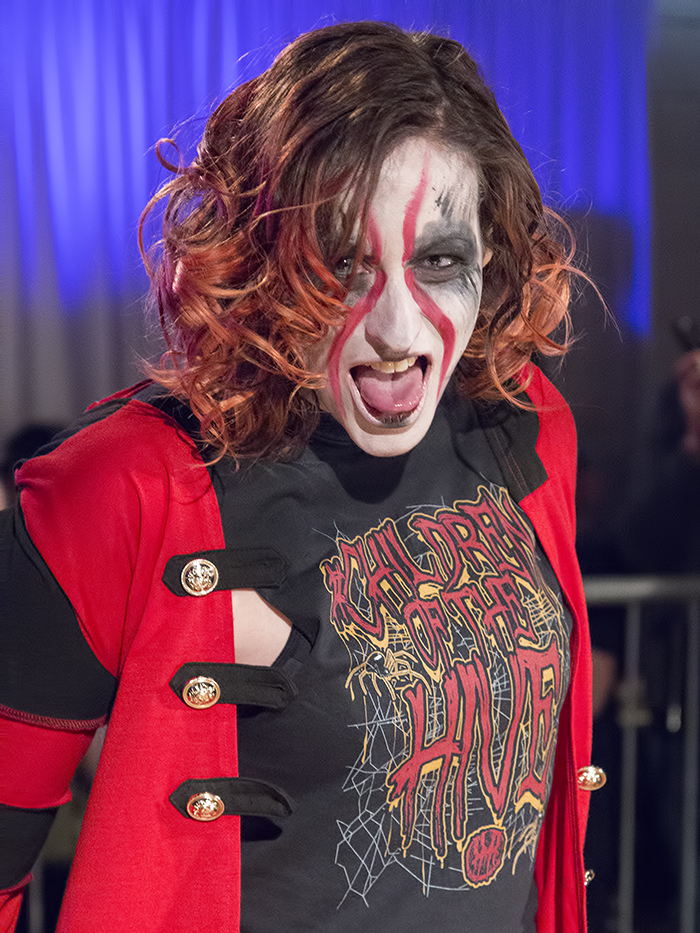
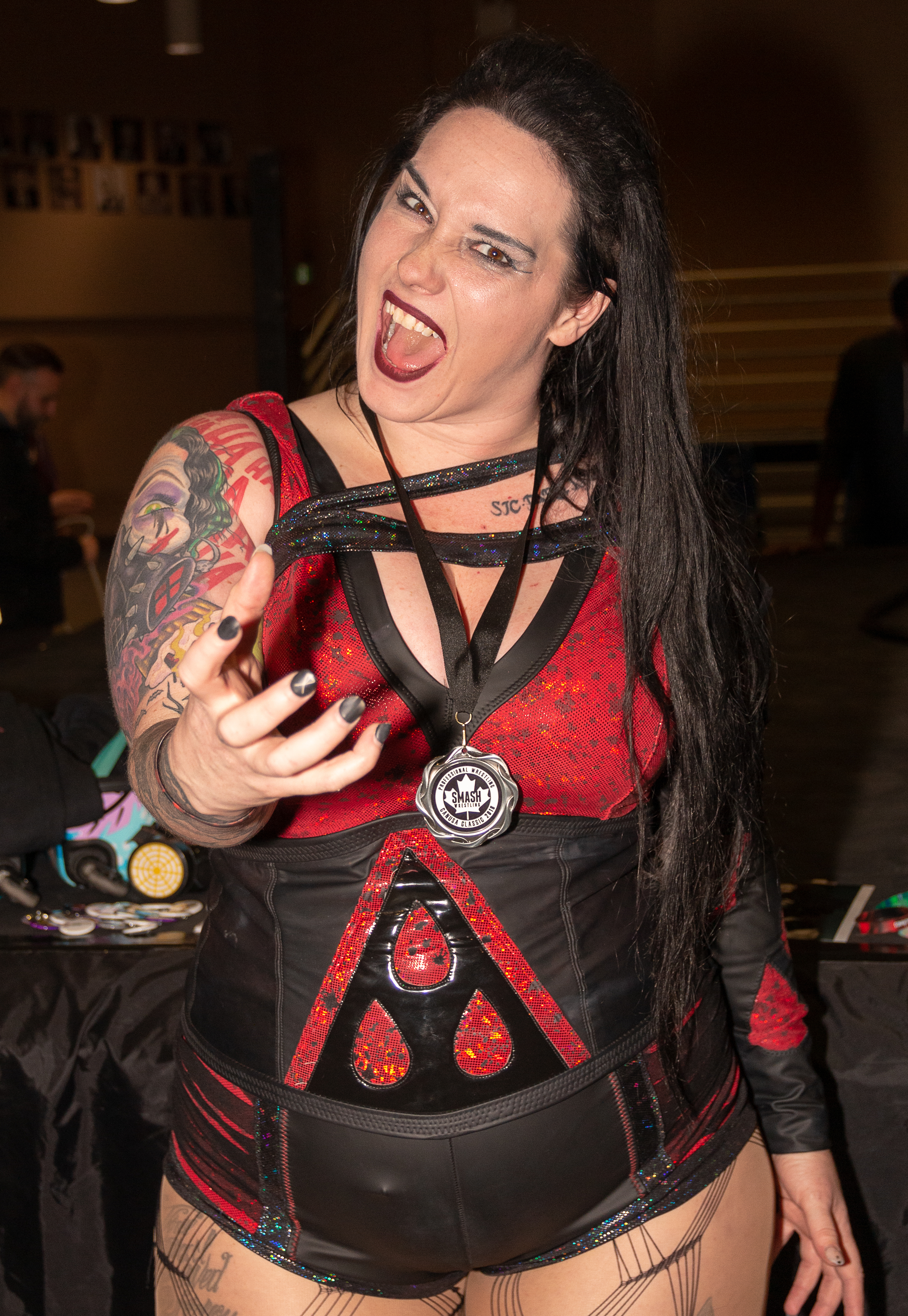
The female proportion of the group, original female member Rosemary, and second female member Jessicka Havok, also known as The Death Dollz.

=== Lucha Libre AAA Worldwide (2024) ===
On August 8, 2024, Crazzy Steve and Havok made their debut in Verano de Escandalo earning the opportunity for the AAA World Mixed Tag Team Championship after defeating a Aero Star and Estrellita and Negro Casas and Dalys. On October 6 at Héroes Inmortales, they managed to win the titles after defeating Abismo Negro Jr. and Flammer, being their first AAA championship as a team.

== Members ==
*	Founding members

Member	Joined	Final appearance
Abyss	January 26, 2016*	April 20, 2017
Crazzy Steve	January 26, 2016*; January 12, 2021; August 2, 2024	April 20, 2017; August 31, 2023; December 8, 2024
Black Taurus	February 9, 2021	August 31, 2023
Rosemary/Courtney Rush	January 26, 2016*; January 12, 2021; January 13, 2024	April 20, 2017; August 31, 2023; June 15, 2024
Havok/Jessicka	July 15, 2021; January 13, 2024; August 2, 2024	August 31, 2023; June 15, 2024; December 8, 2024

== Sub-groups ==
=== Former ===
Affiliate	Members	Tenure	Type
The Death Dollz	Jessicka; Rosemary/Courtney Rush; Taya Valkyrie	2022–2023	Tag team stable

== Championships and accomplishments ==
- Lucha Libre AAA Worldwide
  - AAA World Mixed Tag Team Championship (1 time) – Havok and Crazzy Steve
- Total Nonstop Action Wrestling / Impact Wrestling
  - TNA World Tag Team Championship (1 time) – Abyss and Crazzy Steve
  - TNA Knockouts Championship (1 time) – Rosemary
  - Impact/TNA Knockouts World Tag Team Championship (4 times) – Rosemary and Havok (2), Rosemary and Taya Valkyrie (1), Rosemary, Jessicka (Note: Jessicka won her previous two Knockouts tag titles under the ring name Havok) and Valkyrie (1)
  - Impact Year End Awards (1 time)
    - Knockouts Tag Team of the Year (2022) – Jessicka, Rosemary, and Valkyrie
