= Total Nonstop Deletion =

2016 professional wrestling event

- Promotional image featuring The Broken Hardys
- Promotion: Total Nonstop Action Wrestling
- Date: December 15, 2016
- City: Cameron, North Carolina
- Venue: Dome of Deletion; Hardy Compound
- Attendance: c. 50

Impact Wrestling special episodes chronology
← Previous; Road to Glory	Next → Genesis

Total Nonstop Deletion was a professional wrestling special event episode of Impact Wrestling produced by Total Nonstop Action Wrestling. It took place on December 15, 2016, at the Hardy Compound in Cameron, North Carolina. The event included special appearances by The Rock 'n' Roll Express, Road Warrior Animal, ODB, Disco Inferno, Swoggle and The Bravado Brothers among other independent wrestling tag teams from CWF Mid-Atlantic.

== Background ==
On October 9, during an Impact Wrestling taping, Matt Hardy first announced that TNA would be holding an entire episode of Impact Wrestling from his home in Cameron, North Carolina, entitled "Total Nonstop Deletion." The center piece of the episode was revealed to be an open tag team invitational, Hardy would go on to invite then WWE Raw Tag Team Champions The New Day as well as ROH Tag Team Champions and IWGP Junior Heavyweight Tag Team Champions The Young Bucks, offering to appear on both ROH and WWE programming in exchange.

Other on-screen personnel
Commentator	Josh Mathews
Commentator	Jeremy Borash

Filming, however, was postponed due to the legal issues between then TNA President Billy Corgan and the company. Corgan lost his injunction on TNA, which had prevented filming of any kind on October 31, allowing filming for Total Nonstop Deletion to commence later that week. During the buildup for Total Nonstop Deletion, Matt Hardy made a surprise appearance at Ring of Honor's Final Battle, issuing a challenge to The Young Bucks.

== Results ==
No.	Results	Stipulations	Times
1	King Maxel (w/ Rebecca Hardy) defeated Rockstar Spud	No disqualification match	00:17
2	Sienna defeated ODB	Singles match to determine the #1 Contender for the TNA Knockouts Championship	03:55
3	Itchweeed defeated Chet Sterling	Singles match	04:00
4	Eddie Edwards (c) vs. Lashley ended in a no contest	Singles match for the TNA World Heavyweight Championship	07:05
5	The Broken Hardys ("Broken" Matt Hardy & Brother Nero) (c) last defeated Decay (Abyss and Crazzy Steve)	Tag Team Apocalypto for the TNA World Tag Team Championship	44:00
(c) / – the champion(s) heading into the match

=== Tag Team Apocalypto ===
Entrant No.	Team	Eliminated by	Eliminated
1	The Broken Hardys ("Broken" Matt Hardy & Brother Nero)	—	Winners
2	Helms Dynasty (Trevor Lee & Andrew Everett)	"Broken" Matt Hardy and The Hurricane	9
3	The Rock 'n' Roll Express (Ricky Morton & Robert Gibson)	The Broken Hardys	5
4	Decay (Abyss & Crazzy Steve)	The Broken Hardys	10
5	The Bruiserweights (John Skyler & Corey Hollis)	Decay	1
6	The Ugly Ducklings (Colby Corino, Lance Lude & Rob Killjoy)	Decay	2
7	Showtime (The Dirty Daddy & Snooty Fox)	Decay	3
8	Aaron Biggs and Mecha Mercenary	Decay	4
9	The Bravado Brothers (Harlem Bravado & Lancelot Bravado)	Rockstar Spud and Swoggle	6
10	Rockstar Spud and Swoggle	The Helms Dynasty	7
11	Death Crew Council (James Storm and an unidentified man)	Decay	8

== Aftermath ==
The Hardy Compound was once again used for a match in March 2018. "Woken" Matt Hardy, as he later became known in WWE, took on Bray Wyatt in a pre-taped episode called "The Ultimate Deletion" that aired on Raw.
