= Crazzy Steve =

Canadian professional wrestler

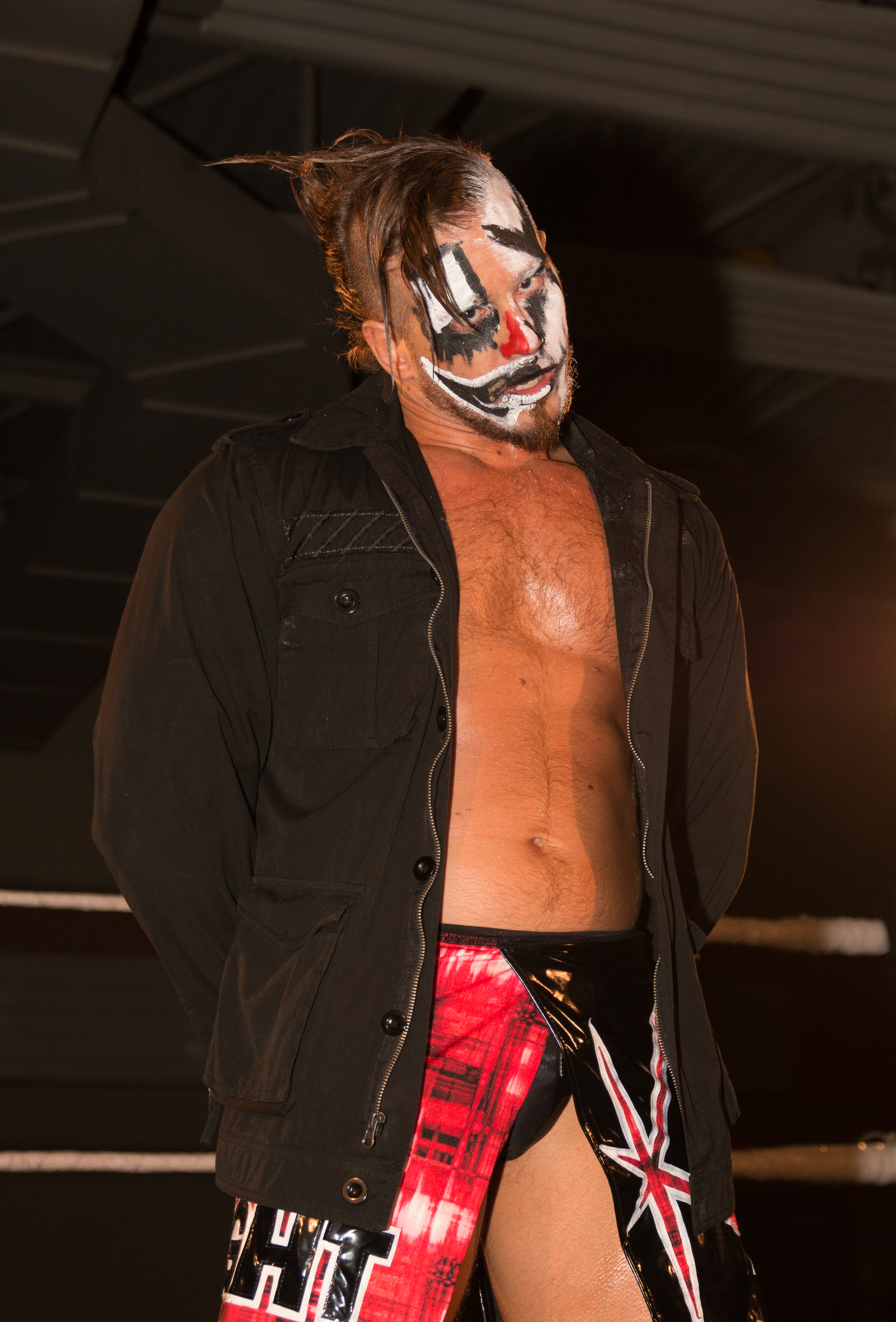
- Steve in 2015

Personal information
- Born: Steven Scott; March 4, 1984 (age 42) Angus, Ontario, Canada

Professional wrestling career
- Ring name(s): Crazzy Steve; Steven Scott
- Billed height: 5 ft 10 in (1.78 m)
- Billed weight: 200 lb (91 kg)
- Billed from: The Carnival; Blackhill Sanitarium
- Trained by: Eric Young
- Debut: 2003

Steven Scott (born March 4, 1984) is a Canadian professional wrestler who performs under the ring name Crazzy Steve. He is signed to Total Nonstop Action Wrestling, where he is a former TNA Digital Media Champion and a former TNA World Tag Team Champion. He also currently wrestles on the independent circuit for various other promotions.

== Professional wrestling career ==
=== Independent circuit (2003–2014) ===
Scott competed in the independent circuit, including Great Canadian Wrestling (GCW) where he is a one time GCW Tag Team Champion with Gutter. He also won the Maximum Pro Wrestling's Georgian Bay Heavyweight Championship defeating El Tornado on September 10, 2011. On November 26, 2013, Scott faced Gabriel Saint for the ESW Interstate Championship but failed to win the title.

=== Total Nonstop Action Wrestling / Impact Wrestling (2014–2017) ===
==== The Menagerie (2014–2015) ====
In April 2014, Scott made his debut for Total Nonstop Action Wrestling (TNA) under his Crazzy Steve ring name and became a part of Knux's The Menagerie stable, which also included The Freak and Rebel. On the May 8 episode of Impact Wrestling, The Menagerie made their televised debut with Knux defeating Kazarian in Knux's return match. The following week, Steve fought Kazarian to a no contest after Steve pants'd the referee in his in-ring debut. On June 15, at Slammiversary XII, Steve took part in a 6-way Ladder match for the TNA X Division Championship which was won by Sanada. On the July 17 episode of Impact Wrestling, Steve took part in a Gauntlet Match for the X Division Championship which was won by Austin Aries. On the January 23, 2015, episode of Impact Wrestling, Steve competed in the Feast or Fired match, but failed to retrieve a briefcase. The group disbanded after Knux left TNA on May 19, 2015.

During October and November (taped in July), Steve competed in the new World Title Series tournament as a member of "Group Wildcard", where he finished 4th in the group, failing to win any of the matches that took place the following weeks. At One Night Only: Live!, Steve turned heel when he attacked Tigre Uno after he was eliminated in a match for the X Division Championship.

==== Decay (2016–2017) ====
On the January 26, 2016, episode of Impact Wrestling, Steve, Abyss and Rosemary attacked TNA World Tag Team Champions The Wolves and stole their titles, thus forming a new stable called Decay. On March 19, Decay defeated Beer Money, Inc. to win the TNA World Tag Team Championship, marking Steve's first TNA championship. On the May 3 episode of Impact Wrestling, Rosemary spit green mist into his face before Abyss's match with James Storm, giving him the ability to speak for the first time in TNA. The following week on Impact Wrestling, Decay defeated Jeff Hardy and James Storm to retain the titles. At Slammiversary, Decay retained the titles against The BroMans (Robbie E and Jessie Godderz). On October 2 at Bound for Glory, Decay lost the titles to The Broken Hardys in a match dubbed "The Great War." On the October 6 episode of Impact Wrestling, The Broken Hardys defeated Decay in a Wolf Creek Cage Match. On December 15, during special episode Total Nonstop Deletion, Decay competed in Tag Team Apocalypto where The Hardys retained the titles.

On the January 5, 2017, episode of Impact Wrestling, after defeating The Helms Dynasty, Decay's celebration was cut short by the sudden arrival of the Death Crew Council (DCC), who ambushed Decay by smashing beer bottles over their heads, with Bram issuing a threat to Rosemary afterwards. On January 6, at One Night Only: Live, Decay would ambush DCC after James Storm's victory over Jessie Godderz, misting Storm and Bram, incapacitating them while Abyss chokeslammed Kingston. On the January 12 episode of Impact Wrestling, the match between Decay and DCC ended in a double count-out. On the January 19 episode of Impact Wrestling, Steve competed in a Race for the Case match, but failed to get a case. On the April 27 episode of Impact Wrestling, Decay lost to The Latin American Xchange (Santana and Ortiz), and this would be Steve's last match for the company. On April 20, 2017, Scott announced his departure from Impact Wrestling.

=== Return to independent circuit (2017–2020) ===
On June 17, 2017, WWE reported that Steve was attending a tryout at their Performance Center. He was not signed, however. Following his departure from Impact, Steve announced that would be competing for various promotions on the independent scene. At NWA New Year's Clash Pop-Up Event, Steve defeated Sam Shaw to become the new Tried N' True (TNT) Heavyweight Champion. In January 2019, Crazzy Steve had a one-off appearance at IMPACT's TV taping.

=== Return to Impact/TNA Wrestling (2020–2024, 2026) ===
On April 21, 2020, Steve re-signed with the company. Steve made his re-debut in a six-man tag team match with Tommy Dreamer and Rhino against Ohio Versus Everything (Dave Crist, Jake Crist and Madman Fulton) at Rebellion where Steve's team was victorious. On the May 19 episode of Impact!, he defeated Dave Crist in a singles match. On the July 28 episode of Impact!, Steve joined a bunch of wrestlers in the reality show Wrestle House. He lost against Acey Romero in a match where the winner gets to sleep in the ring. During Night 2 of Emergence, Steve defeated Johnny Swinger in a Blindfold match, where the loser had to dress like the winner the next week. On the September 1 episode of Impact!, he and the rest of the Wrestle House cast returned to the Impact Zone during Knockouts Champion Deonna Purrazzo's Black Tie Affair. On October 24, at Bound for Glory, he competed in the Call Your Shot Gauntlet match, which was won by Rhino. On the November 24 episode of Impact!, Steve disguised himself as Suicide and defeated Rohit Raju to get a shot at his X Division Championship, but lost the following week.

On the January 12, 2021 episode of Impact!, Steve prevented Kaleb with a K from interfering in his former ally Rosemary's match against Tenille Dashwood, which allowed Rosemary to win the match, thus marking a reunion of Decay. This led to Decay reuniting at the Hard To Kill pay-per-view and winning against Dashwood and Kaleb in an intergender tag team match. On July 31, at Homecoming, Steve teamed with Rosemary to compete in a tournament to crown a Homecoming King and Queen. They defeated Fallah Bahh and Tasha Steelz in the first round, Tommy Dreamer and Rachael Ellering in the semifinals, but lost to Deonna Purrazzo and Matthew Rehwoldt in the final. In October, Steve entered a tournament to determine the inaugural Impact Digital Media Champion, where he defeated Hernandez in the first round but lost to Jordynne Grace in the final at Bound for Glory.

On the August 31, 2023, episode of Impact!, Steve attacked the referee during a match with Mike Bailey, turning heel in the process. He then attempted to attack Bailey with a fork only to be stopped by Taurus in whom Steve attacked, ending Decay. This led to a match at Victory Road, where Steve defeated Taurus. During Impact 1000, Steve won the Feast or Fired briefcase containing a title opportunity for the Digital Media Championship. On January 13, 2024, at Hard To Kill, he defeated Tommy Dreamer to win the Digital Media Championship. On April 20 at Rebellion, Steve lost the title to Laredo Kid, ending his reign at 98 days. Steve left TNA on the same year.

The March 26, 2026 episode of Impact, Steve made his return during a segment with Rosemary.

=== Lucha Libre AAA Worldwide (2024) ===
On August 8, 2024, Crazzy Steve and Havok made their debut in Verano de Escandalo earning the opportunity for the AAA World Mixed Tag Team Championship after defeating a Aero Star and Estrellita and Negro Casas and Dalys. On October 6 at Héroes Inmortales, they managed to win the titles after defeating Abismo Negro Jr. and Flammer, being their first AAA championship as a team. On December 8, 2024 at Cierre De La Gira Origenes, Steve and Havok lost the titles to Mr. Iguana and La Hiedra.

=== Return to independent circuit (2025–present) ===
After leaving TNA, Steve returned to the independent circuit

== Personal life ==
Scott is legally blind as a result of congenital bilateral cataracts; his vision was not improved by the cataracts' surgical removal.

== Championships and accomplishments ==
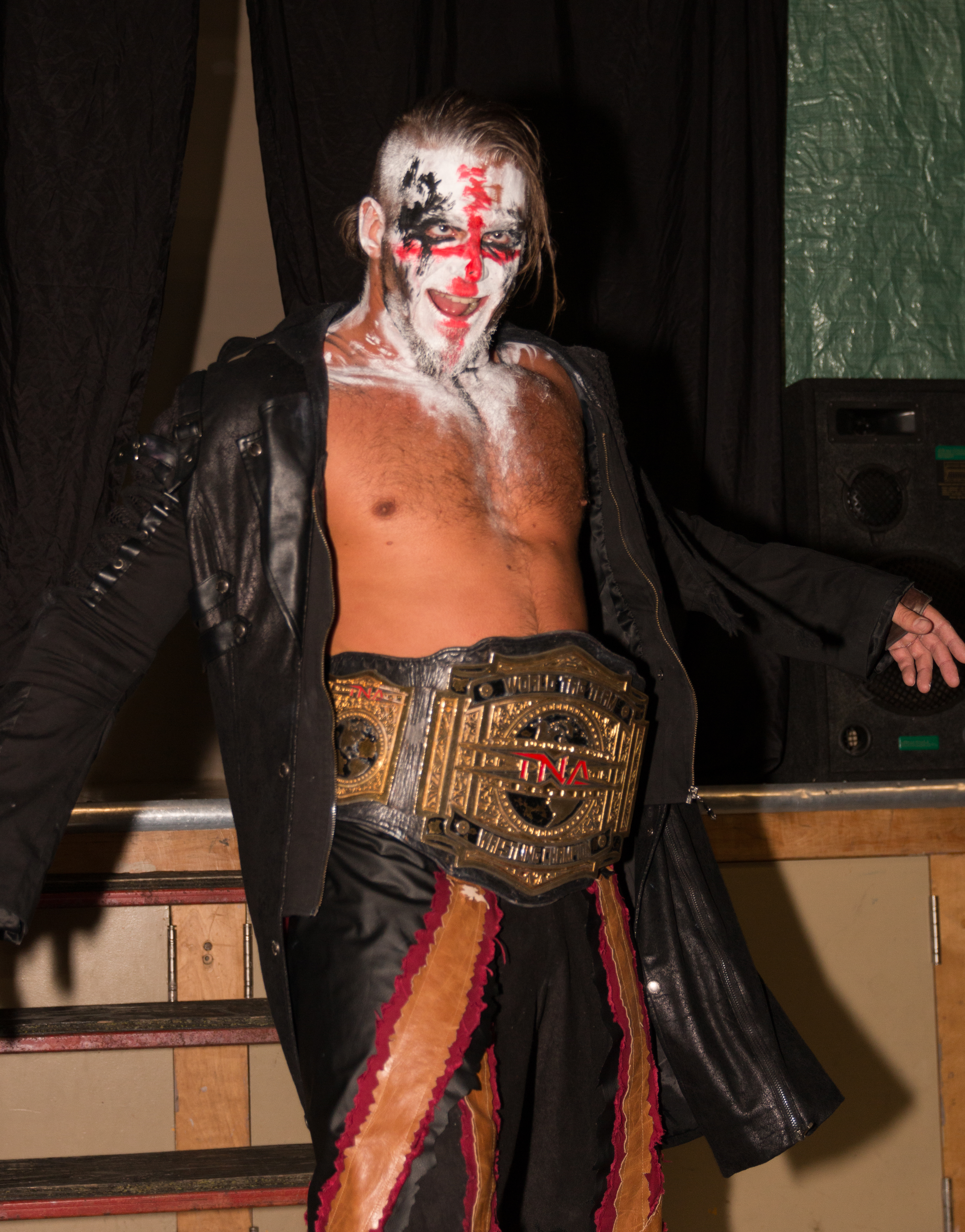
Crazzy Steve with the TNA World Tag Team Championship

- Canadian Wrestling Revolution
  - CWR Open Weight Championship (1 time)
  - CWR Pan-American Championship (1 time)
- Great Canadian Wrestling
  - GCW Tag Team Championship (2 times) – with Gutter (1) and Jake O'Reilly
- Fighting Spirit Pro Wrestling
  - FSPW Internet Championship (1 time)
- Living Legends Wrestling
  - LLW Light Heavyweight Championship (1 time)
- Lucha Libre AAA Worldwide
  - AAA World Mixed Tag Team Championship (1 time) – with Havok
- Maximum Pro Wrestling
  - MPW Georgian Bay Heavyweight Championship (1 time)
- Neo Spirit Pro Wrestling
  - NSPW Independent Championship (1 time)
  - NSPW Internet Championship (1 time)
- Old School Championship Wrestling
  - OSCW Intercontinental Championship (1 time)
- Pro Wrestling Illustrated
  - Ranked No. 68 of the top 500 singles wrestlers in the PWI 500 in 2017
- Renegade Wrestling Alliance
  - RWA Tag Team Championship (1 time) – with Gory
- International Wrestling Federation
  - IWF Heavyweight Championship (1 time)
- Total Nonstop Action Wrestling / Impact Wrestling
  - TNA World Tag Team Championship (1 time) – with Abyss
  - TNA Digital Media Championship (1 time)
  - Feast or Fired (2023 – Digital Media Championship contract)
  - TNA World Cup (2015) – with Jeff Hardy, Davey Richards, Rockstar Spud, Gunner and Gail Kim
- Tried-N-True Pro
  - Tried-N-True Championship (1 time, final)
- Bubba Amick Promotions
  - BAP Wrestling Championship (1 time, final)
