= Death Crew Council =

Professional wrestling stable

Stable
- Name(s): Death Crew Council; DCC
- Billed heights: James Storm: 6 ft 0 in (1.83 m); Bram: 6 ft 3 in (1.91 m); Kingston: 6 ft 1 in (1.85 m)
- Combined billed weight: 711 lb (323 kg)
- Former members: James Storm; Bram; Kingston
- Debut: October 20, 2016
- Disbanded: April 6, 2017
- Years active: 2016–2017

The Death Crew Council (abbreviated to DCC) was a heel professional wrestling stable in Total Nonstop Action Wrestling (TNA), consisting of James Storm, Bram and Kingston.

== History ==
=== Formation (2016) ===
The roots of the DCC go back to the August 4 episode of Impact Wrestling, when James Storm defeated Eli Drake to win the TNA King of the Mountain Championship. On August 11, he lost the TNA King of the Mountain Championship in a title vs. title match against Lashley. The following week on Impact Wrestling, Storm called the official for that match Brian Hebner to the ring to show him how he missed a three-count on Lashley that should have amounted to Storm winning all the titles instead, while complaining to Hebner, TNA President Billy Corgan came down to the ring and interjected himself into the discussion with Storm. Corgan insulted Storm and suggested that Storm "may not be able to win the big one." This set Storm off and he confronted and cornered Corgan, threatening to use Corgan to satisfy his bucket list goal of "kicking a rockstar's ass". Storm then left the ring and on the way up the ramp, Corgan yelled "James Storm is suspended indefinitely." Although unofficial, on September 15, 2016, he announced he was a free agent.

Following this, vignettes aired for many weeks with three masked men with altered voices cutting promos about not being the heroes or villains, but "those that will restore order" to TNA. Much of these promos likely revolved around the building feud between Corgan and Storm, however Corgan left TNA before the DCC's actual debut, and their motives were modified accordingly. The DCC made their Impact Zone debut on the October 20, 2016 episode of Impact Wrestling, when they attacked The Tribunal, following the latter's loss to TNA World Tag Team Champions, The Broken Hardys. The DCC continued their assault on TNA wrestlers, attacking Robbie E and Grado on the October 27 episode of Impact Wrestling. On the November 3 episode of Impact Wrestling, the DCC attacked the Hardys. As the faction was leaving, the Hardys challenged them to an immediate match and put their titles on the line; whether this was a handicap match or not, and what its official result was have never been specified. The match devolved into a backstage fight during which Matt Hardy suffered (kayfabe) amnesia, after being knocked off a forklift by one of the DCC members. On the November 10 episode of Impact Wrestling, and after laying out TNA World Heavyweight Champion Eddie Edwards, following his successful title defense against Eli Drake, the DCC revealed themselves to be Kingston, Bram and most shockingly, the man who claimed he had left TNA two months prior James Storm.

=== Various feuds (2016–2017) ===
On the November 17 episode of Impact Wrestling, the group defeated Edwards and Brother Nero in a No Disqualification 3-on-2 handicap match. The following week on the Thanksgiving episode of Impact Wrestling, Bram made his singles in-ring return defeating Brother Nero in a No Disqualification match following interference from Storm and Kingston. On the December 1 episode of Impact Wrestling, Bram and Kingston faced The Broken Hardys for the TNA Tag Team Championship, but were ultimately defeated. On December 15, Storm would appear at the Hardy Compound as a participant in the Tag Team Apocalypto match for Total Nonstop Deletion. The DCC would be eliminated by Decay, when a man whom Decay assault during "Delete or Decay" claimed to be Storm's partner and was knocked unconscious by Crazzy Steve and pinned by Abyss.

On the January 5, 2017 episode of Impact Wrestling, the DCC attacked Decay after their victory over The Helms Dynasty, when Storm and Bram ambushed them by smashing beer bottles over Abyss and Crazzy Steve's heads, with Bram issuing a threat to Rosemary afterwards. On the January 6 One Night Only: Live! PPV, Abyss and Crazzy Steve would ambush the DCC after Storm's victory over Jessie Godderz, misting Storm and Bram, incapacitating them while Abyss laid out Kingston with a chokeslam.

On the January 12 edition of Impact Wrestling, Bram revealed that he joined the DCC to get revenge on Decay for their prior attack and abduction in 2016. Bram and Kingston would face Decay in a losing effort, after James Storm attacked Abyss, resulting in a disqualification. At Genesis, the DCC were defeated by The Broken Hardys in a three-way tag team match that also included Decay, thus not winning their TNA World Tag Team Championship. On the January 19 episode of Impact Wrestling, Bram and Kingston competed in the first ever Race for the Case, capturing the yellow briefcase when Kingston knocked it out of Jessie Godderz's hands and into Bram's, later learning they have the #2 call out spot for the February 2 Open Fight Night episode of Impact Wrestling. On the February 2 episode of Impact Wrestling, the DCC used their Race for the Case briefcase to call out and defeat Decay in a Fall Count Anywhere match. At the end of the show, they would attack Ethan Carter III after his match against Eli Drake, only to attack him and his bodyguard Tyrus after. On the February 9 episode of Impact Wrestling, the DCC defeated Eli Drake and Tyrus in a handicap match.

On March 9 episode of Impact Wrestling, Bram and Kingston were quickly defeated by Impact's new tag-team Reno SCUM. After the match, the DCC argued with each other but were quickly reconciled and leaving the ring together. On March 30, 2017 Storm interrupted Ethan Carter III saying that he wants a world title shot. The next week Storm was interrupted by Bram and Kingston as Kingston spit in Storm's face, and Storm laid both guys out with superkicks, turning him face. Then, DCC disbanded quietly.

== Championships and accomplishments ==
- Total Nonstop Action Wrestling
  - Race for the Case (2017 – Yellow Case) – Bram
- DDT Pro-Wrestling
  - Ironman Heavymetalweight Championship (1 time) – Kingston
