= Andrew Everett and Trevor Lee =

Professional wrestling tag team

Tag team
- Members: Andrew Everett; Trevor Lee; Gregory Shane Helms (manager)
- Name(s): Andrew Everett and Trevor Lee; The Helms Dynasty
- Billed heights: Andrew Everett: 5 ft 9 in (1.75 m); Trevor Lee: 6 ft 0 in (1.83 m)
- Combined billed weight: 429 lb (195 kg)
- Debut: March 16, 2014
- Disbanded: November 6, 2017
- Years active: 2014–2017

Andrew Everett and Trevor Lee were a professional wrestling tag team that competed in various professional wrestling promotions between 2014 and 2017. The team is perhaps best known for its time in Total Nonstop Action Wrestling (TNA), where they were managed by Gregory Shane Helms as The Helms Dynasty. The general background of the team was that Helms helped train both Everett and Lee and in OMEGA Wrestling, and then brought them with him to TNA to be the top entity of the X Division.

Aside from TNA, the team is also known for performing in various independent promotions, most notably Pro Wrestling Guerrilla, where they held the World Tag Team Championship once and won the Dynamite Duumvirate Tag Team Title Tournament in 2015. The team was also successful in All American Wrestling, winning the promotion's Tag Team Championship once.

== History ==
=== Independent circuit ===
==== Premiere Wrestling Xperience (2014–2015) ====
Belonging to North Carolina and being trained by The Hardy Boyz at OMEGA Wrestling, Everett and Lee teamed together in various promotions in North Carolina. They debuted together as a team at a Premiere Wrestling Xperience television taping on March 16, 2014, where they unsuccessfully challenged Los Ben Dejos (Jay Cruz and Jay Rios) for the PWX Tag Team Championship. They would wrestle a few more matches for PWX in 2015, and received another title shot at the Tag Team Championship against Bravado Brothers at Superkick World on July 12, but lost by disqualification.

==== CWF Mid-Atlantic (2015–2016) ====
Everett began teaming with Lee in CWF Mid-Atlantic as an ally of Lee and Chet Sterling, Lee's co-holder of the Tag Team Championship. They first teamed at Double or Nothing on April 4, 2015, where Everett teamed with Sterling and Lee to defeat The RIOT (Aric Andrews, Lee Valiant and Nick Richards). Everett and Lee wrestled various matches together as a team and often teamed with Sterling in multiple matches. The most notable match was a two out of three falls match six-man tag team match in the main event of Ultimate Survivor, where Sterling, Lee and Everett defeated Arik Royal, Brad Attitude and Lee Valiant. At Crews Center Clash, Lee and Everett teamed for the last time for the promotion in which they defeated Royal and Attitude.

==== Pro Wrestling Guerilla (2015) ====
After having competed in singles competition for the promotion before, Everett and Lee were announced to compete as a team for the first time in Pro Wrestling Guerrilla on April 5, 2015. Their first match as a team in PWG took place at Dynamite Duumvirate Tag Team Title Tournament on May 22, where they competed in the namesake tournament, defeating Matt Sydal and Mike Bailey in the quarter-final, The Inner City Machine Guns (Rich Swann and Ricochet) in the semi-final, and The Beaver Boys (Alex Reynolds and John Silver) in the final to win the tournament and the World Tag Team Championship. The following month, Lee and Everett lost the titles to The Young Bucks (Matt Jackson and Nick Jackson) at Mystery Vortex III, after interference by Roderick Strong, which led to the formation of Mount Rushmore 2.0. On the second night of Battle of Los Angeles, Everett and Lee teamed for the last time in PWG as they teamed with Biff Busick against Mount Rushmore 2.0 (Matt Jackson, Nick Jackson and Super Dragon) in a Guerrilla Warfare, which Mount Rushmore 2.0 won.

==== Southside Wrestling Entertainment (2015) ====
Everett and Lee competed in the English promotion Southside Wrestling Entertainment (SWE) at the promotion's 5th Anniversary Show on October 24, 2015, where they lost to The Hunter Brothers (Jim Hunter and Lee Hunter).

==== All American Wrestling (2016) ====
Everett and Lee's first match as a team in All American Wrestling (AAW) took place at United We Stand on July 23, 2016, where they lost to Johnny Gargano and Tommaso Ciampa. After a few matches in AAW, Everett and Lee achieved major success by defeating Best in the World (Davey Vega and Mat Fitchett) to win the AAW Tag Team Championship at Windy City Classic XII. However, they did not defend the titles after the title win and were stripped off the titles on March 10, 2017.

=== Total Nonstop Action Wrestling (2015–2017) ===
Everett and Lee both debuted as singles competitors in the X Division in Total Nonstop Action Wrestling (TNA) in 2015. They first teamed in TNA at a live event during the Road To Bound for Glory Tour on October 2, where they unsuccessfully challenged The Wolves (Davey Richards and Eddie Edwards) for the TNA World Tag Team Championship. However, they remained in singles competition on television.

On the February 2, 2016, episode of Impact Wrestling, Lee defeated Tigre Uno to win the TNA X Division Championship, with the help from his new manager Gregory Shane Helms. During his reigns, he successfully retained his title against Tigre Uno, Eddie Edwards and DJZ. On the April 19 episode of Impact Wrestling, Everett interrupted a match between Lee, Eddie Edwards and DJZ, helping Lee, forming The Helms Dynasty. On the May 17 episode of Impact Wrestling, The Helms Dynasty faced the team of Edwards and DJZ in a losing effort. At May Mayhem, Lee defended the X Division Championship in an Ultimate X match against Edwards, DJZ and Everett, with the latter competing to assist Lee in retaining the title. Lee retained the title after interference by Helms. However, on June 12 at Slammiversary, Lee lost the X Division Championship to Edwards in a four-way match, involving Everett and DJZ, ending his reign at 155 days.

On the October 6 episode of Impact Wrestling, The Helms Dynasty would team with Marshe Rockett in the first Team X Gold match, losing against DJZ, Mandrews and Braxton Sutter. On the November 24 episode of Impact Wrestling, The Helms Dynasty and Rockett would team up once more in a losing effort in a Team X Gold triple threat elimination match, going up against Team Go for Broke (DJZ, Mandrews and Braxton Sutter) and Decay and Rockstar Spud, where the winning team would become #1 contenders for the X Division Championship. During a TNA taping Lee defeated DJZ to win the TNA X Division Championship for the second time. On February 9, 2017, Everett was attacked by Lee and Helms, ending the team.

== Championships and accomplishments ==
- All American Wrestling
  - AAW Tag Team Championship (1 time)
- Pro Wrestling Guerrilla
  - PWG World Tag Team Championship (1 time)
  - Dynamite Duumvirate Tag Team Title Tournament (2015)
- Total Nonstop Action Wrestling
  - TNA X Division Championship (2 times) – Trevor Lee
  - Race for the Case (2017 – Blue Case) – Trevor Lee
