= Eddie Kingston =

American professional wrestler (born 1981)

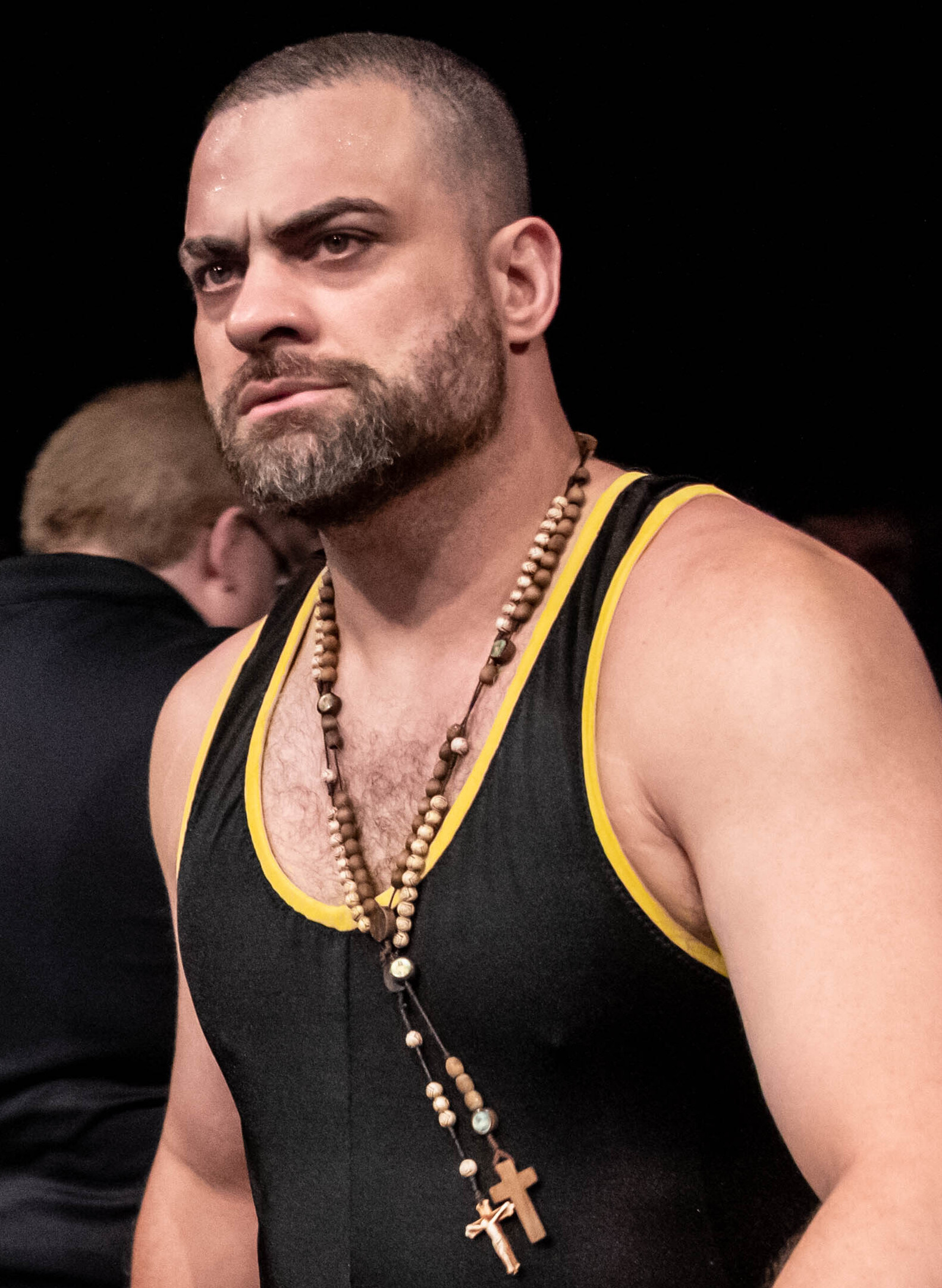
- Kingston in January 2022

Personal information
- Born: Edward Moore; December 12, 1981 (age 44) Yonkers, New York, U.S.

Professional wrestling career
- Ring name(s): Dragon Dragon; Eddie Kingston; Eddie Moore; King; Kingston
- Billed height: 6 ft 1 in (185 cm)
- Billed weight: 240 lb (109 kg)
- Billed from: Yonkers, New York
- Trained by: Chikara Wrestle Factory; Chris Hero; Kevin Knight; Mike Quackenbush; Reckless Youth
- Debut: October 12, 2002

Edward Moore (born December 12, 1981), better known by his ring name Eddie Kingston, is an American professional wrestler. He is signed to All Elite Wrestling (AEW), where he is a one-time and the inaugural AEW Continental Champion. He also performs for AEW's sister promotion Ring of Honor (ROH), where he is a one-time ROH World Champion, and in Japan for New Japan Pro-Wrestling (NJPW), where he is a one-time Strong Openweight Champion. He simultaneously defended all three championships as the singular Continental Crown Championship.

Moore started his wrestling career in 2002, and has wrestled for numerous promotions, including Evolve, the National Wrestling Alliance (NWA), Chikara, AAW Wrestling, Combat Zone Wrestling, Independent Wrestling Association Mid-South, Impact Wrestling, Pro Wrestling Guerrilla (PWG) and Consejo Mundial de Lucha Libre (CMLL). Outside of brief stints in Impact and ROH, he was a mainstay on the independent circuit for 18 years before signing with AEW.

== Early life ==
Edward Moore was born in Yonkers, New York, on December 12, 1981, the son of a Puerto Rican mother and Irish father. He had a difficult childhood in Yonkers and was constantly getting into fights at school, later stating that he was kept out of trouble and potentially jail by watching old wrestling tapes, particularly from the Continental Wrestling Association and All Japan Pro Wrestling; he estimates that he has watched the June 1994 match between Toshiaki Kawada and Mitsuharu Misawa over 1,000 times. He was a member of the Iron Workers Union to support himself whilst pursuing a career in wrestling.

== Professional wrestling career ==
=== Training ===
Moore initially trained alongside BlackJack Marciano and Jigsaw under Kevin Knight at the Independent Wrestling Federation in Woodland Park, New Jersey. After he was kicked out of the school for undisclosed reasons, he became part of the second class of students to train at the Chikara Wrestle Factory under Mike Quackenbush and Chris Hero.

=== Chikara (2002–2016) ===
==== Wild Cards / Toxic Trio (2002–2004) ====
On October 12, 2002, Moore made his professional wrestling debut under the ring name Eddie Kingston at Chikara's seventh event, where he and BlackJack Marciano (a tag team known as the Wild Cards) defeated Melvin Snodgrass and Lester Crabtree in a tag team match. In 2003, the Wild Cards began feuding with Ultra/ZERO (Mister ZERO and UltraMantis). The feud came to an end on July 5, when Ultra/ZERO defeated the Wild Cards in the semifinals of the 2003 Tag World Grand Prix, after which the Wild Cards moved on to feuding with Team F.I.S.T. (Icarus and Gran Akuma). The following year, the Wild Cards teamed up with Jigsaw to form the Toxic Trio, while Team F.I.S.T. recruited Quackenbush. On May 22, 2004, the Toxic Trio faced Team F.I.S.T. in an Ultimate Jeopardy match where the Wild Cards' hair, Jigsaw's and Akuma's masks, and Quackenbush's various championships were on the line. Akuma forced Kingston to tap out to end the match and, per the stipulation, both the Wild Cards were shaved bald. On September 18, 2004, the Wild Cards won the IWA Mid-South Tag Team Championship and enjoyed reasonable success outside of Chikara, until a knee injury forced Marciano into retirement, thus disbanding the team.

==== Feud with Chris Hero (2005) ====
After taking a break from wrestling, Kingston returned to the ring in July 2005, turning face and teaming with Sabian, Equinox and Quackenbush to take on the Kings of Wrestling (Chris Hero, Claudio Castagnoli, Gran Akuma and Arik Cannon). On August 13, Hero defeated Kingston in a singles match, that would lead the two into feuding with each other over at Combat Zone Wrestling, while in Chikara they were kept apart from each other following the match. For a majority of 2006, Kingston had a rivalry against Larry Sweeney. Kingston and Sweeney traded many verbal and physical exchanges for months, and the feud culminated with a No Disqualification Strap match between the two at Chikara's last show of the year. Kingston won this match and the overall feud.

==== BLKOUT / Roughnecks (2007–2009) ====
In 2007, Kingston turned heel (villainous) when he was pinned in an eight-man tag team match. Following the loss, Kingston attacked Hallowicked and attempted to remove his mask. The resulting feud lasted for over six months. During this time Kingston frequently forced his opponents to wear a replica of Hallowicked's mask. The feud ended when Kingston defeated Hallowicked in a Falls Count Anywhere match.

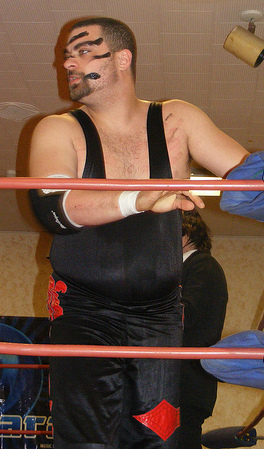
Kingston in 2008

Kingston, along with fellow BLKOUT stable members Joker and Ruckus, went on to the finals of the 2008 King of Trios tournament, coming up short against the team of El Pantera, Incognito and Lince Dorado, when Kingston tapped out to Dorado's Chikara Special. After the tournament Kingston was not seen in Chikara for two months, but when he returned in May, he quickly targeted the man who had forced him to tap out at King of Trios, Lince Dorado. Kingston defeated Dorado in back-to-back singles matches on July 13 and August 10, but both times Dorado refused to stay down and begged for more. On September 7 Kingston and Dorado face each other in their third singles match, which ended when referee Bryce Remsburg disqualified Kingston due to "excessive punishment". However, once again Dorado refused to stay down and demanded the match to be restarted. After the restart, Kingston had himself disqualified by low blowing Dorado and then walked out, before declaring that he was done with Dorado, since he was making him mentally unstable with his actions.

In late 2008, Kingston would team up with Brodie Lee and Grizzly Redwood to form a trio named the Roughnecks. They defeated the Order of the Neo-Solar Temple (UltraMantis Black, Crossbones, and Sami Callihan) to advance to the 2009 King of Trios, where they were eliminated in the first round by Team Uppercut (Claudio Castagnoli, Bryan Danielson, and Dave Taylor). Following the loss, Kingston started a feud with Castagnoli, claiming that he had been embarrassed and disrespected. On May 24, 2009, at Aniversario Yang, Kingston, who claimed to be able to out-wrestle Castagnoli, pinned him cleanly with an Oklahoma roll. After Castagnoli defeated Kingston via countout at the 2009 Young Lions Cup, the two of them were booked in a "Respect match" at the season eight finale Three-Fisted Tales, where the loser of the match had to show respect to the winner. Castagnoli won the match, but instead of showing respect, Kingston laid him out with a spinning back fist after claiming that both Castagnoli and his former tag team partner Chris Hero were shady and deserved respect from no one. At the end of the event, Kingston was proven right as Castagnoli turned heel and formed the stable Bruderschaft des Kreuzes (BDK).

==== Feud with BDK (2010–2011) ====
On January 31, 2010, at the season nine premiere Kingston, now a tecnico, replaced Lince Dorado, after he had turned on his tecnico teammates and joined BDK, and teamed up with Mike Quackenbush, Jigsaw and Equinox in an eight-man tag team match against Castagnoli, Ares, Tursas and Dorado. BDK won the match, when Castagnoli pinned Kingston after a low blow. After the match Kingston once again refused to show respect to Castagnoli and was therefore beaten down. On March 21 Kingston re-ignited his old feud with BDK's newest recruit Lince Dorado by facing him in a singles match. Dorado won by disqualification by taking his mask off behind the referees back and throwing it at Kingston, who was holding it when the ref turned around. This is an automatic disqualification as per lucha libre rules. After the match Kingston attacked Dorado, while also taking care of BDK members Pinkie Sanchez, Sara Del Rey and Tim Donst, who attempted to make the save, before he was stopped by Castagnoli, who once again demanded the respect he was owed from Three-Fisted Tales. On May 23 Kingston was set to wrestle one of his idols, Tommy Dreamer, at Chikara's eighth anniversary show, but the match was ruined by interference from Castagnoli and Ares. After Dreamer helped Kingston take care of BDK, the two made a challenge for a tag team match for Chikara's July 25 show in The Arena in Philadelphia. On July 25 at Chikarasaurus Rex: King of Show Kingston and Dreamer were defeated in a non-title tag team match by Ares and Castagnoli. On October 23 Kingston represented Chikara in the torneo cibernetico match, where the company's originals faced BDK. He eliminated Daizee Haze and Sara Del Rey from the match, before being stuck in a two-on-one disadvantage against BDK members Claudio Castagnoli and Tursas. Castagnoli was disqualified from the match, after low blowing Kingston, but Kingston managed to come back and pin Tursas to win the 2010 torneo cibernetico. On March 13, 2011, in Brooklyn, New York, Castagnoli defeated Kingston, after hitting him with a chain, in a grudge match fifteen months in the making.

==== Chikara Grand Champion (2011–2014) ====
In September 2011, Kingston made his first tour of Japan, with the Osaka Pro Wrestling promotion, which had a working relationship with Chikara. During the tour, Kingston teamed with the villainous Joker stable.

People ask me why I call the Grand Championship "her". You see, as a 33-year-old man, the only time I've felt love or wanted to give love out was when I had the Grand Championship. When I had her. For 33 years, I've had a hole in my chest that could not be filled by anything in this life but her. When I held her at night, when I defended her in that ring it gave me peace. It gave me calm. It gave me a purpose. Icarus, do you understand? Hallowicked, do you understand how it feels to walk this Earth and not have a purpose? For 33 years, to walk around in life not knowing what you are meant for? Just aimlessly wandering around. When I got her, I knew why I was here. I knew why God put me on this green Earth was to protect her. To be with her. To love her. She is more than a title. She is way more than a belt. She is the love of my life and Icarus, you took her from me? I hate you! I hate the air that you breathe! I hate the fact that you're even living. You make me sick! You should not be alive; you should not breathe the same air I breathe! You are scum! You are below me! You will always be number two! And at the season finale (CHIKARA Top Banana), for you taking her away from me, for you taking my peace, my calm that I've been looking for for my whole life, I will bury you. And right before the daylight dies outta your eyes, Icarus, you're gonna see me laughing and smiling.

Hallowicked ... There's nothing personal with you. There's nothing deep with you like there is with Icarus, but you hold her. You hold my wife. You hold my love. So I'm gonna bust your gut open and I'm gonna watch you die at the season finale and then she will finally come back to me. And days before I turn 34-years-old, 14 years in this great sport, I will have my purpose again and I will have my life one more time. This is deeper than anything in the world. Anything in wrestling. This is life. This is purpose. This is everything.

— Eddie Kingston, December 2015

From May to October 2011, Kingston took part in 12 Large: Summit, a tournament used to determine the first ever Chikara Grand Champion. Kingston ended up winning his block of the tournament with a record of four wins and one loss to set up a final match with the winner of the other block, Mike Quackenbush. On November 13 at Chikara's first internet pay-per-view, High Noon, Kingston defeated Quackenbush to become the first Chikara Grand Champion.

On February 26, 2012, Kingston made his first defense of the Grand Championship, defeating Vin Gerard, with whom he had developed a rivalry during the 12 Large: Summit. On March 25, Kingston defeated Brodie Lee in his second title defense. Kingston made his third successful title defense on April 28, defeating Kevin Steen via disqualification in an interpromotional match between Chikara and Ring of Honor. Kingston followed up by making successful title defenses against Jigsaw on May 20 at Chikara's tenth anniversary event, Dasher Hatfield on June 24 and Sara Del Rey on July 28. On September 15, during the second night of the 2012 King of Trios, Kingston made his seventh successful title defense against Osaka Pro Wrestling representative Tadasuke. Afterwards, Kingston was attacked by Tim Donst. On November 18, Kingston led a team to take on Team Steen in the ninth annual torneo cibernetico match. After Kingston managed to eliminate Steen, he was himself pinned for the win by Tim Donst. On December 2, Kingston defeated Donst in the main event of Chikara's third internet pay-per-view, Under the Hood, to retain the Grand Championship for the eighth time.

Kingston's ninth successful defense took place during Chikara's first weekend of 2013 on February 10, when he defeated Kevin Steen. Kingston was next scheduled to defend his title against Green Ant on March 9, but ended up no-showing the event. Kingston later revealed that he had gotten drunk the previous night, punched a mirror in his hotel room and injured a tendon in his hand. On April 6, Kingston defeated Hallowicked for his tenth successful defense of the Grand Championship. During the weekend of May 3 and 4, Kingston made two more successful title defenses against Green Ant and Mark Angelosetti. Kingston's thirteenth successful title defense took place on May 18 against Archibald Peck. Kingston's fourteenth defense on June 2 at Aniversario: Never Compromise ended in controversy, when, just as his challenger Icarus had locked him in a submission hold, the ring was attacked by a group named "Condor Security", ending the match in a no contest.

After a one-year hiatus, Chikara returned on May 25, 2014, with You Only Live Twice, where Kingston lost the Grand Championship to Icarus, ending his two and a half year reign.

==== Final appearances (2014–2016) ====
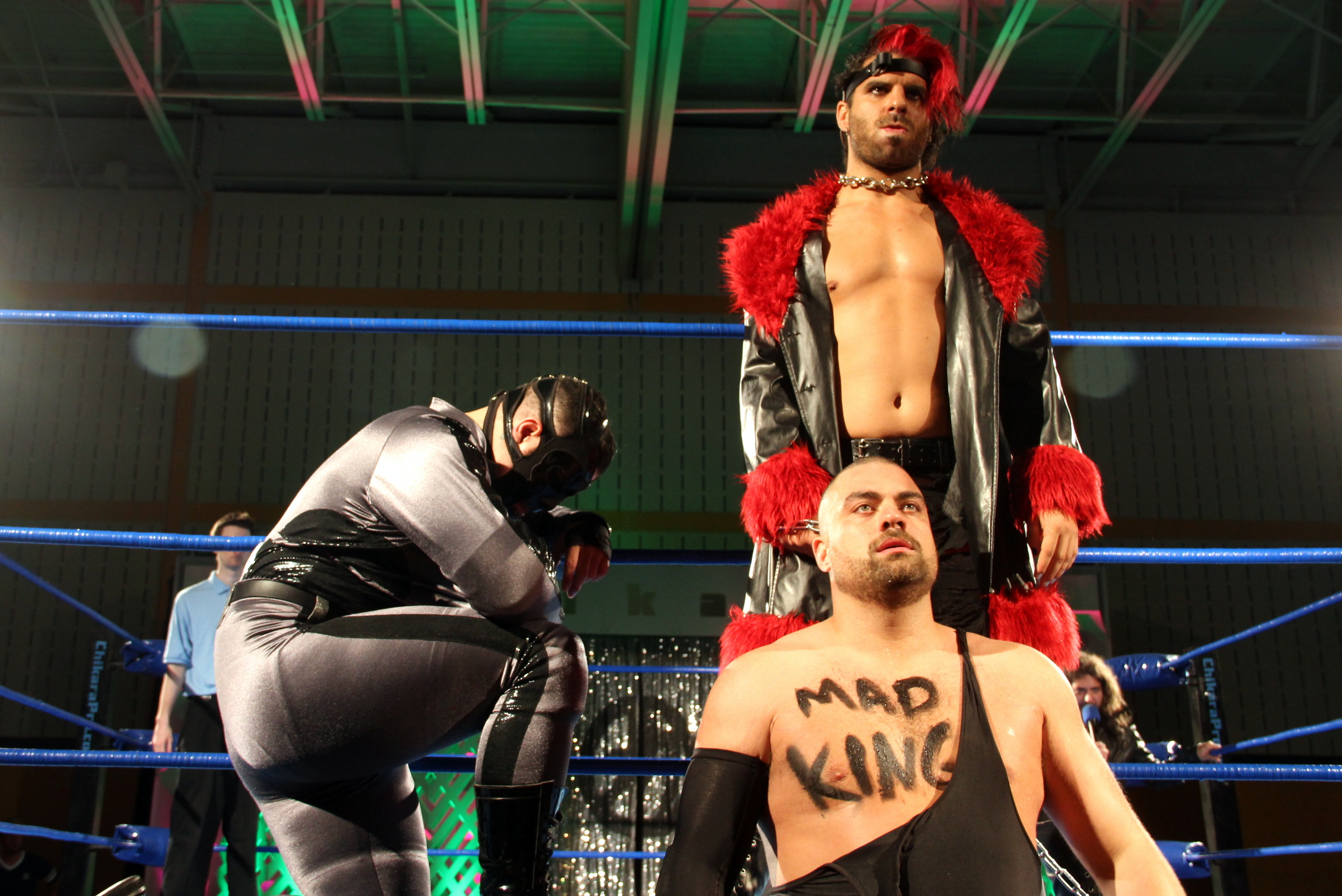
Kingston (bottom) with Volgar (left) and Jimmy Jacobs (right) as part of the Flood in September 2014

After losing the Grand Championship, Kingston turned rudo and joined the Flood stable in order to regain the Grand Championship. The alliance, however, was short-lived with Kingston turning on the Flood on September 21. This led to a rivalry between Kingston and Flood's second-in-command, Jimmy Jacobs, which culminated on December 6 at Tomorrow Never Dies, where Kingston defeated Jacobs in a grudge match.

=== Independent Wrestling Association Mid-South (2003–2008) ===
Kingston has made on-and-off appearances for Independent Wrestling Association Mid-South since 2003. From his debut through the end of 2004, most of his activity involved tagging with Marciano as the Wild Cards. The duo won the IWA Mid-South Tag Team Championship once, and successfully defended them on numerous occasions. After Marciano's retirement, however, Kingston's Mid-South work mainly involved one-on-one matches, including a lengthy feud against Ian Rotten. He also rekindled his feud with Hero during the 2007 Ted Petty Invitational, and on the final night of the tournament, Kingston defeated Hero in a Last Man Standing match, which is considered the 2007 Match of the Year for the company.

On December 7, 2007, Kingston won a four-way elimination match against Hero, then-champion Quackenbush, and Chuck Taylor to win the IWA Mid-South Heavyweight Championship. On April 11, 2008, Kingston no-showed a scheduled event, resulting in IWA Mid-South owner Ian Rotten stripping him of the championship. Rotten told the crowd that Kingston was "going through some personal problems", but that he was welcome back to the promotion once he got his act together. Kingston participated in the 2008 Ted Petty Invitational tournament, defeating Necro Butcher in the first round on Night One, but losing to Sami Callihan in the quarter-finals.

=== Combat Zone Wrestling (2004–2012) ===
Kingston made his debut in Combat Zone Wrestling (CZW) in early 2004, competing in a series of tag team matches showcasing Chikara wrestlers, before joining the roster as the enforcer and mouthpiece in the BLKOUT faction. Kingston and fellow BLKOUT member Joker won the CZW World Tag Team Championship from the Kings of Wrestling (Chris Hero and Claudio Castagnoli) on February 11, 2006, at Seven Years Strong: Settling The Score. Seven months later on September 9, Kingston defeated Chris Hero to win the CZW World Heavyweight Championship after an extended feud. As a result of winning the CZW World Championship, BLKOUT vacated the tag team championship, and the Kings of Wrestling won them in a tournament, but were attacked by BLKOUT afterwards. After a successful world title defence against Justice Pain at Night of Infamy 5, due to Hero interfering and accidentally hitting Pain, Kingston lost the title to Pain in a three-way elimination match, also involving Hero. Kingston was eliminated first, after suffering a legitimate broken ankle, after botching a backdrop.

At the following show, Hero challenged Kingston to a Loser Leaves Town match when he returned. In his return match at Redemption on March 10, 2007, Kingston defeated Hydra. On April 7, at Out With the Old, In With the New, Kingston defeated Hero in a Loser Leaves Town match. Following the match, CZW owner John Zandig went to the ring and publicly fired Kingston for "ongoing misconduct". This was suspected by many to be an angle, but was later found out to have been legitimate. Kingston released a public interview on YouTube discussing the matter, but the footage was removed only hours later.

Kingston did not appear in CZW for nearly a year following this, but eventually made his return at New Years Resolutions on January 12, 2008, in the main event for the CZW World Heavyweight Championship. Kingston returned to Combat Zone Wrestling on February 14, 2009, at its 10th Anniversary Show, in a losing effort to CZW World Heavyweight Champion Drake Younger in a No Rope Barbed Wire Deathmatch. Kingston and Younger went on to defeat The Best Around (TJ Cannon and Bruce Maxwell) on April 10, 2010, to win the CZW World Tag Team Championship. After a successful title defense on June 12 against Cult Fiction (Brain Damage and Masada), Kingston threw his World Tag Team Championship belt down and once again quit CZW. Kingston's title reign officially ended on July 10, when CZW owner D. J. Hyde stripped him and Younger of the title.

=== Westside Xtreme Wrestling (2004–2010, 2013, 2020) ===
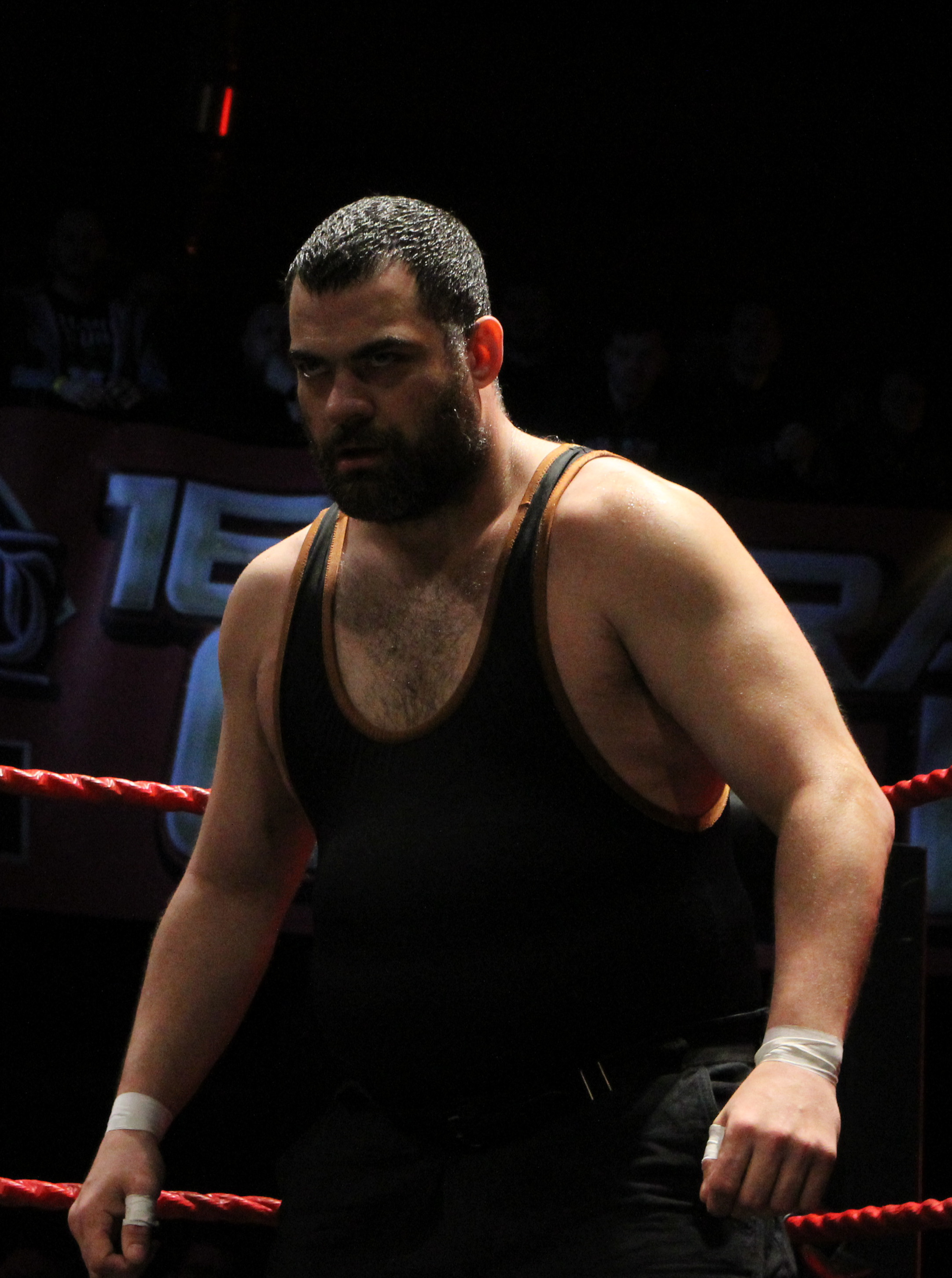
Kingston at a WXw 16 Carat Gold Tournament show in March 2020.

Kingston first appeared in Westside Xtreme Wrestling (wXw) in 2004, as part of a Chikara exhibition match. On August 21, at "Broken Rulz", the Wild Cards and Hallowicked were defeated by Gran Akuma, Jigsaw and Mike Quackenbush. He then appeared two years later, as part of the Joint@Venture event in February 2005. On day one, he and Hallowicked were defeated by Dark Dream (Darksoul and X-dream). On day two, he, Hallowicked and Skayde were defeated by Akuma, Jigsaw and Quackenbush. On March 13, 2010, at The Vision, Kingston was defeated by Big Van Walter in a singles match.

Kingston was brought back to wXw for the 2013 edition of 16 Carat Gold. On night one, he defeated Chuck Taylor in the first round. On night two, he was defeated by Shinobu in the quarter-final. On night three, he partnered Kim Ray in a defeat to Hot & Spicy (Axel Dieter Jr. and Da Mack). Seven years later, Kingston returned to the promotion for the 2020 edition of 16 Carat Gold. On night one, he defeated Daniel Makabe in the first round. On night two, he defeated The Rotation in the quarter-final. On night three, he was defeated by Cara Noir in the semi-final.

=== Ring of Honor (2006–2014) ===
Kingston made his first appearance in Ring of Honor at Death Before Dishonor IV on July 15, 2006, as the fifth member of Team CZW in the Cage of Death match, which Team CZW lost.

Kingston's next appearance was on March 14, 2008, when he showed up in the audience during a match between the Vulture Squad and Austin Aries and Bryan Danielson. During the match, Kingston harassed Ruckus, a member of the Vulture Squad in ROH and Kingston's stablemate in BLKOUT in other promotions, and claimed he'd be in Philadelphia on March 16, 2008, during ROH's Take No Prisoners pay-per-view. During the non-pay-per-view portion of the show, Kingston, Sabian and Robbie Morino of BLKOUT got into a brawl with Jigsaw and Julius Smokes of The Vulture Squad, while Ruckus tried to restrain both factions. In June it was announced that BLKOUT was planning on disrupting ROH's pay-per-view taping, Respect is Earned II, on June 7. The Vulture Squad responded with Jigsaw challenging Kingston to face him in a match. Kingston appeared with BLKOUT, but failed to defeat Jigsaw, while Ruckus again tried to calm down both of his stables.

Kingston wrestled at the Ring of Honor Wrestling tapings on March 1, 2009, in Philadelphia, defeating Sami Callihan. Kingston then appeared on March 18 ROH videowire, and soon after re-developed his feud with Chris Hero. On December 19, 2009, at Final Battle 2009, ROH's first live pay-per-view, Kingston defeated Hero in a "Fight Without Honor" match to win the feud.

Kingston returned to ROH on March 4, 2012, at the 10th Anniversary Show, where he represented Chikara as the Grand Champion and had a confrontation with Kevin Steen. This led to a Grand Championship match in Chikara, where Kingston defeated Steen via disqualification. Kingston returned to ROH at the June 29 tapings of Ring of Honor Wrestling, saving Mike Mondo from Steen and Jimmy Jacobs. He then went on to unsuccessfully challenge Steen for the ROH World Championship on August 11 at Boiling Point.

On August 17, 2013, Kingston returned to ROH, forming a new tag team with Homicide. In their return match, the two defeated Marshall Law (Q.T. Marshall and R.D. Evans). Following the main event of the evening, Kingston and Homicide attacked new ROH World Tag Team Champions, reDRagon (Bobby Fish and Kyle O'Reilly), before announcing their intention of taking down "corporate ROH" and revealing their team name as "Outlaw Inc.". Kingston and Homicide, however, claimed that they had come to ROH to help Match Maker Nigel McGuinness and take out those they felt were bad for the promotion. As part of the gimmick, Kingston and Homicide wore suits and followed the Code of Honor. After defeating The American Wolves (Davey Richards and Eddie Edwards) on November 16, Outlaw Inc. were named the next challengers for the ROH World Tag Team Championship. Outlaw Inc. received their title shot on December 14 at Final Battle 2013, but were defeated by reDRagon. Post-match, Kingston and Homicide announced that they were no longer going to play by ROH's rules. Kingston's last few ROH appearances were in the spring of 2014. After Homicide and Eddie jumped Kevin Steen and Cliff Compton during their No DQ match a tag team match was announced. This tag match saw Outlaw Inc. losing and they were never seen again.

=== Jersey All Pro Wrestling (2007–2012) ===
From 2007 to 2010, Kingston competed regularly in the New Jersey–based Jersey All Pro Wrestling (JAPW) organization. After winning a number one contenders match on February 24, Kingston defeated Bandido, Jr. on February 28 at JAPW's Jersey City Rumble to win the JAPW New Jersey State Championship. He would hold the title for little over two months before losing it to Archadia. On January 23, 2010, at JAPW's 12th Anniversary Show, Kingston had his biggest match to date in the promotion, unsuccessfully challenging Dan Maff for the JAPW Heavyweight Championship. Kingston returned to JAPW on April 14, 2012, when he and Homicide defeated Philly's Most Wanted (Blk Jeez and Joker) to win the vacant JAPW Tag Team Championship.

=== Pro Wrestling Guerrilla (2007–2008) ===
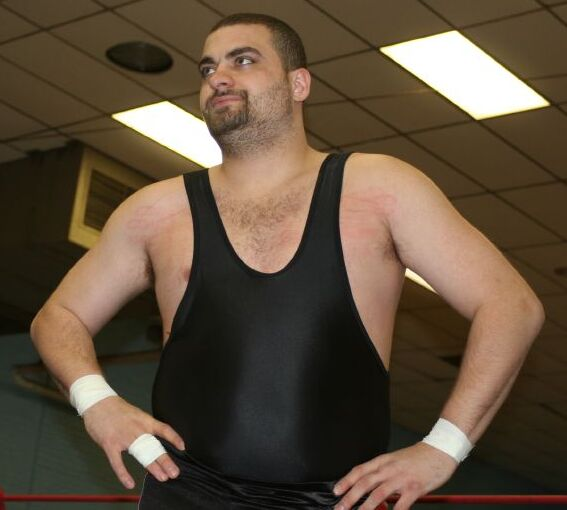
Kingston at a PWG show in 2008

On November 11, 2007, Kingston debuted in Pro Wrestling Guerrilla (PWG) as Human Tornado's mystery tag team partner. It was revealed earlier on that Tornado's opponent, Chris Hero, had also picked Kingston as his partner, but Kingston had chosen to side with Tornado. Kingston and Tornado lost a Handicap match to Hero via a disqualification caused by Claudio Castagnoli. Post-match, the three men collectively attacked Hero and showed signs of the forming of a new stable.

On January 5, 2008, Tornado, Castagnoli and Kingston defeated the three-person unit of Hero, Necro Butcher and Hero's then-valet Candice LeRae in a No Disqualification match. The competing stables would have a variety of matches against each other throughout the year, with various members facing off one-on-one. As a team, Kingston and Castagnoli were also involved in a brief feud against The Dynasty (Joey Ryan and Scott Lost), which began when they interfered in a PWG World Tag Team Championship match between The Dynasty and challengers the Briscoe Brothers (Jay Briscoe and Mark Briscoe) on May 7. A title match was booked between Castagnoli and Kingston and The Dynasty on two consecutive shows, both of which Kingston missed. Soon after missing the second event, Kingston's name was removed from the roster page.

On August 30, it was announced that Kingston would return for All Star Weekend VII. On Night One, he competed in a four-way match for the PWG World Championship; participants included Necro Butcher, former champion Low Ki, and defending champion Hero, who pinned Kingston to retain. Following the match, Kingston assaulted Hero, forcing PWG officials to pull them apart. On Night Two, Kingston was defeated by Necro Butcher in a Necro Butcher Rules match.

=== Other promotions (2011–present) ===
During 2011, Kingston worked for the newly founded Urban Wrestling Federation (UWF) promotion. On June 23, 2013, Kingston and Homicide were defeated by The Steiner Brothers (Rick and Scott) at House of Hardcore 2. At the following event on November 9, they were defeated by Devon and Matt Hardy.

On September 29, 2016, Kingston was part of a group of about 40 wrestlers invited to a WWE tryout at their Performance Center and was offered a coaching role in the promotion, but turned it down. Kingston lost to Bull Dempsey on January 26, 2018, at House of Hardcore 37. On September 9, 2018, Kingston lost to Brody King at PCW Ultra's Vision Quest in Wilmington, California. In September 2023, Kingston announced that he will no longer be taking independent bookings due to championship responsibilities and a back injury.

Kingston made his return to the independent scene on February 9, 2024, for DEFY Wrestling at DEFY Seven, where he defeated Artemis Spencer.

=== Total Nonstop Action Wrestling / Impact Wrestling (2016–2017, 2018) ===
==== Death Crew Council (2016–2017) ====
Kingston was revealed as a member of the masked gang Death Crew Council (DCC) on November 10, 2016, episode of Impact. The DCC made their Impact Zone debut on October 20 episode of Impact Wrestling, when they attacked The Tribunal, following the latter's loss to TNA World Tag Team Champions, The Broken Hardys. The DCC continued their assault on TNA wrestlers, attacking Robbie E and Grado on October 27 episode of Impact Wrestling. On November 3 episode of Impact Wrestling, the DCC attacked the Tag Champions. As the faction was leaving, the Hardys challenged them to an immediate match and put their titles on the line; whether this was a handicap match or not and what its official result was have never been specified. The match devolved into a backstage fight during which Matt Hardy suffered amnesia after being knocked off a forklift by one of the DCC members. The DCC unmasked themselves on the following episode of Impact Wrestling after laying out TNA World Heavyweight Champion Eddie Edwards following his successful title defense against Eli Drake. On November 17 episode of Impact Wrestling, Kingston made his Impact in-ring debut teaming with Storm and Bram to defeat Edwards and Brother Nero in a No Disqualification 3-on-2 handicap match. On December 1 episode of Impact Wrestling, Kingston and Bram faced The Broken Hardys for the TNA Tag Team Championship, but were ultimately defeated.

Bram and Kingston would face Decay in a losing effort, after James Storm attacked Abyss, resulting in a disqualification. At Genesis, the DCC were defeated by Decay and The Broken Hardys in a three-way tag team, thus not winning their TNA World Tag Team Championship. On January 19 episode of Impact Wrestling, Bram and Kingston competed in the first ever Race for the Case, capturing the yellow briefcase when Kingston knocked it out of Jessie Godderz's hands and into Bram's, later learning they have the #2 call out spot for the February 2 Open Fight Night episode of Impact Wrestling. On February 2 episode of Impact Wrestling, the DCC used their Race for the Case briefcase to call out and defeat Decay in a Fall Count Anywhere match. At the end of the show, they would attack Ethan Carter III after his match against Eli Drake, only to attack him and his bodyguard Tyrus after. On February 9 episode of Impact Wrestling, the DCC defeated Eli Drake and Tyrus in a handicap match. On April 6 episode of Impact Wrestling, Kingston and Bram interrupted James Storm kicking him out of the DCC after Kingston spat in Storm’s face and Storm laid both guys out with superkicks. Kingston would return to Global Force Wrestling, which he was involved in a 20-man Gauntlet for the Gold match for the vacated Impact World Championship which he was unsuccessful. In October 2017, Kingston announced his departure from Impact Wrestling.

==== Latin American Xchange; OGz (2018) ====
On May 24, 2018, episode of Impact, Kingston, now renamed "King", returned as a member of the Latin American Xchange (LAX). After the group leader Konnan was attacked, and Homicide and Diamante went missing in action, King assumed leadership of the faction and guided Ortiz and Santana back to being Impact World Tag Team Champions. In June, Konnan and Diamante returned, both showing suspicion about King's involvement with the group. On July 5 episode of Impact, King confirmed that he had been behind the attack on Konnan, before former LAX members Homicide and Hernandez returned and attacked LAX, joining forces with King. The group later became known as the "OGz". At the Bound for Glory in October 2018, the OGz lost to LAX in a Concrete Jungle Death match. Kingston subsequently left Impact Wrestling once more.

=== National Wrestling Alliance (2019–2020) ===
Kingston debuted for the National Wrestling Alliance (NWA) at their television tapings on September 30 for NWA Powerr. At the tapings he reunited with Homicide as Outlaw Inc., feuding with The Wilds Cards (Thom Latimer and Royce Isaacs) and The Dawsons (Dave and Zane Dawson) over the NWA World Tag Team Championship.

=== All Elite Wrestling / Return to ROH (2020–present) ===
==== Championship pursuits (2020–2021) ====
Kingston made his debut for All Elite Wrestling (AEW) on July 22, 2020, episode of Dynamite, where he faced against Cody for the AEW TNT Championship in a No Disqualification match, but lost. On July 31, it was announced that Kingston had signed a contract with AEW. On August 22 episode of Dynamite, Kingston created an alliance with The Butcher and The Blade and the Lucha Brothers (Pentagón Jr. and Rey Fénix). At the All Out pay-per-view, Kingston participated in the Casino Battle Royale, where he was lastly eliminated by eventual winner Lance Archer. Despite this, Kingston would claim that he was never eliminated from the match as he went under the bottom rope and began touting for an AEW World Championship match. On September 23 episode of Dynamite, Kingston received his AEW World Championship match against his former friend Jon Moxley, where he was defeated after passing out to a chokehold. Kingston would later attack Moxley after the latter's match with Lance Archer on October 14 episode of Dynamite, protesting that Moxley had never made him submit. Due to this, an "I Quit" match between the two was set up for the Full Gear event on November 7, which Kingston lost.

On November 18 episode of Dynamite, the Lucha Brothers turned on Kingston after he and Butcher and Blade attacked Pac. At New Year's Smash on January 13, 2021, Kingston was defeated by Pac. At Revolution on March 7, Kingston rescued Jon Moxley after Moxley's main event match against Kenny Omega, turning face in the process. The two would later resume their friendship and begin an alliance. Furthermore, Kingston would end his association with The Butcher and The Blade, after they were hired by Matt Hardy as part of his entourage. Over the next weeks, Kingston and Moxley feuded with Omega, as well as his allies The Good Brothers (Doc Gallows and Karl Anderson) and The Young Bucks (Matt Jackson and Nick Jackson). At the Double or Nothing event on May 30, Kingston and Moxley challenged The Young Bucks for the AEW World Tag Team Championship, but were defeated. After Moxley took an absence for the birth of his first child, Kingston allied with Pentagón Jr. to face The Young Bucks for the championship in a Street Fight at the Road Rager event, but they were defeated. Kingston eventually began a feud with Miro, whom he challenged for the TNT Championship at All Out, though he was defeated.

After his loss to Miro at All Out, he participated in an eight-man, single elimination tournament for an opportunity for the AEW World Championship, where he would be eliminated in the semi-finals by Bryan Danielson.

==== Various feuds (2021–2023) ====
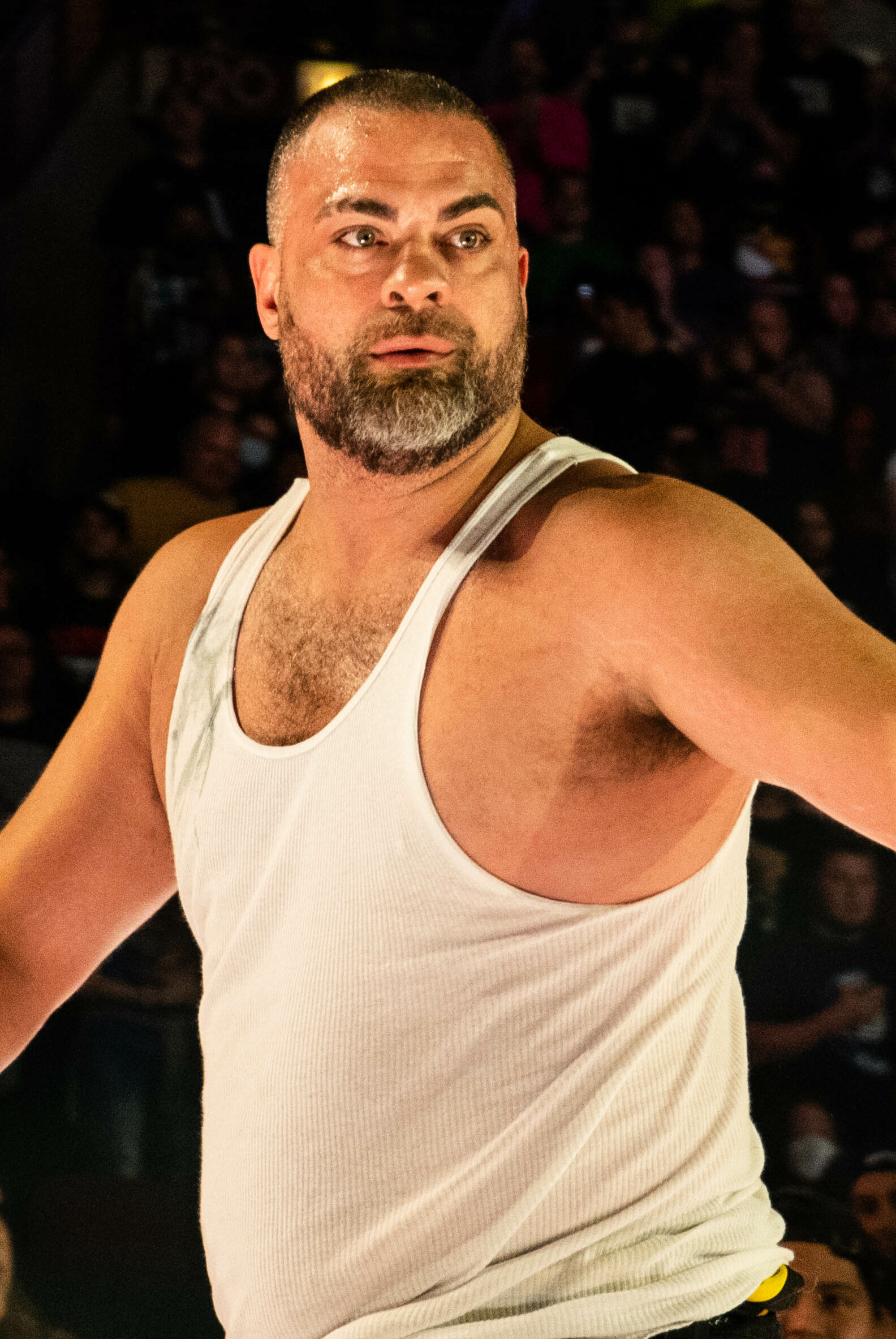
Kingston in June 2022

Immediately following his loss to Danielson, he would interrupt an interview segment with CM Punk, beginning a feud between the two of them. Kingston would face Punk at the Full Gear event in November, but lost. The following month, Kingston would initiate a rivalry with Chris Jericho, but suffered an orbital bone injury in January 2022, temporarily sidelining him. The rivalry would continue after Kingston returned the following month, with the two agreeing that they would wrestle each other at the Revolution event. At Revolution on March 6, Kingston defeated Jericho by submission, his first victory at an AEW pay-per-view event. Soon after, Jericho would attack his former friends Santana and Ortiz and form the villainous Jericho Appreciation Society and continue to feud with Kingston, Santana, and Ortiz as well as the Blackpool Combat Club. The Jericho Appreciation Society went on to win the Anarchy in the Arena match at Double or Nothing. Kingston, Santana, Ortiz, and the Blackpool Combat Club would avenge this loss with a win at Blood and Guts. At Fyter Fest on July 20, Kingston was defeated by Jericho in a Barbed Wire Everywhere Deathmatch.

After this, Kingston began a feud with Jericho's ally Sammy Guevara. The two were scheduled to face in a match at the All Out, but the match was cancelled after Kingston was suspended by AEW for getting into a legitimate backstage dispute with Guevara. Instead, Kingston faced Tomohiro Ishii on the All Out pre-show in a winning effort. He resumed his feud with Guevara shortly after, with the two facing in a match on Rampage: Grand Slam; Kingston initially won by submission, but the decision was overturned after he refused to release his submission hold.

At Full Gear on November 19, Kingston defeated Jun Akiyama. After losing the Face of the Revolution ladder match on March 1, 2023, edition of Dynamite, during an interview with Lexy Nair, Kingston was asked what was going on with him, Kingston, who had already packed his bags, said "I quit AEW", and then walked out the nearest door.

==== American Triple Crown Champion (2023–2024) ====
After Tony Khan purchased Ring of Honor, Kingston began to work on the promotion, challenging ROH World Champion Claudio Castagnoli for the title. He was defeated at Supercard of Honor. On June 15, 2023, episode of Dynamite, Kingston returned to AEW, laying out Wheeler Yuta and bitter enemy Claudio Castagnoli, before being stopped by Jon Moxley. Kingston was attacked from behind by Konosuke Takeshita. At the Forbidden Door event on June 25, Kingston teamed with Adam Page, The Young Bucks and Tomohiro Ishii to take on Moxley, Yuta, Castagnoli, Takeshita and Shota Umino in a ten-man tag team match, which they won.

Following Forbidden Door, Eddie was in Japan to participate in G1 Climax 33, while also winning the NJPW Strong Openweight Championship. (See the section on New Japan below.) During one of his off-days, NJPW staff brought him by surprise to the Ramen shop operated by Kingston's idol, Toshiaki Kawada. The two spoke at length, both off and on camera, with Kingston stating "Sitting down with him and some of the things I told him offscreen and some the things he told me offscreen, I will hold forever dear...[the advice he gave me] was translated to me and sent to me; I read it every day." Kawada also suggested that Eddie cease using the Northern Lights Bomb as his finisher, recommending a powerbomb instead. The two continued their discussion at Starrcast that year, in a conversation translated by Sonny Oono.

Kingston continued to feud with The Blackpool Combat Club, due to his hatred for Castagnoli, leading to him teaming with their common enemies, Pentagón Jr., Best Friends (Chuck Taylor and Trent Beretta) and Orange Cassidy to face off against BCC (Moxley, Castagnoli and Yuta) and the recently reunited Santana and Ortiz, at All In on August 27 in a Stadium Stampede match. At the event, Kingston's team was victorious. The following week at All Out, Kingston teamed with ROH Pure Champion Katsuyori Shibata to face off against Castagnoli and Yuta, in a losing effort. Kingston and Castagnoli finally faced off on September 20 at Dynamite: Grand Slam, in a title vs title match for Castagnoli's ROH World Championship and Kingston's NJPW Strong Openweight Championship, where Kingston defeated Castagnoli via powerbomb, becoming a double champion. Following the match, the two men adhered to the Code of Honor, shaking hands thus ending the two men's 15+ year rivalry.

Kingston announced his participation in the Continental Classic and that his ROH World Championship and NJPW Strong Openweight Championship on the line in the tournament final. Kingston lost both of his initial matches, and had to win all of his remaining bouts to avoid mathematical elimination. In the League Finals at Dynamite: New Year's Smash, Kingston defeated Danielson for the first time to clinch the Blue League Finals, while Jon Moxley won the Gold League Finals, setting up the Championship Finale at Worlds End. At the event, Kingston defeated Moxley for the first time in his career, retaining both the ROH World Championship and NJPW Strong Openweight Championship while also becoming the inaugural holder of the AEW Continental Championship. As a result, he was dubbed the inaugural "American Triple Crown Champion" (also referred to as the Continental Crown Champion) for holding all three titles. On March 3, 2024, at Revolution, Kingston successfully defended his titles against Bryan Danielson. On March 20 episode of Dynamite, Kingston lost the Continental Championship to Kazuchika Okada. At Supercard of Honor, Kingston lost the ROH World Championship to Mark Briscoe.

Kingston was originally scheduled to team with FTR (Cash Wheeler and Dax Harwood) and Bryan Danielson as Team AEW in an Anarchy in the Arena match against The Elite (Kazuchika Okada, Matthew Jackson, Nicholas Jackson, and Jack Perry) at Double or Nothing in May 2024, but was replaced by Darby Allin due to a severe leg injury; he was theorized to be out of action until at least May 2025 after suffering a fractured tibia, torn ACL, and torn meniscus. During his time away, he made one appearance in a pre-recorded promo from his home on August 17 episode of Collision, discussing the upcoming championship vs. career match between Strickland and Danielson at All In.

==== Return from injury (2025–present) ====
Kingston returned from injury at All Out on September 20, 2025, defeating Big Bill. After the match, he was attacked by Bill and Bryan Keith, only to be saved by Hook. He formed a tag team with Hook and they went on to defeat Bill and Keith on September 27 episode of Collision in a tornado tag team match. The team would quickly disband as Hook would turn heel and rejoin his former group The Opps (Samoa Joe, Powerhouse Hobbs, and Katsuyori Shibata) at Full Gear on November 22. On December 10 at Dynamite: Winter is Coming, Kingston unsuccessfully challenged Joe for the AEW World Championship. At Worlds End Zero Hour on December 27, Kingston defeated Zack Gibson. After the match, Kingston was attacked by Gibson and his Grizzled Young Veterans tag team partner James Drake, only to be saved by a returning Ortiz.

On February 7, 2026, episode of Collision, Kingston, Ortiz and The Rascalz (Dezmond Xavier and Zachary Wentz) defeated the Grizzled Young Veterans, Big Bill, and Bryan Keith in an eight-man Parking Lot Brawl, ending their feud. In August 2026, Kingston competed in the inaugural Continental Challenge Cup and defeated Jake Doyle in the first round before withdrawing from the tournament due to an undisclosed injury.

=== New Japan Pro-Wrestling (2021–present) ===
Kingston made his debut for New Japan Pro-Wrestling (NJPW) on November 27, 2021, episode of Strong, teaming with Jon Moxley to face Minoru Suzuki and Lance Archer in a Philadelphia Street Fight, in a losing effort. On January 8, 2022, episode of Strong, Kingston returned to defeat Gabriel Kidd. At the Capital Collision event in May 2022, Kingston faced Tomohiro Ishii, but was defeated. On February 18, 2023, at Battle in the Valley, Kingston would defeat Jay White in a Loser Leaves NJPW match.

On May 21 at NJPW Resurgence, Kingston issued a challenge to whoever is the Strong Openweight Champion between Kenta and Hikuleo. On June 6, at Dominion 6.4 in Osaka-jo Hall, Kingston was announced as participant in the upcoming G1 Climax. Before the start of the tournament, on July 5's night 2 of Independence Day, Kingston defeated Kenta to become the Strong Openweight Champion. Upon the start of the tournament, Kingston competed in the C Block, finishing with 8 points, failing to advance to the quarterfinal round. Following the tournament, on August 12, after Kingston was victorious in an eight-man tag team match, Henare came to the ring and subsequently attacked Kingston, before motioning toward his Strong Openweight Championship belt. The following day, after an eight-man tag team match, Kingston returned the favour and attacked HENARE. The two brawled to the back, where Kingston suggested they face each other for the title at Fighting Spirit Unleashed on October 28. Kingston retained in their match, and also defending his NJPW title against Rocky Romero, Katsuyori Shibata, and Minoru Suzuki on American television.

After the Continental Classic in AEW, the NJPW Strong belt became part of the "American Triple Crown," though Gabe Kidd insisted that he only wanted the Strong Belt during the run-up to Battle in the Valley. Kingston retained via double count-out, and later in the show came out to help Will Ospreay fight off an attack from Bullet Club. He was later defeated by Kidd in a No Ropes Last Man Standing match on May 11 at Resurgence, failing to retain the championship, ending his reign at 311 days. Afterwards, he was attacked by The Elite (Matthew Jackson, Nicholas Jackson and Jack Perry), with whom he was feuding in AEW.

=== Consejo Mundial de Lucha Libre (2026) ===
On August 28, 2026, Kingston made his debut for Consejo Mundial de Lucha Libre (CMLL), where he unsuccessfully challenged Hechicero for the CMLL World Heavyweight Championship at Arena México.

== Championships and accomplishments ==
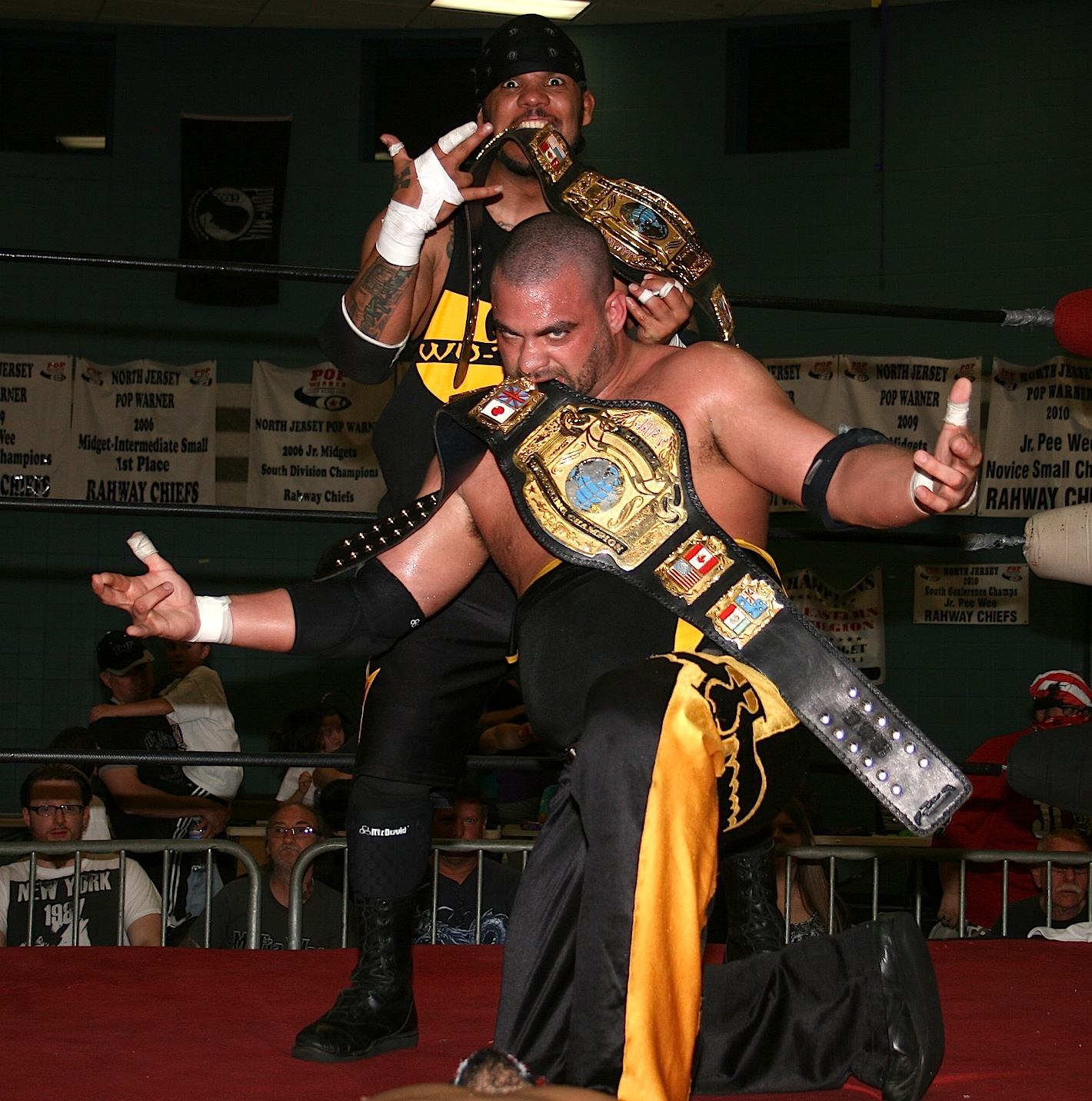
Kingston and Homicide as the JAPW Tag Team Champions in April 2012

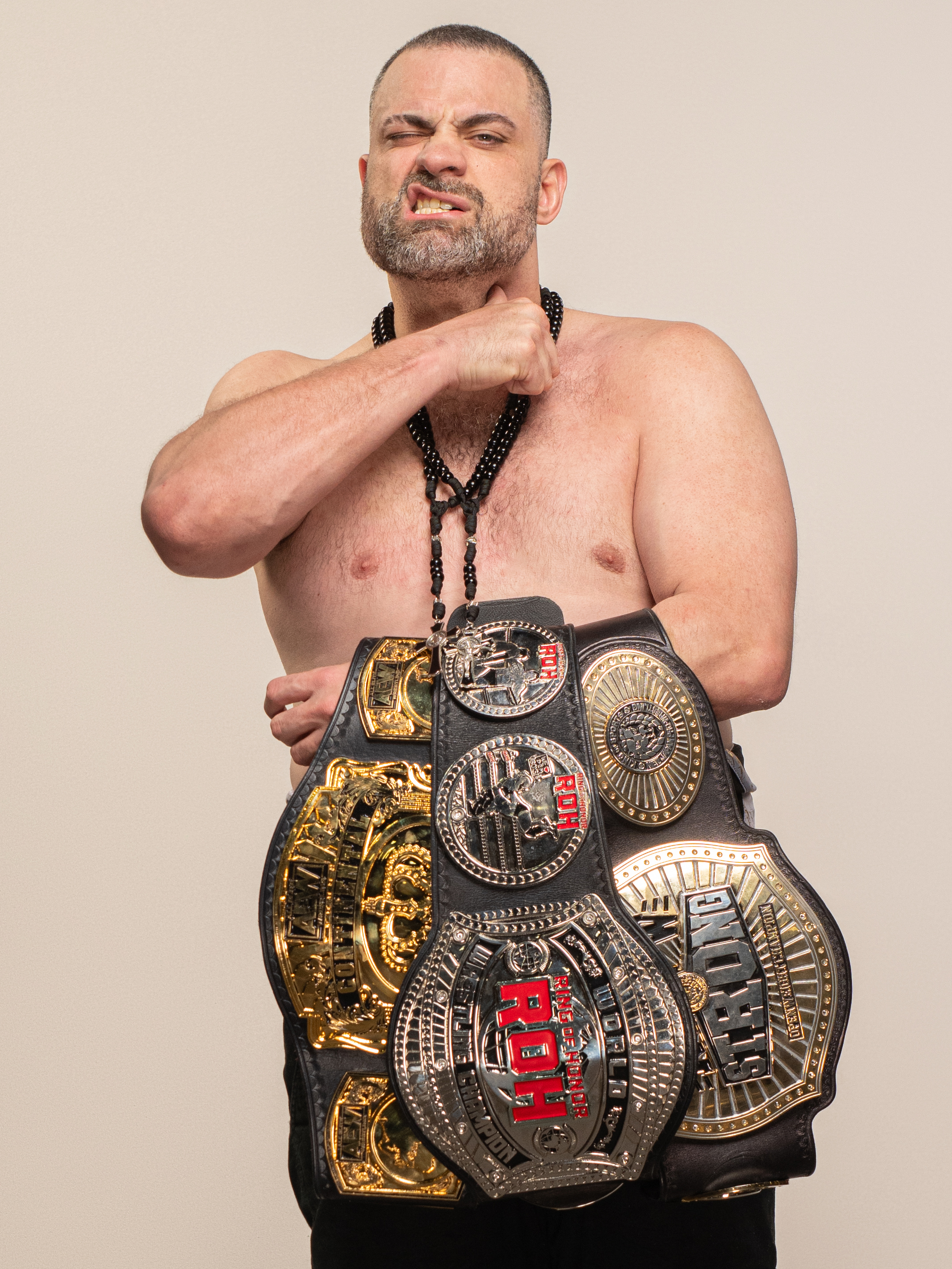
In 2023, Kingston held the AEW Continental Championship, ROH World Championship, and Strong Openweight Championship, defending all three simultaneously as the singular Continental Crown Championship

- Absolute Intense Wrestling
  - Gauntlet for the Gold (2019)
- All American Wrestling / AAW: Professional Wrestling Redefined
  - AAW Heavyweight Championship (2 times)
  - AAW Tag Team Championship (1 time) – with David Starr and Jeff Cobb
- American Championship Entertainment
  - ACE Diamond Division Championship (1 time)
- All Elite Wrestling
  - AEW Continental Championship (1 time, inaugural)
  - Continental Classic (2023)
- CBS Sports
  - Rookie of the Year (2020)
  - Smack Talker of the Year (2020)
- Chikara
  - Chikara Grand Championship (1 time, inaugural)
  - 12 Large: Summit (2011)
  - Torneo Cibernetico (2010)
- Combat Zone Wrestling
  - CZW World Heavyweight Championship (1 time)
  - CZW World Tag Team Championship (2 times) – with Joker (1) and Drake Younger (1)
- DDT Pro-Wrestling
  - Ironman Heavymetalweight Championship (1 time)
- EGO Pro Wrestling
  - EPW Heavyweight Championship (1 time)
- Evolve
  - Evolve Tag Team Championship (1 time) – with Joe Gacy
- Glory Pro
  - Crown of Glory Championship (1 time)
- Independent Wrestling Association Mid-South
  - IWA Mid-South Heavyweight Championship (1 time)
  - IWA Mid-South Tag Team Championship (2 times) – with BlackJack Marciano (1) and Homicide (1)
  - Revolution Strong Style Tournament (2006)
- Jersey All Pro Wrestling
  - JAPW New Jersey State Championship (1 time)
  - JAPW Tag Team Championship (1 time, final) – with Homicide
- Maven Bentley Association
  - MBA Tag Team Championship (1 time) – with Sabian
  - MBA Tag Team Championship Tournament (2005) – with Sabian
- New Japan Pro-Wrestling
  - Strong Openweight Championship (1 time)
- Outlaw Wrestling
  - Outlaw Wrestling Tag Team Championship (1 time, current) – with Ortiz
- Pro Wrestling Illustrated
  - Ranked No. 20 of the top 500 singles wrestlers in the PWI 500 in 2024
- Ring of Honor
  - ROH World Championship (1 time)
- Sports Illustrated
  - Ranked No. 10 of the top 10 wrestlers in 2020
- Top Rope Promotions
  - TRP Heavyweight Championship (1 time)
- Wrestling Observer Newsletter
  - Best on Interviews (2020, 2023)
  - Feud of the Year (2020) vs. Jon Moxley
- World Star Wrestling Federation
  - WSWF Heavyweight Championship (1 time)
- Other titles
  - ICW/ICWA Tex-Arkana Television Championship (1 time)

== Luchas de Apuestas record ==
Winner (wager)	Loser (wager)	Location	Event	Date	Notes
Gran Akuma (mask)	Eddie Kingston and BlackJack Marciano (hair)	Emmaus, Pennsylvania	Aniversario 3: Dodging the Sophomore Jinx	May 22, 2004	(Note: This was a six man tag team match, where The Toxic Trio (Kingston, Marciano and Jigsaw) faced Akuma, Icarus and Mike Quackenbush with Kingston's, Marciano's and Icarus' hairs, Akuma's and Jigsaw's masks and Quackenbush's six championship belts on the line.)

== See also ==
- Professional wrestling in Puerto Rico
