= List of Total Nonstop Action Wrestling tournaments =

Total Nonstop Action Wrestling (TNA) has held a variety of professional wrestling tournaments competed for by wrestlers that are a part of their roster.

== Sporadic tournaments ==
=== NWA World Tag Team Championship Tournament (2002) ===
The NWA World Tag Team Championships tournament was held to crown new NWA World Tag Team Champions after Jeff and Jerry Jarrett formed NWA:Total Nonstop Action (NWA:TNA) to control/feature the NWA Worlds Heavyweight Championship and the NWA World Tag Team Championship as their championships. AJ Styles and Jerry Lynn won the tournament to become the first NWA World Tag Team Championships in TNA.

Semifinals
1	Chris Harris and James Storm	Pin
4	Mike Shane and Todd Shane	4:42
3	Bruce and Lane	Pin
2	Buff Bagwell and Gran Apolo	5:49

Finals
AJ Styles and Jerry Lynn(*)	Pin
Bruce and Lenny	12:23

AJ Styles and Jerry Lynn were a last minute replacement for James Storm and Chris Harris who were attacked backstage.

=== NWA World Heavyweight Championship #1 Contenders Tournament (2002) ===
An 8-man tournament was held to crown a #1 contender for the NWA Worlds Heavyweight Championship which was held at the time by Ron Killings. Jeff Jarrett won the tournament and would later win the championship.

Quarterfinals
Syxx-Pac	Pin
Brian Lawler	5:02
BG James	Pin
Ron Harris	5:37
Jeff Jarrett	Pin
Curt Hennig	1:13
Sonny Siaki	Pin
Jerry Lynn	15:01

Semifinals
Jeff Jarrett	Forfeit
Sean Waltman	0:00
BG James	Pin
Sonny Siaki	7:07

Final
Jeff Jarrett	Pin
BG James	7:18

=== TNA Hard 10 Tournament ===
The TNA Hard 10 Tournament was a hardcore tournament for a trophy that would proclaim the winner the most hardcore wrestler in TNA. It featured eight wrestlers competing in matches where a point-scoring system was used to determine the winner. The system was that 1 point was awarded for a direct hit with an object and 5 points for putting your opponent through a table, with 10 points needed to win. The only tournament was held in 2003, which was won by The Sandman.

Quarterfinals
Mike Sanders	Pts
Brian Lee	10
New Jack	Pts
Slash	18
Sonny Siaki	Pts
Vampire Warrior	12
The Sandman	Pts
Devon Storm	11

Semifinals
Mike Sanders	10
New Jack	Pts
Sonny Siaki	11
The Sandman	Pts

Final
New Jack	12
The Sandman	Pts

=== TNA Anarchy Alliance Tag Team Tournament ===
The TNA Anarchy Alliance Tag Team Tournament was a tag team tournament held in 2003 to determine the number one contenders for the NWA World Tag Team Championship, which was won by America's Most Wanted (Chris Harris and James Storm).

Quarterfinals
Ron Killings and Don Harris	Pin
New Jack and Shark Boy	3:11
David Young and Traci	Pin
Kid Kash and Trinity	7:47
Konnan and BG James	Pin
The Sandman and Sonny Siaki	2:40
Chris Harris and James Storm	Pin
Justin Credible and Jerry Lynn	9:04

Semifinals
Ron Killings and Don Harris	6:53
David Young and Traci	Pin
Konnan and BG James	5:28
Chris Harris and James Storm	Pin

Final
David Young and Traci	6:41
Chris Harris and James Storm	Pin

=== NWA World Tag Team Championship Tournament (2004) ===
The NWA World Tag Team Championship Tournament was a tag team tournament held in 2004 in order to crown new NWA World Tag Team Champions, which was won by Kid Kash and Dallas.

Quarterfinals
Christopher Daniels and Low Ki	Pin
Shane Douglas and Michael Shane
The Naturals (Andy Douglas and Chase Stevens)	Pin
3Live Kru (Konnan and BG James)
Slash and Sinn	Pin
Glenn Gilbertti and David Young
Kid Kash and Dallas	Pin
Simon Diamond and Sonny Siaki

Semifinals
Christopher Daniels and Low Ki	Pin
The Naturals (Andy Douglas and Chase Stevens)
Slash and Sinn
Kid Kash and Dallas	Pin

Final
Christopher Daniels and Low Ki
Kid Kash and Dallas	Pin

=== NWA World Heavyweight Championship #1 Contender Tournament (2004) ===
The NWA World Heavyweight Championship Number One Contender Tournament was a 4-man tournament held in October 2004 in order to crown new number one contender for the NWA World Heavyweight Championship at TNA's first-ever monthly pay-per-view event Victory Road.

Semifinals
1	Raven	11:43
4	Monty Brown	Pin
3	Abyss	8:08
2	Jeff Hardy	Pin

Final
Monty Brown	Pin
Jeff Hardy	9:16

=== X Cup Tournaments ===
The TNA X Cup Tournaments are X Division tournaments that feature various wrestlers and/or Teams from around the World. So far, there have been two Super X Cup Tournaments, one America's X Cup Tournament, and three World X Cup Tournaments.

=== Fight for the Right Tournament ===
The Fight for the Right Tournament was a tournament to determine the number one contender for the NWA World Heavyweight Championship and later for the TNA World Heavyweight Championship.

=== Paparazzi Championship Series ===
The Paparazzi Championship Series was a tournament that began at Turning Point 2006 and involved five X Division competitors competing in a variety of matches where points are awarded for victories. These matches included limbo, Texas hold 'em, musical chairs, and a push-up contest, among others. The tournament was created to give the wrestlers airtime while also continuing the Paparazzi Productions storyline surrounding Austin Starr, Alex Shelley and Kevin Nash. Throughout the competitions, Nash kept bringing up Bob Backlund, which led up to Backlund being a guest judge at Final Resolution 2007 during the finals of the competition. Shelley defeated Starr in the finals to win a bowling trophy presented by Nash at Final Resolution 2007. The other three participants in the tournament were Sonjay Dutt, Jay Lethal and Senshi. Nash viciously needled the other three (especially Dutt) throughout the challenge, but kept the actual competition fair and even, always inviting the losers of each contest to "feel free to kiss the winner".

=== Deuces Wild Tag Team Tournament ===
The Deuces Wild Tag Team Tournament was held during April and May 2008 for the vacant TNA World Tag Team Championship. It took place on TNA Impact! and at Sacrifice on May 11, 2008. It was announced on the April 24, 2008 episode of Impact! by Management Director Jim Cornette. It involved twelve teams overall.

=== TNA X Division Championship Tournament (2009) ===
The tournament was the result of a match for the TNA X Division Championship at Final Resolution between Eric Young and Sheik Abdul Bashir ending in a controversial fashion, with Young winning the championship thanks to the referee's help. Management Director Jim Cornette stripped Young of the belt and announced the tournament to crown the new champion. The tournament final took place at Genesis.

=== Team 3D Invitational Tag Team Tournament ===
To reinvigorate the tag team division, Team 3D (Brother Ray and Brother Devon) announced on the April 23, 2009 episode of Impact! that they would be hosting a tag team tournament. The winning team would receive a trophy, a check for $100,000 and a match for the TNA World Tag Team Championship (held by Team 3D). The tournament started that same night and matches would be held over the next few weeks and TNA announced that the finals would be held at the Sacrifice pay-per-view.

=== TNA Knockouts Tag Team Championship Tournament (2009) ===
TNA announced a Knockouts tag team tournament for the new TNA Knockouts Tag Team Championship on the August 20, 2009 episode of TNA Impact!. Round one matches started on the August 27, 2009 episode of TNA Impact!.

=== TNA World Heavyweight Championship #1 Contenders Tournament (2009) ===
On the September 3, 2009 episode of Impact!, a two-bracket one-night tournament was held to determine two competitors that would face Matt Morgan and Kurt Angle for the TNA World Heavyweight Championship at No Surrender. Sting won the first bracket, and AJ Styles won the second bracket.

Semifinals
AJ Styles	Pin
Chris Sabin	5:30
Doug Williams	Pin
Suicide	5:55
Hernandez	Pin
Homicide	3:55
Sting	Pin
Rhino	3:30

Finals
AJ Styles	Pin
Doug Williams	7:15
Sting	pin
Hernandez	2:05

=== TNA Championship Series ===
The TNA Championship Series took place on the Thanksgiving Day edition of Impact! on November 26, 2009. The winner of the tournament would earn himself a shot at the Championship of his own division. However, the winner of the tournament, Bobby Lashley, did not receive his title match.

Participants:

- Abyss (Heavyweight Division)
- Bobby Lashley (Heavyweight Division)
- Desmond Wolfe (Heavyweight Division)
- Suicide (X Division)
- Kurt Angle (Heavyweight Division)
- D'Angelo Dinero (Heavyweight Division)
- Homicide (X Division)
- Robert Roode (Tag Team Division)

Quarterfinals
Abyss
Bobby Lashley	Sub
Desmond Wolfe	Pin
Suicide
Kurt Angle	Pin
D'Angelo Dinero
Homicide
Robert Roode	Pin

Semifinals
Bobby Lashley	DQ
Desmond Wolfe
Kurt Angle
Robert Roode	Count-out

Final
Bobby Lashley	Pin
Robert Roode

=== New Year's Knockout Eve Tournament ===
The New Year's Knockout Eve Tournament took place on the December 31, 2009, edition of Impact!. The winner of the tournament would earn a shot at the TNA Women's Knockout Championship on the live three-hour Monday night edition of Impact! on January 4, 2010.

Quarterfinals
Madison Rayne	Pin
Hamada	04:25
Velvet Sky	Pin
Roxxi	02:13
Traci Brooks	Pin
ODB	04:16
Daffney	Pin
Awesome Kong	03:30

Semifinals
Hamada	Pin
Roxxi	07:49
ODB	Pin
Awesome Kong	09:41

Final
Hamada	Pin
ODB	14:34

=== 8 Card Stud Tournament ===
The 8 Card Stud Tournament took place on February 14, 2010, at the Against All Odds pay-per-view and its winner would get to challenge the TNA World Heavyweight Champion in the main event of April's Lockdown pay-per-view.

=== TNA Tag Team Championship Series ===
On the June 17, 2010, edition of Impact! TNA vacated the TNA World Tag Team Championship and announced a two-week-long tournament, with the winners facing The Motor City Machine Guns (Alex Shelley and Chris Sabin), who were the number one contenders prior to the titles being vacated, for the titles at Victory Road.

=== TNA World Tag Team Championship #1 Contenders Tournament (2010) ===
On the August 4, 2010, edition of TNA Xplosion, TNA announced a two-week-long tournament to determine the number one contenders to the TNA World Tag Team Championship.

Teams:

- Desmond Wolfe and Magnus
- Generation Me (Max and Jeremy Buck)
- Hernandez and Rob Terry
- Ink Inc. (Jesse Neal and Shannon Moore)

Semifinals
Hernandez and Rob Terry	Pin
Desmond Wolfe and Magnus
Generation Me	Pin
Ink Inc.

Finals
Desmond Wolfe and Magnus	Pin
Ink Inc.

=== TNA World Heavyweight Championship Tournament (2010) ===
On the August 19, 2010, edition of TNA Impact!, the TNA World Heavyweight Championship was vacated, after champion Rob Van Dam suffered a storyline injury. The title was put up in a tournament featuring the top eight ranked wrestlers in the TNA Championship Committee rankings. The finals of the tournament would take place at Bound for Glory on October 10.

=== TNA Knockouts Tag Team Championship Tournament (2010) ===
On the December 9, 2010, edition of Impact! TNA vacated the TNA Knockouts Tag Team Championship, after one half of the previous champions, Hamada, had been released by the promotion, and set up a four–team tournament to determine new champions. The finals of the tournament would take place on the December 23 edition of Impact!.

Semifinals; TNA Impact! (December 6 and 7, 2010)
The Beautiful People (Angelina Love and Velvet Sky)	Pin
Daffney and Sarita	04:00
Madison Rayne and Tara	Pin
Mickie James and Miss Tessmacher	04:00

Finals; TNA Impact! (December 9, 2010)
Angelina Love and Winter*	Pin
Madison Rayne and Tara	05:00

*Winter replaced Velvet Sky, who had been attacked backstage by Sarita.

=== TNA X Division Championship #1 Contender Tournament (2011) ===
On the January 27, 2011, edition of Impact!, TNA started a tournament to determine a new number one contender for the TNA X Division Championship, held by Kazarian. The tournament consisted of three three–way semifinal matches, taking place on the January 27, February 3 and February 10 editions of Impact!, with the finals, another three–way match, taking place at Against All Odds on February 13. The finals ended with a double countout, after Jeremy and Max Buck failed to make it to the event due to travel issues.

=== Xplosion Championship Challenge ===
On the May 24, 2011, edition of TNA Xplosion, Desmond Wolfe was announced as the new Xplosion Commissioner. His first act as commissioner was setting up a tournament exclusive to Xplosion where the winner would receive a title shot against any active champion in TNA. The finals of the tournament took place at the August 9 tapings of the August 24 edition of Xplosion.

First round
D'Angelo Dinero	Pin
Suicide
Okada
Alex Shelley	Pin
Hernandez	Pin
Max Buck
Douglas Williams	Pin
Amazing Red
Magnus	Pin
Orlando Jordan
Shannon Moore	Pin
Jeremy Buck
Robbie E
Crimson	Pin
Anarquia
Devon	Pin

Quarterfinals
D'Angelo Dinero
Alex Shelley	Pin
Hernandez
Douglas Williams	Pin
Magnus	Pin
Shannon Moore
Crimson	Draw
Devon

Semifinals
Alex Shelley	Pin
Douglas Williams
Magnus	Bye

Finals
Alex Shelley
Magnus	Pin

=== X Division Showcase ===
On the June 16, 2011, edition of Impact Wrestling, TNA started a twelve-man tournament for a contract in the promotion's X Division. The finals of the tournament would take place on July 10 at Destination X.

First round

- Austin Aries defeated Jimmy Rave and Kid Kash (Impact Wrestling, June 16, 2011)
- Zema Ion defeated Dakota Darsow and Federico Palacios (Impact Wrestling, June 23, 2011)
- Low Ki defeated Jimmy Yang and Matt Bentley (Impact Wrestling, June 30, 2011)
- Jack Evans defeated Jesse Sorensen and Tony Nese (Impact Wrestling, July 7, 2011)

Finals

- Austin Aries defeated Jack Evans, Low Ki and Zema Ion (Destination X, July 10, 2011)

=== Maximum Impact Tournament ===
On November 23, 2011, TNA announced the start of the Maximum Impact Tournament, an eight-man tournament, which would take place on Xplosion. The winner would receive a shot at the TNA World Heavyweight Championship during TNA's tour of the United Kingdom in January 2012. The finals of the tournament took place on December 13 at the tapings of the January 4, 2012, edition of Xplosion. The winner, Samoa Joe, received his title shot on January 27 in Manchester, in a match taped for Xplosion, but was defeated by the defending TNA World Heavyweight Champion, Bobby Roode.

Quarterfinals
Christopher Daniels	Pin
Eric Young
Devon	Pin
Rob Terry
Samoa Joe	Sub
Douglas Williams
Kazarian	Pin
Magnus

Semifinals
Christopher Daniels	Pin
Devon
Samoa Joe	Pin
Kazarian

Finals
Christopher Daniels
Samoa Joe	Pin

=== Wild Card Tournament ===
On the December 15, 2011, edition of Impact Wrestling, TNA started a tag team tournament to determine the number one contenders for the TNA World Tag Team Championship, held by the team Crimson and Matt Morgan, at Genesis. The pairings were, in storyline, decided by a random draw.

=== TNA X Division Championship Tournament (2012) ===
On the June 28, 2012, episode of Impact Wrestling, TNA announced a tournament for the TNA X Division Championship, which would take place at Destination X, where Austin Aries would vacate the title for a shot at the TNA World Heavyweight Championship. The tournament was preceded by four qualifying matches featuring wrestlers from the independent circuit. TNA contracted wrestlers Douglas Williams, Kid Kash and Zema Ion were given automatic spots in the first round of the tournament. The eighth and final spot in the tournament would be filled by the winner of a four-way between the losers of the qualifying matches. At Destination X the eight wrestlers will face each other in four singles matches, with the winners advancing to an Ultimate X match for the X Division Championship.

=== TNA X Division Championship #1 Contender Tournament (2013) ===
On the January 3, 2013, edition of Impact! TNA started a tournament to determine a new number one contender for the TNA X Division Championship, held by Rob Van Dam. The tournament consisted of two singles semifinal matches, taking place on the January 3 and January 10 editions of Impact!, with the finals taking place at Genesis on January 13.

=== TNA Gut Check Tournament (2013) ===
The TNA Gut Check Tournament was a 4-man tournament held from May 9 thru June 2, 2013 in order to determine which TNA Gut Check competitor would compete in the Bound for Glory Series the finals of the tournament took place at Slammiversary XI. Sam Shaw advanced to the finals of the tournament after Silva was no longer able to compete.

=== Jokers Wild Tag Team Tournament ===
On the July 11, 2013 edition of Impact a tournament was held where the twelve Bound for Glory Series participants were randomly paired up into six tag teams. There were then three tag matches with the winning teams advancing to a six-man Gauntlet Battle Royal. Once there were two competitors left in the match, the match became a regular singles match with the winner earning 25 points in the Bound for Glory Series.

First round
Jeff Hardy and Joseph Park
AJ Styles and Samoa Joe	Sub
Jay Bradley and Hernandez
Mr. Anderson and Magnus	Pin
Christopher Daniels and Austin Aries
Bobby Roode and Kazarian	Pin

Qualified
AJ Styles and Samoa Joe
Mr. Anderson and Magnus
Bobby Roode and Kazarian

=== TNA X Division Championship Tournament (2013) ===
On the Destination X edition of Impact! TNA started a tournament to determine a new TNA X Division Champion, since the title was vacated after Chris Sabin traded it in for a shot at the World Championship. The tournament consisted of three three–way semifinal matches, taking place on the July 18 edition of Impact!, with the finals, another three–way match, taking place on July 25, 2013.

Semifinals
Sonjay Dutt
Homicide
Petey Williams
Manik
Chavo Guerrero Jr.
Kenny King

Finals
Sonjay Dutt
Manik
Greg Marasciulo

=== TNA World Heavyweight Championship Tournament (2013) ===
On October 29, 2013, TNA President Dixie Carter vacated the TNA World Heavyweight Championship after the previous champion A.J. Styles left the company with the championship title. On the October 31 edition of Impact Wrestling, Carter announced an eight-man tournament to determine a new TNA World Heavyweight Champion, that would begin on November 7. Seven of the eight men were former TNA World Heavyweight Champions including Jeff Hardy, Chris Sabin, Bobby Roode, James Storm, Kurt Angle, Austin Aries, and Samoa Joe. The eighth would be determined later in the night in a gauntlet match, which was eventually won by Magnus last eliminating Kazarian and Sting. Also later that night, Carter announced the "Wheel of Dixie" in which she would spin a wheel full of different stipulation that the competitors would compete in. The stipulations on the "Wheel of Dixie" were a Falls Count Anywhere match, a Bull Rope match, a Submission match, a Ladder match, a Full Metal Mayhem match, a Coalminer's Glove match, a Tables match, a Dixieland match, a Tuxedo match, and Last Man Standing match. The Storm/Roode match was originally a Bull Rope match but Storm asked Carter to change it to a Florida Death match, which was not on the "Wheel of Dixie", which Carter agreed to.

=== TNA X Division Championship Tournament (2014) ===
On the Destination X edition of Impact! TNA started a tournament to determine a new TNA X Division Champion, since the title was vacated after Austin Aries traded it in for a shot at the World Championship. The tournament consisted of three three–way semifinal matches, taking place on the July 31 edition of Impact!, with the finals, another three–way match, taking place on August 7, 2014.

Semifinals
Low-Ki
ManikZema Ion
Zema Ion
Brian Cage
Crazzy Steve
Sanada
Samoa Joe
Homicide
Tigre Uno

Finals
Low-Ki
Sanada
Samoa Joe

=== Gold Rush Tournament (2014) ===
On September 17, 2014 TNA Executive Director Kurt Angle announced a "Gold Rush" tournament. Which took place on September 24, 2014. Where the winners of 5 qualifying matches would advance to the main event later that night. The winner of the main event would earn a championship match against any TNA champion, at any time.

No.	Results	Stipulations	Times
1	MVP defeated Low Ki	Singles match to qualify for the main event match later that night	13:23
2	Tajiri defeated Robbie E	Singles match to qualify for the main event match later that night	4:36
3	Austin Aries defeated Knux	Singles match to qualify for the main event match later that night	7:02
4	Mr. Anderson defeated Magnus	Singles match to qualify for the main event match later that night.	6:01
5	Abyss defeated Samuel Shaw	Singles match to qualify for the main event match later that night.	6:02
6	Austin Aries defeated Tajiri, Mr. Anderson, Abyss, and MVP	Five-way match; the winner received a future title match against any TNA champion.	14:12

=== TNA World Tag Team Championship #1 Contender Tournament (2014) ===
On the October 15, 2014, edition of Impact Wrestling, TNA started an eight tag team tournament to determine the number one contenders for the TNA World Tag Team Championship, held by The Wolves (Eddie Edwards and Davey Richards).

Quarterfinals
Low Ki and Samoa Joe	Sub
Samuel Shaw and Gunner
Mr. Anderson and Chris Melendez	Pin
The Beat Down Clan (Kenny King and MVP)
The BroMans (Jessie Godderz and Zema Ion)
The Hardys (Matt and Jeff Hardy)	Pin
Team Dixie (Ethan Carter III and Tyrus)	Pin
Eric Young and Rockstar Spud

Semifinals
Low Ki and Samoa Joe	Sub
The Beat Down Clan
The Hardys	Pin
Team Dixie

Finals
Low Ki and Samoa Joe
The Hardys	Pin

=== TNA World Tag Team Championship Tournament (2015) ===
Between March 14 and March 16, 2015 episodes of Impact Wrestling a tournament was held to crown new TNA World Tag Team Champions.

No.	Results	Stipulations	Times
1	The Hardys (Jeff Hardy and Matt Hardy) defeated The Revolution (James Storm and Khoya)	TNA World Tag Team Championship Tournament Semifinal match	5:40
2	The Beatdown Clan (Kenny King and Low Ki) defeated Mr. Anderson and Rockstar Spud	TNA World Tag Team Championship Tournament Semifinal match	6:50
3	Bram and Ethan Carter III defeated Jay Rios and Tigre Uno	TNA World Tag Team Championship Tournament Semifinal match	3:50
4	Austin Aries and Bobby Roode defeated The BroMans (Jessie Godderz and Robbie E)	TNA World Tag Team Championship Tournament Semifinal match	5:20
5	The Hardys (Jeff Hardy and Matt Hardy) defeated Austin Aries and Bobby Roode, Bram and Ethan Carter III and The Beatdown Clan (Kenny King and Low Ki)	Ultimate X match for the vacant TNA World Tag Team Championship	12:06

=== TNA X Division Championship Tournament (2015) ===
On the Destination X 2015 edition of Impact! TNA started a tournament to determine a new TNA X Division Champion, since the title was vacated after Rockstar Spud traded it in for a shot at the World Championship. The tournament consisted of three three–way semifinal matches, taking place on the June 10th edition of Impact!, with the finals, another three–way match, taking place on June 27, 2015.

Semifinals
Low-Ki
Crazzy Steve
Manik
Grado
Cruz
Kenny King

Finals
Low-Ki
Grado
Tigre Uno

=== TNA World Title Series (2015) ===
On October 7, 2015, it was announced that a tournament would take place, after TNA World Heavyweight Champion Matt Hardy vacated the title a day prior due to a legal injunction filed by former champion Ethan Carter III. The World Title Series places 32 wrestlers into 8 groups of 4, with the first round being under a round-robin format. Also, for the first time ever, the Knockouts were given an opportunity to compete for the World Heavyweight Title.

Each winner in the round-robin matches is awarded 3 points, and a draw is worth 1 point for each, with each match having a 15-minute time limit. The two members of each group with the most points will advance to the final 16, where at that point the tournament switches to a single elimination format.

=== Impact Grand Championship Tournament (2016) ===
The title was introduced at the August 13, 2016 tapings of TNA's television program Impact Wrestling' after TNA President Billy Corgan announced that the TNA King of the Mountain Championship would be deactivated and retired in favor for the Impact Grand Championship. Corgan also announced an 8-man single elimination tournament that would feature new rules that would apply to the title. The new rules would be similar to the UFC in which each match will be three timed rounds, with a team of judges to award the win based on points, if there is no winner via pin or submission within the time limit. The final match was at 2016's Bound for Glory, where, due to injury Eddie Edwards subbed for Drew Galloway against Aron Rex to determine the inaugural champion.

=== Impact Knockouts Championship Tournament (2017) ===
On November 23, 2017 it was announced after Gail Kim retired and vacated the Impact Knockouts Championship that it would be a 6-Women tournament to determine who would be the new Knockouts Champion where two triple threat matches will happen and one finals.

Semifinals
Laurel Van Ness	Pin
Madison Rayne & KC Spinelli	N/A
Sienna & Allie	N/A
Rosemary	Pin

Finals
Laurel Van Ness	Pin
Rosemary	N/A

=== Impact Mashup Tournament (2019) ===
The Impact Mashup Tournament was held in 2019 to determine the #1 contender for the Impact World Championship at Bound for Glory. Four qualification matches for the tournament were held on the July 19, 2019 episode of Impact Wrestling, where wrestlers were randomly paired as partners in tag team matches and the winners of the four tag team matches qualified for a fatal four-way elimination match in the main event of that episode and the participants of the winning team qualified for the #1 contender's match at Unbreakable.

Qualifiers; Impact Wrestling (July 19)
Moose and Eddie Edwards	Pin
Rohit Raju and Cody Deaner	5:14
Rich Swann and Madman Fulton	Pin
Wentz and Jake Crist	5:50
Michael Elgin and Willie Mack	Pin
Ace Austin and Stone Rockwell	N/A
Sami Callihan and Tessa Blanchard	Pin
Dave Crist and Trey	11:26

Final; Impact Wrestling (July 19)
Moose and Eddie Edwards
Wentz and Jake Crist
Michael Elgin and Willie Mack	Pin
Sami Callihan and Tessa Blanchard	12:07

#1 Contender's match (Unbreakable)
Sami Callihan	Pin
Tessa Blanchard	17:45

=== Impact World Championship #1 Contender's Tournament (2020) ===
A tournament was held to determine the new #1 contender for the Impact World Championship from the May 12, 2020 to June 2, 2020 episodes of Impact!.

Quarterfinals
Impact!	Hernandez	Pin
5/12	Madman Fulton	9:01
Impact!	Ace Austin	Pin
5/19	Rhino	10:40
Impact!	Rohit Raju	Pin
5/12	Trey	10:32
Impact!	Michael Elgin	Pin
5/19	Sami Callihan	15:20

Semifinals
Impact!	Hernandez	Pin
5/26	Ace Austin	9:50
Impact!	Trey	Pin
5/26	Michael Elgin	18:00

Final
Impact!	Ace Austin	Pin
6/2	Wentz†	17:19

†Trey was attacked before his match and his The Rascalz teammate Wentz took his place in the finals.

=== Impact Knockouts Tag Team Revival Championship Tournament (2020–2021) ===
Over the course of 2020, Impact Wrestling (which had been renamed from TNA in 2017) signed several female talents such as Nevaeh, Tasha Steelz, Deonna Purrazzo, and Kimber Lee, all of which were paired with already established names on the roster. After months of competition between the tag teams in the Knockouts division, on October 24 at the Bound for Glory pay-per-view, Madison Rayne announced that after nearly eight years of inactivity, Impact Wrestling is reviving the Knockouts Tag Team Championship. It was also announced that an eight-team tournament would take place over the next two months to determine the next champions. The brackets were announced in November, with the final taking place at the Hard To Kill pay-per-view in January 2021. At Hard To Kill, Fire 'N Flava (Kiera Hogan and Tasha Steelz) defeated Havok and Nevaeh in the tournament final to win the revived titles.

Tournament Bracket

Round One; Impact! (November 17 & 24, December 1 & 8, 2020)
Tenille Dashwood and Alisha	6:32
Havok and Nevaeh
Killer Kelly and Renee Michelle	8:54
Jazz and Jordynne Grace	Pin
Fire 'N Flava (Kiera Hogan and Tasha Steelz)	Pin
Team Sea Stars (Ashley Vox and Delmi Exo)	7:10
Deonna Purrazzo and Kimber Lee	06:59
Taya Valkyrie and Rosemary	Pin

Round Two; Impact! (December 15, 2020 & January 5, 2021)
Havok and Nevaeh	Pin
Jazz and Jordynne Grace	08:48
Fire 'N Flava	Pin
Taya Valkyrie and Rosemary	07:58

Finals; Hard to Kill (January 16, 2021)
Havok and Nevaeh	09:40
Fire 'N Flava	Pin

=== Homecoming Tournament ===
A tournament featuring mixed tag teams was held to determine the "King and Queen" at Homecoming on July 31, 2021.

First round Homecoming (July 31, 2021)
Swinger's Palace (Hernandez and Alisha Edwards)	Pin
Matthew Rehwoldt and Deonna Purrazzo
The Pump Family (Petey Williams and Jordynne Grace)	Pin
Matt Cardona and Chelsea Green
Decay (Crazzy Steve and Rosemary)
Fallah 'N Flava (Fallah Bahh and Tasha Steelz)	Pin
The Road Warriors (Tommy Dreamer and Rachael Ellering)
Brian Myers and Missy Hyatt	Pin

Semi-finals; Homecoming (July 31, 2021)
Matthew Rehwoldt and Deonna Purrazzo
Matt Cardona and Chelsea Green	Pin
Decay (Crazzy Steve and Rosemary)
The Road Warriors (Tommy Dreamer and Rachael Ellering)	Pin

Final; Homecoming (July 31, 2021)
Matthew Rehwoldt and Deonna Purrazzo
Decay (Crazzy Steve and Rosemary)	Pin

=== Knockouts Knockdown Tournament (2021) ===
On the September 23 episode of Impact!, producer Gail Kim announced an eight-woman, one night tournament for the Knockouts Knockdown event, where the winner will earn a future shot at the Impact Knockouts Championship.

Quarter-finals; Knockouts Knockdown (October 9, 2021)
Tasha Steelz	Pin
Jamie Senegal	11:04
Chelsea Green	Pin
Renee Michelle	8:28
Rachael Ellering	Pin
Lady Frost	11:54
Brandi Lauren	2:09
Mercedes Martinez	Pin

Semi-finals; Knockouts Knockdown (October 9, 2021)
Tasha Steelz	Pin
Chelsea Green	12:23
Rachael Ellering	12:30
Mercedes Martinez	Sub

Final; Knockouts Knockdown (October 9, 2021)
Tasha Steelz	10:58
Mercedes Martinez	Pin

=== Impact X Division Championship Tournament (2021) ===
On the September 23 episode of Impact!, Impact started a tournament to determine the new Impact X Division Champion, since the title was vacated after Josh Alexander invoked Option C to challenge for the Impact World Championship. The tournament consist of three three–way semi-final matches, with the finals, another three–way match, will taking place at Bound for Glory.

First round Impact! (September 30, 2021 – October 14, 2021)
8:41	Alex Zayne
Laredo Kid
Pin	Trey Miguel
7:12	Black Taurus
Petey Williams
Pin	Steve Maclin
Pin	El Phantasmo
9:38	Willie Mack
Rohit Raju

Final; Bound for Glory (October 23, 2021)
Pin	Trey Miguel
13:21	Steve Maclin
El Phantasmo

=== Impact Digital Media Championship Tournament (2021) ===
On the September 30 episode of Impact!, the Impact Digital Media Championship was introduced and it was announced that an intergender tournament will be held with the inaugural champion being crowned in the final at Bound for Glory. The first round matches will air on Tuesdays and Wednesdays on Impact Plus and on YouTube for Impact Ultimate Insider members, before being distributed to the public across all social media platforms 24 hours later.

First round

- John Skyler defeated Zicky Dice – October 5, 2021
- Crazzy Steve defeated Hernandez – October 6, 2021
- Fallah Bahh defeated Sam Beale – October 12, 2021
- Jordynne Grace defeated Johnny Swinger – October 13, 2021
- Chelsea Green defeated Madison Rayne – October 19, 2021
- Tenille Dashwood defeated Alisha Edwards – October 20, 2021

Final

- Jordynne Grace defeated Chelsea Green, Crazzy Steve (with Black Taurus), Fallah Bahh, John Skyler, and Madison Rayne* – October 23, 2021

*Madison Rayne replaced Tenille Dashwood, who was removed from match.

=== Impact X Division Championship Tournament (2022) ===
On October 20, 2022, after Frankie Kazarian vacated the Impact X Division Championship for a shot at the Impact World Championship it was announced that there will be an eight-man tournament to determine who will be the new Impact X Division Champion on November 18, 2022, at Impact Pay-per-view Over Drive.

Quarterfinals; Impact! Before the Impact; October 21, 2022 (aired October 27 and November 3, 2022)
Black Taurus	Pin
Laredo Kid	8:05
Yuya Uemura	8:33
PJ Black	Pin
Alan Angels	8:17
Trey Miguel	Pin
Kenny King	8:44
Mike Bailey	Pin

Semifinals; Impact! October 22, 2022 (aired November 10 and 17, 2022)
Black Taurus	Pin
PJ Black	6:19
Trey Miguel	DQ
Mike Bailey	7:02

Final; Over Drive (November 18, 2022)
Black Taurus	15:50
Trey Miguel	Pin

=== Impact World Tag Team Championship #1 Contendership Tournament (2023) ===
On August 2, 2023 a new four man tag team tournament was announced where the winners will face Subculture (Mark Andrews and Flash Morgan Webster) (with their female valet Dani Luna in their corner) for the Impact World Tag Team Championships at Impact Pay-per-view Emergence of year 2023.

== Annual tournaments ==
=== Bound for Glory Series ===
The Bound for Glory Series are a tournament in which 12 wrestlers compete in a series of matches over several months to determine who receives a shot at the TNA World Heavyweight Championship at Bound for Glory.

=== TNA Turkey Bowl ===
The TNA Turkey Bowl is a special match that airs on the Thanksgiving night episode of Impact!. Initially, it was a tournament held in 2007 and 2008 that aired on the Thanksgiving night episode of TNA Impact!, and consisted of three preliminary three-way matches. Each match featured a member of the Heavyweight Division, the X Division, and the Tag Team Division, with the winner of the match going on to the finals. The winner of the finals, also a three-way match, won $25,000. The wrestler who was pinned in the finals was forced to put on a turkey suit. The 2008 Turkey Bowl would be the last until 2011, where it would return, but as a single match going forward. This format lasted until 2016, save for a two year absence, and for the 2017 Turkey Bowl, it was changed to a five-on-five intergender tag team match.

=== One Night Only ===
Impact One Night Only is a periodic series of PPV events held around a particular theme. This section is for annual One Night Only events.

==== Joker's Wild ====
Joker's Wild consists of seven tag team matches, where partners are picked by a random lottery. The winning teams advance to the main event, a 14-man battle royal for the chance to win a $100,000 prize.

Year	Wrestler
2013	James Storm
2014	Ethan Carter III
2015	Lashley
2016	Drew Galloway
2017	Moose

==== Queen of the Knockouts ====
Knockouts Knockdown is an event where current members of the TNA Knockouts Division take on female wrestlers from the independent circuit, with the winners advancing to the main event, a gauntlet battle royal where the winner will be crowned "Queen of the Knockouts."

Year	Wrestler
2013	Gail Kim
2014	Madison Rayne
2015	Awesome Kong
2016	Jade

==== World Cup ====
Teams of wrestlers from around the World compete in Heavyweight, X Division, Tag Team and Knockouts Division matches, the winning team members gaining points for their respective teams. The two teams with the most points face off in the main event in a Five-on-Five Elimination tag team match to crown the winners of the TNA World Cup.

Year	Wrestlers
2013	Team USA (Christopher Daniels, James Storm, Kazarian, Kenny King, Mickie James)
2014	Team Young (Eric Young, Bully Ray, Eddie Edwards, Gunner, ODB)
2015	Team Hardy (Jeff Hardy, Gunner, Crazzy Steve, Davey Richards, Rockstar Spud, Gail Kim)
2016	Team Hardy (Jeff Hardy, Eddie Edwards, Robbie E, Jessie Godderz, Jade)
2019	Team AAA (Psycho Clown, Puma King, Aero Star, El Hijo del Vikingo)

In January 2019 taping, Impact brought back the World Cup name for a tournament in partnership with Lucha Libre AAA Worldwide. Team Impact consisted of Sami Callihan, Eli Drake, Eddie Edwards and Fallah Bahh, and Team AAA consisted of Aero Star, El Hijo del Vikingo, Puma King and Psycho Clown. The match, which aired the February 15 Impact!, was a 4 on 4 single elimination match. The match came down to Edwards and Clown with, Clown eliminating Edwards, after Drake hit Edwards with a kendostick.

== See also ==
- Professional wrestling tournament
