= Ellering =

Ellering is a surname. Notable people with the surname include:

- Paul Ellering (born 1953), American wrestler and wrestling manager
- Rachael Ellering (born 1992), American wrestler
