= Bound for Glory (2021) =

Impact Wrestling pay-per-view event

- Promotional poster featuring Christian Cage and Josh Alexander
- Promotion: Impact Wrestling
- Date: October 23, 2021
- City: Sunrise Manor, Nevada
- Venue: Sam's Town Live

Pay-per-view chronology
← Previous; Slammiversary	Next → Hard To Kill

Bound for Glory chronology
← Previous; 2020	Next → 2022

The 2021 Bound for Glory was a professional wrestling pay-per-view event produced by Impact Wrestling. It took place on October 23, 2021, at Sam's Town Live in Sunrise Manor, Nevada. This was Impact Wrestling's first event to take place outside of Nashville, Tennessee, since March 2020. It was the 17th event under the Bound for Glory chronology and featured wrestlers from Impact's partner promotions All Elite Wrestling (AEW), Mexico's Lucha Libre AAA Worldwide (AAA), and Japan's New Japan Pro-Wrestling (NJPW).

Nine matches were contested at the event, including one on the pre-show. In what had been the advertised main event, Josh Alexander defeated Christian Cage to win the Impact World Championship. However, Moose invoked his Call Your Shot Gauntlet championship match privilege (which he won earlier in the night) to immediately challenge and defeat Alexander, winning the World Championship in front of his family to close the show.

In other prominent matches, Mickie James defeated Deonna Purrazzo to win the Impact Knockouts Championship, Trey Miguel defeated El Phantasmo and Steve Maclin in a tournament final three-way match to win the vacant Impact X Division Championship, and in the opening bout, the debuting The IInspiration (Cassie Lee and Jessica McKay) defeated Decay (Havok and Rosemary) to win the Impact Knockouts Tag Team Championship.

== Production ==
Other on-screen personnel
Commentators	Matt Striker
Commentators	D'Lo Brown
Ring announcer	David Penzer
Referees	Brian Hebner
Referees	Brandon Tolle
Referees	Daniel Spencer
Interviewer	Gia Miller

=== Background ===
On July 17, 2021, at Slammiversary, it was announced that Bound for Glory would take place on October 23, 2021. On September 10, 2021, Impact announced that Bound for Glory would be held at Sam's Town Live in Sunrise Manor, Nevada, marking Impact's first event held outside of its home base of Skyway Studios in Nashville, Tennessee, since March 2020, just before the COVID-19 pandemic took effect.

=== Storylines ===
The event featured several professional wrestling matches, which involve different wrestlers from pre-existing scripted feuds, plots, and storylines. Wrestlers portray heroes, villains, or less distinguishable characters in scripted events that build tension and culminate in a wrestling match or series of matches. Storylines were produced on Impact's weekly television program.

At Victory Road, after Christian Cage successfully retained the Impact World Championship against Ace Austin, Impact X Division Champion Josh Alexander, who earlier defended the title against Chris Sabin, approached Cage and invoked Option C. Alexander would face Cage for the Impact World Championship at Bound for Glory.

On the September 23 episode of Impact!, a third annual Call Your Shot Gauntlet match was scheduled for Bound for Glory. Rich Swann, Brian Myers, Moose, and W. Morrissey were announced as participants. On the October 14 episode of Impact!, a battle royal was held to determine the first and final entrants in the Call Your Shot Gauntlet match at Bound for Glory, with the first spot of Call Your Shot Gauntlet match was given to the runner-up of the battle royal. W. Morrissey won the battle royal by last eliminating Chris Sabin, thus making Morrissey the last entrant and Sabin the first entrant in the Call Your Shot Gauntlet match.

On the September 23 episode of Impact!, Impact started a tournament to determine the new Impact X Division Champion, since the title was vacated after Alexander invoked Option C to challenge for the Impact World Championship. The tournament consist of three three-way semi-final matches, with the finals, another three-way match, taking place at Bound for Glory. Trey Miguel, Steve Maclin, and El Phantasmo advanced to the final with victories over Alex Zayne and Laredo Kid, Black Taurus and Petey Williams, and Willie Mack and Rohit Raju, respectively.

At Slammiversary, Mickie James made her return to Impact, confronting Impact Knockouts Champion Deonna Purrazzo after her defense of the title against Thunder Rosa. She would invite Purrazzo to defend the title at NWA EmPowerrr, where she is executive producer, only for Purrazzo to give her disrespect. James kicked Purrazzo in the face as a result. Purrazzo would eventually accept James' invite, successfully defending the Knockouts Championship against Melina at NWA EmPowerrr. The next night, at NWA 73, Purrazzo attacked James after the latter's match with Kylie Rae. James would continuously call out Purrazzo in the coming weeks, saying she has yet to truly see "Hardcore Country" Mickie James. On the September 23 episode of Impact!, it was announced that James would make her in-ring return to Impact, as she challenges Purrazzo for the Knockouts Championship at Bound for Glory.

On the September 30 episode of Impact!, the Impact Digital Media Championship was introduced and it was announced that an intergender tournament will be held with the inaugural champion being crowned in the final at the Countdown to Glory pre-show. The first round matches will air on Tuesdays and Wednesdays on Impact Plus and on YouTube for Impact Ultimate Insider members, before being distributed to the public across all social media platforms 24 hours later. John Skyler, Crazzy Steve, Fallah Bahh, Jordynne Grace, Chelsea Green, and Tenille Dashwood advanced to the final with victories over Zicky Dice, Hernandez, Sam Beale, Johnny Swinger, Madison Rayne, and Alisha Edwards, respectively. On October 22, it was announced that Dashwood was removed from the match and was replaced by Madison Rayne.

At Knockouts Knockdown, Impact announced that The IInspiration (Cassie Lee and Jessica McKay), formerly The IIconics (Peyton Royce and Billie Kay) in WWE, would make their debut for the promotion at Bound for Glory. On October 13, it was later announced that The IInspiration will be challenging Decay (Havok and Rosemary) for the Impact Knockouts Tag Team Championship at the event.

At Sacrifice in March, Rhino joined Violent By Design (Eric Young, Deaner, and Joe Doering). In May, he invoked his Call Your Shot Gauntlet championship privilege as he and Doering defeated FinJuice (David Finlay and Juice Robinson) to win the Impact World Tag Team Championship. They held the titles until July, when they lost them to The Good Brothers (Doc Gallows and Karl Anderson) at Slammiversary. After failed to regain the tag titles, stable leader Young blamed Rhino for failing to recapture the titles and they tortured him to cure him of "the sickness". On the September 16 episode of Impact!, Young, Deaner, and Doering attacked Rhino, thus kicking him out of the VBD. On the September 30 episode of Impact!, Rhino's former tag team partner Heath saved Rhino from a potential attack by VBD, and Heath then looked to give Rhino a hug afterwards, but Rhino would walk out of the ring. In the following weeks, Rhino was not sure which side to take, and Heath asks Impact EVP Scott D'Amore to make a match pitting him and anyone else against Violent By Design at Bound for Glory, which was accepted.

On the September 30 episode of Impact!, Impact World Tag Team Champions The Good Brothers proposed a number one contender's match between FinJuice and Bullet Club (Chris Bey and Hikuleo), where the winners face them for the Impact World Tag Team Championship at Bound for Glory. The match occurred on the October 21 episode of Impact!, where the match ended in a no contest, thus making it a three-way tag team match.

== Results ==
No.	Results	Stipulations	Times
1^{P}	Jordynne Grace (with Rachael Ellering) defeated Chelsea Green, Crazzy Steve (with Black Taurus), Fallah Bahh, John Skyler, and Madison Rayne (with Kaleb with a K) by pinfall	Tournament final intergender six-way match for the inaugural Impact Digital Media Championship	5:04
2	The IInspiration (Cassie Lee and Jessica McKay) defeated Decay (Havok and Rosemary) (c) by pinfall	Tag team match for the Impact Knockouts Tag Team Championship	8:58
3	Trey Miguel defeated El Phantasmo and Steve Maclin by pinfall	Tournament final three-way match for the vacant Impact X Division Championship	13:21
4	Heath and Rhino defeated Violent By Design (Deaner and Joe Doering) (with Eric Young) by pinfall	Tag team match	4:59
5	Moose won by last eliminating Matt Cardona	20-person Intergender Call Your Shot Gauntlet match The winner receives a trophy and a contract they can invoke anytime within one year for a championship match of their choosing.	29:33
6	The Good Brothers (Doc Gallows and Karl Anderson) (c) defeated FinJuice (David Finlay and Juice Robinson) and Bullet Club (Chris Bey and Hikuleo) by pinfall	Three-way tag team match for the Impact World Tag Team Championship	9:55
7	Mickie James defeated Deonna Purrazzo (c) by pinfall	Singles match for the Impact Knockouts Championship; Matthew Rehwoldt was banned from ringside.	13:17
8	Josh Alexander defeated Christian Cage (c) by submission	Singles match for the Impact World Championship; This was Alexander's Option C World Championship match.	18:52
9	Moose defeated Josh Alexander (c) by pinfall	Singles match for the Impact World Championship; This was Moose's Call Your Shot championship match.	0:07
(c) / – the champion(s) heading into the match; P / – the match was broadcast on the pre-show

=== Impact X Division Championship Tournament ===
1st Round; Impact! September 30 – October 14, 2021
Alex Zayne	—
Laredo Kid	8:41
Trey Miguel	Pinfall
Black Taurus	—
Petey Williams	7:12
Steve Maclin	Pinfall
El Phantasmo	Pinfall
Rohit Raju	9:38
Willie Mack	—

Final; Bound for Glory; October 23, 2021
Trey Miguel	Pinfall
Steve Maclin	—
El Phantasmo	13:21

=== Impact Digital Media Championship Tournament ===
1st Round; Digital Media Championship Tournament; October 5–20, 2021
John Skyler	Pinfall
Zicky Dice	4:59
Crazzy Steve	Pinfall
Hernandez	3:55
Fallah Bahh	Pinfall
Sam Beale	3:59
Johnny Swinger	5:58
Jordynne Grace	Pinfall
Chelsea Green	Pinfall
Madison Rayne	3:45
Alisha Edwards	6:21
Tenille Dashwood	Pinfall

Final; Bound for Glory; October 23, 2021
John Skyler	5:04
Crazzy Steve	—
Fallah Bahh	—
Jordynne Grace	Pinfall
Chelsea Green	—
Madison Rayne (Note: Madison Rayne replaced Tenille Dashwood, who was removed from the match.)	—

=== Call Your Shot Gauntlet entrances and eliminations ===
Draw	Entrant	Eliminated by	Order	Elimination(s)
1	Chris Sabin	Moose and W. Morrissey	16	2
2	Rocky Romero	Rohit Raju	1	0
3	Madman Fulton	Chris Sabin, Rachael Ellering, and Rohit Raju	2	0
4	Rohit Raju	Moose and W. Morrissey	14	2
5	Tasha Steelz	Melina	6	1
6	Rachael Ellering	Tasha Steelz	4	2
7	Savannah Evans	Rachael Ellering	3	0
8	Johnny Swinger	The Demon	5	0
9	Melina	Brian Myers	7	1
10	The Demon	Ace Austin	9	1
11	Brian Myers	Sam Beale	8	1
12	Matt Cardona	Moose	19	0
13	Laredo Kid	Eddie Edwards	11	0
14	Sam Beale	Moose	10	1
15	Rich Swann	Moose and W. Morrissey	17	0
16	Ace Austin	Chris Sabin	15	1
17	Moose	—	Winner	6
18	Eddie Edwards	W. Morrissey	13	1
19	Alisha Edwards	W. Morrissey	12	0
20	W. Morrissey	Moose	18	5
