= Tenille Dashwood =

Australian professional wrestler

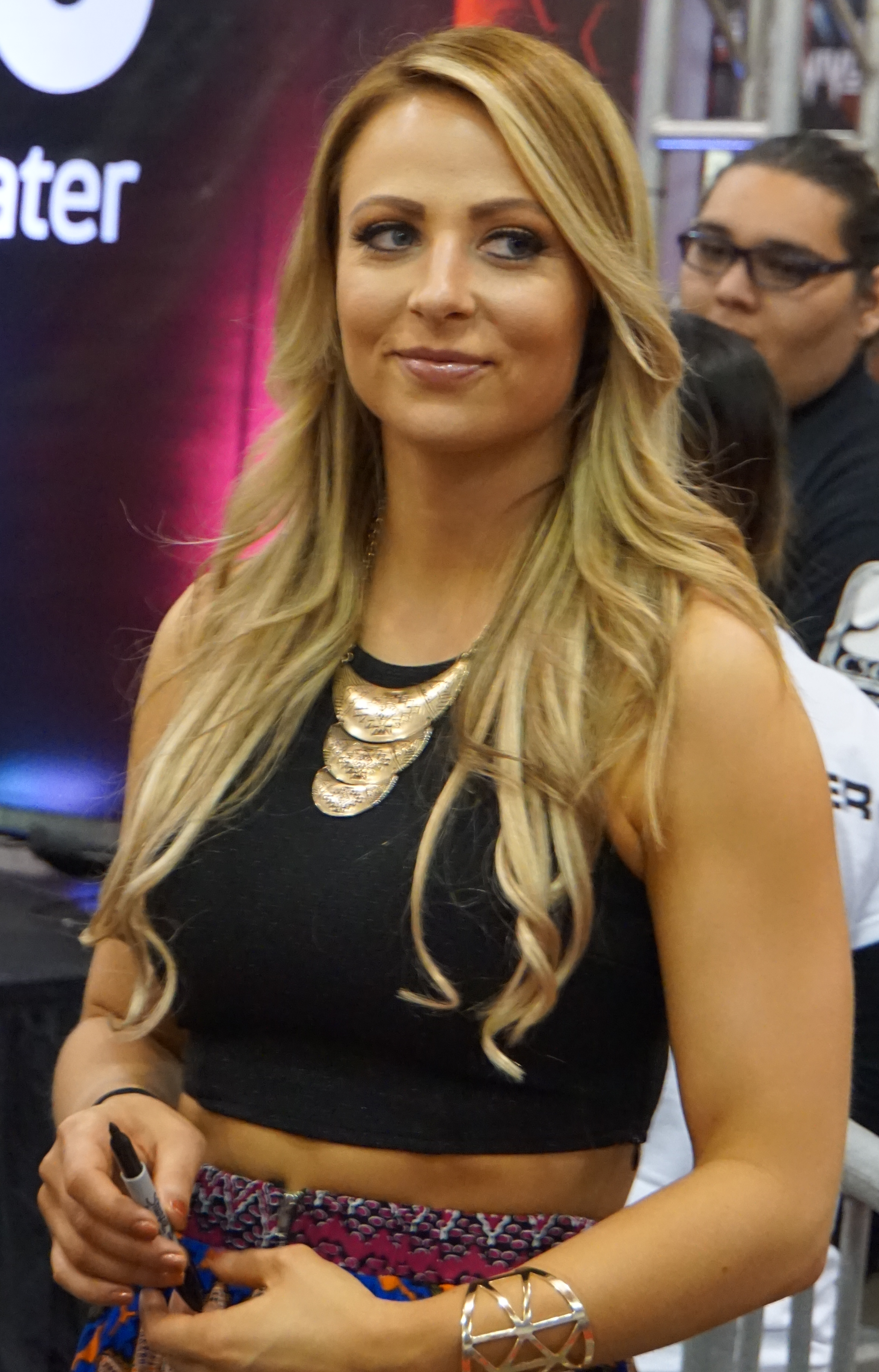
- Dashwood in 2015

Personal information
- Born: Tenille Averil Dashwood; 1 March 1989 (age 37) Boronia, Victoria, Australia
- Spouse: Riddick Moss (m. 2024)
- Children: 2

Professional wrestling career
- Ring name(s): Emma; Emmalina; Tenille Dashwood; Tenille Tayla; Tenille Williams; Valentine
- Billed height: 5 ft 5 in (1.65 m)
- Billed weight: 132 lb (60 kg)
- Billed from: Melbourne, Australia
- Trained by: Lance Storm; WWE Performance Center
- Debut: 2005

Tenille Averil Dashwood (born 1 March 1989) is an Australian-American professional wrestler and social influencer. She is best known for her tenure in WWE, under the ring name Emma. She is also known for her time in Ring of Honor (ROH) and Impact Wrestling, where she performed under her real name.

Dashwood started training for professional wrestling in Australia in 2003 when she was 13 years old. In 2008, Dashwood went to Canada to train at the Storm Wrestling Academy. She wrestled in Australia and North America on the independent circuit for promotions like Elite Canadian Championship Wrestling (ECCW) and Shimmer Women Athletes under the ring name Tenille Tayla. In 2011, she signed with WWE, thus she became the first female Australian wrestler to be signed to WWE. She is also a former Impact Knockouts World Tag Team Champion.

== Early life ==
Tenille Averil Dashwood was born and raised in Boronia, Victoria, a suburb of Melbourne. She has an older brother named Jake, who introduced her to professional wrestling. She cites Stone Cold Steve Austin, Trish Stratus and Lita as her inspirations in wrestling. She met Dustin Rhodes in 1997 and, at the age of 13 in 2002, she met Stratus at WWE Global Warning Tour: Melbourne.

== Professional wrestling career ==
=== Training and early career (2003–2011) ===
Dashwood was introduced to wrestling by her older brother, Jake, when she was about eight years old. She involved herself in the Australian wrestling scene, and did some training from the ages of 13 to 15. In 2005, Dashwood made some appearances for the Australian wrestling promotion Pro Wrestling Australia under the ring name Valentine. However, from the age of 16 to 18, Dashwood was limited to setting up the ring at events and helping out after she suffered a severe shoulder injury. In 2008, she moved to Calgary, Alberta, Canada, for a few months to train with Lance Storm at the Storm Wrestling Academy.

In early 2011, Dashwood returned to Lance Storm's Storm Wrestling Academy for further training, during which she became one of the ten trainees featured on the World of Hurt reality television show.

Dashwood returned to Australia by September 2008 and wrestled there until February 2009 for promotions such as Wrestlerock and PWA Queensland.

Dashwood then travelled to the United States, and made her in-ring debut for all-female American promotion Shimmer Women Athletes on 2 May 2009 at Volume 23 as Tenille Tayla, where she lost to Amber O'Neal. At Volume 25, Tenille defeated Jetta of the International Home Wrecking Crew, but was attacked by the Crew after the match. At Volume 26, Tenille lost to Rain, another member of the Crew. Rain and Jetta defeated Tenille and Jessie McKay at Volume 28. Tenille teamed with McKay again at Volume 36, when they unsuccessfully challenged Portia Perez and Nicole Matthews for the Shimmer Tag Team Championship.

Dashwood made her debut for the Canadian wrestling promotion Extreme Canadian Championship Wrestling (ECCW) on 22 May 2009 under her real name. In 2009, Dashwood also wrestled for another Canadian promotion, Prairie Wrestling Alliance, as Tenille Williams. In Dashwood's debut match for ECCW, she defeated Nicole Matthews to earn a shot at the SuperGirls Championship, but later lost to champion Veronika Vice. On 1 August, Tenille defeated Vice and Matthews in a three-way match to win her first ECCW Supergirls title. By racking up successful titles defences in singles matches against Vice and Matthews, Tenille held the championship until 27 November 2009, when she lost it back to Vice. At 19 March 2010 ECCW event, Tenille defeated Veronika Vice to re-capture the ECCW Women's Championship. She then made successful title defences against Vice, Nicole Matthews, and Lylah Lodge in singles matches, as well as against Matthews and KC Spinelli in a three-way match. Dashwood lost the title to Matthews in a tables match on 26 October, and went on to lose a title rematch to Matthews in December 2010. Tenille's last match in ECCW was on 7 May 2011, where she was defeated by Matthews.

On 9 July 2011, at a Melbourne City Wrestling event, Tenille had her last match in Australia before heading to WWE, and was defeated by Shazza McKenzie.

=== WWE (2011–2017) ===
==== Florida Championship Wrestling (2011–2012) ====
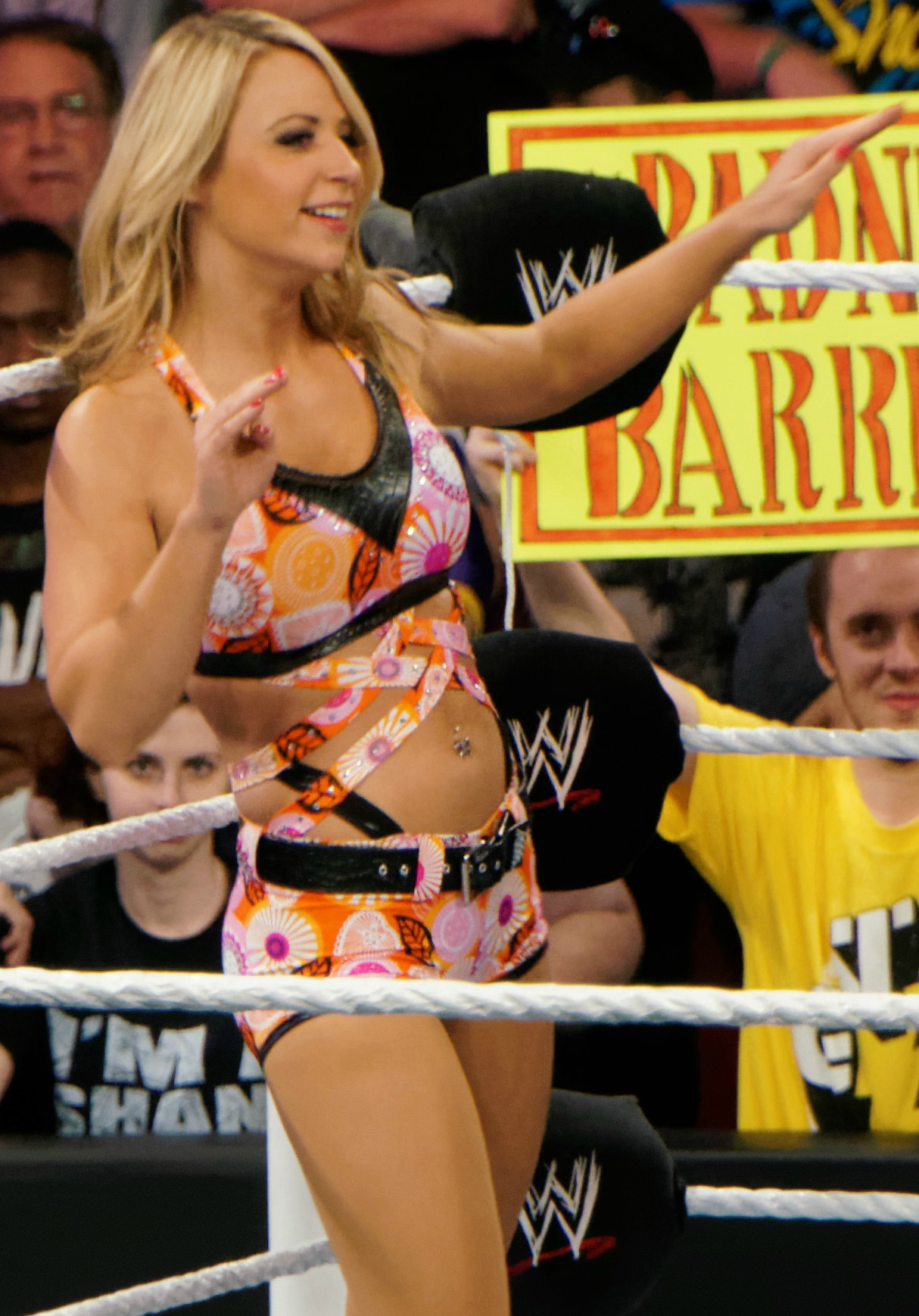
As part of her fan favourite character, Emma began performing a comical signature dance, as seen here.

In March 2011, Shimmer announced that Dashwood had signed a contract with World Wrestling Entertainment (WWE). In July 2011, Dashwood decided to undergo surgery for her shoulder, which had caused her problems throughout her career. After the surgery she applied again and the company signed her. In June 2012, Dashwood relocated to Tampa, Florida, and eventually reported to WWE's developmental territory Florida Championship Wrestling (FCW). She made her FCW in-ring debut on 1 August live event, participating in a battle royal. In August 2012, Dashwood revealed Emma as her new ring name.

==== NXT (2012–2016) ====
WWE went on to rebrand FCW into NXT in August 2012. Emma made her televised debut on 28 November episode of NXT, where she competed against Audrey Marie in a losing effort. Emma then debuted the gimmick of a clumsy dancer on 9 January 2013 episode of NXT. From April, Emma began to rack up wins over the likes of Bayley and Audrey Marie, while becoming one of NXT's most popular wrestlers. On 26 June episode of NXT, Emma competed in the NXT Women's Championship tournament to crown the inaugural champion. She defeated Aksana in the first round, and Summer Rae in the semi-finals on 10 July episode of NXT, before losing to Paige in the finals on 24 July episode of NXT.

On 7 August episode of NXT, Emma won a dance competition against Summer Rae to become the number one contender for the NXT Women's Championship, but Rae then attacked her to start a feud. In the following months, Emma teamed up with Paige to feud with Rae and Sasha Banks, collectively known as the Beautiful Fierce Females (BFFs). On 18 December episode of NXT, Emma was challenged by Natalya for Emma's shot at the NXT Women's Championship, which was contested on 1 January 2014 episode of NXT, in which Emma was victorious. On 27 February at NXT Arrival, Emma received her title match against Paige, but was unsuccessful in capturing the championship. After Paige was stripped of the championship in April, Emma lost to Charlotte in a tournament to determine the new champion. On 5 June episode of NXT, Emma and Paige saved Bayley from an attack from Summer Rae, Sasha Banks, and Charlotte. On 12 June, Emma teamed with Paige and Bayley to defeat the BFFs. On 28 January 2015 episode of NXT, Emma announced that she would be returning to NXT, stating that her tenure on the main roster was not working out. The following week on NXT, Emma was defeated by Carmella in her return match. In March, Emma turned heel after criticising Bayley in a backstage segment, which prompted a match between the two on 1 April episode on NXT, in which Emma was defeated. Emma continued her feud with Bayley, when she provided a distraction during Bayley's match with Dana Brooke, ensuring Brooke the victory and forming an alliance with her in the process. On 6 May episode of NXT, after Emma was defeated by Charlotte and later attacked by Bayley, a tag team match was made between Emma and Brooke and Bayley and Charlotte at NXT TakeOver: Unstoppable, which Emma and Brooke lost. On 27 May episode of NXT, Emma defeated Bayley, and after the match, Emma and Brooke attacked Bayley and Charlotte.

With her new heel direction, Emma preceded her finisher, the Emma-Lock (Muta lock, by a hair-pull stomp to the opponent's back) Emma ended her feud with Bayley when the latter returned from injury in mid-July, and defeated Emma. On 26 August episode of NXT (which was taped at the NXT TakeOver: Brooklyn event), Emma won a fatal four-way match against Becky Lynch, Charlotte, and Dana Brooke. In mid-September, Emma and Brooke were involved in a feud with newcomer Asuka, and confronted her during a contract signing with William Regal, which led to a match between Brooke and Asuka at NXT TakeOver: Respect on 7 October, where Emma was attacked by Asuka after attempting to interfere. Throughout November, Emma started provoking Asuka, including an attack planned by Emma and Brooke, which occurred on 25 November episode of NXT, resulting in a match between her and Asuka at the NXT TakeOver: London event on 16 December, which Emma lost, despite interference from Brooke. On 13 January 2016 episode of NXT, Emma competed in a number one contender's battle royal, which was won by Carmella. On 23 March episode of NXT, Emma lost against Asuka in the main event, which turned out to be her last televised match in NXT.

==== Main roster (2014–2017) ====
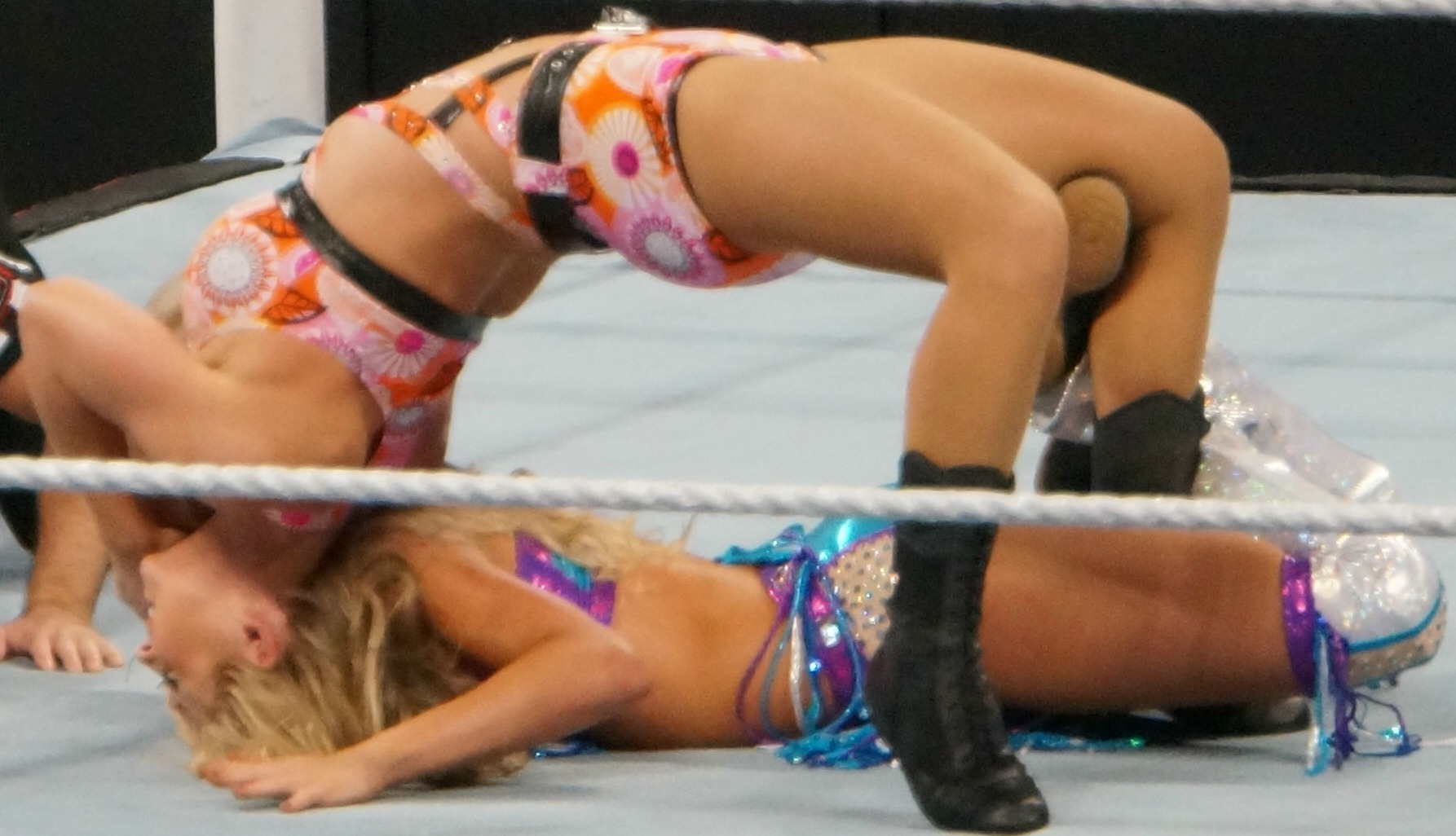
Emma applying the Emma Lock on Summer Rae

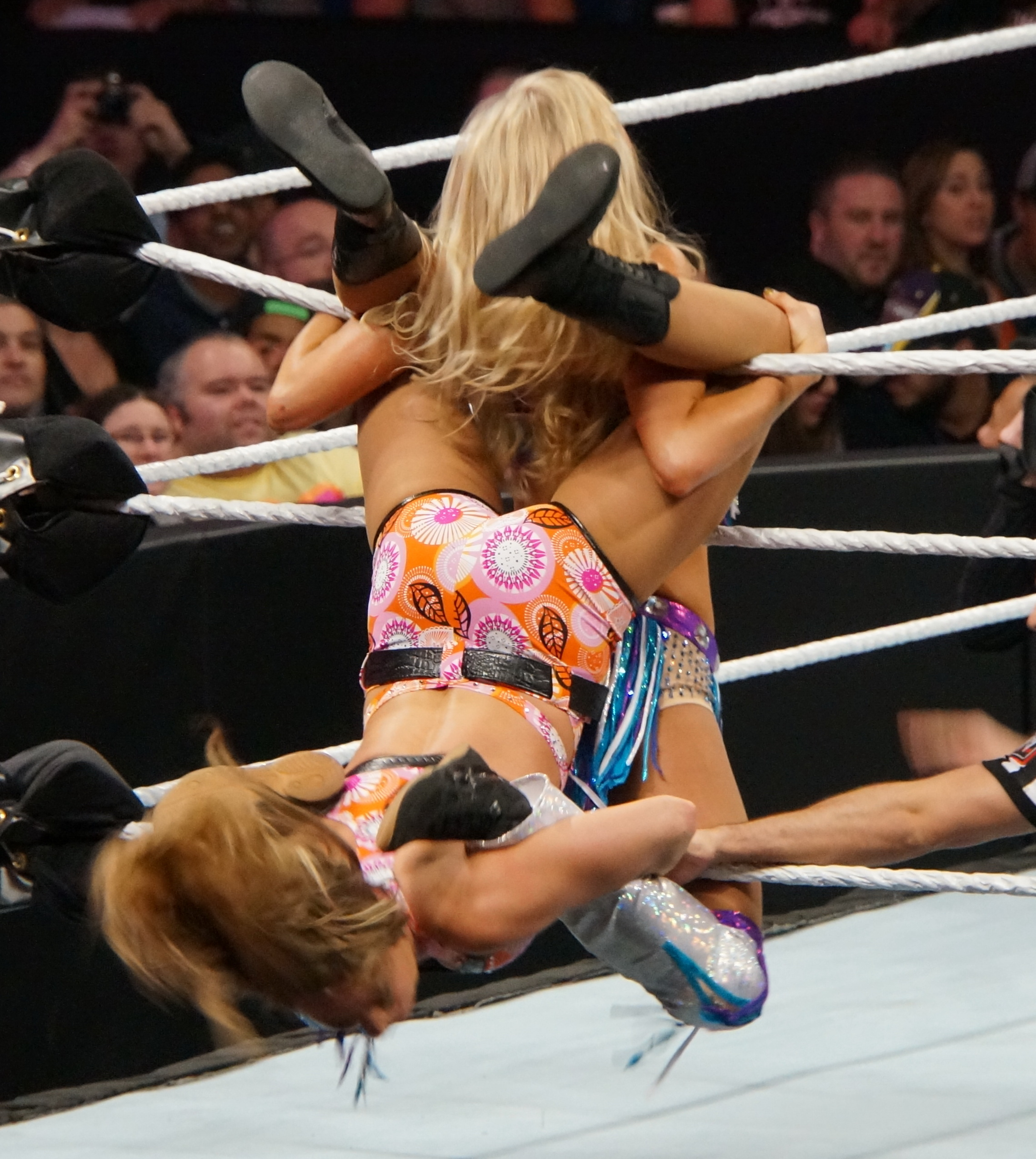
Emma applying the Dil-Emma on Summer Rae

On 13 January 2014 episode of Raw, Emma made her first appearance on the main roster when WWE acknowledged her appearing amongst the live audience. Her appearance made her the first Australian woman to debut on WWE television. Emma continued to appear in the crowd on Raw and SmackDown that month, with tensions developing between her and Summer Rae.

On 3 February episode of Raw, Emma was invited into the ring by Santino Marella to participate in a dance-off against Rae, which Emma won by a fan vote. In the following weeks, the feud between Emma and Rae continued, and Emma eventually began teasing an on-screen relationship with Marella. Emma and Rae faced off in a match on 24 February episode of Raw, in which Emma was victorious. This led to mixed tag team match against Rae and Fandango on 3 March episode of Raw, which Emma and Marella won. On 25 March episode of Main Event, Emma teamed up with Natalya, The Funkadactyls (Cameron and Naomi) and Eva Marie in a losing effort to the team of Rae, Alicia Fox, Aksana, Layla and Tamina Snuka. On 27 March episode of Superstars, Emma once again defeated Rae by submission. On 6 April, Emma made her WrestleMania debut, competing at WrestleMania XXX in the 14-Diva "Vickie Guerrero Invitational match" for the Divas Championship, which was won by the defending champion AJ Lee. The following night on Raw, Emma and Marella once again defeated Rae and Fandango in a mixed tag team match, with Emma making Rae submit. On the following episode of SmackDown, Emma started a feud with Layla, when she replaced Summer Rae as Fandango's dance partner and valet. This led to Emma using Marella's finisher, the Cobra Strike, later dubbing it the Ven-Emma, to defeat Layla on 21 April episode of Raw. In the beginning of July, Emma's alliance with Marella ended after he announced his legitimate retirement from in-ring competition.

Throughout the year, Emma racked up victories over the likes of Cameron and Alicia Fox, but also lost to them, and to the likes of Nikki Bella, Summer Rae and Paige. In November, at Survivor Series, Emma took part of a four-on-four elimination tag team match, where she eliminated Summer Rae before her team won the match with a clean sweep. While returning to NXT in early 2015, Emma competed in various matches on the main roster, including a battle royal to determine the number one contender for the Divas Championship, which was won by Paige.

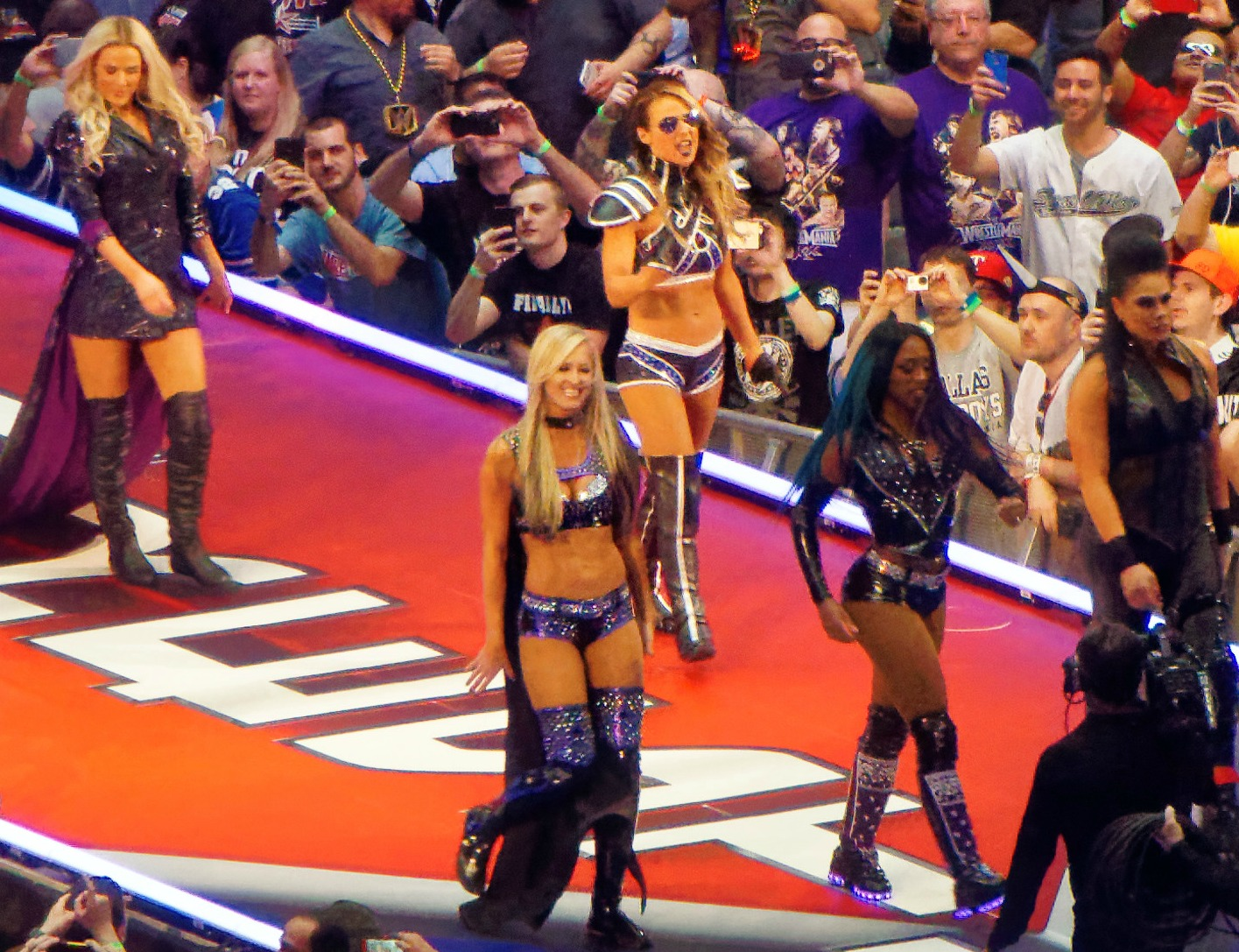
Emma (center), along fellow Team B.A.D. & Blonde members, walking to the ring before their match at the WrestleMania 32 event in April 2016

On 22 March episode of Main Event, Emma made her return to the main roster alongside Summer Rae by attacking Alicia Fox and Natalya during a match between Paige and Naomi, distracting Paige, and subsequently aligning herself with Team B.A.D., Lana and Rae, after a reconciliation between Lana and Summer. The following week, in her return match, Emma defeated Paige on 28 March episode of Raw, after being helped by Lana. Post-match, she along her allies, attacked Brie Bella, Natalya, Alicia Fox and Paige, before a returning Eva Marie cleared the area. As a result, a 10-Diva tag team match between the Total Divas team (Brie, Fox, Natalya, Eva and Paige) and the newly dubbed team B.A.D. & Blonde (Naomi, Tamina, Lana, Emma, and Rae) was announced for the WrestleMania 32's pay-per-view pre-show. At the event on 3 April, they were defeated by team Total Divas after Naomi submitted to Brie Bella. After WrestleMania, Emma began a feud with Becky Lynch, defeating her in singles competition on 2 May episode of Raw. The following week, Emma and the debuting Dana Brooke assaulted Lynch during a backstage segment.

On 16 May, WWE announced that Emma had suffered a back injury during a live event that would require surgery, causing her to go on hiatus. On 3 October 2016 episode of Raw, a repackage vignette was shown, teasing about a "makeover of Emma to Emmalina". WWE continued to display the vignettes of her upcoming return the following weeks. In late 2016 and again in early 2017, journalist Dave Meltzer described the vignettes as merely a running inside joke, and stated that "there's no spot ready for her" on television. Reportedly, the Emmalina gimmick was dropped due to WWE producers feeling that Dashwood could not pull off the character with the direction they would like to display it, which was to be a throwback to the likes of Sable and The Kat. The Emmalina character first appeared on 13 February 2017 episode of Raw, only to announce "the makeover from Emmalina to Emma".

Emma appeared on 3 April episode of Raw as her previous villainous persona. She teamed with Charlotte Flair and Nia Jax against Brooke, Sasha Banks, and Bayley in a losing effort. On 7 May, Emma suffered a shoulder injury at a live event in Liverpool, England. Emma made her return on 12 June episode of Raw in a six-woman tag team match, where she, Jax, and Alexa Bliss were defeated by Banks, Brooke, and Mickie James. On 4 September episode of Raw, Emma teamed with Jax to defeat both Bliss and Banks to earn spots for herself and Jax in the Raw Women's Championship match at No Mercy, her first pay per view match since the 2014 Survivor Series. At the event, she was unsuccessful after Bliss pinned the returning Bayley.

On 9 October episode of Raw, after confronting General Manager Kurt Angle about who would face the debuting Asuka, Emma defeated Sasha Banks, Alicia Fox, Bayley and Dana Brooke in an elimination match to earn the right to face Asuka at TLC: Tables, Ladders & Chairs, where she lost via submission. Frustrated over her loss, Emma challenged Asuka to rematch. On 23 October episode of Raw, Emma was defeated by Asuka which would be her final match in WWE. On 29 October 2017, WWE announced that Emma had officially been released from her WWE contract.

=== Independent circuit (2017–2019) ===
In November 2017, several independent promotions announced they had signed Dashwood to perform at their shows, beginning in February 2018. Dashwood's post-WWE debut was on 3 February, headlining a WrestlePro event in which she defeated Angelina Love. According to the journalist Sean Ross Sapp, Dashwood's appearance drew a huge crowd and praise. Dashwood's independent circuit performances have included victories over Rachael Ellering on 11 February, and Deonna Purrazzo on 2 March 2018.

Dashwood announced after her surgery her wrestling comeback for independent promotions for the end of July 2019.

=== Ring of Honor (2018–2019) ===
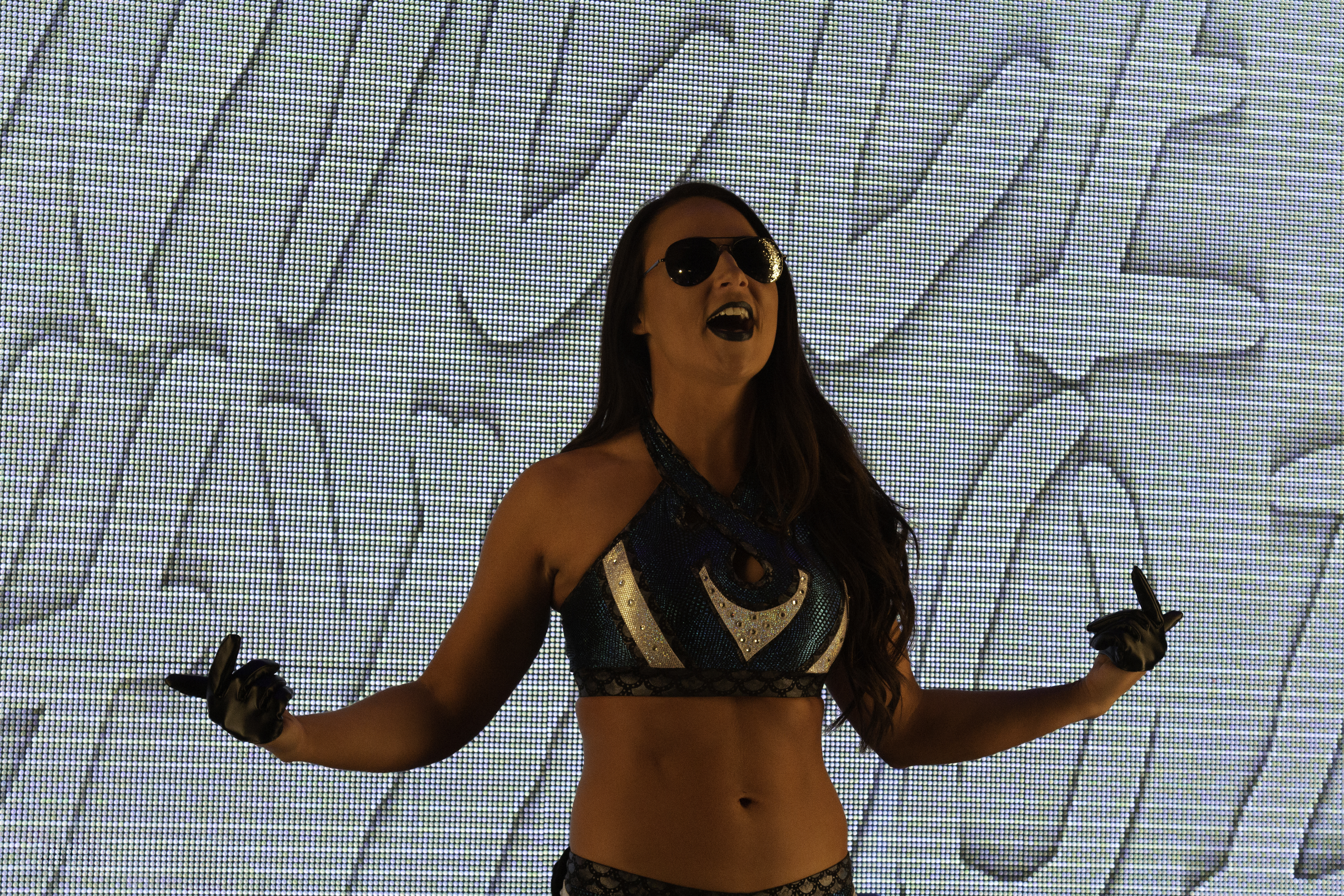
Dashwood making her entrance at ROH's and NJPW's War of the Worlds tour in May 2018

Dashwood made her debut in Ring of Honor (ROH) on 9 February 2018, at its Honor Reigns Supreme show. She was introduced as the newest member of ROH's Women of Honor division, and, the 16th and final entrant in ROH's tournament to crown the first Women of Honor Champion. Later that night, Dashwood teamed with Mandy Leon, defeating Kelly Klein and Stacy Shadows. With her new ring name, she also renamed some of her signature moves. The Dil-Emma (Rope hung Boston crab) became the Tarantula and the Emmamite Sandwich (Running crossbody to an opponent seated in the corner) became a Taste of Tenille.

At ROH Manhattan Mayhem (March 2018), Dashwood teamed with Deonna Purrazzo in a victory over Jenny Rose and Sumie Sakai. In the first round of the Women of Honor Championship tournament, Dashwood defeated Stacy Shadows. She defeated Brandi Rhodes in the second round at the ROH 16th Anniversary Show. Sumie Sakai then defeated Dashwood in the semi-finals and went on to win the tournament and the championship at ROH's Supercard of Honor XII 7 April 2018.

At ROH's State of the Art, on 17 June, Dashwood defeated Thunder Rosa. At the ROH Best in the World PPV she won her tag team match together with Sumie Sakai, Jenny Rose and Mayu Iwatani. On Death Before Dishonor XVI, Dashwood unsuccessfully challenged Sakai for the Women of Honor Championship. Backstage, after the match, Dashwood was attacked and injured, the attacker's identity remained unknown. The background of the injury storyline was that Dashwood needed time to recover from a full body flare up of an autoimmune disease and a dislocation, torn labrum and fracture of her shoulder, for which a surgery was needed. Ring of Honor announced that she will continue to work with the company during her recovery time. In an ROH TV episode in April 2019 Bully Ray put Dashwood backstage through a table, a storyline to write her off ROH.

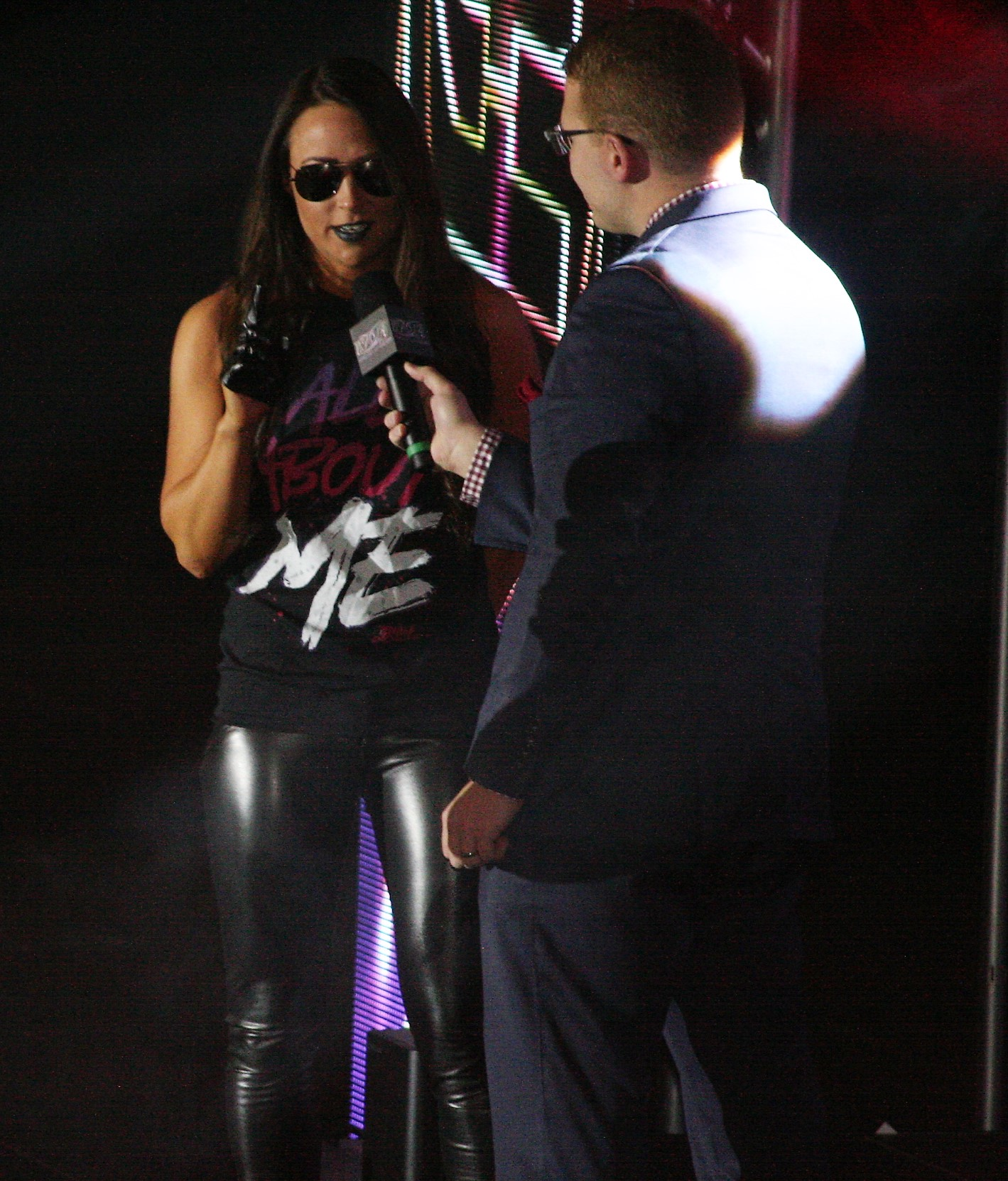
Tenille Dashwood being interviewed at Ring of Honor's Honor Reigns Supreme event in Concord, North Carolina, in 2017.

=== Impact Wrestling (2019–2022) ===
==== Championship pursuits (2019–2021) ====
On 29 July 2019, Impact Wrestling announced on Twitter that Dashwood had signed with the company. During her time with Impact, Dashwood also wrestled for All Elite Wrestling (AEW) at their All Out Buy In, participating in the women's Casino Battle Royal. On 30 August 2019 edition of Impact!, Dashwood made her TV debut with the company, confronting Knockouts Champion Taya Valkyrie before attacking her on the entrance ramp. Dashwood won the following matches against Kiera Hogan and Madison Rayne and challenged Valkyrie for the Knockouts Championship. Valkyrie retained against Dashwood as the champion at Bound For Glory, ending their feud. Dashwood won a rematch against Valkyrie later in 2020, but was attacked by her after the match.

After several months of hiatus during the COVID-19 pandemic, Dashwood returned on 1 September 2020 of Impact! by interrupting the Knockouts Champion Deonna Purrazzo's "Black Tie Affair", informing Purrazzo that she's going after her championship. On 22 September of Impact!, Dashwood defeated Jordynne Grace in the main event, the episode also tied the highest viewership of the year for Impact on AXS TV. Grace won the rematch the following week, resulting in a final match and win by Dashwood on 3 October at Victory Road. At Bound for Glory, Dashwood competed in the 20-wrestler Intergender Call Your Shot Gauntlet match, which was won by Rhino.

Dashwood then started a storyline with Alisha Edwards, when they teamed up on 17 November episode of Impact!, and were defeated by Havok and Nevaeh during the first round of the Knockouts Tag Team Championship Tournament. Dashwood and Kaleb With a K started to mocking Alisha, who was busy confronting Sami Callihan for attacking her husband Eddie, thus turning heel in the process. Their rivalry resumed at Final Resolution, where she and Kaleb won an intergender tag team match against the Edwards, and Dashwood defeated Alisha on 15 December episode of Impact!.

In early 2021, Dashwood began feuding with Decay after losing a match to Rosemary on 12 January episode of Impact!. At Hard To Kill, Dashwood and Kaleb lost to Crazzy Steve and Rosemary. The rivalry continued at No Surrender, where Dashwood teamed with XXXL (Ace Romero and Larry D) against Decay (Black Taurus, Crazzy Steve and Rosemary), which Decay won. Dashwood would then begin her next feud against Havok and Nevaeh, defeating both of them in singles matches on Impact!. It led to a match at Sacrifice, where Dashwood and Kaleb defeated Havok and Nevaeh. At Hardcore Justice, Dashwood defeated Havok, Rosemary, Jordynne Grace, Alisha and Su Yung to become the #1 contender for the Impact Knockouts Championship. She received the title opportunity against Deonna Purrazzo at Rebellion, which Dashwood lost due to interference by Kimber Lee. Taylor Wilde rescued Dashwood from a post-match assault by Kimber and Susan. This led to Wilde and Dashwood defeating Kimber and Susan at Under Siege.

==== The Influence (2021–2022) ====
Dashwood began feuding with Jordynne Grace and Rachael Ellering after inviting Ellering to join her as co-host of the All About Me talk show segment and Ellering bringing Grace with her, which Dashwood did not take lightly. This resulted in a match between Dashwood and Grace at Against All Odds, which Dashwood won. After trading wins with Ellering on Impact!, Dashwood and Kaleb lost a tag team match to Grace and Ellering on 15 July episode of Impact!. Two days later, at Slammiversary, Dashwood teamed with Brian Myers to compete against Matt Cardona and the returning Chelsea Green in a mixed tag team match, which Dashwood and Myers lost.

On 12 August episode of Impact!, Dashwood defeated Taylor Wilde with the assist of the returning Madison Rayne. As a result, Dashwood and Rayne formed an alliance called The Influence, alongside Kaleb. In their first match as a team, the Influence trio defeated Wilde in a handicap match on 26 August episode of Impact!. Dashwood would then lose a rematch to Wilde at Victory Road to end the rivalry.

Influence began pursuing the Impact Knockouts World Tag Team Championship as Dashwood and Rayne unsuccessfully challenged Decay (Havok and Rosemary) for the titles at Knockouts Knockdown. On 30 September episode of Impact!, Influence defeated Jordynne Grace and Rachael Ellering to earn a future shot at the Knockouts World Tag Team Championship. Dashwood also advanced in the tournament for the new Digital Media Championship by defeating Alisha on 20 October, thus qualifying for the six-way match to determine the inaugural champion at Bound for Glory. Dashwood would be unable to compete at the event and was replaced by her Influence teammate Madison Rayne, who failed to win the title.

Dashwood returned to action in December and Influence began feuding with The IInspiration (Cassie Lee and Jessie McKay) over the Knockouts World Tag Team Championship, defeating them for the titles at Sacrifice on 5 March 2022. At Multiverse of Matches, Influence retained the titles against Decay, Gisele Shaw and Lady Frost, and Savannah Evans and Tasha Steelz in a four-way match. At Rebellion, Influence successfully defended the titles against IInspiration in a rematch. Dashwood and Rayne lost the titles to Rosemary and Taya Valkyrie at Slammiversary. Shortly after the title loss, Gisele Shaw began teaming with Influence. At Against All Odds, Dashwood and Shaw unsuccessfully challenged Rosemary and Valkyrie for the titles. Dashwood's final match in Impact came against Masha Slamovich on 14 July episode of Impact!, which Dashwood lost.

=== Return to WWE (2022–2023) ===
On 28 October 2022 episode of SmackDown, Dashwood made her surprise return to WWE as a face for the first time in nearly 5 years, under her former ring name Emma, accepting Ronda Rousey's open challenge for the SmackDown Women's Championship, where she failed to win the title. On 21 January 2023 edition of SmackDown LowDown, Emma was announced to be in the 2023 Women's Royal Rumble Match, marking her first Royal Rumble appearance. Emma entered the match at number four, reuniting with former tag partner Dana Brooke during the match. She was eliminated by Dakota Kai from Damage CTRL after Brooke was eliminated. On 17 March 2023 episode of SmackDown, Emma teamed with Tegan Nox to challenge Liv Morgan and Raquel Rodriguez for a spot in the Women's WrestleMania Showcase match at Wrestlemania 39, though they were unsuccessful. As part of the 2023 WWE Draft, Emma was drafted to the Raw brand. On 3 July 2023 episode of Raw, Emma competed on the brand for the first time in over 5 years teaming with Nikki Cross in a losing effort. On 21 September 2023, Emma announced she had been released from WWE along with several other talents (including real-life partner Riddick Moss).

=== Return to independent circuit (2024–present) ===
In December 2023, Emma, once again going as Tenille Dashwood, stated in an Instagram post that she was unsure if she would "ever wrestle again". She would, however, make her return to in-ring competition on 12 April 2024 at Starrcast’s HER event in her home country of Australia, where she defeated Jessica Troy.

== Other media ==
Dashwood regularly appeared in the WWE web series The JBL and Cole Show, until its cancellation in June 2015. In September 2015, Dashwood began a cooking show on YouTube entitled Taste of Tenille, which ran till 2016 and at times also featured other wrestlers cooking with her. Dashwood continued the series in 2020.

Dashwood, as Emma, appeared in four WWE video games. She made her in-game debut in WWE 2K15 as a DLC character and appears in WWE 2K16, WWE 2K17 and WWE 2K18.

== Filmography ==
=== Film ===
Year	Title	Role	Notes
2024	The Charisma Killers	Deputy Harris	

=== Television ===
Year	Title	Role	Notes
2011	World of Hurt	Herself	Main (Season 1)
2015–2016	Total Divas	Herself	Guest (Seasons 3, 5–6); Recurring (Season 4): 12 episodes
2015	WWE Breaking Ground	Herself	1 episode
2015	Swerved	Herself	1 episode
2016	WWE 24	Herself	Episode: “Women’s Evolution”
2025	The Wanderer: Destinations Unknown	Herself	Season 1, episode 3

=== Podcasts ===
Year	Title	Role	Notes
2020	Ring The Belle	Herself	1 episode
2024	Chris Van Vliet	Herself	1 episode

== Personal life ==
On 30 June 2014, Dashwood was arrested in Hartford, Connecticut. She arrived backstage, but did not appear on the episode of Raw that aired live that night. Police released her after she agreed to appear at Hartford Community Court, which she did the following day on 1 July. According to her lawyer, she forgot to pay for an iPad case when using a self-checkout machine for her purchase at a Walmart. The journalists Bryan Alvarez and Sean Ross Sapp talked with loss-prevention managers at Walmart who, after looking into the case, confirmed that Dashwood did pay for her purchase, except for the one improperly scanned item. The employees criticized the arrest, stating that the clerk should have just reminded her that one item was not properly checked in instead, especially considering the low price of the forgotten item. She was ordered by the court to perform one day of community service and an online course, after which the charge was dismissed. WWE initially released Dashwood, but reversed their decision within just a few hours, once the announcement of her release sparked a large online backlash from WWE fans.

Dashwood revealed in August 2018 that she has fought the autoimmune disease psoriasis since she was fourteen years old. During her tour in Australia and New Zealand, in July 2018, a bad flare up happened, resulting in her wrestling in pain the following weeks. Dashwood explained that her greatest fear growing up with the condition was that she could not achieve her dream of becoming a professional wrestler. While she was initially reluctant to share the information about her disease, Dashwood explained in an interview she felt it was important so people know they are not alone with the disease and that there is no reason to be ashamed about it.

On 4 August 2022, Dashwood revealed that she is dating Michael Rallis, who is best known by his ring name Riddick Moss. On 3 June 2023, Dashwood and Rallis announced their engagement. The couple married on 8 March 2024. On 6 September 2024 Dashwood announced that she is expecting her first child with Rallis in 2025. On March 4, 2025, Dashwood gave birth to their first son. On May 31, 2025, Dashwood confirmed via social media that she now has American citizenship. On December 23, 2025, the couple announced on Instagram that they expecting their second child, due in June 2026. Dashwood and Rallis announced that their daughter was born in June 19.

== Championships and accomplishments ==
- America World Wrestling
  - AWW Women's World Championship (1 time)
- Extreme Canadian Championship Wrestling
  - ECCW Supergirls Championship (2 times)
- Impact Wrestling
  - Impact Knockouts World Tag Team Championship (1 time) – with Madison Rayne
- Pro Wrestling Alliance Queensland
  - Queen of the Warriors (2009)
- Pro Wrestling Illustrated
  - Ranked No. 31 of the top 50 female wrestlers in the PWI Female 50 in 2015
- Slam Wrestling Awards
  - Worst Tag Team Female (2021) – with Madison Rayne
- Swiss Wrestling Entertainment
  - SWE Ladies Championship (1 time)
- Women's Wrestling Fan Awards
  - Best Independent Wrestler of the Year (2018)
