= Knockouts Knockdown (2021) =

2021 Impact Wrestling event

- Promotional poster
- Promotion: Impact Wrestling
- Date: September 17, 2021 (aired October 9, 2021)
- City: Nashville, Tennessee
- Venue: Skyway Studios

Impact Plus Monthly Specials chronology
← Previous; Victory Road	Next → Turning Point

Knockouts Knockdown chronology
← Previous; 2017	Next → —

The 2021 Knockouts Knockdown was a professional wrestling event produced by Impact Wrestling. It was taped on September 17, 2021, at Skyway Studios in Nashville, Tennessee, and aired on October 9, 2021, on Impact Plus and YouTube. It was the sixth event in the Knockouts Knockdown chronology, the first event to be held since 2017, and the first to be held since the discontinuation of Impact's One Night Only series in 2019.

Ten matches were contested at the event. In the main event, Decay (Havok and Rosemary) defeated The Influence (Madison Rayne and Tenille Dashwood) to retain the Impact Knockouts Tag Team Championship. In other prominent matches, Mercedes Martinez won the Knockouts Knockdown tournament by defeating Tasha Steelz in the final, and Savannah Evans defeated Alisha Edwards, Jordynne Grace, and Kimber Lee in a Monster's Ball match in tribute to Shannon "Daffney" Spruill. The event also featured special appearances by Christy Hemme and Awesome Kong, the former announcing the latter's induction into the Impact Hall of Fame.

== Production ==
=== Background ===
Knockouts Knockdown was an annual professional wrestling event originally held by Impact Wrestling, then known as Total Nonstop Action Wrestling (TNA) from 2013 to 2017. It was traditionally an all-women's event showcasing the company's women's division, dubbed the Knockouts. Knockouts Knockdown was itself part of the One Night Only series of pre-recorded specials introduced in 2013, after the promotion discontinued most of its monthly pay-per-view events.

=== Storylines ===
The event featured professional wrestling matches that involved different wrestlers from pre-existing scripted feuds and storylines. Storylines were produced on Impact's weekly television program.

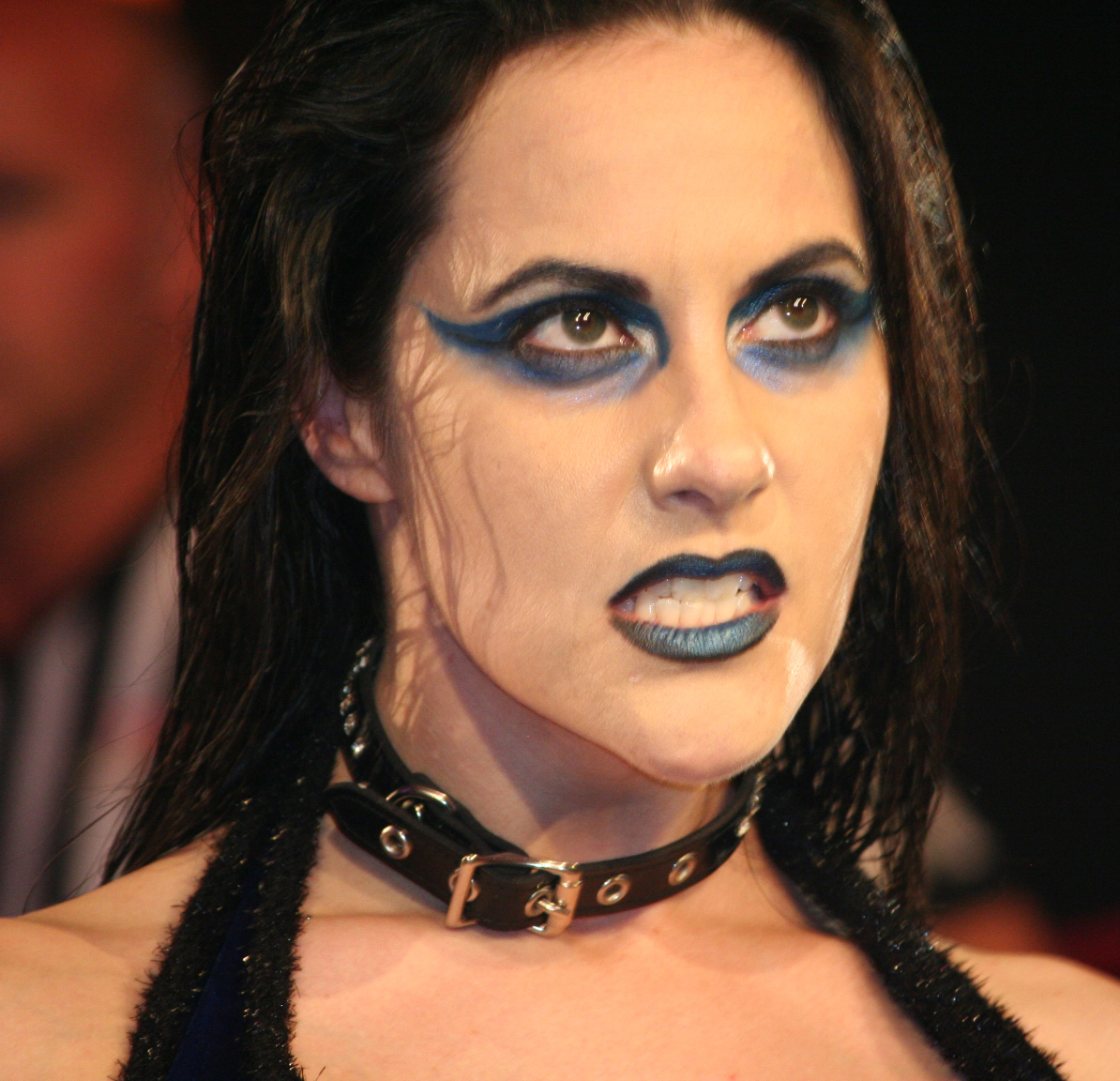
A Monster's Ball match was announced for the event in honor of Shannon "Daffney" Spruill.

On September 13, it was announced that the event would feature a Monster's Ball match in honor of Shannon Spruill, better known in professional wrestling as Daffney, who was one of the first women to compete in a Monster's Ball against Taylor Wilde. On the October 7 episode of Impact!, Alisha Edwards, Jordynne Grace, Kimber Lee, and Savannah Evans were announced as participants.

On the September 23 episode of Impact, producer Gail Kim announced an eight-woman, one night tournament for Knockouts Knockdown, where the winner would earn a future shot at the Impact Knockouts Championship. The tournament consisted of staple Impact Knockouts against talent from around the world. The following competitors would participate in the tournament:

- Mercedes Martinez
- Lady Frost
- Renee Michelle
- Chelsea Green
- Tasha Steelz
- Jamie Senegal
- Rachael Ellering
- Brandi Lauren

On the August 12 episode of Impact!, Madison Rayne came out of retirement and attacked Taylor Wilde to help Tenille Dashwood win the match. Since then, Rayne, Dashwood, and Kaleb with a K, now known as The Influence, would begin to set their sights on Decay's (Havok and Rosemary) Impact Knockouts Tag Team Championship, titles Dashwood had her eyes on for some time. They attempted to gain a title match at Knockouts Knockdown through Gail Kim on the September 23 episode of Impact!, but were instead booked for a number one contender's match next week against Jordynne Grace and Rachael Ellering, who joined Wilde in her feud with The Influence. Rayne and Dashwood would win, and were set to challenge Decay at Knockouts Knockdown.

On the September 23 episode of Impact!, it was announced that Deonna Purrazzo would defend the Impact Knockouts Championship at Bound for Glory against Mickie James. The following week on Impact!, Purrazzo would invade James' ranch and attack her, but James would continue to fight back. On the October 7 episode of Impact!, Impact EVP Scott D'Amore enacted a no-contact clause between the two, meaning they could not touch each other until Bound for Glory. That night, Gail Kim organized a "Pick Your Poison" series between James and Purrazzo, with the latter facing James' handpicked opponent, Masha Slamovich, at Knockouts Knockdown.

== Event ==
Other on-screen personnel
Commentators	Mickie James
Commentators	Veda Scott
Ring announcer	Melissa Santos
Interviewer	Gia Miller

The event began with Gail Kim and the Knockouts in the ring together, with the male members of the Impact roster standing outside the ring. Kim dedicated the show to all the wrestlers who have passed, and welcomed Lexie Fyfe, representing the friends and family of Daffney. Fyfe began a 10-bell salute in honor of Daffney and led a "Thank You Daffney" chant.

=== Preliminary matches ===
The opening match was a Knockouts Knockdown tournament quarterfinal between Lady Frost and Rachael Ellering. After trading wristlocks with each other, Ellering takes Frost down with a headlock and a shoulderblock for consecutive two counts. Frost counters Ellering's headlock with a headscissors and dropkicks her out of the ring, before Ellering returns with an uppercut for another two count. Ellering delivers a couple chops to Frost, with the latter giving back chops of her own, but Ellering counters an arm drag with a senton for two. After being whipped into the corner, Frost dropkicks Ellering and performs a cartwheel into a low dropkick, but only gets two. Following a handstand double knee and a standing moonsault for consecutive two counts, Frost climbs to the top but gets pulled down by Ellering, who misses a pump kick but lands a lariat that takes them both down. Both make their way up before landing strikes on each other in the corner, with Ellering hitting a spinning springboard leg drop on Frost, who manages to kick out at 2.9. Ellering gets kicked into the corner by Frost, who signals for the "Snowball Fight" but gets covered for two, and Ellering hits a spinebuster for another two. Frost heads outside the apron regarding issues with her back, uses the referee's call for separation to take out Ellering, and hits a blockbuster from the top for a near fall. Ellering blocks Frost on the top rope by putting her in the electric chair position, drops her on the turnbuckle and lands the "Boss Woman Slam" to win the match.

Next, Renee Michelle went up against Chelsea Green. The two get into a tight lockup that goes to the mat before separating from each other. A second lockup leads to Green dropping Michelle on her face, maintaining the advantage by applying several side headlock takeovers. Michelle takes control after Green rams her injured arm into the ring post, with the former slamming it on the side of the ring. Michelle gets a bridging top wristlock on Green's arm, who manages to fight out of it and land a pump kick. Green goes for multiple covers but Michelle kicks out of them, leading to a jumping enzuigiri for another kick out. Michelle escapes the "Unprettier" attempt and hits Green with a spinning back kick, but she manages to grab the bottom rope to break the count. Green gets a headbutt on Michelle and lands the "Unprettier" for the win to advance to the next round.

The third match saw Mercedes Martinez against Brandi Lauren. Martinez gets the early advantage with a running dropkick and a powerslam but Lauren kicks out at one. Lauren fights back with a neck snap and corners Martinez with a foot chokehold, who manages to escape on the apron and land a few blows on Lauren, setting her up for the "OG Drop" to get the win.

The fourth and final first round match of the tournament involved Jamie Senegal and Tasha Steelz. Both trade side headlocks with each other, Senegal getting the early advantage with an arm drag and a dropkick, sending Steelz outside on the apron. Senegal slides out of the ring but gets kicked by Steelz, who sends her into the ring post before pinning her in the ring for a two count. Senegal fights out of a chinlock and lands an enzuigiri on Steelz, who manages to trap and bend her on the ropes. Steelz gets some stomps on Senegal as she re-enters the ring, followed by a jumping forearm and uppercut in the corner, and lands a kick for a near fall. Steelz delivers forearms and jabs on Senegal, who fights back with a spinning side fist, an arm drag, and the Hosaka kick, but only gets a two count. Senegal gets another two count following a German suplex, but her attempt at a sliced bread gets countered, and Steelz delivers a few knee strikes followed by a springboard bulldog for a near fall. Senegal almost gets the win with a schoolgirl, but Steelz plants her with a cutter for another near fall. Steelz hits the "Blackout Crucifix Bomb" for three and advances to the next round.

The fifth match was contested between Deonna Purrazzo (with Matthew Rehwoldt) and Masha Slamovich. After some back-and-forth mat wrestling, the two then go through multiple Greco-Roman style pinning predicaments, with Slamovich laying Purrazzo out with a belly-to-belly and vertical suplex that forces her out of the ring. Slamovich lands a rolling senton on Rehwoldt, but gets caught with a kick from Purrazzo, who then works on Slamovich's arm after she re-enters the ring. Purrazzo gets out of a knife-edge pin and applies the Koji clutch on Slamovich, who manages to use her foot to reach the ropes. Slamovich hits a running spin kick on Purrazzo, followed by a knee strike and big boot in the corner, and a spinning heel kick for a two count. Purrazzo blocks a suplex attempt, hits a knee lift and a Russian legsweep on Slamovich before locking in the Fujiwara armbar, but she manages to slide out to hit a Snow Plow for a near fall. Slamovich goes for a piledriver attempt, but Purrazzo fights out of it to get a cross arm-breaker, which Slamovich breaks up by grabbing the ropes. Purrazzo locks in the "Venus de Milo" to make Slamovich submit and win the match.

The semi-finals of the tournament began with Mercedes Martinez taking on Rachael Ellering. After the two shook hands, they trade arm drags and headlocks with each other, before Ellering gets a head scissors takeover on Martinez, who gets out of it and slaps her. Martinez hits two butterfly suplexes but Ellering blocks a third attempt, leading to them exchanging strikes on the apron before Martinez lands a spear on Ellering. Martinez targets Ellering's ribs with strikes before hitting a DDT for a two count. Ellering counters the Fisherman buster with a small cradle for two, before landing a pump kick on Martinez for another near fall. Martinez hits a rope-assisted neckbreaker for two and applies a modified Regal Stretch on Ellering, who breaks it by grabbing the ropes. After some forearm shots in the corner, Martinez misses the big boot and gets caught by Ellering with strikes, a sling blade, an STO, and a springboard leg drop, but manages to kick out. Martinez hits a spinebuster for a near fall before getting hit by Ellering, who delivers a twisting suplex and a spinebuster for another near fall. Ellering gets the "Boss Woman Slam" on Martinez, who rolls out of the ring to avoid being pinned. Martinez hits the Fisherman buster and applies a guillotine choke on Ellering, forcing her to tap out. Both women embrace after the match.

In the other semi-final round match, Chelsea Green fought against Tasha Steelz. The two lock up before Green gets a waist lock takedown on Steelz and they exchange headlock takeovers with each other. After multiple near fall pin attempts, Steelz offers Green a handshake before hitting her stomach, but gets thrown with arm drags and a hesitation dropkick that sends her out of the ring. Green lands a dive on Steelz, who stops a second attempt with a forearm shot, and gets some kicks onto Green for a two count. After consecutive pin attempts, Green and Steelz collide with headbutts that knock them down. As both women get up and exchange strikes, Green gets a neckbreaker on Steelz who avoids a stomp on the apron, and hits a cutter that sends them to the floor. Back in the ring, Green hits a missile dropkick on Steelz but gets caught in the "Blackout Crucifix Bomb" for two, later hitting the "Unprettier" for another near fall. Steelz counters a flying crossbody into a pin attempt for two, then lands a pump kick on Green. On the top rope, Green attempts an avalanche "Unprettier" but Steelz throws her off, leading to a frog splash that gives Steelz the victory.

Christy Hemme made her way to the ring, announcing the next inductee into the Impact Hall of Fame, revealed to be Awesome Kong. Following a video package highlighting her run with the company, Kong appeared and went into the ring, giving a speech about opening the door for the next generation of Knockouts.

The eighth match involved Alisha Edwards, Jordynne Grace, Kimber Lee, and Savannah Evans in the Shannon "Daffney" Spruill Memorial Monster's Ball match. Alisha and Lee go to the outside, while Grace and Evans battle in the ring, the latter hitting a pop-up powerbomb. Lee uses a pool cue on Evans, heads outside to grab a trash can to put over her head, and hits Evans with a crowbar before getting her pin attempt broken up by Alisha. Lee sets up a barbed wire-wrapped chair in the corner but Alisha sends her face into it. Alisha brings in Kenny (her husband Eddie's kendo stick) and Kendra (her own kendo stick; wrapped in barbed wire) into the ring, and uses them to repeatedly attack Lee. Grace lands a double knee drop on both Evans and Alisha in the corner, before hitting a Vader Bomb on Evans for two. As Grace brings a powerlifting plate into the ring, Lee takes her out with some kicks for a near fall, before bringing in a bag of thumbtacks and emptying them in the ring. Lee attempts to suplex Grace onto the thumbtacks, but she instead gets hoisted up into a muscle buster and gets forced onto them. Alisha enters the ring to hit the Downward Spiral on Grace for two, goes for a DDT on the plate but gets face-planted onto it instead. Evans throws chalk into Grace's face and hits a full nelson slam on Alisha to win the match.

In the penultimate match, Mercedes Martinez and Tasha Steelz compete in the finals of the Knockouts Knockdown tournament, where the winner receives a future Knockouts Championship match. Martinez brushes off Steelz's attacks with a right hand blow followed by an overhead slam. After some strikes in the corner, Martinez lays out Steelz with a delayed vertical suplex and three butterfly suplexes for two. Steelz fights back with a head scissors takedown and a tornado DDT on Martinez for two. Steelz counters the "OG Drop" into a sunset flip before hitting Martinez with a cutter. Both women are on the top rope, Steelz escapes from it to land a hurricanrana on Martinez, followed by a Stratusfaction for a near fall. Steelz goes for a moonsault attempt, but Martinez roll out on the apron, leaving her open to the "OG Drop" that allows Martinez to win the Knockouts Knockdown tournament. After the match, Gail Kim presents Martinez with the trophy.

=== Main event ===
In the main event, Decay (Havok and Rosemary) (with Black Taurus and Crazzy Steve) defended the Knockouts Tag Team Championship against The Influence (Madison Rayne and Tenille Dashwood) (with Kaleb with a K). Rosemary and Rayne start things off, the former landing a couple lariats on the latter, biting on her face and hitting a T-Bone suplex for a two count. Havok tags in, and she and Rosemary hit a double clothesline on Rayne, who manages to tag Dashwood in the match. Havok rag dolls Dashwood by the hair around the ring, hits a backbreaker clothesline combo for two, and tags in Rosemary to deliver smashes in the corner. After applying the "Upside Down", Rosemary's leg is grabbed by Kaleb at ringside, who gets chased and allows Rayne to hit a clothesline. The Influence take the advantage, with Rayne delivering knee strikes and Dashwood hitting a neckbreaker on Rosemary, both getting consecutive two counts. Rosemary and Dashwood collide into each other with double clotheslines that takes them down. Havok and Rayne get the tag from their respective partners, the former hitting offensive shots to the latter, before landing multiple boots to the face in the corner. Kaleb distracts Rosemary as she carries Rayne on her shoulders, allowing Dashwood to save her partner and send Rosemary into Havok, before Kaleb gets sent to the back by Taurus and Steve. The Influence hit "The Collab" on Rosemary, but the referee is distracted by the commotion on the outside, allowing Havok to knock them into each other. Havok and Rosemary hit a Russian legsweep/Spear combo on Rayne to win the match and retain their titles.

Before the event ended, Impact announced that The IInspiration (Cassie Lee and Jessica McKay), formerly The IIconics (Peyton Royce and Billie Kay) in WWE, would make their debut for the promotion at Bound for Glory.

== Reception ==
Steve Cook of 411Mania gave the event an 8 out of 10. He wrote: "Good showing for the ladies up & down the card tonight, and if I wasn't excited enough about things...THE IINSPIRATION IS COMING! Any promotion smart enough to book Jessie & Cassie is going to get nothing but hype from me. All hail the Knockouts." Bob Kapur of Slam Wrestling was mixed about the tournament, praising Martinez's bouts and her winning the tournament, but found the other matches to be fine overall, giving note of "Senegal's limitations" during her quarterfinal round with Steelz. He praised the Monster's Ball match for being "a fun little brawl" but considered the main event to be "a regular TV match" that felt like "a bit of an underwhelming way to end the show", despite its good quality. Kapur gave the event 4 out of 5 stars and wrote that "it's great to see the company's commitment to the division continues and gives women the opportunity to shine brightly."

== Aftermath ==
Gail Kim came out after the Pick Your Poison match in an unaired segment and offered Masha Slamovich a contract with Impact Wrestling.

On October 13, Impact announced that The IInspiration will be challenging Decay for the Impact Knockouts Tag Team Championship at Bound for Glory.

== Results ==
No.	Results	Stipulations	Times
1	Rachael Ellering defeated Lady Frost by pinfall	Knockouts Knockdown tournament quarterfinals	11:54
2	Chelsea Green defeated Renee Michelle by pinfall	Knockouts Knockdown tournament quarterfinals	8:28
3	Mercedes Martinez defeated Brandi Lauren by pinfall	Knockouts Knockdown tournament quarterfinals	2:09
4	Tasha Steelz defeated Jamie Senegal by pinfall	Knockouts Knockdown tournament quarterfinals	11:04
5	Deonna Purrazzo (with Matthew Rehwoldt) defeated Masha Slamovich by submission	Pick Your Poison match Mickie James handpicked Purrazzo's opponent	12:01
6	Mercedes Martinez defeated Rachael Ellering by submission	Knockouts Knockdown tournament semifinals	12:30
7	Tasha Steelz defeated Chelsea Green by pinfall	Knockouts Knockdown tournament semifinals	12:23
8	Savannah Evans defeated Alisha Edwards, Jordynne Grace, and Kimber Lee by pinfall	Shannon "Daffney" Spruill Memorial Monster's Ball match	10:04
9	Mercedes Martinez defeated Tasha Steelz by pinfall	Knockouts Knockdown tournament final The winner will receive a future Impact Knockouts Championship match.	10:58
10	Decay (Havok and Rosemary) (c) (with Black Taurus and Crazzy Steve) defeated The Influence (Madison Rayne and Tenille Dashwood) (with Kaleb with a K) by pinfall	Tag team match for the Impact Knockouts Tag Team Championship	10:43
(c) / – the champion(s) heading into the match

=== Knockouts Knockdown Tournament ===
Quarter-finals
Tasha Steelz	Pin
Jamie Senegal	11:04
Chelsea Green	Pin
Renee Michelle	8:28
Rachael Ellering	Pin
Lady Frost	11:54
Brandi Lauren	2:09
Mercedes Martinez	Pin

Semi-finals
Tasha Steelz	Pin
Chelsea Green	12:23
Rachael Ellering	12:30
Mercedes Martinez	Sub

Final
Tasha Steelz	10:58
Mercedes Martinez	Pin
