= Rachael Ellering =

American professional wrestler

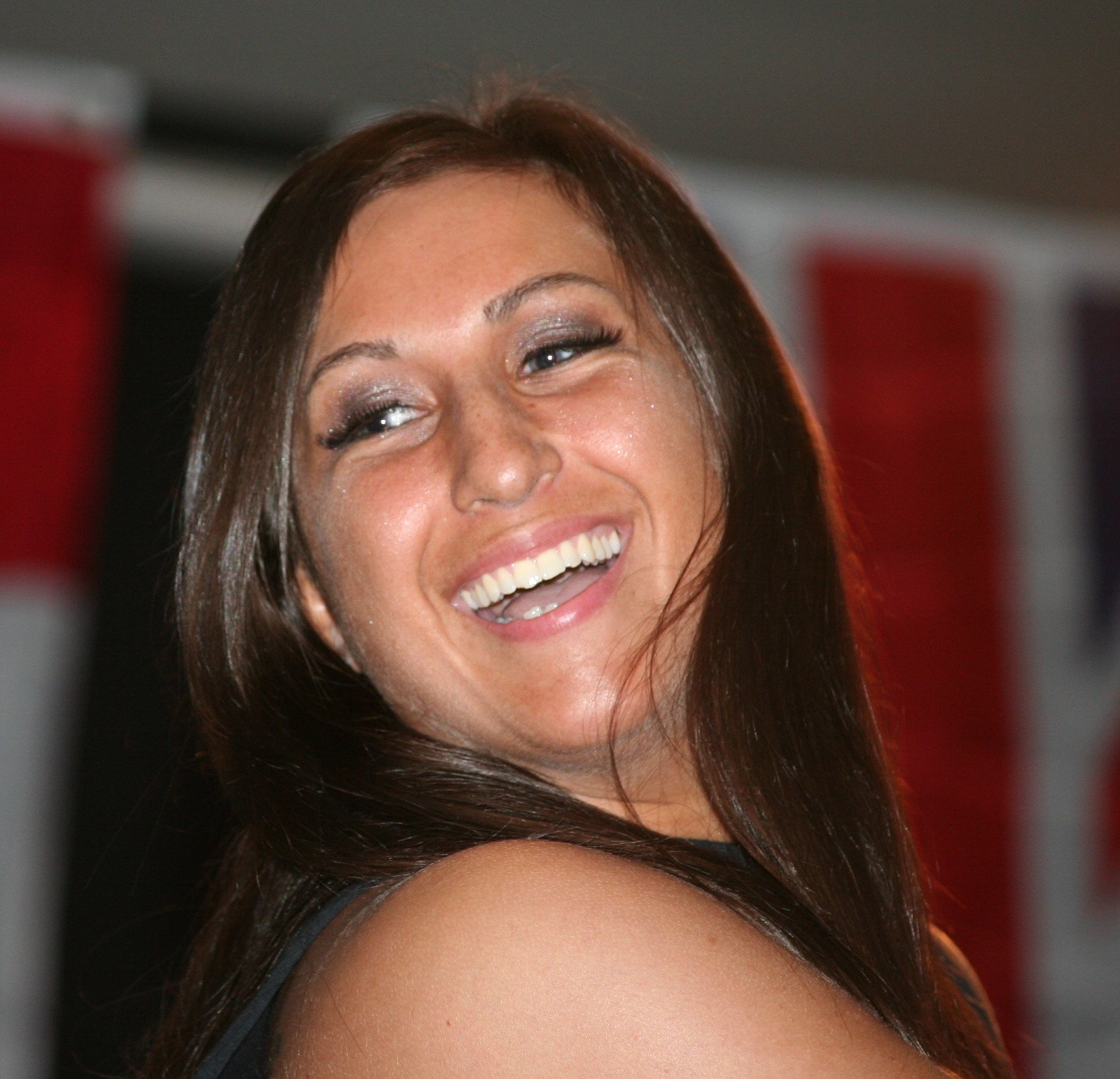
- Ellering in February 2017

Personal information
- Born: December 28, 1992 (age 33) Sauk Centre, Minnesota, U.S.
- Family: Paul Ellering (father); Debra Ellering-Randall (mother)

Professional wrestling career
- Ring name(s): Rachael Ellering; Rachael Evers; Rachael Fazio
- Billed height: 5 ft 6 in (168 cm)
- Billed from: St. Paul, Minnesota, United States
- Trained by: Lance Storm
- Debut: November 21, 2015

Rachael Ellering (born December 28, 1992) is an American professional wrestler signed to Ring of Honor (ROH) and sister promotion All Elite Wrestling (AEW). She is also known for her work in Impact Wrestling, where she is a former Impact Knockouts Tag Team Champion. She has also worked in WWE under the ring name Rachael Evers.

== Professional wrestling career ==
=== Early career (2015–2016) ===
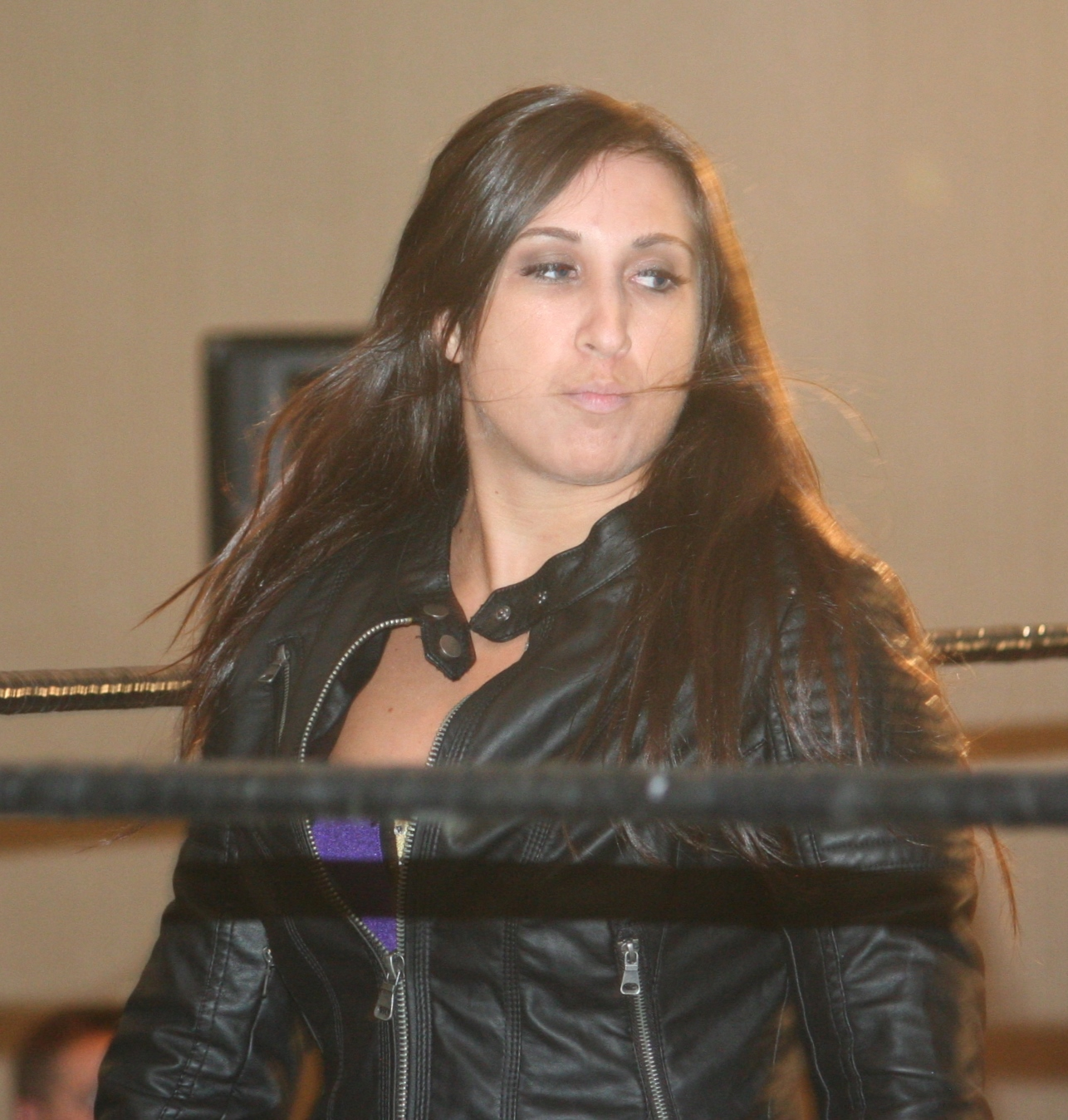
Ellering at a 2016 independent show

Ellering trained at the Storm Wrestling Academy and graduated in December 2015. She went on to debut in Prairie Wrestling Alliance on November 21, 2015, in a tag team match with Lance Storm against Brett Morgan and Gisele Shaw. Ellering made her Shine Wrestling debut at Shine 34 in a match won by Tessa Blanchard. In a rematch at Shine 35, Ellering won.

=== WWE (2016–2020) ===
Ellering made her WWE debut on NXT at the April 28, 2016, taping, in a match won by Alexa Bliss. Ellering returned to NXT on the September 14 episode under the name Rachael Fazio, losing a match to Liv Morgan, and on November 11, losing to Ember Moon. On May 3, 2017, Ellering participated in a number one contender's battle royal, but was eliminated by Aliyah. On the June 21 episode, she faced Sonya Deville in a losing effort.

On July 13, 2017, Ellering, under the ring name Rachael Evers, entered the Mae Young Classic tournament, defeating Marti Belle in her first round match. The following day, Evers was eliminated from the tournament in the second round by Abbey Laith. In 2018, Evers was announced as one of the competitors in the 2nd Mae Young Classic. she was defeated by the villainous Hiroyo Matsumoto in the opening round.

In January 2019 it was revealed that Evers signed with WWE and would start appearing on NXT. Shortly thereafter she began appearing at NXT events under her real name. On July 28, 2019, Ellering suffered a torn ACL at an NXT live event, sidelining her for over a year. In May 2020, Ellering was released from her WWE contract along with several other wrestlers, due to budget cuts stemming from the COVID-19 pandemic.

=== Ring of Honor (2016, 2023–present) ===
On the October 26th, 2016 episode of Ring of Honor's Women of Honor wednesdays, Racheal Ellering made her ROH Women of Honor debut in a one-on-one match against Kennadi Brink, but lost after being hit with Brink's finisher. On the June 6, 2023, episode of Ring of Honor Wrestling, Ellering unsuccessfully challenged Willow Nightingale for the Strong Women's Championship. On December 27, 2023 Rachael Ellering entered the inaugural ROH Women's World Television Championship tournament and faced Leyla Hirsch in the first round, but was unsuccessful.

=== Impact Wrestling (2017) ===
Ellering has made appearances in Impact Wrestling. her first appearance was on the March 2, 2017 television taping, competing in a match against Sienna in a losing effort. The following day, Ellering competed in the company's One Night Only pay-per-view series, Knockouts Knockdown 2017, against Laurel Van Ness in another losing effort.

=== World Wonder Ring Stardom (2017–2018) ===
Ellering made her World Wonder Ring Stardom debut on December 24, 2017, by teaming with Scarlett to defeat AZM and Momo Watanabe.

In August and September 2018, Ellering competed in the Red Stars block of the 2018 5 Star Grand Prix, in which she scored a total of nine points.

=== All Elite Wrestling (2020, 2024–present) ===
Ellering made her All Elite Wrestling debut on August 10 as part of the Women's Tag Team Cup Tournament shown on the AEW YouTube Channel. In this, she partnered with AEW Spanish commentator and former WWE wrestler and backstage personality Dasha Gonzalez in a losing effort against Diamante and Ivelisse Vélez. The following night, Ellering made her AEW Dark debut on the August 11 episode in a losing effort against Penelope Ford. On the July 12 episode of Rampage, Ellering returned to AEW for the first time in four years in a losing effort against Thunder Rosa.

=== Return to Impact Wrestling (2021–2022) ===
Ellering made her debut on the April 22, 2021, episode of Impact!, saving Jordynne Grace from a beat down by the Knockouts Tag Team Champions Fire 'N Flava (Kiera Hogan and Tasha Steelz), and was announced by Grace that she would be her tag team partner at Rebellion. Three days later at the event, Ellering and Grace defeated Fire 'N Flava to win the Knockouts tag titles for the first time. On May 15, at Under Siege, they dropped the titles back to Fire 'N Flava. Five days later, Ellering was challenged to a match by Grace, and she defeated her. On the June 3 episode of Impact!, she and Grace challenged Fire 'N Flava to a rematch for the Knockout Tag Team Championship, but failed to regain them. Two weeks later, Ellering lost to Tenille Dashwood after being blinded by Kaleb with a K's camera light.

On July 31 at Homecoming, Ellering teamed with Tommy Dreamer to compete in a tournament to crown a Homecoming King and Queen, beating Brian Myers and Missy Hyatt in the first round but lost to Decay (Crazzy Steve and Rosemary) in the semifinals. In October, she competed in the Knockouts Knockdown tournament, to determine who will get a future shot at the Knockouts Championship, defeating Lady Frost in the quarterfinals but lost to eventual winner Mercedes Martinez in the semifinals. At Bound for Glory, Ellering participated in the Call Your Shot Gauntlet match, where the winner could choose any championship match of their choice, eliminating Savannah Evans but was eliminated by Tasha Steelz.

On February 18, 2022, it was confirmed that Ellering was no longer working with Impact Wrestling.

== Personal life ==
Ellering is the second daughter of professional wrestling manager Paul Ellering. She is currently engaged to fellow professional wrestler Chris Hero.

== Championships and accomplishments ==
=== Powerlifting ===
- World Powerlifting Federation
  - 2014 Bronze Medalist

=== Professional wrestling ===
- Impact Wrestling
  - Impact Knockouts Tag Team Championship (1 time) – with Jordynne Grace
  - Impact Year End Award (1 time)
    - Knockouts Tag Team of the Year (2021) – with Jordynne Grace
- Maverick Pro Wrestling
  - MPW Women's Championship (1 time)
- Pro Wrestling Illustrated
  - Ranked No. 87 of the top 100 female wrestlers in the PWI Female 100 in 2019
- Pro Wrestling Magic
  - PWM Women's Championship (1 time)
- Resistance Pro Wrestling
  - RPW Women's Title Tournament (2016)
  - RPW Women's Championship (1 time)
- WrestleCircus
  - WrestleCircus Lady of the Ring Championship (1 time)
