= Lady Frost =

American professional wrestler

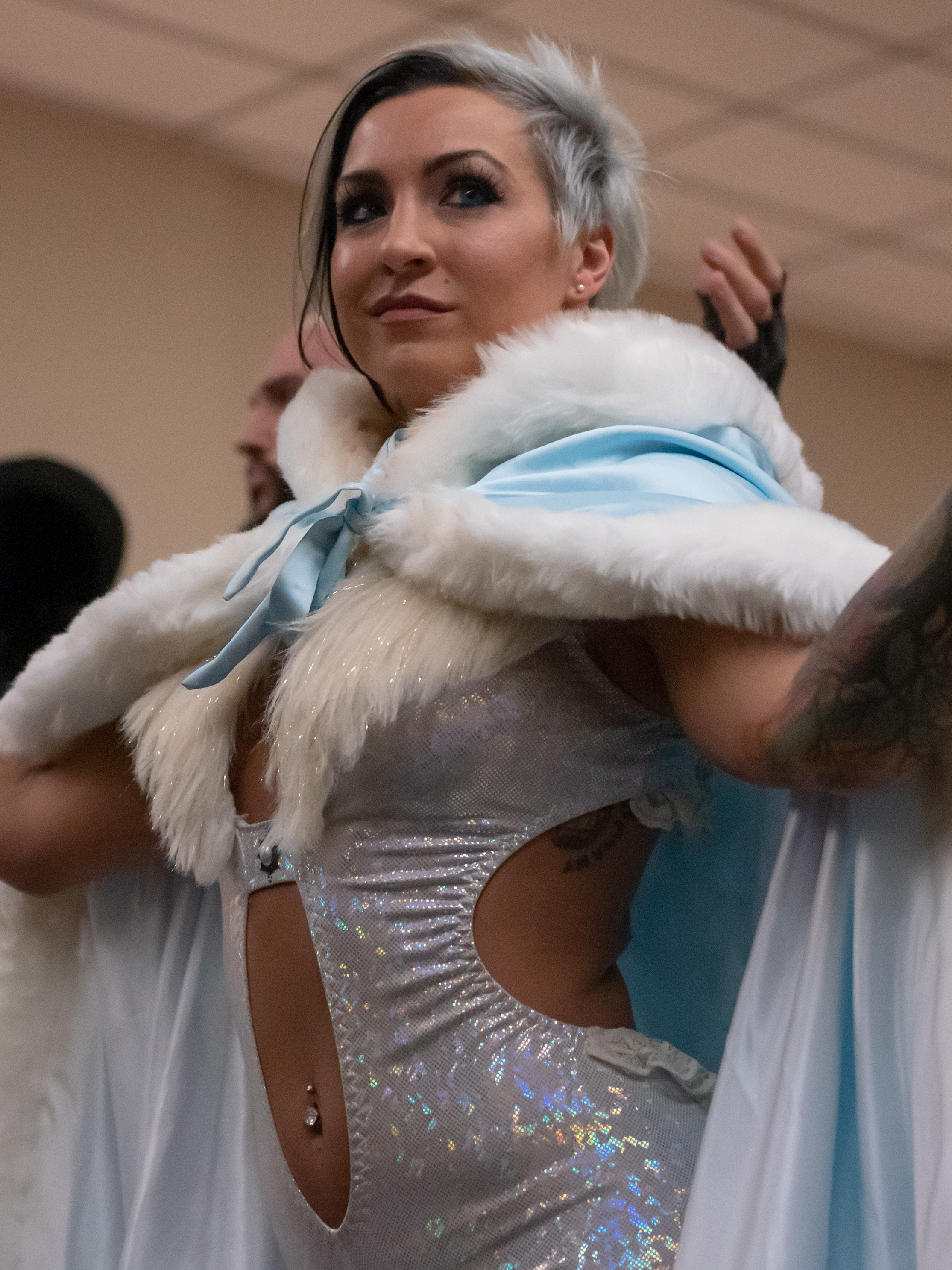
- Lady Frost in 2019

Personal information
- Born: Brittany Rae Steding; March 14, 1985 (age 41) Erie, Pennsylvania, U.S.
- Family: Tony Marino (grandfather)

Professional wrestling career
- Ring name(s): Ellie Fredericks; Jamie Frost; Lady Frost; Marmalade; The Red Queen
- Billed from: "Imperial, Iceland"
- Trained by: Brandon K Mike Quackenbush; The Wrestle Factory
- Debut: March 26, 2018

Brittany Rae Steding (born March 14, 1985), better known by the ring name Lady Frost, is an American professional wrestler. She performs on the independent circuit. She is best known for her time in All Elite Wrestling (AEW), Major League Wrestling (MLW), and Ring of Honor (ROH).

== Professional wrestling career ==
=== WWE (2018) ===
Steding made her professional wrestling debut for WWE on the March 26, 2018 episode of Raw, under the ring name "Jamie Frost", where she lost to Asuka in a squash match.

=== Independent circuit (2018–present) ===
Steding began her independent career as the valet of her then real-life husband Victor Benjamin. Later, the two would wrestle as a tag team under the name "Pretty Proper", with Steding adopting the ring name "Lady Frost". On September 15, 2018, Frost had her first title match when she challenged LuFisto for the Rogue Women Warriors Championship at an Atomic Championship Wrestling event but was unsuccessful.

In March 2019, Frost made her Chikara debut, participating in the annual Young Lions Cup tournament. On November 2, Frost made her debut for Shimmer Women Athletes during the taping of Volume 114, where she defeated Jenna Lynn in a dark match. She later lost on the same day to Thunderkitty during the taping of Volume 115.

In 2021, Frost won her first title in wrestling, defeating Heather Monroe to become Hurricane Pro Wrestling's women's champion.

=== All Elite Wrestling / Ring of Honor (2020, 2023–2026) ===
Frost made her All Elite Wrestling (AEW) debut during the November 24, 2020 episode of AEW Dark, where she and Jennacide lost to the team of Diamante and Ivelisse. She made another appearance on the following week's episode of Dark, where she lost to Red Velvet.

On May 24, 2023, Frost made her debut on AEW's Dynamite program, in a loss to Taya Valkyrie. On June 29, Frost unsuccessfully challenged Kris Statlander for the TBS Championship on Collision. On November 25 she unsuccessfully challenged Julia Hart for the TBS Championship on Collision. During year 2023 Lady Frost debuted in AEW's sister promotion Ring of Honor (ROH) and had wrestled in several matches off-and-on in ROH ever since.

On December 27, 2023 it was announced that Lady Frost will participate in the inaugural ROH Women's World Television Championship tournament but never participated and was replaced in the tournament due to her having a tour in Mexico.

On April 1, 2026, Frost's AEW contract expired and was not renewed.

=== National Wrestling Alliance (2021) ===
On August 7, 2021, the National Wrestling Alliance (NWA) confirmed that Frost would appear on their women's pay-per-view NWA EmPowerrr, as a participant in the main event NWA Women's Invitational Cup Gauntlet match. At the event, Frost was eliminated by Debbie Malenko from the match. On August 29 at the NWA 73rd Anniversary Show, Frost and The Hex (Allysin Kay and Marti Belle) defeated the team of Jennacide, Paola Mayfield, and Taryn Terrell during the event's pre-show.

=== Impact Wrestling (2021–2022) ===
Frost made her Impact Wrestling debut during the July 8, 2021 episode of the promotion's titular television series, unsuccessfully answering Impact Knockouts Champion Deonna Purrazzo's open challenge. On September 28, Impact Wrestling announced that Frost would compete in the 2021 Knockouts Knockdown Tournament. Frost was eliminated from the tournament in the first round after losing to Rachael Ellering. During the December 9 episode of Impact!, after Frost defeated Kimber Lee, it was revealed that she had become an official Knockout and would be the first entrant of the inaugural Knockouts Ultimate X match at Hard to Kill. The match would be won by Tasha Steelz.

On the January 20, 2022 episode of Before the Impact, Frost challenged Jordynne Grace for the Impact Digital Media Championship, but was unsuccessful. On April 20, Frost revealed that she had suffered an injury which would require surgery. On June 23, Frost announced on her Twitter account that she asked for her release from Impact Wrestling, however, her request was reportedly denied. On November 9, Frost was granted her release.

=== Consejo Mundial de Lucha Libre (2022, 2025) ===
On October 24, 2022, Frost made her debut for Consejo Mundial de Lucha Libre (CMLL), teaming with Alex Gracia and Ivelisse to defeat Hikari Shimizu, Mei Suruga, and Tae Honma. On October 28, Frost participated in the 2022 CMLL International Women's Gran Prix, reaching the final two before being defeated by Dalys la Caribeña. In December, Frost and Dalys won CMLL's women's Copa Bicentenario tournament.

On February 19, 2025, it was announced that Taya will debut and replace Red Velvet due to her injury and will team up with Lady Frost on March 7 in a tournament for the vacant CMLL World Women's Tag Team Championship. Taya and Frost defeated Hera and Olympia in the first tournament round and in the second round they defeated Skadi and Kira to become one ofwinning the finalists of the tournament. Taya and Frost defeated Zeuxis and India Sioux in the Arena Coliseo. On March 21, 2025 in Homenaje a Dos Leyendas (2025) they were defeated by La Jarochita and Lluvia for the vacant CMLL World Women's Tag Team Championship. On April 24, 2025, it was announced that Starkz would debut and replace Taya Valkyrie due to her injury and would team up with Lady Frost. On April 25, 2025, Starkz and Lady Frost defeated Las Infernales (Zeuxis and Dark Silueta) at the 69th anniversary of the Arena México. On April 26, 2025, Starkz and Lady Frost lost to Zeuxis and La Jarochita at the Arena Coliseo.

=== Major League Wrestling (2026) ===
Immediately after leaving AEW, Frost announced that she had signed with Major League Wrestling (MLW) on April 1, 2026. She made her debut on April 12 (aired August 8) at Blood and Thunder, defeating Shotzi and Scarlett Bordeaux. In October 2026, It was reported that Frost would be leaving MLW.

== Personal life ==
Steding was married to fellow professional wrestler Victor Benjamin, with the two of them finalizing their divorce in June 2025. Steding is the granddaughter of the wrestler Tony Marino.

== Championships and accomplishments ==
- Consejo Mundial de Lucha Libre
  - Copa Bicentenario (2022) – with Dalys La Caribeña
- Hurricane Pro Wrestling
  - Hurricane Pro Women's Championship (1 time)
- Pro Wrestling Illustrated
  - Ranked No. 52 of the top 150 female singles wrestlers in the PWI Women's 150 in 2021
- WrestlePro
  - WrestlePro Women's Championship (2 time, current)
  - WrestlePro Women's Championship Tournament (2022)
