= BRCW/CCW: Yeow! A Tribute to Jaka =

BRCW/CCW: YEOW!
- Promotional poster
- Promotion(s): Boca Raton Championship Wrestling; Coastal Championship Wrestling
- Date: January 17, 2026
- City: Kissimmee, Florida
- Venue: Sun On The Beach
- Tagline: A Tribute to Jaka

BRCW/CCW: YEOW! A Tribute to Jaka was a professional wrestling supercard memorial show for Jaka, co-promoted by the American-indie wrestling promotion Boca Raton Championship Wrestling (BRCW) and Coastal Championship Wrestling (CCW). The event took place on January 17, 2026 at Sun On The Beach in Kissimmee, Florida organized by BRCW owner Matthew Maschler. The event marked the second collaborative event held by the BRCW and CCW and was streamed live on YouTube.

In the main event, Catch Point (Chris Dickinson, Drew Gulak, and Matt Riddle) defeated Jon Davis and The WorkHorsemen (Anthony Henry and JD Drake) in a six-man tag team match. In other prominent matches, Ortiz and Steve Mack picked defeated The Rapture. The Hex (Allysin Kay and Marti Belle) defeated Leva Bates and Sofia Castillo, and Channing Decker scored a singles victory over Serpentico.

== Background ==
=== Production ===
On 07 September 2025, Jaka suffered a heart attack and passed away. His last wrestling appearance was on BRCW Challenge Accepted 2 in March against Jonny Fairplay and Oddyssey . BRCW founder Matthew Maschler along with CCW's owner organised the event in honour of Jonathan Echevarria. The show was named YEOW! A Tribute to Jaka. The show included a six man tag team match where Sons Of Boca (Cezar Bononi, Noah Kekoa & Sean Maluta) (w/Neil The Heel) were against Bull James, Leon Ruff & Madman Fulton. A Four Way Match featured Suge D defeating Joey Janela, Martin Stone and TJ Marconi. Entire show was streamed online on CCW's Youtube channel.

=== Storylines ===
YEOW! A Tribute to Jaka Show featured eleven professional wrestling matches that involved different wrestlers, some with pre-existing scripted feuds and storylines. Wrestlers portrayed villains, heroes, or less distinguishable characters in scripted events that built tension and culminated in a wrestling match or series of matches.

== Results ==
No.	Results	Stipulations	Times
1	Ozzy Kilmeister defeated CJ O'Doyle	Singles Match	4:08
2	Sons Of Boca (Cezar Bononi, Kona Reeves & Sean Maluta)(w/Neil The Heel) defeated Bull James, Leon Ruff & Madman Fulton	Six Man Tag Team Match	6:02
3	Suge D defeated Joey Janela and Martin Stone and TJ Marconi	Four Way Match	4:41
4	Chocolit Stud, Gabriel Black & Skitz defeated Drennen, Rico De La Vega & Vertigo	Six Man Tag Team Match	4:52
5	Violence Is Forever (Dominic Garrini & Kevin Ku) defeated Matt Taven & Stallion Rogers	Tag Team Match	9:08
6	Jervis Cottonbelly defeated Pinkie Sanchez (w/Christina Diamond)	Singles Match	2:32
7	Jervis Cottonbelly, Sammi Chaos & Savannah Thorne defeated Avery Good, Castle Rolfenstein & Pinkie Sanchez	Six Man Tag Team Match	7:36
8	Channing Decker defeated Serpentico	Singles Match	10:51
9	The Hex (Allysin Kay & Marti Belle) defeated Leva Bates & Sofia Castillo	Tag Team Match	10:12
10	Ortiz & Steve Mack (w/Kathleen Ecehevarria) defeated The Rapture (Jay Sky & Richard Adonis)	Tag Team Match	11:29
11	Catch Point (Chris Dickinson, Drew Gulak & Matt Riddle) defeated Jon Davis & The WorkHorsemen (Anthony Henry & JD Drake) (w/Amber Young)	Six Man Tag Team Match	19:55
