= BRCW Festival of Fights =

- Promotion: Boca Raton Championship Wrestling
- Date: December 15, 2024
- City: Boca Raton, Florida
- Venue: VIP Ballroom At CBI
- Attendance: 350-450

Pay-per-view chronology
| ← Previous — | Next → BRCW/CCW: Yeow! A Tribute to Jaka |

BRCW Festival of Fights was a professional wrestling supercard promoted by the American-indie wrestling promotion Boca Raton Championship Wrestling (BRCW). The event took place on December 15, 2024 at VIP Ballroom in Boca Raton, Florida organized by BRCW owner Matthew Maschler.

== Production ==
=== Storylines ===
Festival of Fights featured a total of eight different professional wrestling matches involving different wrestlers from pre-existing feuds. Wrestlers followed a series of events that built tension and culminated in a wrestling match or series of matches.

Several BRCW championships were featured. The BRCW Cruiserweight Championship was defended in a singles match between champion Neil The Heel and Alan Martinez, while the BRCW Tag Team Championship was defended by Matt Riddle and Stallion Rogers against Anthony Greene and Matt Taven.

Also on the card, Ariel Levy defeated Cha Cha Charlie, Lakay, Steve Maclin and Tito Lincoln in a fatal five way match, with differing stipulations.

Most notably, the event included AEW's Big Boom A. J. confronted another AEW star Q. T. Marshall during his match against MJF. After striking Marshall with a punch near the end of the bout, A. J. had a tense staredown with MJF, with the two exchanging words before A. J. walked away. MJF then resumed the match and defeated Marshall via pinfall.

== Results ==
| No. | Results | Stipulations | Times |
|---|---|---|---|
| 1 | Ariel Levy defeated Cha Cha Charlie and Lakay and Steve Maclin and Tito Lincoln | Scramble Match five way | — |
| 2 | Madman Fulton defeated Chris Masters | Singles match | 12:05 |
| 3 | Neil The Heel (c) defeated Alan Martinez | Singles match, BRCW Cruiserweight Championship | 8:16 |
| 4 | The Righteous (Dutch & Vincent) defeated Better Together (Hadar Horvitz & Ori Gold) (w/Missy Hyatt) | Spin The Dreidel Match | 7:10 |
| 5 | Colt Cabana defeated Bull James | Singles match | 9:03 |
| 6 | Deonna Purrazzo defeated Chelsea Durden | Singles match | 7:21 |
| 7 | Matt Riddle and Stallion Rogers (c) defeated Anthony Greene and Matt Taven | Tag team match | 11:34 |
| 8 | MJF defeated QT Marshall | Singles match | 13:58 |
(c) / – the champion(s) heading into the match
