= Bull Dempsey =

American professional wrestler (born 1988)

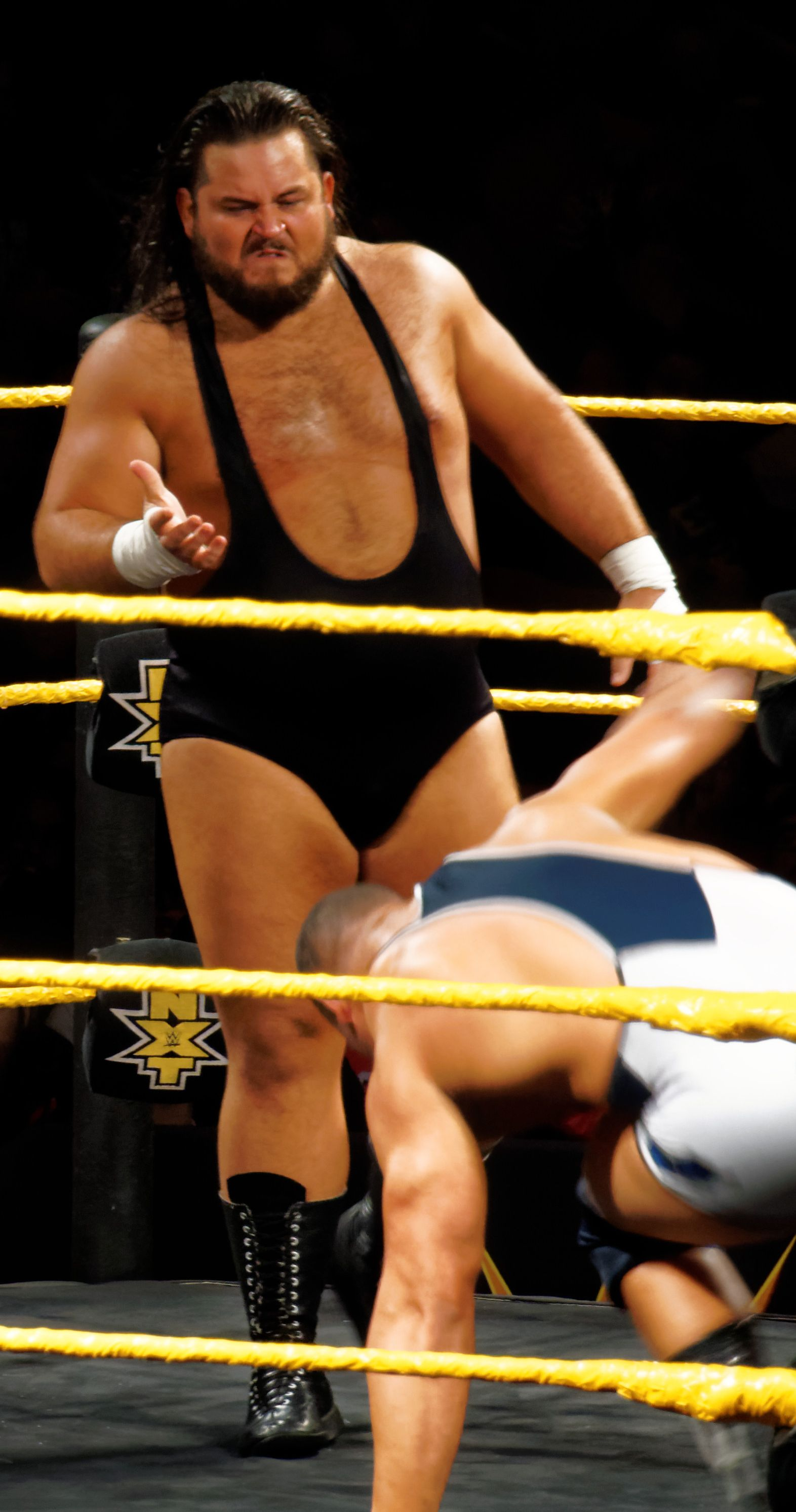
- Dempsey in 2015

Personal information
- Born: January 16, 1988 (age 38) Greenpoint, Brooklyn, New York, U.S.

Professional wrestling career
- Ring name(s): Baby Hughie; Bull Dempsey; Bull James; Donnie Johnson; Hugh Smith; Masked Superstar; Smith James
- Billed height: 6 ft 1 in (1.85 m)
- Billed weight: 320 lb (150 kg)
- Billed from: Brooklyn, New York
- Trained by: Matt Borne; Tazz; WWE Performance Center
- Debut: October 28, 2005

James Smith (born January 16, 1988) is an American professional wrestler. currently performing on the independent circuit under the ring name Bull James. He is best known for his time in WWE, where he performed on NXT, under the ring name Bull Dempsey.

== Professional wrestling career ==
=== Early career (2005–2013) ===
Smith made his debut on October 28, 2005, at East Coast Professional Wrestling event under the ring name Donnie "The Body" Johnson, where he lost to Ace Wylde. Over the next five months, Smith wrestled in National Wrestling Alliance as Baby Hughie. On September 26, 2009, at NWA New Jersey The Dennis Coralluzzo Invitational 2009, The Powers of Pain (The Barbarian and The Warlord) defeated The Varsity Club (Baby Hughie and Rob Eckos). In 2010, Smith changed his ring name to Smith James. On July 21, 2011, James defeated Memphis Mofo in a TNA dark match.

In 2012, James joined The New Age Wrecking Crew with Bill Carr, Stockade and Vince Steele. On March 10, 2012, Steele and James entered in a tournament to crown a new ACE Tag team Champions, but were defeated in the finals by The Movement. On March 9, 2013, James and Vince Steele won the American Championship Entertainment (ACE) Tag Team Championship. They lost the titles on May 11, 2013. On February 23, 2013, James and Bill Carr won the NYWC Tag Team Championship. However, they lost the title against Mikey Whipwreck and Stockade on June 23, 2013, his last match in the company.

=== WWE (2013–2016) ===
In June 2013, James signed a contract with WWE. He was assigned to the WWE Performance Center. On August 28, 2013, his name was changed to Bull Dempsey. Dempsey made his debut in NXT on September 12, 2013, where he was defeated by Aiden English. Throughout late 2013, he made sporadic appearances as an enhancement talent. In the late spring to summer, Dempsey returned to NXT as a tweener, squashing various low carders and local talents. In August, Dempsey and Mojo Rawley formed an uneasy tag team and participated in the NXT Tag Team Championship tournament, where they were defeated by The Vaudevillains (Aiden English and Simon Gotch) in the first round, prompting Dempsey to attack Rawley in the aftermath and establishing himself a heel. On September 11 at the NXT TakeOver: Fatal 4-Way event, Dempsey defeated Rawley in a squash with his new finisher The Diving Headbutt. On the September 25 episode of NXT, Bull was victorious in the rematch. Following that, he embarked on a rivalry with Baron Corbin, another dominant wrestler who mostly squashed jobbers. The two competed to see how quickly they could defeat the "local talent", sometimes back-to-back. This eventually led to a match between the two on January 14, 2015, in which Dempsey's undefeated streak was broken by Corbin.

Dempsey competed in the Andre the Giant Memorial Battle Qualification Tournament at WrestleMania Axxess 31, but lost to Tyler Breeze in the first round. Soon after this, Dempsey's gimmick was tweaked to that of an overweight, out of shape wrestler who eats too much, which also saw him turn face in the process. After several vignettes aired to promote "Bull-Fit", Dempsey debuted his new gimmick on the August 26 episode of NXT, where he defeated Elias Samson. On the February 24 episode of NXT, he was defeated by Tommaso Ciampa. On the March 23 episode of NXT, he and his supposed opponent Danny Burch both got beaten down by Samoa Joe, before they even started the match, this led to a match between Dempsey and Joe on the following weeks episode. Dempsey won in a quick squash match by disqualification because Joe kept his finisher, the Coquina Clutch, on Dempsey prompting NXT General Manager William Regal to try to stop him. Samoa Joe's insubordination would bring NXT Champion Finn Bálor to the ring to "rescue" Dempsey. The following week Dempsey lost to Joe in a squash match, this was Dempsey's final appearance for NXT.

On February 5, 2016, Dempsey announced on the social network Twitter that he had been released from WWE.

=== Independent circuit (2016–present) ===
James began wrestling on the independent circuit following his release from NXT, using the name Bull James, a combination of his NXT name and his birth name. James announced that he was set to debut in Combat Zone Wrestling, stating that he was coming after Sami Callihan, also known as Solomon Crowe, facing him on March 1. On February 25, 2017, James won the NYWC Heavyweight Championship at Psycho Circus XV. On February 24, 2018, James lost the title to Alex Reynolds at Psycho Circus XVI only to regain it on March 31, 2018, at Aftermath. James lost the title to King Mega on June 30, 2018, at Going The Distance. On March 11, 2017, James won the SWF Cruiserweight Title at SWF Legacies Never Die.

In 2017, James founded Outlaw Pro Wrestling, an independent professional wrestling promotion that has held events in Williamsburg, Brooklyn.

On January 5, 2024, James made his debut at a Florida-based Independent wrestling promotion, Boca Raton Championship Wrestling (BRCW) defeating Ozzy Kilmeister and Skitz in a Three-way. On March 17, He defeated Jaden Jakens in BRCW march madhouse.

=== Ring of Honor (2016) ===
On September 18, 2016, James made a surprise debut in Ring of Honor's Honor Rumble, making it to the final four. On October 21, 2016, James faced ROH World Champion Adam Cole, in a losing effort. The following day James teamed up with Mr. Wrestling III losing to B. J. Whitmer and Punisher Martinez. James was defeated by Silas Young.

== Championships and accomplishments ==
- American Championship Entertainment
  - ACE Tag Team Championship (1 time) – with Vince Steele
- Atomic Revolutionary Wrestling
  - ARW Next Level Championship (1 time)
- Independent Superstars of Professional Wrestling
  - ISPW Heavyweight Championship (3 times)
  - ISPW Tri-State Championship (1 time)
- Independent Wrestling Federation
  - IWF American Heavyweight Championship (1 time)
- New York Wrestling Connection
  - NYWC Heavyweight Championship (2 time)
  - NYWC Fusion Championship (1 time)
  - NYWC Tag Team Championship (1 time) – with Bill Carr
- East Coast Professional Wrestling
  - ECPW Showcase Heavyweight Championship (1 time)
- Pro Wrestling Illustrated
  - Ranked No. 187 of the top 500 singles wrestlers in the PWI 500 in 2014
- Superstars of Wrestling Federation
  - SWF Cruiserweight Championship (1 time)
