= Outlaw Pro Wrestling =

American professional wrestling promotion

Outlaw Wrestling
- Outlaw Pro Wrestling event in 2024
- Industry: Professional wrestling
- Founded: 2017
- Founder: Bull James
- Area served: New York City

Outlaw Wrestling is an American professional wrestling promotion based in New York City. Founded in 2017 by professional wrestler Bull James, it has held events in Williamsburg, Brooklyn.

== History ==
Bull James founded Outlaw Wrestling in 2017. The promotion has staged events at Our Lady of Mount Carmel in Williamsburg, Brooklyn.

On March 20, 2025, the promotion held End of an Era at Arlo Williamsburg. The event featured Homicide's retirement match, in which he teamed with Bull James to defeat Mike Santana and Afa Jr.. Following the match, Homicide was announced as the first inductee into the Outlaw Wrestling Hall of Fame.

In May 2025, a scheduled event at Arlo Williamsburg was relocated to the Brooklyn Monarch and rescheduled for May 21.

On January 30, 2026, Eddie Kingston and Ortiz defeated the Audacity, consisting of Micah Cortez and Seth Cortez, to win the promotion's tag team championship in Brooklyn.

== Championships ==
The promotion has featured a singles championship, the Outlaw Wrestling Championship, and a tag team championship.

Manbun Jesus at Outlaw Pro Wrestling
