= Jaka (wrestler) =

American professional wrestler (1986–2025)

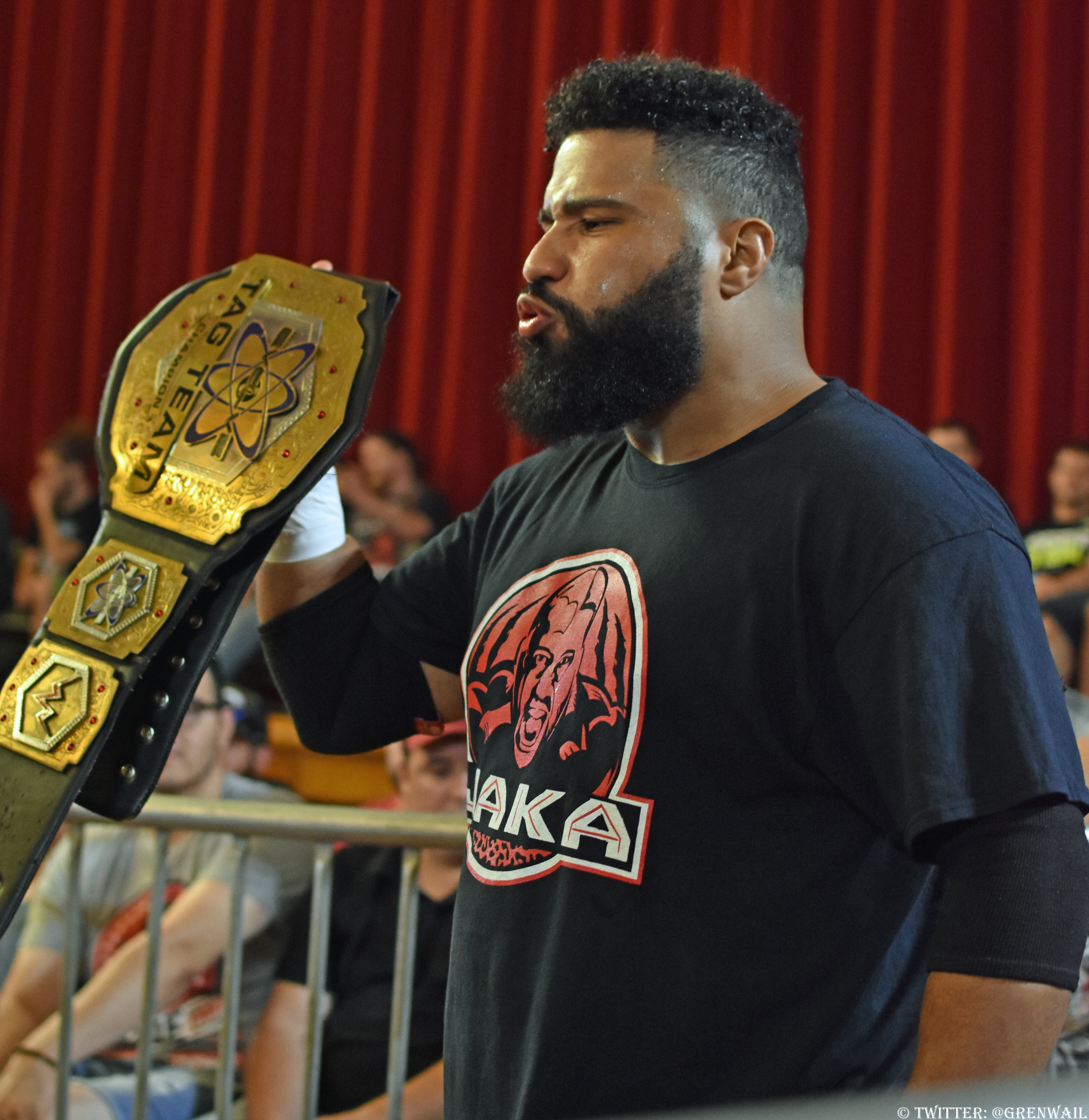
- Jaka in August 2018

Personal information
- Born: Jonathan Echevarria; February 12, 1986 Staten Island, New York, U.S.
- Died: September 7, 2025 (aged 39) Boca Raton, Florida U.S.

Professional wrestling career
- Ring name(s): Jaka; Jonny Mangue
- Billed height: 5 ft 8 in (178 cm)
- Billed weight: 235 lb (107 kg)
- Trained by: Harley Race; Magic
- Debut: August 2007

Jonathan Echevarria (February 12, 1986 – September 7, 2025), better known by his ring name Jaka, was an American professional wrestler. He was best known for his work in Beyond Wrestling, Game Changer Wrestling, Evolve and BRCW. He also made appearances for WWE, All Elite Wrestling (AEW), and the National Wrestling Alliance (NWA).

== Professional wrestling career ==
=== Game Changer Wrestling (2015–2016) ===
In March 2015, Jaka made his Game Changer Wrestling debut at the time it was then called Jersey Championship Wrestling. He made his last GCW appearance on March 12, 2016, at To Crown A Champion, defeating Matt Macintosh.

=== Evolve (2016–2018) ===
Jaka made his Evolve debut on November 12, 2016, at Evolve 72, where he teamed up with Chris Dickinson and they defeated Darby Allin and Tony Nese. On April 22, 2017, at Evolve 82, they defeated their Catch Point stablemates Fred Yehi and Tracy Williams to win the Evolve Tag Team Championship. Dickinson and Jaka would win the titles again at September 23, at Evolve 93. They held the titles until October 28, 2018, when they lost them to the Street Profits at Evolve 114.

=== WWE (2018) ===
As part of WWE and Evolve Wrestling's partnership, Dickinson and Jaka made their WWE debut at WrestleMania 34 Axxess where they successfully defended their Evolve tag team championships against Oney Lorcan and Danny Burch.

=== BRCW (2022–2025) ===
In September 2022, Jaka defeated The Wingmen (Cezar Bononi and JD Drake) in a 4-way ladder match with Sean Maluta and won the tag team championship title. Later in July 2023, he appeared on NWA/BRCW Boca Versus The World. Jaka made his last BRCW appearance on August 31,2025.

== Death ==
On August 31, 2025, Jaka suffered a heart attack and was placed in the ICU. He died a week later, on September 7, at the age of 39.

== Championships and accomplishments ==
- Boca Raton Championship Wrestling
  - BRCW Tag Team Championship (1 time) – with Sean Maluta
- Evolve Wrestling
  - Evolve Tag Team Championship (2 times) – with Chris Dickinson
- Full Impact Pro
  - FIP World Tag Team Championship (1 time) – with Sean Maluta
- Wrestling Is Fun!
  - WIF! Banana Championship (1 time)
