= Kona Reeves =

American professional wrestler (born 1991)

- Kona Reeves in January 2025

Personal information
- Born: Noah Gregory Kekoa Haaheo Pang-Potjes; June 5, 1991 (age 35) Orlando, Florida, U.S.

Professional wrestling career
- Ring name(s): Kona Reeves; Noah Kekoa; Noah Potjes; Juan Carlos Reneo
- Billed height: 6 ft 4 in (1.93 m)
- Billed weight: 250 lb (110 kg)
- Billed from: Honolulu, Hawaii
- Trained by: Afa Anoa'i; Don Muraco
- Debut: 2013

Noah Gregory Kekoa Haaheo Pang-Potjes (born June 5, 1991), better known by his ring name Kona Reeves, is an American professional wrestler. He currently performs on the independent circuit, predominantly for Boca Raton Championship Wrestling (BRCW), under the ring name Noah Kekoa. He is best known for his time in WWE, where he performed on their NXT brand.

== Professional wrestling career ==
=== Independent circuit (2013–2014, 2021–present) ===
Pang-Potjes was trained to be a professional wrestler by Afa Anoa'i at the Wild Samoan Pro Wrestling Training Center. He wrestled for World Xtreme Wrestling under the ring name Noah Kekoa, where he held the WXW Heavyweight Championship.

=== WWE (2014–2021) ===
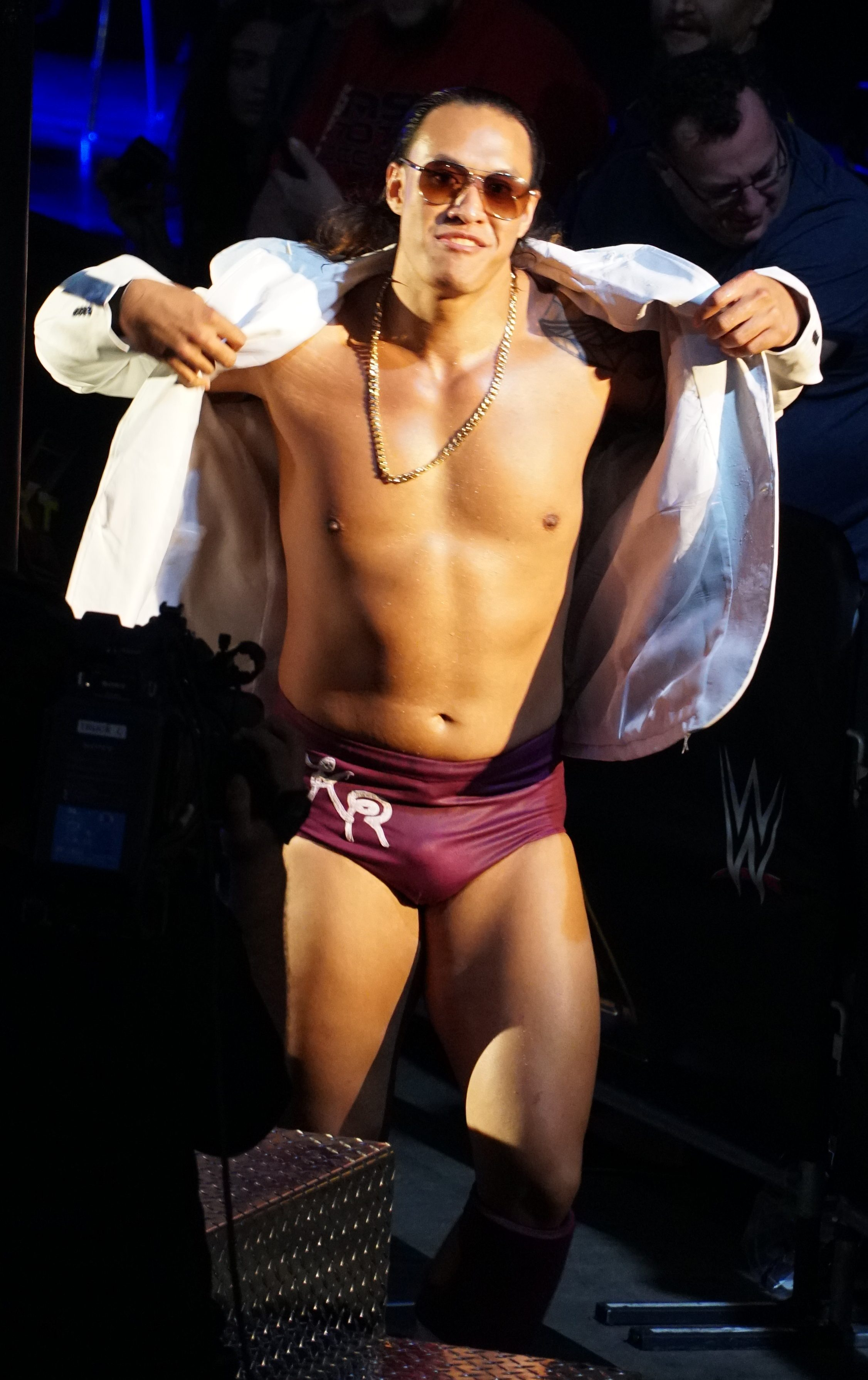
Reeves at WrestleMania Axxess in April 2018

In May 2014, it was announced that Pang-Potjes had signed with WWE. He began working at NXT live events from April 2015 and made his first major appearance in September 2015 as part of the inaugural Dusty Rhodes Tag Team Classic, teaming with Alexander Wolfe as a last minute replacement for Marcus Louis in a first-round defeat to The Hype Bros. Working under his real name, Potjes had his first televised singles match on the May 4, 2016 episode of NXT, losing to No Way Jose. Potjes made several further televised appearances, losing to Tye Dillinger and Andrade "Cien" Almas. In November 2016, Potjes adopted the new ring name Kona Reeves. On the November 23 episode of NXT, a match between Reeves and Rich Swann was interrupted by SAnitY, who attacked both men. Reeves then made several further televised appearances throughout the early part of 2017, losing to Aleister Black and Hideo Itami.

After a long absence from television, a vignette aired on the April 18, 2018 episode of NXT promoting Reeves' return as "The Finest" Kona Reeves. He would make his return two weeks later defeating Patrick Scott, establishing himself as a heel. Reeves would then continue making sporadic appearances on NXT over the next couple of years. On August 6, 2021, Reeves was released from his WWE contract.

== Personal life ==
Pang-Potjes is of Native Hawaiian, Chinese, Dutch, Indonesian, Filipino and Spanish descent. He now works as a German Mechanic at Indiana Jones Epic Stunt Spectacular in Disney’s Hollywood Studios.

== Championships and accomplishments ==
- Boca Raton Championship Wrestling
  - BRCW Heavyweight Championship (1 time)
  - BRCW Tag Team Championship (1 time, current) – with Cezar Bononi
- Pro Wrestling Illustrated
  - Ranked No. 324 of the 500 best singles wrestlers in the PWI 500 in 2018
- World Xtreme Wrestling
  - WXW Heavyweight Championship (1 time)
