= Boca Raton Championship Wrestling =

American independent professional wrestling promotion

- Acronym: BRCW
- Founded: 2022
- Style: professional wrestling
- Headquarters: Boca Raton
- Founder(s): Matthew Maschler; Neil Glazier
- Owner(s): Matthew Maschler and Neil Glazier (2022-present)
- Sister: Coastal Championship Wrestling
- Website: bocaratonwrestling.com

Boca Raton Championship Wrestling or simply known as BRCW is an American independent professional wrestling promotion based in Boca Raton, Florida. The promotion was founded in May 2022 by Matthew Maschler and Neil Glazier. On May 15, first live show of BRCW was held. It then aired two days later on YouTube. Since then, new BRCW events have aired on YouTube. The name of promotion is derived from the geographic location it was founded in. BRCW is the sister promotion to Coastal Championship Wrestling, beginning as a special one off CCW event, and shares its logo styles.

== History ==
In May 2022, formation of Boca Raton Championship Wrestling was announced by Neil Glazier (NeilTheHeel) and Matthew Maschler, also the hosts of the MatthewMania Podcast. In early 2022, BRCW announced that they had entered into a strategic partnership with fellow independent wrestling promotion Coastal Championship Wrestling.

The promotion sticks to a quarterly event format. Since 2022, WWE Hall of Famer Brutus "The Barber" Beefcake has served as the commissioner of BRCW

On May 15, 2022, BRCW held their first event from The Boca Black Box, which aired later on YouTube. The event was hosted by NXT Creative Producer Ryan Katz, along with Matthew Maschler. At the event, Lakay defeated Alan "s2s" Martinez, Ariel Levy, Jack Talos, Kerry Morton and TC Read in a six-way ladder match in BRCW Heavyweight Championship tournament finals to become the inaugural champion.

On November 6, 2022, at BRCW November Knockdown from The Loft At Congress, MJ Jenkins defeated Kiah Dream and KiLynn King to become the inaugural Women's Champion.

On March 12, 2023, at BRCW March Madhouse, Mark Long was crowned the BRCW All-Star Champion and was then immediately challenged by former WWE Superstar Matt Cardona for the following show. On May 7, Mark Long defeated Matt Cardona (w/ Steph De Lander) to retain the BRCW All-Star Championship.

In July, Boca Raton Championship Wrestling partnered with the National Wrestling Alliance for a joint show titled NWA/BRCW Boca vs The World. At the event, held July 19th from The Boca Black Box, cross promotion matches were held with multiple championships from both companies being defended. In the main event, Bull James and Gangrel defeated Daisy Kill and Jack Talos. Elsewhere on the card, Thom Latimer (c) defeated Noah Kekoa to retain the NWA World Heavyweight Championship and Kerry Morton (c) retained his NWA World Junior Heavyweight Championship against Alan "s2s' Martinez. BRCW Heavyweight Champion Lakay (c) defeated Jamie Stanley in the opening contest of the show.

On November 5, 2023, The Island Kings (Jaka & Sean Maluta) defeated The Bollywood Boyz, The Righteous (Dutch & Vincent) and Daisy Kill & Jack Talos in a four-way ladder match to become the first BRCW Tag Team Champions.

On November 1, 2024, BRCW announced that QT Marshall will be facing Maxwell Jacob Friedman (MJF) at Festival of Fights. in MJF's first independent appearance after a year. On December 15, MJF faced off with QT Marshall in the main event with an appearance of Big Boom AJ. MJF eventually defeated QT Marshall in the match following the interference.

At Cruisin For A Bruisin 2 in January of 2024, Matt Riddle debuted in Boca Raton Championship Wrestling to help his former tag partner, Stallion Rogers secure the number one contendership. Stallion earned the right to challenge Madman Fulton at the following show.

Following the sudden passing of Sons Of Boca member, Jaka in September of 2025, his friends and stablemates Noah Kekoa and Cezar Bononi won the BRCW Tag Titles in his memory by defeating Matt Riddle and Stallion Rogers at the following event BRCW November Knockdown after Rogers walks out on Riddle. The event was held on November 2nd from the VIP Ballroom in Boca Raton, Florida.

On January 17, 2026, YEOW!: A Tribute to Jaka, talent from multiple promotions across the world that had a connection to Jaka came together to provide a night of entertainment in honor and dedication to their lost friend. Talent that appeared included Eddie Kingston, Ortiz, Leon Ruff, Chocolate Stud, Suge D, TJ Marconi, "Bad Boy" Joey Janela, Drew Gulak, Gentlemen Jervis, and more. The tribute was held in Jaka's adopted hometown of Orlando at Sun On The Beach and was hosted by his widow. Proceeds for the event went towards opening a wrestling school in Jaka's name to help train the next generation of professional wrestlers and provide a scholarship for training.

In August 2026, BRCW announced that Steve Maclin had been suspended indefinitely from the promotion and the BRCW heavyweight title was vacated. As a replacement to the already announced title match between Maclin and Matt Riddle, BRCW CEO, Matthew Maschler announced a fatal four way title match for the vacant BRCW Heavyweight Championship between Riddle, Stallion Rogers, Madman Fulton, and "Sexual" Matt Taven at BRCW Summer Smash. On August 16, Matt Riddle defeated Rogers, Taven, and Fulton to win his first BRCW Heavyweight Championship.

On November 6, A.J Francis defeated Matt Riddle (c) for the championship at Cruisin For A Bruisin 4. Also on the card, Chris Farrow (c) retained his BRCW Cha Cha Championship over Cha Cha Charlie.

=== MatthewMania podcast ===
MatthewMania is a video podcast which discusses professional wrestling events and WWE front-row experiences. Founded by Matthew Maschler, the podcast is independent but syndicated to professional wrestling. The podcast was founded in 2022 with a panel of two hosts, Matthew Maschler and Neil Glazier. Bill Alfonso, Madman Fulton, M.J. Jenkins, Noah Kekoa and other wrestling stars have been hosted on the podcast.

== Programming and events ==
=== List of events ===
==== 2022 ====
Name	Date (taped)	Venue	City	Main event	Ref
BRCW At The Boca Black Box	May 15, 2022	Boca Black Box	Boca Raton, Florida	Lakay vs Alan Martinez, Ariel Levy, Jack Talos (w/Frank The Clown), Kerry Morton and TC Read for the inaugural BRCW Heavyweight Championship	
Summer Smash	September 4, 2022	Peter Blum Family YMCA	Boca Raton, Florida	Lakay (c) vs Gangrel for the BRCW Heavyweight Championship	
November Knockdown	November 6, 2022	The Loft At Congress	Boca Raton, Florida	The Mortons (Kerry Morton and Ricky Morton) vs Alan Martinez and Ariel Levy	

==== 2023 ====
Name	Date	Venue	City	Main event	Ref
Cruisin' For A Bruisin'	January 31, 2023 (Taped)	VIP Ballroom At CBI	Boca Raton, Florida	Lakay (c) vs Jack Talos for the BRCW Heavyweight Championship	
March Madhouse	March 12, 2023 (Taped)	The Studio	Boca Raton, Florida	Jack Talos (c) (w/ Frank The Clown) vs Cha Cha Charlie	
Challenge Accepted	May 7, 2023 (Taped)	The Studio	Boca Raton, Florida	Mark Long (c) vs Matt Cardona (w/ Steph De Lander) for the BRCW All-Star Championship	
NWA/BRCW Boca Versus The World	July 19, 2023	Boca Black Box	Boca Raton, Florida	Bull James and Gangrel defeat Daisy Kill and Talos	
Birthday Bash	November 5, 2023 (Taped)	The Studio	Boca Raton, Florida	Lakay (c) vs Madman Fulton for the BRCW Heavyweight Championship	

==== 2024 ====
Name	Date	Venue	City	Main event	Ref
Cruisin' For A Bruisin' II	January 25, 2024	Pullman Hotel	Miami, Florida	Madman Fulton (c) vs Kerry Morton for the BRCW Heavyweight Championship	
March Madhouse	March 17, 2024 (Taped)	VIP Ballroom	Boca Raton, Florida	Madman Fulton (c) vs Stallion Rogers for the BRCW Heavyweight Championship	
School's Out	May 19, 2024 (Taped)	The Studio	Boca Raton, Florida	Madman Fulton (c) vs Noah Kekoa vs Big Boy Patty, vs Danny Briggs vs Bobby Fish in a gauntlet match for the BRCW Heavyweight Championship	
Summer Smash 2	September 1, 2024	The Studio	Boca Raton, Florida	Lakay and Moose (c) vs The Wild Stallions (Matt Riddle and Stallion Rogers) for the BRCW Tag Team Championships	
Renaissance	October 20, 2024	The Studio	Boca Raton, Florida	The Wild Stallions (Matt Riddle and Stallion Rogers) (c) vs Alan Martinez and Ariel Levy for BRCW Tag Team Championship	
Festival of Fights	December 15, 2024	VIP Ballroom	Boca Raton, Florida	Maxwell Jacob Friedman vs QT Marshall	

==== 2025 ====
Name	Date	Venue	City	Main event	Ref
Cruisin' For A Bruisin' 3	January 30, 2025	Pullman Hotel	Miami, Florida	High Seas Rumble: "Kid Chocolate" Mo Jabari, Alan Martinez, Cha Cha Charlie, Elliot Qrow (w/ Mickey Ray Santra), Jaka, Big Boy Patty, Rhys Maddox, "Dynamite Kid" Tommy Billington, Sean Maluta, Luigi Primo, "Big Guns" Justin Andrews, Skitz, Lakay, Ozzy Kilmeister, Ariel Levy, Nic Nemeth	
Challenge Accepted 2	March 09, 2025	The Studio	Boca Raton, Florida	Noah Kekoa (c) vs Ricky Morton (w/ Kerry Morton) for the BRCW Heavyweight Championship	
BRCW Underground	May 18, 2025	The Studio	Boca Raton, Florida	Steve Maclin vs Lakay vs Madman Fulton vs Noah Kekoa for the #1 Contendership to the BRCW Heavyweight Championship	
BRCW Summer Smash 3	August 31, 2025	The Studio	Boca Raton, Florida	Ricky Morton (c) (w/ Kerry Morton) vs Steve Maclin for the BRCW Heavyweight Championship	
BRCW November Knockdown	November 02, 2025	VIP Ballroom At CBI	Boca Raton, Florida	The Wild Stallions (Matt Riddle and Stallion Rogers) (c) vs the Sons Of Boca (Noah Kekoa and Cezar Bononi) (w/ Neil The Heel & Sean Maluta) for the BRCW Tag Team Championships	
BRCW Over The Edge	December 05, 2025	Melia Orlando Celebration Poolside	Celebration, Florida	Mark Long vs Madman Fulton (w/ Keanu Soto)	

==== 2026 ====
Name	Date	Venue	City	Main event	Ref
BRCW/CCW Yeow!: A Tribute To Jaka	January 17, 2026	Sun On The Beach	Kissimmee, Florida	Catch Point (Chris Dickinson, Drew Gulak & Matt Riddle) vs Jon Davis & The WorkHorsemen (Anthony Henry & JD Drake) (w/ Amber Young)	
BRCW Birthday Bash 2	March 01, 2026	VIP Ballroom	Boca Raton, Florida	Steve Maclin (c) vs "Sexual" Matt Taven for the BRCW Heavyweight Championship	
BRCW Vegas Vacation	April 15, 2026	FSW Arena	Las Vegas, Nevada, USA	Joe Coffey vs Matt Riddle	
BRCW Summer Smash	August 16, 2026	The Studio	Boca Raton, Florida	Matt Riddle vs Madman Fulton vs Matt Taven vs Stallion Rogers for the Vacant BRCW Heavyweight Championship	
BRCW Cruisin For A Bruisin 4	November 6th, 2026 (Taped)	Miami Airport Convention Center	Miami, Florida	Matt Riddle (c) vs A.J Francis for the BRCW Heavyweight Championship	

=== Current ===
==== Summer Smash ====
Summer Smash is a web television program that airs on BRCW's YouTube. The first show of series debuted on September 4, 2022.

==== November Knock Down ====
November Knock Down is a professional wrestling event held in Boca Raton, Florida, at The Loft At Congress on November 6, 2022. It was BRCW's one of the first major events and the first event under the November Knock Down chronology, where the main event featured Jack Talos defeating Cezar Bononi, Cha Cha Charlie and Stallion Rogers in a final for the BRCW Heavyweight Title. Commentary was provided by Matthew Rehwoldt and Brad Williams. This show later aired on BRCW's YouTube.

==== Cruisin' For A Bruisin' ====
Cruisin' For A Bruisin' is a professional wrestling event that took place in Boca Raton, Florida, at VIP Ballroom At CBI on January 31, 2023. Commentary was provided by Matthew Rehwoldt and Shaul Guerrero. This show did not air on BRCW YouTube.

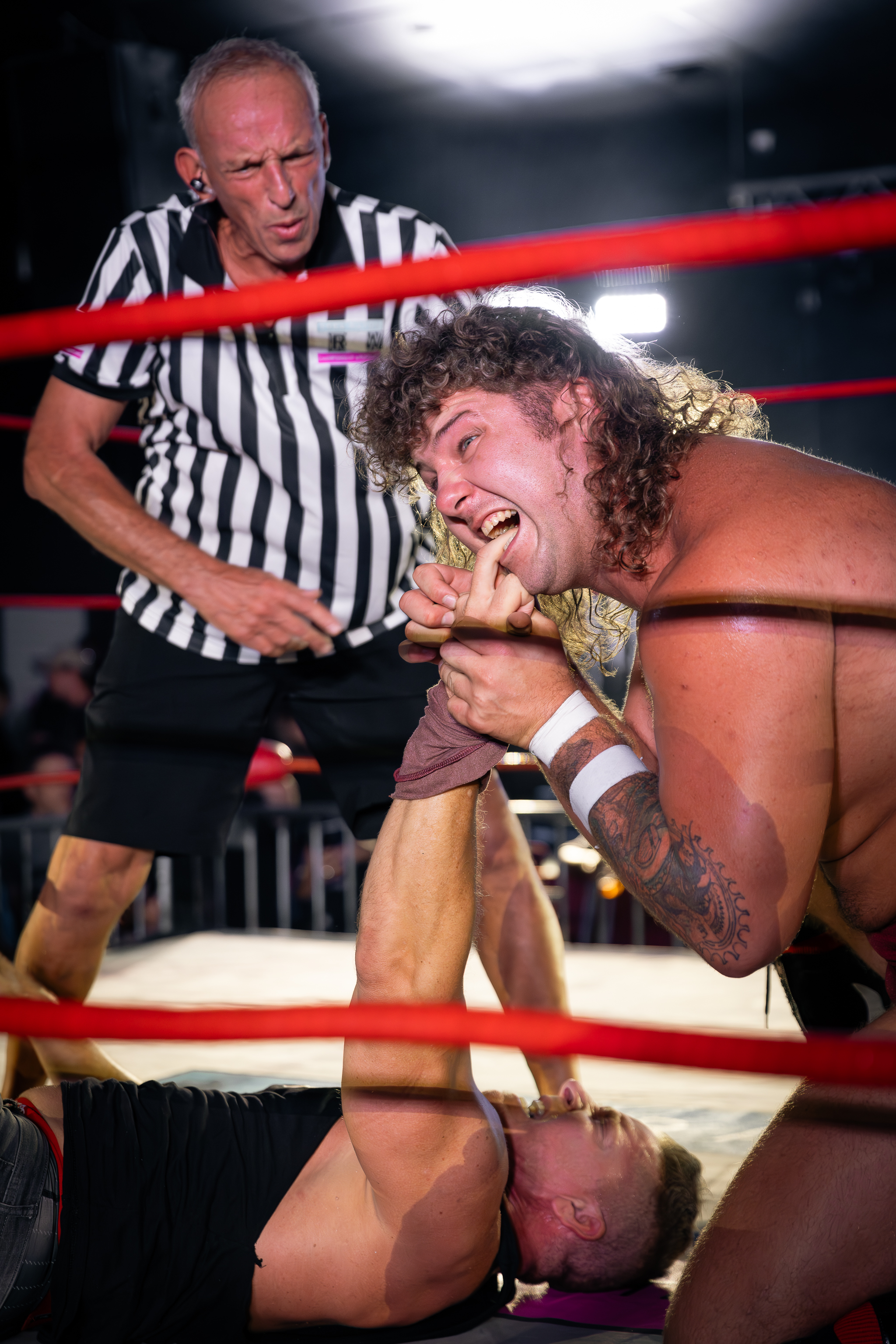
Silas Mason fights Mark Long during NWA/BRCW Boca versus The World

=== Major events ===
Boca Raton Championship Wrestling has produced 25 chronological events. The first event took place on May 15, 2022, in Boca Raton, Florida at the Boca Black Box. The Studio at Mizner Park has held the most events. BRCW made its Vegas debut during the WrestleMania 42 with BRCW Vegas Vacation.

== Championships ==
=== Current champions ===
As of August 2026

Championship	Current champion(s)	Date won	Days held	Location	Note	Ref.
BRCW Heavyweight Championship	AJ Francis	November 6, 2026	7+	Boca Raton, Florida	Defeated Matt Riddle	
BRCW Women's Championship	Lacey Lane	August 16, 2026	89+	Boca Raton, Florida	Defeated Shayna Bazsler	
BRCW Tag Team Championship	Sons of Boca (Cezar Bononi and Noah Kekoa)	November 2, 2025	376+	Boca Raton, Florida	Defeated The Wild Stallions (Matt Riddle and Stallion Rogers)	
BRCW Cruiserweight Championship	Jonny Fairplay	March 9, 2025	614+	Boca Raton, Florida	Defeated Neil The Heel and the Island Kings in a Handicap Match	
BRCW 6-man tag team championship	Gangrel and The Righteous	August 16, 2026	89+	Boca Raton, Florida	Defeated The Kings Court; Inaugural Champions	
BRCW All-Star Championship	Mark Long	March 12, 2023	1342+	Boca Raton, Florida	Inaugural Champion	
BRCW Cha Cha Title	Chris Farrow	August 16, 2026	89+	Boca Raton, Florida	Defeated Cha Cha Charlie, Steve Person, Sean Maluta, and Sam Shaw	

== Roster ==
=== Male wrestlers ===
- Cezar Bononi
- Madman Fulton
- Bulletproof Troop
- Alan "S2S" Martinez
- Skitz
- Matt Taven
- Moose
- Noah Kekoa
- Ricky Morton
- Steve Maclin
- Maxwell Jacob Friedman
- Vincent
- Jaka
- Sean Maluta
- Cha Cha Charlie
- Cheeseburger
- Deztro The Eskimofo
- Matthew Rehwoldt
- Lakay
- Ariel Levy
- EJ Nduka
- Brutus Beefcake
- Gangrel
- Jack Talos
- Tyler Breeze
- Neil The Heel
- Big Guns Justin Andrews
- The Island Kings
- Josh Woods
- Kerry Morton
- BRCW Hero Jayden
- Matthew Maschler
- Danny Briggs
- Gurv Sihra and Harv Sihra (The Bollywood Boyz)
- Bull James
- Hacksaw Jim Duggan
- Luigi Primo
- Mark Long
- Vinicious
- Ozzy Kilmeister
- Derrick Kosinski
- Bobby Fish
- Jake "The Snake" Roberts
- Dutch
- Daisy Kill
- Kenny King
- Frankie Kazarian
- Rich Swann
- Scott Yager
- QT Marshall
- NolerBear
- Matt Riddle
- Curt Stallion
- Lloyd Anoa'i
- Levis Valenzuela
- Scotty 2 Hotty
- Dirty Dango
- Matt Cardona
- Ricardo Rodriguez

=== Female wrestlers ===
- M. J. Jenkins
- Renee Michelle
- Santana Garrett
- Shaul Guerrero
- Ruthie Jay
- Kiah Dream
- KiLynn King
- Mila Moore
- Red Velvet
- Deonna Purrazzo
- Steph De Lander
- Harley Cameron
- Leva Bates
- Val Capone
- Ash by Elegance
- Lacey Lane
- Shayna Baszler

=== Entertainers ===
- Charlie Parra
- Brad Williams
- Westside Gunn

=== Broadcast team ===
- Charlie Parra
- Matthew Rehwoldt
- Ricardo Rodriguez
- Val Capone
- Samira
- Shaul Guerrero
- Frank The Clown
- Ilan

== Reception ==
BRCW has garnered widespread acclaim for its in-ring performance, production, and fanbase. Prominent personalities like Maxwell Jacob Friedman, Mark Long, Jack Talos, Noah Kekoa, Ryan Katz and American rapper Westside Gunn have openly praised the promotion.
