= Francisco Ciatso =

American professional wrestler (1975–2024)

Personal information
- Born: Frank Caiazzo; May 11, 1975 Oyster Bay, New York, U.S.
- Died: January 20, 2024 (aged 48)

Professional wrestling career
- Ring name(s): Francisco Ciatso; Frankie Ciatso; Mike Ciatso; King Ciatso; Frankie Capone; Francisco Capone; Frankie Coverdale
- Billed height: 5 ft 10 in (178 cm)
- Billed weight: 222 lb (101 kg)
- Trained by: Adrian Street; WCW Power Plant
- Debut: 1996

Frank Caiazzo (May 11, 1975 – January 20, 2024), better known by his ring name Francisco Ciatso, was an American professional wrestler, known for his time with the National Wrestling Alliance, Deep South Wrestling, and brief appearances with the WWE and TNA.

== Life and career ==
Ciatso began his career on the independent circuit in 1996. On May 25, 2001, he made his NWA Florida debut, losing to Chris Layton. In the fall of 2005, he started working for Deep South Wrestling, a WWE developmental territory. On March 6, 2006, he made his WWE debut, losing to Matt Striker on WWE Heat. He also wrestled Tatanka on March 7, 2006, on WWE Velocity.

In 2019, a documentary titled Journeyman was released, documenting his career.

Ciatso died on January 20, 2024, at the age of 48.

== Championships and accomplishments ==
- American Combat Wrestling
  - ACW Tag Team Championship (1 time) – with Gus De La Vega
- Allied Independent Wrestling Federations
  - AIWF America's Heavyweight Championship (1 time)
  - AIWF World Heavyweight Championship (1 time)
  - AIWF World Tag Team Championship (1 time) – with Eric Wayne
- AWA World-1 South
  - AWA World-1 Southern Championship (1 time)
  - AWA Southern Heavyweight Championship (1 time)
  - AWA Alliance Championship (1 time)
- Coastal Championship Wrestling
  - CCW Florida Heavyweight Championship (1 time)
  - CCW Light Heavyweight Championship (1 times)
  - CCW Southern Tag Team Championship (1 time) – with Wet Willie
- Extreme World Wrestling
  - EWW World Heavyweight Championship (1 time)
- Great American Wrestling Federation
  - GAWF Heavyweight Championship (1 time)
- Global Championship Wrestling
  - GCW Heavyweight Championship (2 times)
- IPW Hardcore Wrestling
  - IPW Television Championship (1 time)
  - IPW Light Heavyweight Championship (1 time)
  - IPW Tag Team Championship (1 time) – with Python
- Lariato Pro Wrestling Guild
  - Lariato Pro Tag Team Championship (1 time) – with Storm Thomas
- North American Wrestling Alliance
  - NAWA Tag Team Championship (1 time) – with Logan Creed
- NWA Florida
  - NWA Florida Tag Team Championship (1 time) – with Marcus Dillon
- Pro Wrestling Illustrated
  - PWI ranked him # 498 of the 500 best singles wrestlers of the PWI 500 in 2002
  - PWI ranked him # 468 of the 500 best singles wrestlers of the PWI 500 in 2003
  - PWI ranked him # 407 of the 500 best singles wrestlers of the PWI 500 in 2004
  - PWI ranked him # 392 of the 500 best singles wrestlers of the PWI 500 in 2005
  - PWI ranked him # 435 of the 500 best singles wrestlers of the PWI 500 in 2006
  - PWI ranked him # 286 of the 500 best singles wrestlers of the PWI 500 in 2009
  - PWI ranked him # 435 of the 500 best singles wrestlers of the PWI 500 in 2015
- Pro Wrestling RIOT
  - PWR Tag Team Championship (1 time) – with Shawn Osbourne
- Pro Wrestling Xtreme
  - PWX World Tag Team Championship (1 time) – with Vito LoGrasso
- Southern Championship Wrestling Florida
  - SCW Southern Heavyweight Championship (3 times)
  - SCW Mid Atlantic Heavyweight Championship (1 time)
- USA Pro Wrestling
  - USA Pro Tag Team Championship (1 time) – with AJ Jannazzo
- United States Wrestling Alliance
  - USWA Tag Team Championship (2 times) – with Simon Sez
- Vintage Wrestling
  - Vintage Heavyweight Championship (3 times)
  - King of the State Tournament (2011)
- Old School Championship Wrestling
  - Tag Wars Tournament (2023) – with Bruno El Oso Blanco
- Southern Fried Championship Wrestling
  - SFCW Heavyweight Championship (1 time)
- United Wrestling Association
  - UWA Florida Championship (1 time)
  - UWA Hybrid Championship (1 time)
