= M. J. Jenkins =

American professional wrestler

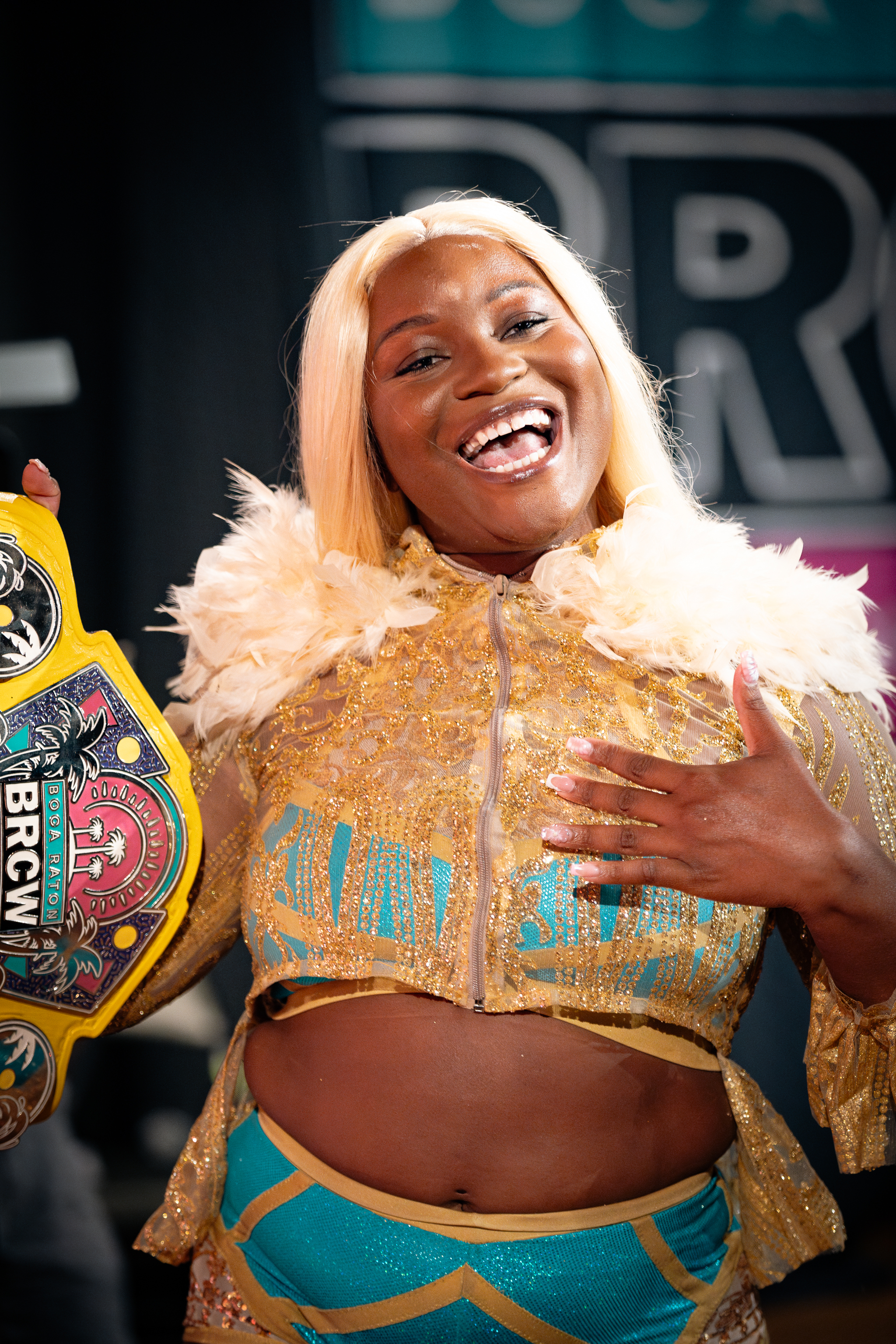
- M.J. Jenkins in 2024

Personal information
- Born: Monique Jacqueline Williams-Jenkins; July 24, 1991 (age 35) Brooklyn, New York, U.S.

Professional wrestling career
- Ring name(s): Monique Jenkins; MJ Jenkins
- Billed height: 5 ft 6 in (168 cm)
- Billed from: Brooklyn, New York
- Trained by: Johnny Rodz; D-Von Dudley
- Debut: October 18, 2015

Monique Jacqueline Williams-Jenkins (born July 24, 1991), known by her ring name M. J. Jenkins, is an American professional wrestler. She currently performs on the independent circuit, primarily for Boca Raton Championship Wrestling. She has also made appearances for All Elite Wrestling (AEW), Impact Wrestling, Major League Wrestling (MLW), National Wrestling Alliance (NWA), Women's Wrestling Revolution and WWE.

== Early life ==
Jenkins was born and raised up in Brooklyn, New York.

== Professional wrestling career ==
=== Independent circuit (2015–present) ===
Jenkins wrestled her first match on October 18, 2015, at EVOLVE 50 against Des DeMonae. After debuting in East Coast Pro Wrestling, she began a feud with rookie wrestler Allie Recks, including a match she lost to Recks by disqualification on November 6, 2015, after striking Recks with a right hand. On November 20, 2015, at ECPW Adrenaline, Jenkins lost to Allie Recks again by disqualification after knocking out Recks once more with a loaded right hand. On November 21, 2015, Jenkins appeared in Legendary Action Wrestling where she defeated Willow Nightingale. On April 10, 2016, Jenkins wrestled for Women's Wrestling Revolution at WWR Project XX in a dark match won by Dominique Fabiano. She wrestled at AIW Girls Night Out 17 on April 30, 2016, in a match won by Solo Darling. On July 13, 2016, at CZW Dojo Wars 83, Jenkins teamed with Allie Recks to challenge the WSU Tag Team Champions held by Eddy McQueen and Rick Cataldo in an unsuccessful title match. On August 6, 2016, at AIW Girls Night Out 18, Jenkins was defeated by Vanity in a singles match. At CZW Dojo Wars 88 on August 17, Jenkins teamed with Rick Cataldo in a tag match won by Joe Keys & Rob Locke.

Jenkins debuted at NWA/BRCW Boca vs The World event of Boca Raton Championship Wrestling and was defeated along with Ruthie Jay by Kenzie Paige and Kylie Paige in a tag team match.

=== Impact Wrestling (2017) ===
Jenkins made her debut in 2017 at TNA One Night Only where she was defeated by Rosemary. At AIW Girls Night Out 19 on March 11, Jenkins defeated Solo Darling in a singles match. It was reported on November 1, 2017, that Jenkins was released by Impact Wrestling.

=== WWE (2018–2020) ===
==== Mae Young Classic (2018) ====
On February 8, 2018, Jenkins took part in an invitation-only tryout at the WWE Performance Center in Orlando, Florida. On July 17, it was announced that Jenkins had signed a contract. She debuted during the August 8 tapings of the 2018 Mae Young Classic, where she was eliminated in the first round by Rhea Ripley. During the August 9 tapings of the Mae Young Classic, Jenkins teamed with Jessie Elaban & Xia Brookside in defeating Allysin Kay, Reina Gonzalez & Vanessa Kraven in a six-woman match.

==== NXT (2018–2020) ====
Jenkins debuted on NXT during August 24 house show where she teamed with Jessie Elaban in a tag match and lost to Bianca Belair and Lacey Evans. She teamed with Jessie Elaban during the September 6 house show, where they defeated Kavita Devi and Reina Gonzalez. During the September 28 house show competed in a No. 1 Contendership Battle Royal for the United Kingdom Women's Championship. She finished her debut year with a match during the December 15 house show defeating Aliyah. Jenkins was released from WWE later in 2020.

== Championships and accomplishments ==
- Boca Raton Championship Wrestling
  - BRCW Women's Championship (1 time, inaugural)
- World of Unpredictable Wrestling
  - World Of Unpredictable Wrestling Stunners Championship (1 time)

== Filmography ==
=== Television ===
Year	Title	Role	Notes
2016	WWR Project XX	Herself	
2016	New Girls in Town	Herself	
2016	BCP Battle by the 6	Herself	
2017	Impact One Night Only	Herself	
2017	Impact Xplosion	Herself	Victory Road – Knockouts Knockdown PPV
2017	WWR Brick House	Herself	
2017	High Heels	Herself	
2017	BCP The Bounty in the King's County	Herself	
2018	WWE: Mae Young Classic Women Tournament	Herself	
2018	WWE SmackDown	Herself	
2020	WWE NXT	Herself	
2020	AEW Dynamite	Herself	
