= Cezar Bononi =

Brazilian professional wrestler

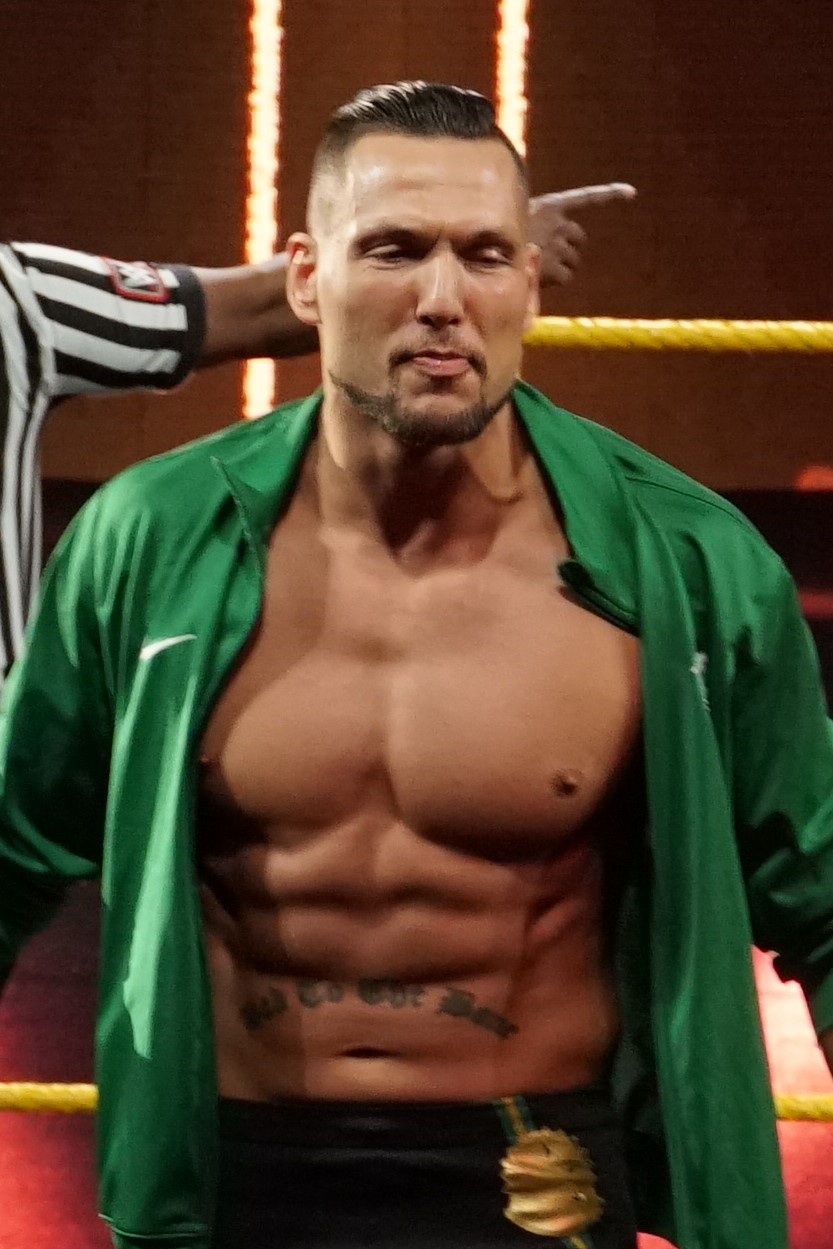
- Bononi in 2018

Personal information
- Born: 15 June 1986 (age 40) São Paulo, Brazil
- Spouse: Camila Bononi (m. 2015)

Professional wrestling career
- Ring name(s): Cezar Bononi; V8 Big Block
- Billed height: 6 ft 6 in (198 cm)
- Billed weight: 270 lb (120 kg)
- Billed from: São Paulo, Brazil; Orlando, Florida
- Trained by: Bob Júnior; WWE Performance Center
- Debut: 2012

Cezar Bononi (born 15 June 1986) is a Brazilian professional wrestler, actor and fitness coach. He is also known for his tenures in WWE, where he performed on the NXT brand, and All Elite Wrestling (AEW), where he mostly appeared on AEW Dark.

== Early life ==
Prior to his wrestling career, Bononi played American football for São Paulo Storm in the Brazilian football league, being named to the São Paulo state team and the All Brazilian team.

== Professional wrestling career ==
=== Brazilian independent circuit (2014–2016) ===
Bononi trained to be a professional wrestler under Bob Júnior of the Brazilian Wrestling Federation (BWF), and competed on the independent circuit in his native Brazil and South America under the ring name V8 Big Block. In the BWF, he held the BWF Rei Do Ringue ("King of the Ring") Championship on one occasion in 2015.

=== WWE (2016–2020) ===
In October 2015, Bononi was announced as part of a class of 19 WWE recruits to begin training at the WWE Performance Center. He made his television debut on 10 May 2017 episode of NXT, losing to Aleister Black. Bononi had his first televised victory on 31 May episode of NXT, defeating Andrade "Cien" Almas. Bononi was named "Future Star of NXT" at the 2017 NXT Year-End Awards. On 17 April 2020, it was announced that he was released from his WWE contract.

=== Evolve (2018) ===
Due to WWE's business relationship with Evolve, several NXT wrestlers were allowed to participate in an independent show produced by Evolve. On October 28 at Evolve 114, Bononi debuted as the corner man to his tag partner Adrian Jaoude in his match, defeating independent wrestler Joe Gacy.

=== All Elite Wrestling (2020–2023) ===
On the 24 June 2020 episode of All Elite Wrestling's Dynamite, Bononi was spotted in the crowd along with other wrestlers where he broke up a brawl between participants of a lumberjack. Bononi would then make his in-ring debut on 29 September episode of Dark, where he teamed with Shawn Dean in a losing effort to The Gunn Club. Over the next few months, Bononi would compete sporadically on Dark in losing efforts. On the 26 January 2021 episode of Dark, Bononi would align himself with Peter Avalon. Bononi had his first win in AEW on the 3 February episode of Dark, teaming with Avalon to defeat Carlie Bravo and Shawn Dean. Bononi made his first in-ring appearance on the 4 February episode of Dynamite, teaming with Avalon in a loss to the team of Lee Johnson and Cody Rhodes. At Revolution, Bononi and Avalon took part in the Tag Team Casino Battle Royale in a losing effort. After the end of Dark in May, Bononi had his contract terminated with AEW.

=== Independent circuit (2023–present) ===
After leaving AEW in 2023, Bononi continued to make appearances on the independent circuit while focusing on his career as a fitness coach in Orlando, Florida. In 2025, Bononi stated that he did not intend to return to television wrestling with WWE or AEW, citing the grueling schedule associated with working for major wrestling promotions. He said that he preferred to focus on his career as a fitness coach while continuing to wrestle on the independent circuit on a selective basis. As a fitness coach, Bononi has worked with wrestlers including Ethan Page, Eddie Kingston, Daniel Garcia, and others.

Later in 2023, Bononi joined Boca Raton Championship Wrestling. He defeated Ozzy Kilmeister in NWA/BRCW Boca Versus The World event. With Noah Kekoa, he formed the "Son of Boa" tag team and they won the BCRW Tag Team Championship, after defeating Matt Riddle and Stallion Rogers at BRCW November Knockdown 2025. Bononi also returned to the BWF, competing in two matches on the television program BWF Telecatch na Band. He defeated Taylor Skinner and later challenged Acce for the BWF Brazilian Championship, with the match ending in a no contest. He also has had appearances on Game Changer Wrestling.

== Championships and accomplishments ==
- Boca Raton Championship Wrestling
  - BRCW Tag Team Championship (1 time, current) – with Noah Kekoa
- Brazilian Wrestling Federation
  - BWF Rei Do Ringue Championship (1 time)
- Pro Wrestling Illustrated
  - Ranked No. 423 of the top 500 singles wrestlers in the PWI 500 in 2019
- WWE
  - NXT Year-End Award (1 time)
    - Future Star of NXT (2017)
