= Coastal Championship Wrestling =

American independent wrestling promotion

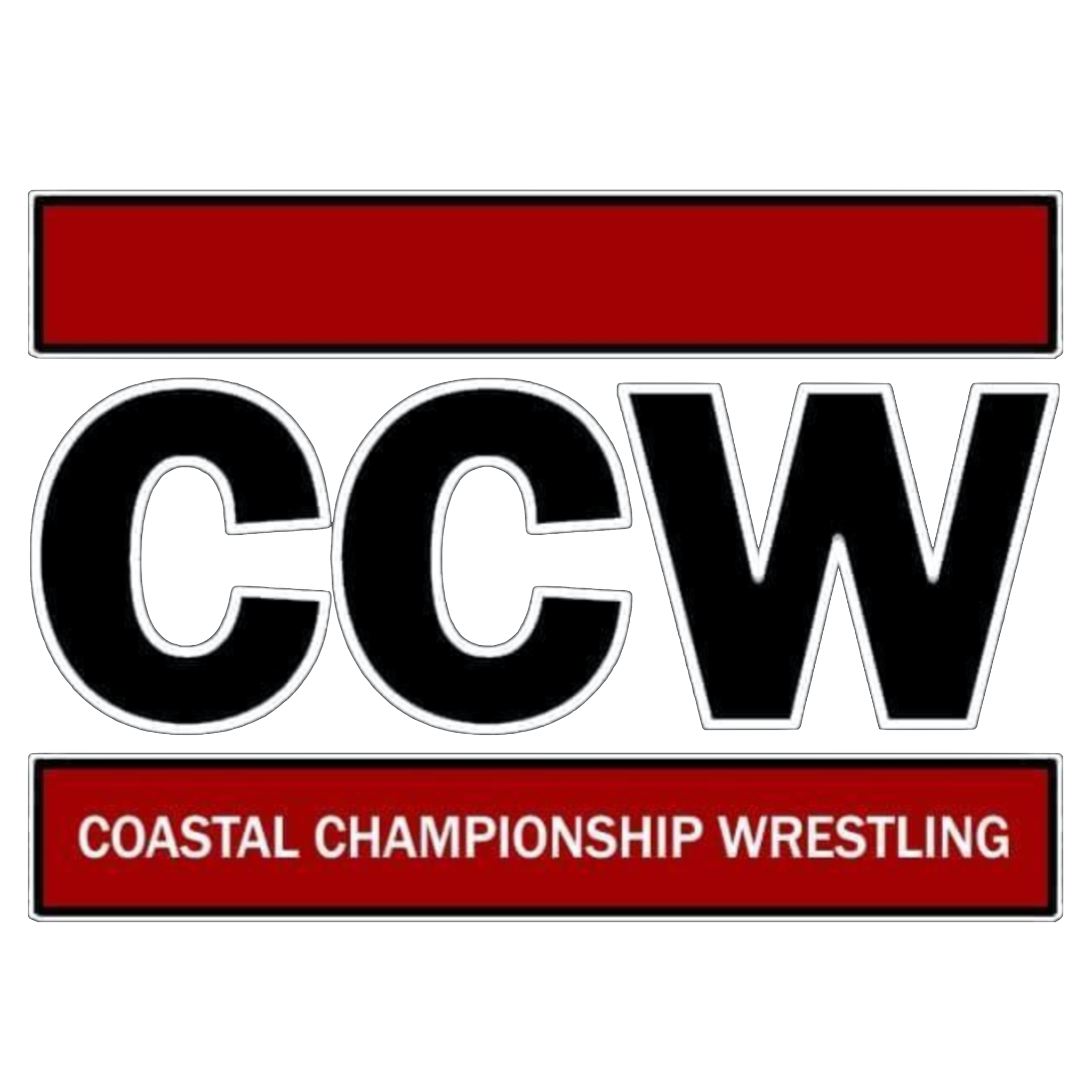
- Acronym: CCW
- Founded: 2004
- Style: professional wrestling
- Headquarters: Pompano Beach, Florida
- Founder(s): Bruno Sassi, Dan Ackerman
- Owner(s): Bruno Sassi and Dan Ackerman (2004 - 2012); Pablo Márquez and Dan Ackerman (2012 - 2020); Nelio Cuomo Costa and Dan Ackerman (2020 - present)
- Website: www.coastalchampionshipwrestlingfl.com

Coastal Championship Wrestling (CCW) is an American independent professional wrestling promotion which was formed in 2004 by Dan Ackerman & former ECW worker, Bruno Sassi in Coral Springs, Florida. The promotion has also been a member of the United Wrestling Network (UWN) since 2025 and has aired their programming as part of a joint syndicated block with the UWN on various television stations.

Notable mainstays for the promotion include Marti Belle, Brian Cage, Francisco Ciatso, Fuego Del Sol, Gangrel, Leila Grey, Matthew Justice, Kilynn King, Ariel Levy, Chase Stevens, Super Crazy, Jack Talos, Marina Tucker, Eddie Valentine, American Top Team, Billy Gunn, Kamille and Snuka. CCW had brief association with National Wrestling Alliance on CCW/NWA Viva Revolution in 2024. Championships from other companies have also been defended on CCW programming, such as Boca Raton Championship Wrestling, Original Championship Wrestling, and New Generation Championship Wrestling.

== History ==
Sassi formed the promotion in 2004 upon leaving Future of Wrestling, with Dan Ackerman. The first events and TV tapings were held in March 2004. First CCW Heavyweight Champion, "The Blackheart" Dave Johnson, won the championship in a tournament held at CCW Caged At The Creek on August 14, 2004, in Coconut Creek, Florida. The first CCW Tag Team Champions were crowned in a tournament final at a TV taping on April 24, 2004, in Coral Springs, Florida, when The Market Crashers defeated 'The Waverunners'.

Later in 2012, Sassi left CCW to Dan Ackerman and Pablo Marquez, former CCW Heavyweight Champion. Both led the promotion for 8 years and Marquez eventually opted out of the leadership. Nelio Cuomo Costa joined CCW as a co-owner in 2020.

=== Championship Wrestling from Florida ===
In November 2023, CCW announced to revive the historical Championship Wrestling from Florida (CWF). Originally founded by Cowboy Luttrall in 1949 and later run by Eddie Graham, CWF produced wrestling legends like Dusty Rhodes, Jack and Jerry Brisco, and Ric Flair. The promotion closed in 1987, but CCW, led by Nelio Cuomo Costa and Dan Ackerman, resurrected it, with Kevin Sullivan, Bill Alfonso, and Gangrel involved. The first tapings of the new CWF were held in May 2023, at the CCW Arena in Pompano Beach, Florida.

=== CCW Magazine ===
CCW Magazine
- Categories: Professional wrestling
- Founder: Nelio Cuomo Costa
- Founded: 2021
- First issue: 2021
- Company: CCW
- Country: USA
- Based in: Florida
- Language: English
- Website: ccwfanzine.com

CCW Magazine was the official professional wrestling magazine of Coastal Championship Wrestling. This incarnation of the magazine contained opinions, previews, entertainment, work out tips, and other information. Originally known as CCW Fanzine from 2021 to 2023. CCW Magazine was launched and ran from 2021 to 2023. The final issues were published in-house by CCW.

== Programming and events ==
=== Current ===
==== CCW Alive Wrestling ====
CCW Alive Wrestling is a weekly web television program that airs on CCW's YouTube channel. The series debuted on August 28, 2020. It acts as a pre-show to major events.

==== Bash At the Brew ====
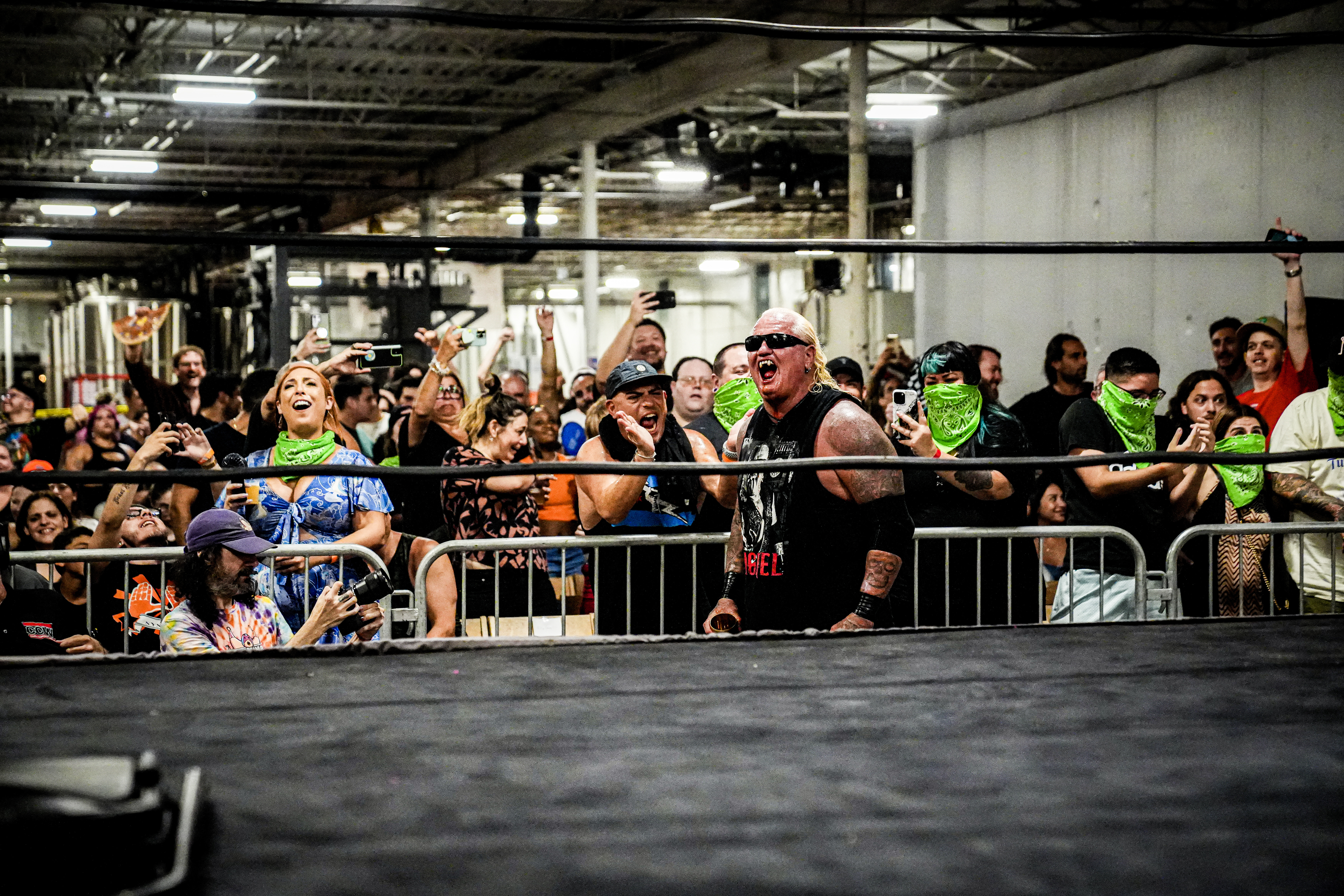
Gangrel at Bash at the Brew 42

Bash At The Brew is a flagship program of CCW that airs on its YouTube channel. According to the New York Times, CCW partnered with Unbranded Brewing Company (defunct) to produce monthly matches. The series debuted on February 6, 2021, originally airing on the CCW's channel.

==== Rumble in the Jungle ====
Another web television program of CCW, Rumble in the Jungle is produced in Tripping Animals Brewing. The first show of this program was taped on February 24, 2024.

=== Major events ===
CCW has produced 432 chronological events. The first event took place on March 20, 2004, in Coral Springs, Florida at the Coral Springs Gymnasium. Coral Springs Gymnasium in Coral Springs has held the most events.

== Championships and accomplishments ==
=== Current champions ===
Champions as of December 31, 2025
Championship	Current champion(s)	Date won	No. of days held	No. of reigns	Location	Person(s) defeated Event	Ref.
CCW Heavyweight Championship	Gangrel	August 23, 2025	130+	2	Port St. Lucie, Florida	Eddie Valentine; CCW Summer Glory 2025.	
CCW Cruiserweight Championship	Marvin Cruz	October 04, 2025	88+	1	Miami, Florida	Chris Farrow; CCW Bash At The Brew 57.	
CCW International Championship	Heddi Karaoui	October 25, 2024	432+	1	Nashville, Tennessee	Toby Farley; Halloween Hardcore Heaven.	
CCW Southeastern Heavyweight Championship	Ariel Levy	October 25, 2025	67+	1	Miami, Florida	Domino CCW Vice City Slam 3.	
CCW Tag Team Championship	The Five Star Era (ERA & Ricky Martinez)	October 25, 2025	67+	2 (3,2)	Miami, Florida	The Wild Stallions (Matt Riddle & Stallion Rogers); Vice City Slam 3.	
CCW Tennessee Championship	Meto	November 15, 2025	46+	1	Nashville, Tennessee	Dillon McQueen; CCW Over The Top.	
CCW Women's Championship	Kristin Blaze	March 28, 2026	3+	1	Miami, Florida	Nikki Blackheart CCW Vice City Slam 4.	

=== Coasty Awards ===
==== Male Wrestler of the Year ====
Year	Wrestler
2022	Alan "S2S" Martinez
2023	Jackal Stevens

==== Female Wrestler of the Year ====
Year	Wrestler
2023	Ruthie Jay

==== Kevin Dunn Award ====
Year	Wrestler
2022	Chad Huckabee
2023	Brad Owens

==== Moment of the Year ====
Year	Moment
2022	Ariel Levy Turns On Vinicious (Bash At The Brew 16)
2023	The Bus Gets Married In The Ring

==== Match of the Year ====
Year	Match
2022	Santos v. Cha Cha Charlie (Bash At The Brew 11)
2023	Game of War

==== Feud of the Year ====
Year	Feud
2022	Marina Tucker v. KiLynn King
2023	Ricky Martinez v. Alex Chamberlain

== Roster ==
=== Wrestlers ===
- Marti Belle
- Brian Brock
- Brian Cage
- Sofi Castillo
- Cha Cha Charlie
- Alex Chamberlain
- Dr Eric Christopher
- Francisco Ciatso
- D3
- Ashley DAmboise
- Rico De La Vega
- Fuego Del Sol
- Kahagas (2005–2012)
- Ricky Vega (2005–2007)
- Soulman Alex G (2006)
- Phi Delta Slam (2004)
- Hit Row
- Abraham Washington
- Leva Bates
- Chris Farrow
- Damian Fenrir
- Gangrel
- Leila Grey
- Invidia
- Ruthie Jay
- Christi Jaynes
- Matthew Justice
- Daisy Kill
- Ozzy Kilmeister
- Kilynn King
- Noah King
- Labrava
- Lakay
- Ariel Levy
- Ricky Martinez
- Anna Diaz
- Big English
- ERA
- Facade
- Alan Martinez
- Meto
- Dani Mo
- Jonny Nova
- Reeves Portman
- Elliott Qrow
- Romeo Quevedo
- Valentina Rossi
- Luke Sampson
- El Jefe Santos
- Lew Spectre
- Chase Stevens
- Jackal Stevens
- Super Crazy
- Jack Talos
- Marina Tucker
- Wrangler Nick Turner
- Eddie Valentine
- Jai Vidal
- Vinicious

Vecna

=== Appearances ===
- Great Sasuke
- The Hurricane
- Brooklyn Brawler
- Carlito
- Serpentico
- Santana Garrett
- Rebel
- Rachel Ellering
- Mercedes Martinez
- Ivelisse Velez
- Pablo Marquez
- Sexy Star
- Matt Striker
- Alberto El Patron
- Avery Taylor
- Skyler Ramirez
- The GOAT
- Leva Bates
- Snot Dudley
- Danny Burch
- Vanilla Vargas
- Konnor (wrestler)
- Rick Link
- Kirby Mack
- Vordell Walker
- Buck Quartermain
- The Headbangers
- Scotty 2 Hotty

== Training school ==
CCW training facility previously known as the Main Event Training Center is a professional wrestling school owned by CCW. It serves as a training and tryout facility for wrestlers. CCW currently operates one location in Pompano Beach, Florida founded in 2007 by Sassi and Ackerman, back then Pablo Marquez headed the training facility, Now Gangrel is head trainer of the school. It is considered to be the longest-running professional wrestling school in the Southeastern United States.

=== Wrestlers trained ===
Names	Notes	Ref
Montel Vontavious Porter	Wrestled for WWE and Impact Wrestling as MVP	
Kaitlyn	Wrestled for WWE as Caleste Bonin	
Miro	Wrestled for WWE and AEW as Rusev	
Paige VanZant	Wrestled for All Elite Wrestling as VanZant	
Jacob Fatu	Wrestled for Major League Wrestling	
Marina Tucker	Wrestled for Women of Wrestling	
Jai Vidal	Wrestled for Impact Wrestling	
Lola Vice	Wrestled for WWE NXT brand as Valerie Loureda	
Santos	Wrestled for National Wrestling Alliance	
KiLynn King	Wrestled for Impact Wrestling	

=== Trainers ===
Names	Notes	Ref
David Heath	Wrestled for World Wrestling Federation and AEW as Gangrel	

== Reception ==
CCW has been received very positively, gaining praise for their in-ring work, production, training school and fanbase. Wrestlers such as Eddie Valentine, Josh Woods and Caleste have publicly spoken positively of the promotion.
