= Madman Fulton =

American professional wrestler

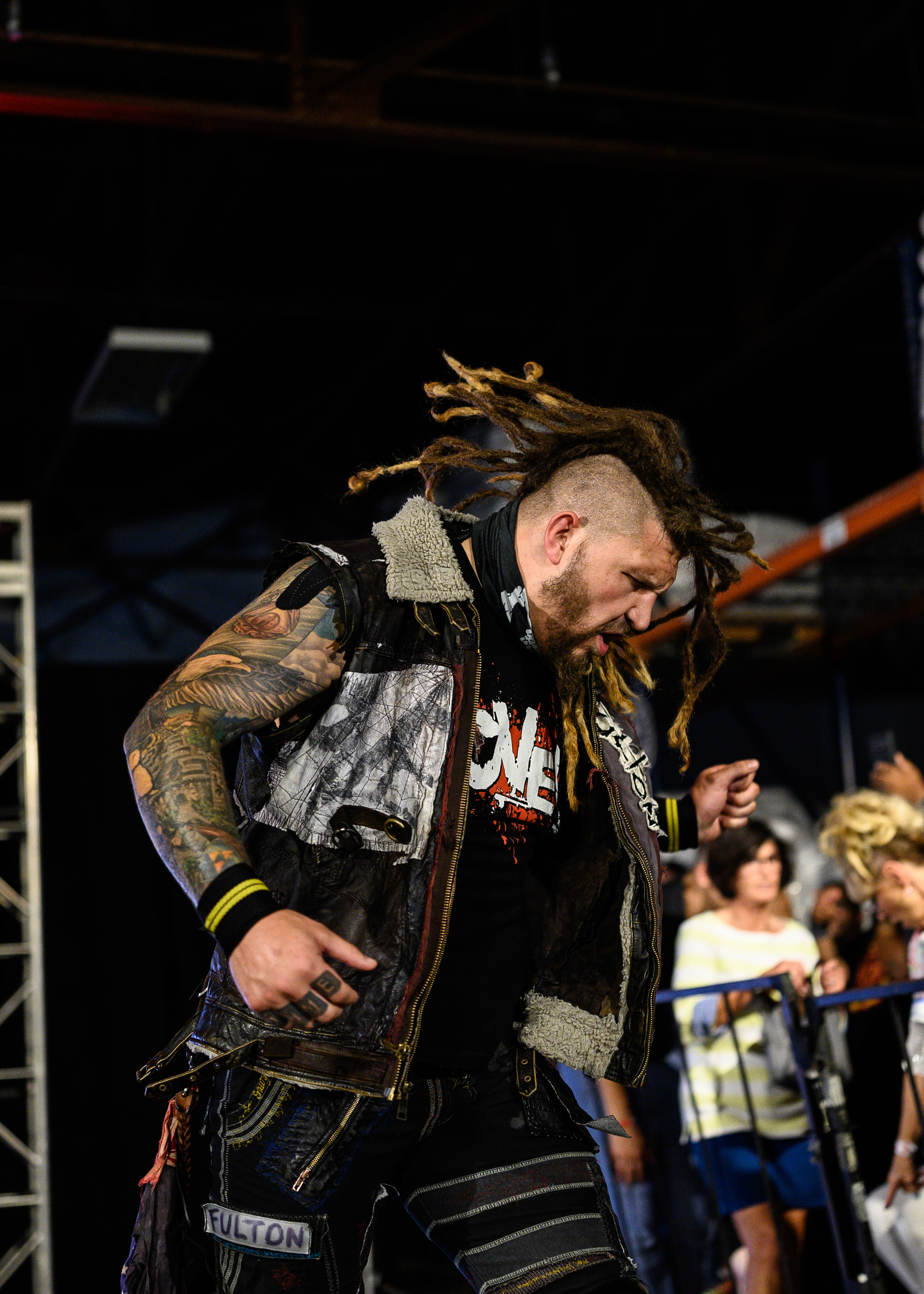
- Fulton in 2019

Personal information
- Born: Jacob Southwick; April 2, 1990 (age 36) Toledo, Ohio, U.S.
- Education: Ashland University

Professional wrestling career
- Ring name(s): Big Jake South; Fulton; Madman Fulton; Sawyer Fulton
- Billed height: 6 ft 8 in (203 cm)
- Billed weight: 319 lb (145 kg)
- Billed from: Toledo, Ohio
- Trained by: Jimmie Lee
- Debut: 2009

Jacob Southwick (born April 2, 1990), better known by his ring name Madman Fulton, is an American professional wrestler. He is currently performing on the independent circuit mononymously as Fulton. He is best known for his time with Impact Wrestling, where he was a member of Ohio Versus Everything; and in WWE on its NXT brand under the ring name Sawyer Fulton, where he was a member of Sanity.

== Early life ==
Southwick was born on April 2, 1990, in Toledo, Ohio. He trained under Jimmie Lee. Southwick attended Ashland University, where he was a former Greco-Roman All-American and a two-time NCAA All-American amateur wrestler. He cited Kurt Angle as his favorite wrestler growing up.

== Professional wrestling career ==
=== Mid-Ohio Wrestling (2009-2012) ===
Southwick trained to be a professional wrestler at the ASWA Pro Wrestling Training Center in Mansfield, Ohio. He made his professional wrestling debut for Mid-Ohio Wrestling as "Big Jake South" on October 16, 2009, defeating Izzy Lambert. He won the Mid-Ohio Tag Team Titles with Cyrus Poe, and challenged unsuccessfully for various other championships within the promotion including as the Tri-County Heavyweight Championship and the World Championship.

=== WWE (2012–2017) ===
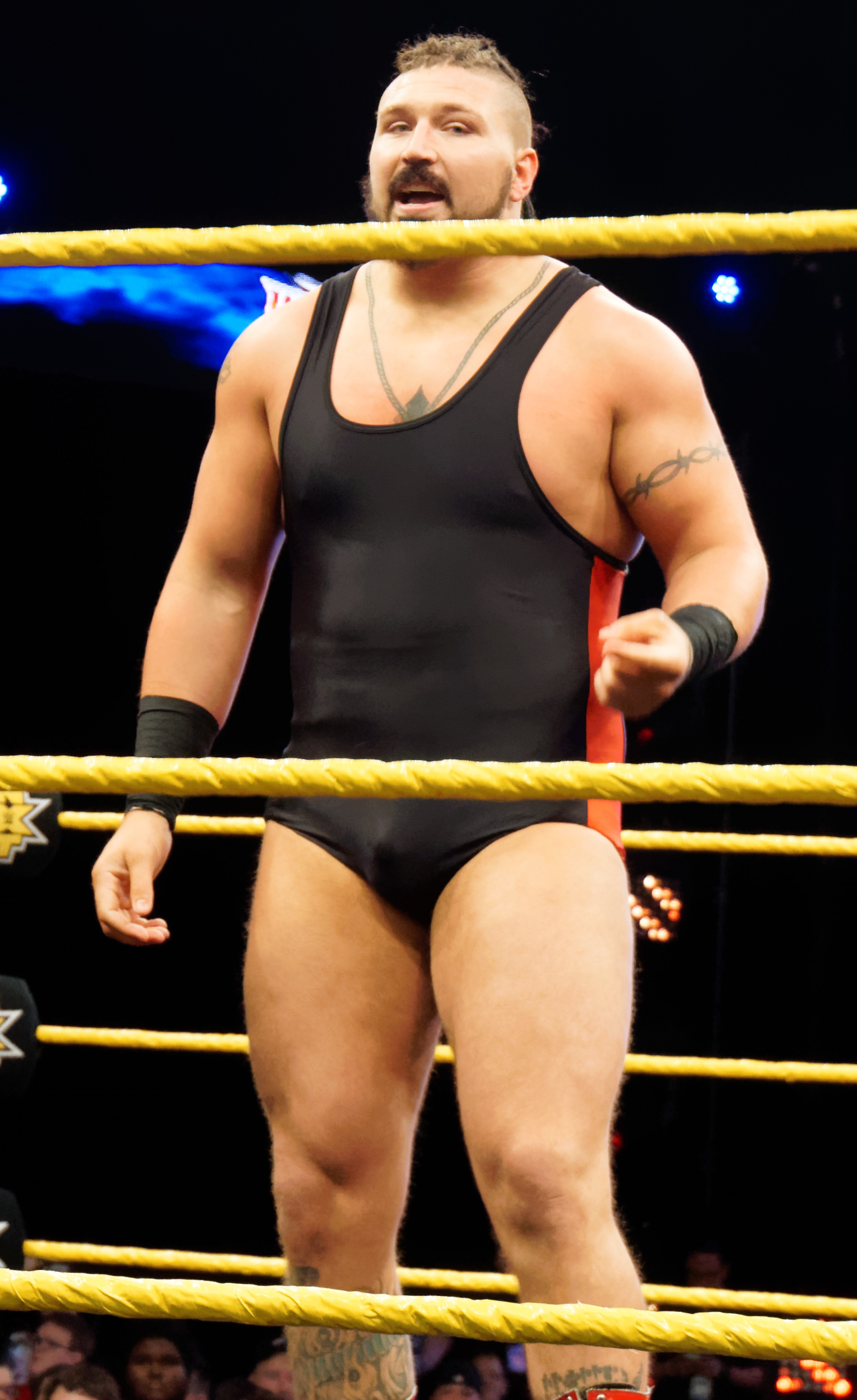
During his time in NXT, Southwick performed as "Sawyer Fulton".

In September 2012 it was reported that Southwick had signed with WWE. He was later renamed "Sawyer Fulton". He made his televised NXT debut on May 2, 2013, where he appeared as an enhancement talent in a tag-team match against The Wyatt Family (Erick Rowan and Luke Harper). He then continued to make sporadic televised appearances on NXT as an enhancement talent over the next three years, often as part of a tag-team with Angelo Dawkins with the duo being defeated by teams such as Enzo Amore and Colin Cassady, The Vaudevillains, Blake and Murphy and The Hype Bros.

In March 2016, Fulton formed a tag-team with Alexander Wolfe at NXT live events. In September 2016, Fulton and Wolfe joined a stable named Sanity along with Eric Young and Nikki Cross. The stable made its debut on the October 12, 2016 episode of NXT, with Wolfe and Fulton defeating the team of Bobby Roode and Tye Dillinger as part of the 2016 Dusty Rhodes Tag Team Classic. On November 2, in the second round of the Tag Team Classic, Fulton and Wolfe beat fan favourites T. J. Perkins and Kota Ibushi. They were knocked out of the tournament in the semi-finals by TM61. Fulton subsequently suffered a torn pectoral muscle which ruled him out of action for several months. At the NXT tapings on November 30, 2016, it was teased that Fulton was no longer associated with SAnitY after Eric Young stomped on Fulton's jacket before kicking it out of the ring. He was later replaced in the group by Killian Dain, with no on-screen explanation provided for his absence. On November 3, 2017, Fulton was released from his NXT contract by the WWE without making another televised appearance.

=== Major League Wrestling (2018) ===
In the summer of 2018, Fulton began appearing as a member of Sami Callihan's Death Machines stable in Major League Wrestling, where he participated in the Battle Riot event and a War Games match.

=== Impact Wrestling (2019–2024) ===
==== Ohio Versus Everything (2019–2020) ====
On the March 22, 2019 episode of Impact!, Southwick made his debut for Impact Wrestling under the ring name "Madman Fulton" as the newest member of oVe. He attacked Rich Swann and revealed an oVe shirt after taking off his jacket. Fulton made his in-ring debut on the April 5 episode of Impact! by teaming with oVe leader Sami Callihan to defeat Swann and Willie Mack in a tag team match. Fulton wrestled his first singles match for the promotion on the April 19 episode of Impact!, in which he defeated Tommy Dreamer. Fulton was mainly used as oVe's bodyguard and often teamed with them in six-man and eight-man tag team matches. At A Night You Can't Mist, Fulton teamed with Dave Crist and Jake Crist against The Rascalz in a losing effort. At Bash at the Brewery, the trio lost to Rich Swann, Tessa Blanchard and Willie Mack in a six-person tag team match. Fulton would then team with Jake Crist to take on Brian Cage and Tessa Blanchard in a losing effort at Prelude to Glory.

Fulton made his pay-per-view debut for Impact at the Bound for Glory event on October 20, 2019, where he participated in the Call Your Shot Gauntlet match, which he failed to win. At No Surrender, Fulton defeated Acey Romero, Brian Cage, Crash Jaxon and Willie Mack in a Hoss Fight Scramble. In early 2020, Fulton would engage in a feud with Ken Shamrock, which culminated in a match between the two at Hard To Kill, which Fulton lost. At Sacrifice, Fulton teamed with Dave Crist to take on XXXL (Acey Romero and Larry D) in a losing effort. At the Rebellion special, Fulton, Dave Crist and Jake Crist lost to Crazzy Steve, Rhino and Tommy Dreamer in a six-man tag team match. Later at the event, Sami Callihan ended his association with the group by attacking them during their interference in his match against Ken Shamrock. On the May 12 episode of Impact!, Fulton participated in a tournament to determine the #1 contender for the Impact World Championship, losing to Hernandez in the opening round. On the May 19 episode of Impact!, after Dave Crist lost to Crazzy Steve, Fulton attacked Dave Crist and Jake Crist and announced that he was quitting oVe, thus disbanding the group.

==== Alliance with Ace Austin (2020–2022) ====
On the June 16 episode of Impact!, Fulton allied himself with Ace Austin by helping him in defeating Eddie Edwards in a match. The following week, on Impact!, Fulton defeated Edwards. Austin and Fulton would soon begin feuding with the debuting Good Brothers (Doc Gallows and Karl Anderson), which led to a match between the two teams at Emergence, which Austin and Fulton lost. On the March 31, 2022 tapings of Impact Wrestling, Fulton lost to Josh Alexander in under two minutes, in his last appearance for the promotion. In August, it was reported that Fulton was gone from Impact.

==== Return to Impact Wrestling/TNA (2023–2024) ====
On June 5, Impact announced that Fulton will return to team with Callihan and Crist as oVe to take on The Design (Deaner, Kon, and Angels) in an Ohio Street Fight at Against All Odds. At the event on June 9, oVe defeated The Design in an Ohio Street Fight. on the June 21 episode of Impact!, oVe (Fulton, Jake Crist and Sami Callihan) lost to Brian Myers and The Good Hands (Jason Hotch and John Skyler).

Fulton would later be reported to have left Impact Wrestling. However, he would make his return to the promotion, now rebranded as Total Nonstop Action Wrestling (TNA), on the August 22, 2024 episode of Impact, where he was put in a mixed tag team match by Matt Cardona alongside Kon and Steph De Lander against PCO, Rhyno and Xia Brookside in a losing effort.

=== Independent circuit (2017–present) ===
After his release from WWE, Southwick changed his ring name to "Madman Fulton". He made his American States Wrestling Alliance return on December 9, 2017 at ASWA Winter Reunion, where he and wrestlers Ethan Wright and JJ DeVille won the Winter Reunion Battle Royal. He later met Wright and DeVille in a three-way match to crown the new ASWA Universal Champion however, did not succeed in winning the title. This was his first ASWA event in six years since making his ASWA debut in 2011. On January 20, 2018, Madman Fulton made his Pro Wrestling Magic (PWM) debut at PWM Domino, in a title match for the PWM Heavyweight Championship held by EC Negro. Later in 2023, Fulton made his Boca Raton Championship Wrestling debut at the BRCW Heavyweight Championship where he defeated Curt Stallion.

== Other media ==
Fulton made his first and only appearance as a playable character in WWE 2K18.

== Championships and accomplishments ==
- AAW Wrestling
  - AAW Tag Team Championship (1 time) – with Ace Austin
- American States Wrestling Alliance
  - ASWA Heavyweight Championship (1 time)
- Atomic Wrestling Entertainment / Atomic Revolutionary Wrestling/ Atomic Legacy Wrestling
  - ALW Hardcore Championship (1 time)
  - AWE / ARW Tag Team Championship (1 time) – with Vertigo Rivera
- Battle On The Border
  - BOTB Heavyweight Championship (1 time)
  - BOTB Tag Team Championship (1 time) – with Kongo Kong
- Boca Raton Championship Wrestling
  - BRCW Heavyweight Championship (1 time)
- Insane Wrestling Revolution
  - IWR World Heavyweight Championship (1 time)
  - Insane Rumble (2025)
- Main Event Wrestling
  - MEW Championship (1 time, inaugural)
- Mid-Ohio Wrestling
  - Mid-Ohio Tag Team Championship (1 time) – with Cyrus Poe
- Pro Wrestling Illustrated
  - Ranked No. 173 of the top 500 singles wrestlers in the PWI 500 in 2019
- Revolution Championship Wrestling
  - RCW Heavyweight Championship (1 time)
- The Wrestling Revolver
  - Revolver Tag Team Championship (2 times) – with Krule (1) and Krule and Alan Angels (1)
- Xtreme World Wrestling
  - XWW Tag Team Championship (1 time) – with Ace Austin
