= WWE World at WrestleMania =

WWE convention

WWE World at WrestleMania WrestleMania Fan Axxess
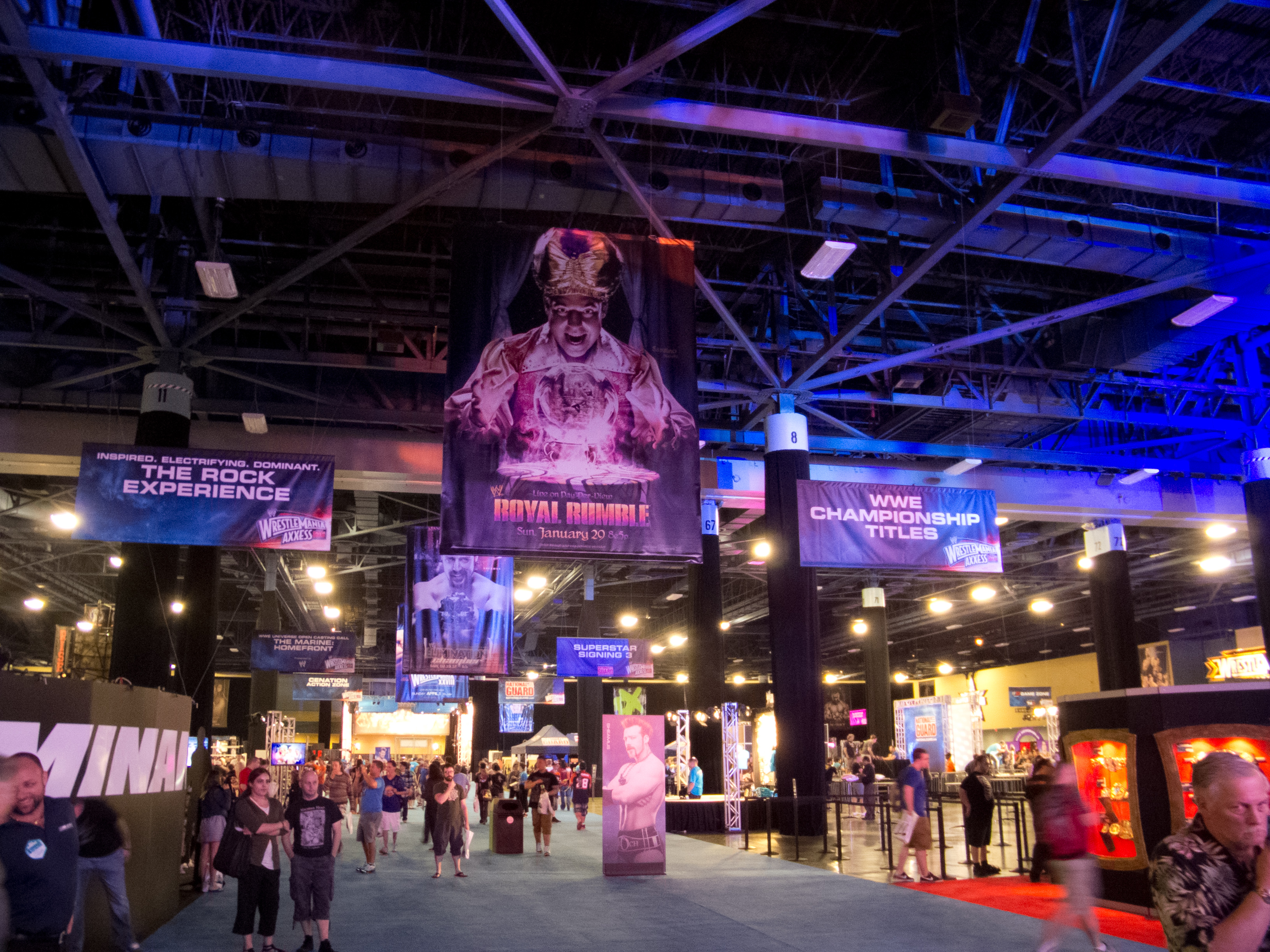
- WrestleMania XXVIII Fan Axxess in 2012
- Status: Active
- Genre: Professional wrestling
- Country: United States
- Inaugurated: 1988
- Organizer: WWE; Fanatics Events (2024–present)
- Filing status: Corporate

WWE World at WrestleMania, formerly known as WrestleMania Fan Axxess or simply WrestleMania Axxess, is a professional wrestling fan convention held by WWE during the week of WrestleMania. The event typically runs for four to five days—from Thursday to Sunday or Monday—and features WWE talent and alumni autograph signings, interviews, fan activities, memorabilia displays, meet-and-greets, and matches. WrestleMania Axxess was briefly discontinued from 2020 due to the COVID-19 pandemic, but was relaunched as WWE World, in partnership with Fanatics Events, at WrestleMania beginning with WrestleMania XL in 2024.

== History ==
The first event happened in 1988, when the World Wrestling Federation (WWF, now known as WWE) in association with The Trump Organization prepared a small festival to celebrate WrestleMania IV. It included autograph signings, a brunch, and a five kilometer run; the event was held again in 1989 for WrestleMania V. In 1992, a festival was held the day of WrestleMania VIII which included a WWF wrestler look-alike contest and a tournament for the WWF WrestleFest arcade game. In 1993, the WWF held a "WrestleMania Brunch" the day of WrestleMania IX at Caesars Palace, during the course of which Lex Luger attacked Bret Hart. In 1994, the WWF offered "Fan Fest" for the weekend of WrestleMania X, which allowed fans to step inside a WWF ring, participate in games, meet wrestlers, and purchase merchandise; the event was followed up in 1995 with another "Fan Fest" for WrestleMania XI. In 1999, the WWF held its first Saturday pre-WrestleMania event taking place on March 27, 1999. WrestleMania Rage Party, as it was known, was televised live on the USA Network from 10:00 p.m. to 11:00 p.m. (EST). The event was to be held at the Pennsylvania Convention Center. The idea of the event was "...to celebrate the final WrestleMania of the millennium..."

The following year, the WWF held its first WrestleMania Axxess event at the Anaheim Convention Center expanding upon the party idea of WrestleMania Rage Party. The event included autograph signings and mementos of inductees of the WWE Hall of Fame. There were also activities where fans could enter a wrestling ring and commentate a wrestling match. In 2001, WrestleMania Axxess was held at the Reliant Hall which expanded upon the event by adding numerous activities including areas where attendees could buy special merchandise, see a production truck, and check out special WWE vehicles. In 2002, WrestleMania Axxess was extended to a three-day event and was held at the National Trade Centre (now Enercare Centre). The three-day event included similar activities to that of the one-day line-up. In 2007, WrestleMania Axxess went on tour around cities in both the United States and Canada. In recent years, Axxess has become a four-day event, with one session on Thursday, Friday, and Sunday, and three sessions on Saturday.

Since 2013, NXT matches have been held at WrestleMania Axxess, and since 2017, matches from various independent promotions have been held, such as Insane Championship Wrestling, Progress Wrestling, and Evolve. In 2018, WWE held four invitational tournaments for NXT championship matches. The winners of the WWE United Kingdom Championship Invitational, NXT North American Championship Invitational, NXT Tag Team Championship Invitational, and NXT Women's Championship Invitational tournaments received matches for the respective titles on April 8.

WWE cancelled the traditional WrestleMania Axxess events since 2020 due to the onset of the COVID-19 pandemic and subsequently announced that the 2022 event during WrestleMania 38 weekend will be replaced by a Superstore Axxess shop with superstar panels and premium experiences. Unlike previous events, no live wrestling matches and only a limited amount of autograph signings were involved for the 2023 event.

For WrestleMania XL in April 2024, WWE, in partnership with Fanatics Events, relaunched the convention under a new name of WWE World at WrestleMania and was held at the Pennsylvania Convention Center. The event ran from Thursday, April 4 until Monday, April 8. The five-day event included interview panel sessions with WWE wrestlers, a WWE 2K24 gaming tournament, live podcast recordings, meet-and-greets with wrestlers, and a large merchandise store with various memorabilia honoring WrestleMania's 40-year history.

== WrestleMania Superstore ==
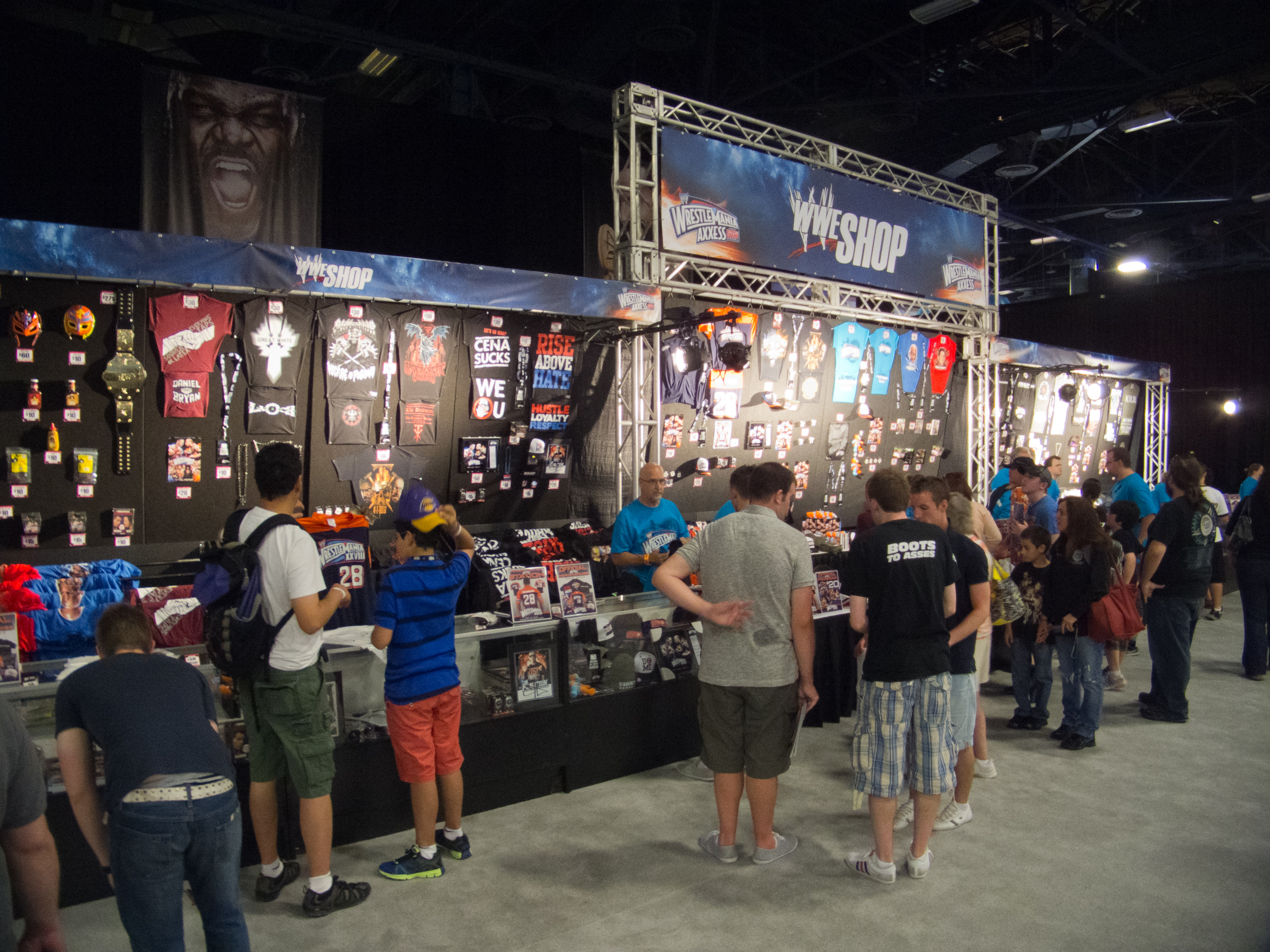
Merchandise shop at WrestleMania XXVIII Axxess

Every year during the week leading up to WrestleMania, the WrestleMania Superstore is open at the convention. The WrestleMania Superstore has "the largest selection of WrestleMania and WWE merchandise under one roof". It has over 700 items and includes exclusive Superstore-only merchandise. The store is open to the public, and no ticket is required.

== WWE Superstar statue ==
Beginning in 2013, WWE has honored more famous wrestlers by displaying a statue of them at WrestleMania Axxess. This has not occurred every year, with no statue being unveiled in 2018 and 2023. In 2024, Bray Wyatt was represented in two statues, one for his general attire and another in his "Fiend" attire that was never used.

Date	Statue	Location	Venue	WrestleMania	Ref
April 3, 2013	André the Giant	East Rutherford, New Jersey	Izod Center	29	
April 3, 2014	Bruno Sammartino	New Orleans, Louisiana	Ernest N. Morial Convention Center	XXX	
March 26, 2015	Ultimate Warrior	San Jose, California	San Jose Convention Center	31	
March 31, 2016	Dusty Rhodes	Dallas, Texas	Kay Bailey Hutchison Convention Center	32	
March 30, 2017	Ric Flair	Orlando, Florida	Orange County Convention Center	33	
April 4, 2019	Roddy Piper	Brooklyn, New York	Pier 12	35	
March 31, 2022	The Undertaker	Dallas, Texas	Kay Bailey Hutchison Convention Center	38	
April 6, 2024	Bray Wyatt	Philadelphia, Pennsylvania	Pennsylvania Convention Center	XL	
April 18, 2025	Triple H	Las Vegas, Nevada	Fontainebleau Las Vegas	41	
April 17, 2026	Hulk Hogan	Las Vegas, Nevada	Las Vegas Convention Center	42	

== Wrestling events ==
WrestleMania	Date(s)	Venue	Location	Main event	Notes	Ref
16	April 1, 2000	Anaheim Convention Center	Anaheim, California	N/A		
17	March 31, 2001	Reliant AstroHall	Houston, Texas	N/A		
18	March 14–15, 2002	National Trade Centre	Toronto, Ontario, Canada	Crash Holly vs. Tommy Dreamer		
18	March 14–15, 2002	National Trade Centre	Toronto, Ontario, Canada	Hardcore Holly vs. Maven		
25	April 2–5, 2009	Reliant Center	Houston, Texas	Jimmy Wang Yang vs. Paul Burchill		
25	April 2–5, 2009	Reliant Center	Houston, Texas	Cryme Tyme (JTG and Shad) vs. Ezekiel Jackson and Brian Kendrick		
25	April 2–5, 2009	Reliant Center	Houston, Texas	Goldust vs. Mike Knox		
25	April 2–5, 2009	Reliant Center	Houston, Texas	Dolph Ziggler vs. Sim Snuka		
26	March 26–27, 2010	Phoenix Convention Center	Phoenix, Arizona	Justin Gabriel vs. Michael Tarver		
26	March 26–27, 2010	Phoenix Convention Center	Phoenix, Arizona	Jimmy Wang Yang vs. Vance Archer		
27	March 31–April 2, 2011	Georgia World Congress Center	Atlanta, Georgia	Daniel Bryan vs. Ted DiBiase Jr.		
27	March 31–April 2, 2011	Georgia World Congress Center	Atlanta, Georgia	Rob Dyrdek and Roddy Piper vs. Tyson Kidd and Zack Ryder		
27	March 31–April 2, 2011	Georgia World Congress Center	Atlanta, Georgia	Drew McIntyre vs. Chris Masters		
28	March 29–April 1, 2012	Miami Beach Convention Center	Miami Beach, Florida	The Usos (Jey Uso and Jimmy Uso) vs. Epico and Primo in a non title match		
28	March 29–April 1, 2012	Miami Beach Convention Center	Miami Beach, Florida	Seth Rollins vs. Antonio Cesaro		
28	March 29–April 1, 2012	Miami Beach Convention Center	Miami Beach, Florida	Santino Marella vs. Dolph Ziggler in a falls count anywhere match		
28	March 29–April 1, 2012	Miami Beach Convention Center	Miami Beach, Florida	Big E. Langston, Bo Dallas, and Husky Harris vs. Antonio Cesaro, Damien Sandow, and Kenneth Cameron in a six man tag team match		
29	April 4–6, 2013	IZOD Center	East Rutherford, New Jersey	Ezekiel Jackson and Yoshi Tatsu vs. Camacho and Hunico		
29	April 4–6, 2013	IZOD Center	East Rutherford, New Jersey	Sasha Banks vs. Audrey Marie		
29	April 4–6, 2013	IZOD Center	East Rutherford, New Jersey	R-Truth vs. Heath Slater		
29	April 4–6, 2013	IZOD Center	East Rutherford, New Jersey	Sami Zayn vs. Corey Graves		
30	April 5–6, 2014	Ernest N. Morial Convention Center	New Orleans, Louisiana	Paige (c) vs. Charlotte for the WWE NXT Women's Championship		
30	April 5–6, 2014	Ernest N. Morial Convention Center	New Orleans, Louisiana	Adrian Neville (c) vs. CJ Parker vs. Tyler Breeze in a triple threat match for the WWE NXT Championship		
31	March 26–29, 2015	San Jose McEnery Convention Center	San Jose, California	N/A	Featured a qualifier tournament for the André the Giant Memorial Battle Royal which aired on NXT on April 8, 2015.	
31	March 26–29, 2015	San Jose McEnery Convention Center	San Jose, California	Hideo Itami vs. Finn Balor	Featured a qualifier tournament for the André the Giant Memorial Battle Royal which aired on NXT on April 8, 2015.	
31	March 26–29, 2015	San Jose McEnery Convention Center	San Jose, California	Adrian Neville and Baron Corbin vs. CJ Parker and Mike Rawlis		
32	March 31–April 3, 2016	Kay Bailey Hutchison Convention Center	Dallas, Texas	Colin Cassady and Enzo Amore (w/Carmella) vs. Blake and Murphy (w/Alexa Bliss)		
32	March 31–April 3, 2016	Kay Bailey Hutchison Convention Center	Dallas, Texas	Apollo Crews vs. Elias Samson	Matches were taped as part of NXT	
32	March 31–April 3, 2016	Kay Bailey Hutchison Convention Center	Dallas, Texas	Patrick Clark and Tye Dillinger vs. Blake and Murphy	Matches were taped as part of NXT	
32	March 31–April 3, 2016	Kay Bailey Hutchison Convention Center	Dallas, Texas	Adrian Neville and Baron Corbin vs. CJ Parker and Mike Rawlis		
33	March 30–April 2, 2017	Orange County Convention Center	Orlando, Florida	TJ Perkins vs. Gran Metalik		
33	March 30–April 2, 2017	Orange County Convention Center	Orlando, Florida	Macey Estrella vs. Daria Berenato		
33	March 30–April 2, 2017	Orange County Convention Center	Orlando, Florida	Riddick Moss and Tino Sabbatelli vs. The Ascension (professional wrestling) (Konnor and Viktor		
33	March 30–April 2, 2017	Orange County Convention Center	Orlando, Florida	Tyler Bate (c) vs. Pete Dunne for the WWE United Kingdom Championship		
34	April 5–April 8, 2018	Ernest N. Morial Convention Center	New Orleans, Louisiana	Kairi Sane vs. Bianca Belair in a WWE NXT Women's Championship invitational first round match	Featured wrestlers from World Wrestling Network	
34	April 5–April 8, 2018	Ernest N. Morial Convention Center	New Orleans, Louisiana	Pete Dunne vs. Morgan Webster	Featured wrestlers from World Wrestling Network	
34	April 5–April 8, 2018	Ernest N. Morial Convention Center	New Orleans, Louisiana	Chris Dickinson & Jaka (w/Stokely Hathaway) (c) vs. Danny Burch and Oney Lorcan for the Evolve Tag Team Championship	Featured wrestlers from World Wrestling Network	
34	April 5–April 8, 2018	Ernest N. Morial Convention Center	New Orleans, Louisiana	Adam Cole (c) vs. Akira Tozawa for the WWE NXT North American Championship	Featured wrestlers from World Wrestling Network	
35	April 4–8, 2019	Brooklyn Pier 12	Brooklyn, New York	Roderick Strong vs. Akira Tozawa vs. Ariya Daivari vs. Dave Mastiff vs. Dominik Dijakovic vs. Drew Gulak vs. Eric Bugenhagen vs. Fabian Aichner vs. Humberto Carrillo vs. Joe Coffey vs. Ligero vs. Mark Coffey vs. Matt Riddle vs. Rinku Singh vs. Saurav Gurjar vs. Steve Cutler vs. Brian Kendrick vs. Travis Banks vs. Tyler Bate vs. Wesley Blake	Featured tapings for the Worlds Collide specials	
35	April 4–8, 2019	Brooklyn Pier 12	Brooklyn, New York	Jordan Devlin vs. Akira Tozawa	Featured tapings for the Worlds Collide specials	
35	April 4–8, 2019	Brooklyn Pier 12	Brooklyn, New York	Tyler Breeze vs. Roderick Strong	Featured tapings for the Worlds Collide specials	
35	April 4–8, 2019	Brooklyn Pier 12	Brooklyn, New York	WALTER vs. Jordan Devlin in a non title match	Featured tapings for the Worlds Collide specials	
35	April 4–8, 2019	Brooklyn Pier 12	Brooklyn, New York	Toni Storm (c) vs. Bianca Belair vs. Nikki Cross in a triple threat match for the WWE NXT UK Women's Championship	Featured tapings for the Worlds Collide specials	
41	April 17–21, 2025	Las Vegas Convention Center	Las Vegas, Nevada	Myles Borne (w/Wren Sinclair) vs. Harlem Lewis		
41	April 17–21, 2025	Las Vegas Convention Center	Las Vegas, Nevada	No Quarter Catch Crew (Myles Borne and Tavion Heights) (w/Wren Sinclair) vs. The Culling (Brooks Jensen and Niko Vance)		
41	April 17–21, 2025	Las Vegas Convention Center	Las Vegas, Nevada	Myles Borne vs. Harlem Lewis		
41	April 17–21, 2025	Las Vegas Convention Center	Las Vegas, Nevada	Fraxiom (Axiom and Nathan Frazer) vs. The Culling (Brooks Jensen and Niko Vance)		
41	April 17–21, 2025	Las Vegas Convention Center	Las Vegas, Nevada	Hank and Tank (Hank Walker and Tank Ledger) (c) vs. No Quarter Catch Crew (Myles Borne and Tavion Heights) for the WWE NXT Tag Team Championship		
42	April 16–19, 2026	Las Vegas Convention Center	Las Vegas, Nevada			
42	April 16–19, 2026	Las Vegas Convention Center	Las Vegas, Nevada	Fraxiom (Axiom and Nathan Frazer) vs. Motor City Machine Guns (Alex Shelley and Chris Sabin)	Matches were streamed live on YouTube	
42	April 16–19, 2026	Las Vegas Convention Center	Las Vegas, Nevada	Erik vs. Psycho Clown	Matches were streamed live on YouTube	
42	April 16–19, 2026	Las Vegas Convention Center	Las Vegas, Nevada	Los Americanos (Bravo Americano and Rayo Americano) vs. Myles Borne and Shiloh Hill	Matches were streamed live on YouTube	
(c) – refers to the champion(s) heading into the match

== See also ==
- List of professional wrestling conventions
