= Curt Stallion =

American professional wrestler

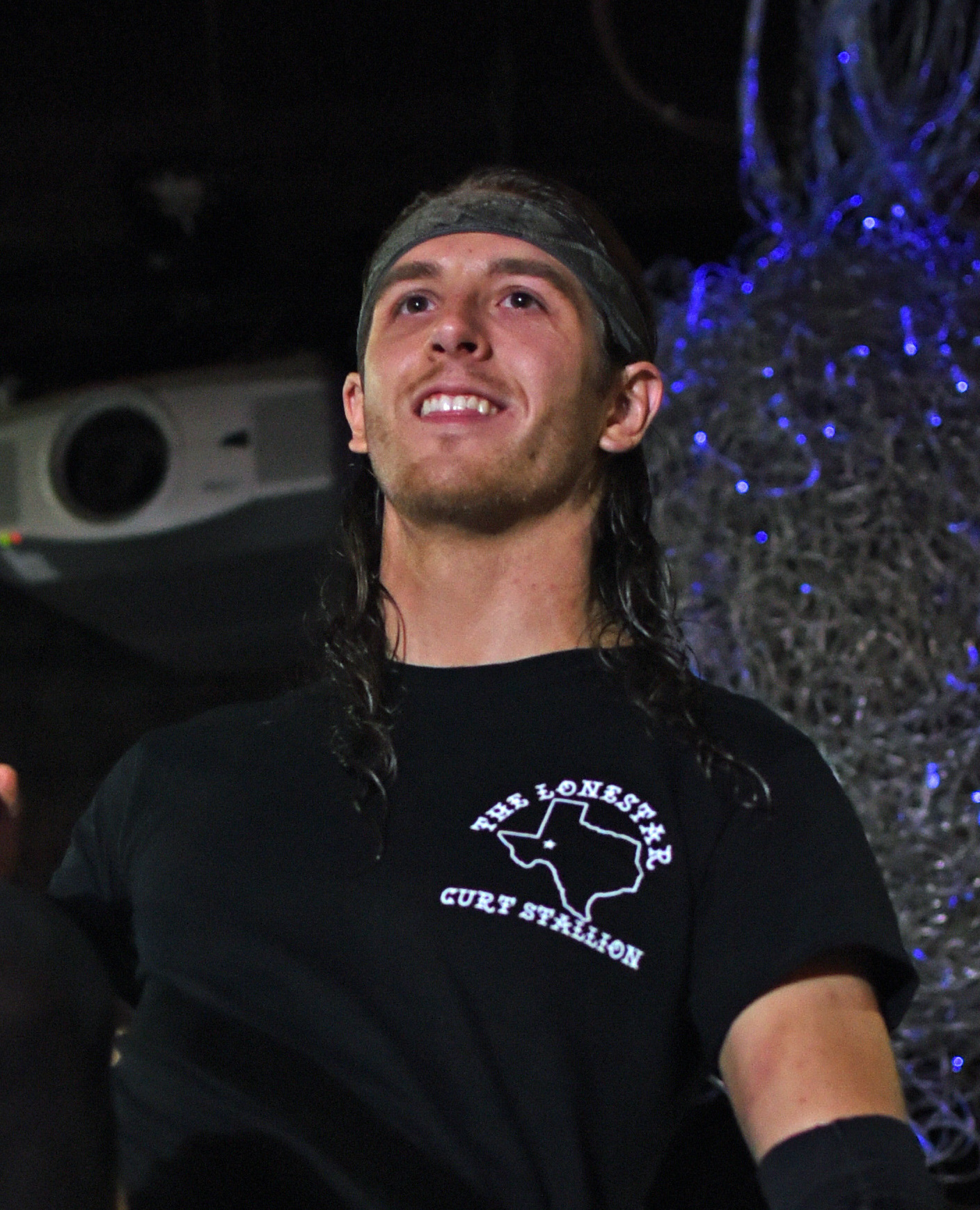
- Stallion in March 2019

Personal information
- Born: Camron Rogers; July 13, 1990 (age 36) Crane, Texas, U.S.

Professional wrestling career
- Ring name(s): Curt Stallion; Stallion Rogers
- Billed height: 6 ft 1 in (185 cm)
- Billed weight: 190 lb (86 kg)
- Billed from: Crane, Texas
- Trained by: Michael Elgin; Jastin Taylor; ACH; Kyle O'Reilly
- Debut: July 20, 2013

Camron Rogers (born July 13, 1990), better known by his ring name Curt Stallion, is an American professional wrestler. He is currently wrestles for Boca Raton Championship Wrestling (BRCW) and Pro Wrestling Noah. Rogers has made appearances for All Elite Wrestling (AEW), Ring of Honor (ROH), AAW, House of Hardcore, Combat Zone Wrestling (CZW), and Premiere Wrestling Xperience. He is best known for his time in Evolve and WWE, where he performed under the ring name Stallion Rogers on the NXT brand.

== Early life ==
Camron Rogers was born and raised in Crane, Texas, he first found training in Odessa, Texas, under Jastin Taylor after he attended San Antonio College in pursuit of a teaching degree. He later moved to St. Louis, Missouri in January 2015 to train under Michael Elgin.

== Professional wrestling career ==
In 2018, Stallion wrestled at Commonwealth Cup promoted by NOVA Pro Wrestling, but was defeated by Tracy Williams in the first match.

=== Evolve (2018–2020) ===
Stallion joined the Evolve promotion in 2018 and a year later, he became a full-time member of their roster. He made his first televised debut at Evolve 117 on December 15, 2018, where he was defeated by AR Fox in a singles match. At Evolve 118, Stallion defeated Anthony Greene, Bshp King and Colby Corino in a four-way freestyle. At Evolve 145, Mansoor defeated Stallion in the main event. During the 10th Anniversary Celebration of Evolve, Matt Riddle along with Stallion defeated Drew Gulak in a singles match. He wrestled several matches in Evolve until it went defunct and Rogers was signed to NXT in a developmental deal later in 2020.

=== WWE (2020–2021) ===
On October 23, 2020, Rogers signed with WWE. He made his televised debut as early as the October 16 episode of 205 Live, where he won a gauntlet match defeating Ariya Daivari by disqualification. Two weeks later on the October 30 episode of 205 Live, Stallion defeated Daivari in a rematch. On the November 6 episode of 205 Live, Stallion teamed with fellow recruit August Grey in a tag match, won by Daivari and Tony Nese. Stallion competed for the NXT Cruiserweight Championship on the February 3 episode of NXT. He also competed in the 2021 Dusty Rhodes Tag Team Classic with Grey. He wrestled his final match on the March 12 episode of 205 Live, teaming with Mansoor in a tag match defeating The Bollywood Boyz. Rogers was released by WWE along with Grey, Marina Shafir and Arturo Ruas on June 25, 2021 . He also suffered a wrist injury while training, 2 weeks before he was released.

=== Independent circuit (2021–present) ===
Rogers made his in-ring return on July 30 at VIP Wrestling's It Takes Two in a match against Shane Taylor. During the summer of 2021, he wrestled in events for Atlanta Wrestling Entertainment, Glory Pro Wrestling, Game Changer Wrestling and Black Label Pro. At AAW's Destination Chicago pay-per-view event, Stallion won the AAW Tag Team Championship with Jake Something after defeating InFAMy. On September 4, at Black Label Pro's Ground Control To Filthy Tom, Stallion wrestled in a title match against Something for the BLP Heavyweight Championship.

Stallion made his debut at Boca Raton Championship Wrestling on March 12, 2023. The event, March Madhouse was held at Mizner Park, where he wrestled with Kerry Morton. Madman Fulton defeated Stallion for BRCW Title on CCW's Conquer Kissimmee 18 event.

=== Pro Wrestling Noah (2022–present) ===
Stallion made his debut in Pro Wrestling Noah at NOAH Sunny Voyage 2022 on July 10, where he was defeated by Anthony Greene.

== Championships and accomplishments ==
- AAW: Professional Wrestling Redefined
  - AAW Tag Team Championship (1 time) – with Jake Something
- Anarchy Championship Wrestling
  - ACW Unified Championship (1 time)
- Anarchy Wrestling
  - Anarchy Landmark Heritage Championship (1 time)
- Boca Raton Championship Wrestling
  - BRCW Tag Team Championship (1 time) – with Matt Riddle
- Coastal Championship Wrestling
  - CCW Tag Team Championship (2 times) – with Danny Briggs (1) and Matt Riddle (1)
- Glory Pro Wrestling
  - Crown of Glory Championship (1 time)
- Old School Wrestling
  - OSW West Texas Championship (1 time)
  - OSW Light Heavyweight Championship (2 times)
- Proving Ground Pro
  - PGP Cutting Edge Championship (1 time)
- Pro Wrestling Legacy
  - PWL World Championship (1 time)
- Scenic City Invitational
  - Scenic City Trios Tournament (2017) – with Gary Jay and Myron Reed
- Pro Wrestling Illustrated
  - Ranked #476 in PWI 500 Singles wrestlers (2017)
- Ring of Honor
  - 2017 Top Prospect Tournament Semifinalist
- Southern Underground Pro
  - SUP Bonestorm Championship (1 time, inaugural)
  - SUP Bonestorm Title Tournament (2017)
- Evolve wrestling promotion
  - Evolution's Edge Tournament Winner (2019)
- Impact Pro Wrestling
  - Hall of Fame Classic Tournament (2019)
