= Németh =

- Language: Hungarian

Origin
- Meaning: "German"
- Region of origin: Hungary

Other names
- Variant forms: Nemeth, Német, Nemath, Namath, Nemet

Németh (Hungarian: [ˈneːmɛt]) is a Hungarian surname. In Hungarian, német means "German" (it is a variation of the word "néma", meaning "does not speak"; often used to describe the condition of being "mute". In this context, the German-speaking person "does not speak" the local language of Hungarian, or alternatively/previously/simultaneously, Slavic, as the word is thought to derive from a Slavic language); the h is a remnant of obsolete Hungarian spelling, as frequently found in names, especially in families of noble origin. Alternate spellings include "Nemeth", "Neimeth", "Német", "Nemath", "Namath", "Nameth", "Nemet". Notable people with the name or its variants include:

== People ==
Németh

- Ágnes Németh (born 1961), Hungarian basketball player
- András Németh (disambiguation), several people
- Angéla Németh (1946–2014), Hungarian track and field athlete
- Anikó Németh (born 1996), Hungarian ice hockey goaltender
- Antal Németh (born 1974), Hungarian football coach
- Balázs Németh (born 1988), Hungarian motorcycle racer
- Bernadett Németh (born 1996), Hungarian ice hockey player
- Dániel Németh (disambiguation), several people
- Dezső Németh (born 1975), Hungarian psychologist and cognitive neuroscientist
- Diána Németh (born 2004), Hungarian footballer
- Enikő Németh (born 1978), Hungarian sailor
- Enikő Németh T. (born 1964), Hungarian linguist
- Erzsébet Gy. Németh (born 1962), Hungarian politician
- Ferenc Németh (disambiguation), several people
- Gábor Németh (born 1975), Hungarian footballer
- Gyula Németh (disambiguation), several people
- Hanna Németh (born 1998), Hungarian footballer
- Helga Németh (born 1973), Hungarian handball player
- Hunor Németh (born 2007), Hungarian footballer
- Imre Németh (1917–1989), Hungarian athlete, mainly hammer throw
- István Németh (born 1979), Hungarian retired basketball player
- István Péter Németh (born 1960), Hungarian poet and literary historian
- János Németh (disambiguation), several people
- Jenő Németh (1902–?), Hungarian wrestler
- John Németh (born 1975), American blues and soul harmonicist, singer, and songwriter
- Júlia Németh (born 1991), Hungarian football goalkeeper
- Károly Németh (disambiguation), several people
- Kristóf Németh (born 1987), Hungarian hammer thrower
- Krisztián Németh (born 1989), Hungarian footballer
- Krisztián Németh (Slovak footballer) (born 1975)
- Lajos Németh (1944–2014), Hungarian football referee
- László Németh (disambiguation), several people
- Loretta Németh (born 1995), Hungarian footballer
- Márió Németh (born 1995), Hungarian footballer
- Miklós Németh (disambiguation), several people
- Milán Németh (born 1988), Hungarian footballer
- Nándor Németh (born 1999), Hungarian swimmer
- Noémi Németh (born 1986), Hungarian hammer thrower
- Norbert Németh (disambiguation), several people
- Pál Németh (1937–2009) Hungarian athlete and coach for hammer throw, father of Zsolt
- Peter Németh (born 1972), Slovak football player and manager
- Roland Németh (born 1974), Hungarian runner
- Sándor Németh (1925–1993), Hungarian swimmer
- Sándor Németh (wrestler) (born 1957), Hungarian wrestler
- Tamás Németh (born 1981), Hungarian footballer
- Szilárd Németh (disambiguation), several people
- Viktor Németh (born 1977), Hungarian footballer
- Virág Németh (born 1985), Hungarian tennis player
- Zoltán Németh (born 1972), Hungarian teacher and politician
- Zsanett Németh (1994–2026), Hungarian wrestler
- Zsolt Németh (disambiguation), several people
- Zsuzsanna Németh (born 1953), Hungarian politician

Nemeth

- Abraham Nemeth (1918–2013), American mathematician and inventor
- Charles Nemeth (born 1951), American philosopher and legal scholar
- Christopher Nemeth (1959–2010), British fashion designer
- David Nemeth (born 2001), Austrian footballer
- Elisabeth Nemeth (born 1951), Austrian philosopher
- Elizabeta Nemeth, American physiologist
- E. J. Nemeth (born 1983), American football quarterback
- Evi Nemeth (1940–2013), American engineer, author and teacher
- George Nemeth (1933–2009), Hungarian Canadian psychologist, avant-garde trend poet and writer
- Maria Nemeth (1897–1967), Hungarian dramatic coloratura soprano
- Nick Nemeth (born 1980), American wrestler better known as Dolph Ziggler
- Patrik Nemeth (born 1992) Swedish ice hockey player
- Peter Nemeth, American politician and judge
- Robert Nemeth (1958–2015), Austrian middle- and long-distance runner
- Ryan Nemeth (born 1984), American wrestler, writer, actor, and comedian
- Steve Nemeth (born 1967), Canadian ice hockey player
- Steve Nemeth (gridiron football) (1922–1998), American football player
- Tom Nemeth (born 1971), Canadian ice hockey defenseman

Namath

- Joe Namath (born 1943), American football player

Német/Nemet

- Istvan Nemet (1942–2015), New Zealand footballer
- Ivan Nemet (1943–2007), Serbian-born Croat-Swiss chess grandmaster
- László Német (born 1956), Serbian Catholic archbishop
- Klaus-Peter Nemet (born 1953), German football coach
- Marina Nemet (1960–2010), Croatian actress
- Tena Nemet Brankov (born 1994), Croatian actress
