= List of TNA World Tag Team Champions =

Listing of professional wrestling champions for the TNA World Tag Team Championship

The TNA World Tag Team Championship is a professional wrestling championship contested for in Total Nonstop Action Wrestling's (TNA) tag team division. After the formation of TNA in June 2002, the company executives signed a contractual agreement with the National Wrestling Alliance (NWA) that allowed them control of the NWA World Heavyweight and World Tag Team Championships. TNA subsequently changed their name to NWA–TNA, making them an official member of the NWA in the process. In May 2007, the NWA ended their five-year partnership with TNA, and thus regained control of the NWA World Heavyweight and World Tag Team Championships. As a result, TNA created the TNA World Heavyweight and World Tag Team Championships, which were unveiled on TNA's online podcast TNA Today on the May 15 and May 17, 2007, editions. In the respective editions, the championships were awarded to the last NWA champions under TNA banner by Jeremy Borash and TNA's primary authority figure Jim Cornette. The championship was officially presented to the public and awarded to the first official champions, Team 3D (Brother Devon and Brother Ray), on May 17. The championship was renamed to its original names in January 2024 when the promotion returned to the TNA banner.

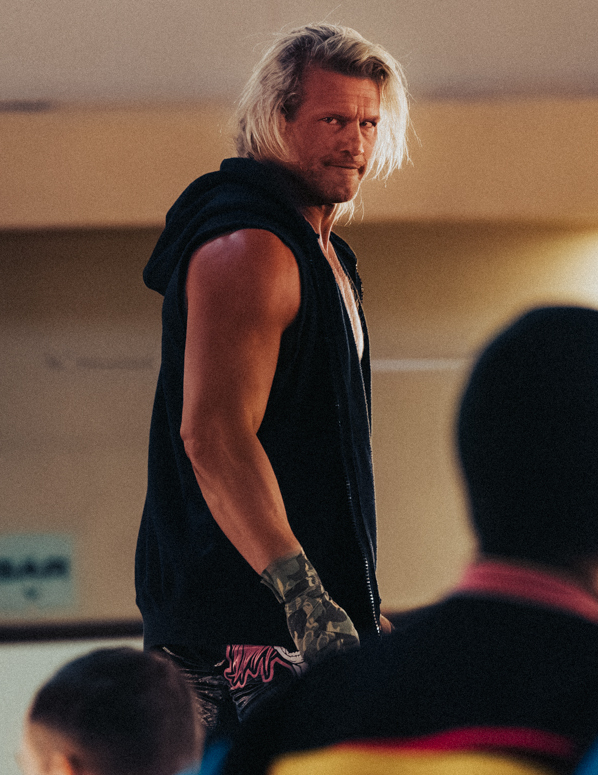
Current and two-time champions The Nemeths (Nic Nemeth and Ryan Nemeth (not pictured))

Title reigns are determined either by professional wrestling matches between different wrestlers involved in pre-existing scripted feuds, plots, and storylines, or by scripted circumstances. Wrestlers were portrayed as either villains or heroes as they followed a series of tension-building events, which culminated in a wrestling match or series of matches for the championship. Reigns that were won on episodes of TNA's primary television program, TNA Impact!, aired on television two to nine days from the date the match was taped. The inaugural champions were Team 3D, who were awarded the championship by being the last NWA World Tag Team Champions under TNA banner. The Wolves (Davey Richards and Eddie Edwards), Beer Money, Inc. (Bobby Roode and James Storm) and Hardys/Broken Hardys (Matt Hardy/Broken Matt and Jeff Hardy/Brother Nero) hold the record for most reigns as a team, with five. The longest reign is the first reign of The North (Ethan Page and Josh Alexander), who held the titles for 380 days.

Although the title is a World Tag Team Championship, supposedly only intended for tag teams, three different wrestlers have held the championship by themselves—Samoa Joe, Kurt Angle and Matt Morgan. Joe held the championship during his entire reign alone; however, Angle held the championship alone for 15 days until Sting won a match involving three other competitors to become Angle's partner and Morgan held the championship after (kayfabe) injuring his championship partner. Overall, there have been 75 reigns shared between 74 wrestlers and 47 teams. The Nemeths (Nic Nemeth and Ryan Nemeth) are the current champions in their second reign as a team and individually. They won the title by defeating The Hardys (Matt Hardy and Jeff Hardy) in a Steel Cage tornado tag team match at Lockdown on August 23, 2026, in Chicago, Illinois.

== Title history ==
=== Names ===
Name	Years
TNA World Tag Team Championship	May 13, 2007 – March 1, 2017; January 13, 2024 – present
Impact Wrestling World Tag Team Championship	March 2, 2017 – July 2, 2017
Unified GFW World Tag Team Championship	July 2, 2017 – August 17, 2017
GFW World Tag Team Championship	August 17, 2017 – September 18, 2017
Impact World Tag Team Championship	September 18, 2017 – January 13, 2024

=== Reigns ===
For a list of world tag team champions in TNA between 2002 and 2007, see List of NWA World Tag Team Champions.

As of November 12, 2026.

Key
No.	Overall reign number
Reign	Reign number for the specific team—reign numbers for the individuals are in parentheses, if different
Days	Number of days held
+	Current reign is changing daily

No.	Champion	Championship change			Reign statistics		Notes	Ref.
No.	Champion	Date	Event	Location	Reign	Days	Notes	Ref.
Total Nonstop Action Wrestling (TNA)
1	Team 3D (Brother Devon and Brother Ray)	May 17, 2007	TNA Today	Orlando, FL	1	59	After the National Wrestling Alliance stripped Team 3D of the NWA World Tag Team Championship on May 13, they were awarded the TNA World Tag Team Championship by Jim Cornette and Jeremy Borash.	
2	Samoa Joe	July 15, 2007	Victory Road	Orlando, FL	1	28	TNA X Division Champion Joe teamed with TNA World Heavyweight Champion Kurt Angle, where the wrestler to get the fall would win that wrestler's title. Joe pinned Brother Ray to win the TNA World Tag Team Championship; he decided to hold the title alone.	
3	Kurt Angle	August 12, 2007	Hard Justice	Orlando, FL	1	15	This was a Winner Takes All match, where Joe's TNA X Division and World Tag Team Championships and Angle's TNA World Heavyweight and (IGF-recognized) IWGP Heavyweight Championship were at stake.	
4	Kurt Angle and Sting (Note: Sting joined Angle in the middle of his reign. Sting's reign began on August 27, 2007 and lasted until they lost the titles on September 9. As a team, their reign began on August 27.)	August 27, 2007	Impact!	Orlando, FL	1	13	Sting defeated A.J. Styles, Christian Cage, and Samoa Joe in a Four-way match to become Angle's partner. Aired on tape delay on August 30.	
5	Team Pacman (Adam Jones and Ron Killings)	September 9, 2007	No Surrender	Orlando, FL	1	35		
6	Christian's Coalition (A.J. Styles and Tomko)	October 14, 2007	Bound for Glory	Duluth, GA	1	184	Defeated Ron Killings and Consequences Creed, who defended the title on Adam Jones' behalf.	
7	Kaz and Eric Young/Super Eric	April 15, 2008	Impact!	Orlando, FL	1	<1	This three-way match also featured The Latin American Xchange.	
—	Vacated	April 15, 2008	Impact!	Orlando, FL	—	—	Kaz and Eric Young were stripped of the title by Jim Cornette after Young refused to admit that he and Super Eric were the same person. Aired on tape delay on April 17.	
8	The Latin American Xchange (Hernandez and Homicide)	May 11, 2008	Sacrifice	Orlando, FL	1	91	Defeated Team 3D in the The Deuces Wild Tag Team Tournament final to win the vacant title.	
9	Beer Money, Inc. (James Storm and Bobby Roode)	August 10, 2008	Hard Justice	Trenton, NJ	1	128		
10	Jay Lethal and Consequences Creed	December 16, 2008	Impact!	Orlando, FL	1	26	This was Lethal's Feast or Fired tag team title opportunity. Aired on tape delay on January 8.	
11	Beer Money, Inc. (James Storm and Bobby Roode)	January 11, 2009	Genesis	Charlotte, NC	2	98	This three-way match also featured Abyss and Matt Morgan.	
12	Team 3D (Brother Devon and Brother Ray)	April 19, 2009	Lockdown	Philadelphia, PA	2	63	This was a Philadelphia Street Fight with the IWGP Tag Team Championship also at stake.	
13	Beer Money, Inc. (James Storm and Bobby Roode)	June 21, 2009	Slammiversary	Auburn Hills, MI	3	28		
14	Main Event Mafia (Booker T and Scott Steiner)	July 19, 2009	Victory Road	Orlando, FL	1	91		
15	The British Invasion (Brutus Magnus and Doug Williams)	October 18, 2009	Bound for Glory	Irvine, CA	1	91	This four-way Full Metal Mayhem tag team match also featured Beer Money, Inc. and Team 3D. The IWGP Tag Team Championship was also at stake and won by Team 3D.	
16	Hernandez and Matt Morgan	January 17, 2010	Genesis	Orlando, FL	1 (2, 1)	107	Morgan declared himself sole champion after injuring Hernandez in kayfabe and putting him out of action indefinitely with Morgan defending the title alone.	
17	The Band (Eric Young, Kevin Nash and Scott Hall)	May 4, 2010	Impact!	Orlando, FL	1 (2, 1, 1)	41	This was Nash's Feast or Fired tag team title opportunity. Aired on tape delay on May 13. Nash and Hall won the title, while Young was recognized as a champion; the trio defended the title under the Freebird Rule.	
—	Vacated	June 14, 2010	Impact!	Orlando, FL	—	—	The Band was stripped of the title due to Scott Hall's legal problems. Aired on tape delay on June 17.	
18	Motor City Machine Guns (Alex Shelley and Chris Sabin)	July 11, 2010	Victory Road	Orlando, FL	1	182	Defeated Beer Money, Inc. (James Storm and Robert Roode) to win the vacant title.	
19	Beer Money, Inc. (James Storm and Robert/Bobby Roode)	January 9, 2011	Genesis	Orlando, FL	4	212	Robert Roode switched his ring name to Bobby Roode in May 2011. On the May 3 tapings of Impact, TNA announced the rebrand as Impact Wrestling (aired on tape delay on May 12).	
Impact Wrestling
20	Mexican America (Anarquia and Hernandez)	August 9, 2011	Impact	Orlando, FL	1 (1, 3)	97	Aired on tape delay on August 18.	
21	Crimson and Matt Morgan	November 14, 2011	Impact	Orlando, FL	1 (1, 2)	90	Aired on tape delay on November 17.	
22	Magnus and Samoa Joe	February 12, 2012	Against All Odds	Orlando, FL	1 (2, 2)	91		
23	Christopher Daniels and Kazarian	May 13, 2012	Sacrifice	Orlando, FL	1 (1, 2)	28		
24	A.J. Styles and Kurt Angle	June 10, 2012	Slammiversary X	Arlington, TX	1 (2, 2)	18		
25	Christopher Daniels and Kazarian	June 28, 2012	Impact	Orlando, FL	2 (2, 3)	108		
26	Chavo Guerrero Jr. and Hernandez	October 14, 2012	Bound for Glory	Phoenix, AZ	1 (1, 4)	103	This three-way tag team match also featured the team of AJ Styles and Kurt Angle.	
27	Bobby Roode and Austin Aries	January 25, 2013	Impact	Manchester, England	1 (5, 1)	76	Aired on tape delay on February 7.	
28	Chavo Guerrero Jr. and Hernandez	April 11, 2013	Impact	Corpus Christi, TX	2 (2, 5)	52	This was a 2-out-of-3 falls match. Had Guerrero and Hernandez lost, they would have vowed never to team together again.	
29	Gunner and James Storm	June 2, 2013	Slammiversary XI	Boston, MA	1 (1, 5)	140	This four-way tag team elimination match also featured the team of Austin Aries and Bobby Roode and Bad Influence (Christopher Daniels and Kazarian).	
30	The BroMans (Robbie E and Jessie Godderz)	October 20, 2013	Bound for Glory	San Diego, CA	1	126		
31	Wolves (Davey Richards and Eddie Edwards)	February 23, 2014	House show	Morgantown, WV	1	7		
32	The BroMans (Robbie E and Jessie Godderz)	March 2, 2014	Kaisen: Outbreak	Tokyo, Japan	2	56	This three-way tag team match also featured Team 246 (Kaz Hayashi and Shuji Kondo).	
33	Wolves (Davey Richards and Eddie Edwards)	April 27, 2014	Sacrifice	Orlando, FL	2	145	This was a 2-on-3 handicap No Disqualification match with DJZ as the third member of The BroMans.	
34	The Revolution (Abyss and James Storm)	September 19, 2014	Impact	Bethlehem, PA	1 (1, 6)	133	This was Storm's Feast or Fired tag team title opportunity, given to him by Gunner. Aired on tape delay on November 12.	
35	Wolves (Davey Richards and Eddie Edwards)	January 30, 2015	Impact	Manchester, England	3	42	Aired on tape delay on March 6.	
—	Vacated	March 13, 2015	Impact	Orlando, FL	—	—	The title was vacated due to Eddie Edwards suffering a broken heel. Aired on tape delay on April 3.	
36	The Hardys (Jeff Hardy and Matt Hardy)	March 16, 2015	Impact	Orlando, FL	1	53	Defeated the Beat Down Clan (Low Ki and Kenny King), Bram and Ethan Carter III, and Dirty Heels (Austin Aries and Bobby Roode) in an Ultimate X match to win the vacant title. Aired on tape delay on April 17.	
—	Vacated	May 8, 2015	Impact	Orlando, FL	—	—	The title was vacated due to Jeff Hardy suffering a broken leg.	
37	Wolves (Davey Richards and Eddie Edwards)	June 25, 2015	Impact	Orlando, FL	4	33	Defeated The Dirty Heels (Austin Aries and Bobby Roode) in a 30-minute Iron Man match to win the vacant title; this was the fifth match in a best-of-five series. Aired on tape delay on July 1.	
38	Brian Myers and Trevor Lee	July 28, 2015	Impact	Orlando, FL	1	1	This was Magnus's Feast or Fired tag team title opportunity that was invoked by Jeff and Karen Jarrett. Aired on tape delay on September 2.	
39	Wolves (Davey Richards and Eddie Edwards)	July 29, 2015	Impact	Orlando, FL	5	186	Aired on tape delay September 9.	
40	Beer Money, Inc. (Bobby Roode and James Storm)	January 31, 2016	Impact	Birmingham, England	5 (6, 7)	48	This was Storm's Feast or Fired tag team title opportunity. Aired on tape delay on March 8.	
41	Decay (Abyss and Crazzy Steve)	March 19, 2016	Impact! Sacrifice	Orlando, FL	1 (2, 1)	197	This was a Valley of Shadows match. Aired on tape delay on April 26.	
42	The Broken Hardys (Broken Matt and Brother Nero)	October 2, 2016	Bound for Glory	Orlando, FL	2	152	This was The Great War. The team was previously known as The Hardys, and Brother Nero and Broken Matt were previously known as Jeff Hardy and Matt Hardy, respectively. On March 2, the title was renamed the "Impact Wrestling World Tag Team Championship", following the promotion's renaming.	
—	Vacated	March 3, 2017	Impact	Orlando, FL	—	—	The title was vacated after The Broken Hardys left TNA. Aired on tape delay on March 16.	
43	The Latin American Xchange (Ortiz and Santana)	March 4, 2017	Impact	Orlando, FL	1	169	This four-way tag team match also featured Decay, Reno Scum (Adam Thornstowe and Luster the Legend), and the team of Laredo Kid and Garza Jr.. Aired on tape delay March 30. They later won and unified the GFW Tag Team Championship with the Impact Wrestling World Tag Team Championship; the title was renamed the "GFW World Tag Team Championship".	
Global Force Wrestling (GFW)
44	Ohio Versus Everything (Dave Crist and Jake Crist)	August 20, 2017	Impact! Victory Road	Orlando, FL	1	81	Aired on tape delay on September 28. The title was later renamed the "Impact World Tag Team Championship".	
Impact Wrestling
45	The Latin American Xchange (Ortiz and Santana)	November 9, 2017	Impact!	Ottawa, Ontario, Canada	2	164	Aired on tape delay on January 4.	
46	Eli Drake and Scott Steiner	April 22, 2018	Redemption	Orlando, FL	1 (1, 2)	2	This was Drake's Feast or Fired tag team title opportunity.	
47	Z&E (Andrew Everett and DJZ)	April 24, 2018	Impact!	Orlando, FL	1	2	Aired on tape delay on May 17.	
48	The Latin American Xchange (Ortiz and Santana)	April 26, 2018	Impact!	Orlando, FL	3	261	Aired on tape delay on June 21.	
49	The Lucha Bros. (Fenix and Pentagon Jr.)	January 12, 2019	Impact!	Mexico City, Mexico	1	106	Aired on tape delay on February 8.	
50	The Latin American Xchange (Ortiz and Santana)	April 28, 2019	Rebellion	Toronto, Ontario, Canada	4	68	This was a Full Metal Mayhem match.	
51	The North (Ethan Page and Josh Alexander)	July 5, 2019	Bash at the Brewery	San Antonio, TX	1	380		
52	Motor City Machine Guns (Alex Shelley and Chris Sabin)	July 19, 2020	Impact!	Nashville, TN	2	97	Aired on tape delay on July 21.	
53	The North (Ethan Page and Josh Alexander)	October 24, 2020	Bound for Glory	Nashville, TN	2	21	This four-way tag team match also featured Ace Austin and Madman Fulton and The Good Brothers (Doc Gallows and Karl Anderson).	
54	The Good Brothers (Doc Gallows and Karl Anderson)	November 14, 2020	Turning Point	Nashville, TN	1	119		
55	FinJuice (David Finlay and Juice Robinson)	March 13, 2021	Sacrifice	Nashville, TN	1	65	Impact recognizes this reign as beginning on March 13, 2021, when the special aired on tape delay. The actual date the match took place is unknown, as FinJuice also appeared live at New Japan Cup the same night.	
56	Violent By Design (Eric Young, Rhino, Joe Doering, and Deaner)	May 17, 2021	Impact!	Nashville, TN	1 (3, 1, 1, 1)	61	This was Rhino's Call Your Shot Gauntlet title opportunity; Rhino and Doering won the title. Aired on tape delay on May 20. Young and Deaner were also recognized as champions via the Freebird Rule.	
57	The Good Brothers (Doc Gallows and Karl Anderson)	July 17, 2021	Slammiversary	Nashville, TN	2	231	This four-way tag team match also featured Rich Swann and Willie Mack and Fallah Bahh and No Way. Joe Doering and Rhino represented Violent By Design.	
58	Violent By Design (Eric Young, Joe Doering, and Deaner)	March 5, 2022	Sacrifice	Louisville, KY	2 (4, 2, 2)	63	Doering and Young won the title, while Deaner was also recognized as a champion via the Freebird Rule.	
59	The Briscoes (Jay Briscoe and Mark Briscoe)	May 7, 2022	Under Siege	Newport, KY	1	43	Eric Young and Deaner represented Violent By Design.	
60	The Good Brothers (Doc Gallows and Karl Anderson)	June 19, 2022	Slammiversary	Nashville, TN	3	68		
61	The Kingdom (Mike Bennett and Matt Taven)	August 26, 2022	Impact!	Dallas, TX	1	43	Aired on tape delay on September 1.	
62	Heath and Rhino	October 8, 2022	Impact!	Albany, NY	1 (1, 2)	62	Aired on tape delay on October 20.	
63	Motor City Machine Guns (Alex Shelley and Chris Sabin)	December 9, 2022	Impact!	Pembroke Pines, FL	3	78	Aired on tape delay on December 15.	
64	ABC (Note: Originally won the titles under the team name "Ace Austin and Chris Bey") (Ace Austin and Chris Bey)	February 25, 2023	Impact!	Sunrise Manor, NV	1	140	Aired on tape delay on March 2.	
65	Subculture (Mark Andrews and Flash Morgan Webster)	July 15, 2023	Slammiversary	Windsor, Ontario, Canada	1	43	This four-way tag team match also featured Rich Swann and Sami Callihan and Brian Myers and Moose.	
66	The Rascalz (Trey Miguel and Zachary Wentz)	August 27, 2023	Emergence	Toronto, Ontario, Canada	1	55		
67	ABC (Ace Austin and Chris Bey)	October 21, 2023	Bound for Glory	Cicero, IL	2	139	This was Bey's Feast or Fired tag team title opportunity. The company later reverted to Total Nonstop Action Wrestling.	
Total Nonstop Action Wrestling (TNA)
68	The System (Brian Myers and Eddie Edwards)	March 8, 2024	Sacrifice	Windsor, Ontario, Canada	1 (2, 6)	134		
69	ABC (Ace Austin and Chris Bey)	July 20, 2024	Slammiversary	Montreal, Quebec, Canada	3	55		
70	The System (Brian Myers and Eddie Edwards)	September 13, 2024	Victory Road	San Antonio, TX	2 (3, 7)	43		
71	The Hardys (Matt Hardy and Jeff Hardy)	October 26, 2024	Bound for Glory	Detroit, MI	3	183	This Three-way Full Metal Mayhem match also featured ABC (Ace Austin and Chris Bey).	
72	The Nemeths (Nic Nemeth and Ryan Nemeth)	April 27, 2025	Rebellion	Los Angeles, CA	1	84		
73	The Hardys (Matt Hardy and Jeff Hardy)	July 20, 2025	Slammiversary	Elmont, NY	4	265	This four-way tag team ladder match also featured The Rascalz (Myron Reed and Zachary Wentz) and Fir$t Cla$$ (A. J. Francis and KC Navarro).	
74	The System (Brian Myers and Bear Bronson)	April 11, 2026	Rebellion	Cleveland, OH	1 (4, 1)	78		
75	The Broken Hardys/The Hardys (Broken Matt/Matt Hardy and Brother Nero/Jeff Hardy)	June 28, 2026	Slammiversary	Boston, MA	5	56	This four-way ladder match also featured The Righteous (Vincent and Dutch) and The Great Hands (John Skyler and Jason Hotch). Won the title under the name The Broken Hardys (Broken Matt and Brother Nero); name reverted back to The Hardys (Matt Hardy and Jeff Hardy).	
76	The Nemeths (Nic Nemeth and Ryan Nemeth)	August 23, 2026	Lockdown	Chicago, IL	2	81+	This was a Steel Cage tornado tag team match.	

== Combined reigns ==
As of November 12, 2026.

†	Indicates the current champion

=== By team ===
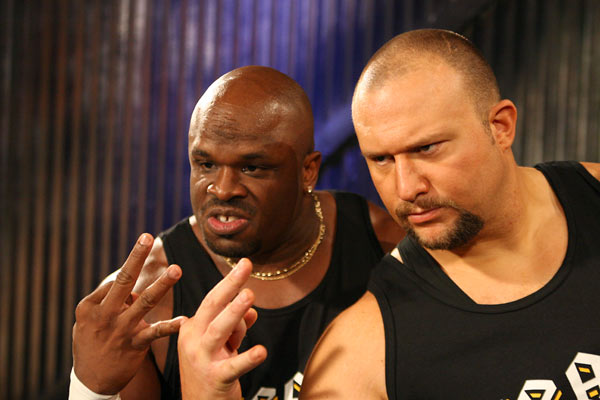
Inaugural and two-time champions Team 3D (Brother Ray and Brother Devon)

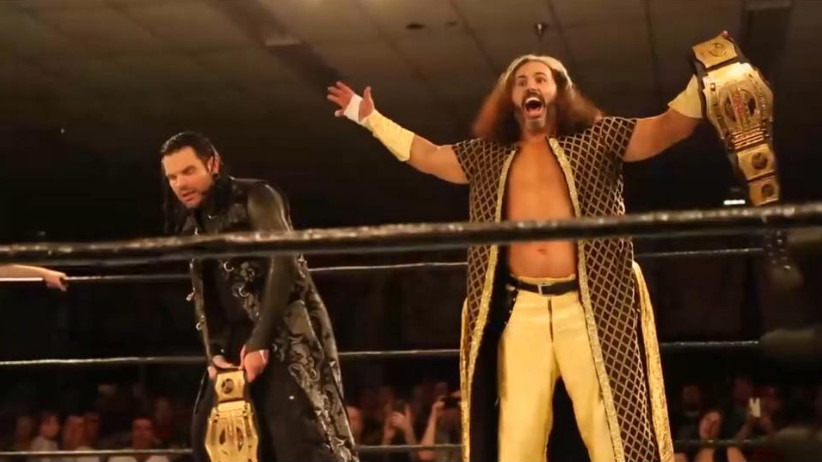
Record-tying five-time champions The Hardys (Matt Hardy (right) and Jeff Hardy (left)) hold the record for the most combined days as champions.

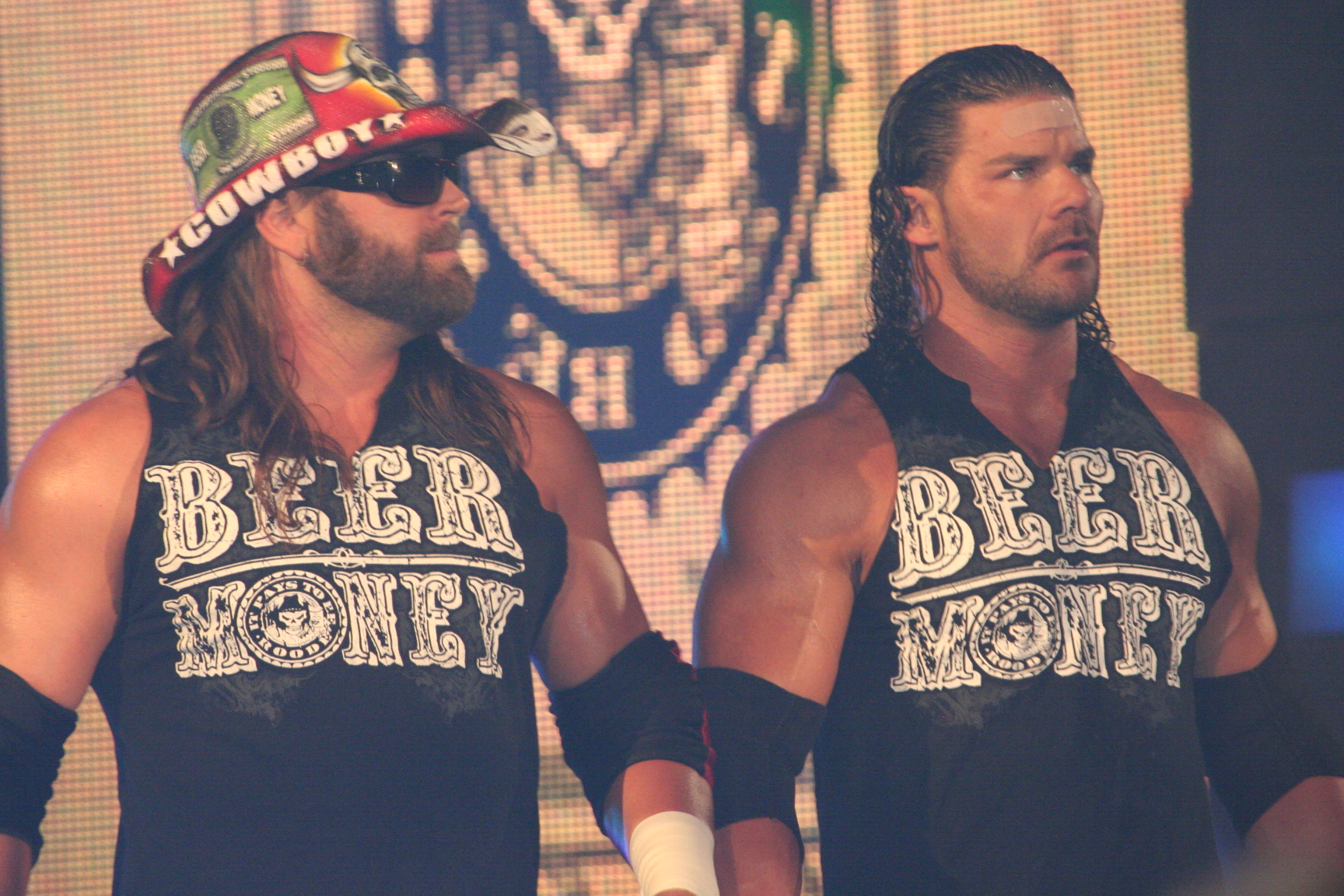
Record tying five-time champions Beer Money, Inc.

Rank	Team	No. of reigns	Combined days
1	The Hardys/The Broken Hardys (Jeff Hardy/Brother Nero and Matt Hardy/Broken Matt)	5	709
2	The Latin American Xchange (Ortiz and Santana)	4	662
3	Beer Money, Inc. (Robert/Bobby Roode and James Storm)	5	514
4	The Good Brothers (Doc Gallows and Karl Anderson)	3	418
5	Wolves (Davey Richards and Eddie Edwards)	5	413
6	The North (Ethan Page and Josh Alexander)	2	401
7	Motor City Machine Guns (Alex Shelley and Chris Sabin)	3	357
8	ABC (Ace Austin and Chris Bey)	3	334
9	Decay (Abyss and Crazzy Steve)	1	197
10	Christian's Coalition (AJ Styles and Tomko)	1	184
11	The BroMans (Robbie E and Jessie Godderz)	2	182
12	The System (Brian Myers and Eddie Edwards)	2	176
13	The Nemeths † (Nic Nemeth and Ryan Nemeth)	2	165+
14	Chavo Guerrero Jr. and Hernandez	2	155
15	Gunner and James Storm	1	140
16	Bad Influence (Christopher Daniels and Kazarian)	2	136
17	The Revolution (Abyss and James Storm)	1	133
18	Violent By Design (Reigns 1: Eric Young, Rhino, Joe Doering, and Deaner) (Reign 2: Eric Young, Joe Doering, and Deaner)	2	124
19	Team 3D (Brother Devon and Brother Ray)	2	122
20	Hernandez and Matt Morgan	1	107
21	The Lucha Brothers (Fenix and Pentagon Jr.)	1	106
22	Mexican America (Anarquia and Hernandez)	1	97
23	The British Invasion (Brutus Magnus and Doug Williams)	1	91
23	The Latin American Xchange (Hernandez and Homicide)	1	91
23	Magnus and Samoa Joe	1	91
23	Main Event Mafia (Booker T and Scott Steiner)	1	91
27	Crimson and Matt Morgan	1	90
28	Ohio Versus Everything (Dave Crist and Jake Crist)	1	81
29	The System (Brian Myers and Bear Bronson)	1	78
30	Austin Aries and Bobby Roode	1	76
31	FinJuice (David Finlay and Juice Robinson)	1	65
32	Heath and Rhino	1	62
33	The Rascalz (Trey Miguel and Zachary Wentz)	1	55
34	Subculture (Mark Andrews and Flash Morgan Webster)	1	43
34	The Briscoes (Jay Briscoe and Mark Briscoe)	1	43
34	The Kingdom (Mike Bennett and Matt Taven)	1	43
37	The Band (Eric Young, Kevin Nash, and Scott Hall)	1	41
38	Team Pacman (Adam Jones and Ron Killings)	1	35
39	Samoa Joe	1	28
40	Consequences Creed and Jay Lethal	1	26
41	AJ Styles and Kurt Angle	1	18
42	Kurt Angle	1	15
43	Kurt Angle and Sting	1	13
44	Z&E (Andrew Everett and DJZ)	1	2
44	Eli Drake and Scott Steiner	1	2
46	Brian Myers and Trevor Lee	1	1
47	Kaz and Eric Young/Super Eric	1	<1

=== By wrestler ===
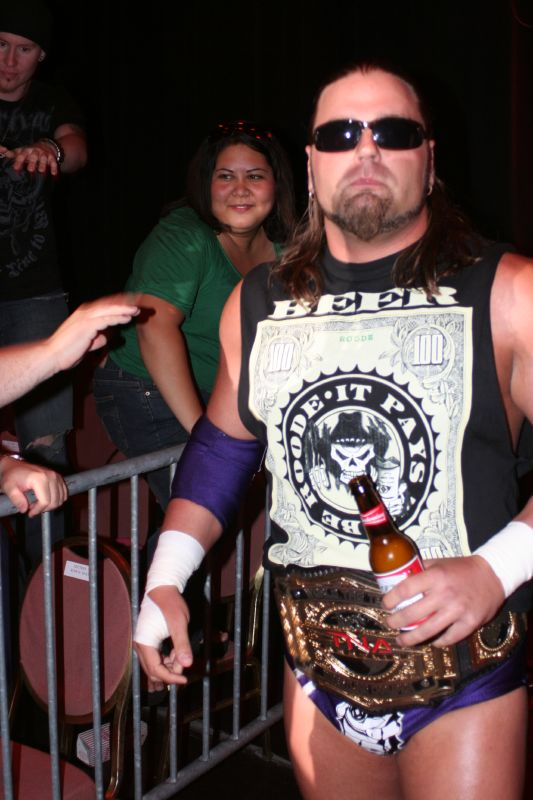
Record tying seven-time champion James Storm

Rank	Wrestler	No. of reigns	Combined days
1	James Storm	7	787
2	Jeff Hardy/Brother Nero	5	709
2	Matt Hardy/Broken Matt	5	709
4	Ortiz	4	662
4	Santana	4	662
6	Eddie Edwards	7	590
6	Robert/Bobby Roode	6	590
8	Hernandez	5	450
9	Doc Gallows	3	418
9	Karl Anderson	3	418
11	Davey Richards	5	413
12	Ethan Page	2	401
12	Josh Alexander	2	401
14	Alex Shelley	3	357
14	Chris Sabin	3	357
16	Ace Austin	3	334
16	Chris Bey	3	334
18	Abyss	2	330
19	Brian Myers	4	256
20	AJ Styles	2	202
21	Crazzy Steve	2	197
21	Matt Morgan	1	197
23	Tomko	1	184
24	Jessie Godderz	2	182
24	Magnus	2	182
24	Robbie E	2	182
27	Nic Nemeth †	2	165+
27	Ryan Nemeth †	2	165+
29	Eric Young/Super Eric	4	165
30	Chavo Guerrero	2	155
31	Gunner	1	140
32	Christopher Daniels	3	136
32	Kaz/Kazarian	2	136
34	Deaner	2	124
34	Joe Doering	2	124
36	Rhino	2	123
37	Brother Devon	2	122
37	Brother Ray	2	122
39	Samoa Joe	2	119
40	Fenix	1	106
40	Pentagon Jr.	1	106
42	Anarquia	1	97
43	Scott Steiner	2	93
44	Booker T	1	91
44	Doug Williams	1	91
44	Homicide	1	91
47	Crimson	1	90
48	Dave Crist	1	81
48	Jake Crist	1	81
50	Bear Bronson	1	78
51	Austin Aries	1	76
52	David Finlay	1	65
52	Juice Robinson	1	65
54	Heath	1	62
55	Trey Miguel	1	55
55	Zachary Wentz	1	55
57	Kurt Angle	2	46
58	Flash Morgan Webster	1	43
58	Mark Andrews	1	43
58	Jay Briscoe	1	43
58	Mark Briscoe	1	43
58	Matt Taven	1	43
58	Mike Bennett	1	43
64	Kevin Nash	1	41
64	Scott Hall	1	41
66	Adam Jones	1	35
66	Ron Killings	1	35
68	Consequences Creed	1	26
68	Jay Lethal	1	26
70	Sting	1	13
71	Andrew Everett	1	2
71	DJZ	1	2
71	Eli Drake	1	2
74	Trevor Lee	1	1

== See also ==
- List of current champions in TNA Wrestling
- Championships in TNA Wrestling
