= The System (professional wrestling) =

Professional wrestling stable

Stable
- Name: The System
- Leader: Eddie Edwards (II)
- Members: Brian Myers; Bear Bronson; Cedric Alexander
- Manager: Alisha Edwards
- Billed heights: Eddie: 6 ft 0 in (1.83 m); Myers: 6 ft 1 in (1.85 m); Bronson: 6 ft 2 in (1.88 m); Alexander: 5 ft 10 in (1.78 m); Alisha: 5 ft 0 in (1.52 m)
- Former members: Masha Slamovich; JDC; Moose (I)
- Debut: January 13, 2024
- Years active: 2024–present

The System is a professional wrestling stable that performs in Total Nonstop Action Wrestling (TNA). The group consists of second leader Eddie Edwards, Brian Myers, Bear Bronson, Cedric Alexander, and Alisha Edwards, who serves as the group’s manager.

As a stable, Moose, who was the original leader, is a former one-time TNA X Division Champion and a former TNA World Champion, Myers and Eddie are former two-time TNA World Tag Team Champions, Alisha is a former TNA Knockouts World Tag Team Champion alongside former member Masha Slamovich, Myers and Bronson are former one-time TNA World Tag Team Champions, and Alexander is a former one-time TNA X Division Champion.

== Background ==
On the June 15, 2023 episode of Impact!, Myers approached Moose to offer to team with him against Impact World Tag Team Champions ABC (Ace Austin and Chris Bey). On July 15, at Slammiversary, Myers and Moose was involved in the Impact World Tag Team Championship four-way tag team match, which was won by Subculture (Mark Andrews and Flash Morgan Webster). On the August 8 episode of Impact!, Myers unsuccessfully challenged for the Impact World Championship against Alex Shelley. On August 27, at Emergence, Myers teamed with Moose, Bully Ray and Lio Rush defeating Josh Alexander and Time Machine (Alex Shelley, Chris Sabin and Kushida). On December 9, at Final Resolution, Myers teamed up with Eddie Edwards to unsuccessfully challenge ABC for the Impact World Tag Team Championship.

== History ==
=== Moose's leadership (2024–2026) ===
On January 13, 2024, at the "Countdown to TNA Hard To Kill", Myers and Edwards defeated Eric Young and Frankie Kazarian pre-show. During a backstage interview at Hard To Kill, Edwards, Myers, Alisha Edwards, Moose and DeAngelo Williams would form a stable calling themselves "The System". The stable later accompanied Moose to his main event match for the TNA World Championship against Alex Shelley. During the match, Edwards and the rest of The System attempted to distract Shelley, prompting a brawl with Shelley's partners, Chris Sabin and Kushida. Moose later won the match, after which he was confronted by Nic Nemeth. On February 23, at the "Countdown to No Surrender", Myers and Edwards defeated Intergalactic Jet Setters (Kevin Knight and Kushida). On March 8, at Sacrifice, Myers and Edwards defeated ABC to win the TNA World Tag Team Championship, while Moose successfully defended his TNA world title against Eric Young. In April, The System encouraged Masha Slamovich to team up with Alisha Edwards to challenge Spitfire (Dani Luna and Jody Threat) for the TNA Knockouts World Tag Team Championship. On May 3 at Under Siege, Slamovich and Alisha defeated Spitfire to win the TNA Knockouts World Tag Team Championship. On June 14, at Against All Odds, Dirty Dango allied himself with The System after costing the Nemeth Brothers their tag team title shot against Myers and Edwards, after which he changed his name to Johnny "Dango" Curtis (JDC). On July 20 at Slammiversary, Edwards and Myers lost the TNA World Tag Team titles to ABC, while Moose lost the TNA World title in six-way elimination match to Nic Nemeth, he was eliminated second by Joe Hendry. On September 14 at Victory Road, The Malisha was defeated by Spitfire for the TNA Knockouts Tag Team Championship, After the match Alisha Edwards and Tasha Steelz turned on Slamovich and attacked her causing her to turn face, while Myers and Edwards defeated ABC to regain the TNA World Tag Team Championship. At the 2024 Bound for Glory pay-per-view, Eddie Edwards and Bryan Myers lost the TNA World Tag Team Championships to The Hardys in a Full Metal Mayhem match. This was a three-way tag team match that also involved ABC. On the November 7 episode of Impact, Moose won the TNA X Division Championship for the first time in his career. On November 29 at Turning Point, Moose successfully defended the X Division Championship against Laredo Kid. Myers competed in the Thanksgiving Turkey Bowl match, where he was pinned by Joe Hendry and per the stipulation, he was forced to wear a turkey suit. This match also involved Eric Young, Hammerstone, John Skyler, and Rhino, and Edwards unsuccessfully challenged Nic Nemeth for the TNA World Championship that night. Over a month later on the December 5 episode of Impact!, The System would invoke their rematch clause to challenge The Hardys for the titles, only for the match to end via disqualification due to Alisha Edwards interfering. The System continued to beat down The Hardys, ending when they put the champions through a table. As a result, TNA later announced that The Hardys and The System would face off once again for the TNA World Tag Team Championship at Final Resolution in a tables match. At the event, Edwards and Myers failed to regain the TNA World Tag Team Championships while Moose successfully retained his TNA X Division Championship against Kushida.

At Slammiversary on July 20, 2025, Moose lost the TNA X Division Championship to Leon Slater and endorsed Slater post-match, reestablishing Moose as a face for the first time since 2018. At the same event, Eddie, Myers and JDC teamed with Matt Cardona to defeat NXT stable DarkState (Dion Lennox, Cutler James, Osiris Griffin and Saquon Shugars), with Myers, Eddie and JDC working the match as babyfaces. At Emergence on August 15, Moose failed to win the TNA World Championship from Trick Williams, while Eddie and Myers failed to defeat Fir$t Cla$$ (A. J. Francis and Rich Swann). On the August 21 TNA Impact, Order 4 (Mustafa Ali and The Great Hands (John Skyler and Jason Hotch)) defeated Matt Cardona and The System's Moose and Myers due to assistance from Tasha Steelz and Agent 0, who wiped out Alisha Edwards and Eddie Edwards, respectively. After the match, Moose was restrained by Ali's Secret Service as Ali himself brandished a chair. JDC later ran out to try and stop him, but was beaten down by Agent 0, who slammed JDC onto the chair, rendering him out of action for several weeks. Ali would go on to declare war on The System, vowing to make Order 4 the ruling force in TNA. Three weeks later, Ali tried interfering in Moose's match with Francis, but accidentally struck Francis before being neutralized, allowing Moose to get the win. The following week, Ali defeated Myers in singles action, which eventually exploded into an all-out brawl between Order 4 and The System. Seeing enough, Santino Marella declared that the two factions would meet at Bound for Glory in Hardcore War. At Victory Road on September 26, Ali defeated Moose to get that advantage for Order 4 at Bound for Glory. At Bound for Glory on October 12, The System (Moose, Alisha, Eddie, Myers and JDC) defeated Order 4 (Ali, Steelz, Agent 0, Hotch and Skyler), thus solidifying the stable as the #1 faction in TNA. On the November 13 edition of Impact!, JDC announced that he would retire from in-ring competition at Genesis in 2026. On November 14 at Turning Point, The System lost to The Rascalz (Trey Miguel, Zachary Wentz, Myron Reed, and Dezmond Xavier).

On January 17 at Genesis, JDC competed in his final match of his career where he was defeated by Eddie Edwards.

=== Eddie Edwards' leadership (2026–present) ===
On the January 22, 2026 episode of Impact!, Eddie was able to secure a Feast or Fired briefcase, revealed to be a world title shot in the following week. In the main event segment, Bear Bronson and Cedric Alexander were introduced as the newest members of The System, with Eddie taking over leadership of the stable and also kicking out JDC and Moose, turning heel as a stable once again. On the January 29, 2026, episode of Impact!, Alisha Edwards decided to exit from the stable, after she refused to be part of the System anymore. Over the following weeks, each member of the System were defeated by Moose. On March 27 at Sacrifice, Eddie was defeated by Moose via disqualifaction after he was attacked by Special Agent 0 of the Order 4. Later in the night, Eddie attempted to attack the reigning TNA World Champion Mike Santana, but was fended off.

At Rebellion on April 11, Bronson and Myers defeated The Hardys (Matt Hardy and Jeff Hardy) to win the TNA World Tag Team Championship, Alexander failed to defeat Leon Slater for the TNA X Division Championship, and Eddie failed to defeat Mike Santana for the TNA World Championship in Eddie's Feast or Fired cash-in match despite interference from Alisha Edwards, who had rejoined The System that same night. On the May 14 episode of Impact!, Alexander ended Slater's record-tying 298-day reign to win the TNA X Division Championship after defeating him 2–1 in a 2-out-of-3 falls match. On June 28 at Slammiversary, Eddie lost to Moose in a No Surrender match to end their year-long feud, Myers and Bronson lost the TNA World Tag Team Championship back to The Hardys in a four-way tag team ladder match, and Alexander defeated Amazing Red, Fabian Aichner, Frankie Kazarian, KC Navarro, Leon Slater, and Mr. Elegance in an Ultimate X match to retain the TNA X Division Championship. On the July 2 episode of Impact!, Alisha was eliminated from the inaugural TNA Knockouts Television Championship tournament in the first round by Jada Stone. On August 23 at Lockdown, Alexander lost the title back to Slater in a Last Man Standing Steel Cage match, while Eddie, Myers, Bronson, and Alisha defeated Ricky Sosa, Fabian Aichner, KC Navarro, and Jada Stone in a Lethal Lockdown match.

== Members ==
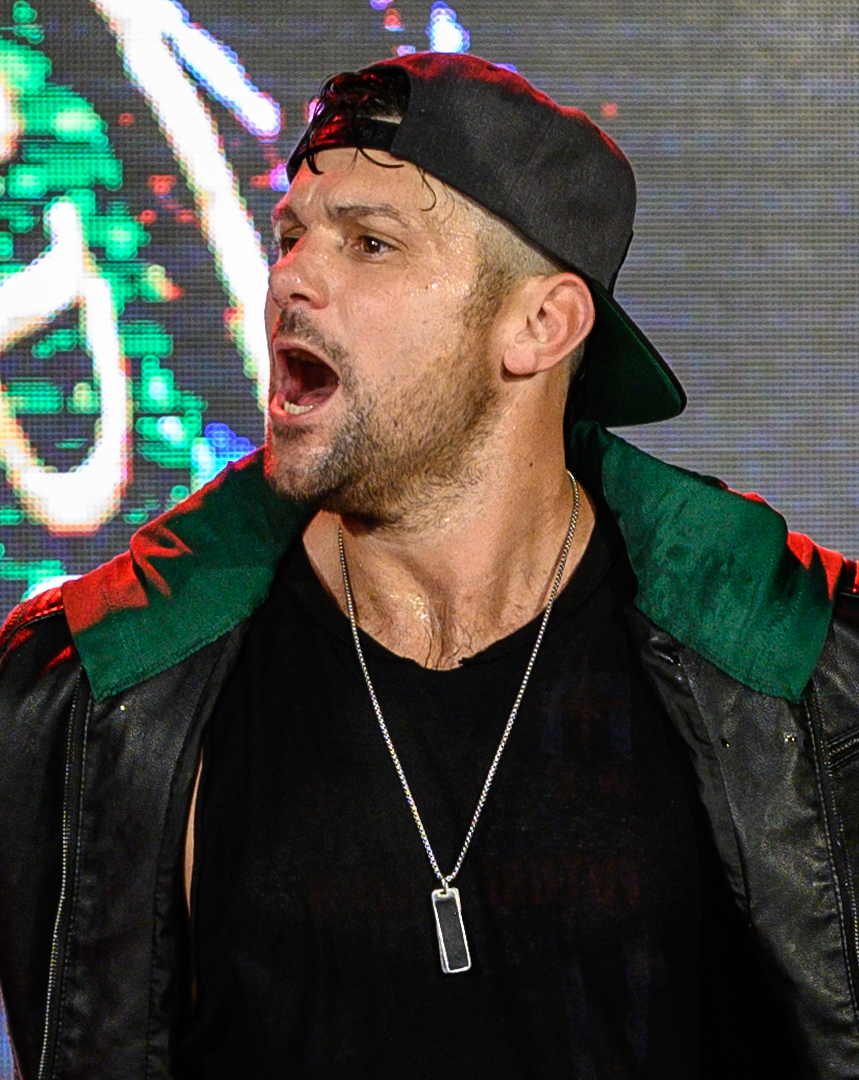
Eddie Edwards (*/II)

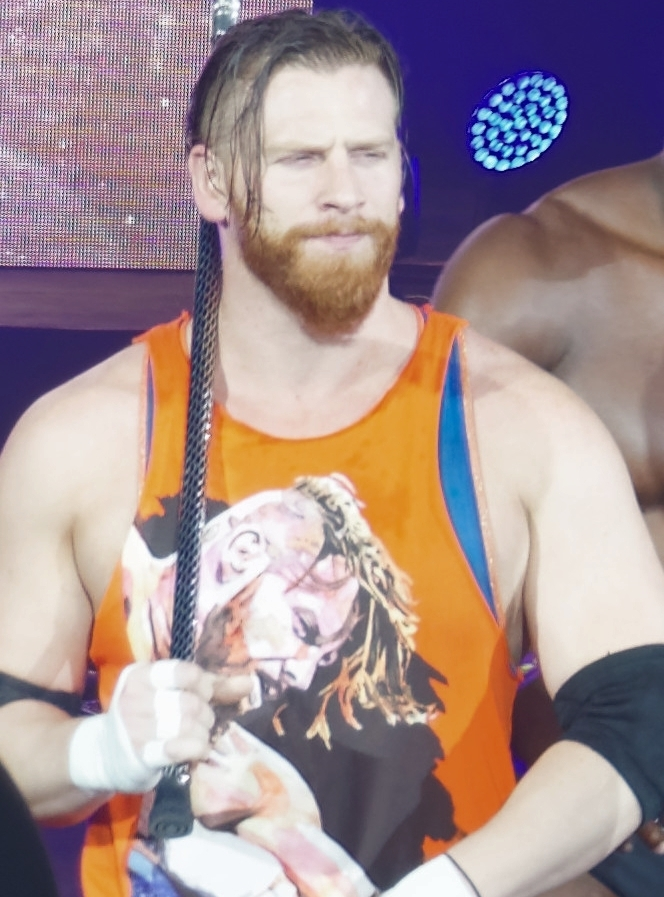
Brian Myers

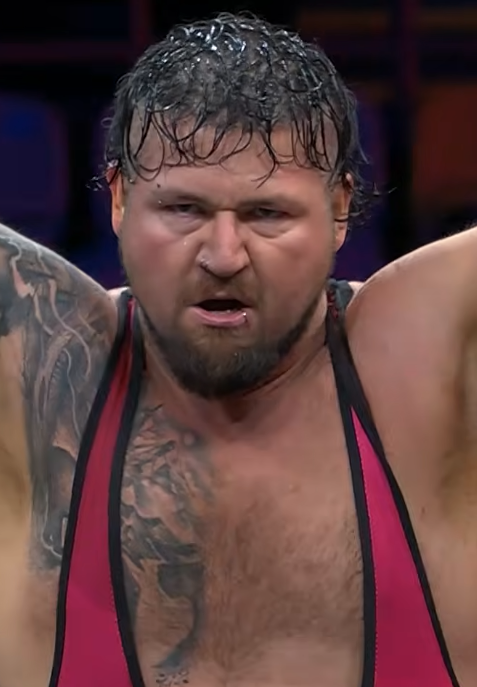
Bear Bronson

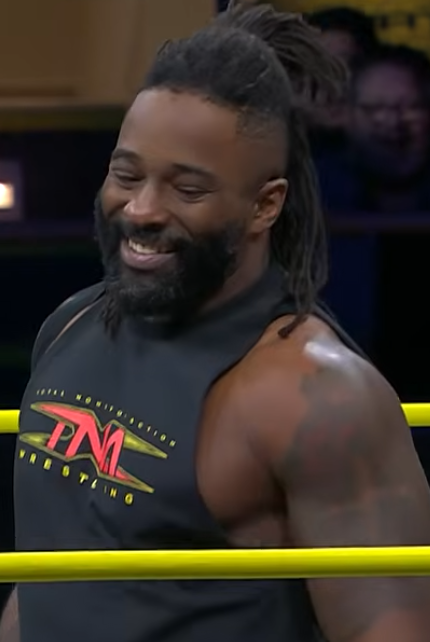
Cedric Alexander

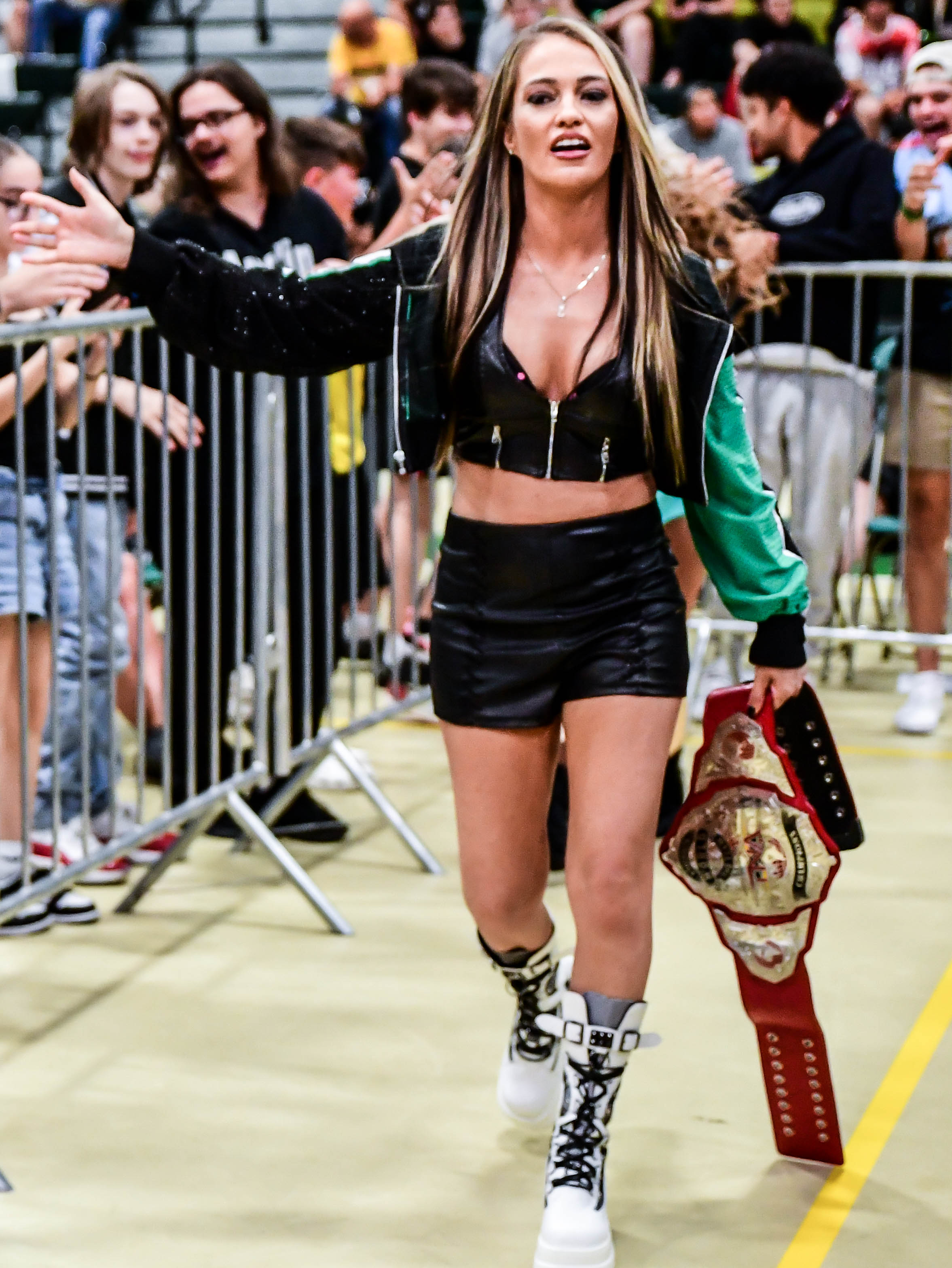
Alisha Edwards

*	Founding member
I-II	Leader(s)
M	Manager

=== Current ===
Member		Joined
Eddie Edwards (II)	*	January 13, 2024
Brian Myers	*	January 13, 2024
Bear Bronson		January 22, 2026
Cedric Alexander		January 22, 2026
Alisha Edwards (M)	*	January 13, 2024 (Note: Alisha temporarily left the group from January 29, 2026 till April 11, 2026.)

=== Former ===
Member		Joined	Left
Masha Slamovich		May 3, 2024	September 13, 2024
JDC		September 5, 2024	January 22, 2026
Moose (I)	*	January 13, 2024	January 22, 2026

== Championships and accomplishments ==
- Create A Pro Wrestling
  - CAP Tag Team Championship (1 time) – Myers and Eddie
- Lucky Pro Wrestling
  - LPW Women's Championship (1 time, current) – Alisha
- Square Circle Expo
  - SCX Prime Championship (1 time, current) – Myers
- Total Nonstop Action Wrestling
  - TNA World Championship (1 time) – Moose
  - TNA X Division Championship (2 times) – Moose (1), Alexander (1)
  - TNA World Tag Team Championship (3 times) – Myers and Eddie (2), Myers and Bronson (1)
  - TNA Knockouts World Tag Team Championship (1 time) – Alisha and Masha Slamovich
  - Turkey Bowl (2025)– Myers
  - TNA Year End Awards (1 time)
    - Faction of the Year (2025)
  - Feast or Fired (2026 – World Championship contract) – Eddie
