= Bear Bronson =

American professional wrestler (born 1995)

- Bronson in August 2026

Personal information
- Born: Joseph Fitzpatrick; November 13, 1995 (age 30) East Islip, New York U.S.

Professional wrestling career
- Ring names: Bear Bronson; Bronson; Hous Blazer; Joe Bronson; Bulk Bronson
- Billed height: 6 ft 2 in (188 cm)
- Billed weight: 280 lb (127 kg)
- Trained by: Brian Myers; Pat Buck; Create A Pro Wrestling Academy
- Debut: February 13, 2015

Joseph Fitzpatrick (born November 13, 1995), better known by the ring name Bear Bronson, is an American professional wrestler. He is signed to Total Nonstop Action Wrestling (TNA), where he is a member of The System and former one-time TNA World Tag Team Champions. He also makes appearances on the independent circuit. He is also known for his time in All Elite Wrestling (AEW) and Ring of Honor (ROH), where he was a member of the Iron Savages.

== Professional wrestling career ==
=== Early career (2015–2020) ===
Bronson began his in-ring career in August 2015. In 2017, he began teaming up with Bear Boulder as Bear Country, making one-off appearances in both Combat Zone Wrestling and Limitless Wrestling. The team then became regular members of Chaotic Wrestling in 2018 and won the Chaotic Wrestling Tag Team Championship later that year. The team joined Beyond Wrestling in 2019 and began to garner greater attention from fans. Notable matches included victories over Santana and Ortiz, the Butcher and the Blade, and the Beaver Boys. In 2019 Bear Country began to travel the United States to appear in various indie promotions. After a stop in Black Label Pro, the team became tag team champions in Xtreme Wrestling Alliance. Finally, the duo returned to CZW for a full-time stint.

=== All Elite Wrestling / Ring of Honor (2020–2025) ===
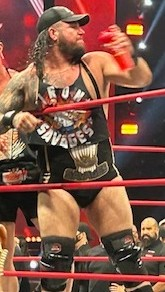
Bronson in 2023

Bear Country debuted in All Elite Wrestling on an episode of AEW Dark in December 2020 losing to The Dark Order. The following week Bronson and Boulder appeared on Dark again, this time facing the Jurassic Express in a losing effort. In May 2021 the team was officially signed to the AEW roster. On August 22, 2022, AEW filed a trademark for a new name. The team returned the following day, again on AEW Dark, and defeated them team of Vary Morales and Levis Valenzuela. They also introduced their new manager, JT Davidson. Davidson would depart the group in April 2023, which Boulder said in an interview in 2024, was due to ongoing health issues. In May 2023 the Iron Savages debuted in AEW's partner promotion Ring of Honor against Peter Avalon and Ryan Nemeth of The Wingmen, the Iron Savages were escorted to the ring by new member Jacked Jameson in a winning effort. The following month the trio challenged the Mogul Embassy for the ROH World Six-Man Tag Team Championship but was unsuccessful. The Iron Savages made their debut on Collision on August 12, 2023, losing to The Acclaimed. The team appeared on Collision again the week after, in a trios match against Juice Robinson and The Gunns in a losing effort.

Following Boulder's release in February 2025 due to his domestic violence arrest, Jameson and Bronson would go their separate ways as Bronson would also leave AEW a few months after Boulder.

=== Total Nonstop Action Wrestling (2025–present) ===
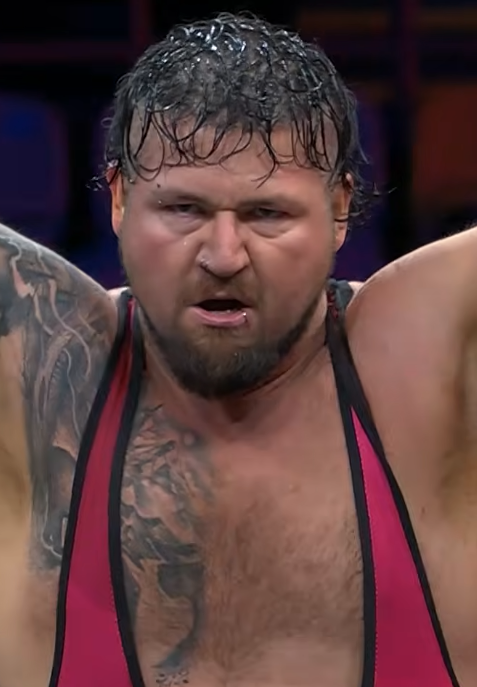
Bronson in January 2026

Bronson made his Total Nonstop Action Wrestling (TNA) debut on December 5, 2025, at Final Resolution alongside The Andersons (Brock Anderson and C. W. Anderson), where they lost to Brian Myers, Eddie Edwards and Moose of The System. A week later on TNA Impact!, Bronson unsuccessfully challenged Frankie Kazarian for the TNA World Championship.

On the January 22, 2026 episode of Impact!, Bronson and Cedric Alexander were introduced as the newest members of the System, while the stable also attacked Moose and JDC, turning heel and kicking them out of the group. On January 29, TNA officially announced that Bronson had signed with the promotion. On April 11 at Rebellion, Bronson and Brian Myers defeated The Hardys (Jeff Hardy and Matt Hardy) to win the TNA World Tag Team Championship. They would lose the titles back to The Hardys in a four-way ladder match at Slammiversary on June 28, ending their reign at 78 days.

== Personal life ==
On June 2, 2024, Fitzpatrick came out as bisexual. He has been married to Gabby Forza since October 2024.

== Championships and accomplishments ==
- Blitzkrieg! Pro
  - B!P Tag Team Championship (1 time, current) – with Gabby Forza
- Chaotic Wrestling
  - Chaotic Wrestling New England Championship (1 time)
  - Chaotic Wrestling Tag Team Championship (1 time) – with Bear Boulder
- Beyond Wrestling
  - Wrestling Open Championship (1 time, current)
- Create A Pro Wrestling
  - CAP Championship (1 time)
- Extreme Wrestling Alliance
  - EWA Tag Team Championship (1 time) – with Bear Boulder
- Five Borough Wrestling
  - FBW Tag Team Championship (2 times) – with AJ Spectre
- IndependentWrestling.tv
  - Undisputed IWTV Independent Wrestling World Championship (1 time)
- Pro Wrestling Illustrated
  - Ranked No. 87 of the 500 best singles wrestlers in the PWI 500 in 2026
  - Tag Team of the Year Ranked No. 76 (2022) – with Bear Boulder
- Pro Wrestling Zero1 USA Northeast
  - ZERO1 USA Northeast Heavyweight Championship (1 time, final)
- Total Nonstop Action Wrestling
  - TNA World Tag Team Championship (1 time) – with Brian Myers
- WrestlePro
  - WrestlePro Silver Championship (1 time)
  - WrestlePro Tag Team Championship (1 time) – with Bear Boulder
