= Dániel Németh =

Dániel Németh may refer to:

- Dániel Németh (photographer)
- Dániel Németh (footballer)
