= Miklós Németh (disambiguation) =

Miklós Németh (born 1948) is a Hungarian economist and politician who served as Prime Minister of Hungary from 1988 to 1990.

Miklós Németh may also refer to:

- Miklós Németh (cyclist) (1910–?), Hungarian cyclist who competed at the 1936 Summer Olympics
- Miklós Németh (painter), (1934-2012) Hungarian Abstract painter
- Miklós Németh (footballer) (born 1946), Hungarian association football player
- Miklós Németh (javelin thrower) (born 1946), Hungarian athlete competed at the 1968/72/76/80 Summer Olympics
