= TNA Rebellion (2026) =

Professional wrestling event

Rebellion
- Promotional poster featuring various wrestlers
- Promotion: Total Nonstop Action Wrestling
- Date: April 11, 2026
- City: Cleveland, Ohio, U.S.
- Venue: Wolstein Center
- Attendance: 3,929

Pay-per-view chronology
← Previous; Genesis	Next → Slammiversary

Rebellion chronology
← Previous; 2025	Next → —

The 2026 Rebellion was a professional wrestling pay-per-view event produced by Total Nonstop Action Wrestling (TNA). It took place on Saturday, April 11, 2026, at the Wolstein Center in Cleveland, Ohio, United States. It was the eighth event under the Rebellion chronology and featured wrestlers from WWE's NXT brand due to the ongoing partnership between the two promotions.

Ten matches were contested at the event, including one on the pre-show. In the main event, Mike Santana defeated Eddie Edwards to retain the TNA World Championship. In other prominent matches, Leon Slater defeated Cedric Alexander to retain the TNA X Division Championship, Arianna Grace defeated Léi Yǐng Lee to retain the TNA Knockouts World Championship, Mustafa Ali defeated Trey Miguel to win the TNA International Championship, and The System (Bear Bronson and Brian Myers) defeated The Hardys (Jeff Hardy and Matt Hardy) to win the TNA World Tag Team Championship. The event also featured the returns of KC Navarro and EC3 and the announcement of ODB's TNA Hall of Fame induction at Bound for Glory.

== Production ==
=== Background ===
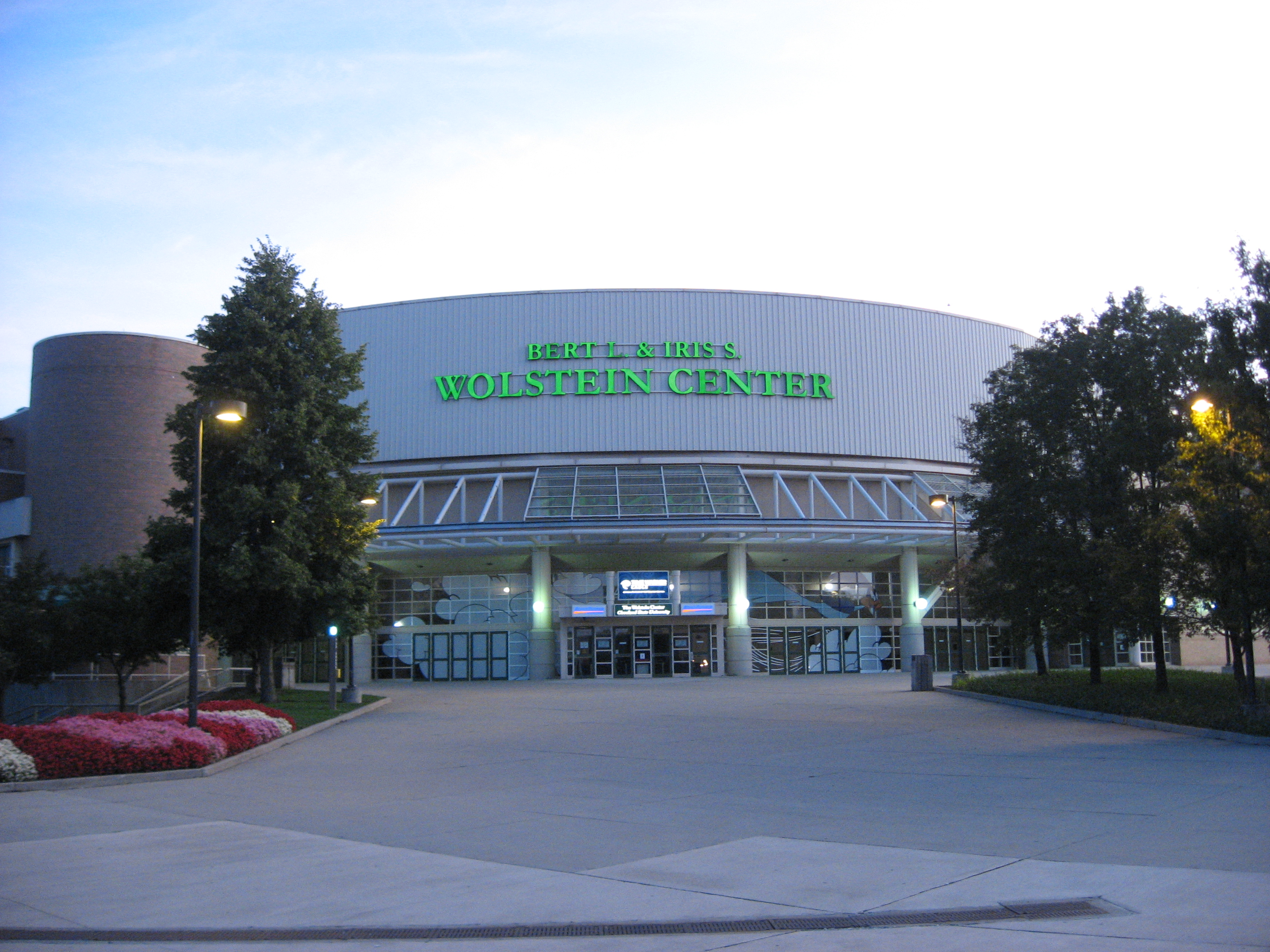
Rebellion took place at the Wolstein Center in Cleveland, Ohio, United States.

Rebellion is a professional wrestling pay-per-view (PPV) event produced by Total Nonstop Action Wrestling (TNA). The event was first held in 2019, and has been held annually in April. It has since been considered one of TNA's premiere PPV events, along with Bound for Glory and Slammiversary. On February 13, 2026, TNA announced Rebellion would take place on Saturday, April 11, at the Wolstein Center in Cleveland, Ohio, United States.

=== Storylines ===
The event featured professional wrestling matches that involved different wrestlers from pre-existing scripted feuds and storylines. Wrestlers portrayed villains, heroes, or less distinguishable characters in scripted events that built tension and culminated in a wrestling match or series of matches.

At Sacrifice on March 27, Order 4's Mustafa Ali and Tasha Steelz wrestled against TNA International Champion Trey Miguel and Jada Stone in an intergender tag team match. Towards the end of the match, Order 4's John Skyler and Jason Hotch restrained Miguel to the bottom rope with zip ties, allowing Ali to pin Stone for the victory. Later in the broadcast, TNA announced that Miguel would defend the TNA International Championship against Ali at Rebellion.

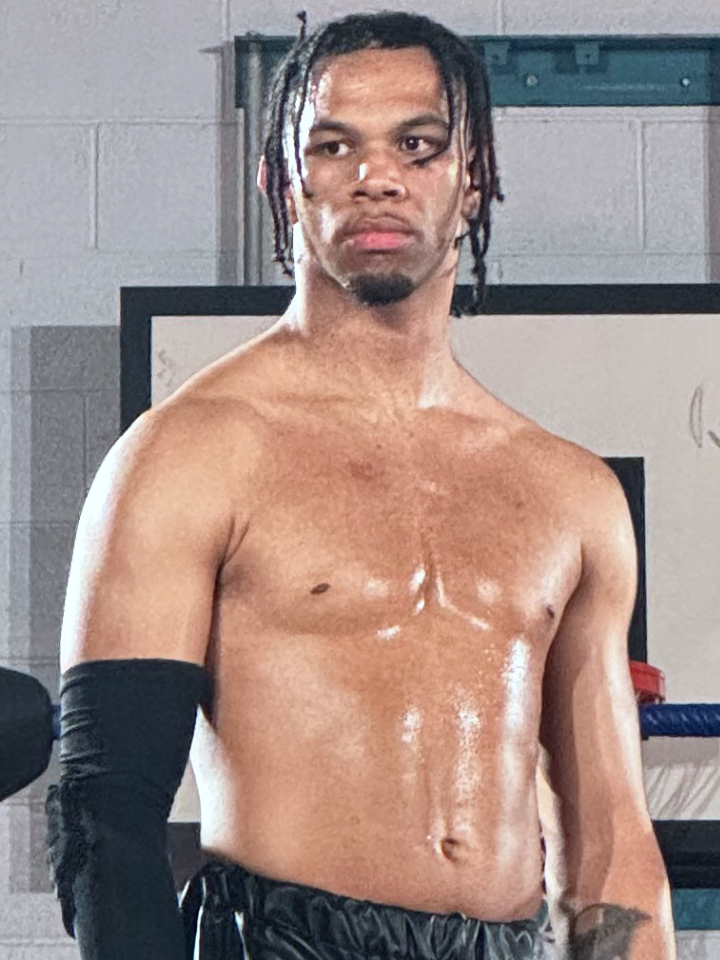
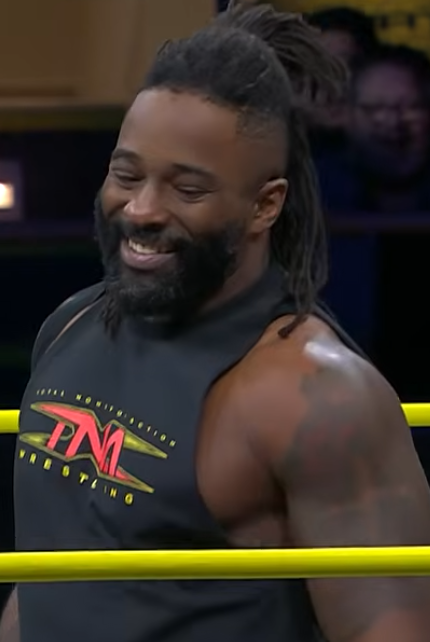
After Cedric Alexander's TNA X Division Championship opportunity at Genesis was cancelled, he received his shot at the title against reigning champion Leon Slater at Rebellion.

On the December 11, 2025 episode of Thursday Night Impact!, Cedric Alexander won a six-way match to earn a TNA X Division Championship match against reigning champion, Leon Slater. He was originally set to face Slater for the title at Genesis in a three-way match also involving former champion Moose. However, on the debut of Thursday Night Impact! on AMC on January 15, 2026, it was reported that Slater would be unable to travel to the United States due to visa issues and thus unable to defend his title. Two months later, at Sacrifice, TNA announced that Alexander would receive his title opportunity against Slater at Rebellion.

On the March 5 episode of Impact!, The System (Bear Bronson and Brian Myers) won a four-way tag team match to earn a shot at the TNA World Tag Team Championship. At Sacrifice, TNA announced that they would receive their title opportunity against reigning champions The Hardys (Jeff Hardy and Matt Hardy) at Rebellion. Two days prior to their scheduled title defense at Rebellion, The Hardys defeated The Righteous (Vincent and Dutch) in a tables tag team elimination match.

At No Surrender on February 13, The Elegance Brand (Heather by Elegance and M by Elegance) successfully defended the TNA Knockouts World Tag Team Championship against Indi Hartwell and Xia Brookside. Following the match, the champions and the rest of the stable (Ash by Elegance, Mr. Elegance, and The Personal Concierge) were confronted by TNA Hall of Famer Mickie James. A brawl ensued between James and The Elegance Brand, which saw Hartwell and Brookside intervene to help James clear the ring. On the February 26 episode of Impact!, James and Ash met for a face-to-face confrontation. James cited her role in helping Ash enter TNA and criticized Ash's recent social media conflicts with former Knockouts World Champions. The segment concluded with The Elegance Brand ambushing James, with Ash executing James' own finisher, the Mick-DT. The following week, the stable had an altercation with TNA legend ODB, who humiliated the group by dousing them in her brand of seasoning with the assistance of the cast of Mama June: Family Crisis. At Sacrifice, The Elegance Brand—appearing without Ash—insulted ODB and the host city of New Orleans. ODB interrupted and introduced the returning Taryn Terrell, a former Knockouts World Champion and New Orleans native. Mickie James then joined the duo, and the three veterans engaged in a physical confrontation with the stable. In a digital exclusive video released after the event, TNA Director of Authority Santino Marella met with the legends and officially sanctioned a six-woman Hardcore Country tag team match between the two trios for Rebellion.

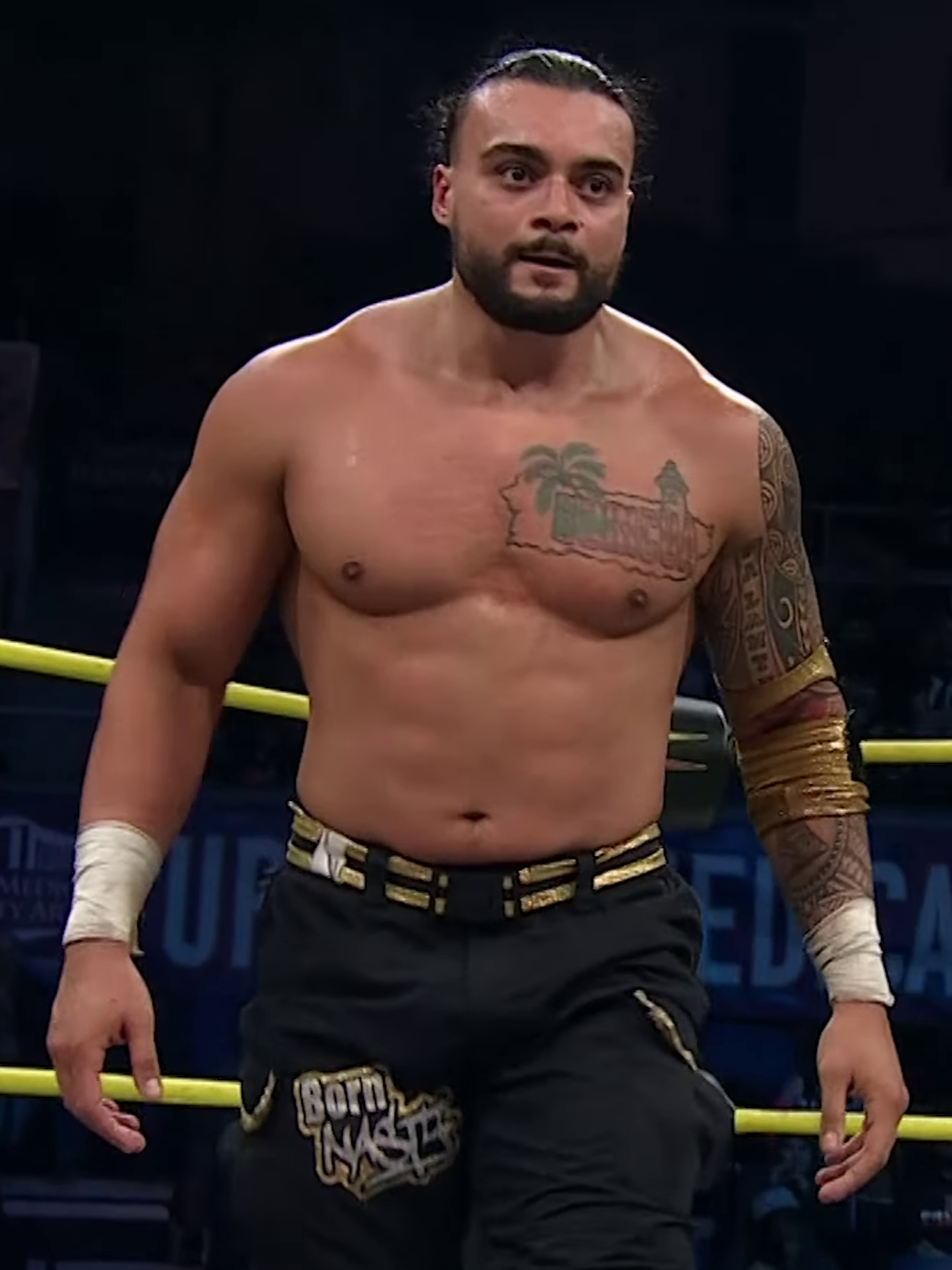
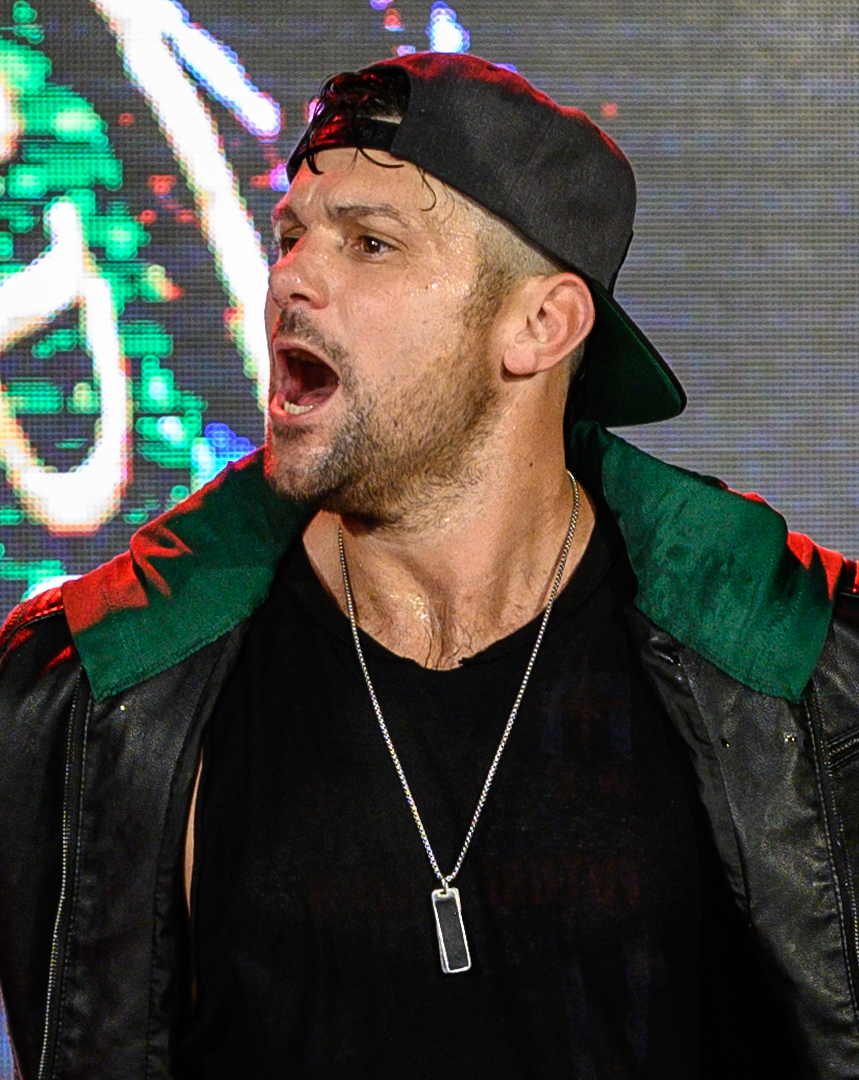
Mike Santana defended the TNA World Championship against Eddie Edwards. This was Edwards' Feast or Fired world title opportunity.

On the January 22 episode of Impact!, Eddie Edwards competed in the Feast or Fired match, where he secured Briefcase No. 3. The following week's episode revealed that Edwards' briefcase contained the rights to a future TNA World Championship match. At Sacrifice, TNA World Champion Mike Santana defended the TNA World Championship against Steve Maclin. When Santana hit Maclin with a superkick, Maclin was legitimately knocked out, and then he was immediately checked by medical personnel. Edwards then came out to attack Santana, but their brawl ended with Santana executing a frog splash on Edwards through a table. On March 30, TNA announced that Edwards will invoke his Feast or Fired TNA World Championship opportunity against Santana at Rebellion.

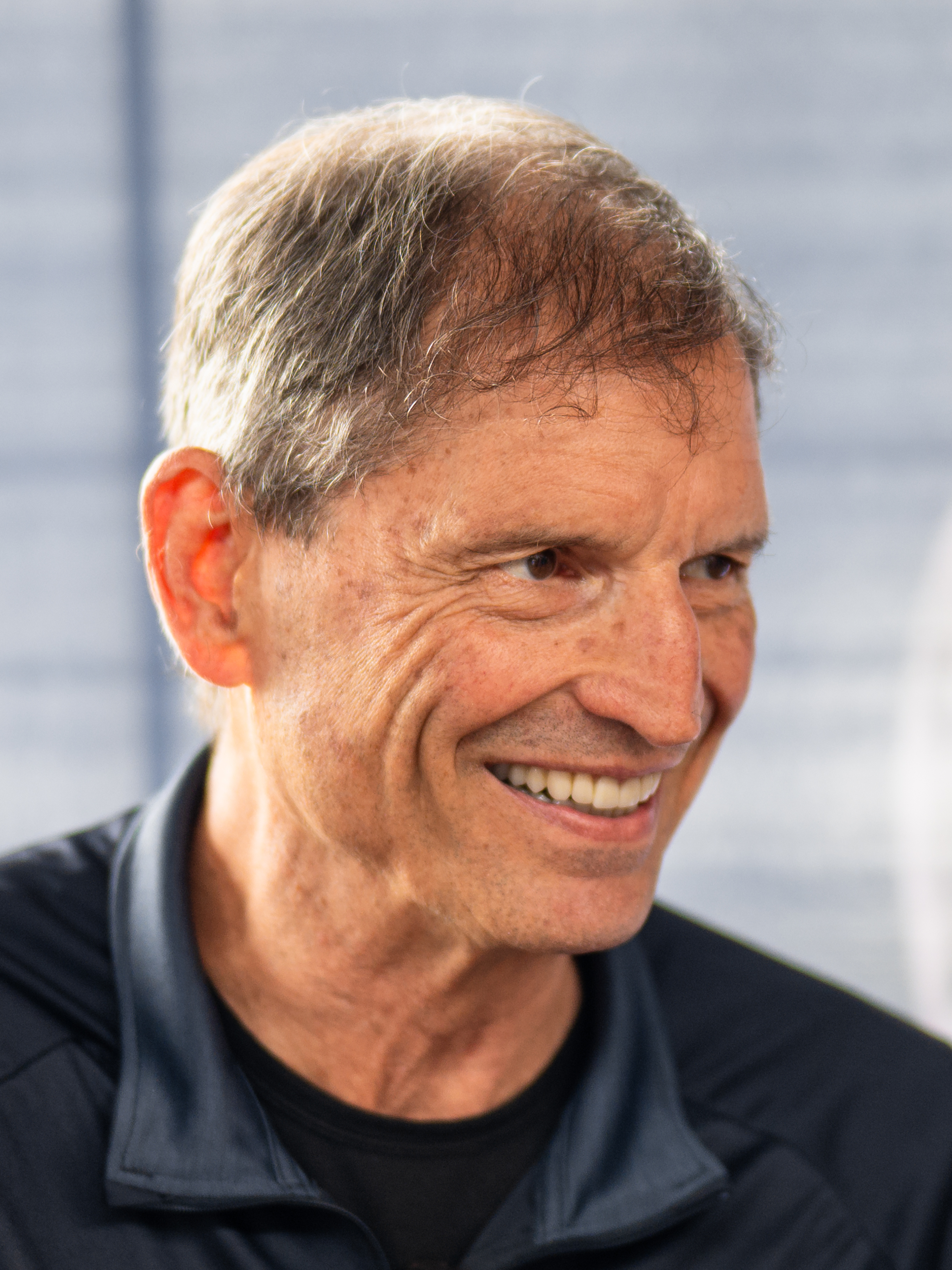
Cleveland Browns legend Bernie Kosar was in Nic Nemeth's corner in his match against A. J. Francis at Rebellion.

At Sacrifice, Call Your Shot Gauntlet co-winner Nic Nemeth declared he would invoke his championship opportunity to challenge for the TNA World Championship at Rebellion. However, on March 29, TNA released a video showing Nic's brother Ryan Nemeth finding his brother laid out on the floor unconscious backstage after an apparent attack the night of Sacrifice. On April 2, during an appearance on Busted Open Radio, Nic challenged his mystery attacker for a match at Rebellion, while announcing that Cleveland Browns legend Bernie Kosar will be in his corner. On that night's episode of Impact!, A. J. Francis revealed that he had attacked Nemeth, claiming he hates that Nic kept stealing opportunities from him. Later that night, TNA announced a match between Nic and Francis at Rebellion.

At No Surrender, NXT wrestler Arianna Grace defeated Léi Yǐng Lee to win the TNA Knockouts World Championship. A month later at Sacrifice, Grace retained the title in a three-way match against Lee and Dani Luna, who had been owed a title match due to missing Genesis because of visa issues. On the subsequent episode of Impact!, TNA Director of Operations Daria Rae announced that Lee would get her one-on-one rematch at Rebellion. In the main event that night, Grace successfully defended the title against Lee's tag team partner Xia Brookside, confirming a match between Grace and Lee for the title at Rebellion.

During Moose and Eddie Edwards' match at Sacrifice, Order 4's Special Agent 0 attacked Moose 31 seconds into the match. On the April 2 episode of Impact!, TNA announced Moose versus Special Agent 0 at Rebellion.

On April 10, TNA released a video on social media teasing the return of EC3 at Rebellion. The following day, the promotion officially confirmed his return at the event.

== Event ==
Other on-screen personnel
Role	Name
Commentators	Matthew Rehwoldt
Commentators	Tom Hannifan
Ring announcer	McKenzie Mitchell
Referees	Alice Lane
Referees	Daniel Spencer
Referees	Frank Gastineau
Referees	Paige Prinzivalli
Interviewer	Gia Miller
Pre-show panel	Daria Rae
Pre-show panel	Matthew Rehwoldt
Pre-show panel	Tom Hannifan

=== Pre-show ===
During the Countdown to Rebellion show, Ryan Nemeth faced BDE. BDE hit a springboard cutter, bouncing off the second rope and grabbing Nemeth's head as he fell backward, for a near-fall. He later attempted a diving splash, jumping off the top rope onto a supine Nemeth; however, Nemeth evaded by rolling toward the ring apron. Nemeth later executed the "Hollywood Ending", in which Nemeth jumped towards BDE and grabbed him to drive him into the mat as Nemeth fell backward, for the pinfall victory.

=== Preliminary matches ===
In the event's opener, Leon Slater defended the TNA X Division Championship against Cedric Alexander. The match began with Slater utilizing his agility. Alexander hoisted Slater into a suplex from the floor, in which Alexander lifted Slater and bridged to slam him on his back, and dropping him onto the ring apron, targeting Slater’s neck following an injury previously sustained at the hands of Eric Young. He dropped Slater with a brainbuster on the top turnbuckle, in which Slater hooked Young's pants before lifting Young up and falling on his back to make Young vertically land on their head, and followed up with the "Lumbar Check", making Young's back collide with his knees; however, Slater placed his foot on the bottom rope to break the pin. Alexander attempted to use the title belt as a weapon. However, Slater intercepted him, executing the "Styles Clash" onto the title belt, lifting Slater upside down before driving his body down face-first. Slater then transitioned into the "Swanton 450°", leaping off the top rope with his arms out-stretched to perform a front somersault with 1.5 rotations just as he lands on a supine Alexander, to secure the pinfall victory and continue his pursuit of becoming the longest-reigning X Division Champion.

Next, Frankie Kazarian faced Elijah. Kazarian utilized Elijah's guitar strap to repeatedly strike him, which was allowed by referee Frank Gastineau because it was in the ring since the match began. Elijah countered Kazarian into a powerbomb, in which he lifted Kazarian up to his shoulders before slamming him down to the mat, for a two-count. He then hit Kazarian with the guitar strap multiple times before executing a chokeslam, in which Elijah lifted Kazarian by the neck before slamming him to the mat, for a near-fall. Kazarian introduced Elijah's guitar into the ring and executed a slingshot cutter onto the instrument, launching himself towards Elijah before forcing Elijah to fall face-first as Kazarian fell backward. Elijah attempted to strike Kazarian with a fragment of the broken guitar, but the referee intercepted it. While the referee was occupied clearing the debris from the ring, Kazarian hit Elijah with a low blow, attacking Elijah's groin, which allowed him to pin Elijah for the victory.

Moose (accompanied by Alisha Edwards) versus Special Agent 0 followed. Agent 0 drove Moose into the ring post with a powerbomb. Moose responded with a superplex, flipping Agent 0 over his shoulders off the top rope. Moose speared Agent 0 through the ropes, sending both men through a table at ringside. Following a powerbomb from Moose onto the steel steps, Agent 0's Order 4 stablemates Jason Hotch and John Skyler interfered. While Hotch distracted the official, Skyler pulled Edwards off the ring apron. Moose successfully intercepted Skyler with a big boot, kicking Skyler's head with his sole as Skyler charged towards him, but in the ensuing chaos, Edwards appeared to have suffered an ankle injury. Agent 0 struck a distracted Moose with a Claymore Kick and then hit a chokebomb onto the ring apron, in which Agent 0 lifted Moose up by his neck with both hands before throwing Moose down. Agent 0 delivered a second chokebomb to get the pinfall and his first singles victory in TNA.

In a six-woman Hardcore Country tag team match, where there were no disqualifications and countouts, the team of Mickie James, ODB, and Taryn Terrell faced The Elegance Brand (Ash by Elegance, Heather by Elegance, and M by Elegance), who was accompanied by Mr. Elegance and The Personal Concierge. James, ODB, and Terrell blindsided The Elegance Brand. Terrell executed a suplex on Heather onto a ring covered in lollipops. ODB was temporarily tied to the ring ropes by Heather and M. James, ODB, and Terrell forced The Personal Concierge into a pickle suit before Terrell dove towards The Elegance Brand at ringside. After Mr. Elegance interfered, ODB used a pair of tongs to grab his testicles. Ash blinded ODB with a hairspray, and then all three members of The Elegance Brand simultaneously pinned ODB to secure the victory.

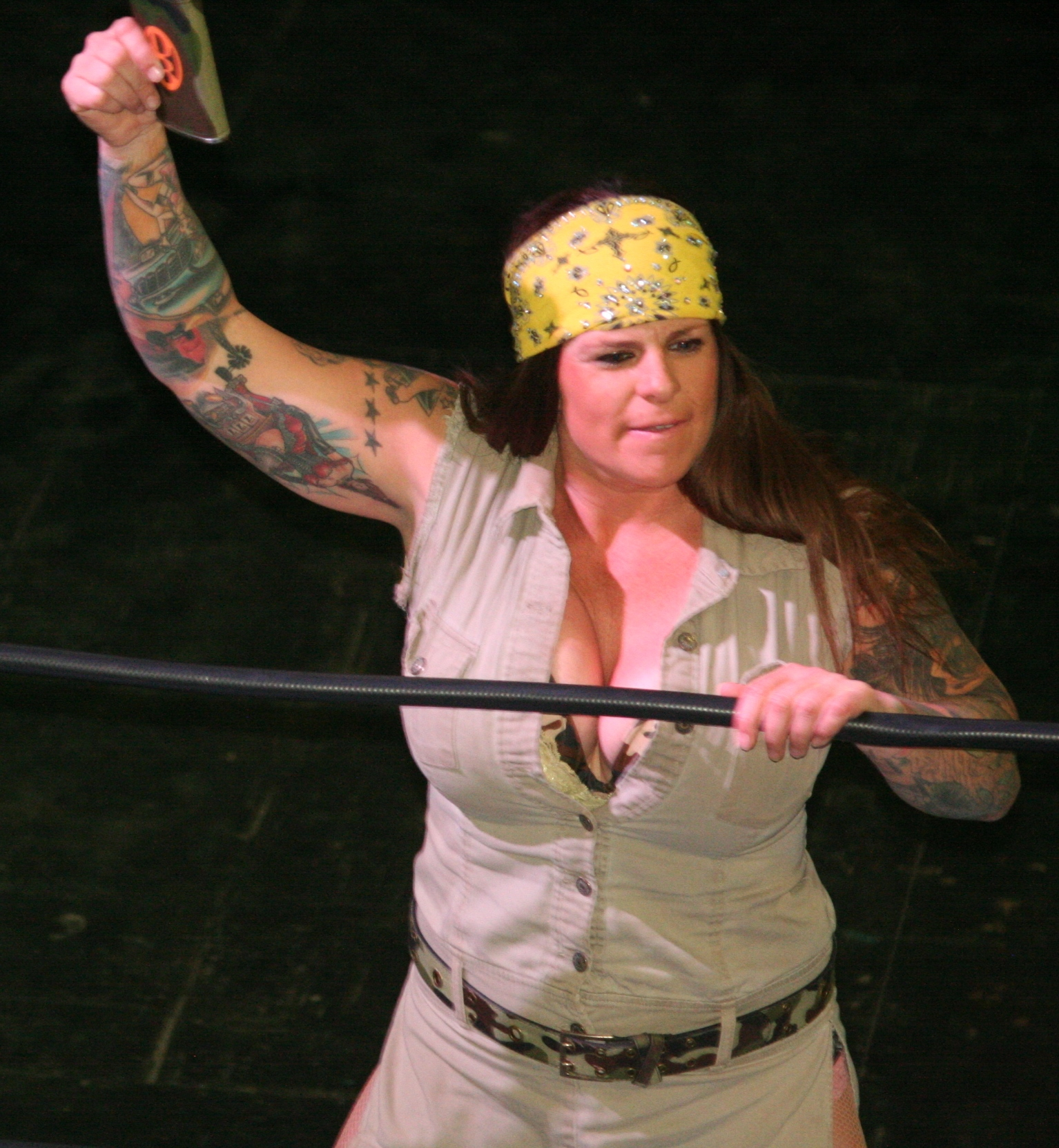
Former four-time TNA Knockouts Champion ODB will be inducted into the TNA Hall of Fame at Bound for Glory.

Following the match, TNA President Carlos Silva and TNA Head of Talent Relations Tommy Dreamer entered the ring. Dreamer spoke about ODB’s TNA history before Silva announced that ODB's induction into the TNA Hall of Fame at Bound for Glory.

Next, Nic Nemeth (accompanied by Bernie Kosar) went one-on-one against A. J. Francis. Francis used his size to ground Nemeth, but Nemeth hoisted Francis and countered a chokeslam attempt into a mid-air "Famouser", in which Nemeth jumped and pushed Francis' head down with his leg, for a near-fall. Nemeth executed the "Avalanche Danger Zone", leaping up to Francis who was on the top rope before pulling Francis' head backward. Francis intercepted a dive attempt to the outside and chokeslammed Nemeth. After Francis struck the referee with a steel chair, Kosar confronted him and then the distraction was compounded by KC Navarro's, Francis’s former tag team partner, unexpected return from injury. Kosar struck Francis with the chair, allowing Nemeth to execute a second "Danger Zone". Navarro helped the official to return to the ring, who then counted the pinfall victory for Nemeth.

The next match was for the TNA Knockouts World Championship between defending champion Arianna Grace (accompanied by Channing "Stacks" Lorenzo) against Léi Yǐng Lee (accompanied by Xia Brookside). After the referee caught Lorenzo assisting Grace to avoid a pinfall, the official ejected Lorenzo from ringside. Lee executed the "Blockbuster", performing a somersault over Grace before grabbing her head and driving it backwards to the mat, for a near-fall. Grace raked Lee's eyes and slammed her face onto Grace's knee. After Lee executed the "Warrior’s Way", in which Lee grabbed Grace's hair and spun around before driving Grace down to the mat face-first, Brookside unexpectedly placed Grace’s foot on the bottom rope to break the pinfall. When a confused Lee confronted her, Brookside attacked her, driving Lee into the steel steps. Brookside returned Lee to the ring, helping Grace retain her title via pinfall.

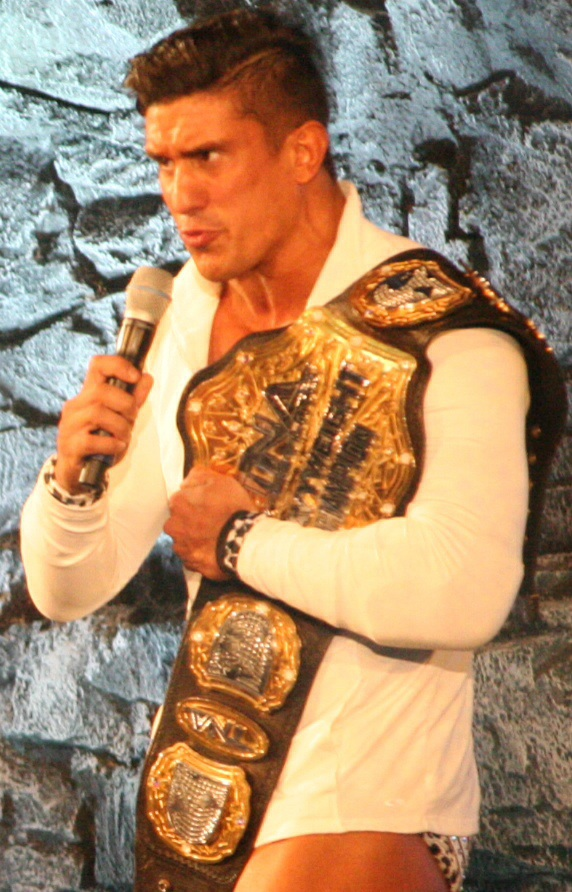
After six years away from TNA, former two-time TNA World Heavyweight Champion EC3 returned.

Following the confirmation of EC3's return to TNA, Eric Young came to the ring to criticize EC3’s background, labeling him a nepo baby and referencing his kayfabe aunt, Dixie Carter. EC3 responded with a clothesline that sent Young to the floor. Then, EC3 challenged Young to a match on the following episode of Thursday Night Impact!.

Next, Trey Miguel defended the TNA International Championship against Mustafa Ali (accompanied by his Order 4 stablemates Tasha Steelz, John Skyler, and Jason Hotch). Miguel drove Ali into the steel steps with a meteora, dropping both of his knees onto Ali's shoulder. However, the champion damaged his knees in the process, which Ali targeted throughout the match. Miguel countered a 450° splash attempt into a mid-air cutter. Miguel followed up with a diving meteora, but was unable to secure the pinfall. As the referee was distracted by Tasha Steelz, Jason Hotch and John Skyler used their helmets to strike Miguel. Ali executed a 450° splash to get the pinfall victory and capture the TNA International Championship.

The next match was The Hardys' (Matt Hardy and Jeff Hardy) TNA Tag Team Championship defense against The System's Brian Myers and Bear Bronson. The match began with the challengers isolating Matt. Jeff eventually entered the fray, delivering a flurry of offense to Bronson for a near-fall. Matt executed the "Twist of Fate" on Bronson, falling backward while pulling Bronson down face-first. As Jeff prepared for a dive, Myers snapped Jeff's previously injured left arm across the top rope. With Matt neutralized at ringside following a backdrop from Myers, the challengers hit Jeff with a superkick and slam combination to get the pinfall victory and end The Hardys' 265-day reign.

=== Main event ===
In the main event, Mike Santana defended the TNA World Championship against Eddie Edwards. After Edwards executed a fisherman suplex on the ring apron, hooking Santana's leg and then flipping him over, which sent both men to the floor. Edwards remove the ringside mats to expose the concrete floor. Santana countered Edwards by dropping him onto the concrete, appearing to injure Edwards' right leg. Both competitors narrowly avoided a countout, returning to the ring at the count of nine. Alisha Edwards, Eddie's wife, arrived on crutches, but her injury from earlier in the night was revealed as a ruse when Moose appeared on the stage and played a video showing her deception. A brawl broke out at ringside between Moose and Eddie's The System stablemates Bear Bronson and Brian Myers. Amidst the chaos, Eddie hit the "Boston Knee Party", in which Eddie struck Santana's head with his knee, for a near-fall. Following a mistimed interference attempt by Alisha and a distraction by The System member Cedric Alexander, Santana neutralized Alexander with a cutter. Despite Eddie delivering a second "Boston Knee Party", Santana became the first person to kick out of the maneuver twice. Santana eventually blocked a strike and hit the "Spin the Block", spinning around before leaping his arm forward to knock Eddie down, to win the match via pinfall and continue his reign as TNA World Champion.

== Reception ==
On April 11, 2026, WrestleTix reported an estimate of 3,929 tickets distributed at the Wolstein Center in Cleveland, Ohio, United States for the 2026 edition of Rebellion.

Professional ratings
Publication		Matches										Overall	Ref
Publication		1^{P}	2	3	4	5	6	7	8	9	10	Overall	Ref
411Mania	Kevin Pantoja	2/5 stars	4.5/5 stars	1.5/5 stars	2.75/5 stars	2/5 stars	2/5 stars	1.5/5 stars	4.25/5 stars	3/5 stars	3.25/5 stars	7.0/10	
411Mania	Ryan Ciocco	2.5/5 stars	4/5 stars	3.25/5 stars	3.5/5 stars	3.5/5 stars	3/5 stars	2.5/5 stars	4.5/5 stars	3/5 stars	3.25/5 stars	7.8/10	
411Mania	Thomas Hall	C	B	C+	B	D–	B–	C+	B	B–	B–	8.0/10	
Nerdly		—N/a	4.0/5	3.0/5	3.5/5	3.0/5	2.5/5	2.5/5	4.0/5	3.0/5	3.0/5	3.0/5	
The Chairshot		2.25/5 stars	4/5 stars	3.25/5 stars	3/5 stars	2.5/5 stars	3/5 stars	1.5/5 stars	4/5 stars	3.25/5 stars	3.75/5 stars	7.75/10	
Match order: 1. Pre-show: BDE vs. Ryan Nemeth; 2. Leon Slater (c) vs. Cedric Alexander for the TNA X Division Championship; 3. Elijah vs. Frankie Kazarian; 4. Moose vs. Special Agent 0; 5. The Elegance Brand (Ash by Elegance, Heather by Elegance, and M by Elegance) vs. Mickie James, ODB, and Taryn Terrell in a six-woman Hardcore Country tag team match; 6. A. J. Francis vs. Nic Nemeth; 7. Arianna Grace (c) vs. Léi Yǐng Lee for the TNA Knockouts World Championship; 8. Trey Miguel (c) vs. Mustafa Ali for the TNA International Championship; 9. The Hardys (Jeff Hardy and Matt Hardy) (c) vs. The System (Bear Bronson and Brian Myers) for the TNA World Tag Team Championship; 10. Mike Santana (c) vs. Eddie Edwards for the TNA World Championship

Andrew Balaz of The Chairshot described it as a "really good show" with no moments of "pure garbage", noting that while it was not a contender for event of the year, it exceeded his low expectations. Ryan Ciocco of 411Mania felt that the show's high points outweighed its low points, acknowledging the TNA X Division Championship and TNA International Championship matches as the top highlights. Phil Wheat of Nerdly praised those same two bouts as the show-stealers; however, he argued that the event overrelied on interferences and cheap finishes that felt "messy rather than meaningful". Kevin Pantoja of 411Mania noted that despite having a good time, the excessive 3.5 to 4-hour runtime caused the show to "[drag] at times". Jason Powell of Pro Wrestling Dot Net felt that the extra 30 minutes were unnecessary despite the event being good overall. Meanwhile, Thomas Hall of 411Mania viewed it as an improvement over Sacrifice, concluding that the majority of the card was "more than strong enough" to overcome the lack of a "big must-see match", singling out the six-woman Hardcore Country tag team match as the only "disaster".

Ciocco described the pre-show match as "not bad, not great", though he noted that Ryan Nemeth's victory was the right creative decision. Powell enjoyed Nemeth's "cheap heat antics" and was relieved BDE did not waste his first singles victory on a pre-show, hoping that it would receive a proper build. In contrast, Pantoja argued it lacked memorable moments.

John Pollock of Post Wrestling called the TNA X Division Championship match a contender for the event's best match, while both Ciocco and Hall commended TNA's reliable tradition of opening pay-per-view events with X Division matches. Powell dubbed it a "hot" opener, adding that he was relieved The System did not win all titles. Pantoja lauded the match as "super engaging", highlighting a brainbuster on the turnbuckle into the "Lumbar Check" by Cedric Alexander as one of the best he had ever seen live, while praising Leon Slater's Swanton 450° splash as equally impressive. However, Balaz argued that while the match was good, it could have been better; he criticized Slater's selling, claiming he was carried by Alexander and that Slater did not deserve to break Austin Aries' record.

Pollock found the "utterly ridiculous" match between Frankie Kazarian and Elijah entertaining, noting that it "overdelivered", though he stressed that the referee permitting foreign objects in a standard match created a "gaping hole of logic" that was impossible to ignore. Pantoja argued that his initial skepticism about the match's placement was justified; he panned the bout as "pretty messy", "too long", and hampered by a "dumb ending", pointing out the referee's hypocrisy allowing weapons throughout the match only to stop Elijah at the end, allowing Kazarian's low blow. Hall asserted that Kazarian deserved better booking. Meanwhile, Ciocco enjoyed it as a "fun brawl" and appreciated the referee refraining from disqualifying either competitor despite the rampant use of foreign objects.

Hall characterized it as a grueling fight that hinged on a moment of humanity, arguing that Special Agent 0 defeating one of TNA's most decorated stars aided his trajectory as a monster. Pollock described it as a "meat match", noting that TNA was elevating Agent 0 from being Order 4's muscle. Pantoja called it a "solid [boss] fight", and Ciocco described it as a "solid big man match" with surprising agility. Conversely, Balaz dismissed the match as overbooked and "pathetic" while labeling Agent 0 "the most pathetic 'enforcer'".

Hall labeled the six-woman Hardcore Country tag team match a disaster, writing that it was "all over the place" and that the comedy went on "way too long". Pollock felt the comedy-based weapons match failed to click. Powell sarcastically dubbed it a "mat classic", while Darrin Lily of Pro Wrestling Torch noted that The Elegance Brand was "over the top". Pantoja conceded that while the match lacked structure and felt "beyond sloppy", he enjoyed it in a "trainwreck" way, comparing it to enjoying a bad movie. Balaz called it "completely stupid" yet fun, while Ciocco described it as "crazy fun" with the correct outcome, even if it was not for everyone.

Powell framed the match between A. J. Francis and Nic Nemeth as a straightforward contest where the imposing Francis dominated early before Cleveland native Nemeth mounted a comeback with aid from KC Navarro and Cleveland Browns legend Bernie Kosar. Ciocco highlighted the result as a "feel-good moment", even as he noted the bout dragged and fell short of preceding matches. Pantoja questioned its place on the card, panning its unnecessary length and overreliance on near-falls to elicit crowd pops. In contrast, Hall found it better than anticipated, though he admitted a personal preference for Nemeth as a babyface.

Pantoja noted that the audience immediately rejected the TNA Knockouts World Championship match with chants of "This is boring" and "You can't wrestle", observing that while he felt bad the crowd gave up on them early, Léi Yǐng Lee's repetitive offense and a lack of heat ultimately kept the match from rising above "boring" status. Balaz called it "bad booking" to barely build up Lee and Xia Brookside only to break them up via a forced, predictable heel turn. Hall felt that it effectively executed the obvious heel turn, which was the right direction, while Ciocco added that an underhanded victory suited Grace well since she is not a "prototypical champion".

Ciocco declared that the TNA International Championship match surpassed the opener as both competitors threw everything they had at each other, while Pantoja praised it as "fantastic pro wrestling". He singled out Mustafa Ali as "one of the best" and marveled at an assisted cutter and Trey Miguel's tornado DDT to the outside were unlike anything he had ever seen. Powell commended the "innovative and impressive" maneuvers, though he admitted a personal lack of interest in the title itself. Hall felt Ali's title victory was long overdue and hoped it would propel him further up the card.

Lily categorized the TNA World Tag Team Championship match as a "standard" tag team bout, while both Pantoja and Hall assessed it as "good enough", with Pantoja describing the match as "paint-by-numbers". Hall added that a title loss for The Hardys was long overdue. Balaz felt it had the "perfect way" for them to lose the titles following their tables match just days prior. Ciocco and Powell expressed surprise at Brian Myers and Bear Bronson capturing the title, with Ciocco noting the shock despite The Hardys entering the match in a weakened state.

Pantoja noted that Mike Santana did his best to elevate the main event's importance as the drama picked up late. Ciocco described the bout as transitioning from a "slow, plodding affair" into an "overbooked cluster", adding that Alisha Edwards' betrayal failed to deliver a strong payoff. Powell supported the decision to have Santana retain and agreed with presenting Edwards' betrayal without treating it as a shocker. Hall appreciated Moose anticipating Edwards' turn, but felt the overall contest lacked a "ton of fire" due to a faint personal rivalry between the competitors, concluding that while it was not a bad match, the guaranteed Feast or Fired title shot ultimately undercut its impact and kept it from being great.

== Aftermath ==
On the May 7, 2026, episode of Thursday Night Impact!, Léi Yǐng Lee defeated Arianna Grace to capture the TNA Knockouts World Championship with Xia Brookside banned from ringside. Three weeks later, Xia, Elayna Black, Mara Sadè defeated Lee and TNA Knockouts World Tag Team Champions The Elegance Brand (Heather by Elegance and M by Elegance) in a six-woman tag team Champions Challenge after Xia pinned Lee, earning the right to challenge for Lee's title. At Slammiversary on June 28, Brookside defeated Lee to win the title after she pushed Lee face-first into the exposed turnbuckle.

On the May 14 episode of Impact!, Cedric Alexander defeated TNA X Division Champion Leon Slater 2–1 in a two-out-of-three falls match to win the title, ending Slater's record-tying 298-day reign.

== Results ==
No.	Results	Stipulations	Times
1^{P}	Ryan Nemeth defeated BDE by pinfall	Singles match	5:01
2	Leon Slater (c) defeated Cedric Alexander by pinfall	Singles match for the TNA X Division Championship	14:23
3	Frankie Kazarian defeated Elijah by pinfall	Singles match	12:29
4	Special Agent 0 defeated Moose (with Alisha Edwards) by pinfall	Singles match	10:45
5	The Elegance Brand (Ash by Elegance, Heather by Elegance, and M by Elegance) (with Mr. Elegance and The Personal Concierge) defeated Mickie James, ODB, and Taryn Terrell by pinfall	Six-woman Hardcore Country tag team match	10:47
6	Nic Nemeth (with Bernie Kosar) defeated A. J. Francis by pinfall	Singles match	14:32
7	Arianna Grace (c) (with Channing "Stacks" Lorenzo) defeated Léi Yǐng Lee (with Xia Brookside) by pinfall	Singles match for the TNA Knockouts World Championship	8:40
8	Mustafa Ali (with Tasha Steelz, Jason Hotch and John Skyler) defeated Trey Miguel (c) by pinfall	Singles match for the TNA International Championship	12:40
9	The System (Bear Bronson and Brian Myers) defeated The Hardys (Jeff Hardy and Matt Hardy) (c) by pinfall	Tag team match for the TNA World Tag Team Championship	10:21
10	Mike Santana (c) defeated Eddie Edwards by pinfall	Singles match for the TNA World Championship; This was Edwards' Feast or Fired world title opportunity.	19:12
(c) / – the champion(s) heading into the match; P / – the match was broadcast on the pre-show
