= Feast or Fired =

Professional wrestling match type

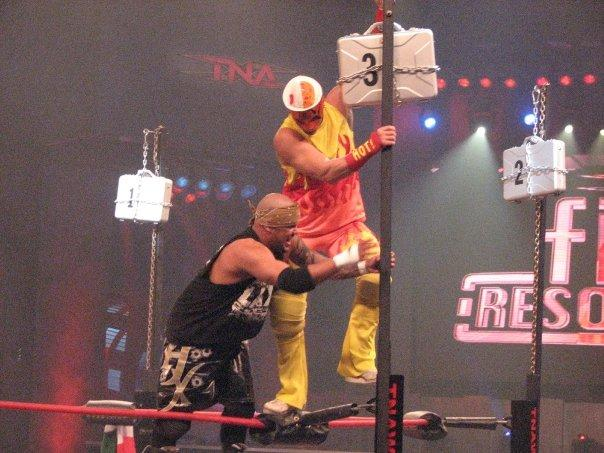
Homicide (left) and Curry Man (right) competing in the 2008 Feast or Fired match at Final Resolution. Curry Man claimed the no. 3 briefcase which contained a pink slip, resulting in his firing.

Feast or Fired is a professional wrestling match concept featured in Total Nonstop Action Wrestling (TNA). The idea is based on the object on a pole match, which sees wrestlers trying to gain possession of items hanging from poles attached to the ring posts. In this case, the participants in the match try to grab one of four briefcases from the poles. In the match itself, a wrestler can only claim a briefcase if he/she leaves the ring with it and both feet touch the floor.

== Stipulations ==
Inside each of the briefcases is some sort of paperwork. Traditionally. One of the cases holds a contract for a TNA World Championship match, one holds a contract for a TNA X Division Championship match, and one holds a contract for a TNA World Tag Team Championship match (with a partner of that wrestler's choosing). The fourth and final briefcase contains a pink slip, which fires the wrestler carrying it. For some matches, alternate championships have been used, with the TNA King of the Mountain Championship and the TNA Digital Media Championship in place of the X Division Championship in 2016 and 2023, respectively, and the TNA International Championship in lieu of the Tag Team Championship in 2026.

The winners of the briefcases do not reveal what is in them that night. Instead, they are revealed in a segment on a later episode of Impact!. Before the contents of the cases are revealed, each wrestler is given a choice to keep their case or forfeit it, which protects the wrestler from being fired, but also gives up any potential title match.

Once a wrestler wins a briefcase, it may be (and has been) defended in matches similar to the way championships are.

The allocated time period during which a wrestler must invoke their title opportunity has not been explicitly stated, all that has been said is that the title opportunity can be invoked "anywhere, anytime", making it similar in fashion to the WWE Money in the Bank ladder match contract, which lasts for one year.

== Matches ==
Year	Event	Date	Case	Winner	Prize	Time	Other competitors
2007	Turning Point	December 2	4	Petey Williams	TNA X Division Championship match	3:04	Chris Harris, Christopher Daniels, Elix Skipper, Hernandez, Homicide, Jimmy Rave, Kip James, Lance Hoyt, Shark Boy, and Sonjay Dutt
2007	Turning Point	December 2	1	B.G. James	TNA World Tag Team Championship match	4:53	Chris Harris, Christopher Daniels, Elix Skipper, Hernandez, Homicide, Jimmy Rave, Kip James, Lance Hoyt, Shark Boy, and Sonjay Dutt
2007	Turning Point	December 2	3	Senshi	Pink slip	6:27	Chris Harris, Christopher Daniels, Elix Skipper, Hernandez, Homicide, Jimmy Rave, Kip James, Lance Hoyt, Shark Boy, and Sonjay Dutt
2007	Turning Point	December 2	2	Scott Steiner	TNA World Heavyweight Championship match	11:54	Chris Harris, Christopher Daniels, Elix Skipper, Hernandez, Homicide, Jimmy Rave, Kip James, Lance Hoyt, Shark Boy, and Sonjay Dutt
2007	On the December 13 episode of TNA Impact!, Jim Cornette offered Steiner $50,000 for his briefcase, which he refused. Steiner then switched briefcases with Williams, stating afterwards that he would get his original briefcase back the next week. At Against All Odds, Steiner defeated Williams to win both briefcases, after a distraction from a disguised Rhaka Khan. On the April 17, 2008 episode of Impact!, Steiner issued an open challenge, which Williams answered. Williams lost after Khan interfered. Steiner would later form an alliance with Williams and give him the X Division briefcase.; On the December 6 episode of Impact!, Christopher Daniels defeated Senshi with Elix Skipper as the special guest referee to win his briefcase, which turned out to contain the pink slip, resulting in Daniels being fired in kayfabe.						
2008	Final Resolution	December 7	4	Hernandez	TNA World Heavyweight Championship match	3:53	Alex Shelley, B.G. James, Chris Sabin, Consequences Creed, Cute Kip, Jimmy Rave, Lance Rock, Shark Boy, and Sonjay Dutt
2008	Final Resolution	December 7	3	Curry Man	Pink slip	6:31	Alex Shelley, B.G. James, Chris Sabin, Consequences Creed, Cute Kip, Jimmy Rave, Lance Rock, Shark Boy, and Sonjay Dutt
2008	Final Resolution	December 7	1	Homicide	TNA X Division Championship match	9:33	Alex Shelley, B.G. James, Chris Sabin, Consequences Creed, Cute Kip, Jimmy Rave, Lance Rock, Shark Boy, and Sonjay Dutt
2008	Final Resolution	December 7	2	Jay Lethal	TNA World Tag Team Championship match	12:10	Alex Shelley, B.G. James, Chris Sabin, Consequences Creed, Cute Kip, Jimmy Rave, Lance Rock, Shark Boy, and Sonjay Dutt
2008	On the April 30 edition of Impact!, Hernandez and Homicide had their briefcases stolen by the debuting British Invasion. Hernandez won it back from Rob Terry at Hard Justice, while Homicide won it back from Douglas Williams in a ladder match on the July 9, 2009 episode of Impact!.; Curry Man was fired in kayfabe.						
2009	Final Resolution	December 20	2	Sheik Abdul Bashir	Pink slip	4:47	Kiyoshi, Cody Deaner, Consequences Creed, Eric Young, Homicide, James Storm, Jay Lethal, and Robert Roode
2009	Final Resolution	December 20	4	Rob Terry	TNA X Division Championship match	5:00	Kiyoshi, Cody Deaner, Consequences Creed, Eric Young, Homicide, James Storm, Jay Lethal, and Robert Roode
2009	Final Resolution	December 20	1	Kevin Nash	TNA World Tag Team Championship match	7:14	Kiyoshi, Cody Deaner, Consequences Creed, Eric Young, Homicide, James Storm, Jay Lethal, and Robert Roode
2009	Final Resolution	December 20	3	Samoa Joe	TNA World Heavyweight Championship match	9:20	Kiyoshi, Cody Deaner, Consequences Creed, Eric Young, Homicide, James Storm, Jay Lethal, and Robert Roode
2009	On the January 19, 2010 episode of Impact!, Terry was forced by his British Invasion teammates to give his briefcase to Doug Williams.; Bashir was legitimately fired.						
2013	Impact Wrestling	December 12	3	Ethan Carter III	TNA World Tag Team Championship match	2:06	Austin Aries, Chris Sabin, Curry Man, Dewey Barnes, Hernandez, James Storm, Norv Fernum, and Samoa Joe
2013	Impact Wrestling	December 12	2	Zema Ion	TNA X Division Championship match	8:39	Austin Aries, Chris Sabin, Curry Man, Dewey Barnes, Hernandez, James Storm, Norv Fernum, and Samoa Joe
2013	Impact Wrestling	December 12	4	Chavo Guerrero	Pink slip	12:19	Austin Aries, Chris Sabin, Curry Man, Dewey Barnes, Hernandez, James Storm, Norv Fernum, and Samoa Joe
2013	Impact Wrestling	December 12	1	Gunner	TNA World Heavyweight Championship match	14:11	Austin Aries, Chris Sabin, Curry Man, Dewey Barnes, Hernandez, James Storm, Norv Fernum, and Samoa Joe
2013	Gunner retained the briefcase against James Storm on the December 26 episode of Impact Wrestling after their match ended in a double countout.; Gunner successfully defended the briefcase in a Briefcase on a Pole match against James Storm at Impact Wrestling: Genesis on January 16, 2014 (aired on January 23).; Gunner successfully defended the briefcase in a tag team match with James Storm against Bad Influence on the January 30 episode of Impact Wrestling; Gunner successfully defended his briefcase and won Carter's briefcase in a tag team ladder match on Impact Wrestling on January 31, 2014 (aired on February 13). Gunner teamed with James Storm, while Carter teamed with Magnus. Gunner would give the Tag Team Championship briefcase to Storm.; Guerrero was legitimately fired.						
2015	Impact Wrestling	January 23	2	Velvet Sky	Pink slip	1:17	Bram, Crazzy Steve, Davey Richards, DJ Z, Eddie Edwards, Gunner, Jessie Godderz, Robbie E, and Samuel Shaw
2015	Impact Wrestling	January 23	4	Rockstar Spud	TNA X Division Championship match	4:20	Bram, Crazzy Steve, Davey Richards, DJ Z, Eddie Edwards, Gunner, Jessie Godderz, Robbie E, and Samuel Shaw
2015	Impact Wrestling	January 23	1	Austin Aries	TNA World Heavyweight Championship match	5:45	Bram, Crazzy Steve, Davey Richards, DJ Z, Eddie Edwards, Gunner, Jessie Godderz, Robbie E, and Samuel Shaw
2015	Impact Wrestling	January 23	3	Magnus	TNA World Tag Team Championship match	7:43	Bram, Crazzy Steve, Davey Richards, DJ Z, Eddie Edwards, Gunner, Jessie Godderz, Robbie E, and Samuel Shaw
2015	On the August 28 taping of Impact Wrestling, GFW co-founders Jeff and Karen Jarrett took Magnus' briefcase away because he was part of their roster and gave his title match to Brian Myers and Trevor Lee.; Sky was at ringside to support Robbie E and climbed up to grab the case on his behalf. Since she was the one who grabbed the case, she was the one who was fired in kayfabe.						
2016	Impact Wrestling	January 26	2	Grado	Pink slip	4:16	Aiden O'Shea, Bobby Roode, Bram, Chris Melendez, Eric Young, Jessie Godderz, Robbie E, and Rockstar Spud
2016	Impact Wrestling	January 26	1	Drew Galloway	TNA World Heavyweight Championship match	10:07	Aiden O'Shea, Bobby Roode, Bram, Chris Melendez, Eric Young, Jessie Godderz, Robbie E, and Rockstar Spud
2016	Impact Wrestling	January 26	4	Eli Drake	TNA King of the Mountain Championship match	12:38	Aiden O'Shea, Bobby Roode, Bram, Chris Melendez, Eric Young, Jessie Godderz, Robbie E, and Rockstar Spud
2016	Impact Wrestling	January 26	3	James Storm	TNA World Tag Team Championship match	16:06	Aiden O'Shea, Bobby Roode, Bram, Chris Melendez, Eric Young, Jessie Godderz, Robbie E, and Rockstar Spud
2016	Grado was fired in kayfabe, but it was later revealed that Drake had peeked into his case before they were supposed to be opened, and may have switched the contents of his case with Grado's. After posting video evidence of this, Grado was given a chance to win his job back if he could beat Drake in a ladder match with a new contract at stake, which he did on March 16.						
2018	Impact!	March 15 (Taped: January 13)	2	Petey Williams	Impact X Division Championship match	5:53	Caleb Konley, KM, Rohit Raju, Taiji Ishimori, Trevor Lee, and Tyrus
2018	Impact!	March 15 (Taped: January 13)	4	Moose	Impact World Championship match	10:52	Caleb Konley, KM, Rohit Raju, Taiji Ishimori, Trevor Lee, and Tyrus
2018	Impact!	March 15 (Taped: January 13)	3	Ethan Carter III	Pink slip	14:44	Caleb Konley, KM, Rohit Raju, Taiji Ishimori, Trevor Lee, and Tyrus
2018	Impact!	March 15 (Taped: January 13)	1	Eli Drake	Impact World Tag Team Championship match	16:44	Caleb Konley, KM, Rohit Raju, Taiji Ishimori, Trevor Lee, and Tyrus
2018	Eli Drake defeated Moose to win his briefcase in a Case vs. Case match on the April 12 episode of Impact!.; Ethan Carter III was legitimately fired.						
2023	Impact 1000	September 14 (Taped: September 9)	3	Chris Bey	Impact World Tag Team Championship match	2:54	Alpha Bravo, Bhupinder Gujjar, Black Taurus, Brian Myers, Heath, Jai Vidal, Joe Hendry, John Skyler, Johnny Swinger, Jonathan Gresham, Kevin Knight, Kushida, Laredo Kid, PCO, Sami Callihan, and Steve Maclin
2023	Impact 1000	September 14 (Taped: September 9)	1	Crazzy Steve	Impact Digital Media Championship match	6:17	Alpha Bravo, Bhupinder Gujjar, Black Taurus, Brian Myers, Heath, Jai Vidal, Joe Hendry, John Skyler, Johnny Swinger, Jonathan Gresham, Kevin Knight, Kushida, Laredo Kid, PCO, Sami Callihan, and Steve Maclin
2023	Impact 1000	September 14 (Taped: September 9)	4	Yuya Uemura	Pink slip	9:45	Alpha Bravo, Bhupinder Gujjar, Black Taurus, Brian Myers, Heath, Jai Vidal, Joe Hendry, John Skyler, Johnny Swinger, Jonathan Gresham, Kevin Knight, Kushida, Laredo Kid, PCO, Sami Callihan, and Steve Maclin
2023	Impact 1000	September 14 (Taped: September 9)	2	Moose	Impact World Championship match	13:34	Alpha Bravo, Bhupinder Gujjar, Black Taurus, Brian Myers, Heath, Jai Vidal, Joe Hendry, John Skyler, Johnny Swinger, Jonathan Gresham, Kevin Knight, Kushida, Laredo Kid, PCO, Sami Callihan, and Steve Maclin
2023	Yuya Uemura was legitimately fired.						
2026	Thursday Night Impact!	January 22 (Aired: January 29)	1	Eric Young	TNA X Division Championship match	3:40	A. J. Francis, Brian Myers, The Hometown Man, Jason Hotch, John Skyler, Mance Warner, Rich Swann, and Ryan Nemeth
2026	Thursday Night Impact!	January 22 (Aired: January 29)	2	Steve Maclin	Pink slip	4:50	A. J. Francis, Brian Myers, The Hometown Man, Jason Hotch, John Skyler, Mance Warner, Rich Swann, and Ryan Nemeth
2026	Thursday Night Impact!	January 22 (Aired: January 29)	4	Trey Miguel	TNA International Championship match	7:23	A. J. Francis, Brian Myers, The Hometown Man, Jason Hotch, John Skyler, Mance Warner, Rich Swann, and Ryan Nemeth
2026	Thursday Night Impact!	January 22 (Aired: January 29)	3	Eddie Edwards	TNA World Championship match	8:16	A. J. Francis, Brian Myers, The Hometown Man, Jason Hotch, John Skyler, Mance Warner, Rich Swann, and Ryan Nemeth
2026	Steve Maclin was fired in kayfabe.; On the March 5, 2026, episode of Thursday Night Impact!, Director of Operations Daria Rae officially reinstated Maclin.						

== Feast or Fired Cash-in Matches ==
=== Cash-in matches ===
Legend
Won cash-in match and the championship
Won cash-in match but not the championship
Lost cash-in match

#	Case Holder	Championship	Event	Date	Result
1	B.G. James	TNA World Tag Team Championship	Against All Odds	February 10, 2008	With Bullet Bob Armstrong, they lost to A.J. Styles and Tomko
2	Petey Williams	TNA X Division Championship	Impact!	April 17, 2008	Defeated Jay Lethal.
3	Scott Steiner	TNA World Heavyweight Championship	Sacrifice	May 11, 2008	Lost to Samoa Joe.
4	Jay Lethal	TNA World Tag Team Championship	Impact!	December 16, 2008	With Consequences Creed, they defeated Beer Money, Inc. (Robert Roode and James Storm).
5	Homicide	TNA X Division Championship	Impact!	June 25, 2009	Defeated Suicide.
6	Hernandez	TNA World Heavyweight Championship	Impact!	January 15, 2009	Defeated Sting via disqualification after the Main Event Mafia interfered. TNA Managing Partner Mick Foley gave Hernandez a second chance by returning the briefcase.
6	Hernandez	TNA World Heavyweight Championship	No Surrender	September 20, 2009	Lost to new champion AJ Styles in a five-way match that also involved defending champion Kurt Angle, Matt Morgan, and Sting.
7	Doug Williams	TNA X Division Championship	Impact!	January 19, 2010	Defeated Amazing Red.
8	Samoa Joe	TNA World Heavyweight Championship	Against All Odds	February 14, 2010	Lost to AJ Styles in a No Disqualification match with Eric Bischoff as the special guest referee.
9	Kevin Nash	TNA World Tag Team Championship	Impact!	May 4, 2010	The Band (Kevin Nash and Scott Hall) defeated Matt Morgan.
10	Zema Ion	TNA X Division Championship	Impact Wrestling	January 30, 2014 (Aired February 6)	Lost to Austin Aries.
11	Gunner	TNA World Heavyweight Championship	Impact Wrestling	January 31, 2014 (Aired February 20)	Lost to Magnus.
12	James Storm	TNA World Tag Team Championship	Impact Wrestling	September 19, 2014 (Aired November 12)	With Abyss, they defeated The Wolves (Davey Richards and Eddie Edwards).
13	Rockstar Spud	TNA X Division Championship	Impact Wrestling	January 31, 2015 (Aired March 20)	Defeated Low Ki.
14	Austin Aries	TNA World Heavyweight Championship	Destination X	May 11, 2015 (Aired June 10)	Lost to Kurt Angle.
15	Brian Myers and Trevor Lee	TNA World Tag Team Championship	Impact Wrestling	July 28, 2015 (Aired September 2)	Defeated The Wolves (Eddie Edwards and Davey Richards).
16	James Storm	TNA World Tag Team Championship	Impact Wrestling	January 31, 2016 (Aired March 8)	Beer Money defeated The Wolves (Davey Richards and Eddie Edwards).
17	Drew Galloway	TNA World Heavyweight Championship	Impact Wrestling	March 15, 2016	Defeated Matt Hardy.
18	Eli Drake	TNA King of the Mountain Championship	Impact Wrestling	April 23, 2016 (Aired May 31)	Defeated Bram.
19	Eli Drake	Impact World Tag Team Championship	Redemption	April 22, 2018	With Scott Steiner, they defeated LAX (Santana and Ortiz).
20	Petey Williams	Impact X Division Championship	Redemption	April 22, 2018	Lost to Matt Sydal.
21	Eli Drake	Impact World Championship	Impact Wrestling	April 23, 2018	Lost to Pentagón Jr..
22	Chris Bey	Impact World Tag Team Championship	Bound for Glory	October 21, 2023	With Ace Austin as ABC, they defeated The Rascalz (Zachary Wentz and Trey Miguel).
23	Crazzy Steve	Impact Digital Media Championship	Impact Wrestling	October 22, 2023 (Aired November 9)	Defeated Tommy Dreamer via disqualification.
24	Moose	TNA World Championship	Hard To Kill	January 13, 2024	Defeated Alex Shelley.
25	Trey Miguel	TNA International Championship	No Surrender	February 13, 2026	Defeated Channing "Stacks" Lorenzo.
26	Eric Young	TNA X Division Championship	Sacrifice	March 27, 2026	Lost to Leon Slater.
27	Eddie Edwards	TNA World Championship	Rebellion	April 11, 2026	Lost to Mike Santana.

=== Record ===
Championship	Wins	Losses	NTV	Total	PCT
TNA World Championship; Formerly: TNA World Heavyweight Championship, Impact World Championship	2	7	0	9	.222
TNA X Division Championship; Formerly: Impact X Division Championship	4	3	0	6	.571
TNA International Championship	1	0	0	1	1.000
TNA World Tag Team Championship; Formerly: Impact World Tag Team Championship	7	1	0	8	.875
TNA King of the Mountain Championship	1	0	0	1	1.000
Impact Digital Media Championship	0	0	1	1	.500
Total:	14	9	1	24	.604

== Race for the Case ==
Race for the Case was a similar concept used by Impact in 2017. This was a pole match where different colored briefcases hang from poles. Retrieving a briefcase allows to the participant to challenge any wrestler in any match stipulation on an Open Fight Night episode of Impact Wrestling. Inside each briefcase contained a number from one to four, which denotes the winning wrestlers placement in being able to make a challenge. Once a wrestler lays down a challenge, the other briefcase holders are no longer able to make the same challenge.

Year	Event	Date	Case	Winner	Order	Other competitors	Time
2017	Impact Wrestling	January 19	Red	Eli Drake	4	Andrew Everett, Crazzy Steve, Jessie Godderz, Kingston, Mahabali Shera, Matt Hardy, Mike Bennett, and Tyrus	13:04
2017	Impact Wrestling	January 19	Blue	Trevor Lee	3	Andrew Everett, Crazzy Steve, Jessie Godderz, Kingston, Mahabali Shera, Matt Hardy, Mike Bennett, and Tyrus	13:04
2017	Impact Wrestling	January 19	Yellow	Bram	2	Andrew Everett, Crazzy Steve, Jessie Godderz, Kingston, Mahabali Shera, Matt Hardy, Mike Bennett, and Tyrus	13:04
2017	Impact Wrestling	January 19	Green	Jeff Hardy	1	Andrew Everett, Crazzy Steve, Jessie Godderz, Kingston, Mahabali Shera, Matt Hardy, Mike Bennett, and Tyrus	13:04
2017	Challenges took place on the Open Fight Night episode of Impact Wrestling on February 2: Jeff Hardy challenged and lost to Lashley for the TNA World Heavyweight Championship.; The DCC challenged and defeated Decay in a Falls Count Anywhere match.; Trevor Lee challenged and defeated DJZ in a ladder match for the TNA X Division Championship.; Eli Drake challenged and lost to Ethan Carter III.						
