= László Németh (disambiguation) =

László Németh (1901–1975) was a Hungarian writer.

The same or a similar name has been borne by:

- László Németh (basketball) (born 1951), Hungarian basketball coach
- László Német (born 1956), Roman Catholic cardinal in Serbia
- László Németh, developer of the Hunspell software
- László Németh (weightlifter) (born 1970), Hungarian weightlifter
