= Miklós Németh (footballer) =

Hungarian footballer

Personal information
- Date of birth: 7 April 1946 (age 78)
- Place of birth: Budapest, Hungary
- Position(s): forward

Senior career*
Years	Team	Apps	(Gls)
1964–1972	Ferencváros FC	59	(27)
- *Club domestic league appearances and goals

Miklós Németh (born 7 April 1946 in Budapest) is an association football forward.

== Career ==
He earned one bronze and four silver medals in the Hungarian Football League between 1964 and 1972. He played on 105 matches in the colours of Fradi (59 champion matches, 33 international, 13 domestic fee matches) and he scored 61 goals (27 of them on championship matches and 34 other occasions).

== Honours ==
- Nemzeti Bajnokság I
  - 2.: 1965, 1966, 1970-tavasz, 1970–71
  - 3.: 1969
- Magyar Kupa (MNK)
  - winner: 1972
