= Zsolt Németh =

Zsolt Németh is the name of:

- Zsolt Németh (footballer) (born 1991), Hungarian-ethnic Slovak footballer
- Zsolt Németh (fencer) (born 1963), Hungarian fencer
- Zsolt Németh (hammer thrower) (born 1971), Hungarian hammer thrower
- Zsolt Németh (politician, 1963), Hungarian politician (Fidesz)
- Zsolt Németh (politician, 1984), Hungarian politician (Jobbik)
- Zsolt Németh (water polo), Hungarian water polo player
- Zsolt V. Németh, Hungarian politician (Fidesz)
