= Dániel Németh (photographer) =

Hungarian photographer (born 1975)

Dániel Németh (born 1975) is a Hungarian photographer who won in the Travel/Culture category of the National Geographic International Photography Contest 2006. The winning photo shows a Muslim woman with a scarf holding a child in Barcelona, Spain Feria de Abril. He was born in Budapest.
