= Charles Nemeth =

American philosopher and legal scholar (born 1951)

- Born: 1951 (age 74–75)

Education
- Education: Duquesne University (PhD), Niagara University (MS), University of Baltimore (JD), George Washington University (LLM), University of Delaware (BA)

Philosophical work
- Era: 21st-century philosophy
- Region: Western philosophy
- Institutions: Franciscan University of Steubenville
- Main interests: Ethics, Cicero, St. Thomas Aquinas

Charles P. Nemeth (born 1951) is an American philosopher and legal scholar. He is a professor and Program Director of Criminal Justice at Franciscan University of Steubenville. Nemeth is known for his works on professional ethics, homeland security and natural law.

== Books ==
- Private Security and the Law, 5th edition (CRC Press/Taylor Routledge, 2018)
- Private Security and Investigative Process, 4th edition (CRC Press, 2020)
- Private Security: Principles and Practice, 2nd edition (CRC Press, 2023)
- Criminal Law: Historical, Ethical and Philosophical Foundations, 3rd edition (CRC Press, 2023)
- Law and Evidence: A Primer for Criminal Justice, Criminology, and Legal Studies , 3rd edition (CRC Press/Taylor Francis, 2023)
- Introduction to Homeland Security: Practices and Principles, 4th edition (CRC Press, 2022).
- A Comparative Analysis of Cicero and Aquinas: Nature and the Natural Law (Bloomsbury, 2017)
- Aquinas on Crime (St. Augustine’s Press, 2010)
- Aquinas in the Courtroom (Praeger/Greenwood Press, 2001)
- Aquinas and King: A Discourse on Civil Disobedience (Carolina Academic Press, 2011)
- Cicero and Aquinas: A Comparative Study of Nature and the Natural Law (Bloomsbury Publishing, 2018).
- Natural Law and the U.S Supreme Court since Roe v. Wade (Anthem Press, 2020)
- Happiness in a Complex World: Rules from Aristotle and Aquinas (Anthem Press, 2020 and Sophia Institute Press, 2023)
- Casebook on Forensic Law (Routledge/Taylor/Francis, 2024)
