= Ferenc Németh =

Ferenc Németh may refer to:

- Ferenc Németh (pentathlete), Hungarian modern pentathlete
- Ferenc Németh (basketball), Hungarian-French basketball player
- Ferenc Németh (cross-country skier), Hungarian cross-country skier
- Ferenc Nemeth (musician), Hungarian jazz drummer and composer
