= Elizabeta Nemeth =

American physiologist

Elizabeta Nemeth is an American physiologist who has made many contributions to the understanding of inflammatory disorders, thalassemias, and iron overload diseases.

== Biography ==
Nemeth obtained her degree in molecular biology and physiology from the University of Belgrade and then earned a neuroscience degree from the University of Hawaii in 1998. She did postdoctoral research in the area of ovarian cancer and later worked at the Cedars-Sinai Medical Center in Los Angeles, California. In 2001, she became a member of the Department of Medicine at UCLA, where she worked on iron metabolism and the hormone hepcidin. In 2007, the American College of Nutrition honored her with the Grace Goldsmith Award. Currently she is a co-founder of Intrinsic LifeSciences, and is an associate professor at the UCLA Center for Iron Disorders. Her research has suggested treatments for anemia and iron overload.
