= Ryan Nemeth =

American professional wrestler (born 1984)

Personal information
- Born: November 4, 1984 (age 42) Cleveland, Ohio, U.S.
- Relative: Nic Nemeth (brother)

Professional wrestling career
- Ring name(s): Briley Pierce; Hot Young Briley; Ryan Nemeth
- Billed height: 6 ft 1 in (1.85 m)
- Billed weight: 214 lb (97 kg)
- Billed from: Hollywood, California; Springfield, Rhode Island
- Trained by: Rip Rogers; Ohio Valley Wrestling; Florida Championship Wrestling
- Debut: 2010

Ryan Nemeth (born November 4, 1984) is an American professional wrestler. He is signed to Total Nonstop Action Wrestling (TNA), where he is one-half of The Nemeths and the current TNA World Tag Team Champions alongside his brother Nic Nemeth in their second reign.

Prior to joining TNA, he performed for All Elite Wrestling (AEW) and its sister promotion Ring of Honor (ROH), and WWE, performing on its then-developmental brand Florida Championship Wrestling (FCW) and current brand NXT under the ring name Briley Pierce.

== Professional wrestling career ==
=== Ohio Valley Wrestling (2010–2011) ===
Nemeth won the promotion's first ever Breakout competition and received a one-year paid scholarship with Ohio Valley Wrestling (OVW). In 2010, Nemeth made his professional debut for OVW under his real name. On January 8, 2011, Nemeth and Christopher Silvio defeated The Elite (Ted McNaler and Adam Revolver) to win the OVW Southern Tag Team Championship in Louisville, Kentucky.

On February 2, 2011, after Nemeth was attacked by Fighting Spirit (Silvio and Raphael Constantine), Jim Cornette vacated the titles. On the same night, Nemeth and Paredyse defeated Fighting Spirit in a tag team elimination match to win the vacated Tag Team Championship. On March 5, 2011, Nemeth and Paredyse lost the Tag Team Championship to Silvio and Constantine.

=== WWE (2011–2013) ===
==== Florida Championship Wrestling (2011–2012) ====
Nemeth signed a developmental contract with World Wrestling Entertainment and was assigned to its developmental territory Florida Championship Wrestling (FCW). He made his debut on June 26, 2011 as Briley Pierce, facing Big E Langston in a losing effort. On the October 30, 2011, episode of FCW Television Pierce was defeated by Brad Maddox after being pinned with the Oklahoma roll. On November 3, 2011, Pierce and Brad Maddox defeated C.J. Parker and Donnie Marlow to win the FCW Florida Tag Team Championships. On February 2, 2012, Pierce and Maddox were forced to vacate the titles due to Pierce suffering a leg injury. Bo Rotundo and Husky Harris defeated Maddox and Eli Cottonwood for the vacant titles that night.

==== NXT (2012–2013) ====
Before WWE, NXT merged with FCW as NXT Wrestling. Nemeth, as Briley Pierce, debuted on the June 20, 2012, episode of NXT taped at Full Sail University as an interviewer.

Pierce made his in-ring debut on the May 8 episode of NXT against Sakamoto, but both men were attacked by Conor O'Brian; this led to both men challenging O'Brian to a handicap match during the next episode, which O'Brian won. On May 17, 2013, Pierce was released; his last match was a battle royal on the May 29 episode of NXT (which was taped before his release) to determine the #1 contender for the NXT Championship where he and Sakamoto were the first men eliminated from the match by Mason Ryan.

=== Independent circuit (2013–present) ===
Nemeth had his first match after his WWE release on May 25, 2013, at Florida Underground Wrestling Throwdown 3, defeating Jesse Neal. On June 23, 2016 Nemeth won the DDT Ironman Heavymetalweight Championship, defeating Bunny the Cat by forfeit. He would lose the title on the same day to Taya Valkyrie.

In 2020, Nemeth was cast in the ultimately-abandoned 4th season of the Netflix dramedy GLOW as a character named Tony Maroni.

=== All Elite Wrestling / Ring of Honor (2021–2023) ===
Nemeth made his All Elite Wrestling debut on the January 27, 2021 episode of AEW Dynamite in a losing effort against Hangman Page. On the February 9 episode of AEW Dark, Nemeth earned his first victory in AEW when he defeated Marko Stunt establishing himself as a heel. The following night on Dynamite, Nemeth was defeated by Pac. On the February 23 episode of AEW Dark, Nemeth defeated Aaron Solo and aligned himself with Peter Avalon and Cezar Bononi.

Nemeth made his Ring of Honor debut on the May 18, 2023 episode of Ring of Honor Wrestling, teaming with Avalon in a losing effort against the Iron Savages (Boulder and Bronson).

On February 14, 2025, Nemeth filed a lawsuit against AEW, AEW president Tony Khan and former AEW wrestler CM Punk for assault, breach of contract, breach of implied covenant of good faith and fair dealing and intentional interference with prospective advantage.

=== Total Nonstop Action Wrestling (2024–present) ===
In 2024, Nemeth began making appearances in Total Nonstop Action Wrestling (TNA) as a face, which was around the same time his brother Nic Nemeth signed with the company. Along with TNA, Ryan also appeared alongside Nic in TNA's partner promotion New Japan Pro-Wrestling (NJPW).

On March 14, 2025, at Sacrifice, Nic and Ryan locked themselves in the steel cage with Matt Hardy, proceeding to beat him down and cut his head open while preventing Nic and Hardy's teammates from stopping them. The Nemeths would then go on to win the titles from the Hardys a month later at Rebellion.

== Personal life ==
Nemeth is of Hungarian descent and is the second of three sons; his older brother Nic is also a professional wrestler, who previously performed for WWE under the ring name Dolph Ziggler. His other brother, Donald, was sentenced to fifteen years in prison after pleading guilty to involuntary manslaughter, kidnapping, and robbery for his role in a botched robbery attempt that led to the murder of a former Marine in January 2016.

== Championships and accomplishments ==
- DDT Pro-Wrestling
  - Ironman Heavymetalweight Championship (1 time)
- Florida Championship Wrestling
  - FCW Florida Tag Team Championship (1 time) – with Brad Maddox
- Ohio Valley Wrestling
  - OVW Southern Tag Team Championship (2 times) – with Christopher Silvio (1) and Paredyse (1)
- Pro Wrestling Illustrated
  - Ranked No. 491 of the top 500 singles wrestlers in the PWI 500 in 2021
- Total Nonstop Action Wrestling
  - TNA World Tag Team Championship (2 times, current) – with Nic Nemeth
