= TNA Year End Awards =

Award ceremony held by TNA Wrestling

- Country: United States
- Presented by: TNA Wrestling
- First award: 2003–2007; 2018–present

The TNA Year End Awards (formerly known as Impact Year End Awards from 2018 to 2023) is a concept used by TNA Wrestling, formerly known as Impact Wrestling, where awards, similar to the Academy and Grammy Awards, are given to professional wrestlers and other individuals within Impact Wrestling, such as commentators and managers.

== Total Nonstop Action Wrestling era ==
=== 2003 TNA Year End Awards ===
The award winners were announced during a Weekly Pay-per view show. The winners were announced by Mike Tenay in the ring.

| Mr. TNA: A.J. Styles | Babe of the Year: Trinity |
| Tag Team of the Year: America's Most Wanted (Chris Harris and James Storm) | X Division Star of the Year: Michael Shane |
| Match of the Year: Chris Sabin vs. Frankie Kazarian vs. Michael Shane in the first ever Ultimate X match | Who to Watch in 2004: Abyss |
| Memorable Moment of the Year: Jeff Jarrett attacks Hulk Hogan in Japan | Finisher of the Year: The Styles Clash (Belly-to Belly inverted mat slam) |

=== 2004 TNA Year End Awards ===
The award winners were announced during a Weekly Pay-per view show. The winners were announced by Mike Tenay in the ring.

| Mr. TNA: A.J. Styles | Babe of the Year: Traci Brooks |
| Tag Team of the Year: America's Most Wanted (Chris Harris and James Storm) | X Division Star of the Year: A.J. Styles |
| Match of the Year: Six Sides of Steel Match: America's Most Wanted (Chris Harris and James Storm) vs. Triple X (Christopher Daniels and Elix Skipper) at Turning Point | Who to Watch in 2005: Héctor Garza |
| Memorable Moment of the Year: Primetime walks the Six Sides of Steel at Turning Point | Finisher of the Year: The Canadian Destroyer (Flip piledriver) |

=== 2005 TNA Year End Awards ===
The award winners were announced on the January 14, 2006 episode of TNA iMPACT!. The winners were shown in a video package.

| Mr. TNA: A.J. Styles | Knockout of the Year: Jackie Gayda |
| Tag Team of the Year: Team 3D (Brother Devon and Brother Ray) | X Division Star of the Year: A.J. Styles |
| Match of the Year: Barbed Wire Massacre: Abyss vs. Sabu at Turning Point | Feud of the Year: A.J. Styles and Christopher Daniels |
| Who to Watch in 2006: Christian Cage | Memorable Moment of the Year: Christian Cage debuts at Genesis |
Finisher of the Year: The Canadian Destroyer (Flip piledriver)

=== 2006 TNA Year End Awards ===
The award winners were announced on the December 27, 2006 episode of TNA iMPACT!. The winners were shown in a video package.

| Mr. TNA: Samoa Joe | Knockout of the Year: Christy Hemme |
| Tag Team of the Year: A.J. Styles and Christopher Daniels | X Division Star of the Year: Samoa Joe |
| Match of the Year: Ultimate X Match: A.J. Styles and Christopher Daniels vs. The Latin American Xchange (Hernandez and Homicide) at No Surrender | Feud of the Year: Kurt Angle vs. Samoa Joe |
| Who to Watch in 2007: Kurt Angle | Memorable Moment of the Year: Kurt Angle debuts at No Surrender |
| Most Inspirational Wrestler of the Year: Eric Young | Finisher of the Year: The Canadian Destroyer |

=== 2007 TNA Year End Awards ===
The award winners were announced on the January 28, 2008 episode of TNA iMPACT!. The winners were shown in a video package.

| Mr. TNA: Samoa Joe; Christian Cage; Kurt Angle | Knockout of the Year: Gail Kim; Christy Hemme; Traci Brooks |
| Tag Team of the Year: The Motor City Machine Guns (Alex Shelley and Chris Sabin); A.J. Styles and Tomko; The Latin American Xchange (Hernandez and Homicide) | X Division Star of the Year: Jay Lethal; Chris Sabin; Kaz |
| Match of the Year: Sting vs. Kurt Angle at Bound for Glory; Ultimate X Match: The Latin American Xchange vs. Triple X at Bound for Glory; Ladder Match: Kaz vs. Christian Cage at Genesis | Feud of the Year: Kurt Angle vs. Samoa Joe; Kurt Angle vs. Sting; Christian Cage vs. Samoa Joe |
| Who to Watch in 2008: Booker T; Judas Mesias; Kaz | Memorable Moment of the Year: Booker T debuts in TNA; Kurt Angle becomes TNA Triple Crown Champion; Sting regains the TNA World Heavyweight Championship |
| Most Inspirational Wrestler of the Year: Sting; Eric Young; Jeff Jarrett | Finisher of the Year: The Muscle Buster; The Flux Capacitor; Gringo Killer |

=== 2014 TNA Year End Awards ===
The award winners were announced on the January 7, 2015 episode of TNA iMPACT!. The winners were shown in a video package.

| Mr. TNA: Bobby Roode | Knockout of the Year: Taryn Terrell |
| Tag Team of the Year: The Wolves (Davey Richards and Eddie Edwards) | Breakout Star of the Year: Bram |
| Match of the Year: The Wolves vs. The Hardy Boyz vs. Team 3D on October 8 | Feud of the Year: Bully Ray vs. Dixie Carter |
| Best Comeback Moment of the Year: Matt Hardy's Return Match Against Magnus | Memorable Moment of the Year: Bully Ray Gives a Table Powerbomb to Dixie Carter |
Most Inspirational Wrestler of the Year: Crazzy Steve

=== 2024 TNA Year End Awards ===
The award winners were announced on the December 19 and 26, 2024, episodes of TNA iMPACT!.

| Male Wrestler of the Year: Joe Hendry; Eric Young; Frankie Kazarian; Josh Alexander; Mike Santana; Moose; Nic Nemeth; Steve Maclin | Knockout of the Year: Jordynne Grace; Ash by Elegance; Masha Slamovich; Rosemary; Steph De Lander; Tasha Steelz; Xia Brookside |
| Tag Team of the Year: ABC (Ace Austin and Chris Bey); Fir$t Cla$$ (A. J. Francis and KC Navarro); Speedball Mountain (Mike Bailey and Trent Seven); The Good Hands (John Skyler and Jason Hotch); The Hardys (Matt Hardy and Jeff Hardy); The Rascalz (Trey Miguel and Zachary Wentz); The System (Brian Myers and Eddie Edwards) | Knockouts Tag Team of the Year: Spitfire (Dani Luna and Jody Threat); The Elegance Brand (Ash by Elegance and Heather by Elegance); Decay (Rosemary and Havok); The Malisha (Alisha Edwards and Masha Slamovich); MK Ultra (Masha Slamovich and Killer Kelly) |
| X Division Star of the Year: Mustafa Ali; Kushida; Laredo Kid; Leon Slater; Mike Bailey; Zachary Wentz | One to Watch in 2025: Leon Slater; Jake Something; Jason Hotch; Sinner and Saint (Judas Icarus and Travis Williams); KC Navarro; Léi Yǐng Lee; Xia Brookside |
| Moment of the Year: Joe Hendry Goes Viral; Nic Nemeth Debuts in TNA; The Hardys Return and Resurgence in TNA; The System Takes Over; TNA Revival at Hard To Kill | Match of the Year: Jordynne Grace vs. Masha Slamovich at Bound for Glory; Chris Sabin vs. El Hijo del Vikingo vs. Kushida at Hard To Kill; Trinity vs. Jordynne Grace at Hard To Kill; Josh Alexander vs. Will Ospreay on TNA Impact! (January 18); Kazuchika Okada and Motor City Machine Guns vs. The System on TNA Impact! (January 25); ABC vs. Grizzled Young Vets at No Surrender; Jordynne Grace vs. Gisele Shaw at No Surrender; Chris Sabin vs. Mustafa Ali at No Surrender; Steve Maclin vs. Nic Nemeth at Sacrifice; Alex Shelley vs. Nic Nemeth on TNA Impact! (April 4); Hammerstone vs. Josh Alexander at Rebellion; Jordynne Grace vs. Miyu Yamashita on TNA Impact! (May 2); Mustafa Ali vs. Ace Austin at Under Siege; Mustafa Ali vs. Mike Bailey at Slammiversary; Jonathan Gresham vs. Charlie Dempsey on TNA Impact! (August 22); Jordynne Grace vs. Ash by Elegance on TNA Impact! (August 29); Nic Nemeth vs. Josh Alexander at Emergence; Zachary Wentz vs. Mike Bailey at Victory Road; Joe Hendry vs. Josh Alexander at Victory Road; Mike Santana vs. JDC on TNA Impact! (September 19); Mike Bailey vs. Leon Slater on TNA Impact! (October 17); Mike Bailey vs. El Hijo del Vikingo at Bound for Glory; ABC vs. The System vs. The Hardys at Bound for Glory; Mike Bailey vs. Moose on TNA Impact! (November 7); Steve Maclin vs. Josh Alexander at Turning Point |

=== 2025 TNA Year End Awards ===
The award winners were announced on the December 25, 2025 episode of TNA iMPACT!.

| Male Wrestler of the Year: Mike Santana; Joe Hendry; Moose; Mustafa Ali | Knockout of the Year: Ash by Elegance; Tessa Blanchard; Léi Ying Lee; Kelani Jordan |
| Tag Team of the Year: The Hardys (Jeff Hardy and Matt Hardy); The Nemeths (Nic Nemeth and Ryan Nemeth); The Rascalz (Trey Miguel and Zachary Wentz); The Great Hands (John Skyler and Jason Hotch) | Knockouts Tag Team of the Year: The Elegance Brand (Ash by Elegance, Heather by Elegance, M by Elegance, and The Personal Concierge); The IInspiration (Cassie Lee and Jessie McKay); Spitfire (Dani Luna and Jody Threat); The Angel Warriors (Xia Brookside and Léi Ying Lee) |
| X-Division Star of the Year: Leon Slater; Moose; Myron Reed; Cedric Alexander | Faction of the Year: The System; Order 4; The Elegance Brand; Fir$st Cla$$ |
| Inspirational Wrestler of the Year: Chris Bey | Finishing Move of the Year: Swanton 450° (Leon Slater); Spin the Block (Mike Santana); Trick Shot (Trick Williams) |
| Moment of the Year: AJ Styles Appears at Slammiversary; Joe Hendry wins the TNA World Championship at Genesis; Leon Slater's Swanton 450° off Ultimate X at Rebellion; The Hardys vs. Team 3D in "One Final Table" at Bound for Glory | Crossover Moment of the Year: Joe Hendry vs. Randy Orton at WrestleMania 41; Trick Williams wins the TNA World Championship at NXT Battleground; NXT vs. TNA Showdown; Moose, Joe Hendry, and The Nemeths at Triplemanía Regia III |
Match of the Year: Mike Santana vs. Mustafa Ali at Rebellion; Jordynne Grace vs. Tessa Blanchard at Genesis; Mance Warner vs. Sami Callihan at Unbreakable; The Elegance Brand vs. Spitfire at Under Siege; Mike Santana vs. A. J. Francis on TNA Impact! (June 26); Moose vs. Leon Slater at Slammiversary; Leon Slater vs. Myron Reed at Victory Road; Frankie Kazarian vs. Steve Maclin at Bound for Glory; Leon Slater vs. Je'Von Evans at Bound for Glory; The Hardys vs. Team 3D at Bound for Glory

== Impact Wrestling era ==
=== 2018 Impact Best of 2018 Fans' Choice Awards ===
The award winners were announced on Impact Wrestling's Twitch channel on the Impact Best of 2018 Fans' Choice Awards Reveal, with Alicia Atout and Anthony Carelli, Behind the Lights Episode 34 stream.

| Wrestler of the Year: Sami Callihan; Austin Aries; Brian Cage; Eddie Edwards; Eli Drake; Fénix; Johnny Impact; Matt Sydal; Moose; Pentagón Jr. | Knockout of the Year: Tessa Blanchard; Alisha Edwards; Allie; Jordynne Grace; Katarina; Kiera Hogan; Rosemary; Scarlett Bordeaux; Su Yung; Taya Valkyrie |
| Tag Team of the Year: The Latin American Xchange (Ortiz and Santana); Cult of Lee (Trevor Lee and Caleb Konley); Desi Hit Squad (Rohit Raju and Raj Singh); Eli Drake and Scott Steiner; Ethan Page and Matt Sydal; Fallah Bahh and KM; Grado and Joe Hendry; The Lucha Bros (Fénix and Pentagón Jr.); Ohio Versus Everything (Dave Crist and Jake Crist); The OGz (Hernandez and Homicide); The Rascalz (Dezmond Xavier and Zachary Wentz); Rich Swann and Willie Mack; Z&E (Andrew Everett and DJZ) | X Division Star of the Year: Brian Cage; Andrew Everett; Dezmond Xavier; DJZ; Fénix; Matt Sydal; Petey Williams; Rich Swann; Taiji Ishimori; Trevor Lee |
| Moment of the Year: Sami Callihan destroys Eddie Edwards' face with a baseball bat – Impact, March 1; Barbed Wire Massacre 3 – Impact, January 18; Austin Aries returns and wins Impact World Championship – Impact, February 1; Abyss returns to face Kongo Kong – Impact, March 15; Scott Steiner returns to be Eli Drake's tag team partner – Impact, April 12; Su Yung's Funeral of Fire for Rosemary – Impact, May 17; Pentagón Jr. wins Impact World Championship – Redemption, April 22; Tommy Dreamer passes his cane to Eddie Edwards – Slammiversary, July 22; Pentagón Jr. shaves Sami Callihan's head – Slammiversary, July 22; Moose betrays Eddie Edwards – Impact: Under Pressure, August 30; Tessa Blanchard wins Impact Knockouts Championship – Impact: Under Pressure, August 30; Johnny Impact wins Impact World Championship – Bound for Glory, October 14; Evil Allie emerges – Impact, November 15; Gail Kim returns to stop Tessa Blanchard – Impact, November 29 | Finisher of the Year: Pentagon Driver (Pentagón Jr.); Buzzsaw (Tessa Blanchard); Cactus Driver 97 (Sami Callihan); Canadian Destroyer (Petey Williams); Doomsday Saito (Killer Kross); Gravy Train (Eli Drake); Hot Fire Flame (The Rascalz (Dezmond Xavier and Zachary Wentz)); No Jackhammer Needed Spear (Moose); Starship Pain (Johnny Impact) |
One to Watch in 2019: Killer Kross; Desi Hit Squad (Raj Singh and Rohit Raju); Ethan Page; Jordynne Grace; Kiera Hogan; The Rascalz (Dezmond Xavier, Zachary Wentz and Trey Miguel); Willie Mack

=== 2019 Impact Wrestling Awards ===
The award winners were announced on the December 28, 2019, and January 4, 2020, episode of Impact!, as well on Impact Wrestling's website.

| Wrestler of the Year: Tessa Blanchard; Brian Cage; Eddie Edwards; Johnny Impact; Michael Elgin; Moose; Rhino; Rich Swann; Rob Van Dam; Sami Callihan | Knockout of the Year: Taya Valkyrie; Alisha Edwards; Havok; Kiera Hogan; Madison Rayne; Rosemary; Su Yung; Tenille Dashwood |
| Tag Team of the Year: The North (Ethan Page and Josh Alexander); The Deaners (Cody Deaner and Cousin Jake); The Desi Hit Squad (Rohit Raju, Raj Singh, and Mahabali Shera); The Latin American Xchange (Ortiz and Santana); Madison Rayne and Kiera Hogan; oVe (Dave Crist and Jake Crist); The Rascalz (Dez, Trey and Wentz); TJP and Fallah Bahh; Willie Mack and Rich Swann | X Division Star of the Year: Rich Swann; Ace Austin; Daga; Jake Crist; Petey Williams; TJP; Trey |
| Match of the Year: Tessa Blanchard vs. Sami Callihan At Slammiversary XVII; The Lucha Bros vs. Brian Cage and Johnny Impact – Impact, January 3; Rich Swann vs. Ethan Page vs. Jake Crist vs. Trey – Impact Wrestling Homecoming, January 6; Latin American Xchange vs. The Lucha Bros – Impact Wrestling Homecoming, January 6; Johnny Impact vs. Brian Cage – Impact Wrestling Homecoming, January 6; Latin American Xchange vs. The Lucha Bros – Impact, February 8; Taya Valkyrie vs. Tessa Blanchard – Impact Uncaged, February 15; Team AAA vs. Team Impact – Impact Uncaged, February 15; Jordynne Grace vs. Tessa Blanchard – Impact, March 15; Brian Cage and Latin American Xchange vs. Johnny Impact and The Lucha Bros – Impact, April 26; Rich Swann vs. Sami Callihan – Rebellion, April 28; Gail Kim vs. Tessa Blanchard – Rebellion, April 28; Johnny Impact vs. Brian Cage – Rebellion, April 28; Latin American Xchange vs. The Lucha Bros – Rebellion, April 28; Tommy Dreamer, Willie Mack, Rich Swann, and Fallah Bahh vs. oVe – Impact, May 10; Rich Swann vs. Michael Elgin – Impact, May 17; The Rascalz vs. Latin American Xchange – Impact, June 7; The Rascalz vs. Latin American Xchange and Laredo Kid – Impact, June 28; Taya Valkyrie vs. Su Yung vs. Havok vs. Rosemary – Slammiversary XVII, July 7; Rich Swann vs. Johnny Impact – Slammiversary XVII, July 7; Brian Cage vs. Michael Elgin – Slammiversary XVII, July 7; Jake Crist vs. Rich Swann – Impact, July 26; Michael Elgin vs. Eddie Edwards – Impact Wrestling Unbreakable, August 2; The North vs. The Rascalz – Impact, August 2; The North vs. Latin American Xchange – Impact, September 6; Michael Elgin vs. TJP – Victory Road, September 14; Rich Swann and Willie Mack vs. Latin American Xchange – Impact, September 20; Taya Valkyrie vs. Tenille Dashwood – Bound for Glory, October 20; The North vs. Willie Mack and Rich Swann vs. Rob Van Dan and Rhino – Bound for Glory, October 20; Michael Elgin vs. Naomichi Marufuji – Bound for Glory, October 20; Ace Austin vs. Jake Crist vs. Acey Romero vs. Tessa Blanchard vs. Daga – Bound for Glory, October 20; Brian Cage vs. Sami Callihan – Bound for Glory, October 20; Ace Austin vs. Eddie Edwards – Impact, October 29; Michael Elgin vs. Fallah Bahh – Impact, November 5; The North vs. Eddie Edwards and Naomichi Marufuji – Impact, November 12; Elimination Challenge – Impact, November 19 | Moment of the Year: Sami Callihan wins World Title on AXS TV debut – Impact, October 29; Johnny Impact betrays Brian Cage – Impact, March 15; Allie dies in the Undead Realm – Impact, March 29; Ace Austin leaps off of Ultimate X – Impact Wrestling United We Stand, April 4; Petey Williams hits Jake Crist with a Super Canadian Destroyer – Impact, April 5; Brian Cage wins Impact World Championship – Rebellion, April 28; Michael Elgin debuts – Rebellion, April 28; Rob Van Dam makes his Impact return – Impact, May 3; The Great Muta competes at A Night You Can't Mist – Impact Wrestling A Night You Can't Mist, June 8; Brian Cage F5s Dr. Ariel – Impact, June 28; Michael Elgin powerbombs Brian Cage through a table on the outside, destroys Don Callis – Impact, June 28; Tenille Dashwood debuts in Impact – Impact, August 30; Havok hangs Su Yung, Su returns as Susie – Impact, September 20; Sami Callihan hits Melissa Santos with a bottle – Impact, September 27; Acey Romero crashes off a ladder through a table on the floor – Bound for Glory, October 20; Joey Ryan flips Ken Shamrock – Impact, November 5; Alisha Edwards finally gets revenge on Ace Austin, canes him in hotel – Impact, November 5; Taya Valkyrie breaks record for longest Knockouts title reign |
| Finishing Move of the Year: Magnum (Tessa Blanchard); 5 Star Frog Splash (Rob Van Dam); Cactus Driver '97 (Sami Callihan); Canadian Destroyer (Petey Williams); Drill Claw (Brian Cage); Elgin Bomb (Michael Elgin); Gore (Rhino); Hot Fire Flame (The Rascalz); No Jackhammer Needed Spear (Moose); Road to Valhalla (Taya Valkyrie) | One to Watch in 2020: Willie Mack; Acey Romero; Daga; The Deaners; Desi Hit Squad; Fallah Bahh; Kiera Hogan; Madman Fulton; The Rascalz; Trey |

=== 2020 Impact Wrestling Awards ===
The award winners were announced on the December 22 and 30, 2020, episode of Impact!, and on Impact Wrestling's social media.

| Wrestler of the Year: Deonna Purrazzo; Ace Austin; Brian Myers; Chris Bey; Eddie Edwards; Eric Young; Jordynne Grace; Ken Shamrock; Moose; Rhino; Rich Swann; Sami Callihan; Taya Valkyrie; Willie Mack | Knockout of the Year: Deonna Purrazzo; Alisha Edwards; Havok; Jordynne Grace; Kiera Hogan; Kimber Lee; Nevaeh; Rosemary; Su Yung; Tasha Steelz; Taya Valkyrie; Tenille Dashwood |
| Tag Team of the Year: The North (Ethan Page and Josh Alexander) | X Division Star of the Year: Ace Austin; Chris Bey; Rohit Raju; Suicide; TJP; Trey Miguel; Willie Mack |
| Match of the Year: Eddie Edwards vs. Ace Austin vs. Trey vs. Eric Young vs. Rich Swann at Slammiversary; TJP vs. El Hijo del Vikingo on Impact!; Tessa Blanchard vs. Sami Callihan at Hard to Kill; TJP vs. Josh Alexander on Impact!; Willie Mack vs. Ace Austin at Rebellion Night 1; Deonna Purrazzo vs. Jordynne Grace at Slammiversary; Motor City Machine Guns vs. The North; Deonna Purrazzo vs. Jordynne Grace at Emergence Night 2; The Motor City Machine Guns vs. The Rascalz on Impact!; Josh Alexander vs. Alex Shelley vs. Ace Austin vs. Karl Anderson at Victory Road 2020; Eric Young vs. Eddie Edwards at Victory Road 2020; The North vs. Motor City Machine Guns vs. The Good Brothers vs. Ace Austin and Madman Fulton at Bound for Glory; Eric Young vs. Rich Swann at Bound for Glory; The Good Brothers vs. The North at Turning Point; Deonna Purrazzo vs. Su Yung at Turning Point; Rich Swann vs. Sami Callihan at Turning Point | Moment of the Year: The debuts and returns at Slammiversary; Tessa Blanchard becomes first woman to win world championship; Jordynne Grace ends Taya Valkyrie's record breaking title reign; Taya Valkyrie and Tessa Blanchard make history in first all female world title match; Sami Callihan revealed as ICU, throws fireball at Ken Shamrock; TNA returns for one night AXS TV special; Willie Mack becomes X Division Champion; Deonna Purrazzo debuts attacking Jordynne Grace; Eddie Edwards becomes Impact World Champion for a second time; Motor City Machine Guns become Impact World Tag Team Champions for a second time; Eric Young attacks Rich Swann after Swann announces retirement; Rohit Raju shocks Chris Bey to become X Division Champion; Eric Young becomes Impact World Champion for a second time; Sami Callihan piledrives Katie Forbes; James Storm returns in Call Your Shot Gauntlet; Rich Swann becomes World Champion; Ken Shamrock inducted into Impact Hall of Fame by The Rock, Mick Foley, Bret Hart, and more; John E. Bravo shot at end of wedding to Rosemary; The Good Brothers become Impact World Tag Team Champions; The Rascalz bid farewell to Impact Wrestling |
| Finishing Move of the Year: Magic Killer (The Good Brothers - Karl Anderson and Doc Gallows) | One to Watch in 2021: Chris Bey; Fallah Bahh; Joe Doering; Kimber Lee; Madman Fulton; Tasha Steelz and Kiera Hogan; The Deaners (Cody Deaner and Cousin Jake); XXXL (Acey Romero and Larry D) |

=== 2021 Impact Wrestling Awards ===
The award winners were announced on the December 23 and 30, 2021, episode of Impact!.

| Men's Wrestler of the Year: Josh Alexander; Christian Cage; Kenny Omega; Moose; Rich Swann | Knockout of the Year: Deonna Purrazzo; Jordynne Grace; Mercedes Martinez; Mickie James; Tasha Steelz |
| Men's Tag Team of the Year: The Good Brothers (Doc Gallows and Karl Anderson); Bullet Club (Chris Bey and Hikuleo); FinJuice (David Finlay and Juice Robinson); Rich Swann and Willie Mack; Violent By Design (Eric Young, Deaner, and Joe Doering) | Knockouts Tag Team of the Year: Jordynne Grace and Rachael Ellering; Decay (Havok and Rosemary); Fire 'N Flava (Kiera Hogan and Tasha Steelz); The IInspiration (Cassie Lee and Jessie McKay); The Influence (Madison Rayne and Tenille Dashwood) |
| Men's Match of the Year: Josh Alexander vs. TJP on BTI (June 3); Christian Cage vs. Josh Alexander at Bound for Glory; Josh Alexander vs. Ace Austin vs. Chris Bey vs. Petey Williams vs. Rohit Raju vs. Trey Miguel at Slammiversary; Kenny Omega vs. Sami Callihan at Slammiversary; Rich Swann vs. Kenny Omega at Rebellion; Rich Swann vs. Moose at Sacrifice | Knockouts Match of the Year: Deonna Purrazzo vs. Mickie James at Bound for Glory; Deonna Purrazzo vs. Masha Slamovich at Knockouts Knockdown; Deonna Purrazzo vs. Thunder Rosa at Slammiversary; Fire 'N Flava vs. Havok and Nevaeh at Hard To Kill; Jordynne Grace vs. Tasha Steelz on BTI; Mercedes Martinez vs. Tasha Steelz at Knockouts Knockdown |

=== 2022 Impact Wrestling Awards ===
The award winners were announced on the December 29, 2022, episode of Impact!.

| Male Wrestler of the Year: Josh Alexander; Eddie Edwards; Eric Young; Matt Cardona; Moose; Rich Swann; Sami Callihan; Steve Maclin | Knockout of the Year: Jordynne Grace; Deonna Purrazzo; Gisele Shaw; Killer Kelly; Masha Slamovich; Mia Yim; Mickie James; Tasha Steelz |
| Men's Tag Team of the Year: The Motor City Machine Guns (Alex Shelley and Chris Sabin); Ace Austin and Chris Bey; The Briscoes (Jay Briscoe and Mark Briscoe); The Good Brothers (Doc Gallows and Karl Anderson); Heath and Rhino; The Kingdom (Matt Taven and Mike Bennett); The Major Players (Brian Myers and Matt Cardona); Violent By Design (Eric Young, Deaner, and Joe Doering) | Knockouts Tag Team of the Year: The Death Dollz (Jessicka, Rosemary, and Taya Valkyrie); The Influence (Madison Rayne and Tenille Dashwood); The IInspiration (Cassie Lee and Jessie McKay); Savannah Evans and Tasha Steelz; VXT (Chelsea Green and Deonna Purrazzo) |
| X Division Star of the Year: Mike Bailey; Ace Austin; Black Taurus; Chris Bey; Kenny King; Laredo Kid; Trey Miguel; Yuya Uemura | Match of the Year: Josh Alexander vs. Mike Bailey on Impact! (December 8); Jonathan Gresham vs. Chris Sabin at Hard To Kill; Mickie James vs. Deonna Purrazzo at Hard To Kill; The Good Brothers (Doc Gallows and Karl Anderson) vs. Guerrillas of Destiny (Tama Tonga and Tanga Loa) at No Surrender; Alex Shelley vs. Jay White at Sacrifice; Jonah vs. PCO at Sacrifice; Trey Miguel vs. Jake Something at Sacrifice; Chris Sabin vs. Jay White at Multiverse of Matches; Moose vs. Josh Alexander at Rebellion; Ace Austin vs. Mike Bailey vs. Trey Miguel at Rebellion; Josh Alexander vs. Tomohiro Ishii at Under Siege; Josh Alexander vs. Eric Young at Slammiversary; Queen of the Mountain match at Slammiversary; Chris Sabin vs. Frankie Kazarian on Impact! (June 20); Mike Bailey vs. Trey Miguel at Against All Odds; Deonna Purrazzo vs. Mia Yim on Impact! (July 7); Alex Shelley vs. Chris Sabin on Impact! (July 21); Jordynne Grace vs. Mia Yim at Emergence; Josh Alexander vs. Alex Shelley at Emergence; Moose vs. Sami Callihan vs. Steve Maclin at Victory Road; Mike Bailey vs. Frankie Kazarian at Bound for Glory; Jordynne Grace vs. Masha Slamovich at Bound for Glory; Josh Alexander vs. Eddie Edwards at Bound for Glory; Jordynne Grace vs. Gisele Shaw on Impact! (November 10); Josh Alexander vs. Frankie Kazarian at Over Drive |
| Moment of the Year: Josh Alexander wins the Impact World Championship from Moose at Rebellion; Tasha Steelz wins first Knockouts Ultimate X at Hard To Kill; Jay White ejects Guerrillas of Destiny (Tama Tonga and Tanga Loa) from Bullet Club at No Surrender; Jordynne Grace wins first Queen of the Mountain match at Slammiversary; Team Impact unite to beat Honor No More at Slammiversary; America's Most Wanted (Chris Harris and James Storm) return to Impact ring for first time in 16 years at Against All Odds; Doc Gallows slams PCO through the ring on Impact! (August 4); Mickie James emotionally announces The Last Rodeo on Impact! (September 2); Bully Ray returns in Call Your Shot Gauntlet at Bound for Glory; Heath and Rhino fulfil promise to become the Impact World Tag Team Champions on Impact! (October 20) | One to Watch in 2023: Bhupinder Gujjar; Black Taurus; Gisele Shaw; Jai Vidal; Jason Hotch; Killer Kelly; Laredo Kid; Yuya Uemura |

=== 2023 Impact Wrestling Awards ===
The award winners were announced on the December 21 and 28, 2023, episodes of Impact!.

| Male Wrestler of the Year: Alex Shelley; Bully Ray; Eddie Edwards; Eric Young; Frankie Kazarian; Joe Hendry; Jonathan Gresham; Josh Alexander; Moose; PCO; Rich Swann; Steve Maclin | Knockout of the Year: Trinity; Alisha Edwards; Dani Luna; Deonna Purrazzo; Gisele Shaw; Killer Kelly; KiLynn King; Masha Slamovich; Mickie James; Jody Threat; Jordynne Grace; Tasha Steelz |
| One to Watch in 2024: KiLynn King; Jody Threat; Jake Something; Jai Vidal; Leon Slater; Alan Angels; Bhupinder Gujjar; Sheldon Jean | Male Tag Team of the Year: ABC (Chris Bey & Ace Austin); Kenny King & Sheldon Jean; The Motor City Machine Guns (Alex Shelley & Chris Sabin); Subculture (Mark Andrews & Flash Morgan Webster); The Design (Deaner, Joe Doering & Kon); The Good Hands (John Skyler & Jason Hotch); The Major Players (Matt Cardona & Brian Myers); The Rascalz (Zachary Wentz & Trey Miguel) |
| Knockouts Tag Team of the Year: MK Ultra (Masha Slamovich & Killer Kelly); The Coven (Taylor Wilde & KiLynn King); The Death Dollz (Courtney Rush & Jessicka); The SHAWntourage (Gisele Shaw, Savannah Evans & Jai Vidal) | X Division Star of the Year: Mike Bailey; Alan Angels; Black Taurus; Chris Sabin; Kevin Knight; Laredo Kid; Lio Rush; Trey Miguel |
| Match of the Year: Mike Bailey vs. Will Ospreay (Bound For Glory 2023); Josh Alexander vs. Bully Ray - Full Metal Mayhem (Hard To Kill 2023); Mickie James vs. Jordynne Grace (Hard To Kill 2023); Kenny King vs. Mike Bailey - Pit Fight (IMPACT January 19, 2023); Trey Miguel vs. Crazzy Steve - Monster's Ball (IMPACT February 23, 2023); ABC vs. Motor City Machine Guns (IMPACT March 2, 2023); Miyu Yamashita vs. Killer Kelly (IMPACT March 30, 2023); Deonna Purrazzo vs. Jordynne Grace (Rebellion 2023); Steve Maclin vs. KUSHIDA (Rebellion 2023); Chris Sabin vs. Mike Bailey (IMPACT May 25, 2023); PCO vs. Steve Maclin - No DQ (Under Siege 2023); Alex Shelley vs. Steve Maclin (Against All Odds 2023); Gisele Shaw vs. Deonna Purrazzo (Down Under Tour Night 2); Trinity vs. Deonna Purrazzo (Slammiversary 2023); Scott D'Amore and Eric Young vs. Bully Ray and Deaner (Slammiversary 2023); SUBCULTURE vs. The Rascalz (Emergence 2023); Hiroshi Tanahashi vs. Alex Shelley (Multiverse United 2); Deonna Purrazzo vs. Jordynne Grace (Victory Road 2023); Steve Maclin vs. Josh Alexander (Victory Road 2023); Chris Sabin vs. Lio Rush (IMPACT 1000); Gail Kim, Awesome Kong, Jordynne Grace, Mickie James and Trinity vs. Angelina Love, Deonna Purrazzo, Gisele Shaw, Savannah Evans and Tasha Steelz (IMPACT 1000); Eddie Edwards vs. Frankie Kazarian - Killer IMPACT (IMPACT October 12, 2023); ABC vs. The Rascalz (Bound For Glory 2023); Alex Shelley vs. Josh Alexander (Bound For Glory 2023); Eddie Edwards vs. Will Ospreay (Turning Point 2023); Jonathan Gresham vs. Alex Shelley (IMPACT November 9, 2023); Will Ospreay vs. Josh Alexander (IMPACT November 16, 2023) | Moment of the Year: The return of TNA announced at Bound For Glory (Bound For Glory 2023); The Last Rodeo ends with Mickie James winning Knockouts World Title (Hard To Kill 2023); Santino Marella debuts (Hard To Kill 2023); Tara makes surprise appearance as Gisele Shaw's partner (IMPACT Jan 26, 2023); Josh Alexander forced to relinquish World Title (IMPACT April 6, 2023); Trinity debuts in IMPACT (IMPACT May 4, 2023); Bully Ray powerbombs Scott D'Amore through a flaming table (Under Siege 2023); Alex Shelley wins the World Title (Against All Odds 2023); Eric Young returns at Slammiversary (Slammiversary 2023); Chris Sabin wins X-Division Title for 10th Time (IMPACT 1000); Knockouts Legends Return for IMPACT 1000 (IMPACT 1000); Team 3D return to the Ring at IMPACT 1000 (IMPACT 1000) |

== See also ==
- List of professional wrestling awards
- List of Pro Wrestling Illustrated awards
- List of Wrestling Observer Newsletter awards
- Slammy Awards
