= TNA Unbreakable =

Professional wrestling event series

Unbreakable
- Promotions: Total Nonstop Action Wrestling
- First event: TNA Unbreakable (2005)
- Last event: TNA Unbreakable (2025)

Unbreakable was a recurring professional wrestling event produced by Total Nonstop Action Wrestling (TNA). The original event was a pay-per-view card held during the month of September in 2005. The second event was an Impact Plus Monthly Special held in August 2019.

On February 13, 2025, TNA announced that they would hold a third Unbreakable event as a TNA+ monthly special on April 17, 2025, at the Cox Pavilion in Las Vegas, Nevada.

== Events ==
#	Event	Date	City	Venue	Main Event	Ref
1	TNA Unbreakable (2005)	September 11, 2005	Orlando, Florida	Impact Zone	Christopher Daniels (c) vs. A.J. Styles vs. Samoa Joe in a Three-way match for the TNA X Division Championship	
2	Impact Wrestling Unbreakable (2019)	August 2, 2019	Santa Ana, California	Esports Arena	Sami Callihan vs. Tessa Blanchard to determine the #1 contender for the Impact World Championship	
3	TNA Unbreakable (2025)	April 17, 2025	Las Vegas, Nevada	Cox Pavilion	Steve Maclin vs. A. J. Francis vs. Eric Young in a Tournament final for the inaugural TNA International Championship	
