= TNA Unbreakable (2025) =

Professional wrestling event

Unbreakable
- Promotion: Total Nonstop Action Wrestling
- Date: April 17, 2025
- City: Las Vegas, Nevada
- Venue: Cox Pavilion

TNA+ Monthly Specials chronology
← Previous; Sacrifice	Next → Under Siege

Unbreakable chronology
← Previous; 2019	Next → Last

The 2025 Unbreakable was a professional wrestling pay-per-view event produced by Total Nonstop Action Wrestling. The event took place on April 17, 2025, at the Cox Pavilion in Las Vegas, Nevada, and aired on TNA+ and Triller TV. It was the third event under the Unbreakable chronology.

Seven matches were contested at the event. In the main event, Steve Maclin defeated A. J. Francis and Eric Young in a tournament final to become the inaugural TNA International Champion. The event also marked the TNA debut of Sidney Akeem and the return from injury by Chris Bey.

== Production ==
=== Background ===
TNA previously held a pay-per-view event titled Unbreakable in 2005, and a monthly special in 2019 (then known as Impact Wrestling).

On, February 13, 2025, TNA announced that Unbreakable would take place on Thursday, April 17, 2025, at the Cox Pavilion in Las Vegas, Nevada.

=== Storylines ===
The event featured professional wrestling matches that involve different wrestlers from pre-existing scripted feuds and storylines. Wrestlers portray villains, heroes, or less distinguishable characters in scripted events that build tension and culminate in a wrestling match or series of matches.

On the April 3 episode of TNA Impact!, TNA Director of Authority Santino Marella came to the stage for an announcement, interrupting a promo between self-declared co-TNA Digital Media Champions Steph De Lander and Mance Warner. After demanding De Lander surrender the title belt, Marella immediately deactivated it to replace it with the TNA International Championship. The inaugural champion would be determined via a tournament culminating at Unbreakable, consisting of three three-way matches where the winners meet in the three-way finals, in honor of the 20th anniversary of the three-way match between AJ Styles, Samoa Joe, and TNA X Division Champion Christopher Daniels that main evented the first Unbreakable event – a match considered to be one of the greatest in TNA history and that helped put TNA on the map as a major national promotion.

The first-round matches would be announced later that night – Eddie Edwards vs. Ace Austin vs. Steve Maclin; Zachary Wentz vs. JDC vs. Eric Young; and A. J. Francis vs. Mance Warner vs. Sami Callihan. The latter match took place the following week, with Francis pinning Callihan to advance.

Sami Callihan, and Mance Warner and Steph De Lander had been feuding ever since the January 23 live episode of TNA Impact!, where De Lander confronted Callihan while carrying the TNA Digital Media Championship that she won in her "divorce" from on-screen husband PCO. Warner, De Lander's real-life fiancé, would debut and attack Callihan shortly after. Callihan and Warner would continually get into brawls for the next month, culminating in a street fight at Sacrifice which Warner won. Even after that, Callihan kept pursuing Warner and De Lander. On the March 27 TNA Impact!, Callihan, Warner, and De Lander had a war of words mediated by Santino Marella, but it ended when De Lander threw hot coffee into Callihan's face, kayfabe injuring his right eye. On the following week, Callihan demanded to be matched with Warner for the first round of the TNA International Championship tournament, replacing Zachary Wentz in their match with A. J. Francis. After both men failed to advance in the tournament, Callihan demanded that Marella give him one more match with Warner at Unbreakable, this time in Barbed Wire Massacre. The match was made official later that night.

== Reception ==
Jason Powell of Pro Wrestling Dot Net called the second three-way qualifier "an enjoyable match with a legitimate upset", saw the six-man tag team match had "a fun house show feel to it", critiqued that the Barbed Wire Massacre was delivered by both men but their feud didn't warrant said bout, and felt the International Title main event was a "decent match" that should have been replaced with the mixed tag team match. Powell concluded that: "Overall, the lineup for this show felt underwhelming for a WrestleMania weekend event. It turned out to be a solid show, but there should be better non-WWE shows in Vegas this weekend, and next weekend's TNA Rebellion looks much better on paper." Thomas Hall of 411Mania felt the opening three-way could have been on any Impact! episode while the second three-way was "more action packed", was put off by the Barbed Wire Massacre, and saw the International Title main event as a "fine enough match" that did not feel like a "special showdown" when compared to the original Unbreakable main event. Hall gave the event a 7 out of 10, saying: "For a bonus show, this was perfectly fine, but Rebellion is going to have a bit more pressure on it now and that's not a great thing." Jeremy Thomas, also writing for 411Mania, praised the two three-way qualifier bouts, called Moose-Akeem a "solid big man vs. flyer match", criticized the Barbed Wire Massacre for being "exceptionally slow" and having "long pauses" throughout the barbed wire use, and felt the International Title main event was "effectively booked" to the competitors' strengths and was "firmly watchable" despite the "anticlimatic" ending. Thomas gave the event a 6 out of 10, concluding that: "In the end, this was a watchable show with some great moments (particularly Bey's appearance) as long as you cut out that one bout out."

== Aftermath ==
Following the event, TNA announced that Steve Maclin will defend his newly won International Championship against Eric Young at Rebellion.

== Results ==
No.	Results	Stipulations	Times
1	Eric Young defeated Zachary Wentz and JDC by pinfall	TNA International Championship tournament semifinal match	8:50
2	Steve Maclin defeated Eddie Edwards and Ace Austin by pinfall	TNA International Championship tournament semifinal match	9:54
3	Moose defeated Sidney Akeem by pinfall	Singles match	8:54
4	Mike Santana and The Hardys (Jeff Hardy and Matt Hardy) defeated Mustafa Ali and The Nemeth Brothers (Nic Nemeth and Ryan Nemeth) by pinfall	Six-man tag team match	12:40
5	Joe Hendry and Masha Slamovich defeated Frankie Kazarian and Tessa Blanchard by pinfall	Mixed tag team match	14:10
6	Sami Callihan defeated Mance Warner (with Steph De Lander) by pinfall	Barbed Wire Massacre	19:10
7	Steve Maclin defeated A. J. Francis and Eric Young by pinfall	Tournament final for the inaugural TNA International Championship	13:40

=== Inaugural TNA International Championship Tournament ===
First round Impact! March 28–29, 2025 (Aired: April 10); Unbreakable; April 17, 2025
Eddie Edwards	9:55
Ace Austin	—
Steve Maclin	Pinfall
Zachary Wentz	8:50
JDC	—
Eric Young	Pinfall
A. J. Francis	Pinfall
Mance Warner	—
Sami Callihan	6:51

Final; Unbreakable; April 17, 2025
Steve Maclin	Pinfall
Eric Young	—
A. J. Francis	13:40
