= Victory Road (2025) =

TNA professional wrestling event

- Promotional poster
- Promotion: Total Nonstop Action Wrestling
- Date: September 26, 2025
- City: Edmonton, Alberta, Canada
- Venue: Edmonton Expo Centre

TNA+ Monthly Specials chronology
← Previous; Emergence	Next → Turning Point

Victory Road chronology
← Previous; 2024	Next → Last

The 2025 Victory Road was a professional wrestling event produced by Total Nonstop Action Wrestling. It took place on September 26, 2025, at Edmonton Expo Centre in Edmonton, Alberta, Canada, and aired on TNA+. It was the 19th event under the Victory Road chronology. It was also the first major wrestling event in Edmonton since WWE's Backlash in 2004. Wrestlers from WWE's NXT brand, with which TNA has a partnership, also appeared at the event.

Eleven matches were contested at the event, including one on the Countdown to Victory Road pre-show. In the main event, Leon Slater defeated Myron Reed to retain the TNA X Division Championship. In other prominent matches, Frankie Kazarian defeated Steve Maclin to win the TNA International Championship, NXT wrestler Kelani Jordan defeated Léi Ying Lee to win the vacant TNA Knockouts World Championship, and Mustafa Ali defeated Moose.

== Production ==
=== Background ===
Victory Road was an annual professional wrestling event produced by Total Nonstop Action Wrestling between 2004 and 2012. In 2013, TNA discontinued most of its monthly pay-per-view events in favor of the new pre-recorded One Night Only events. Victory Road would be revived as a "One Night Only" event in 2014, a special edition of Impact's weekly television series in 2017, and has been a monthly special for TNA+ since the 2019 event.

On June 26, 2025, it was announced that the 2025 Victory Road would take place on September 26, 2025, at Edmonton Expo Centre in Edmonton, Alberta, Canada.

=== Storylines ===
The event featured several professional wrestling matches that involved different wrestlers from pre-existing scripted feuds, plots, and storylines. Wrestlers portray heroes, villains, or less distinguishable characters in scripted events that build tension and culminate in a wrestling match or series of matches. Storylines are produced on TNA's weekly programs, Impact! and Xplosion.

On the August 21 episode of TNA Impact!, Matt Cardona teamed with The System's Moose and Brian Myers in a six-man tag team match against Order 4 (Mustafa Ali and The Great Hands (John Skyler and Jason Hotch)). The match was won by Order 4 due to interference by Tasha Steelz and Agent 0, who took out Alisha Edwards and Eddie Edwards, respectively, before Hotch hit Myers with a low blow and allowed Skyler to make the pin. Following the match, Ali ordered his Secret Service to hold Moose down as he brandished a chair, but was briefly stopped by JDC. Unfortunately, JDC was ultimately taken out by Agent 0, who slammed him onto the chair, ruling JDC out of action for weeks. Two weeks later, Ali delivered an address vignette declaring "war" The System and asking those in TNA to stand with Order 4 or be eliminated. The following week, Moose would defeat A. J. Francis after interference by Ali backfired. After the match, Moose would challenge Ali to a match at Victory Road, which would be made official later that night. Two weeks later on the TNA Impact! before Victory Road, Moose and Ali agreed to leave both their factions behind as the winner of this match would gain their faction the advantage in their upcoming Hardcore War at Bound for Glory.

On the September 11 TNA Impact!, Myron Reed defeated Jake Something and fellow Rascalz teammates Trey Miguel and Zachary Wentz in a four-way match, earning a TNA X Division Championship match against Leon Slater at Victory Road.

Frankie Kazarian began setting his sights on the TNA International Championship starting on the August 7 episode of TNA Impact!, where he sat at commentary for the match between Jake Something and champion Steve Maclin. The match, however, ended in a double countout as both men continued to fight outside the ring. Over a week later at Emergence, Maclin defeated Something in a No Disqualification, No Countout match to retain the title. Kazarian, who again sat on commentary, later confronted Maclin during a post-match interview, but retreated when Maclin tried goading him into a fight. Despite this, Kazarian repeatedly called Maclin out but would always retreat whenever Maclin approached him. On the August 18 TNA Impact, Kazarian hosted his interview segment The King's Speech with Mr. Anderson, making his first TNA appearance since 2016, as his guest. Though it seemed like a good gesture, Kazarian would compare Anderson and Maclin's military experience, saying the two of them were "cowards." Kazarian would later threaten Anderson, who was assaulted from behind by Something before Maclin ran in to stop them. TNA would then announce that Maclin would defend the TNA International Championship against Kazarian at Victory Road.

==== Cancelled matches ====
At NXT Heatwave, Ash by Elegance captured the TNA Knockouts World Championship by defeating Masha Slamovich and the defending champion, NXT Women's Champion Jacy Jayne, in a triple threat match, pinning Slamovich to do so. Nearly two weeks later, on the September 4 live episode of TNA Impact!, Ash and The Elegance Brand (Heather by Elegance, M by Elegance, and The Personal Concierge) held a celebration in her honor, but were eventually interrupted by Slamovich. There, she revealed that she would challenge Ash for the Knockouts World Championship at Victory Road. The following week, as The Elegance Brand confronted TNA Director of Authority Santino Marella to negotiate a stipulation for the title match, Marella decided to make it a Match by Elegance. On top of that, Indi Hartwell, who would be challenging for the TNA Knockouts World Championship at Bound for Glory, was made the special guest referee. However, on September 24, 2025, TNA ceased to advertise this match, following the company opening an internal investigation into Masha Slamovich over domestic abuse allegations. During the event, Ash by Elegance announced that she would vacate the TNA Knockouts World Championship, resulting in a battle royal to determine the next champion.

On the Countdown to Slammiversary, The IInspriation (Cassie Lee and Jessie McKay) challenged The Elegance Brand's Ash and Heather by Elegance for the TNA Knockouts World Tag Team Championship, but lost due to interference by M by Elegance and The Personal Concierge. Despite the loss, The IInspiration continued to chase after the titles, later receiving another opportunity at Emergence in a four-way tag team match also involving Fatal Influence (Fallon Henley and Jazmyn Nyx), and Léi Yǐng Lee and Xia Brookside. Ultimately, however, The Elegance Brand (represented by Heather and M) would retain the titles. On the August 11 TNA Impact!, Heather defeated McKay to assistance by M and The Personal Concierge, but after a brief post-match attack, Santino Marella put M and McKay in an impromptu match; McKay would go on to win. Afterwards, Marella would make a match between The Elegance Brand and The IInspiration for the TNA Knockouts World Tag Team Championship official for Emergence. As a result of the changes to the card from the Knockouts World Championship match's cancellation, however, this match was rescheduled to the next episode of TNA Impact! on Thursday.

== Reception ==
Ryan Ciocco of 411Mania called it "a top-heavy show", praising the X Division main event, the International and Knockouts World Title bouts, and Ali-Moose, but felt that both the tables and six-man tag matches should have been relegated to Impact! television to further their respective Bound for Glory bouts. He gave the event a 6.5 out of 10, saying: "As a point of building towards BFG, it served its purpose, but in its own vacuum, it was merely average." Chris Vetter of Pro Wrestling Dot Net called Ali-Moose the best match on the card, followed by the X Division Title main event, the Knockouts World Title match and the International Title bout, but felt the show overall was "merely an afterthought" with last minute, thrown together matches, giving note of both Hendry-Young and the Nemeths tag match having "house show quality" to them. Darrin Lilly of PWTorch praised Slater-Reed for being an "excellent match" that deserved its main event spot and called Maclin-Kazarian a "good match."

== Results ==
No.	Results	Stipulations	Times
1^{P}	Zachary Wentz defeated Trey Miguel and Cedric Alexander by pinfall	X Division Three-way match	7:02
2	The System (Eddie Edwards, Brian Myers, and JDC) defeated Order 4 (Agent 0, Jason Hotch, And John Skyler) by pinfall	Six-man tag team match	4:28
3	Léi Ying Lee and Kelani Jordan won by last eliminating Heather By Elegance (Note: Order of elimination from first eliminated: Lili "La Pescadita" Ruiz, Jody Threat, Xia Brookside, Dani Luna, M By Elegance, Cassie Lee, Jessie McKay, and Heather By Elegance.)	Battle Royal to determine who would face off for the TNA Knockouts World Championship later in the night	4:44
4	Matt Cardona and The Home Town Man defeated The Nemeths (Nic Nemeth and Ryan Nemeth) by pinfall	Tag team match	6:25
5	Mike Santana defeated Ridge Holland by pinfall	Singles match	8:13
6	Mustafa Ali defeated Moose by pinfall	Singles match The winner earned their team (Ali's Order 4 or Moose's The System) the advantage in Hardcore War at Bound for Glory	12:26
7	Joe Hendry defeated Eric Young by pinfall	Singles match	11:21
8	Matt Hardy defeated A. J. Francis	Tables match	10:00
9	Kelani Jordan defeated Léi Ying Lee by pinfall	Singles match for the vacant TNA Knockouts World Championship; Indi Hartwell was the special guest referee.	15:14
10	Frankie Kazarian defeated Steve Maclin (c) by pinfall	Singles match for the TNA International Championship	15:39
11	Leon Slater (c) defeated Myron Reed by pinfall	Singles match for the TNA X Division Championship	13:46
(c) / – the champion(s) heading into the match; P / – the match was broadcast on the pre-show
