= Impact Wrestling Unbreakable (2019) =

2019 professional wrestling event

Unbreakable (2019)
- Promotional poster featuring Scott Steiner, Petey Williams, and Jordynne Grace
- Promotion: Impact Wrestling
- Date: August 2, 2019
- City: Santa Ana, California
- Venue: Esports Arena

Impact Plus Monthly Specials chronology
← Previous; Bash at the Brewery	Next → Victory Road

Unbreakable chronology
← Previous; 2005	Next → 2025

The 2019 Unbreakable was a professional wrestling livestreaming event produced by Impact Wrestling. The event took place on August 2, 2019 at the Esports Arena in Santa Ana, California and aired live on Impact Plus. It was the second event in the Unbreakable chronology.

Nine professional wrestling matches were contested at the event. The main event was a singles match between Sami Callihan and Tessa Blanchard, resulting from winning the Mashup Tournament, to determine the #1 contender for Brian Cage's Impact World Championship at Bound for Glory. Also at the event, Rhino competed in his first match in Impact Wrestling since 2014, in which he defeated Moose. Other prominent matches on the card included Eddie Edwards versus Michael Elgin, Jake Crist defending the X Division Championship in a five-way match, Taya Valkyrie defending the Knockouts Championship against Havok and The North defending the World Tag Team Championship against Rich Swann and Willie Mack and Reno Scum in a three-way match.

== Production ==
=== Background ===
Impact Wrestling (then known as TNA) previously held a pay-per-view event titled Unbreakable in 2005. On July 11, 2019, Impact announced on its website that Unbreakable would return as an Impact Plus-exclusive monthly special.

=== Storylines ===
The event featured wrestlers from pre-existing scripted feuds and storylines. Wrestlers portrayed villains, heroes, or less distinguishable characters in the scripted events that built tension and culminated in a wrestling match or series of matches. Storylines were played out on Impact's weekly television program.

==== Main event match ====
At Slammiversary XVII, Brian Cage defeated Michael Elgin to retain the Impact World Championship. Later that night, Sami Callihan defeated Tessa Blanchard in an intergender match in the main event. On July 11, it was announced that a Mashup Tournament would take place, in which wrestlers would be randomly paired as tag team partners and four qualifying matches would be taking place with the winning teams competing in a fatal four-way elimination match and the winning team would face each other in a match at Unbreakable to become the #1 contender for the World Championship at Bound for Glory. On the July 19 episode of Impact Wrestling, the teams of Callihan and Blanchard, Elgin and Willie Mack, Moose and Eddie Edwards and Jake Crist and Wentz qualified for the fatal four-way elimination match in the Mashup Tournament, which Callihan and Blanchard won, thus setting up a rematch between the two at Unbreakable.

==== Championship matches ====
At Slammiversary, Taya Valkyrie successfully defended the Knockouts Championship against Havok, Su Yung and Rosemary in a Monster's Ball match. It was later announced that Valkyrie would defend her title against Havok in a singles match at Unbreakable.

On the July 19 episode of Impact Wrestling, Jake Crist and Wentz defeated the X Division Champion Rich Swann and Madman Fulton in a Mashup Tournament qualifying match after Fulton turned on Swann to help his Ohio Versus Everything teammate Jake Crist to pin Swann. This earned Crist, a title match against Swann on the following week's episode of Impact Wrestling, which Crist won to win the X Division Championship. It was announced that Crist would defend the X Division Championship against Ace Austin, Trey Miguel of The Rascalz and two unnamed opponents in a five-way match at Unbreakable.

At Bash at the Brewery, The North (Ethan Page and Josh Alexander) defeated The Latin American Exchange (Santana and Ortiz) to win the World Tag Team Championship, thus making the tag title match between LAX and The Rascalz at Slammiversary, a three-way match, where North retained the titles. It was later announced that North would defend the titles against Reno Scum (Adam Thornstowe and Luster the Legend) and the team of Rich Swann and Willie Mack in a three-way match at Unbreakable.

==== Undercard matches ====
At Slammiversary, Rhino made his surprise return to Impact Wrestling being disguised under a mask as he rescued Don Callis from an attack by Michael Elgin by striking him with a Gore just after Elgin had lost his World Championship match to Brian Cage and attacked him. Cage and Elgin had a street fight rematch on the July 26 episode of Impact Wrestling, which ended in a no contest as Elgin attacked him backstage and continued the assault in the ring until Rhino appeared again and removed his mask to reveal himself and hit a second Gore to Elgin. Impact Wrestling later announced that Rhino would be competing in his first Impact Wrestling match since 2014 at Unbreakable. Moose had been involved in a feud with Rob Van Dam, whom he defeated at Slammiversary and expressed his dislike for former wrestlers of Extreme Championship Wrestling coming to Impact Wrestling, which led to Moose being announced as Rhino's opponent at Unbreakable.

A few more matches were announced for the Unbreakable special including Eddie Edwards versus Michael Elgin and Madison Rayne in action. It was also announced that Scott Steiner would return to Impact Wrestling by teaming with Jordynne Grace and Petey Williams in a six-person tag team match.

== Event ==
=== Preliminary matches ===
The opening match was a tag team match between PPRay and the team of Chris Bey and Watts. PPRay won the match by executing a fireman's carry into a brainbuster on Watts.

Next, Jake Crist defended the X Division Championship against Ace Austin, Adrian Quest, Danny Limelight and Trey Miguel in a five-way match. Crist performed a diving cutter on Limelight to retain the title.

Next, Madison Rayne took on Ayoka Muhara. Rayne executed a Cross Rayne on Muhara to gain a victory.

Next, Eddie Edwards took on Michael Elgin. After a back and forth match, Elgin delivered an Elgin Bomb to Edwards for the win.

Next, Scott Steiner made his return to Impact Wrestling as he teamed with Jordynne Grace and Petey Williams to take on Dicky Mayer, Gentleman Jervis and Ryan Taylor in a six-person tag team match. Near the end of the match, Williams nailed a Canadian Destroyer, Steiner nailed a Frankensteiner and Grace executed a Grace Drive on all three opponents and then applied Steiner Recliners on all three of them for the win.

Next, Taya Valkyrie would defend the Knockouts Championship against Havok. Near the end of the match, Havok prevented a Road to Valhalla attempt from Valkyrie until John E. Bravo interrupted by dragging Valkyrie outside the ring. This led to Havok hitting a chokeslam on Bravo and Valkyrie rolled her up to get a near-fall. Valkyrie then raked Havok in the eye and left the ring to get purposely counted out and retain the title.

Later, Rhino took on Moose. After a back and forth match, Rhino nailed a Gore on Moose for the win.

In the penultimate match, The North (Ethan Page and Josh Alexander) defended the World Tag Team Championship against the team of Rich Swann and Willie Mack and Reno Scum (Adam Thornstowe and Luster the Legend) in a three-way match. North nailed a tandem alley oop on Thornstowe to win the match and retain the World Tag Team Championship.

=== Main event match ===
In the main event, Tessa Blanchard took on Sami Callihan to determine the #1 contender for the Impact World Championship at Bound for Glory. Blanchard executed a Magnum on Callihan until Jake Crist interfered and caused the distraction. Crist then handed his X Division Championship belt to Callihan and he hit Blanchard with the title to win the match. After the match, Tommy Dreamer saved Blanchard from Ohio Versus Everything and put her over.

== Reception ==
Andrew of SoCal Uncensored criticized the audio quality of the event, citing "From the poor mixing to the sounds in the ring not being picked up more clearly, and to the main live audio feed being broadcast in mono while the pre tapes were in stereo really hurt this show. I feel like if Impact had someone better running audio, this show would've been really great. Instead, it hindered it and hurt my enjoyment of several matches, like Elgin vs. Edwards. The production really came off as amateurish as a result." However, he praised some of the matches and in-ring performances, citing "Impact Wrestling had a good outing for their return to SoCal. Danny Limelight might've had the best showing on the card out of all the locals. His performance in the X-Division match was the highlight of that match. Elgin/Edwards was the best match of the night.", with "Aside from the Knockouts title and Madison Rayne's matches, everything on this show was solid. Don Callis and Josh Matthews were great on commentary too."

Larry Csonka of 411Mania considered it an average event and gave a rating of 6.0. According to him, Unbreakable "was an overall solid show, with Edwards vs. Elgin & Tessa vs. Sami being the best matches. But they really need to fix the sound levels on these shows as the crowd was once again poorly mic'd, which killed the show’s atmosphere."

== Aftermath ==
Rich Swann and Willie Mack retained in title contention as they earned a World Tag Team Championship match against The North at Bound for Glory. Rob Van Dam and Rhino defeated North in a non-title match on September 13 episode of Impact Wrestling, which resulted in RVD and Rhino being added into the tag team title match, making it a triple threat match for the championship at Bound for Glory.

Taya Valkyrie and Havok continued their feud after Unbreakable as the two competed in a rematch for the Knockouts Championship on the October 11 episode of Impact Wrestling, where Valkyrie retained her title after John E. Bravo pulled out the referee while the referee was counting the pinfall for Havok, leading to the referee disqualifying Valkyrie.

The feud between Tessa Blanchard and oVe continued after Unbreakable as Blanchard competed against OVE members in various matches. On the September 27 episode of Impact Wrestling, Blanchard defeated Dave Crist to qualify for a ladder match for Jake Crist's X Division Championship at Bound for Glory.

== Results ==
No.	Results	Stipulations	Times
1^{D}	Fidel Bravo defeated El Mariachi Loco	Singles match	—
2	PPRay (Peter Avalon and Ray Rosas) defeated Chris Bey and Watts	Tag team match	07:29
3	Jake Crist (c) defeated Ace Austin, Adrian Quest, Danny Limelight and Trey Miguel	Five-way match for the Impact X Division Championship	09:52
4	Madison Rayne defeated Ayoka Muhara	Singles match	05:12
5	Michael Elgin defeated Eddie Edwards	Singles match	16:50
6	Jordynne Grace, Petey Williams and Scott Steiner defeated Dicky Mayer, Gentleman Jervis and Ryan Taylor	Six-person tag team match	11:37
7	Havok defeated Taya Valkyrie (c) (with John E. Bravo) by count-out	Singles match for the Impact Knockouts Championship	08:56
8	Rhino defeated Moose	Singles match	10:56
9	The North (Ethan Page and Josh Alexander) (c) defeated Reno Scum (Adam Thornstowe and Luster the Legend) and Rich Swann and Willie Mack	Three-way tag team match for the Impact World Tag Team Championship	12:03
10	Sami Callihan defeated Tessa Blanchard	Singles match to determine the #1 contender for the Impact World Championship at Bound for Glory	17:45
(c) / – the champion(s) heading into the match; D / – this was a dark match

=== Tournament brackets ===
Qualifiers; Impact Wrestling (July 19)
Moose and Eddie Edwards	Pin
Rohit Raju and Cody Deaner	5:14
Rich Swann and Madman Fulton	Pin
Wentz and Jake Crist	5:50
Michael Elgin and Willie Mack	Pin
Ace Austin and Stone Rockwell	N/A
Sami Callihan and Tessa Blanchard	Pin
Dave Crist and Trey	11:26

Final; Impact Wrestling (July 19)
Moose and Eddie Edwards
Wentz and Jake Crist
Michael Elgin and Willie Mack	Pin
Sami Callihan and Tessa Blanchard	12:07

#1 Contender's match (Unbreakable)
Sami Callihan	Pin
Tessa Blanchard	17:45
