= The Death Dollz =

Professional wrestling stable

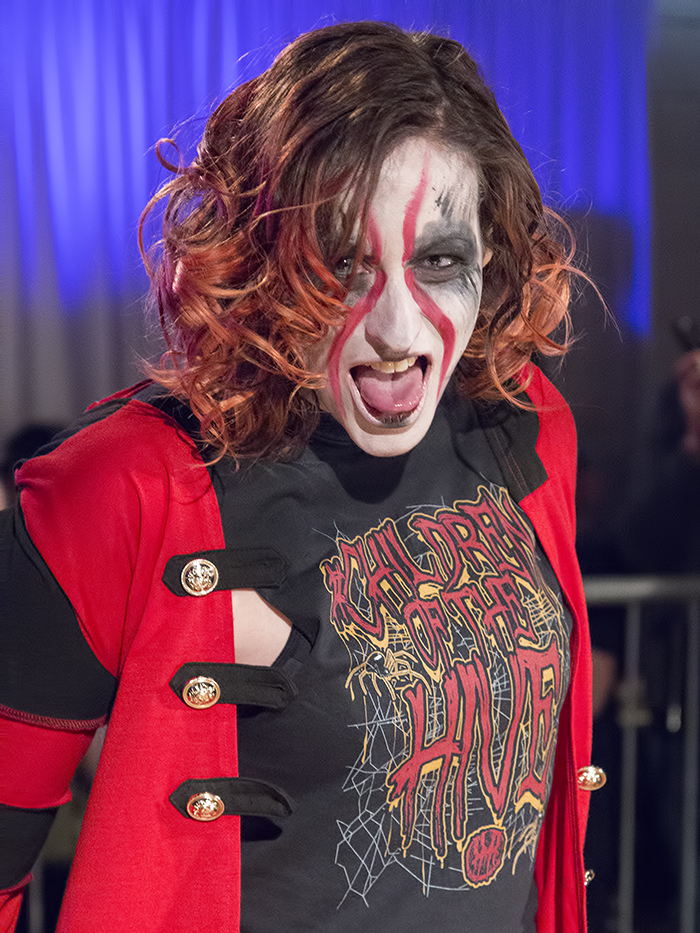
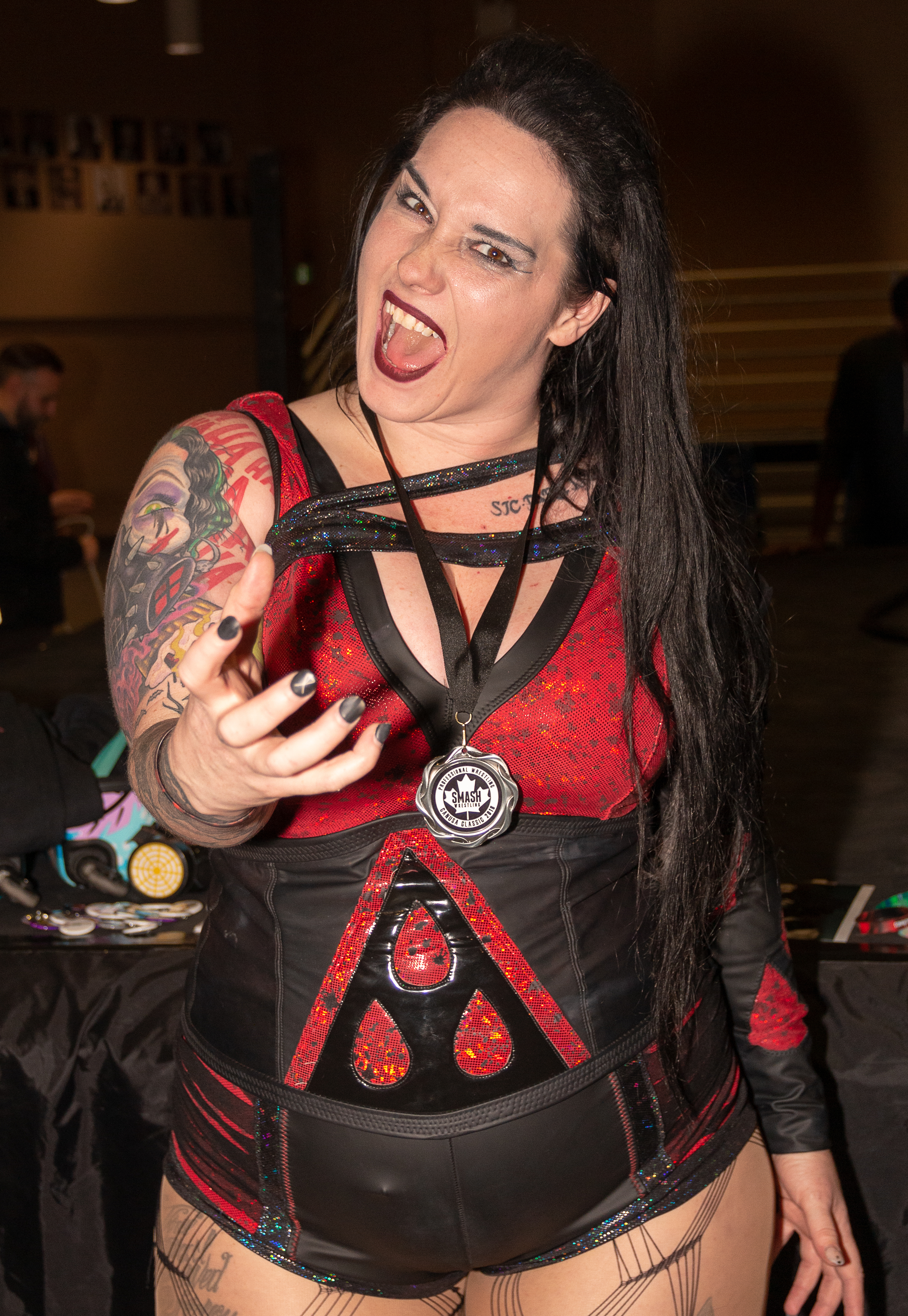
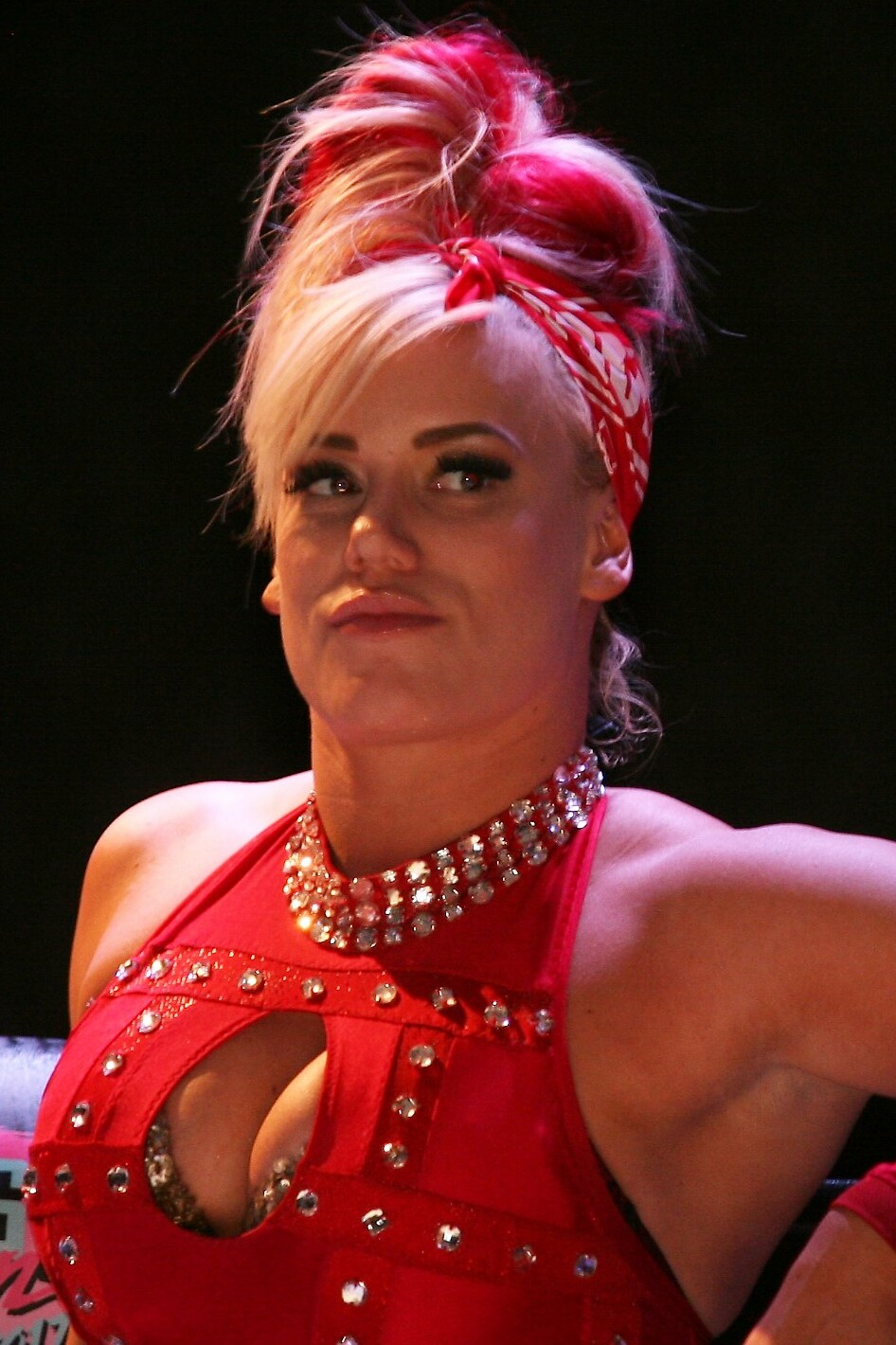
- 1st pic Rosemary, 2nd pic Jessicka Havok and 3rd Taya Valkyrie.

Stable
- Name(s): The Death Dollz; Death Dollz
- Billed heights: Rosemary: 5 ft 8 in (1.73 m); Valkyrie: 5 ft 8 in (1.73 m); Jessicka: 6 ft 0 in (1.83 m)
- Combined billed weight: 559 lb (254 kg)
- Former members: Rosemary / Courtney Rush; Jessicka / Havok; Taya Valkyrie
- Debut: July 14, 2022
- Years active: 2022–2023

The Death Dollz was a professional wrestling stable consisting of Rosemary, Taya Valkyrie and Jessicka as a sub-group of Decay. They are former Impact Knockouts World Tag Team Champions.

== Concept ==
The groups concept is a female version of punk Rock N’ Roll with Beauty similar to the movies “Freaky Friday” "Charlie's Angels", "Charlie's Angels: Full Throttle" and “A Cinderella Story” combined and unified with looks, gimmicks and attires of musical artists such as P!nk, Kelly Clarkson, Christina Aguilera, Avril Lavigne and Rock bands such as No Doubt, Everlife, Paramore and Evanescence (And No Doubt, Evanescence & Paramore lead singers Gwen Stefani, Amy Lee & Hayley Williams.) similar to the groups sub-group Decay, but a female only version.

== History ==
=== TNA / Impact Wrestling (2022–2023) ===
==== Knockouts Tag Team Champions (2022–2023) ====
On October 7, at Bound for Glory, Jessicka, Rosemary and Valkyrie defeated VXT (Chelsea Green and Deonna Purrazzo) to become new Impact Knockouts World Tag Team Champions This win was the first official reign for the Death Dollz. During their reign, The Death Dollz defended their title against various contenders, such as Savannah Evans and Tasha Steelz and The Hex (Allysin Kay and Marti Belle). On The July 15, 2023 episode of Impact! The Death Dollz Lost the Knockouts Tag Team titles to The Coven (KiLynn King and Taylor Wilde).

On the May 25, 2023rd episode of Impact it was confirmed that The Death Dollz would face The Coven on the Countdown to Under Siege. On May 26, at Under Siege, The Death Dollz defeated The Coven in a non-title match.

==== Taya Valkyrie's departure from group and TNA (2023) ====
Shortly after during year 2023 Taya Valkyrie was released from TNA along with her husband Johnny TV for Ring of Honor (ROH) separating herself from the female proportion of the group.

After Taya left The Death Dollz the duo's name's went back the name Decay & the name Rosemary and Havok, with only just Rosemary and Havok.

== Before they were The Death Dollz ==
=== TNA / Impact Wrestling (2020–2022) ===
==== Meet-ups & Team-ups before The Death Doll name (2020–2022) ====
On October 24, 2020, at Bound For Glory, the revival of the Impact Knockouts Tag Team Championships were officially announced by Madison Rayne, with a tournament to award the winners with the revived titles taking place. Rosemary and Taya Valkyrie entered the tournament but lost to Fire N’ Flava in the 2nd round. Months after Havok joined alongside Rosemary and the two became a female tag team within the male and female proportion of the group called Decay in Impact Wrestling. Afterwards on May 15, 2021, at Slammiversary Rosemary and Havok defeated then champions Fire N' Flava to win the titles for the first time in their career. Months prior to the win Havok also entered the Knockouts Tag Team Championship revival tournament but with Nevaeh and lost to Fire N' Flava at Hard to Kill in the finals. On October 23, at Bound for Glory, as Decay Rosemary and Havok lost their titles to the debuting team of The IInspiration (Cassie Lee and Jessica McKay), ending their reign at 98 days.

At Slammiversary 2022, Taya Valkyrie re-teamed with Rosemary to defeat Madison Rayne and Tenille Dashwood for the Impact Knockouts Tag Team Championship. (Note: This reign wasn't officially counted for the Death Dollz, as they weren't known by that name at the time) This win made Taya an associate of Decay especially due to it being her second time teaming with Rosemary since the revived Knockouts Tag Team title tournament who was already a part of Decay, showing more signs and indication of The Death Dollz officially and permanently being in formation. On the July 14 episode of Impact !, Havok was rescued by Valkyrie and Rosemary from the Undead Realm, and became known as her split personality Jessicka. On August 12, 2022, at Emergence Pre-show Rosemary and Taya lost the titles to VXT (Chelsea Green and Deonna Purrazzo).

The three have also held the TNA / Impact Knockouts Championship at least one time in their career separately before they were The Death Dollz.

== Sub-groups ==
Affiliate	Members	Tenure	Type
Decay	Abyss; Crazzy Steve; Rosemary/Courtney Rush; Black Taurus; Jessicka; Taya Valkyrie	2016–2017; 2018; 2021–2023; 2024	Tag team stable
Killer Death Machines / Havok and Nevaeh	Jessicka Havok; Nevaeh	2020–2021	Tag team

== Sponsorships ==
The trio have Death Doll clothing merchandise available to be purchased online.

== Championships and accomplishments ==
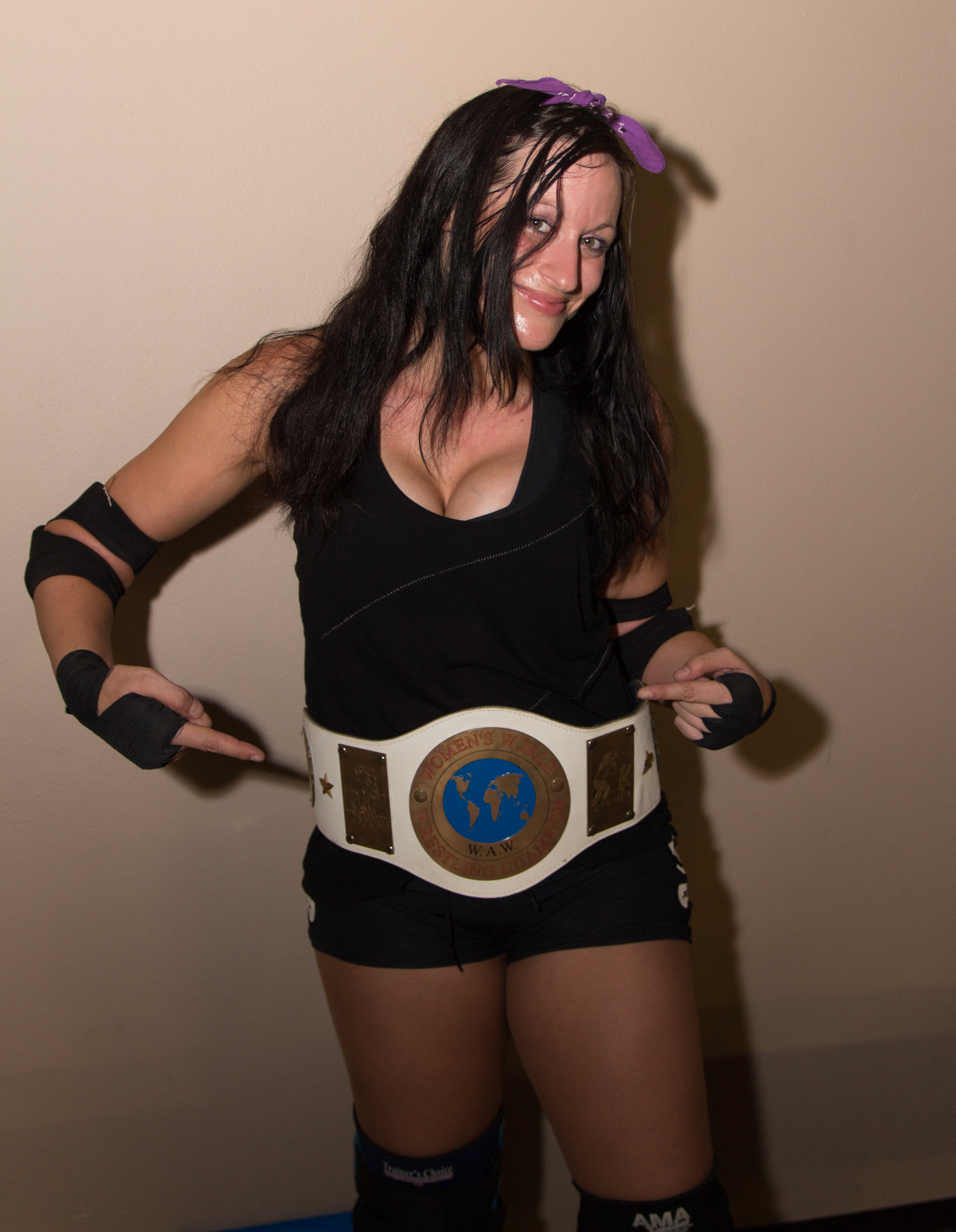
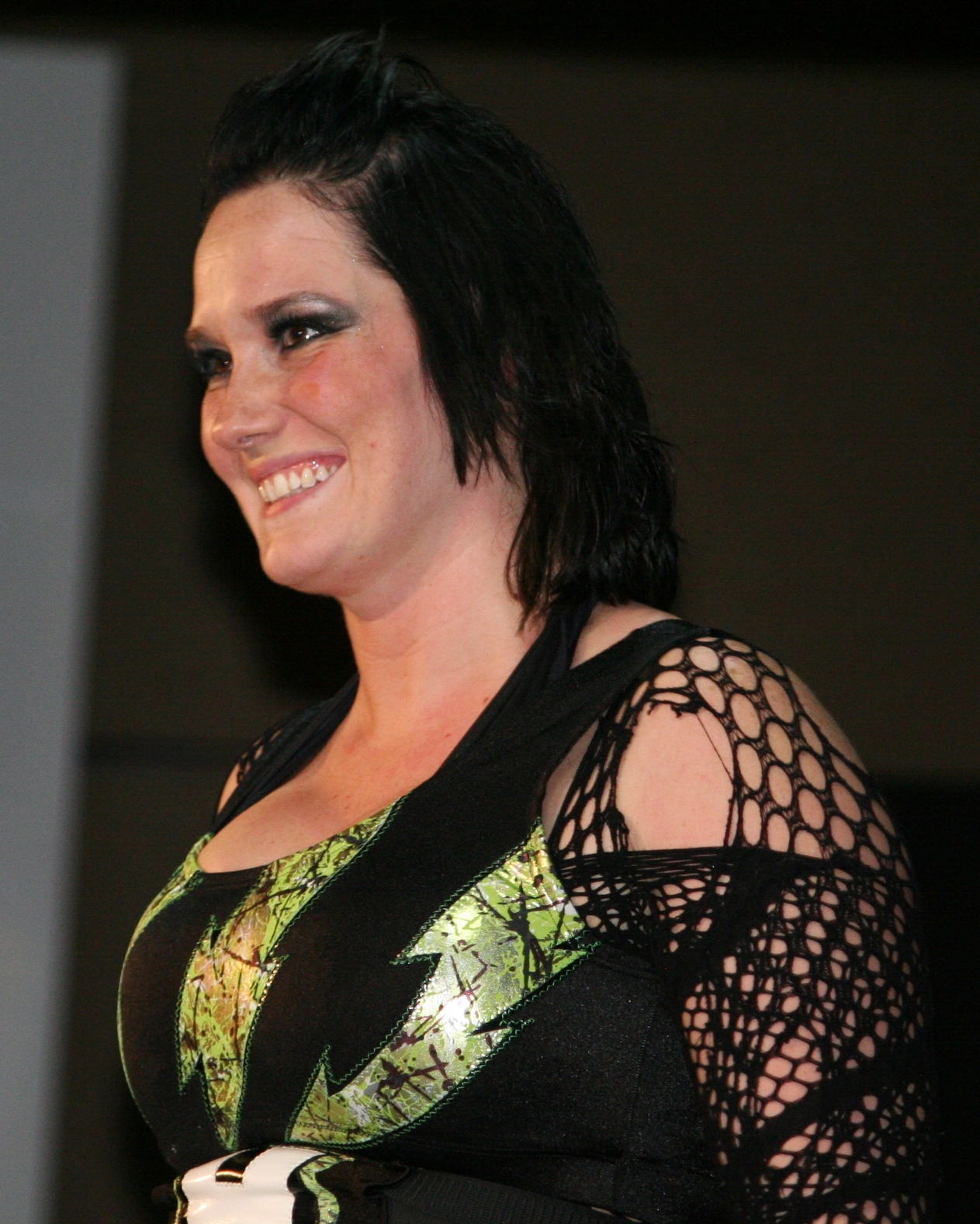
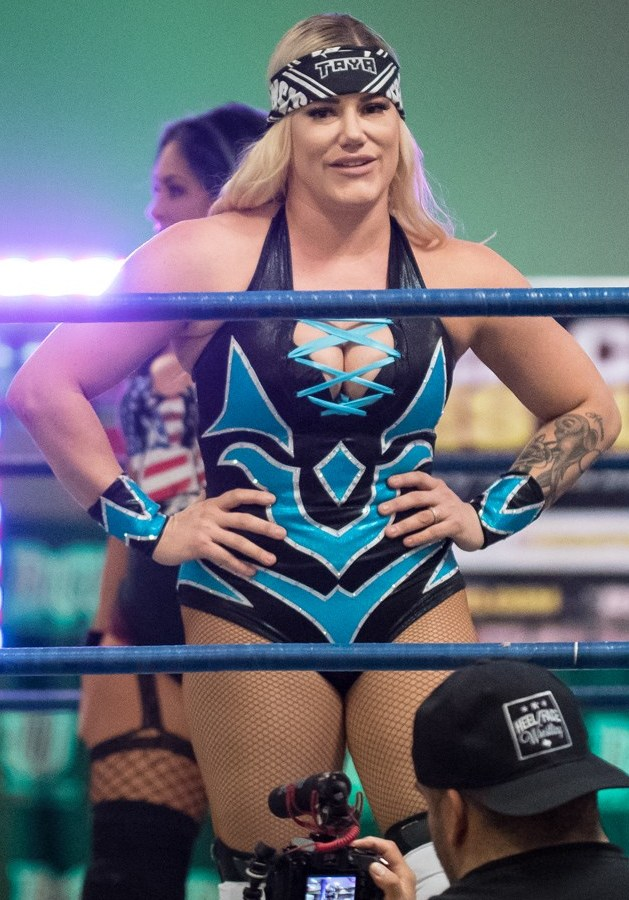
Another look at the female trio group Rosemary, Jessicka Havok and Taya Valkyrie The Death Dollz / 1-time Impact/TNA Knockouts World Tag Team Champions.
- Total Nonstop Action Wrestling / Impact Wrestling
  - Impact/TNA Knockouts World Tag Team Championship (1 time) – Rosemary (1), Jessicka Havok (1) and Taya Valkyrie (1) (Note: Jessicka won her previous two Knockouts tag titles under the ring name Havok)
  - Impact Year End Awards (1 time)
    - Knockouts Tag Team of the Year (2022) – Jessicka, Rosemary, and Valkyrie

== See also ==
- Undisputed Kingdom
- The OGK
- The Beautiful People
- The Allure
