= TNA International Championship =

Men's professional wrestling championship

- The standard design of the TNA International Championship belt

Details
- Promotion: Total Nonstop Action Wrestling
- Date established: March 29, 2025
- Current champion: A. J. Francis
- Date won: November 19, 2026
Statistics
- First champion: Steve Maclin
- Most reigns: 2 reigns: Steve Maclin; Mustafa Ali; Jason Hotch
- Longest reign: Steve Maclin (1st reign, 162 days)
- Shortest reign: Frankie Kazarian (16 days)
- Oldest champion: Frankie Kazarian (48 years, 53 days)
- Youngest champion: Channing "Stacks" Lorenzo (28 years, 279 days)
- Heaviest champion: A. J. Francis (330 lb (150 kg))
- Lightest champion: Trey Miguel (172 lb (78 kg))

The TNA International Championship is a men's professional wrestling championship created and promoted by Total Nonstop Action Wrestling (TNA). The inaugural champion was Steve Maclin. The current champion is A. J. Francis, who is in his first reign. He won the title by defeating Jason Hotch on the November 19, 2026, taping of Thursday Night Impact!.

== History ==
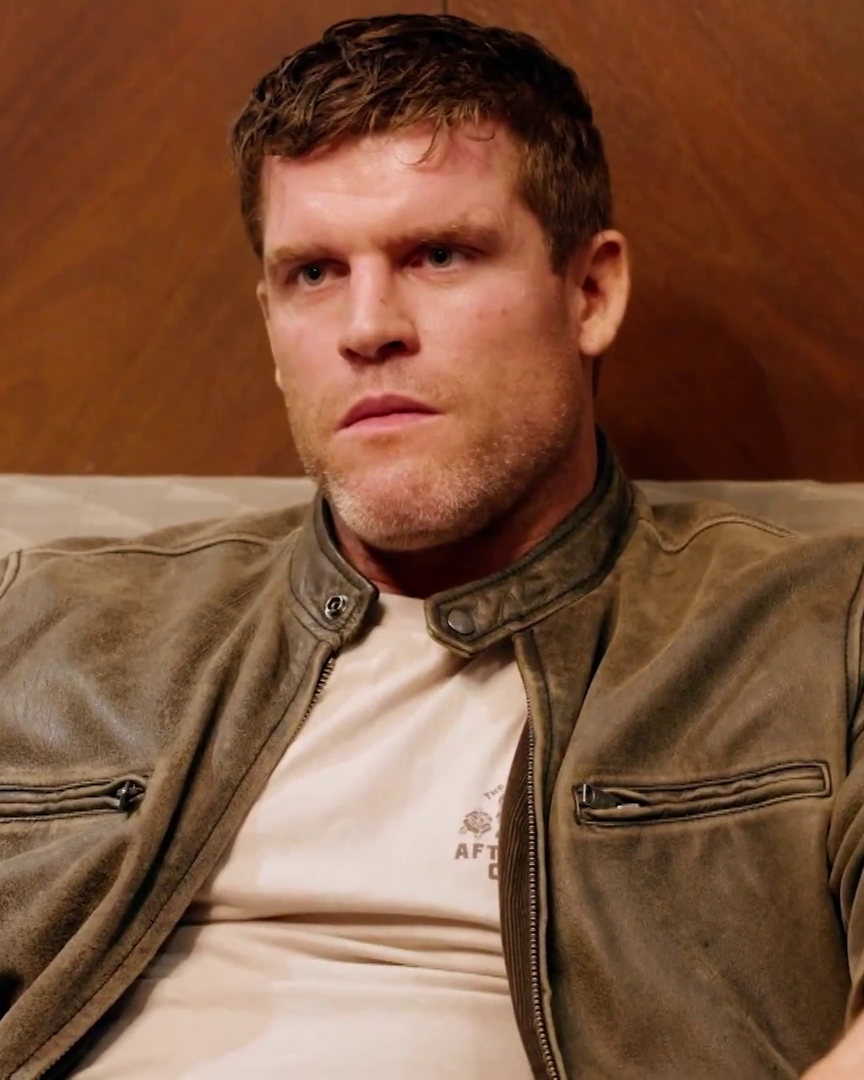
Inaugural and record-tying two-time champion Steve Maclin

On March 29, 2025, during the Impact! tapings, TNA Director of Authority Santino Marella stripped Steph De Lander of the TNA Digital Media Championship. He then retired it and replaced it with the TNA International Championship.

On April 10, Total Nonstop Action Wrestling (TNA) announced four sets of triple threat matches to determine the inaugural champion. On the April 10 episode of Impact!, A. J. Francis defeated Mance Warner and Sami Callihan in the first round to advance to the tournament final. The other first round matches took place at Unbreakable on April 17, where Eric Young defeated Zachary Wentz and JDC, and Steve Maclin defeated Eddie Edwards and Ace Austin. The final took place later that night, where Maclin defeated Young and Francis to become the inaugural TNA International Champion.

=== Inaugural tournament ===
First round Impact! March 28–29, 2025 (Aired: April 10); Unbreakable; April 17, 2025
Eddie Edwards	9:55
Ace Austin	—
Steve Maclin	Pinfall
Zachary Wentz	8:50
JDC	—
Eric Young	Pinfall
A. J. Francis	Pinfall
Mance Warner	—
Sami Callihan	6:51

Final; Unbreakable; April 17, 2025
Steve Maclin	Pinfall
Eric Young	—
A. J. Francis	13:40

== Championship belt designs ==
The TNA International Championship belt design has a Light blue leather strap and a gold diamond shape center plate with a light blue earth in the middle of it indented with gold as the land with the red TNA logo in the middle of it with multiple country flags circling around the earth and the TNA logo and the word International at the top above all of it. There are a total of four side plates with two on each side between the center plate that are gold square oval shaped plates with a light blue earth in the middle of it indented with gold.

Trey Miguel's custom belt design.

On the February 19, 2026 episode of TNA Wrestling Trey Miguel debuted his custom Light green leather strap version of the TNA International Championship belt. Where the title design is the same as the original but with a light green strap (as that is Miguel's signature color on his gear) and the plates being silver instead of gold, while the earths on the plates are Light green with silver as the land instead of Light blue with gold as the land.

Shortly after Trey Miguel debuted a second look of the green strap International belt where the plates are no longer silver but gold.

After Mustafa Ali defeated Trey Miguel for the title at Rebellion, the championship appearance was reverted to its original look.

== Reigns ==
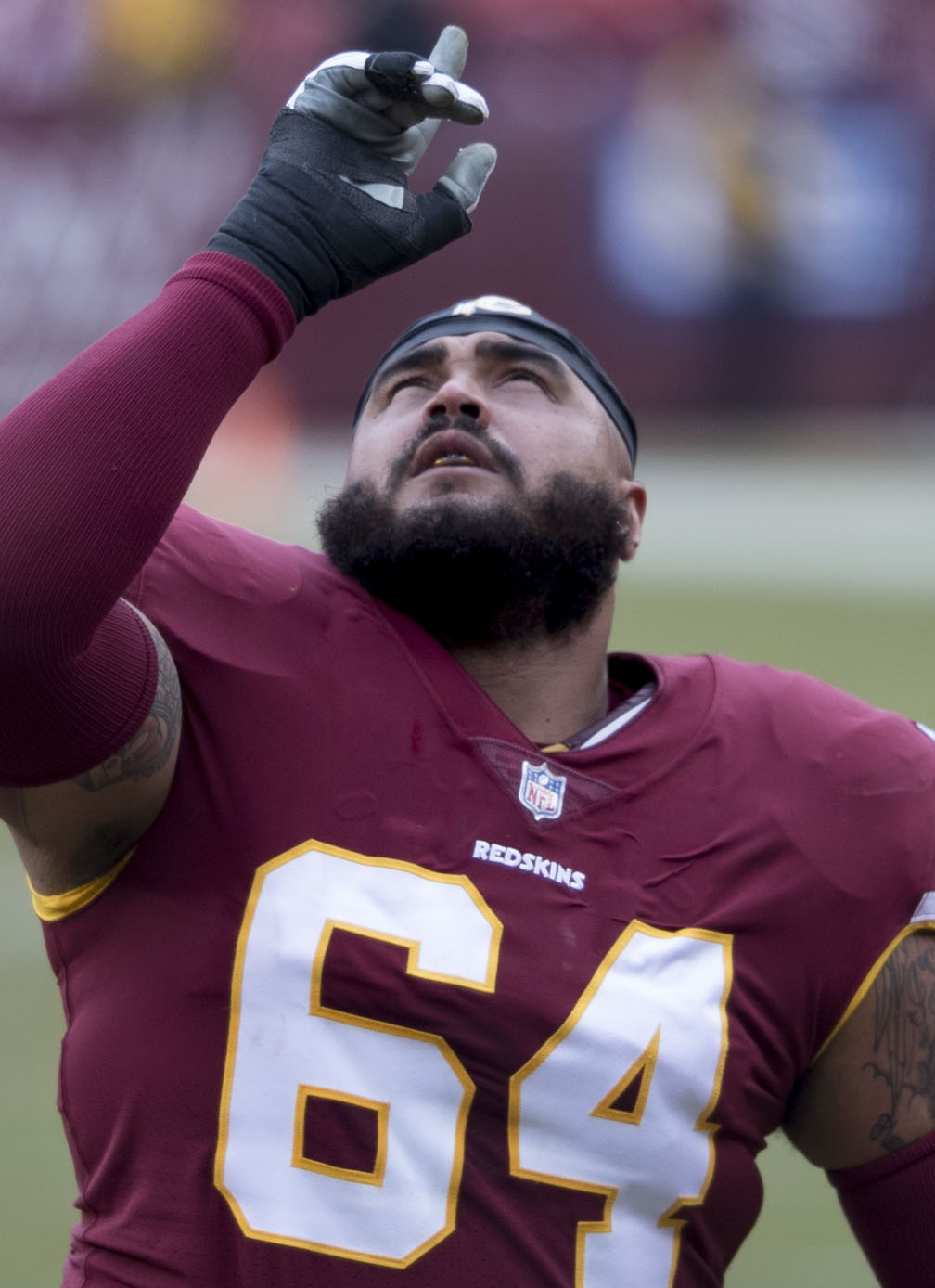
Current champion A. J. Francis

As of November 20, 2026, there have been 10 reigns among seven wrestlers. Steve Maclin was the inaugural champion. Maclin, Mustafa Ali, and Jason Hotch are tied for the most reigns at two. Maclin's inaugural reign is the longest at 162 days, while Frankie Kazarian has the shortest reign at 16 days. Kazarian is also the oldest champion when he won the title at 48 years old, while Channing "Stacks" Lorenzo is the youngest champion when he won it at 28 years old.

A. J. Francis is the current champion in his first reign. He won the title by defeating Jason Hotch on the November 19, 2026, taping of Thursday Night Impact! in Calgary, Alberta, Canada.

Key
No.	Overall reign number
Reign	Reign number for the specific champion
Days	Number of days held
Days recog.	Number of days held recognized by the promotion
+	Current reign is changing daily

No.	Champion	Championship change			Reign statistics			Notes	Ref.
No.	Champion	Date	Event	Location	Reign	Days	Days recog.	Notes	Ref.
Total Nonstop Action Wrestling (TNA)
1	Steve Maclin	April 17, 2025	Unbreakable	Paradise, NV	1	162	162	Defeated Eric Young and A. J. Francis in a tournament final to become the inaugural champion.	
2	Frankie Kazarian	September 26, 2025	Victory Road	Edmonton, AB	1	16	16		
3	Steve Maclin	October 12, 2025	Bound for Glory	Lowell, MA	2	54	54		
4	Channing "Stacks" Lorenzo	December 5, 2025	Final Resolution	El Paso, TX	1	70	70		
5	Trey Miguel	February 13, 2026	No Surrender	Nashville, TN	1	57	57	This was Miguel's Feast or Fired cash-in match.	
6	Mustafa Ali	April 11, 2026	Rebellion	Cleveland, OH.	1	110	110		
7	Jason Hotch	July 30, 2026	Thursday Night Impact!	Philadelphia, PA	1	24	24		
8	Mustafa Ali	August 23, 2026	Lockdown	Chicago, IL	2	49	49	This was a Steel Cage match.	
9	Jason Hotch	October 11, 2026	Bound for Glory	Tampa, FL	2	39	39	This The Order 4-way match also featured John Skyler and Special Agent 0.	
10	A. J. Francis	November 19, 2026	Thursday Night Impact!	Calgary, Alberta, Canada	1	1+	1+	Will air on a future episode of Impact!.	

== Combined reigns ==
As of November 20, 2026.

†	Indicates the current champion

Rank	Wrestler	No. of reigns	Combined days	
Rank	Wrestler	No. of reigns	Actual	Recognized by TNA
1	Steve Maclin	2	216	
2	Mustafa Ali	2	159	
3	Channing "Stacks" Lorenzo	1	70	
4	Jason Hotch	2	63	63
5	Trey Miguel	1	57	
6	Frankie Kazarian	1	16	
7	A. J. Francis †	1	1+	1+
