= Jason Hotch =

American professional wrestler (born 1997)

Personal information
- Born: Eric Hotchkiss; March 17, 1997 (age 29) Toledo, Ohio, U.S.
- Children: 1

Professional wrestling career
- Ring name(s): Jason Hotch; Jason Page
- Billed from: Toledo, Ohio
- Trained by: Conrad Kennedy III; Trey Miguel
- Debut: 2018

Eric Alan Hotchkiss (born March 17, 1997), better known by his ring name Jason Hotch, is an American professional wrestler. He is signed to Total Nonstop Action Wrestling (TNA). He is a former two-time TNA International Champion.

== Early life ==
Eric Hotchkiss was born on March 17, 1997, in Toledo, Ohio. He is a 2015 graduate of Bedford High School.

== Professional wrestling career ==
=== Impact Wrestling/Total Nonstop Action Wrestling (2022–present) ===
In early 2022, Hotch signed a contract with Total Nonstop Action Wrestling (then known as Impact Wrestling) after he won the Gut Check. He made his Impact debut on the December 29, 2022 episode of Before the Impact, where he teamed with John Skyler under the tag team name The Good Hands, in a losing effort to Delirious and Yuya Uemura. Throughout 2023 and early 2024, they were utilized as jobbers, including losing an Impact World Tag Team Championship bout to ABC (Ace Austin and Chris Bey) at Against All Odds. On the June 7, 2024 episode of TNA Xplosion, they won their first bout against Sinner (Judas Icarus) and Saint (Travis Williams).

In February 2025, Mustafa Ali formed a stable called the "Order 4" with The Good Hands (John Skyler and Jason Hotch), later renamed "The Great Hands", and Tasha Steelz as his heads of security and press secretary, respectively. At Under Siege, Order 4 defeated Raj Singh, Indi Hartwell, and The Rascalz (Trey Miguel and Zachary Wentz) in an eight-person mixed tag team match. On the August 21 TNA Impact, Order 4 (Ali, Skyler and Hotch) defeated Matt Cardona and The System's Moose and Brian Myers due to assistance from Steelz and Agent 0, who wiped out Alisha Edwards and Eddie Edwards, respectively. This resulted in a feud, which culminated at Bound for Glory on October 12, where The System (Moose, Alisha, Eddie, Myers and JDC) defeated Order 4 (Ali, Steelz, Agent 0, Hotch and Skyler), thus solidifying the former as the #1 faction in TNA.

On the July 30, 2026 episode of Impact!, Hotch defeated fellow Order 4 member Mustafa Ali to win the TNA International Championship after winning a vote made by Ali for the TNA locker room, marking his first title win in TNA. On the following week's episode of Impact!, Hotch turned face for the first time in his career after confronting Ali for the latter's inappropriate actions towards his wife. He also declared that he would defend his title against Ali at Lockdown, and subsequently left the Order 4. At Lockdown, Hotch lost the TNA International title back to Ali, ending his reign at 24 days. On October 11 at Bound for Glory, Hotch defeated Ali, John Skyler and Special Agent 0 in a four-way match to win his second TNA International Championship.

== Championships and accomplishments ==
- Extreme Hardcore Wrestling
  - EHF Heavyweight Championship (1 time)
- Emerge Wrestling
  - Emerge Outbreak Championship (1 time)
- Great Lakes Wrestling Association
  - GLWA Heavyweight Championship (1 time)
- Horror Slam Wrestling
  - Horror Slam Heavyweight Championship (1 time)
- Insane Wrestling Revolution
  - IWR World Heavyweight Championship (1 time, current)
  - IWR United States Championship (2 times)
- Metro Pro Wrestling
  - MPW Heritage Championship (1 time)
  - MPW Metropolitan Championship (3 times)
- Mr. Chainsaw Pro Wrestling
  - MCPW Chainsaw Cup Championship (1 time)
  - MCPW Tag Team Championship (1 time) – with Eli Shelton
- Noble Champions Group
  - NCG North American Championship (1 time, current)
- Northwest Ohio Wrestling
  - NOW Tag Team Championship (1 time) – with Eli Shelton
- Total Nonstop Action Wrestling
  - TNA International Championship (2 times)
- Xtreme Intense Championship Wrestling
  - XICW Midwest Heavyweight Championship (1 time, current)
