= Bound for Glory (2025) =

2025 TNA Wrestling pay-per-view event

- Promotional poster featuring various wrestlers
- Promotion: Total Nonstop Action Wrestling
- Date: October 12, 2025
- City: Lowell, Massachusetts
- Venue: Tsongas Center
- Attendance: 6,137 (Note: Turnstile attendance was recorded at 6,137 by venue operator Oak View Group. Tickets sold – a separate metric – was reported at 5,554, with an announced attendance of 7,794.)

Pay-per-view chronology
← Previous; Slammiversary	Next → Genesis

Bound for Glory chronology
← Previous; 2024	Next → 2026

Bound for Glory was a professional wrestling pay-per-view (PPV) event produced by Total Nonstop Action Wrestling (TNA). It took place on October 12, 2025, at Tsongas Center in Lowell, Massachusetts. It was the 21st event under the Bound for Glory chronology and featured wrestlers from WWE's NXT brand, with which TNA has a partnership. The event featured the TNA Hall of Fame inductions of former one-time TNA Knockouts World Tag Team Champions The Beautiful People (Angelina Love and Velvet Sky), and former five-time TNA Knockouts World Champion Mickie James.

Nine matches were contested at the event, including one on the pre-show. In the main event, Mike Santana defeated NXT's Trick Williams to win the TNA World Championship. In other prominent matches, The Hardys (Matt Hardy and Jeff Hardy) defeated Team 3D (Bully Ray and Devon) in a Tables match dubbed as "One Final Table" to retain the TNA World Tag Team Championship and the NXT Tag Team Championship, Leon Slater vs. NXT's Je'Von Evans for Slater's TNA X Division Championship ended in a no contest, and The System (Moose, Alisha Edwards, Brian Myers, Eddie Edwards, and JDC) defeated Order 4 (Mustafa Ali, Tasha Steelz, Special Agent 0, Jason Hotch, and John Skyler) in a 10-person intergender Hardcore War.

This event was the highest-attended TNA event in North America in the company's 23-year history, as well as the highest-attended sports event in the history of the Tsongas Center. The previous record was 6,309, set during a Boston Fleet game on May 25, 2024. While TNA announced 7,794 in attendance, it was later reported 6,137 tickets were used.

== Production ==
=== Background ===
Bound for Glory is a professional wrestling pay-per-view (PPV) event produced by Total Nonstop Action Wrestling (TNA). The event was created in 2005 to serve as the company's flagship PPV event, similar to WWE's WrestleMania, in which wrestlers competed in various professional wrestling match types in what was the culmination of many feuds and storylines that occurred during the calendar year.

=== Storylines ===
The event featured several professional wrestling matches, which involve different wrestlers from pre-existing scripted feuds, plots, and storylines. Wrestlers portrayed heroes, villains, or less distinguishable characters in scripted events that build tension and culminate in a wrestling match or series of matches. Storylines are produced on the company's weekly programs, Impact! and Xplosion, as well as WWE's weekly television program, NXT, following WWE and TNA signing a multi-year partnership in January 2025.

After The Hardys (Jeff Hardy and Matt Hardy) captured the TNA World Tag Team Championship at Slammiversary, they were later confronted in the ring by old rival Bully Ray. While congratulating them on their title win, Ray would later challenge The Hardys to face Team 3D (Ray and Devon) one final time at Bound for Glory, which The Hardys accepted. On the September 25 episode of Impact!, both The Hardys and Team 3D agreed to make the match a Tables match with the TNA World Tag Team Championship on the line, after Ray admitted that he and Devon were always bothered by the fact that they had lost to The Hardys in the very first tag team Tables match at the WWE Royal Rumble over 25 years ago. On October 7, at NXT vs. TNA Showdown, The Hardys would defeat DarkState (Dion Lennox and Osiris Griffin) to win the NXT Tag Team Championship and it would subsequently be announced the following day that their match with Team 3D, dubbed as "One Final Table", would be a Winner Takes All match for both the NXT and TNA tag team titles.

After Trick Williams won the TNA World Championship from Joe Hendry at NXT Battleground, Williams would have several run-ins with Mike Santana. Confronting each other on the subsequent episode of NXT, Santana would challenge Williams for the title the following week but would lose due to interference from then-rival A. J. Francis. Over a month later at Slammiversary, Williams defended the title against both Hendry and Santana in a three-way match. Williams would appear to have injured his knee during the match, but towards the end, he would run back into the ring and toss Santana out to pin Hendry, thus retaining the title. Santana would continue his pursuit of Williams and the TNA World Championship despite the loss, as on the August 19 edition of NXT, Santana appeared in a box seat, distracting Williams and costing him his match with Je'Von Evans, and subsequently, an NXT Championship match at NXT Heatwave. Williams would appear on the August 21 episode of TNA Impact! two days later, but was quickly interrupted by Santana, who looked to gain another title match. TNA Director of Authority Santino Marella was about to do so; however, Williams rebutted by stating a clause in his contract meant he wouldn't defend the TNA World Championship for 50 days after his last defense, which was on August 15 against Moose at Emergence. This did not mean that Williams couldn't still wrestle, as the following week, he and Francis faced Santana and TNA International Champion Steve Maclin in a tag team match. The latter team won after Santana performed a schoolboy pin on Williams; he then quickly fended off Williams when he tried to attack him after the match. At the end of the show, Williams, along with his lawyer, came out to disparage TNA for what he believes are improper working conditions, while reiterating that following Emergence, he was not required to defend his title for the next 50 days. Marella would then come out and, after realizing that Bound for Glory was after the 50-day threshold, tried to make Williams' next title defense for the event, but was interrupted by his lawyer. He would then strike the lawyer with The Cobra shortly after. The week after, Marella began the show by declaring that Williams would defend the TNA World Championship against Santana at Bound for Glory. However, at NXT Homecoming on September 16, Raw's Grayson Waller hosted his talk show The Grayson Waller Effect with both NXT Champion Oba Femi and challenger, Ricky Saints. They were all interrupted by Williams, still wanting an NXT Championship match. Waller then proposed a Winner Takes All match between Femi and Williams for the following week on NXT with both titles on the line, which both men agreed, and it was subsequently made official, with the winner facing Saints for both titles at No Mercy. However, the match ended in a no contest after interference from Santana and several other TNA wrestlers, confirming that Santana would be facing Williams at Bound for Glory.

On the August 21 episode of TNA Impact!, a six-woman gauntlet match was held to determine the next challenger to the TNA Knockouts World Championship. In the second-to-last match, Indi Hartwell eliminated Dani Luna but was viciously attacked by her when she tried to show her respect, turning heel in the process. Jody Threat, Luna's former tag team partner and the last entrant of the match, was briefly able to stop her, only for Luna to return with a steel chair. When Threat again pleaded with her to calm down, Luna knocked her down with a strike, inadvertently making Threat the winner by disqualification. Luna would continue her assault on Hartwell after the match, taking out a security guard in the process. Luna had explained to Threat that she attacked Hartwell "for her," but when she heard Threat ask Santino Marella to reverse the decision of the gauntlet match, she later declared that she was tired of not getting what she deserved. On the following week's episode, Hartwell met with Marella to discuss a number one contender's match between her and Threat, only for Luna to confront them. After a brief argument between the two women, Marella decided to make a three-way match between them and Threat for next week to determine a proper challenger. There, Hartwell would pin Threat to become the number one contender and would officially challenge for the TNA Knockouts World Championship at Bound for Glory. She was originally scheduled to face the winner of Ash by Elegance and Masha Slamovich which was to be held at Victory Road, where she would serve as the special guest referee. However, the match was cancelled after TNA opened an internal investigation into domestic abuse allegations against Slamovich. At Victory Road, Ash would vacate the title, needing to step away from wrestling due to health concerns. As such, a battle royal was immediately held, with the final two competing for the vacant title later on; Hartwell would still serve as the match's referee. Léi Yîng Lee and NXT's Kelani Jordan would be the two finalists, with the latter beating the former to become the new TNA Knockouts World Champion. It was then announced that Jordan would defend the title against Hartwell at Bound for Glory.

On the August 21 TNA Impact, Order 4 (Mustafa Ali and The Great Hands (John Skyler and Jason Hotch)) defeated Matt Cardona and The System's Moose and Brian Myers due to assistance from Tasha Steelz and Agent 0, who wiped out Alisha Edwards and Eddie Edwards, respectively. After the match, Moose was restrained by Ali's Secret Service as Ali himself brandished a chair. JDC later ran out to try and stop him, but was beaten down by Agent 0, who slammed JDC onto the chair, rendering him out of action for several weeks. Ali would go on to declare war on The System, vowing to make Order 4 the ruling force in TNA. Three weeks later, Ali tried interfering in Moose's match with A. J. Francis, but accidentally struck Francis before being neutralized, allowing Moose to get the win. The following week, Ali defeated Myers in singles action, which eventually exploded into an all-out brawl between Order 4 and The System. Seeing enough, Santino Marella declared that the two factions would meet at Bound for Glory in Hardcore War. At Victory Road on September 26, Ali defeated Moose to earn the person advantage for Order 4.

After Leon Slater's successful TNA X-Division Championship defense against Myron Reed at Victory Road, Santino Marella announced that after discussions with NXT General Manager Ava, that he will defend the title at Bound for Glory against NXT's Je'Von Evans. The match was subsequently made official.

On the Countdown to Slammiversary, The IInspriation (Cassie Lee and Jessie McKay) challenged The Elegance Brand's Ash and Heather by Elegance for the TNA Knockouts World Tag Team Championship, but lost due to interference by M by Elegance and The Personal Concierge. Despite the loss, The IInspiration continued to chase after the titles, later receiving another opportunity at Emergence in a four-way tag team match also involving Fatal Influence (Fallon Henley and Jazmyn Nyx), and Léi Yǐng Lee and Xia Brookside. Ultimately, however, The Elegance Brand (represented by Heather and M) would retain the titles. On the August 11 TNA Impact!, Heather defeated McKay thanks to assistance by M and The Personal Concierge, but after a brief post-match attack, Santino Marella put M and McKay in an impromptu match; McKay would go on to win. As a result, The IInspiration initially earned a title match at Victory Road, but after the TNA Knockouts World Championship was vacated due to Ash stepping away from wrestling, the match was postponed to the October 2 episode of TNA Impact!. There, The IInspiration defeated Heather and M to finally win the TNA Knockouts World Tag Team Championship. On the following week's episode, during the contract signing between Kelani Jordan and Indi Hartwell for their Knockouts World Title match, The Personal Concierge declared that Heather and M would invoke their rematch clause to challenge The IInspiration for the titles again at Bound for Glory, which was later made official for the Countdown pre-show.

At Victory Road, Frankie Kazarian defeated Steve Maclin to win the TNA International Championship due to interference from AAA's El Mesías. The following week, after the October 2 TNA Impact!, Santino Marella informed Kazarian backstage that Maclin had invoked his rematch clause and would challenge Kazarian for the title at Bound for Glory.

After Tessa Blanchard returned to TNA the previous December, she has made a habit of threatening – and sometimes even physically harming – backstage reporter Gia Miller. This tension between the two women would culminate at Slammiversary, after Blanchard lost to Indi Hartwell. Miller attempted a post-match interview with Hartwell but was interrupted when the latter was attacked by Blanchard and Victoria Crawford. When Miller tried to intervene, Blanchard would turn her attention to her, slamming Miller's head repeatedly into the ring steps before being stopped by officials and security. Blanchard would be suspended indefinitely as a result of her actions. As for Miller, she would be off TNA programming for a few weeks, with Gabby LaSpisa taking over reporter duties. She would return on the August 7 episode of TNA Impact!, threatening to "kill" Blanchard if she ever put her hands on her again. Blanchard's suspension was eventually lifted per the request of Miller, and she made her return on the September 25 TNA Impact!. However, the following night at Victory Road in a backstage exclusive, Blanchard and Crawford laid out Miller and Jody Threat. On the subsequent TNA Impact!, Miller revealed she had lifted Blanchard's suspension on the condition that if she attacked her again, she would be free to make good on her words against Blanchard. Miller would go on to announce that she would face Blanchard at Bound for Glory in her proper TNA in-ring debut.

The Call Your Shot Gauntlet – a 20-wrestler intergender gauntlet match for a championship opportunity at the time and place of the winner's choosing – was announced for Bound for Glory on the September 25 episode of TNA Impact!. That same night, a qualifying battle royal was held, with the winner earning the final entry in the gauntlet match, while the last person eliminated would have to enter the gauntlet first. Mance Warner would last eliminate Léi Yîng Lee to earn the twentieth spot, meaning Lee would enter in the first position. On October 10, TNA announced that YouTube personality BDE, who recently began a career as a professional wrestler, would appear in the match.

== Results ==
No.	Results	Stipulations	Times
1^{P}	The IInspiration (Cassie Lee and Jessie McKay) (c) defeated The Elegance Brand (Heather by Elegance and M by Elegance) (with The Personal Concierge) by pinfall	Tag team match for the TNA Knockouts World Tag Team Championship	5:00
2	Steve Maclin defeated Frankie Kazarian (c) by pinfall	Singles match for the TNA International Championship	8:00
3	Tessa Blanchard (with Victoria Crawford) defeated Gia Miller (with Jody Threat) by pinfall	Singles match	6:00
4	Frankie Kazarian and Nic Nemeth co-won by pinning each other	22-person Intergender Call Your Shot Gauntlet; The winner(s) receives a trophy and a contract they can invoke anytime within one year for a championship match of their choosing.	26:17
5	Kelani Jordan (c) defeated Indi Hartwell by pinfall	Singles match for the TNA Knockouts World Championship	12:30
6	The System (Moose, Alisha Edwards, Brian Myers, Eddie Edwards, and JDC) defeated Order 4 (Mustafa Ali, Tasha Steelz, Special Agent 0, Jason Hotch, and John Skyler) by pinfall	10-person intergender Hardcore War	20:33
7	Leon Slater (c) vs. Je'Von Evans ended in no contest	Singles match for the TNA X-Division Championship	23:00
8	The Hardys (Matt Hardy and Jeff Hardy) (c) defeated Team 3D/The Dudley Boyz (Bully Ray and Devon) (Note: During the ring introductions, Bully Ray and Devon were announced as both Team 3D and the Dudley Boyz.)	"One Final Table" for the TNA World Tag Team Championship and NXT Tag Team Championship; This was Team 3D/The Dudley Boyz's retirement match.	15:45
9	Mike Santana defeated Trick Williams (c) by pinfall	Singles match for the TNA World Championship	16:15
(c) / – the champion(s) heading into the match; P / – the match was broadcast on the pre-show

=== Call Your Shot Gauntlet entrances and eliminations ===
– Winners

Call Your Shot Gauntlet entrants
Draw	Entrant		Eliminated by	Order	Eliminations
1	Léi Yǐng Lee		A. J. Francis	2	0
2	Mara Sadè		A. J. Francis	1	0
3	Ryan Nemeth		Nic Nemeth	19	2
4	Nic Nemeth		Co-Winner	—	4
5	Cedric Alexander		Eric Young	8	1
6	Rich Swann		A. J. Francis	3	0
7	A. J. Francis		The Rascalz and BDE	4	3
8	Travis Williams		Eric Young	5	0
9	BDE		Eric Young	6	1
10	The Rascalz (Note: All three members of the Rascalz were allowed to enter the Gauntlet and be considered as a single entry.)	Myron Reed	Nic Nemeth and Ryan Nemeth	14	1
10	The Rascalz	Trey Miguel	Cedric Alexander	7	1
10	The Rascalz	Zachary Wentz	Nic Nemeth and Ryan Nemeth	15	1
11	Dani Luna		The Home Town Man	11	1
12	Eric Young		Matt Cardona	17	4
13	Jake Something		The Home Town Man	9	0
14	Rosemary		Dani Luna	10	0
15	The Home Town Man		Eric Young	16	2
16	Zack Clayton		Matt Cardona	13	0
17	Frankie Kazarian (Note: Jody Threat was the original #17 entrant, but was attacked by Frankie Kazarian before entering the ring, and he would then take her spot.)		Co-Winner	—	0
18	Santino Marella		Nic Nemeth	12	0
19	Matt Cardona		Mance Warner	20	3
20	Mance Warner		Matt Cardona	18	1
