= Mustafa Ali =

American professional wrestler (born 1986)

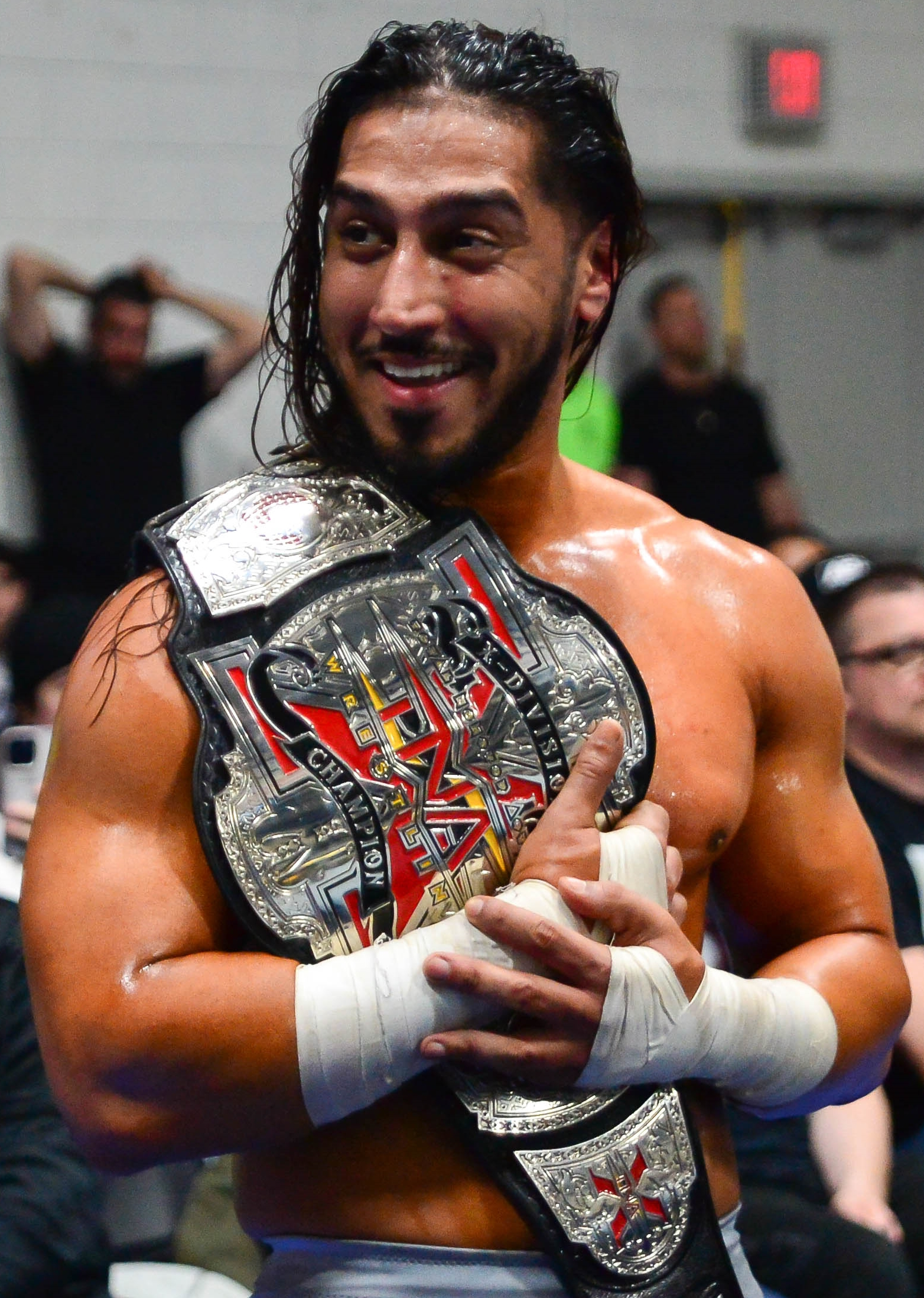
- Ali as TNA X Division Champion in 2024

Personal information
- Born: Adeel Alam; March 28, 1986 (age 40) Bolingbrook, Illinois, U.S.
- Spouse: Uzma Alam (m. 2011)
- Children: 3

Professional wrestling career
- Ring name(s): Ali; Alto; Mustafa Ali; Prince Ali
- Billed height: 5 ft 10 in (178 cm)
- Billed weight: 182 lb (83 kg)
- Billed from: Chicago, Illinois
- Debut: February 2, 2003

Adeel Alam (born March 28, 1986) is an American professional wrestler, better known by his ring name Mustafa Ali (/ˈmʌstəfə/ MUH-stə-fə). He is signed to Total Nonstop Action Wrestling (TNA), where he is a former two-time TNA International Champion and is a former one-time TNA X Division Champion. He also makes appearances on the independent circuit.

Alam began his professional wrestling career on the independent circuit in 2003, while also working as a police officer in a Chicago suburb for four years. In 2016, he competed in the Cruiserweight Classic as a replacement and through his performances, earned a full-time contract with WWE. He initially worked for their new cruiserweight division as part of the 205 Live brand. In December 2018, he was moved to the SmackDown brand, moving out of the cruiserweight division, where his ring name would be shortened to Ali from March 2019 to November 2019. In July 2020, he was moved to the Raw brand and in October of that same year, he revealed himself as the leader of the villainous stable Retribution. He would be released from WWE in September 2023, and returned to the independent circuit in December 2023. After briefly working with New Japan Pro-Wrestling (NJPW), he debuted for TNA in January 2024, and officially signed with the promotion in January the following year.

== Early life ==
Adeel Alam was born on March 28, 1986, in Bolingbrook, Illinois, to an Indian mother from New Delhi, and a Pakistani father from Karachi. He was raised in Chicago, Illinois along with his two older brothers. Alam wanted to be a wrestler since his youth, idolizing first Bret Hart and later also Eddie Guerrero, Rey Mysterio, Hardy Boyz, Chris Jericho, and Hayabusa.

== Professional wrestling career ==
=== Independent circuit (2003–2016) ===
Alam made his professional wrestling debut on February 2, 2003. He worked in various promotions, including Dreamwave Wrestling, where he was a former Dreamwave Alternative Champion and Dreamwave Heavyweight Champion. He also appeared in other promotions, including All American Wrestling (AAW), Freelance Wrestling, GALLI Lucha Libre, IWA Mid-South, Jersey All Pro Wrestling (JAPW), National Wrestling Alliance (NWA), Proving Ground Pro, and WrestleCircus. During his first six years as a professional wrestler, he used a mask so he would not face discrimination. He did it all during the day while working night shifts as a police officer.

=== WWE (2016–2023) ===
==== Cruiserweight division (2016–2018) ====
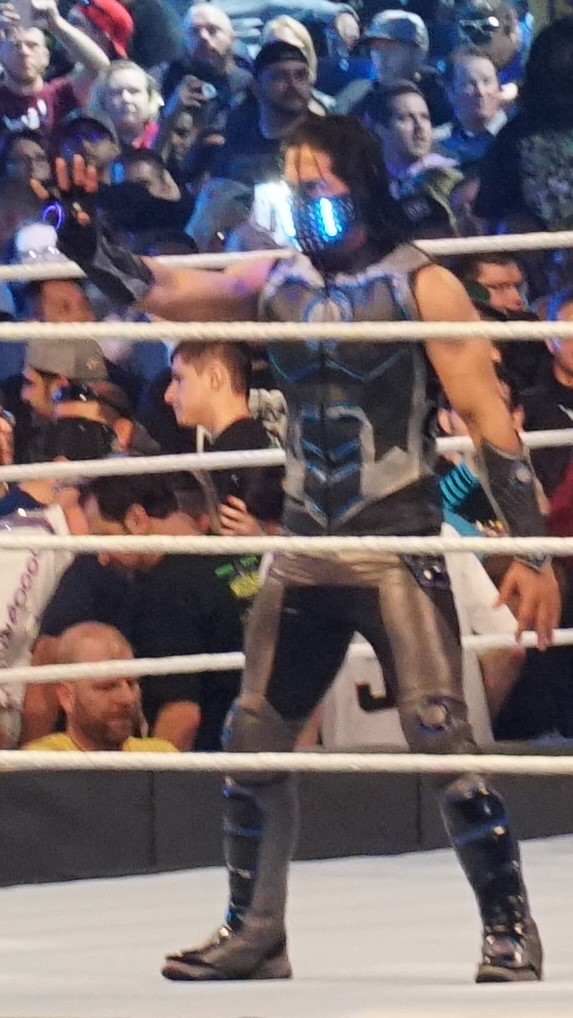
Ali making his entrance at WrestleMania 34.

On June 25, 2016, after Brazilian wrestler Zumbi was not able to participate in the Cruiserweight Classic tournament due to visa issues, WWE announced that Mustafa Ali would replace him. On July 20, Ali, representing his father's country of Pakistan, was eliminated from the tournament by Puerto Rican representative Lince Dorado in the first round. Ali appeared on the October 26 episode of NXT, where he and Dorado entered the Dusty Rhodes Tag Team Classic, but were eliminated by Kota Ibushi and TJ Perkins in the first round.

On the December 13 episode of 205 Live, Ali made his debut for the brand facing Lince Dorado in a rematch, which ended in a double countout. On January 23, 2017, Ali made his Raw debut, teaming with Jack Gallagher and TJ Perkins to defeat Ariya Daivari, Drew Gulak, and Tony Nese, thus establishing himself as a face. Ali began feuding with Drew Gulak, when Gulak began his "No Fly Zone" campaign on 205 Live. The feud culminated in a two-out-of-three falls match on July 18 episode of 205 Live, which Ali won. In February 2018, Ali began participating in the Cruiserweight Championship tournament; he defeated Gentleman Jack Gallagher in the first round, Buddy Murphy in the quarterfinals, and Drew Gulak in the semi-finals to advance to the final at the WrestleMania 34. At the event Ali lost to Cedric Alexander, thus failing to win the WWE Cruiserweight Championship. Ali then started a rivalry with Hideo Itami, who interfered in his match against Buddy Murphy. On the August 7 episode of 205 Live, Ali lost to Itami and collapsed afterwards, rendering him out of action for a short time. On the October 24 episode of 205 Live, Ali defeated Itami in a falls count anywhere match to end the feud. On the October 31 episode of 205 Live, Ali defeated Tony Nese to become the number one contender for the Cruiserweight Championship, but failed to win the title from Buddy Murphy at Survivor Series.

==== Championship pursuits (2018–2019) ====
During his time in 205 Live, Ali gained the attention of then-WWE Chairman Vince McMahon, who decided to put him on the SmackDown brand. According to former WWE writer Kazeem Famuyide, then-WWE Champion Daniel Bryan was pushing hard backstage for a "hot young babyface" to be on television, arguing that all the babyfaces they had been trying to push were forty year-olds; this led to management choosing Ali for this push. Ali made his first appearance on the December 11, 2018, episode of SmackDown Live, confronting and challenging Daniel Bryan to a match, which he lost. The following week, Ali officially became a member of SmackDown and scored his first win on the brand, teaming up with AJ Styles against Daniel Bryan and Andrade "Cien" Almas, where Ali pinned Bryan. At the Royal Rumble on January 27, 2019, Ali competed in the eponymous match, lasting 30 minutes and eliminating Shinsuke Nakamura and Samoa Joe, before being eliminated by Nia Jax. In February, Ali was scheduled to compete in the Elimination Chamber match for the WWE Championship at namesake event, which would have been his first world title match; however, he was pulled out due to a legitimate injury, and replaced by Kofi Kingston. Ali made his televised return at the Fastlane pay-per-view, as a last minute addition in the WWE Championship match between Daniel Bryan and Kevin Owens, which Ali lost after being pinned by Bryan. On March 25, 2019, his ring name was shortened to "Ali".

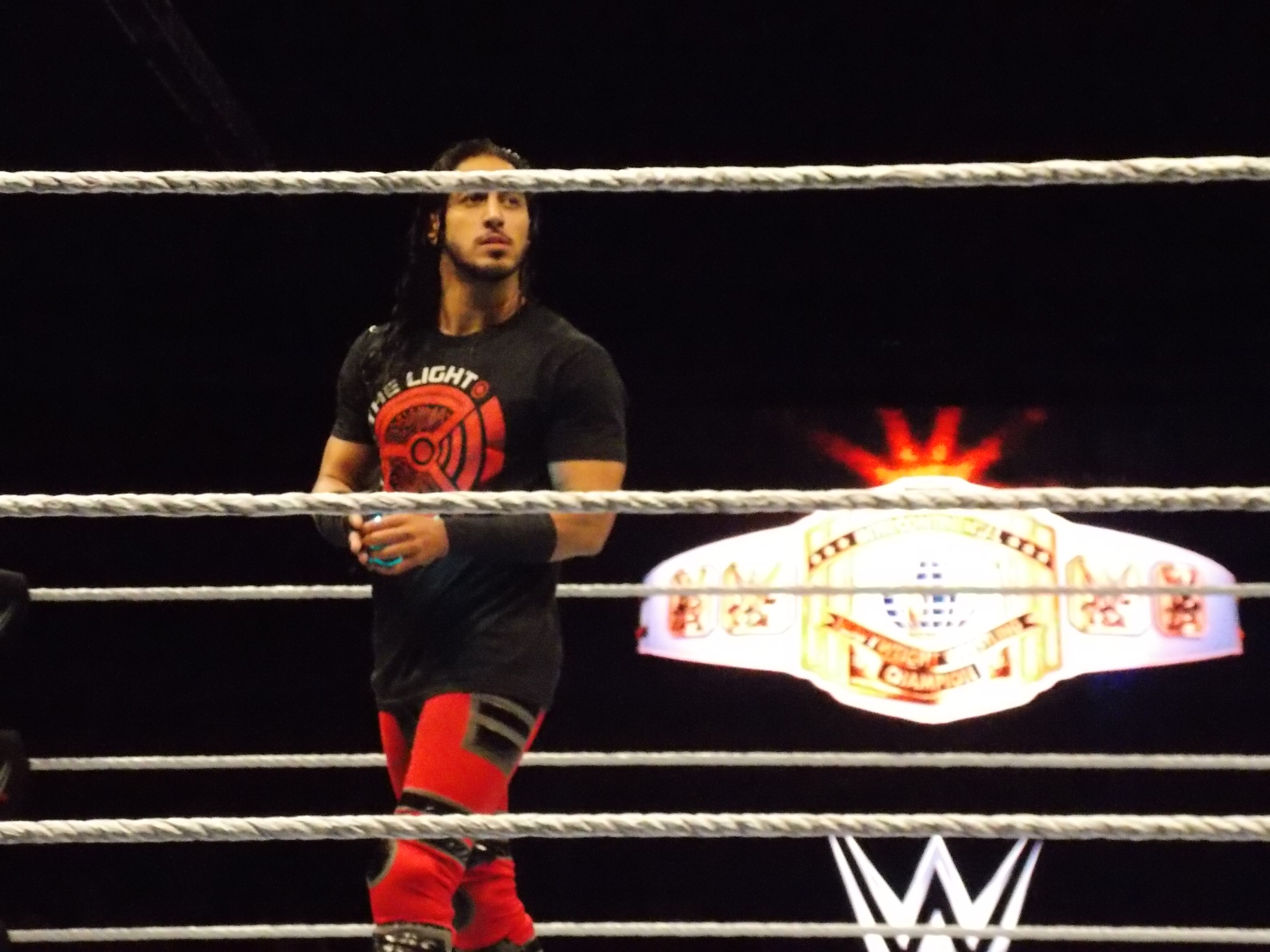
Ali at a live event in 2019.

At the Money in the Bank on May 19, Ali competed in the ladder match, which he failed to win, after a returning Brock Lesnar won the match. According to Ali, he was originally booked to win the match, but before making his entrance to the ring, was instructed by Vince McMahon to not obtain the briefcase. This decision caused a lot of controversy among fans, but Ali admitted to have not been bothered by it. The following month, Ali would compete in the 51-man battle royal at Super ShowDown, but would fail to win. At Smackville, Ali failed to capture the Intercontinental Championship, from Shinsuke Nakamura. In August, Ali competed in the King of the Ring tournament, where he defeated Buddy Murphy in the first round, but lost to Elias in the quarterfinals. At the Hell in a Cell event, Ali lost to Randy Orton. At the Crown Jewel event, Ali competed in a ten-man tag team match as a part of Team Hogan, coming out victorious against Team Flair. On November 13, his name was reverted to "Mustafa Ali". At Survivor Series, Ali competed as a member of Team SmackDown, and was eliminated by Seth Rollins, however, his team won the match. Following this, Ali would be taken off television, wrestling primarily on dark matches and live events.

==== Retribution (2020–2021) ====
After a seven-month hiatus from television, Ali returned on the July 20, 2020, episode of Raw, teaming with Cedric Alexander and Ricochet to defeat MVP, Bobby Lashley and Shelton Benjamin, thus moving to the Raw brand. After moving to the Raw brand, Ali later began competing on WWE Main Event, trading victories in matches over the likes of Ricochet and Akira Tozawa. On the September 28 episode of Raw, Ali would return to in ring action by teaming with Ricochet and Apollo Crews and they would go on to defeat The Hurt Business after Ali used the 450 splash to pin MVP.

On the October 5 episode of Raw, Ali turned heel when he was revealed as the leader of the stable Retribution. On the October 19 episode of Raw, Ali would reveal himself as the mysterious hacker that was sending messages on SmackDown for months. That same night, Ali and Retribution would be defeated by The Hurt Business in an eight-man tag team match. The following week on Raw, Retribution would once again lose to The Hurt Business in an elimination match, ending the feud. Following this, Retribution would set their sights on Ricochet with each member, including Ali, defeating him in singles matches over the next few weeks on Raw. Afterwards, Retribution would begin a feud with The New Day or more specifically, Kofi Kingston after Ali blamed Kingston for "stealing" his WrestleMania opportunity two years prior while he was injured. At the Royal Rumble, Ali would enter at number 4 and managed to eliminate Xavier Woods before being eliminated by Big E.

On March 15 episode of Raw, Ali faced Riddle for the United States Championship but was unsuccessful in capturing the title. He faced Riddle in a rematch for the title at Fastlane but was once again unsuccessful. Following the match, Reckoning and Slapjack walked out on him while Mace and T-Bar attacked him, effectively disbanding Retribution.

==== Various feuds (2021–2023) ====
In June, Ali began a storyline with Mansoor, trying to convince him that the rest of WWE superstars were "backstabbers", "would do anything just to get ahead", and "cheaters", leading to a match at Crown Jewel, where he was defeated. During his feud, as part of the 2021 Draft, Ali was drafted to the SmackDown brand.

On January 16, 2022, Mustafa Ali publicly requested his release from WWE which was eventually declined by Vince McMahon. A few months later, Ali returned to television on the April 25 episode of Raw, as a face, and defeated The Miz. after the match, he would be attacked by Ciampa. Heading into 2023, Ali started a program with Dolph Ziggler, with the two confronting each other backstage on several occasions. On the February 20, 2023, episode of Raw, Ali defeated Ziggler with a roll-up and sarcastically celebrated his win. On the May 15 episode of Raw, Ali won a No. 1 Contender's battle royal to face Intercontinental Champion Gunther at Night of Champions, but was unsuccessful at the event. Ali made a surprise return on the May 30 episode of NXT, appearing in the crowd just before North American Champion Wes Lee and Tyler Bate teamed up against The Dyad (Jagger Reid and Rip Fowler). Ali later helped Lee and Bate fend off Joe Gacy. At NXT The Great American Bash on July 30, Ali was unsuccessful in capturing the NXT North American Championship against Lee and defending champion Dominik Mysterio in a triple threat match after interference from Mysterio's Judgment Day stablemate, Rhea Ripley. On September 21, 2023, nine days before he was scheduled to challenge Dominik Mysterio for the NXT North American Championship at NXT No Mercy, Ali announced that he was no longer employed by WWE as he was one of several wrestlers released that day.

=== Return to independent circuit (2023–present) ===
On December 21, 2023, Ali announced that he would be taking independent bookings. On January 6, 2024, Ali made his first post-WWE appearance at Association les Professionnels du Catch's (APC) 20th Anniversary show, defeating Aigle Blanc. Ali also announced appearances with Game Changer Wrestling (GCW) at No Compadre on January 12, Progress Wrestling at Chapter 162: Light of The Dragon on January 28, and DEFY Wrestling on February 9. On February 18, Ali made his debut for Revolution Pro Wrestling (RevPro) at High Stakes, in a winning effort against Robbie X.

=== New Japan Pro-Wrestling (2024) ===
On January 13, 2024 at Battle in the Valley, Ali made his New Japan Pro-Wrestling (NJPW) debut in a pre-taped vignette, challenging Hiromu Takahashi to a match at Windy City Riot on April 12. At Windy City Riot, Ali defeated Takahashi. On August 29 at Capital Collision, Ali lost to Takahashi in a rematch.

=== Total Nonstop Action Wrestling (2024–present) ===
==== X-Division Champion (2024) ====
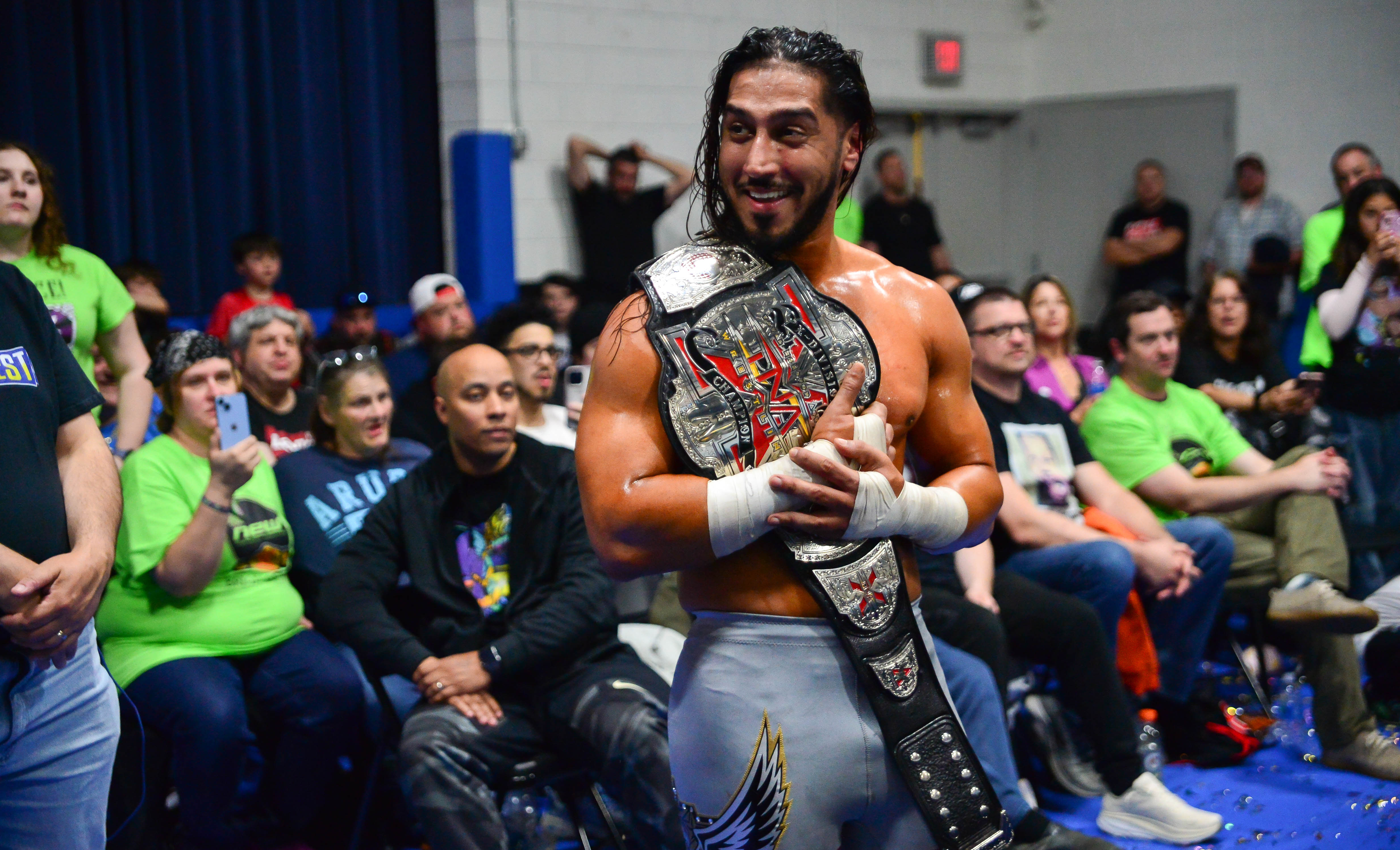
Ali as the TNA X Division Champion in 2024

Ali made his first appearance for Total Nonstop Action Wrestling (TNA) on the January 25 episode of TNA Impact!, in a pre-taped vignette. He made his in-ring debut at No Surrender, defeating Chris Sabin to win the TNA X Division Championship. This marked Ali's first championship in a major company (also being the first in TNA's history to win the title in his debut match). He retained the title against Jake Something, Ace Austin, and Trent Seven on TNA PPVs. At Slammiversary, he lost the title to Mike Bailey, ending his reign at 148 days and marking his first loss in TNA, as well as his first overall loss since 2023. On the August 1 episode of Impact!, Ali unsuccessfully challenged Nic Nemeth for the TNA World Championship. On the same day, Ali announced that he would be leaving TNA.

==== Order 4 (2025–2026) ====
On the January 23, 2025 episode of Impact!, Ali returned to TNA, where he interrupted Mike Santana and announced that he had signed a contract with the promotion. Following his return, Ali would form a stable with Tasha Steelz and The Good Hands (Jason Hotch and John Skyler) called "Order 4" and would enter a feud with Mike Santana, where Ali would mock Santana for his past as a former alcoholic. This would lead to a match at Sacrifice, where Ali would cheat to defeat Santana. Due to this, it would lead to a rematch on the following episode of Impact!, where Mike Santana would defeat Ali by countout. At Rebellion, Santana defeated Ali in a Falls Count Anywhere match to end the feud. At Under Siege, Order 4 defeated Raj Singh, Indi Hartwell, and The Rascalz (Trey Miguel and Zachary Wentz) in an eight-person mixed tag team match. At Against All Odds, Ali defeated Jason Hotch. At Slammiversary, Ali defeated Cedric Alexander. At Emergence, Ali lost to Matt Cardona. At Victory Road, Ali defeated Moose with Order 4 gaining the advantage in Hardcore War at Bound for Glory. Ali appeared on the September 30, 2025 episode of WWE NXT, where he confronted NXT North American Champion Ethan Page and challenged him to a title match the following week at Showdown, a TNA/NXT crossover event. At Bound for Glory, Order 4 lost to The System (Moose, Alisha Edwards, Brian Myers, Eddie Edwards, and JDC). At Turning Point, Order 4 (Ali, John Skyler, and Jason Hotch) defeated Cedric Alexander and The Hardys (Jeff Hardy and Matt Hardy). At Final Resolution, Order 4 lost to The Rascalz (Trey Miguel, Zachary Wentz, Myron Reed, and Dezmond Xavier). At Genesis, Ali defeated Elijah. At No Surrender, Order 4 defeated The Hardys (Jeff Hardy and Matt Hardy) and The Righteous (Vincent and Dutch). At Sacrifice, Order 4 (Ali and Tasha Steelz) defeated Trey Miguel and Jada Stone.

==== International Champion (2026–present) ====
At Rebellion, Ali defeated Trey Miguel to win the TNA International Championship. He would hold the title until the July 30 episode of Impact! where he lost the title to Jason Hotch ending his reign at 110 days. At Lockdown, Ali regained the TNA International title from Hotch.

Order 4 would start to fall apart in the lead-up to Bound for Glory, with Mila Moore and John Skyler walking out on the group on the September 24 episode of Impact!. On the October 1 episode of Impact!, Ali and Special Agent 0 would defeat Skyler and Jason Hotch in a tag team match. After the match, Steelz turned on Ali by ordering Special Agent 0 to attack him. At Bound for Glory, Ali lost the title back to Hotch in a four-way match that also included Special Agent 0 and Skyler, ending his second reign at 49 days.

== Professional wrestling style and persona ==
Ali uses a high-flying style of wrestling. Ali's finishing maneuver was an imploding 450° splash named the 054, but he retired the move and replaced it with the standard 450° splash since he "wants to be able to play with his grandkids". After his debut, Ali used characters different from Muslim stereotypes. During his feud with Cedric Alexander over the Cruiserweight Championship, Ali was commonly referred to as "The Heart of 205 Live", while Alexander was referred to as "The Soul of 205 Live". Following his heel turn, he would add the Koji clutch to his move set.

After leaving WWE, Ali began a new gimmick, where he portrayed a politician and would walk around with bodyguards dressed as members of the United States Secret Service. He would also use the slogan "In Ali We Trust!" as his catchphrase. Ali had previously tried to use this gimmick in WWE but was rejected by the creative team.

== Other media ==
Ali made his video game debut as a playable character in WWE 2K19 and has since appeared in WWE 2K20, WWE 2K22, and WWE 2K23. He was the subject of a 2009 documentary focusing on issues that Muslim wrestlers face when booked as villainous characters and stereotyped as terrorists.

== Personal life ==
Prior to signing with WWE, Alam spent four years serving as a police officer in Homewood, Illinois, a suburb south of Chicago, working nighttime shifts while competing on the independent circuit in order to support his family.

Despite having Pakistani and Indian roots, Alam only represented Pakistan in his WWE debut at the Cruiserweight Classic as there were already The Bollywood Boyz as Indian representatives competing. He was criticized for not displaying a Pakistani flag and representing the country by his Pakistani fans in January 2017. He stated, "I don't care for nationality. I care for unity. I don't mean to offend anyone. This is just me stating that I feel nationality doesn't define us as people, it separates us."

Alam is a devout Muslim. He has been married to his wife Uzma since January 2011, and they have two daughters and a son.

In 2024, Alam opened his own professional wrestling school called Chicago Wrestling Center in Forest Park, Illinois.

== Championships and accomplishments ==
- Dreamwave Wrestling
  - Dreamwave Alternative Championship (2 times)
  - Dreamwave World Championship (1 time)
- Freelance Wrestling
  - Freelance World Championship (1 time)
- Jersey All Pro Wrestling
  - JAPW Light Heavyweight Championship (1 time)
- Pro Wrestling Illustrated
  - Ranked No. 19 of the top 500 wrestlers in the PWI 500 in 2024
  - Indie Wrestler of the Year (2024)
- Proving Ground Pro
  - PGP Franchise Championship (1 time)
- Total Nonstop Action Wrestling
  - TNA X Division Championship (1 time)
  - TNA International Championship (2 times)
  - TNA Year End Awards (2 times)
    - X Division Star of the Year (2024)
    - Match of the Year (2025) vs. Mike Santana at Rebellion
- WrestleCrap
  - Gooker Award (2020) – as part of Retribution
