= TNA Against All Odds (2025) =

Professional wrestling event

Against All Odds
- Promotion: Total Nonstop Action Wrestling
- Date: June 6, 2025
- City: Tempe, Arizona
- Venue: Mullett Arena

TNA+ Monthly Specials chronology
← Previous; Under Siege	Next → Emergence

Against All Odds chronology
← Previous; 2024	Next → Last

The 2025 Against All Odds was a professional wrestling event produced by Total Nonstop Action Wrestling (TNA). It took place on June 6, 2025, at the Mullett Arena in Tempe, Arizona, and aired on TNA+. It was the 14th event under the Against All Odds chronology. Wrestlers from WWE's NXT brand, with which TNA has a partnership, also appeared at the event.

Nine matches were contested at the event, including one on the Countdown to Against All Odds pre-show. In the main event, NXT wrestler Trick Williams defeated Elijah to retain the TNA World Championship. In other prominent matches, Santino Marella defeated Sheriff Stone to remain the TNA Director of Authority, and Masha Slamovich defeated Léi Yǐng Lee to retain the TNA Knockouts World Championship. The event was notable for the TNA returns of The IInspiration (Cassie Lee and Jessie McKay) and Killer Kelly.

== Production ==
=== Background ===
Against All Odds is an annual professional wrestling event originally produced by Total Nonstop Action Wrestling (TNA) between 2005 and 2012. In 2013, TNA discontinued most of its monthly pay-per-view events in favor of the new pre-recorded One Night Only events. It was revived as a special episode of Impact! that aired in 2019, and has been a monthly special for TNA+ since the 2021 event. On April 2, 2025, TNA announced that Against All Odds would take place on June 6 at the Mullett Arena in Tempe, Arizona.

=== Storylines ===
The event will feature several professional wrestling matches that involved different wrestlers from pre-existing scripted feuds, plots, and storylines. Wrestlers portray heroes, villains, or less distinguishable characters in scripted events that build tension and culminate in a wrestling match or series of matches. Storylines are produced on TNA's weekly programs, Impact! and Xplosion.

At NXT Battleground, NXT wrestler Trick Williams defeated Joe Hendry to win the TNA World Championship, becoming the first active WWE wrestler to hold any TNA title. Two days later on the May 27 episode of NXT, Williams would cut his first promo as champion, where he vowed to turn TNA into "TrickNA" while disparaging former TNA World Champions such as Kurt Angle and AJ Styles. He would later be confronted by Mike Santana, who appeared in a backstage segment at Battleground and just made his NXT in-ring debut earlier. He called Williams out for being "fake" as he declared he'd take the TNA World Championship from Williams. TNA Director of Authority Santino Marella would appear on the Titantron to announce that, per NXT General Manager Ava, Williams would defend the title against Santana on the following episode of NXT. However, the following day on Busted Open Radio, co-host and TNA Senior Producer Tommy Dreamer announced that the TNA World Championship would also be defended at Against All Odds. That match was later confirmed on the subsequent episode of TNA Impact!, where either Williams or Santana would defend the title against Joe Hendry's ally Elijah at the event. On the June 3 episode of NXT, Williams defeated Santana to retain the title due to interference from Fir$t Cla$$ (A. J. Francis and KC Navarro), thus it was announced that Williams would defend the title against Elijah at Against All Odds. Meanwhile, Santana, who defeated Francis at Under Siege two weeks ago, was announced as a guest on Francis and Navarro's talk show, "Fir$t Cla$$ Penthouse."

At Under Siege, Masha Slamovich successfully defended the TNA Knockouts World Championship against Victoria Crawford. Afterwards, she would nominate Léi Yǐng Lee as her next challenger, but was rebuffed by Robert Stone, who said that Lee needed to earn her opportunity on the upcoming episode of TNA Impact!. She would go on to defeat TNA Knockouts World Tag Team Champion Ash by Elegance before once again being challenged by Slamovich. The match was later made official for Against All Odds.

On the May 29 episode of TNA Impact!, The Rascalz (Trey Miguel and Zachary Wentz) defeated The System (Brian Myers and Eddie Edwards), Fir$t Cla$$ (A. J. Francis and KC Navarro), and Laredo Kid (whose partner Octagón Jr. was ambushed by The System backstage) to earn a TNA World Tag Team Championship match. It was then announced that they would challenge The Nemeth Brothers (Nic Nemeth and Ryan Nemeth) for the titles at Against All Odds.

On the May 1 episode of TNA Impact!, NXT Assistant General Manager Robert Stone (formerly Robbie E in TNA) confronted TNA Director of Authority Santino Marella alongside Victoria Crawford. Claiming Marella to be "under review" by the "higher ups" at Anthem Sports & Entertainment, Stone announced that Crawford would serve as "Deputy" Director of Authority while he would act as the liaison between TNA and Anthem. Now calling himself "Sheriff Stone," he would overrule Marella's decisions while gaining support from Tessa Blanchard, who had been critical of Marella's leadership, and detraction from Marella's daughter Arianna Grace, the liaison between TNA and NXT. This soon led to a match between Blanchard and Grace at Under Siege, which Blanchard won. On the following TNA Impact!, Marella and Grace faced Stone and Crawford in an intergender tag team match, but due to several caveats put in place by Stone and interference by Alisha Edwards, the latter team won. Later, in a digital exclusive segment, an enraged Marella challenged Stone to a singles match at Against All Odds, with the winner taking the role of TNA Director of Authority from then on.

After losing to Mike Santana in a falls count anywhere match at Rebellion, Mustafa Ali started a downward spiral where he became more aggressive towards opponents of him and his cabinet Order 4 (The Great Hands (John Skyler and Jason Hotch) and Tasha Steelz). Almost unhinged, he would blindly attack the likes of Ace Austin and The Rascalz whilst using members of Order 4 to protect him, albeit seemingly against their will. At Under Siege, Order 4 defeated The Rascalz, Indi Hartwell, and a returning Raj Singh (replacing an injured Austin), but Ali continued to attack Singh after the match. Steelz tried to calm him down, but was surprisingly shoved down by Ali. Signs of Ali's abusive behavior were seen again on the following TNA Impact!, where, as he ordered The Great Hands to attack Singh after a match, he grabbed Steelz by the hair and threatened her. The next week, Steelz lost to Hartwell after Hotch refused to attack the latter. Ali would come out and shove both Steelz and the referee to the ground before Hotch jumped in between him and Steelz. Backstage, Ali declared that he and Hotch would face in a match at Against All Odds.

== Reception ==
Chris Vetter of Pro Wrestling Dot Net gave praise to Mustafa-Hotch as the best match on the card, followed by the Knockouts World Title and International Title matches, felt that both the World Tag Title and Kazarian-Hendry bouts were "merely fine", and was critical of Elijah's placement in the World Title main event, calling the show "fun but nothing must-see." Kristian Thompson of TJR Wrestling praised both the Knockouts World Title and Ali-Hotch bouts for the performances of Lee and Hotch respectively, called the Elijah-Williams World Title match "one of the weaker PLE main events in recent memory", and felt that Stone-Marella "started off entertaining and turned into a near-disaster" towards the end. He gave the event a 7 out of 10, concluding that: "Overall, a solid night for TNA with some cool returns, especially in the women's division." Thomas Hall of 411Mania gave the event a 7.5 out of 10, saying "[T]his show didn't have the highest expectations coming in and it wound up being a completely watchable event. It's nothing that you need to see but if you watched it, you would not have had a bad time." Theo Sambus, also writing for 411Mania, praised Ali-Hotch for being a "great showing" of the latter's performance, Hendry-Kazarian for being a "strong outing from [the]se two vets", and the other undercard bouts being enjoyable, but found the Director of Authority match the "obvious low point of the show" and critiqued that the main event "felt underwhelming" with a "few awkward spots". Sambus gave the event a 6.8 out of 10, concluding with: "Shame to end on that note, but there's enough to cherry pick a good watch if you're a TNA+ subscriber."

== Aftermath ==
On the subsequent episode of TNA Impact!, TNA Director of Authority Santino Marella announced that Moose will defend the X Division Championship against Leon Slater at Slammiversary.

== Results ==
No.	Results	Stipulations	Times
1^{P}	The Elegance Brand (Ash by Elegance, Heather by Elegance, and M by Elegance) (with The Personal Concierge) defeated Xia Brookside, Harley Hudson, and Myla Grace by pinfall	Six-woman tag team match	5:16
2	Steve Maclin (c) defeated Mance Warner (with Steph De Lander) by pinfall	Singles match for the TNA International Championship	9:39
3	The Hardys (Jeff Hardy and Matt Hardy), Leon Slater, and The Home Town Man defeated The System (Moose, JDC, Eddie Edwards and Brian Myers) (with Alisha Edwards) by pinfall	Eight-man tag team match	12:35
4	Mustafa Ali (with John Skyler and Tasha Steelz) defeated Jason Hotch by pinfall	Singles match	13:41
5	Masha Slamovich (c) defeated Léi Yǐng Lee by pinfall	Singles match for the TNA Knockouts World Championship	12:47
6	Frankie Kazarian defeated Joe Hendry by pinfall	Singles match	12:41
7	The Nemeth Brothers (Nic Nemeth and Ryan Nemeth) (c) defeated The Rascalz (Trey Miguel and Zachary Wentz) by pinfall	Tag team match for the TNA World Tag Team Championship	12:43
8	Santino Marella (with Arianna Grace) defeated Sheriff Stone (with Tessa Blanchard and Victoria Crawford) by pinfall	Singles match with Matt Cardona as special guest referee Winner is the official TNA Director of Authority.	9:48
9	Trick Williams (c) defeated Elijah by pinfall	Singles match for the TNA World Championship	16:16
(c) / – the champion(s) heading into the match; P / – the match was broadcast on the pre-show
