= TNA Against All Odds (2024) =

2024 TNA Wrestling event

Against All Odds
- Promotion: Total Nonstop Action Wrestling
- Date: June 14, 2024
- City: Cicero, Illinois
- Venue: Cicero Stadium

TNA+ Monthly Specials chronology
← Previous; Under Siege	Next → Emergence

Against All Odds chronology
← Previous; 2023	Next → 2025

The 2024 Against All Odds was a professional wrestling event produced by Total Nonstop Action Wrestling (TNA). It took place on June 14, 2024, at the Cicero Stadium in Cicero, Illinois, and aired on TNA+. It was the 13th event under the Against All Odds chronology.

Ten matches were contested at the event, including two on the Countdown to Against All Odds pre-show. In the main event, Moose defeated "Broken" Matt Hardy in a Broken Rules match to retain the TNA World Championship. In other prominent matches, Jordynne Grace defeated WWE NXT's Tatum Paxley to retain the TNA Knockouts World Championship, Mustafa Ali defeated Trent Seven to retain the TNA X Division Championship, and The System (Brian Myers and Eddie Edwards) defeated The Nemeth Brothers (Nic Nemeth and Ryan Nemeth) to retain the TNA World Tag Team Championship. The event was also notable for the return of Jeff Hardy to TNA.

== Production ==
=== Background ===
Against All Odds was an annual professional wrestling event produced by Total Nonstop Action Wrestling (TNA) between 2005 and 2012. In 2013, TNA discontinued most of its monthly pay-per-view events in favor of the new pre-recorded One Night Only events. It was revived as a special episode of Impact! that aired in 2019, and has been a monthly special for TNA+ since the 2021 event. On April 11, 2024, TNA announced that Against All Odds would take place on June 14 at Cicero Stadium in Cicero, Illinois.

=== Storylines ===
The event will feature several professional wrestling matches that involved different wrestlers from pre-existing scripted feuds, plots, and storylines. Wrestlers portray heroes, villains, or less distinguishable characters in scripted events that build tension and culminate in a wrestling match or series of matches. Storylines are produced on TNA's weekly programs, Impact! and Xplosion.

At Rebellion, Moose retained the TNA World Championship over Nic Nemeth. However, when Moose and his stable, The System (Brian Myers, Eddie Edwards, and Alisha Edwards), were about to celebrate, he was ambushed by "Broken" Matt Hardy, making his first TNA appearance since 2021. On the following episode of TNA Impact!, Hardy and Nemeth met in the ring – the former making his world title aspirations clear – as they made a pact to "delete" The System. Later in the main event, Edwards defeated Nemeth before The System took Nemeth out with a chair. Nemeth was scheduled to take part in a six-man tag team match at Under Siege, teaming with Speedball Mountain (Trent Seven and Mike Bailey) against The System, but his subsequent injury led to Hardy taking his place. The System would defeat Hardy and Speedball Mountain on the night. The System would have a "Championship Celebration" on the following TNA Impact! to celebrate their win at Under Siege and their championship accomplishments (Moose as TNA World Champion, Myers and Eddie as TNA World Tag Team Champions, and Alisha recently becoming TNA Knockouts World Tag Team Champion). They were quickly interrupted by Hardy, however, making it clear that he was not finished with them. Hardy then attacked, but when The System nearly had the upper hand, they were stopped by Ryan Nemeth, Nic Nemeth's younger brother. Two weeks later, Hardy and Ryan defeated Myers and Edwards in a non-title match, and when Moose came out to partake in a post-match assault, Nic Nemeth returned to even the odds. After that match, TNA Director of Authority Santino Marella would grant Hardy and Ryan a TNA World Tag Team Championship match at Against All Odds. However, Hardy made it clear he was in TNA for the world title, so Marella granted him an opportunity against Moose while giving the tag team title match to Ryan and Nic Nemeth.

On the May 9 TNA Impact!, Speedball Mountain (Trent Seven and Mike Bailey) defeated ABC (Ace Austin and Chris Bey) to determine who would face each other for a TNA X Division Championship match against Mustafa Ali at Against All Odds. They would face two weeks later, where after a distraction from Ali and interference by Champagne Singh, Seven defeated Bailey to become number one contender.

At Rebellion, Mike Santana made his return to TNA and defeated Steve Maclin in an impromptu match. On the subsequent episode of TNA Impact!, Santana defeated Myron Reed of The Rascalz before being confronted by Maclin, who had been in an alliance with The Rascalz for the previous weeks. However, The Rascalz bailed on Maclin before they could execute an attack, leaving Maclin alone and in retreat of Santana. On the May 30 TNA Impact!, Santana and Maclin would have a rematch, but that ended in a no contest after an attack by The Rascalz (Trey Miguel and Zachary Wentz) on both men. The following week, Maclin confronted Santana backstage, but this time to ask him to team with him against The Rascalz at Against All Odds. Despite hesitating and wanting to focus on his singles career, Santana accepted Maclin's proposal.

At Under Siege, Jonathan Gresham returned to TNA under a new persona dubbed "The Octopus", a black mask-wearing figure that had been haunting Gresham in the preceding weeks via vignettes. He would defeat Kushida with a mandible claw after his hand coated in black ink he spewed from his mouth. The ink subsequently sickened Kushida and the referee of their match, who had assisted Kushida. A few weeks later on the May 30 episode of TNA Impact!, Gresham defeated Sami Callihan after a low blow, despite Callihan stopping Gresham from spewing his ink. The following week, a frustrated Callihan called out Gresham on his "DMTV" segment to a match at Against All Odds, which TNA made official for the Countdown pre-show.

== Results ==
No.	Results	Stipulations	Times
1^{P}	Sami Callihan defeated Jonathan Gresham by pinfall	Singles match	2:23
2^{P}	The Malisha (Alisha Edwards and Masha Slamovich) (c) defeated The Hex (Allysin Kay and Marti Belle) by pinfall	Tag team match for the TNA Knockouts World Tag Team Championship	7:59
3	Steve Maclin and Mike Santana defeated The Rascalz (Trey Miguel and Zachary Wentz) by pinfall	Tag team match	12:51
4	PCO defeated Rich Swann (with A. J. Francis) by pinfall	Singles match	5:50
5	The System (Brian Myers and Eddie Edwards) (c) defeated The Nemeth Brothers (Nic Nemeth and Ryan Nemeth) (with Dirty Dango) by pinfall	Tag team match for the TNA World Tag Team Championship	12:36
6	Frankie Kazarian defeated Joe Hendry by pinfall	Singles match	7:26
7	Mustafa Ali (c) defeated Trent Seven by submission	Singles match for the TNA X Division Championship	15:33
8	ABC (Ace Austin and Chris Bey) defeated Eric Young and Josh Alexander by pinfall	Tag team match	18:17
9	Jordynne Grace (c) defeated Tatum Paxley by pinfall	Singles match for the TNA Knockouts World Championship	11:14
10	Moose (c) (with Alisha Edwards) defeated "Broken" Matt Hardy by pinfall	Broken Rules match for the TNA World Championship	21:32
(c) / – the champion(s) heading into the match; P / – the match was broadcast on the pre-show
