= Impact Wrestling Against All Odds (2023) =

2023 Impact Wrestling event

Against All Odds
- Promotional poster
- Promotion: Impact Wrestling
- Date: June 9, 2023
- City: Columbus, Ohio
- Venue: Ohio Expo Center and State Fairgrounds

Impact Plus Monthly Specials chronology
← Previous; Under Siege	Next → Emergence

Against All Odds chronology
← Previous; 2022	Next → 2024

The 2023 Against All Odds was a professional wrestling event produced by Impact Wrestling. It took place on June 9, 2023, at the Ohio Expo Center in Columbus, Ohio, and aired on Impact Plus and YouTube. It was the 12th event under the Against All Odds chronology.

Eleven matches were contested at the event, including two on the pre-show and one taped as a digital exclusive. In the main event, Alex Shelley defeated Steve Maclin to win the Impact World Championship. In other prominent matches, Ohio Versus Everything (Sami Callihan, Jake Crist, and Madman Fulton) defeated The Design (Deaner, Angels, and Kon) in an Ohio Street Fight, Nick Aldis won an 8-4-1 match to become the number one contender to the Impact World Championship at Slammiversary, and Chris Sabin defeated Trey Miguel to win the Impact X Division Championship.

== Production ==
=== Background ===
Against All Odds was an annual professional wrestling event produced by Impact Wrestling (then known as Total Nonstop Action Wrestling (TNA)) between 2005 and 2012. In 2013, TNA discontinued most of its monthly pay-per-view events in favor of the new pre-recorded One Night Only events. It was revived as a special episode of Impact! that aired in 2019, and has been a monthly special for Impact Plus since the 2021 event. On April 4, 2023, Impact Wrestling announced that Against All Odds would take place on June 9, 2023, at the Ohio Expo Center in Columbus, Ohio.

=== Storylines ===
Other on-screen personnel
Role	Name
Commentators	Tom Hannifan
Commentators	Matthew Rehwoldt
Commentators	Santino Marella (Pre-show; Impact Digital Media Championship match)
Ring announcer	David Penzer
Referees	Allison Leigh
Referees	Daniel Spencer
Referees	Frank Gastineau
Interviewers	Gia Miller
Interviewers	Jimmy Jacobs

The event featured several professional wrestling matches that involved different wrestlers from pre-existing scripted feuds, plots, and storylines. Wrestlers portrayed heroes, villains, or less distinguishable characters in scripted events that build tension and culminate in a wrestling match or series of matches. Storylines were produced on Impact's weekly television program.

At Under Siege, Alex Shelley won a six-way match to become the number one contender to the Impact World Championship at Against All Odds. During the main event of Under Siege, Steve Maclin successfully retained his Impact World Championship by defeating PCO in a no disqualification match, making him Shelley's opponent for the event.

On May 30, Impact announced for Against All Odds the first ever "8-4-1 match", with the winner becoming the number one contender to the Impact World Championship at Slammiversary. The participants are: Bully Ray, Jonathan Gresham, Heath, Mike Bailey, Moose, Nick Aldis, PCO, and Rich Swann.

The rules of the 8-4-1 match are as follows:

- The match begins as an eight-man tag team match (Ray, Gresham, Heath, and Aldis vs. Bailey, Moose, PCO, and Swann).
- The winning team then advances to a four-way match.
- The winner of the four-way match receives a match for the Impact World Championship at Slammiversary.

At Under Siege, Trey Miguel retained the Impact X Division Championship against Chris Sabin after blinding the latter with spray paint away while the referee's back was turned. As a result, Sabin will receive a rematch for Miguel's title at Against All Odds.

After being on opposite sides of teams in Hardcore War at Rebellion, Killer Kelly and Masha Slamovich have been embroiled in a fierce rivalry. On the May 11 episode of Impact!, Slamovich pinned Kelly in a match while trapped in the latter's Killer Clutch submission, though Kelly refused to release the hold afterwards. Some weeks later on May 25 and into Under Siege, the two were found to be brawling throughout the crowd, with a chain being used as a weapon by both women. As a result, Impact announced that Kelly and Slamovich will face off again in a dog collar match at Against All Odds.

On the May 11 Impact!, Brian Myers aligned himself with The Good Hands (Jason Hotch and John Skyler) after helping them win their match, promising to take the young team to the Impact World Tag Team Championship. That initially started well for them as the following week, Hotch defeated Ace Austin, one half of the tag team champions ABC, after an assist from Skyler and Myers. However, the week after, Austin's partner Chris Bey avenged the loss after defeating Skyler. Even with the setback, Myers and The Good Hands still staked a claim to the titles, with Impact announcing that they'll receive a title opportunity against ABC at Against All Odds.

After previous disputes during a six-man tag team match prior to Under Siege, Eddie Edwards and Frankie Kazarian entered into a feud. Following Under Siege, Edwards defeated Yuya Uemura in singles competition; but after Edwards baited Uemura into a handshake, Kazarian confronted him on the entrance ramp, calling Edwards a bad locker room leader. After being shoved by Edwards, Kazarian laid him out with one punch before throwing off Eddie's wife Alisha Edwards when she tried jumping on him. Later, Impact announced that Edwards and Kazarian will meet in a match at Against All Odds.

On the May 18 Impact!, Dirty Dango was revealed as Director of Authority Santino Marella's attacker, before later putting down Impact Digital Media Champion Joe Hendry, who had been helping him. A week later on the Under Siege pre-show, Hendry defended his championship against Dango, winning by disqualification after Dango hit him with a low blow. Dango would've continued his assault had it not been for a returning Marella's intervention. On the subsequent Impact!, it was announced that Hendry and Dango will have a rematch at Against All Odds.

Trinity made her Impact debut on the May 4 episode of Impact!, setting her sights on Impact Knockouts World Champion Deonna Purrazzo, who would later confront her in the ring. However, Trinity would soon find herself on the bad side of Gisele Shaw, especially after Shaw's stylist Jai Vidal took a selfie with Trinity. The two women would face off at Under Siege, where Trinity defeated Shaw. The following week on Impact!, Trinity defeated Shaw's bodyguard Savannah Evans before immediately challenging Purrazzo to a Knockouts World Championship match at Slammiversary, which Purrazzo accepted. They were soon jumped by Shaw, Evans, and Vidal, but were able to fend them off with an assist from Jordynne Grace. Impact later announced that Purrazzo and Trinity will team up in a tag team match against Shaw and Evans at Against All Odds.

At Under Siege, Jake Crist returned to Impact, teaming with former Ohio Versus Everything (oVe) stablemate Sami Callihan and Rich Swann to defeat The Design (Deaner, Kon, and Angels). The following week on Impact!, Crist and Callihan defeated Kon and Angels in a tag team match, only to be jumped from behind by The Design before Swann ran them off. On June 5, Impact announced that Callihan, Crist, and a returning Madman Fulton will team up as oVe to battle The Design in an Ohio Street Fight.

== Aftermath ==
Due to Nick Aldis winning the 8-4-1 match and Alex Shelley winning the Impact World Championship at Against All Odds, a match was set between Shelley and Aldis for the title at Slammiversary. However, a rematch was set between Shelley and Maclin for the title for the Down Under Tour, which Shelley won to retain the title.

== Results ==
No.	Results	Stipulations	Times
1^{D}	Yuya Uemura defeated Sheldon Jean (with Kenny King) by pinfall (Note: The match was taped for an Impact Digital Exclusive that aired on June 13.)	Singles match	5:20
2^{P}	KiLynn King (with Taylor Wilde) defeated Nevaeh by pinfall	Singles match	5:02
3^{P}	Joe Hendry (c) defeated Dirty Dango by pinfall	Singles match for the Impact Digital Media Championship	6:29
4	Frankie Kazarian defeated Eddie Edwards (with Alisha Edwards) by pinfall	Singles match	12:30
5	ABC (Ace Austin and Chris Bey) (c) defeated The Good Hands (Jason Hotch and John Skyler) (with Brian Myers) by pinfall	Tag team match for the Impact World Tag Team Championship	9:43
6	Masha Slamovich defeated Killer Kelly by pinfall	Dog Collar match	11:51
7	Chris Sabin defeated Trey Miguel (c) by pinfall	Singles match for the Impact X Division Championship	13:12
8	Nick Aldis defeated Bully Ray, Heath, Jonathan Gresham, Mike Bailey, Moose, PCO, and Rich Swann	8-4-1 match to determine the #1 contender to the Impact World Championship at Slammiversary: Phase 1: Eight-man tag team match - Bully Ray, Heath, Jonathan Gresham, and Nick Aldis defeated Mike Bailey, Moose, PCO, and Rich Swann by pinfall; Phase 2: Four-way match - Nick Aldis defeated Bully Ray, Heath, and Jonathan Gresham by submission	19:06
9	Deonna Purrazzo and Trinity defeated Gisele Shaw and Savannah Evans (with Jai Vidal) by pinfall	Tag team match	10:03
10	Ohio Versus Everything (Sami Callihan, Jake Crist, and Madman Fulton) defeated The Design (Deaner, Angels, and Kon) by pinfall	Ohio Street Fight	14:53
11	Alex Shelley defeated Steve Maclin (c) by pinfall	Singles match for the Impact World Championship	22:41
(c) / – the champion(s) heading into the match; D / – this was a dark match; P / – the match was broadcast on the pre-show
