= Impact Wrestling Against All Odds (2022) =

2022 Impact Wrestling event

Against All Odds
- Promotional poster featuring Josh Alexander and Joe Doering
- Promotion: Impact Wrestling
- Date: July 1, 2022
- City: Atlanta, Georgia
- Venue: Center Stage

Impact Plus Monthly Specials chronology
← Previous; Under Siege	Next → Emergence

Against All Odds chronology
← Previous; 2021	Next → 2023

The 2022 Against All Odds was a professional wrestling event produced by Impact Wrestling. It took place on July 1, 2022, at Center Stage in Atlanta, Georgia, and aired on Impact Plus and YouTube. It was the 11th event under the Against All Odds chronology.

Eleven matches were contested at the event, including two on the pre-show and one taped as a digital exclusive. In the main event, Josh Alexander defeated Joe Doering to retain the Impact World Championship, ending Doering's undefeated streak. In other prominent matches, Jordynne Grace defeated Tasha Steelz to retain the Impact Knockouts World Championship, Moose defeated Sami Callihan in a Clockwork Orange House of Fun match, and Mike Bailey defeated Trey Miguel to retain the Impact X Division Championship.

== Production ==
Other on-screen personnel
Role:	Name:
Commentators	Tom Hannifan
Commentators	Matthew Rehwoldt
Commentators	Raven (Guest)
Ring announcers	David Penzer

=== Background ===
Against All Odds was an annual professional wrestling event produced by Impact Wrestling (then known as Total Nonstop Action Wrestling) between 2005 and 2012. In 2013, TNA discontinued most of its monthly pay-per-view events in favor of the new pre-recorded One Night Only events. It was revived as a special episode of Impact! that aired in 2019, and as a monthly special for Impact Plus in 2021. On May 26, 2022, Impact Wrestling announced that Against All Odds would take place on July 1, 2022, at Center Stage in Atlanta, Georgia.

=== Storylines ===
The event featured several professional wrestling matches that involved different wrestlers from pre-existing scripted feuds, plots, and storylines. Wrestlers portrayed heroes, villains, or less distinguishable characters in scripted events that build tension and culminate in a wrestling match or series of matches. Storylines were produced on Impact's weekly television program.

In the weeks leading up to the Impact World Championship match between Josh Alexander and Eric Young at Slammiversary, Alexander would have to deal with Young's Violent By Design (VBD) disciples Deaner and Joe Doering, the latter of whom had not been pinned or submitted since his arrival at Turning Point in November 2020. On the June 9 episode of Impact!, Alexander faced off with Doering in a non-title affair, which Doering won by disqualification. At Slammiversary, Alexander retained the title over Young, despite heavy involvement from VBD. After the match, Doering and Deaner would attack Alexander starting a brawl that would involve many members of the roster. Backstage, Impact Executive Vice President Scott D'Amore berated Deaner and Doering for their interference, to which they responded with indifference. They would remind D'Amore of Doering's undefeated streak, which now technically included a victory over Alexander. As a result, D'Amore decided to book Alexander and Doering for the Impact World Championship at Against All Odds. On the June 23 episode of Impact!, Doering and Deaner would attack Shark Boy, Bhupinder Gujjar, Johnny Swinger and Zicky Dice after a match. Deaner then would call out Alexander for a discussion, where Deaner would claim Doering is unbeatable and that Alexander is afraid of him. Alexander would rebuke him leading to a brawl until security separated them and a non-title match, where Alexander defeated Deaner.

At Slammiversary, Honor No More (Eddie Edwards, Matt Taven, Mike Bennett, PCO, and Vincent) were defeated by the Impact Originals (Alex Shelley, Chris Sabin, Davey Richards, Frankie Kazarian, and Nick Aldis). Later in the night, The Good Brothers (Doc Gallows and Karl Anderson) won their third Impact World Tag Team Championship from The Briscoes (Jay Briscoe and Mark Briscoe), before having an in-ring toast with Impact Original tag team America's Most Wanted (Chris Harris and James Storm). On the subsequent episode of Impact!, Honor No More would cut a promo, asking why Impact was still celebrating its 20th anniversary after Slammiversary while Edwards blamed PCO for their loss. They would be confronted by America's Most Wanted, who were soon joined by The Good Brothers and The Briscoes, the former of whom had prior history with Honor No More. After the ensuing brawl, Scott D'Amore would announce that Honor No More (Edwards, Taven, Bennett, Vincent, and Kenny King) would face Storm, The Briscoes, and The Good Brothers at Against All Odds. However, in that night's main event, Edwards, Taven, and Bennett defeated Storm and The Briscoes, where they would continue their assault and injure The Briscoes, removing them from the match at Against All Odds. The following week, AMW and the Good Brothers would attempt to recruit PCO. They would be rebuked by Vincent, who would assure PCO is loyal to HNM, which lead to a match with the Good Brothers. The Good Brothers (with Storm) would successfully defend the Impact World Tag Team Championship against Vincent and PCO (with Honor No More). After the match, Honor No More would beat them down until Harris and Heath made the save with nightsticks. Backstage Storm and The Good Brothers would find their new partners in Heath, who has had issues with Honor No More, injuring him and his partner Rhino, and Chris Harris, who despite some health reservations from Storm would be competing in his first professional match since February 2018.

After Moose broke his ankle several months ago, Sami Callihan made his in-ring return at Slammiversary, defeating Moose in a Monster's Ball match. On the June 23 episode of Impact!, Callihan, after defeating Jack Price, was attacked by Moose. A furious Calihan would run into Impact official Gail Kim, demanding a rematch with Moose to end their feud. When Kim asked what match could be a more violent end than Monster's Ball, Callihan countered with a Clockwork Orange House of Fun match, which was made official for Against All Odds. On June 28, it was announced that Raven, the creator of the match, will be in attendance to commentate on the match.

At Slammiversary, Jordynne Grace won the Impact Knockouts World Championship in the first-ever Queen of the Mountain match, defeating Chelsea Green, Deonna Purrazzo, Mia Yim, and defending champion Tasha Steelz. On the June 23 episode of Impact!, Steelz announced that she would invoke her rematch clause against Grace at Against All Odds. On the June 30 episode of Impact!, Grace would defeat Savannah Evans in a non-title match despite the presence of Steelz at ringside.

During the Queen of the Mountain match at Slammiversary, Chelsea Green and Deonna Purrazzo formed an alliance, trying to thin the field for either of them to win by any means necessary. Mickie James, who served as special guest enforcer, however, would always step in when the two began getting excessive with their methods. Later in the match, Mia Yim would push over a ladder, causing Green and Purrazzo to fly out of the ring and crashing through two tables. On the June 23 episode of Impact!, Yim defeated Green after James would come out to neutralize Purrazzo, who was in Green's corner. On June 27, it was announced that Yim and James will face Green and Purrazzo at Against All Odds. On the June 30 episode of Impact!, Green and Purrazzo would interrupt James during an backstage promo alluding that James and Yim couldn't be a good team. This would lead to a brawl until Yim joined the fight and helped to run off Green and Purrazzo.

On the June 16 episode of Impact!, Trey Miguel defeated Mike Bailey, giving the latter his first pinfall loss in Impact Wrestling. Three nights later, at Slammiversary, Bailey won the Impact X Division Championship in an Ultimate X match, defeating Alex Zayne, Andrew Everett, Kenny King, Miguel, and defending champion Ace Austin. On the June 30 episode of Impact!, Miguel defeated Laredo Kid, Chris Bey, and Steve Maclin in a four-way match to earn a title match against Bailey at Against All Odds.

At Slammiversary, Rosemary and Taya Valkyrie defeated The Influence (Madison Rayne and Tenille Dashwood) to win the Impact Knockouts World Tag Team Championship, with Rayne suffering a broken nose in the process. Unable to team up for their contractual rematch, The Influence were approached by Gisele Shaw, who after abandoning Alisha Edwards also desired tag team gold, on the subsequent episode of Impact!. To prove herself, Shaw defeated Rosemary the following week after The Influence took out Valkyrie to distract Rosemary. After that match, it was announced that The Influence, represented by Dashwood and Shaw, would challenge Rosemary and Valkyrie at Against All Odds. Later that night, Rosemary and Valkyrie would meet with Father James Mitchell seeking his help in locating Havok to be their backup against the Influence.

On the Countdown to Slammiversary pre-show, Rich Swann defeated Brian Myers to retain the Impact Digital Media Championship and prove he was the rightful champion. The week after on Before the Impact, Swann defeated Raj Singh (with Shera) in a non-title match while a condescending Myers commentated on the match on a live mic. During the match Swann would dive onto Myers and Shera. After the match Swann was attacked by Myers with the title belt, who challenged Swann to a rematch at Against All Odds. That match would officially be made a Dot Combat match on the Countdown to Against All Odds pre-show.

== Results ==
No.	Results	Stipulations	Times
1^{D}	Johnny Swinger and Zicky Dice defeated Raj Singh and Shera by pinfall (Note: The match was taped for an Impact Digital Exclusive that aired on July 5.)	Tag team match	5:17
2^{P}	Black Taurus (with Crazzy Steve) defeated Laredo Kid by pinfall	Singles match	7:45
3^{P}	Brian Myers defeated Rich Swann (c) by pinfall	Dot Combat match for the Impact Digital Media Championship	10:17
4	The Motor City Machine Guns (Alex Shelley and Chris Sabin) defeated Bullet Club (Ace Austin and Chris Bey) by pinfall	Tag team match	13:22
5	Chelsea Green and Deonna Purrazzo defeated Mia Yim and Mickie James by pinfall	Tag team match	9:05
6	Mike Bailey (c) defeated Trey Miguel by pinfall	Singles match for the Impact X Division Championship	14:02
7	Rosemary and Taya Valkyrie (c) defeated The Influence (Gisele Shaw and Tenille Dashwood) (with Madison Rayne) by pinfall	Tag team match for the Impact Knockouts World Tag Team Championship	9:00
8	Heath, America's Most Wanted (Chris Harris and James Storm), and The Good Brothers (Doc Gallows and Karl Anderson) defeated Honor No More (Eddie Edwards, Kenny King, Matt Taven, Mike Bennett, and PCO) (with Maria Kanellis-Bennett and Vincent) by pinfall	10-man tag team match	15:17
9	Moose defeated Sami Callihan by pinfall	Clockwork Orange House of Fun match	17:34
10	Jordynne Grace (c) defeated Tasha Steelz (with Savannah Evans) by pinfall	Singles match for the Impact Knockouts World Championship	11:56
11	Josh Alexander (c) defeated Joe Doering (with Deaner) by pinfall	Singles match for the Impact World Championship	15:59
(c) / – the champion(s) heading into the match; D / – this was a dark match; P / – the match was broadcast on the pre-show
