= TNA Against All Odds (2012) =

2012 Total Nonstop Action Wrestling pay-per-view event

Against All Odds (2012)
- Promotional poster featuring Jeff Hardy, James Storm, Bobby Roode, Velvet Sky, and Gail Kim
- Promotion: Total Nonstop Action Wrestling (TNA)
- Date: February 12, 2012
- City: Orlando, Florida
- Venue: Impact Zone
- Attendance: 1,100

Pay-per-view chronology
← Previous; Genesis	Next → Victory Road

Against All Odds chronology
← Previous; 2011	Next → 2019

The 2012 Against All Odds was a professional wrestling pay-per-view (PPV) event produced by the Total Nonstop Action Wrestling (TNA) promotion, that took place on February 12, 2012 at the Impact Wrestling Zone in Orlando, Florida. It is the eighth event under the Against All Odds chronology and the second event in the 2012 TNA PPV schedule. It was also the final Against All Odds event until the 2019 event.

In October 2017, with the launch of the Global Wrestling Network, the event became available to stream on demand. It would later be available on Impact Plus in May 2019.

== Storylines ==
Other on-screen personnel
Commentator	Mike Tenay
Commentator	Taz
Ring announcer	Christy Hemme
Ring announcer	Jeremy Borash
Referee	Brian Hebner
Referee	Brian Stifler
Referee	Earl Hebner
Interviewer	Jeremy Borash

Against All Odds featured eight professional wrestling matches that involved different wrestlers from pre-existing scripted feuds and storylines. Wrestlers portrayed villains, heroes, or less distinguishable characters in the scripted events that built tension and culminated in a wrestling match or series of matches.

The main angle featured at Against All Odds was between defending champion Bobby Roode, Jeff Hardy, Bully Ray and James Storm in a Four Way match, feuding over for the TNA World Heavyweight Championship with TNA general manager Sting serving as the Special Ringside Enforcer. On the January 12 edition of Impact Wrestling, Sting scheduled the two matches from the Genesis PPV to take place – the first was Roode-Hardy for Hardy getting screwed by the result of his Genesis title match and Storm-Angle to determine a number one contender to the title. Due to Roode getting intentionally disqualified to retain his title at Genesis, Sting ruled to have decisive winners out of both matches and made sure to stipulate that if Roode acted similar to his behavior at the PPV, his title would be forfeited to Hardy. Later that night, Storm defeated Angle to advance as the winner in their match, and Roode wrestled with Hardy to a no-contest due to outside interference by Bully Ray, who incapacitated the referee. The next week when Storm and Hardy disputed over Roode's actions, and Roode trying desperately to rid himself of contenders, exposed a loophole in the matches the week before which did not meet Sting's orders, and as a result, had nullified the contender's spot, Sting booked a match between Storm and Hardy for contention to the title. With that match concluding in a no-contest identical to a week ago, Storm, Hardy and Sting reached a boiling point by physically combating the two villains over the next set of weeks. Going into the PPV, Ray and Roode experienced some dissension as a unit over Roode looking out for himself, and Sting announced himself as the Special Ringside Enforcer for the Four Way match featuring all four men at Against All Odds.

Going into Against All Odds rekindled the feud between Garett Bischoff, represented by Hulk Hogan, and Gunner, represented by Eric Bischoff. At Bound for Glory, Eric turned on his son Garett for officiating the submission that allowed Sting to beat his villainous Immortal comrade Hulk Hogan, who would then become the hero by rescuing Garett and Sting from an attack by the group. On the January 5 edition of Impact Wrestling, Garett Bischoff returned to the company and was stripped of his referee duties and welcomed to the official roster as a full-time wrestler by TNA GM Sting, after his storyline injury from receiving a piledriver on the exposed concrete floor at the hands of Gunner in December. Eric responded by trying to deter Garett from becoming a wrestler, stating he burned his bridges and has no friends in the business. Garett told Eric that he had friends and wasn't going anywhere regardless, informing his father that he would eventually find out who his big mystery trainer was. On the February 2 edition of Impact, Eric and Gunner attempted to convince Garett to give up thinking he didn't have a trainer, but Garett revealed his mystery trainer to be Hulk Hogan.

Another main feud ignited between A.J Styles and Kazarian which led to a singles match. Styles and Kazarian were the final two remaining Fortune members since most of the group had begun to dissolve with Daniels betraying Styles and Roode turning on Storm. On the December 15 edition of Impact Wrestling, both took part in the Wild Card Tournament implemented to determine number one contenders to the TNA World Tag Team Championship. For the rest of the month, they succeeded in advancing all the way to the finals, where on the January 5 edition of Impact, Styles and Kazarian were defeated due to an intervention by Daniels, who had spoken secretly with Kazarian before the match and peer pressured him into deserting Styles, effectively distracting Styles into losing the match. The next week, Styles sought after his former partner's motivations for allowing Daniels to talk him into the betrayal. Controlled and manipulated by Daniels against his will, which alienated Styles into chucking a microphone at Daniels preceding an attack, Kazarian remained unspoken but acted out Daniels' orders, costing Styles a match against Gunner that night. On the January 26 edition of Impact, when Styles tried to propose a truce with Kazarian, Daniels told Kazarian that he knew exactly why he couldn't accept it and instructed him to tell TNA GM Sting to book Styles against Kazarian at Against All Odds to end the issue once and for all.

An X Division match that was scheduled for Against All Odds was Alex Shelley facing defending champion Austin Aries for the TNA X Division Championship. On the January 19 edition of Impact, Alex Shelley returned following a five-month absence from a shoulder injury to challenge Austin Aries, who had been dominating the X Division for months. Aries, not sweating Shelley as a challenger, agreed to only give Shelley his desired title match if he could defeat an opponent of his choosing. The next week, Shelley beat Zema Ion to become the number one contender for the title.

A Tag Team match set for Against All Odds was Samoa Joe and Magnus versus the defending champions Crimson and Matt Morgan in a TNA World Tag Team Championship rematch. At Genesis, Joe and Magnus lost to the champions Morgan and Crimson with their shots at the tag titles. On the January 12 edition of Impact, Joe and Magnus attacked Morgan and Crimson after they successfully retained the Tag Titles, leading up to the eventual announcement of their rematch.

A Knockouts match entering Against All Odds was Tara going up against the defending champion Gail Kim for the TNA Women's Knockout Championship. On the January 26 edition of Impact, Tara defeated Velvet Sky and Mickie James to become number one contender to the Knockouts Title. Tara picked up momentum the next week gaining a victory over Kim in a non-title match.

Robbie E presented an Open Challenge at Against All Odds for his TNA Television Championship, which later was answered by Shannon Moore.

Two other top contenders in the X Division, Zema Ion and Jesse Sorensen did battle over determining the number one contender to the TNA X Division Championship for whoever won between Aries and Shelley.

== Results ==
No.	Results	Stipulations	Times
1	Zema Ion defeated Jesse Sorensen by countout	Singles match to determine the #1 contender for the TNA X Division Championship	04:35
2	Robbie E (c) (with Robbie T) defeated Shannon Moore	Singles match for the TNA Television Championship	09:31
3	Gail Kim (c) defeated Tara	Singles match for the TNA Women's Knockout Championship	06:46
4	Samoa Joe and Magnus defeated Crimson and Matt Morgan (c)	Tag team match for the TNA World Tag Team Championship	09:59
5	Austin Aries (c) defeated Alex Shelley by submission	Singles match for the TNA X Division Championship	14:25
6	Kazarian (with Christopher Daniels) defeated A.J. Styles	Singles match	18:17
7	Gunner (with Eric Bischoff) defeated Garett Bischoff (with Hulk Hogan)	Singles match	12:50
8	Bobby Roode (c) defeated Bully Ray, James Storm and Jeff Hardy	Four-Way match for the TNA World Heavyweight Championship with Sting as Special Guest Enforcer	15:12
(c) / – the champion(s) heading into the match

== Jesse Sorensen injury ==
During the first match of the pay-per-view, Zema Ion attempted a Moonsault on Jesse Sorensen to the outside of the ring. Ion's knee hit directly into Sorensen’s upper cranium, instantly causing him to collapse to the ground, fracturing his C1 Vertebra. Sorensen was then counted out by the referee and loaded via stretcher, being carried out of the ring, effectively ending his run with the company. Sorensen returned to the ring a year and a half later on July 27, 2013 in a winning effort with Nick Fame against Angel Santos and MDK at FUW Throwndown 5.

== See also ==
- 2012 in professional wrestling
