= TNA Against All Odds =

Professional wrestling event series

Against All Odds
- Promotions: Total Nonstop Action Wrestling
- First event: Against All Odds (2005)
- Last event: TNA Against All Odds (2025)

Against All Odds was an annual professional wrestling TNA+ event held by Total Nonstop Action Wrestling. It was established in 2005 as TNA's fourth pay-per-view event as part of the inaugural series of monthly pay-per-views put on by the promotion, and held in February.

The PPV was canceled in December 2012, but the event was revived as a One Night Only PPV in 2016, a television special in 2019, and an Impact Plus Monthly Special from 2021 onward.

== History ==
The inaugural Against All Odds event took place on February 13, 2005, at the TNA Impact! Zone in Orlando, Florida. Against All Odds remained one of TNA's annual pay-per-views up until the last event at the time, which took place on February 12, 2012, at the Impact Zone. On August 16–17, 2016, TNA filmed One Night Only: Against All Odds, which aired on tape delay under the One Night Only event series, On November 4 of that year.

On 2017, after Anthem Sports & Entertainment purchased a majority stake of TNA, Anthem re-branded TNA as Impact Wrestling. Impact brought back the Against All Odds event on February 17, 2019, at the Sam's Town Casino in Sunrise Manor, Nevada. Since of April 2020, due to the COVID-19 pandemic in the United States, Impact had to present the majority of its programming from a behind closed doors set at Skyway Studios in Nashville, Tennessee. The 12th Against All Odds event was in front of a live crowd, which took place on July 1, 2022, at the Center Stage in Atlanta, Georgia.

== Events ==
| # | Event | Date | City | Venue | Main event | Ref. |
|---|---|---|---|---|---|---|
| 1 | Against All Odds (2005) | February 13, 2005 | Orlando, Florida | TNA Impact! Zone | Jeff Jarrett (c) vs. Kevin Nash for the NWA World Heavyweight Championship | |
| 2 | Against All Odds (2006) | February 12, 2006 | Orlando, Florida | TNA Impact! Zone | Jeff Jarrett (c) vs. Christian Cage for the NWA World Heavyweight Championship | |
| 3 | Against All Odds (2007) | February 11, 2007 | Orlando, Florida | TNA Impact! Zone | Christian Cage (c) vs. Kurt Angle for the NWA World Heavyweight Championship, with Samoa Joe as the unofficial special guest ringside enforcer | |
| 4 | Against All Odds (2008) | February 10, 2008 | Greenville, South Carolina | BI-LO Center | Kurt Angle (c) vs. Christian Cage for the TNA World Heavyweight Championship, with Samoa Joe as the special guest ringside enforcer | |
| 5 | Against All Odds (2009) | February 8, 2009 | Orlando, Florida | TNA Impact! Zone | Sting (c) vs. Brother Devon vs. Brother Ray vs. Kurt Angle in a four-way match for the TNA World Heavyweight Championship | |
| 6 | Against All Odds (2010) | February 14, 2010 | Orlando, Florida | TNA Impact! Zone | D'Angelo Dinero vs. Mr. Anderson in the finals of the 8 Card Stud Tournament | |
| 7 | Against All Odds (2011) | February 13, 2011 | Orlando, Florida | Impact Zone | Mr. Anderson (c) vs. Jeff Hardy in a ladder match for the TNA World Heavyweight Championship | |
| 8 | Against All Odds (2012) | February 12, 2012 | Orlando, Florida | Impact Zone | Bobby Roode (c) vs. Bully Ray vs. James Storm vs. Jeff Hardy in a four-way match for the TNA World Heavyweight Championship, with Sting as the special guest ringside enforcer | |
| 9 | One Night Only: Against All Odds | November 4, 2016 (Note: The event was taped on August 16–17, 2016.) | Orlando, Florida | Impact Zone | Ethan Carter III vs. Matt Hardy | |
| 10 | Against All Odds (2019) | February 17, 2019 | Sunrise Manor, Nevada | Sam's Town Casino | Brian Cage vs. Killer Kross | |
| 11 | Against All Odds (2021) | June 12, 2021 | Nashville, Tennessee; Jacksonville, Florida (Note: The main event took place on All Elite Wrestling (AEW)'s home base of the Daily's Place in Jacksonville, Florida.) | Skyway Studios; Daily's Place | Kenny Omega (c) vs. Moose for the Impact World Championship | |
| 12 | Against All Odds (2022) | July 1, 2022 | Atlanta, Georgia | Center Stage | Josh Alexander (c) vs. Joe Doering for the Impact World Championship | |
| 13 | Against All Odds (2023) | June 9, 2023 | Columbus, Ohio | Ohio Expo Center and State Fairgrounds | Steve Maclin (c) vs. Alex Shelley for the Impact World Championship | |
| 14 | Against All Odds (2024) | June 14, 2024 | Cicero, Illinois | Cicero Stadium | Moose (c) vs. "Broken" Matt Hardy for the TNA World Championship | |
| 15 | Against All Odds (2025) | June 6, 2025 | Tempe, Arizona | Mullett Arena | Trick Williams (c) vs Elijah for TNA World Championship | |
(c) – refers to the champion(s) heading into the match
