= Impact Wrestling Uncaged =

Uncaged
- Promotion: Impact Wrestling
- Date: January 11, 2019; January 12, 2019 (aired February 15, 2019)
- City: Mexico City, Mexico
- Venue: Frontón México
- Attendance: 1400

Impact! special episodes chronology
← Previous; ReDefined	Next → Against All Odds

Uncaged was a professional wrestling television special produced by Impact Wrestling, which was taped on January 11 and January 12, 2019 at the Frontón México in Mexico City, Mexico and it aired on February 15, 2019 as an episode of Impact!.

Four professional wrestling matches were contested at the event. The main event was a four-way match for the Impact World Championship, in which Johnny Impact retained the title against Brian Cage, Killer Kross and Moose. On the undercard, Taya Valkyrie retained the Impact Knockouts Championship against Tessa Blanchard in a street fight and Lucha Libre AAA Worldwide representatives Aero Star, El Hijo del Vikingo, Psycho Clown and Puma King defeated Impact Wrestling representatives Eddie Edwards, Eli Drake, Fallah Bahh and Sami Callihan in an eight-man elimination tag team match to win the World Cup.

== Storylines ==
At Homecoming, Johnny Impact retained the Impact World Championship against Brian Cage but Cage tossed the title to Impact and considered it unfair officiating on part of the referee Johnny Bravo. Killer Kross then attacked Impact and his wife Taya Valkyrie after the match. Cage confronted Impact on the January 11 episode of Impact! and demanded another title shot, but Impact preferred to avenge Kross' attack on Valkyrie. It resulted in a physical altercation in which Cage knocked out Impact. Later in the night, Impact lost a non-title no disqualification match to Kross after Moose interfered in the match on Kross' behalf. The following week, on Impact!, Cage attacked random people backstage and KM and Caleb Konley due to his frustration over Impact and Bravo. Impact came to confront Cage but Kross and Moose attacked both men. Cage would then defeat Moose later in the night. On the January 25 episode of Impact!, Impact defended the World Championship against Kross but Cage interfered in the match and attacked both men. Impact and Cage then cleared Kross and Moose from the ring in a post-match brawl. On the February 1 episode of Impact!, it was announced that Impact would defend the title against Cage in a rematch at Uncaged. Later that night, Impact and Cage lost a match to Kross and Moose after an argument ensued between Impact and Cage. On the February 8 episode of Impact!, Kross and Moose were added into the World Championship match between Impact and Cage at Uncaged, making it a four-way match.

At Homecoming, Taya Valkyrie defeated Tessa Blanchard to win the Impact Knockouts Championship after Blanchard got into a confrontation with the guest referee Gail Kim. Blanchard ranted against Impact management due to what she claimed to be unfair officiating by Kim. On the January 18 episode of Impact!, Blanchard attacked Kim, resulting in Scott D'Amore suspending her. On the February 1 episode of Impact!, Blanchard challenged Valkyrie to a rematch for the title via her Twitter account during the suspension. Later that night, Valkyrie accepted Blanchard's challenge and announced that their title match at Uncaged would be a street fight.

An eight-man elimination tag team match was announced between Team Impact (Eddie Edwards, Eli Drake, Fallah Bahh and Sami Callihan) and Team AAA (Aero Star, El Hijo del Vikingo, Psycho Clown and Puma King) for the World Cup at Uncaged.

It was announced that Willie Mack would take on Ethan Page at Uncaged.

== Event ==
=== Preliminary matches ===
The event kicked off with a street fight, in which Taya Valkyrie defended the Knockouts Championship against Tessa Blanchard. Valkyrie knocked out Blanchard with a diving double foot stomp through a table to retain the title.

Next, Willie Mack took on Ethan Page. Mack nailed Page with a stunner for the win.

Sami Callihan then offered Rich Swann, a spot in his group oVe but Swann refused which led to Callihan and Swann brawling with each other and the brawl ended with Callihan delivering a piledriver to Swann through the stage to knock him out. Callihan would then participate in an eight-man elimination tag team match to represent Impact Wrestling alongside Eddie Edwards, Eli Drake and Fallah Bahh against Lucha Libre AAA Worldwide representatives Aero Star, El Hijo del Vikingo, Psycho Clown and Puma King for the World Cup. The first elimination occurred when Edwards prevented Drake from using Edwards' "Kenny" on King, allowing King to roll up Drake. Vikingo dived onto Bahh but Bahh countered by powerslamming him to eliminate him. Bahh then tried to nail a Banzai Drop to Aero Star but Aero Star avoided it and pinned Bahh with a crucifix to eliminate him. Edwards then nailed a Boston Knee Party to Aero Star to eliminate him. The match progressed as Callihan executed a Cactus Special to King to eliminate him. Edwards then nailed a Boston Knee Party to Clown but Callihan pushed him, allowing Clown to roll him up for the elimination. Edwards and Psycho Clown were the remaining two participants. Eli Drake interfered by hitting Edwards with a kendo stick and Clown hit a double knee backbreaker to Edwards and pinned him with a La magistral for the win.

=== Main event match ===
The main event was a four-way match for the Impact World Championship, in which Johnny Impact defended the title against Brian Cage, Killer Kross and Moose. Impact first nailed Moose with a Countdown to Impact and Cage then delivered a Drill Claw to Kross and both men simultaneously got the pinfalls but Impact was awarded the victory due to executing his finisher first.

== Aftermath ==
On the February 22 episode of Impact!, Killer Kross and Moose competed in a match to determine the #1 contender for the Impact World Championship, which ended in a no contest after Johnny Impact attacked both men. Kross and Moose double teamed Impact after the match until Brian Cage made the save and respectfully handed the title belt to Impact and Impact promised Cage a future title shot. Cage and Impact would then compete against Kross and Moose on the following week's Impact!, which the former team lost after Impact suffered an injury and Cage was knocked out due to blood loss. A title match was set between Impact and Cage on the March 15 episode of Impact!, but Kross brought Impact on his shoulder before the match occurred. Kross then attempted to attack Impact until Taya Valkyrie pleaded him not to attack Impact. This led to Cage coming to Impact's rescue and clearing Kross from the ring. Valkyrie then hugged Cage only to hit him with a low blow and Impact got up to reveal that it was a ruse. Impact later explained the motive behind his betrayal of Cage was that fans turned on Impact and cheered for Cage at Homecoming, and he no longer cared for the fans but focused on taking care of his wife and retaining his title. He then announced that he would defend the title against Cage in a rematch at Rebellion. On the March 22 episode of Impact!, Cage was also scheduled to compete against Kross at Against All Odds.

Eli Drake's attack on Eddie Edwards that caused Team Impact to lose to Team AAA at Uncaged led to a match between Edwards and Drake on the February 22 episode of Impact!, which Edwards won. Drake approached Edwards to form a tag team by appreciating the fact that Edwards won cleanly without using a kendo stick but Edwards refused to team with Drake and said that Kenny was his tag team partner. However, on the March 8 episode of Impact!, Drake rescued Edwards from an attack by Desi Hit Squad (Raj Singh and Rohit Raju), who harassed Edwards' wife Alisha Edwards. This led to Edwards teaming with Drake to defeat Desi Hit Squad on the March 15 episode of Impact!. Edwards and Drake won tag team matches over the next few weeks, to earn an Impact World Tag Team Championship match against Lucha Brothers (Pentagón Jr. and Fenix) on the April 19 episode of Impact!, which they lost. Drake attacked Edwards after the match and stole his kendo stick. The following week, on Impact!, Drake revealed that Edwards had become a weak link of their team due to ceasing usage of the kendo stick and said that Kenny was his friend, until Edwards attacked him and chased him out of the arena. It was Drake's final appearance in Impact as he was fired by the company.

Tessa Blanchard continued to protest against Impact management over her loss to Taya Valkyrie and specifically targeted Gail Kim. After weeks of tension, Kim confronted Blanchard at Against All Odds, and announced that she would come out of retirement to challenge Blanchard to a match at Rebellion, which Blanchard accepted.

Willie Mack and Ethan Page competed in a rematch on the March 22 episode of Impact!, which Mack won.

Sami Callihan continued to persuade Rich Swann to join oVe. On the March 8 episode of Impact!, oVe interrupted Swann after the latter defeated Ethan Page. Callihan then handed over oVe merchandise to Swann and tried to convince him to wear it. Swann wore it and hugged oVe to show that he joined the group but he revealed it to be a ruse as he attacked all three members of oVe and tore off the merchandise. Callihan would then challenge Swann for the X Division Championship on the March 22 episode of Impact!. Swann retained the title but Callihan tried to attack him after the match which distracted Swann enough for the debuting Madman Fulton to attack him and join oVe as its newest member. On the April 5 episode of Impact!, Callihan and Fulton defeated Swann and Willie Mack. Later that night, it was announced that Swann would defend the title against Callihan at Rebellion. It was later revealed that the title match would be an oVe rules match.

== Results ==
No.	Results	Stipulations	Times
1	Taya Valkyrie (c) defeated Tessa Blanchard	Street Fight for the Impact Knockouts Championship	17:56
2	Willie Mack defeated Ethan Page	Singles match	5:03
3	Team AAA (Aero Star, El Hijo del Vikingo, Psycho Clown and Puma King) defeated Team Impact (Eddie Edwards, Eli Drake, Fallah Bahh and Sami Callihan)	Eight-man elimination tag team match	23:12
4	Johnny Impact (c) defeated Brian Cage, Killer Kross and Moose	Four-way match for the Impact World Championship	10:37
(c) / – the champion(s) heading into the match
