= TNA Rebellion (2024) =

2024 Total Nonstop Action Wrestling event

Rebellion
- Promotional poster featuring Nic Nemeth
- Promotion: Total Nonstop Action Wrestling
- Date: April 20, 2024
- City: Paradise, Nevada
- Venue: Palms Casino Resort
- Attendance: 1,150

Pay-per-view chronology
← Previous; Hard To Kill	Next → Slammiversary

Rebellion chronology
← Previous; 2023	Next → 2025

The 2024 Rebellion was a professional wrestling pay-per-view (PPV) event produced by Total Nonstop Action Wrestling (TNA). It took place on April 20, 2024, at the Palms Casino Resort in Paradise, Nevada. It was the sixth event under the Rebellion chronology.

Eleven matches were contested at the event, including three on the Countdown to Rebellion pre-show. In the main event, Moose defeated Nic Nemeth to retain the TNA World Championship. In other prominent matches, Jordynne Grace defeated Steph De Lander to retain the TNA Knockouts World Championship, Josh Alexander defeated Hammerstone in a Last Man Standing match, Frankie Kazarian defeated Eric Young in a Full Metal Mayhem match, and Mustafa Ali defeated Jake Something in the opening contest to retain the TNA X Division Championship. The event also featured the TNA returns of Mike Santana, Sami Callihan, and Matt Hardy.

== Production ==
=== Background ===
Rebellion is a professional wrestling event produced by Total Nonstop Action Wrestling. It is annually held during the month of April, and the event was first held in 2019. On February 8, 2024, TNA announced Rebellion would take place in on April 20, 2024, at the Palms Casino Resort in Paradise, Nevada.

=== Storylines ===
The event featured several professional wrestling matches, which involve different wrestlers from pre-existing scripted feuds, plots, and storylines. Wrestlers portrayed heroes, villains, or less distinguishable characters in scripted events that build tension and culminate in a wrestling match or series of matches. Storylines were produced on the company's weekly programs, Impact! and Xplosion.

At Hard To Kill, Moose defeated Alex Shelley to win the TNA World Championship. However, as he and his stablemates in The System (Brian Myers, Eddie Edwards, Alisha Edwards, and DeAngelo Williams) were set to celebrate, they were interrupted by the debuting Nic Nemeth (formerly Dolph Ziggler in WWE), who immediately attacked Moose. On the subsequent episode of TNA Impact!, Nemeth made his intentions clear about becoming the next TNA World Champion. Two months later on the March 14 episode, after Nemeth and Speedball Mountain (Mike Bailey and Trent Seven) defeated Steve Maclin and The Rascalz (Trey Miguel and Zachary Wentz), The System attacked and laid out the former three. Immediately following this, TNA announced that Nemeth would challenge Moose for the TNA World Championship at Rebellion, with Speedball Mountain also challenging Myers and Edwards for the TNA World Tag Team Championship.

On the March 21 episode of TNA Impact!, Jake Something won a "Rebellion Referendum" six-way match to earn a TNA X Division Championship opportunity against Mustafa Ali at Rebellion.

Eric Young and Frankie Kazarian had been embroiled in a rivalry ever since the January 18 TNA Impact!, when the latter attacked the former after losing a tag team match. Kazarian vowed to make 2024 "his year", win the TNA World Championship and be forever remembered as a "king" of TNA, much like he perceives Young to be. The two would eventually have a singles match at No Surrender, with the winner earning a TNA World Title match at Sacrifice. Young would end up winning the match, with Kazarian later attacking the referee in anger. TNA Director of Authority Santino Marella would suspend Kazarian for his actions. Kazarian, however, continued to target Young, costing him his world title match against Moose at Sacrifice. Two weeks later on the March 21 TNA Impact!, Young conducted a promo on the entrance ramp, calling out Kazarian for a Full Metal Mayhem match at Rebellion. TNA would make the match official later via their website.

On the March 28 TNA Impact!, Steph De Lander returned to TNA and, with help from an also returning Matt Cardona, won an 8-4-1 match to become number one contender to Jordynne Grace's TNA Knockouts World Championship at Rebellion.

At Hard To Kill, Hammerstone made his TNA in-ring debut in a losing effort to Josh Alexander. Two months later at Sacrifice, the two had a rematch where Hammerstone – now a full-time member of the TNA roster – got the victory, although he had given Alexander a low blow away from the referee's view to do so; after which, he stole Alexander's wrestling headgear as a sort of trophy. On the April 4 episode of TNA Impact!, TNA announced a rubber match between Hammerstone and Alexander for Rebellion. The following week, Alexander and Hammerstone got into a pull-apart brawl at the start of the show, to which the former upped the ante by challenging the latter to a Last Man Standing match at Rebellion, which TNA made official.

After A. J. Francis made his TNA debut at Hard To Kill, he had been the subject of ridicule by Joe Hendry, who constantly made music videos mocking Francis' appearance, wrestling ability, and musical talents. When Francis retaliated against Hendry, the latter was backed up by Rich Swann; although, at No Surrender, Francis argued to Swann that they didn't have to be on opposite sides. On the March 14 episode of TNA Impact!, Francis and Hendry faced off in Francis' TNA singles debut, which he won after Swann turned on Hendry. Francis and Swann would dub their new alliance "Fir$t Cla$$" the following week. Some weeks later on the April 11 episode, Hendry confronted Fir$t Cla$$ after a tag team match, mocking Swann for turning on him and aligning with Francis. He would then challenge Swann to face him at Rebellion, which was made official by TNA.

On April 18, TNA announced that rock guitarist DJ Ashba would perform "The Star-Spangled Banner" at the event.

On the Countdown to Sacrifice pre-show, Laredo Kid was scheduled to challenge Crazzy Steve for the TNA Digital Media Championship, but travel issues forced him off the show. The two would eventually have their title match on the April 11 TNA Impact!. There, Steve played into Kid's frustrations and anxiety, and after grabbing at Kid's mask, the latter shoved the referee in anger, causing a disqualification. The following week, it was announced that Kid will get a rematch for Steve's Digital Media Championship on the Countdown to Rebellion pre-show.

At the end of the April 19 TNA Impact!, a vignette played that displayed the phrase "Lights Out", teasing Matt Hardy's return for Rebellion.

== Event ==
Other on-screen personnel
Role:	Name:
Commentators	Tom Hannifan
Commentators	Matthew Rehwoldt
Ring announcer	Jennifer Chung
Referees	Daniel Spencer
Referees	Allison Leigh
Referees	Frank Gastineau
Interviewer	Gia Miller

=== Countdown to Rebellion pre-show ===
There were three matches on the Countdown to Rebellion pre-show. In the opener, ABC (Chris Bey and Ace Austin) and Leon Slater took on the trio of The Rascalz (Trey Miguel, Zachary Wentz and Myron Reed). In the closing stages, Reed delivered a guillotine leg drop to Austin. ABC then performed Chasing the Dragon on Reed for a two-count. Reed then delivered a plancha over the ring post onto ABC on the outside. As The Rascalz were regrouping, Slater delivered a plancha over the ring post onto The Rascalz. Reed then delivered an assisted cutter to ABC on the outside. Back in the ring, Miguel performed a diving meteora onto Slater, followed by a swanton bomb from Wentz and a springboard 450°splash, but Austin broke up the pinfall. ABC delivered the Art of Finesse/The Fold combination to Miguel, allowing Slater to deliver a swanton 450° splash to Reed to win the match.

Next, Crazzy Steve defended the TNA Digital Media Championship against Laredo Kid. In the closing stages, Laredo Kid delivered an Asai moonsault to Steve for a two-count. Steve then performed superplex to Laredo Kid. Steve attempted to go to the top rope, but Laredo Kid stopped him and delivered an avalanche Spanish Fly and pinned him to win the title.

In the pre-show main event, Spitfire (Dani Luna and Jody Threat) (accompanied by Lars Frederiksen) defended the TNA Knockouts World Tag Team Championship against Decay (Havok and Rosemary). In the closing stages, Luna and Threat delivered simultaneous suicide dives to Havok on the guardrail. Threat then delivered a swanton bomb to Havok on the outside. Luna and Threat then double powerbombed Havok and delivered an assisted Burning Hammer/sit-out powerbomb combination on Rosemary and pinned her to win the match. After the match, Masha Slamovich and Alisha Edwards stared down Spitfire with a chain and kendo stick in hand respectively.

=== Preliminary matches ===
In the opening match of the event, Mustafa Ali defended the TNA X Division Championship against Jake Something. Ali delivered a DDT to Something on the floor, and then a rolling neckbreaker in the ring. Ali then tossed Something onto the ramp and delivered a neckbreaker. Something put Ali into a fireman's carry position, but Ali escaped and delivered a DDT for a two-count. Ali attempted a standing moonsault, but Something caught him and powerbombed him and then delivered a backbreaker for a two-count. Ali then delivered another neckbreaker and a 450° splash to Something for a two-count. Something then dove onto Ali's security guards on the outside. Back in the ring, Something performed a cutter to Ali and then delivered The Void, but Ali put his foot on the bottom rope, stopping the referee's count. Jake then attempted a powerbomb to Ali, but Ali raked his eyes and pushed him into the ring post; Ali then used a roll-up pin on Something to win the match and retain his title.

Next, Rich Swann (accompanied by AJ Francis) faced Joe Hendry. In the closing stages, Hendry clotheslined Swann multiple times and then attacked Francis. Swann then kicked Hendry's gut and pinned him for a two-count. Francis then carried a chain, but former NFL football linebacker Shawne Merriman, who was in the crowd, grabbed it, which led to an argument between Francis and Merriman. Merriman then jumped over the barricade and entered the ring. Francis then distracted the referee, allowing Merriman to clothesline Hendry. Swann then delivered a 450° splash to Hendry and pinned him to win the match.

In the next match, Eric Young faced Frankie Kazarian in a Full Metal Mayhem match. In the opening stages, Young attacked Kazarian with a ladder. Kazarian then delivered a DDT to Young for a two-count. Young then hit Kazarian with a platter and the lid of a trashcan. Kazarian then attempted to deliver a legdrop to Young onto a ladder, but Young moved out of the way and Kazarian landed on the ladder. Kazarian then speared Young off the apron through a table for a two-count. Young then repeatedly hit Kazarian with a baking sheet for a two-count. Young then put a trash can onto Kazarian's head and hit him with a steel chain. Young, with the chain still in hand, delivered a diving elbow drop to Kazarian for a two-count. Kazarian then delivered a low blow to Young and then dropped him with a flux capacitor through a table and pinned him to win the match.

Next, Steve Maclin came out and demanded a match for Rebellion. Director of Authority Santino Marella then came out and said that Maclin was a lucky son of a gun and that he just recently signed a new wrestler to TNA and that was who Maclin was going to face. Mike Santana came out through the crowd and it was revealed that he was Maclin's opponent, marking Santana's first appearance for TNA since August 2019. The bell rang and both men started brawling. Maclin delivered a backbreaker for a two-count. Santana then delivered a clothesline to Maclin for a two-count. Santana then delivered a rolling 450° splash and an elbow drop for a two-count. Santana attempted Spin The Block, but Maclin impeded it with a jumping knee strike. Maclin then hit Santana with a clubby blow for a two-count. Santana then delivered Spin The Block to Maclin and pinned him to win the match.

Next, Brian Myers and Eddie Edwards (accompanied by Alisha Edwards) defended the TNA World Tag Team Championship against Speedball Mountain (Trent Seven and Mike Bailey). In the opening stages, Seven delivered a DDT to Eddie for a two-count. Bailey then delivered a running shooting star press to Myers for a two-count. Seven delivered a superplex to Myers, followed by a shooting star press for a two-count. Eddie then delivered a Tiger Driver to Seven and locked in a Boston Crab, but Bailey broke up the pin; Bailey then delivered a moonsault to Myers on the outside. Myers then delivered a diving elbow drop to Seven for a two-count. Bailey leapt off the apron, but Myers caught him with a spear. Myers and Eddie then delivered The Roster Cut/Boston Knee Party combination to Seven to retain the titles.

The next match was a Last Man Standing match between Josh Alexander and Hammerstone. In the opening stages, Alexander attempted a C4 Spike, but Hammerstone back body dropped him. Hammerstone then delivered a belly-to-belly suplex to Alexander. Alexander then delivered a half-and-half suplex to Hammerstone on the floor, but Hammerstone got up. Hammerstone then wrapped Alexander's legs around the ring post and locked in a figure four leglock, but Alexander got up by the nine-count. Hammerstone then delivered a fallaway slam and locked in a Torture Rack on Alexander and dropped him, but Alexander got up at the eight count. Hammerstone then delivered a pump kick to Alexander. Hammerstone then dropped Alexander onto a bed of thumbtacks, but Alexander got up. Alexander then delivered a C4 Spike to Hammerstone on the entrance ramp; Hammerstone couldn't get up by the ten-count, thus Alexander won the match.

In the penultimate match, Jordynne Grace defended the TNA Knockouts World Championship against Steph De Lander (accompanied by The Good Hands (John Skyler and Jason Hotch)). In the opening stages, De Lander delivered a big boot to Grace for a two-count. Grace then delivered an elbow smash to De Lander. De Lander then chopped Grace and kicked her in the mid-section. Grace then locked in a sleeper hold, but De Lander escaped. De Lander suplexed Grace for a two-count. Grace then locked in the sleeper hold again on De Lander, but The Good Hands distracted the referee, allowing De Lander to escape and retrieve the TNA Knockouts title. De Lander inadvertently hit the referee with the title belt, and then hit Grace with the aforementioned belt. Hotch of The Good Hands put on a referee shirt and attempted to count the pin, but the lights went out; the lights came back on and PCO stopped Hotch from making the count but holding Hotch's hand. PCO then clotheslined Hotch and was seduced by De Lander. PCO feigned and attempted to chokeslam her, until Kon attacked him from behind. Kon them back suplexed PCO onto the ring apron. Kon then shoved Grace, but Grace responded with a low blow. Grace attempted to carry Kon, but The Good Hands stopped her and Hotch, Skyler and Kon attacked Grace. Kon attempted to twist Grace's neck, but the lights went out again and when they came back on, the returning Sami Callihan was standing in the corner with his trademark hat and baseball bat. Callihan then attacked Hotch, Skyler and Kon with the bat. Callihan then delivered the Cactus Driver '97 to Hotch and tossed De Lander back on the ring. Grace then delivered the Juggernaut Driver to De Lander and another referee came down and counted the three-count, with Grace retaining her title.

=== Main event ===
In the main event, Moose (accompanied by The System (Eddie Edwards, Brian Myers and Alisha Edwards)) defended the TNA World Championship against Nic Nemeth. In the opening stages, Moose delivered a pump kick to Nemeth. Nemeth then delivered a missile dropkick to Moose. As Nemeth attempted a superkick from the corner, Alisha the grabbed Nemeth's leg, allowing Moose to clothesline him. The referee then ejected The System from ringside. Nemeth then delivered a superkick to Moose for a two-count. Nemeth then locked in a sleeper hold on Moose, but Moose escaped. Nemeth then delivered a Fameasser to Moose on the entrance ramp and then a neckbreaker in the ring. Moose delivered a Sky High spinebuster to Nemeth for a two-count. Moose attempted a spear, but Nemeth impeded it with a roll-up pin for a two-count. Moose them powerbombed Nemeth for a two-count. Nemeth hit another Fameasser on Moose for another two-count. Moose attempted another spear, but Nemeth impeded it with a superkick and then delivered a spear for a two-count. Nemeth attempted another superkick, but Moose moved out of the way and landed a spear to win the match. After the match, The System came out to applaud Moose. The Lights Out vignette then aired on the screen and the lights went out; a laugh echoed around the arena and when the lights went back on, "Broken" Matt Hardy was standing behind Moose, marking Hardy's first appearance in TNA since 2017. As Moose turned around, Hardy delivered the Twist of Fate to Moose. Hardy then chanted "Delete, Delete, Delete" and raised the TNA World Championship as the show went off the air.

== Reception ==
Andrew Sinclair of Voices of Wrestling said that "Rebellion was a decided mixed bag and a hard to show to rate. There was a lot of good. The preshow was good, two matches hit my notebook and you had two other entertaining bouts in the X-Division title match and Full Metal Mayhem. However, the PPV portion started with two bouts overrun with interference, the main event didn’t land and the Knockouts title match was one of the worst things you’ll see anywhere this year. It was ultimately a show where the promotion gave with one hand – re-signing Steve Maclin and bringing Mike Santana back into the fold – and took away with the other by having Sami Callihan and Matt Hardy return".

Phil Wheat of Nerdly.co.uk gave the overall show a 3.5 out of 5, saying "Rebellion opened on a promising note, with the Countdown pre-show delivering some great matches but by the time the main event rolled around this pay-per-view felt like it had lost its way. The big news of this show was the THREE returning stars – Sami Callihan, Mike Santana and Matt Hardy".

== Results ==
No.	Results	Stipulations	Times
1^{P}	ABC (Ace Austin and Chris Bey) and Leon Slater defeated The Rascalz (Trey Miguel, Zachary Wentz, and Myron Reed) by pinfall	Six-man tag team match	9:05
2^{P}	Laredo Kid defeated Crazzy Steve (c) by pinfall	Singles match for the TNA Digital Media Championship	8:40
3^{P}	Spitfire (Dani Luna and Jody Threat) (c) (with Lars Frederiksen) defeated Decay (Havok and Rosemary) by pinfall	Tag team match for the TNA Knockouts World Tag Team Championship	10:30
4	Mustafa Ali (c) defeated Jake Something by pinfall	Singles match for the TNA X Division Championship	11:30
5	Rich Swann (with A. J. Francis) defeated Joe Hendry by pinfall	Singles match	7:30
6	Frankie Kazarian defeated Eric Young by pinfall	Full Metal Mayhem match	15:20
7	Mike Santana defeated Steve Maclin by pinfall	Singles match	8:10
8	The System (Brian Myers and Eddie Edwards) (c) (with Alisha Edwards) defeated Speedball Mountain (Mike Bailey and Trent Seven) by pinfall	Tag team match for the TNA World Tag Team Championship	12:50
9	Josh Alexander defeated Hammerstone	Last Man Standing match	19:50
10	Jordynne Grace (c) defeated Steph De Lander (with The Good Hands (Jason Hotch and John Skyler) by pinfall	Singles match for the TNA Knockouts World Championship	12:15
11	Moose (c) defeated Nic Nemeth by pinfall	Singles match for the TNA World Championship	17:10
(c) / – the champion(s) heading into the match; P / – the match was broadcast on the pre-show
