= TNA Rebellion (2025) =

2025 Total Nonstop Action Wrestling event

Rebellion
- Promotional poster featuring various TNA wrestlers
- Promotion: Total Nonstop Action Wrestling
- Date: April 27, 2025
- City: Los Angeles, California
- Venue: Galen Center

Pay-per-view chronology
← Previous; Genesis	Next → Slammiversary

Rebellion chronology
← Previous; 2024	Next → 2026

The 2025 Rebellion was a professional wrestling pay-per-view (PPV) event produced by Total Nonstop Action Wrestling (TNA). It took place on April 27, 2025, at the Galen Center in Los Angeles, California. It was the seventh event under the Rebellion chronology and featured wrestlers from WWE's NXT brand due to the ongoing partnership between the two promotions.

Ten matches were contested at the event, including two on the pre-show. In the main event, Joe Hendry defeated Frankie Kazarian and NXT's Ethan Page to retain the TNA World Championship. In other prominent matches, The Nemeth Brothers (Nic Nemeth and Ryan Nemeth) defeated The Hardys (Jeff Hardy and Matt Hardy) to win the TNA World Tag Team Championship, Masha Slamovich defeated Tessa Blanchard to retain the TNA Knockouts World Championship, and Mike Santana defeated Mustafa Ali in a Falls Count Anywhere match. The event is also notable for the TNA debut of Indi Hartwell and an appearance by NXT wrestler Trick Williams.

== Production ==
=== Background ===
Rebellion is a professional wrestling event produced by Total Nonstop Action Wrestling. It is annually held during the month of April, and the event was first held in 2019. On December 4, 2024, TNA announced Rebellion would take place on April 27, 2025, at the Galen Center in Los Angeles, California.

=== Storylines ===
The event featured professional wrestling matches that involve different wrestlers from pre-existing scripted feuds and storylines. Wrestlers portrayed villains, heroes, or less distinguishable characters in scripted events that built tension and culminated in a wrestling match or series of matches.

Before the March 27 episode of TNA Impact! went on air, The System (Eddie Edwards, Alisha Edwards, Brian Myers, JDC, and TNA X Division Champion Moose) came to the ring for a promo. There, Edwards lambasted his teammates for what he perceived to be poor performances at Sacrifice. In particular, he singled out Moose for his title defense in a ladder match against Jeff Hardy, calling him out for being afraid of heights. As such, Edwards told Moose he needed to "face his fears" by announcing he would defend the X Division Championship at Rebellion in an Ultimate X match. On the April 3 TNA Impact!, TNA revealed Leon Slater, Matt Cardona, and El Hijo del Vikingo as the first three participants in the match. Two weeks later on April 17, KC Navarro defeated Cody Deaner to qualify for the Ultimate X match. On April 24, Sidney Akeem, who faced Moose at Unbreakable in a non-title match several days ago, was confirmed as the final participant in the match.

At Sacrifice, TNA World Champion Joe Hendry, TNA World Tag Team Champion Matt Hardy, Elijah, Leon Slater, and Nic Nemeth defeated The System (Eddie Edwards, Brian Myers, and JDC) and The Colóns (Eddie Colón and Orlando Colón) in a 10-man tag team steel cage match. However, after the match, Nic and his brother Ryan Nemeth, locked themselves in the cage with Hardy, proceeding to beat him down and cut his head open while preventing their teammates from stopping them. The Nemeths would explain their actions on the subsequent episode of TNA Impact!, claiming that Matt and his brother Jeff were taking all the credit for TNA's recent resurgence rather than Nic. They'd later proclaim that they are the best brother tag team in wrestling history. The following week, Nic defeated Slater in a singles match before he and Ryan concocted a post-match beatdown. The Hardys would run out to save Slater where'd they put a challenge out to The Nemeths for a TNA World Tag Team Championship match at Rebellion. TNA would make the match official later that night.

After making her TNA return at Final Resolution, Tessa Blanchard vowed to retake what she called "her" Knockouts division. On the February 20 episode of TNA Impact!, Blanchard would have her first interaction with TNA Knockouts World Champion Masha Slamovich, who took her place in a match after Blanchard refused to compete. On the TNA Impact!, following Sacrifice, Blanchard confronted Slamovich at the beginning of the show, letting her know that she would be targeting her title. The following week, Slamovich defeated NXT's Jacy Jayne in a non-title match with Blanchard banned from ringside. However, immediately following the match, Blanchard and Jayne attacked Slamovich before being run off by Xia Brookside and Léi Ying Lee. The week after, Blanchard teamed with Fatal Influence (Jayne and Jazmyn Nyx) to defeat Slamovich, Brookside, and Lee in a six-woman tag team match, with Blanchard pinning Slamovich to earn the victory. Later that night, TNA announced that Slamovich would defend the TNA Knockouts World Championship against Blanchard at Rebellion.

At Bound for Glory on October 26, 2024, Frankie Kazarian won the Call Your Shot Gauntlet, earning a championship match of his choosing at any time for one calendar year. Later that night, Kazarian served as the special guest referee for the TNA World Championship match between champion Nic Nemeth and Joe Hendry. Kazarian attempted to invoke his championship opportunity during the match to no avail. Over the next few months, Kazarian continued to feud with Hendry and made several unsuccessful attempts to call his shot, most notably at Genesis where Hendry defeated Nemeth to win the title. On the April 3 episode of TNA Impact!, Kazarian attacked Hendry and injured his arm (kayfabe). Hendry was subsequently taken to a nearby hospital. Later that night, Kazarian declared that he would be calling his shot for the TNA World Championship at Rebellion in his home state of California. However, NXT's Ethan Page made a surprise return to TNA and declared that after speaking with TNA Director of Authority Santino Marella, he would be challenging Hendry for the title at Rebellion (due to defeating Hendry in a match earlier in the year on NXT). Kazarian and Page subsequently brawled, with Page getting the upper hand. Later that night, TNA announced that Hendry would defend the TNA World Championship against both Kazarian and Page in a three-way match at Rebellion.

At Sacrifice, Mustafa Ali defeated Mike Santana due to interference from his cabinet Order 4 (Tasha Steelz and The Great Hands (John Skyler and Jason Hotch)). After the match, Ali took a beer from a fan and placed it in front of Santana, referencing Santana's battle with alcoholism and sobriety. On the subsequent episode of TNA Impact!, the two had a rematch with Order 4 banned from ringside. Santana won, but only via count out when Ali walked out. When asked about why he left by Gia Miller, Ali vowed that he would be the one "addiction" that Santana couldn't beat. Two weeks later, Santana showed a friend of his around who had been hired by TNA, who was also celebrating three months of sobriety. However, the man was then kidnapped by Order 4, where Ali reminded him of a car accident that he caused a year ago which left a young girl paralyzed. The man was later found unconscious by other backstage workers, seemingly having relapsed. The following week, Ali faced Ace Austin but intentionally got himself disqualified after using a chair. He was about to further assault Austin until he was confronted by Santana, and he and Order 4 retreated again. However, Santana hijacked their car and kidnapped Skyler, where he argued that Ali would rid himself of Skyler once he served his purpose to him. TNA later announced a rematch between Santana and Ali would be set for Rebellion. At Unbreakable, it was announced that the match would be a Falls Count Anywhere match.

At Unbreakable, before the main event to crown the inaugural TNA International Championship in a three-way match, it was announced that the title would be defended at Rebellion against the participant who was not involved in the decision. Steve Maclin would defeat Eric Young and A. J. Francis, the latter of whom he pinned, to become the inaugural champion. Later that night, it was announced that Maclin would defend the TNA International Championship against Young at Rebellion.

At Sacrifice, Ash by Elegance and Heather by Elegance defeated Spitfire (Dani Luna and Jody Threat) in a 3-on-2 handicap match with their manager, The Personal Concierge, to win the TNA Knockouts World Tag Team Championship. As they were celebrating, however, they were confronted by NXT wrestlers Lash Legend and Jakara Jackson of Meta-Four. The subsequent episode of TNA Impact! would feature Ash and Heather attempting to have a proper celebration, complete with Ash making a wish on a cake, but were interrupted by Spitfire, Meta-Four, and later Gigi Dolin and Tatum Paxley; the confrontation escalating into a massive brawl. This led to a non-title match between Ash and Heather, and Dolin and Paxley, with the champions securing the win. Post-match, Ash was about to blow out her cake from last week, but Dolin and Paxley would end up slamming her face into it. A distraught Ash would take a brief sabbatical from TNA after the incident. The week after, Meta-Four would defeat Spitfire in a tag team match. Two weeks later on April 17, Dolin and Paxley defeated Heather and interim partner Maggie Lee, with Dolin pinning Heather for the win. Backstage, a distressed Heather, Lee, and the Personal Concierge worried over how Ash would react to the loss before being confronted again by the three other teams, who all wanted a title match. After much yelling between the three teams, Heather relented and granted all of them a four-way tag team match for the titles at Rebellion.

== Results ==
No.	Results	Stipulations	Times
1^{P}	Fatal Influence (Fallon Henley, Jacy Jayne, and Jazmyn Nyx) defeated Rosemary, Xia Brookside, and Léi Ying Lee by pinfall	Six-woman tag team match	9:00
2^{P}	Elijah defeated Shane Haste by pinfall	Singles match	6:00
3	Moose (c) defeated KC Navarro, Leon Slater, Matt Cardona, El Hijo del Vikingo, and Sidney Akeem	Ultimate X match for TNA X Division Championship	15:20
4	Ash by Elegance and Heather by Elegance (c) (with The Personal Concierge) defeated The Meta-Four (Jakara Jackson and Lash Legend), Spitfire (Dani Luna and Jody Threat), and Gigi Dolin and Tatum Paxley by pinfall	Four-way tag team match for the TNA Knockouts World Tag Team Championship	9:35
5	Ace Austin and The Rascalz (Trey Miguel and Zachary Wentz) (with Sean Waltman) defeated The System (Brian Myers, Eddie Edwards, and Moose) (Note: JDC was originally scheduled to be in the match, but was unable to compete due to travel issues.) (with Alisha Edwards) by pinfall	Six-man tag team match	11:10
6	Steve Maclin (c) defeated Eric Young (with Judas Icarus and Travis Williams) by pinfall	Singles match for the TNA International Championship	9:25
7	Mike Santana defeated Mustafa Ali by pinfall	Falls Count Anywhere match	19:25
8	Masha Slamovich (c) defeated Tessa Blanchard by submission	Singles match for the TNA Knockouts World Championship	14:00
9	The Nemeth Brothers (Nic Nemeth and Ryan Nemeth) defeated The Hardys (Jeff Hardy and Matt Hardy) (c) by pinfall	Tag team match for the TNA World Tag Team Championship	12:00
10	Joe Hendry (c) defeated Frankie Kazarian and Ethan Page by pinfall	Three-way match for the TNA World Championship; This was Kazarian's Call Your Shot championship match.	13:40
(c) / – the champion(s) heading into the match; P / – the match was broadcast on the pre-show
