= TNA Rebellion =

Rebellion
- TNA Rebellion 2024 logo
- Promotion: Total Nonstop Action Wrestling
- First event: 2019

Rebellion is a professional wrestling pay-per-view event produced by Total Nonstop Action Wrestling, which is annually held during the month of April. The event was first held in 2019, and it has since become one of the promotion's "Big Four" events (along with Hard to Kill, Slammiversary, and Bound for Glory).

== History ==
=== 2019 ===
The inaugural Rebellion event took place on April 28, 2019 at The Rebel Complex in Toronto, Ontario, Canada and did 2,200 buys. Eight professional wrestling matches were contested at the event. The main event was a Full Metal Mayhem match for the Impact World Tag Team Championship, in which The Lucha Brothers (Pentagón Jr. and Fénix) defended the titles against The Latin American Xchange (Santana and Ortiz). LAX won the match and the tag team titles, marking Lucha Brothers' last match in Impact.

The undercard also notably saw Brian Cage defeat Johnny Impact to capture his first Impact World Championship, Michael Elgin's Impact debut by attacking Cage after the match and Tessa Blanchard defeating Gail Kim in what would be Kim's retirement match, which was considered Kim's "passing of the torch" to Blanchard and also marked the beginning of Blanchard's rise as the company's most popular wrestler and her gradual rise to main event status.

=== 2020 ===
On January 13, 2020, Impact Wrestling announced on its Twitter account that it would be holding a second Rebellion event in April at Terminal 5 in New York, New York. It was later announced that the event would take place on April 19. Due to the COVID-19 pandemic, however, the event was rescheduled and taped on a closed set at Skyway Studios in Nashville, Tennessee between April 8 and 10. It aired on tape delay as a two-part special episode of Impact! on April 21 and 28.

Impact World Champion Tessa Blanchard was unable to attend the tapings, thus canceling the event's planned world championship match in which she was to defend the title against Michael Elgin and Eddie Edwards. In the main event of the April 21 broadcast, Ken Shamrock defeated Sami Callihan by technical submission in an unsanctioned match, while in the main event of the April 28 broadcast, Moose defeated Hernandez and Michael Elgin in a three-way match. After the match, Moose declared himself the TNA World Heavyweight Champion.

== Events ==
#	Event	Date	City	Venue	Main event	Ref.
1	Impact Wrestling Rebellion (2019)	April 28, 2019	Toronto, Ontario, Canada	The Rebel Complex	The Lucha Brothers (Pentagón Jr. and Fénix) (c) vs. The Latin American Xchange (Santana and Ortiz) in a Full Metal Mayhem match for the Impact World Tag Team Championship	
2	Impact Wrestling Rebellion (2020)	April 21, 2020 (Note: The event was taped on April 8–10, 2020.)	Nashville, Tennessee	Skyway Studios	Ken Shamrock vs. Sami Callihan in an unsanctioned match	
2	Impact Wrestling Rebellion (2020)	April 28, 2020	Nashville, Tennessee	Skyway Studios	Hernandez vs. Michael Elgin vs. Moose (c) in a three-way match for the TNA World Heavyweight Championship	
3	Impact Wrestling Rebellion (2021)	April 25, 2021	Nashville, Tennessee	Skyway Studios	Rich Swann (Impact) vs. Kenny Omega (AEW) in a title vs. title match for the Impact World Championship and the AEW World Championship	
4	Impact Wrestling Rebellion (2022)	April 23, 2022	Poughkeepsie, New York	Majed J. Nesheiwat Convention Center	Moose (c) vs. Josh Alexander for the Impact World Championship	
5	Impact Wrestling Rebellion (2023)	April 16, 2023	Toronto, Ontario, Canada	Rebel Entertainment Complex	Deonna Purrazzo vs. Jordynne Grace for the vacant Impact Knockouts World Championship	
6	TNA Rebellion (2024)	April 20, 2024	Paradise, Nevada	Palms Casino Resort	Moose (c) vs. Nic Nemeth for the TNA World Championship	
7	TNA Rebellion (2025)	April 27, 2025	Los Angeles, California	Galen Center	Joe Hendry (c) vs. Frankie Kazarian vs. Ethan Page for the TNA World Championship	
8	TNA Rebellion (2026)	April 11, 2026	Cleveland, Ohio	Wolstein Center	Mike Santana (c) vs. Eddie Edwards for the TNA World Championship	
(c) – refers to the champion(s) heading into the match
