= Impact Wrestling Rebellion (2019) =

2019 Impact Wrestling pay-per-view event

Rebellion (2019)
- Promotional poster featuring various Impact wrestlers
- Promotion: Impact Wrestling
- Date: April 28, 2019
- City: Toronto, Ontario, Canada
- Venue: The Rebel Complex
- Buy rate: 2,200

Pay-per-view chronology
← Previous; United We Stand	Next → Slammiversary XVII

Rebellion chronology
← Previous; First	Next → 2020

The 2019 Rebellion was a professional wrestling pay-per-view (PPV) event produced by Impact Wrestling. The event took place on April 28, 2019, at The Rebel Complex in Toronto, Ontario, Canada. It was the first event in the Rebellion chronology.

Eight matches were contested at the event. In the main event, The Latin American Xchange (Santana and Ortiz) defeated The Lucha Bros (Fénix and Pentagón Jr.) in a Full Metal Mayhem match to win the Impact World Tag Team Championship. In other prominent matches, Brian Cage defeated Johnny Impact to win the Impact World Championship, Tessa Blanchard defeated Gail Kim, Rich Swann defeated Sami Callihan in an "oVe" Rules match to retain the X Division Championship, and Taya Valkyrie defeated Jordynne Grace to retain the Impact Knockouts Championship.

== Storylines ==
The event featured professional wrestling matches that involve different wrestlers from pre-existing scripted feuds and storylines. Wrestlers portrayed villains, heroes, or less distinguishable characters in the scripted events that built tension and culminated in a wrestling match or series of matches.

On the February 1, 2019, edition of Impact!, Impact Wrestling announced the date for Rebellion.

== Event ==
Other on-screen personnel
Role:	Name:
Commentators	Josh Mathews
Commentators	Don Callis
Ring announcer	Jeffery Scott
Interviewer	Melissa Santos

=== Preliminary matches ===
The pay-per-view opened with a six-way match, which involved Ace Austin, Aiden Prince, Eddie Edwards, Jake Crist, Jake Deaner and Petey Williams. In the end of the match, Williams performed the Canadian Destroyer on Deaner, and as he went to pin him, Austin sunset flipped Williams to win the match.

Next, Rohit Raju (accompanied by Gama Singh and Raj Singh) faced Scarlett Bordeaux (accompanied by Fallah Bahh) in an intergender match. With Fahh distracting the referee, Bordeaux low blowed Raju and performed a cradle back-to-belly piledriver to win the match.

After that, Moose and The North (Ethan Page and Josh Alexander) faced The Rascalz (Dezmond Xavier, Trey Miguel and Zachary Wentz). The north performed a double team move on Xavier, which Moose followed it with a spear to pin Xavier and win the match for his team.

In the following match, Taya Valkyrie defended the Impact Knockouts Championship against Jordynne Grace. In the end, Valkyire performed the Road to Valhalla to win the match and to retain the championship.

After that, Rich Swann defended the Impact X Division Championship against Sami Callihan in a "oVe Rules" match. Swann knocked Calliahn down with a barbwire baseball bat. Swann later used the bat to apply a crossface to submit Calliahn and to retain the championship.

Next, Gail Kim came out of retirement to face Tessa Blanchard. Blancahrd's father Tully Blanchard and Kim's husband Robert Irvine were in the crowd. After Kim kicked out of Blanchard's Magnum, Blanchard quickly reversed it into a modified anaconda vise to make Kim tap out. After the match, Blanchard and Kim shook hands and hugged.

After that, Johnny Impact (accompanied by his wife Taya Valkyrie and John E Bravo) defended the Impact World Championship against Brian Cage, with Lance Storm serving as the special guest referee. Cage was able to outcome Bravo and Valkyrie's interference, and in the end, he performed the Drill Claw to win the championship for the first time. After that match, Michael Elgin made his Impact debut, he entered the ring and performed a spinning powerbomb on Cage.

=== Main event ===
In the main event, The Lucha Bros (Fénix and Pentagón Jr.) defended the Impact World Tag Team Championship against The Latin American Xchange (Santana and Ortiz) (accompanied by Konnan) in a Full Metal Mayhem match. In the end, Santana stabbed Pentagón Jr. in the head with a fork as both stood on a ladder, with Ortiz following that by powerbombing Pentagón Jr. into a table covered by thumbtacks to win the championship for the fourth time. After the match, both teams hugged, as the Impact's roster came to the ring to celebrate with The Latin American Xchange.

== Aftermath ==
Brian Cage confirmed that he got injured during his match with Johnny Impact by taking a "Spanish Fly" of the ramp to the floor, performed by Impact. Cage said that he is going to be out of in-ring action for a while.

== Results ==
No.	Results	Stipulations	Times
1	Ace Austin defeated Aiden Prince, Eddie Edwards, Jake Crist, Jake Deaner and Petey Williams	Six-way match	5:17
2	Scarlett Bordeaux (with Fallah Bahh) defeated Rohit Raju (with Gama Singh and Raj Singh)	Intergender match	5:01
3	Moose and The North (Ethan Page and Josh Alexander) defeated The Rascalz (Dezmond Xavier, Trey Miguel and Zachary Wentz)	Six-man tag team match	9:25
4	Taya Valkyrie (c) defeated Jordynne Grace	Singles match for the Impact Knockouts Championship	8:59
5	Rich Swann (c) defeated Sami Callihan by submission	"oVe Rules" match for the Impact X Division Championship	16:04
6	Tessa Blanchard defeated Gail Kim by submission	Singles match	13:00
7	Brian Cage defeated Johnny Impact (c) (with John E Bravo and Taya Valkyrie)	Singles match for the Impact World Championship; Lance Storm was the special guest referee	13:16
8	The Latin American Xchange (Santana and Ortiz) (with Konnan) defeated The Lucha Bros (Fénix and Pentagón Jr.) (c)	Full Metal Mayhem match for the Impact World Tag Team Championship	20:49
(c) / – the champion(s) heading into the match

== See also ==
- 2019 in professional wrestling
- Professional wrestling in Canada
