= Impact Wrestling Against All Odds (2021) =

2021 Impact Wrestling event

Against All Odds (2021)
- Promotional poster
- Promotion: Impact Wrestling
- Date: June 12, 2021
- City: Nashville, Tennessee; Jacksonville, Florida (main event)
- Venue: Skyway Studios; Daily's Place (main event)
- Attendance: 0 (behind closed doors) (Note: The event was held without a paying audience due to the COVID-19 pandemic in the United States.)

Impact Plus Monthly Specials chronology
← Previous; Under Siege	Next → Homecoming

Against All Odds chronology
← Previous; 2019	Next → 2022

The 2021 Against All Odds was a professional wrestling event produced by Impact Wrestling. It took place on June 12, 2021, and aired exclusively on Impact Plus. It was held at Skyway Studios in Nashville, Tennessee, except for the main event, which was taped at Daily's Place in Jacksonville, Florida. It was the 10th event under the Against All Odds chronology and the first to be held since the 2019 event.

Nine matches were contested at the event. In the main event, Kenny Omega defeated Moose to retain the Impact World Championship. In other prominent matches, Violent By Design (Deaner and Rhino) defeated Decay (Black Taurus and Crazzy Steve) to retain the Impact World Tag Team Championship, Joe Doering defeated Satoshi Kojima, and Deonna Purrazzo defeated Rosemary to retain the Impact Knockouts Championship. The event also marked the return of The Young Bucks (Matt and Nick Jackson; formerly known as Max and Jeremy Buck of Generation Me).

The event received positive reviews from critics, with much praise being directed to both the Knockouts and Impact World title matches.

== Production ==
=== Background ===
Against All Odds was an annual professional wrestling event produced by Impact Wrestling (then known as Total Nonstop Action Wrestling) between 2005 and 2012. In 2013, TNA discontinued most of its monthly pay-per-view events in favor of the new pre-recorded One Night Only events. It was revived as a special episode of Impact! that aired on March 29, 2019. On April 25, 2021 at Rebellion, it was announced by Impact that Against All Odds would take place on June 12, 2021 at the Skyway Studios in Nashville, Tennessee.

=== Storylines ===
The event featured professional wrestling matches that involved different wrestlers from pre-existing scripted feuds and storylines. Storylines were produced on Impact's weekly television program and on All Elite Wrestling's (AEW) weekly program Dynamite.

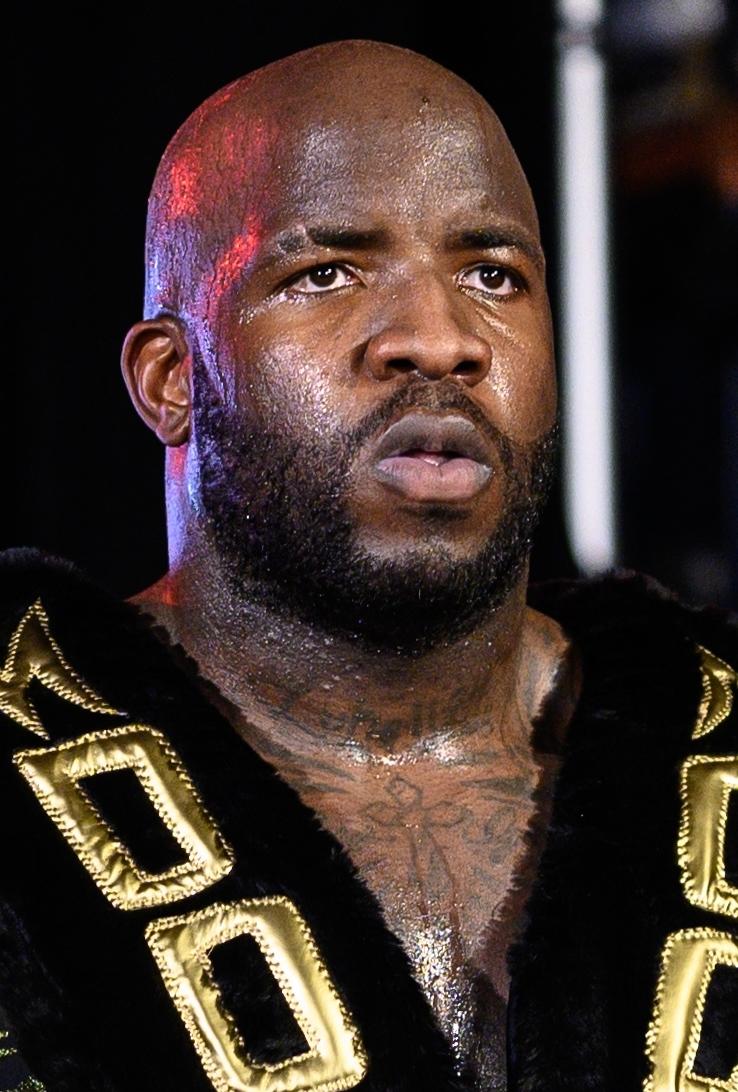
Moose won a six-way match at Under Siege to become the number one contender for the Impact World Championship.

At Under Siege, Moose defeated Chris Bey, Chris Sabin, Matt Cardona, Sami Callihan, and Trey Miguel in a six-way match to become the number one contender for the Impact World Championship at Against All Odds. During the go-home show of Impact! ahead of the PPV, All Elite Wrestling (AEW) President and Chief Executive Officer Tony Khan appeared to confirm that the main event match between Moose and defending champion Kenny Omega, an AEW wrestler, would take place at Daily's Place in Jacksonville, Florida, the home of AEW, to ensure that Callihan would not interfere. It was also announced that the winner of the match would defend the title against Callihan in the main event of Slammiversary. Callihan himself was scheduled to team with Tommy Dreamer in a street fight against The Good Brothers (Doc Gallows and Karl Anderson) at Against All Odds.

On the May 20 episode of Impact!, it was announced that New Japan Pro-Wrestling (NJPW) legend Satoshi Kojima would make his Impact debut the next week. During his debut, Kojima confronted new Impact World Tag Team Champions Violent By Design (Eric Young, Deaner, Joe Doering, and Rhino), and stood up to old rival Joe Doering, laying down a challenge for Against All Odds. On the June 3 episode of Impact!, after Kojima defeated Deaner, VBD was confronted by Decay's Black Taurus and Crazzy Steve, who challenged them to a tag team title match at the event, which Young accepted.

At Under Siege, Deonna Purrazzo defeated Havok to retain the Impact Knockouts Championship. On the subsequent episode of Impact!, after Tenille Dashwood defeated Impact Knockouts Tag Team Champion Kiera Hogan, a huge Knockouts melee broke out between Dashwood, Havok, Taylor Wilde, Purrazzo, Kimber Lee, Susan, and Fire 'N Flava (Hogan and Tasha Steelz). Purrazzo, Lee, Susan, and Fire 'N Flava attempted to prematurely flee before being stopped at the entranceway by Decay (Rosemary, Black Taurus, and Crazzy Steve). On the May 27 episode, Rosemary led a team consisting of Havok, Dashwood, Rachael Ellering, and Jordynne Grace (Wilde's replacement after she no-showed) to a victory over Purrazzo, Lee, Susan, and Fire 'N Flava, where Rosemary pinned the Knockouts Champion Purrazzo. It was then announced that Rosemary would challenge Purrazzo for the title at Against All Odds. The following week, after Fire 'N Flava defended the Knockouts Tag Team Championship against former champions Grace and Ellering, it was brought to them that Kimber Lee and Susan would be their next opponents at Against All Odds. Also that night, a match between Rosemary and Havok was set for next week, where Havok was able to be a part of the Knockouts Championship match if she won, but the match was won by Rosemary. Additionally, on June 10, Dashwood, who had been trying to find a tag team partner for months, and recently eyed up Ellering, was challenged by Grace on her interview segment, "All About Me", to a match at Against All Odds.

At Under Siege, W. Morrissey defeated Willie Mack, but before Morrissey could inflict more damage post-match, Rich Swann came down to save his friend Mack. On the May 27 episode of Impact!, Morrissey had a sit-down interview with Gia Miller, before Swann jumped him from behind. The following week, Swann and Morrissey were scheduled for a match, only for Morrissey to jump Swann, this time before the bell rang. It was later announced that Swann and Morrissey would have their match at Against All Odds.

On the June 3 episode of Impact, after Josh Alexander defended the Impact X Division Championship against TJP in a 60 minute iron man match, he proclaimed that until the Impact World Championship returned to the company, he, as X Division Champion, was the "king of the mountain" in Impact. After that statement, several X Division stars, including Petey Williams, Trey Miguel, Ace Austin, Chris Bey, and Rohit Raju, squabbled for the next shot. It was later announced that these five men would compete for the number one contendership at Against All Odds.

== Event ==
Other on-screen personnel
Commentators	Josh Mathews
Commentators	D'Lo Brown
Commentators	Tony Schiavone (Main event)
Commentators	Scott D'Amore (Main event)
Commentators	Don Callis (Main event)
Ring announcers	David Penzer
Ring announcers	Justin Roberts (Main event)
Referees	Brian Hebner
Referees	Brandon Tolle
Referees	Daniel Spencer
Interviewer	Gia Miller

=== Preliminary matches ===
The opening match of the event was a street fight between The Good Brothers (Doc Gallows and Karl Anderson) against the team of Sami Callihan and Tommy Dreamer. Both teams brawl on the outside, with Gallows and Callihan attacking each other with a chair, and Dreamer using the ring bell on Anderson before sending him inside the ring. Back in the ring, Gallows and Callihan trade punches with each other, the latter using a bicycle kick to send the former outside. Dreamer leads Callihan backstage and return with trash cans filled with weapons, the former hitting Anderson with a trash can lid, and the latter using a street sign on Gallows. Anderson brawls with Dreamer on the outside, while in the ring, Gallows attacks Callihan with a chain and a frying pan. Callihan retaliates by using the chain to hog tie Gallows, but Anderson stop him and gives Gallows a chance to send Callihan outside with the frying pan. The Good Brothers beat down on Dreamer while keeping Callihan from getting in, but Dreamer fights back with a cutter on Anderson and a DDT on Gallows for a two count. Anderson hits Dreamer with a spinebuster, but Callihan stops the referee from making the count. The Good Brothers set up a table in the ring and use the "Magic Killer" on Dreamer to break it, but Callihan stops the pin attempt by hitting both of them with a baseball bat, pinning Anderson to win for his team.

The second match saw Joe Doering (with Eric Young, Deaner and Rhino) against Satoshi Kojima (with Eddie Edwards). After trading blows with each other, Kojima uses a shoulder block to take Doering off his feet. Doering takes control of the match by punching and choking Kojima, before putting him in a Boston crab that he's able to get out. Doering continues the assault by working on Kojima's arm, and slamming him before landing an elbow as well. Kojima comes back with some quick chops and an elbow, before hitting a top-rope elbow on Doering for a two count. Doering gets a spinebuster on Kojima that sends him to the outside, but gets tripped up while on the apron, allowing Rhino to attack Kojima while the referee is distracted but gets thrown into the rails. Kojima lands a DDT on Doering for a two count, but gets crushed with a running crossbody block from the latter, kicking out at two. Kojima hits a clothesline to Doering's back followed by a cutter, but as he runs the ropes, Doering plants Kojima with a Death Valley driver and clothesline combo for a near fall. Doering hits a spinning sitout powerbomb on Kojima for the win.

Next, a five-way match was contested between Petey Williams, Trey Miguel, Ace Austin, Chris Bey and Rohit Raju, where the winner will be the number one contender to Josh Alexander's X Division Championship. Williams takes control of the match with a dropkick/senton combo on Raju and Bey. Bey hits an enzuigiri on Williams and Austin sends him to the outside before going after Bey. Miguel does a dive to everyone outside the ring and goes after Austin. Miguel and Williams apply sharpshooters on Austin and Bey respectively, slug it out with each other, but Raju takes them out with some kicks. Raju hits a falcon arrow on Bey and rolls up Miguel for two, then suplexes Miguel and Williams to maintain control. Bey gets Raju in a torture rack and transitions into a neckbreaker. Austin takes out Bey and Raju with a double leg drop and battles it out with Williams. Williams counters a superplex attempt by Austin and hits the "Canadian Destroyer" off the top rope, but Miguel stops the pin. Madman Fulton appears and takes Miguel off the top rope onto the floor. After taking everyone out inside the ring, Fulton places Austin on top for the pin, but the referee declared the match a no contest.

The fourth match was W. Morrissey versus Rich Swann. Morrissey overpowers Swann early on before the latter dropkicks him to the outside and hits a swanton on Morrissey. Back in the ring, Swann gets hit with a boot in mid-air by Morrissey, who continues to assault him both in and out of the ring. Swann fights back by pushing Morrissey to the post and hits a 450° splash from the apron onto him. The two head back in the ring and Swann hits another 450° on Morrissey for a two count. Swann hits a "Phoenix Splash" but Morrissey catches him and delivers an F-5. Morrissey hits a splash on Swann in the corner, who manages to escape a chokeslam attempt, but gets hit with a boot to the spine. After hitting two consecutive powerbombs, Morrissey is given the middle finger by Swann, and delivers a running powerbomb on him for the pin.

Next, a knockouts match saw Tenille Dashwood (with Kaleb with a K) against Jordynne Grace (with Rachael Ellering). Grace dominates Dashwood with charges to the corner, clotheslines and a spinning full nelson. After whipping Dashwood into the corners, Grace goes for a baseball slide but gets caught by Dashwood and Kaleb, who attack her while the referee deals with Ellering. Back in the ring, Dashwood goes after Grace's arms and shoulders, leading to a tarantula on the ropes. Grace catches Dashwood's splash attempt and hits a fallaway slam. After the two trade strikes with each other, Grace slams Dashwood before hitting the double knees, an elbow and a Vader Bomb, but only gets a two count. Dashwood lands a top-rope crossbody on Grace for two, hits a neckbreaker through the ropes, but Grace breaks the pin using said ropes. Grace applies a rear naked choke on Dashwood but Kaleb distracts the referee from the apron, leading to Ellering taking out Kaleb and getting yelled at by Grace, allowing Dashwood to wrap her up for the win. After the match, Grace and Ellering argue on the ramp, the latter telling the former that their getting to her head. Grace goes back in the ring to attack Dashwood and Kaleb, giving the latter a Michinoku Driver, and heads to the ramp by herself.

The sixth match involved Fire 'N Flava (Kiera Hogan and Tasha Steelz) defending the Knockouts Tag Team Championship against Kimber Lee and Susan. Fire 'N Flava get the early advantage on Lee before her knee buckles and the referee checks on her. Susan attacks Steelz from the outside, before Lee gives the latter a spin kick, revealing she was okay. Lee and Susan tag each other and attack Steelz in their corner. Steelz hits a hurricanrana and tags in Hogan, before double teaming on a tagged in Susan, who then tags Lee and they perform a double team on Hogan. Susan hits the superplex on Steelz, Lee tags her in before landing a swanton on Hogan, but Susan only gets a near fall. Steelz makes a blind tag to hit a missile dropkick on Lee and get the frog splash on Susan for the pin, allowing Fire 'N Flava to retain their tag titles.

The seventh match saw Violent By Design (Deaner and Rhino) (with Eric Young) defend the Impact World Tag Team Championship against Decay (Black Taurus and Crazzy Steve). Deaner and Steve lock up to start the match, with the former being taken down by him and a tagged in Taurus, both times going outside to Young for advice. Rhino tags in and hits a shoulder tackle on Taurus, who then targets Rhino's arm and tags Steve to continue the assault. Rhino and Deaner choke Steve on the middle rope, who tags in Taurus to go after Deaner, but gets clotheslined by Rhino from the apron. Deaner and Rhino tag each other to beat down on Taurus, the former applying a headlock that he gets out from and lands a crossbody block. Steve gets the tag and hits a neckbreaker on Deaner before applying a crossface, and delivers a DDT off the ropes that gets a two count. Deaner returns with punches and a running knee to Steve, who answers back with a flatliner and tags in Taurus. After double teaming on Deaner, Steve hits a swanton but his pin gets interrupted by Rhino, who sends Taurus to the outside. Steve lands a cannonball on Deaner in the corner, who gets told by Young that "you should know better" before getting attacked by Rhino from behind, and Deaner hits a DDT to win the match and retain the tag titles.

In the penultimate match, Deonna Purrazzo defended the Impact Knockouts Championship against Rosemary. The two begin brawling with each other before Rosemary gets the advantage with a couple of sling blades and applies the "Upside Down" on Purrazzo. On the outside, Rosemary slams Purrazzo's head on the apron, and hits a T-Bone suplex on the ramp. Purrazzo goes after Rosemary's arm by ramming it to the post, and wrapping around it to hit a bicycle kick. Purrazzo continues to attack the arm and cuts off Rosemary's comeback to regain control. After they clothesline each other, Rosemary suplexes Purrazzo and goes for a chinlock but they start exchanging submission holds, before Purrazzo hits a Russian legsweep and transitions into the "Venus de Milo" that Rosemary breaks by grabbing the ropes. Purrazzo sits on Rosemary to remove her knee brace and delivers a pump kick, but Rosemary sits up and hits a spear for a near fall. Purrazzo delivers the "Cosa Nostra" for the win and retains her title.

=== Main event ===
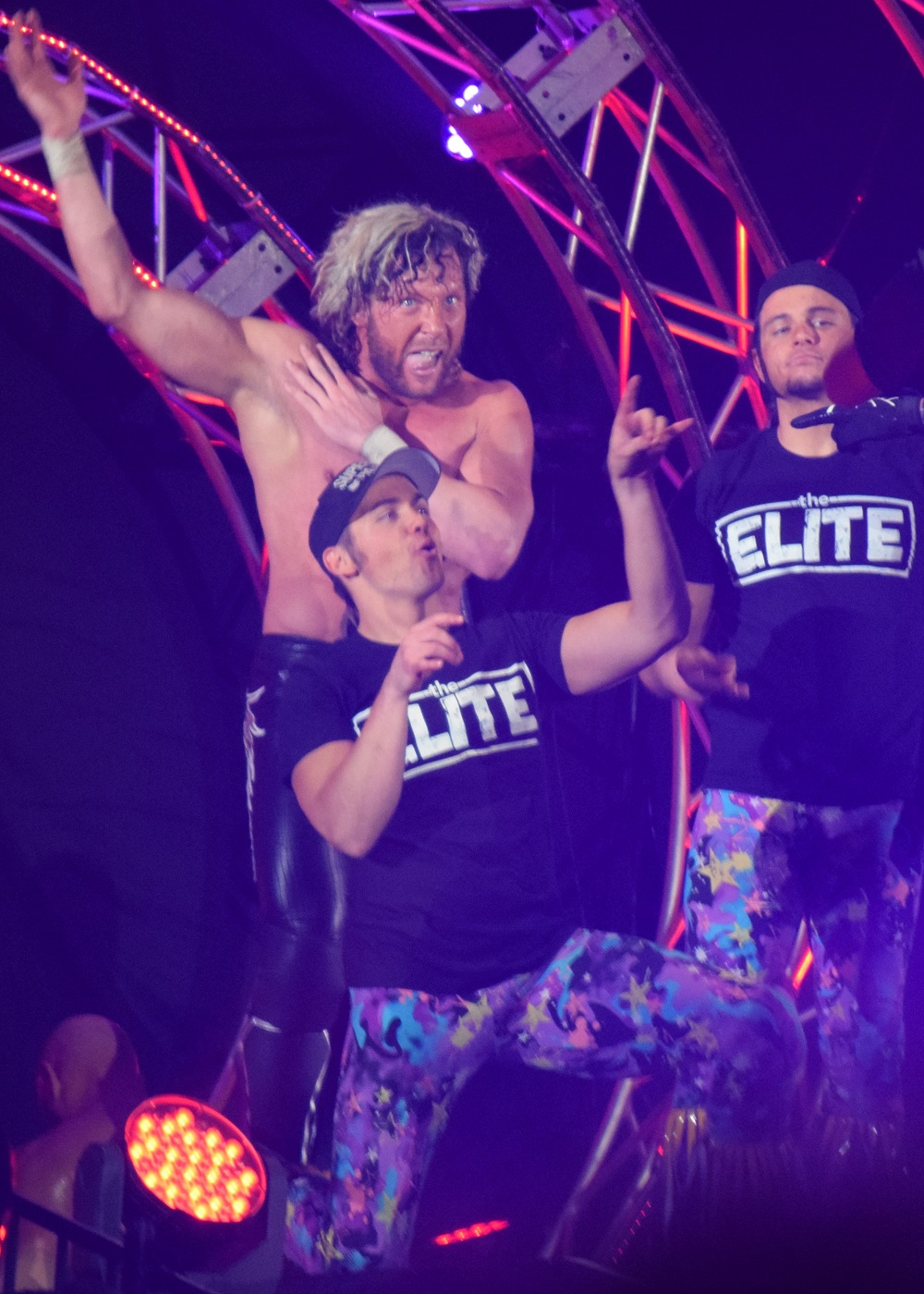
Kenny Omega retained the Impact World Championship with some help from The Young Bucks (Matt and Nick Jackson).

In the main event, Kenny Omega defended the Impact World Championship against Moose, taking place at Daily's Place in Jacksonville, Florida. Moose backs Omega into the ropes, forcing him to leave the ring. Omega goes for the "One-Winged Angel" but can't get Moose up on his shoulders. Omega sends Moose to the outside, boots him off the apron, and hits a dive over the ropes. Moose catches Omega coming off the ropes, brushes off a chop, but gets his knee clipped. Omega misses the moonsault and Moose immediately hits a standing moonsault afterwards. Moose goes after Omega's back with stomps and whipping him into the turnbuckles. Outside the ring, Moose sends Omega into the barricade, but flies over him and into some chairs. Omega works on Moose's shoulder by ramming it into the post, and continues the damage back in the ring. Moose gets a big boot on Omega, who answers back with an armbar, but gets laid out with a powerbomb. Moose hits a running uppercut and some dropkicks, and lands the "Go to Hell" on Omega for a two count. Omega delivers a snap dragon suplex and two "V-Triggers" but Moose kicks out. After trading forearms, Moose lands a headbutt on Omega who returns with a clothesline and a double underhook slam, but only gets a two. Omega hits a couple "V-Triggers" on Moose, goes for the "One-Winged Angel", but Moose escapes to hit a ripcord lariat. After being checked by the doctor for his shoulder, Moose gets hit with another "V-Trigger" by Omega, but catches him on the top rope and hits a Spanish fly for a near fall. Moose goes for the "Lights Out" on Omega but hits the referee as well. The Young Bucks (Matt and Nick Jackson) arrive to hit three superkicks and a "BTE Trigger" on Moose, hoist him up on Omega's shoulders as he delivers the "One-Winged Angel" and pins him to retain the title.

After the match, Omega and the Bucks celebrate as the lights went out, and Sami Callihan appears. Callihan takes them out with a baseball bat and gets told by Don Callis that he's his boss and must leave. Callihan grabs a chair from under the ring and places it on top of Omega, but Callis tells him that he's fired. Callis and Scott D'Amore argue to the back and Callihan yells "bullshit" as the show fades to black.

== Reception ==
Jack Irene of 411Mania reviewed the event and gave it an 8 out of 10, which was higher than 2019's event that got a 7 out of 10. He wrote that: "This was a great IMPACT Plus show with constant quality and importance throughout the card. A good way to build interest for Slammiversary while also standing out on its own. The main event was special and had some solid storyline progression despite the anticlimactic finish. The undercard shined as well, with a good flow and consistency. Certainly check this card out, great stuff with more exciting things on the horizon from IMPACT." Darrin Lilly of PWTorch praised the X-Division five-way for being a "good, fast paced match" despite the "disappointing" conclusion, the Purrazzo-Rosemary bout for continuing "Deonna's streak of strong Knockouts Title matches" and the Impact Title main event for being an "excellent match" that's pegged down by a "cheap ending", concluding that: "Impact has the formula down pat for these Impact Plus specials and they delivered another fun night of entertainment. The night was highlighted by a great main event and set the table for one of their biggest shows of the year." Bob Kapur of Slam Wrestling called it "a show that was full of decent matches" and highlighted the final two title matches for delivering on their end. He rated the event 4 out of 5 stars, concluding that: "This show demonstrated how good the AEW-Impact crossover can be – hopefully they can build on this even more heading into Slammiversary. That, and the potential arrivals of some recent WWE departees could poise Impact very well for the rest of the year."

== Aftermath ==
On the June 17 episode of Impact!, Tommy Dreamer - acting as a spokesman for the Anthem Sports & Entertainment board of directors - announced that the board had reinstated Sami Callihan and fired Don Callis from his EVP role, making the Impact World Championship main event between Callihan and Kenny Omega official at Slammiversary.

On the June 17 episode of Impact!, Moose attempted to hijack the show and get Scott D'Amore's attention after being screwed by Kenny Omega in his Impact world title match at Against All Odds. Chris Sabin, who got his knee injured at Under Siege, returns and stops Moose's plans. Backstage, Sabin challenged Moose to a match at Slammiversary, which he accepted.

On the June 17 episode of Impact!, it was announced that Josh Alexander will defend the X Division Championship at Slammiversary against Petey Williams, Trey Miguel, Ace Austin, Chris Bey, and Rohit Raju in an Ultimate X match, the first to be promoted in over two years.

On the June 24 episode of Impact!, Violent By Design (Deaner and Joe Doering) retained the Impact World Tag Team Championship against Eddie Edwards and Satoshi Kojima. The following week, they interrupted a tag team match between the team of Rich Swann and Willie Mack and the team of TJP and Fallah Bahh, a match that had big tag team title implications. On the July 8 episode of Impact!, they were confronted by both teams, along with The Good Brothers, who wanted to become champions again. Impact's new advisor Tommy Dreamer then appeared, stating that Violent By Design will defend the titles against all challengers in a four-way tag team match at Slammiversary.

== Results ==
No.	Results	Stipulations	Times
1	Sami Callihan and Tommy Dreamer defeated The Good Brothers (Doc Gallows and Karl Anderson) by pinfall	Street Fight	11:09
2	Joe Doering (with Eric Young, Deaner, and Rhino) defeated Satoshi Kojima (with Eddie Edwards) by pinfall	Singles match	9:02
3	Petey Williams vs. Trey Miguel vs. Ace Austin vs. Chris Bey vs. Rohit Raju ended in a no contest	X Division Five-way match to determine the #1 contender for the Impact X Division Championship at Slaammiversary	12:25
4	W. Morrissey defeated Rich Swann by pinfall	Singles match	11:43
5	Tenille Dashwood (with Kaleb with a K) defeated Jordynne Grace (with Rachael Ellering) by pinfall	Singles match	10:58
6	Fire 'N Flava (Kiera Hogan and Tasha Steelz) (c) defeated Kimber Lee and Susan by pinfall	Tag team match for the Impact Knockouts Tag Team Championship	9:12
7	Violent By Design (Deaner and Rhino) (c) (with Eric Young) defeated Decay (Black Taurus and Crazzy Steve) by pinfall	Tag team match for the Impact World Tag Team Championship	10:37
8	Deonna Purrazzo (c) defeated Rosemary by pinfall	Singles match for the Impact Knockouts Championship	12:01
9	Kenny Omega (c) defeated Moose by pinfall	Singles match for the Impact World Championship; Match took place at AEW's home base of Daily's Place in Jacksonville, Florida	22:51
(c) / – the champion(s) heading into the match
