= Impact Wrestling Against All Odds (2019) =

2019 professional wrestling special

Against All Odds (2019)
- Promotion: Impact Wrestling
- Date: February 17, 2019 (aired March 29, 2019)
- City: Sunrise Manor, Nevada
- Venue: Sam’s Town Casino

Against All Odds chronology
← Previous; 2012	Next → 2021

Impact! special episodes chronology
← Previous; Uncaged	Next → Total Nonstop Action Wrestling Special!

The 2019 Against All Odds was a professional wrestling television special produced by Impact Wrestling, which took place on February 17, 2019 at Sam's Town Casino in Sunrise Manor, Nevada. It was the ninth event under the Against All Odds chronology. Unlike the previous events, this event was a special episode of the weekly Impact television broadcast, airing on Pursuit Channel and Twitch on March 29.

Three professional wrestling matches were contested at the event. The main event featured Brian Cage taking on Killer Kross, which Cage lost after interference by Johnny Impact and Taya Valkyrie. On the undercard, Valkyrie retained the Knockouts Championship against Jordynne Grace by getting counted out and Scarlett Bordeaux defeated Glenn Gilbertti in an intergender match. The event featured the final appearance of Allie in Impact Wrestling.

== Production ==
=== Background ===
Against All Odds was held as a pay-per-view event by Impact Wrestling (then known as Total Nonstop Action Wrestling) between 2005 and 2012 until TNA discontinued most of its monthly pay-per-view events in 2013 in favor of the new pre-taped One Night Only pay-per-view events.

On November 8, 2018, Impact Wrestling announced the dates and venues of its February 2019 television tapings for Impact!, with the tapings taking place between February 15 to February 17, 2019 at the Sam's Town Casino in Las Vegas, Nevada. It was later announced that Against All Odds would return as a special episode of Impact! which would feature a portion of the February 17 tapings and would air on March 29.

=== Storylines ===
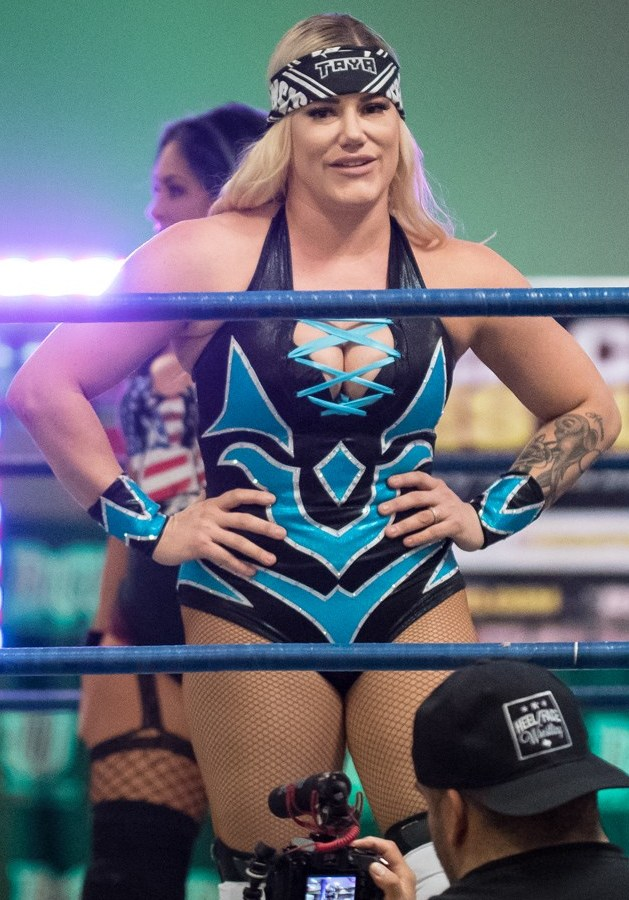
Taya Valkyrie was the defending Impact Knockouts Champion heading into Against All Odds.

At Homecoming, Johnny Impact successfully defended the Impact World Championship against Brian Cage and Killer Kross attacked Impact and Taya Valkyrie after the match which concluded with Kross powerbombing Valkyrie into the crowd. Cage continued to demand a rematch with Impact claiming that he was screwed out of the title while Kross and Moose also pursued the title, leading to a four-way match for the title at Uncaged, which Impact won to retain the title. On the March 1 episode of Impact!, Kross and Moose defeated Impact and Cage in a tag team match in which Cage was outnumbered due to Impact's injury. On the March 15 episode of Impact!, Impact was set to defend the title against Cage but Kross instead brought out a downed Impact and Cage attacked him until Valkyrie turned on Cage by low blowing him and Impact then attacked Cage to reveal that it was a set up between Impact, Kross and Valkyrie to double cross Cage. It was later announced that Cage would face Kross in a match at Against All Odds.

At Homecoming, Taya Valkyrie defeated Tessa Blanchard to win the Impact Knockouts Championship. Valkyrie successfully defended the title against Blanchard in a street fight at Uncaged. Blanchard demanded a rematch for the title and it was announced that Blanchard would face Jordynne Grace in a match to determine the #1 contender for the Knockouts Championship on the March 15 episode of Impact!, which Grace won, thus setting up a match between Grace and Valkyrie for the Knockouts Championship at Against All Odds.

On the March 8 episode of Impact!, Scarlett Bordeaux declared herself the winner of her talent search and said that Glenn Gilbertti's video was the most embarrassing, which led to Gilbertti insulting Bordeaux specifically and women's wrestling in general, claiming that women needed to stay at home and remain housewives and women's wrestling was nothing more than bra and panties matches, resulting in a confrontation between the two, leading to a match between the two at Against All Odds.

== Event ==
=== Preliminary matches ===
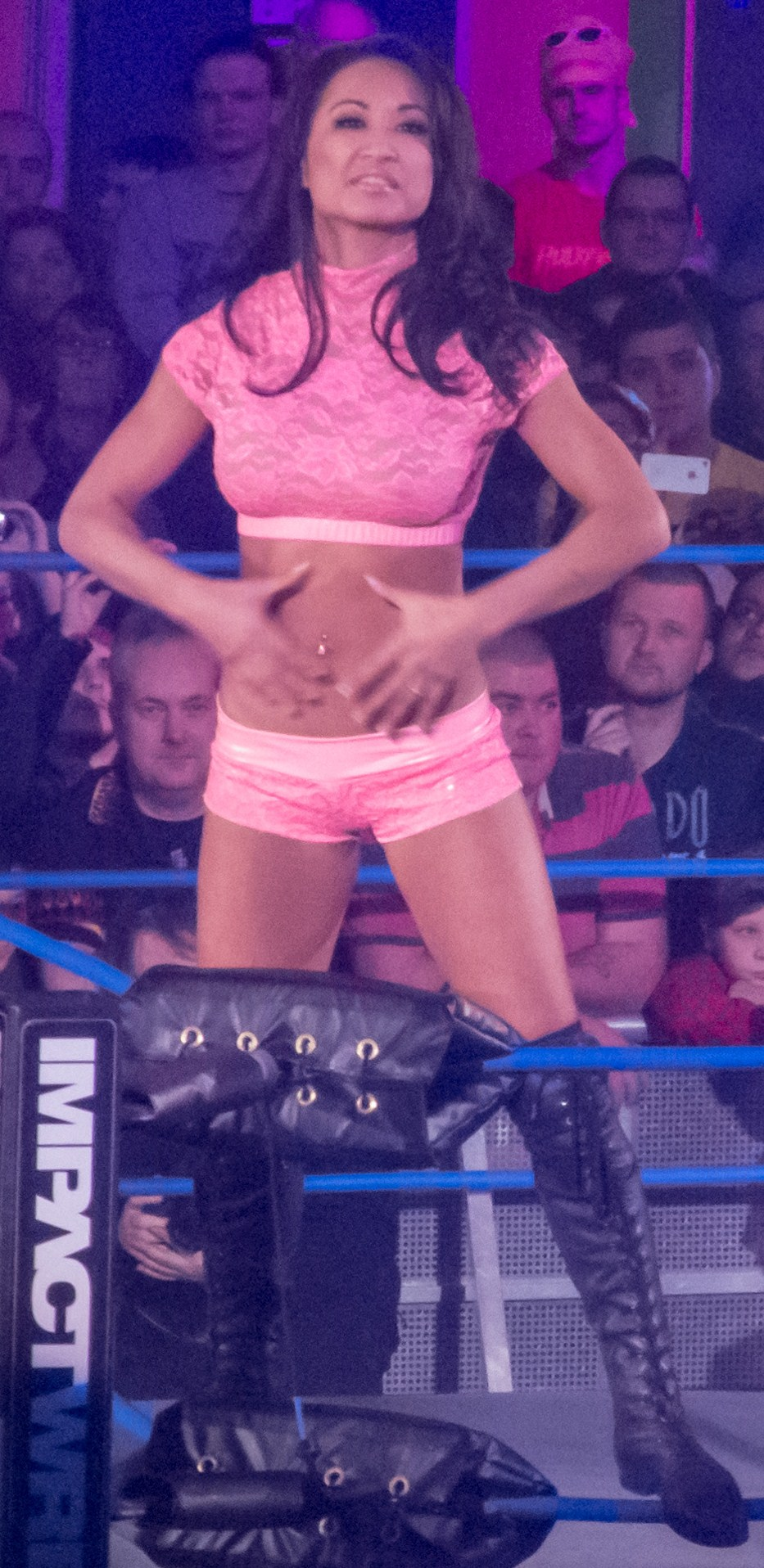
Impact Hall of Famer Gail Kim came out of retirement at Against All Odds to challenge Tessa Blanchard to a match at Rebellion.

The event kicked off with an unsanctioned brawl between The Latin American Xchange (Santana and Ortiz) and The Lucha Brothers (Pentagón Jr. and Fénix). LAX would drive both members of Lucha Brothers through the tables and then Konnan challenged Lucha Brothers to a Full Metal Mayhem match for the World Tag Team Championship at Rebellion.

Next was the opening match of the event between Glenn Gilbertti and Scarlett Bordeaux. As Gilbertti was hitting mounted punches to Bordeaux in the corner, Bordeaux countered by powerbombing him for the win.

It was followed by a confrontation between Gail Kim and Tessa Blanchard, in which Blanchard demanded apology from Kim and her resignation from Impact Wrestling and Kim said that she resigned from Impact to take on Blanchard and challenged her to a match at Rebellion, which Blanchard accepted.

Next was the penultimate match of the event, in which Taya Valkyrie defended the Knockouts Championship against Jordynne Grace. Grace avoided a moonsault by Valkyrie and attempted to nail a Grace Drive to Valkyrie but Valkyrie avoided it and then Johnny Impact checked on Valkyrie and took her backstage, thus causing her to get counted out. As a result, Grace won the match but Valkyrie retained the title.

=== Main event match ===
Brian Cage came out to confront Johnny Impact and Taya Valkyrie immediately after Valkyrie's match and tried to attack Impact until Cage's scheduled opponent Killer Kross attacked him from behind. Cage nailed a F5 to Kross to pin him but Impact put Kross' foot on the ropes. The referee was distracted, allowing Valkyrie to hit a low blow to Cage and Kross delivered two Doomsday Saitos to Cage and covered him for the pinfall but Cage kicked out and two but the referee still awarded the win to Kross and claimed that Cage's shoulders were down for the three count. Impact attacked Cage after the match.

The match was followed by a segment, in which Rosemary dragged Allie to the Undead Realm to retrieve her soul but Kiera Hogan intervened despite Rosemary's warning, which distracted Rosemary and allowed Su Yung in "killing" Allie.

== Reception ==
According to Steph Franchomme of Vulture Hound, Against All Odds "was not the best special event" but Impact "definitely moved forward" and "took the right direction", which could lead everyone "to a major and unforgettable PPV (Rebellion).

== Aftermath ==
Most of the matches and angles at Against All Odds led to the Rebellion pay-per-view event. Johnny Impact and Brian Cage continued their feud over the Impact World Championship, leading to a rematch between the two set for Rebellion. On the April 5 episode of Impact!, Jordynne Grace earned herself a rematch for the Knockouts Championship at Rebellion by defeating the returning Madison Rayne to become the #1 contender for the title. The two teams collided in a mixed tag team match on the April 12 episode of Impact!, where Impact and Valkyrie defeated Cage and Grace.

Rosemary vowed revenge on Kiera Hogan holding her responsible for Allie's "demise" and continued her feud with Su Yung over the next few weeks while continuing to berate Hogan for her actions. On the May 3 episode of Impact!, Rosemary had a match with Hogan, which ended in a disqualification after Yung and her Undead Bridemaids interfered. Yung and the Undead Bridemaids attacked Rosemary after the match and Hogan turned on Rosemary by refusing to make the save for her. Rosemary would then defeat Yung in a Demon Collar match on the May 17 episode of Impact!.

The Full Metal Mayhem match between Lucha Brothers and LAX for the World Tag Team Championship was made official for Rebellion. Gail Kim's comeback match against Tessa Blanchard was also made official for Rebellion.

== Results ==
No.	Results	Stipulations	Times
1	Scarlett Bordeaux defeated Glenn Gilbertti	Intergender match	06:30
2	Jordynne Grace defeated Taya Valkyrie (c) by countout	Singles match for the Impact Knockouts Championship	12:45
3	Killer Kross defeated Brian Cage	Singles match	15:30
(c) / – the champion(s) heading into the match
