= TNA+ =

Professional wrestling streaming service

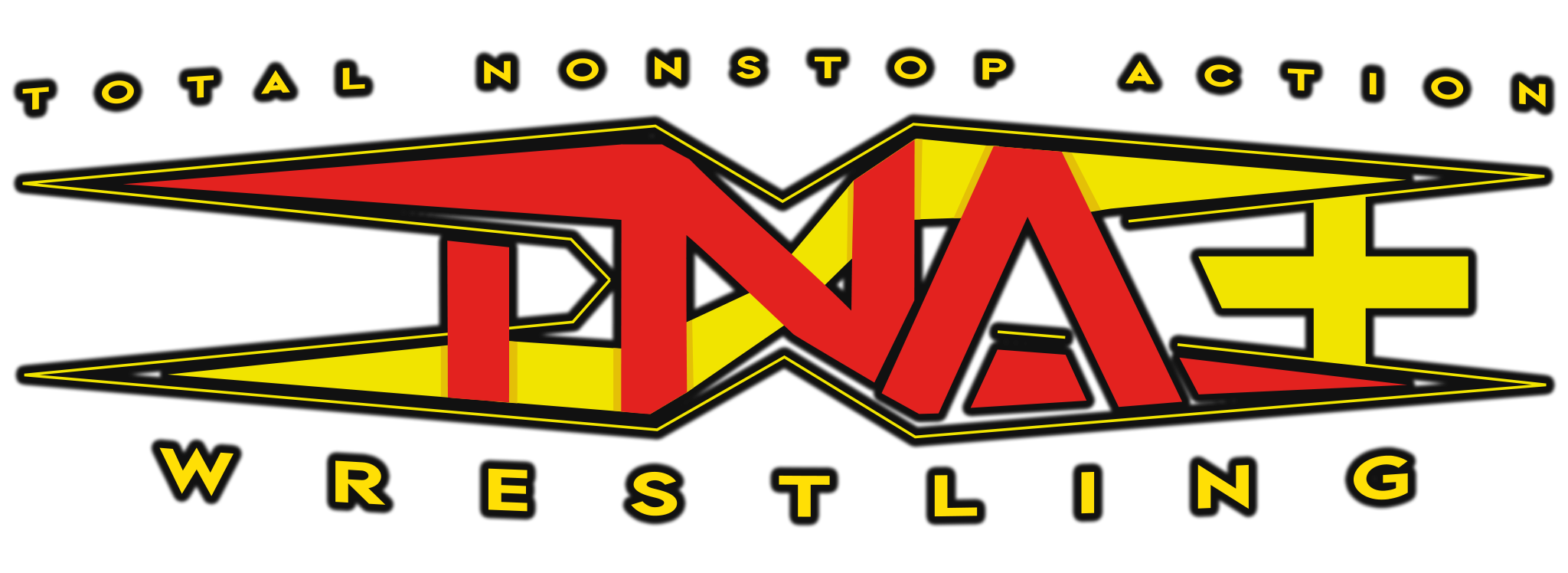
- Broadcast area: Worldwide (with exceptions)
- Headquarters: Toronto, Ontario, Canada

Programming
- Language: English
- Picture format: HDTV (1080i 16:9)

Ownership
- Owner: Anthem Sports & Entertainment
- Parent: Total Nonstop Action Wrestling

History
- Launched: May 1, 2019
- Replaced: Global Wrestling Network
- Former names: Impact Plus (2019–2023)

Links
- Website: watch.tnawrestling.com/home

TNA+ is a professional wrestling video streaming service that launched on May 1, 2019. It is owned and operated by Anthem Sports & Entertainment, the parent company of professional wrestling promotion Total Nonstop Action Wrestling (TNA).

Originally known as Impact Plus, and succeeding the previous Global Wrestling Network (GWN) service, TNA+ offers library content and exclusive live monthly premium events. Since its 2024 relaunch as TNA+, the platform has utilized the technology and ecosystem of Endeavor Streaming.

== History ==
=== Background ===
The first streaming media service to offer Total Nonstop Action Wrestling (TNA) content on-demand was the TNA Video Vault, which launched in 2009. The service changed its name to 'TNA On Demand' in 2010 and continued until its shuttering around early 2013.

The company previously operated the "TNA Wrestling Plus" YouTube channel, where users could rent pay-per-views and documentaries previously released on DVD.

In early 2017, current parent company Anthem Sports & Entertainment (which acquired and rebranded the promotion as Impact Wrestling that same year) launched "Total Access TNA" (later known as Total Access Impact) in the United Kingdom after broadcaster Challenge's contract had expired.

On October 10, 2017, the promotion launched the Global Wrestling Network (GWN). The streaming service featured 1,000 hours of content from the TNA / Impact Wrestling library, as well as content from the sibling Fight Network, Canadian promotion Border City Wrestling, and Wrestling at the Chase among others.

On August 14, 2018 Jeff Jarrett and his company, Global Force Entertainment, announced that it had filed a lawsuit against Anthem in the District Court of Tennessee for copyright infringement over the rights. Jarrett owned all properties related to Global Force Wrestling (GFW) since its creation in 2014; in-spite of GFW's brief merger with, and subsequent rebrand of, Impact Wrestling as GFW in 2017. Had the lawsuit by Jarrett been successful, Impact would need to immediately suspend the operations of GWN.

=== Launch ===
On April 28, 2019, during its Rebellion pay-per-view, Impact Wrestling announced the launch of Impact Plus, a brand new streaming service which would replace the Global Wrestling Network.

On August 30, 2019, Impact announced that an Impact Plus subscription package would be available on FITE TV.

Following the announcement of Impact Wrestling reverting back to the Total Nonstop Action (TNA) Wrestling brand, the company announced on December 7, 2023 that Impact Plus would be relaunched as TNA+, and will be distributed by Endeavor Streaming starting January 5, 2024.

== Programming ==
=== Current content ===
==== TNA/Impact Wrestling ====
- All monthly pay-per-view events
- All TNA+ Monthly Specials
- All TNA weekly pay-per-views (promoted as The Asylum Years)
- Select One Night Only events (All 2013–2015, 2017–2019; 7 of 10 2016)
- All episodes of TNA British Boot Camp
- All episodes of Impact!
- Select episodes of TNA Xplosion (All 2017-present)
- Select episodes of TNA Legends
- Select episodes of TNA Unfinished Business
- Select episodes of TNA's Greatest Matches
- Select episodes of TNA Epics
- All episodes of Inside Impact
- All Twitch specials
- All episodes of Outside the Ropes
- All episodes of Callihan Uncensored
- All episodes of Before the Impact
- All episodes of Gut Check
- All episodes of Impact! After Shock
- All episodes of TNA Reaction
- New episodes of Impact in 60
- New Classic Compilations (TNA's home video releases)
- New episodes of Hidden Gems

==== Independent wrestling ====
- Ohio Valley Wrestling events

=== Removed content ===
==== Classic wrestling ====
- Pro Wrestling Superstars
- Wrestling at the Chase

==== Independent wrestling ====
- Alpha-1 Wrestling
- AML Wrestling
- Border City Wrestling
- Capitol Wrestling
- Championship Wrestling From Arizona
- Championship Wrestling From Hollywood
- Destiny World Wrestling
- Future Stars of Wrestling
- Great White North Wrestling
- International Pro Wrestling
- Lariato Pro
- Prestige Wrestling
- Preston City Wrestling
- Rise Wrestling
- Rocky Mountain Pro
- Smash Wrestling
- Superkick'd
- Ultimate Championship Wrestling
- World Series Wrestling
- WrestleCade
- WrestlePro
