= WXw Femmes Fatales =

Femmes Fatales
- Promotions: Westside Xtreme Wrestling
- First event: 2016
- Event gimmick: Single-elimination tournament for female wrestlers

Femmes Fatales is a single-elimination tournament annually held by Westside Xtreme Wrestling (wXw) for female wrestlers. The tournament has been held every year since 2016, with the exception of 2020 and 2021, due to the COVID-19 pandemic. Beginning in 2016 as an all-female event, the tournament is used to feature some of the best female wrestlers from various countries. Following the introduction of the wXw Women's Championship in 2017, the tournament winner receives a title shot for the Women's Championship at a future date and time.

== List of winners ==
#	Year	Winner	Times won	Date	Runner-up	City	Venue	Main event	Ref.
1	2016	Alpha Female	1	October 1, 2016	Jinny, Melanie Gray and Shanna	Oberhausen, North Rhine-Westphalia, Germany	Turbinenhalle Oberhausen	Alpha Female vs. Jinny vs. Melanie Gray vs. Shanna in a four-way elimination match in the final of the 2016 Femmes Fatales	
2	2017	Toni Storm	1	October 7, 2017	Viper	Oberhausen, North Rhine-Westphalia, Germany	Turbinenhalle Oberhausen	Toni Storm vs. Viper in the final of the 2017 Femmes Fatales	
3	2018	Meiko Satomura	1	October 6, 2018	LuFisto	Oberhausen, North Rhine-Westphalia, Germany	Turbinenhalle Oberhausen	LuFisto vs. Meiko Satomura in the final of the 2018 Femmes Fatales	
4	2019	LuFisto	1	October 5, 2019	Leyla Hirsch	Oberhausen, North Rhine-Westphalia, Germany	Turbinenhalle Oberhausen	Leyla Hirsch vs. LuFisto in the final of the 2019 Femmes Fatales	
5	2022	Aliss Ink	1	October 1, 2022	Masha Slamovich	Oberhausen, North Rhine-Westphalia, Germany	Turbinenhalle Oberhausen	Aliss Ink vs. Masha Slamovich in the final of the 2022 Femmes Fatales	
6	2023	Nicole Matthews	1	September 23, 2023	Hyan	Oberhausen, North Rhine-Westphalia, Germany	Turbinenhalle Oberhausen	Hyan vs. Nicole Matthews in the final of the 2023 Femmes Fatales	
7	2024	Anita Vaughan	1	October 6, 2024	Debbie Keitel	Oberhausen, North Rhine-Westphalia, Germany	Turbinenhalle Oberhausen	Anita Vaughan vs. Debbie Keitel in the final of the 2024 Femmes Fatales	
8	2025	Safire Reed	1	September 28, 2025	Anita Vaughan	Oberhausen, North Rhine-Westphalia, Germany	Turbinenhalle Oberhausen	Anita Vaughan vs. Safire Reed in the final of the 2025 Femmes Fatales	
9	2026	Chihiro Hashimoto	1	September 27, 2026	Kanji	Oberhausen, North Rhine-Westphalia, Germany	Turbinenhalle Oberhausen	Chihiro Hashimoto vs. Kanji in the final of the 2026 Femmes Fatales	

=== Championship match for winner ===
– Championship victory
– Championship match loss

#	Winner	Event	Year	Championship match
1	Meiko Satomura	19th Anniversary	2019	Satomura lost to Amale for the wXw Women's Championship.
2	LuFisto	World Tag Team Festival	2019	LuFisto lost to Amale for the wXw Women's Championship.
3	Aliss Ink	World Tag Team Festival	2022	Ink defeated Baby Allison to win the wXw Women's Championship.
4	Nicole Matthews	World Tag Team Festival	2023	Matthews lost to Ava Everett to win the wXw Women's Championship.
5	Anita Vaughan	World Tag Team Festival	2024	Vaughan defeated Levaniel to win the wXw Shotgun Championship.
6	Chihiro Hashimoto	Pro-Wrestling Grand Prix 2026	2026	Hashimoto defeated Kanji to win the reactivated WXw Women's World Championship

== Tournament history ==
=== 2016 ===
The first Femmes Fatales event took place at the Turbinenhalle Oberhausen in Oberhausen, North Rhine-Westphalia, Germany on October 1, 2016. It was the first all-female wrestling event produced by wXw. It was a two-round tournament featuring eight female wrestlers. Four wrestlers won singles matches in the first round to qualify for a four-way elimination match in the final which Alpha Female won.

Qualifiers
Leah Vaughan	Pin
Melanie Gray	7:31
Dahlia Black	Pin
Jinny	6:36
Alexis Rose	Pin
Alpha Female	3:23
Pollyanna	Pin
Shanna	7:48

Final
Melanie Gray	–
Jinny	–
Alpha Female	Win
Shanna	7:09

=== 2017 ===
The second Femmes Fatales tournament took place at the Turbinenhalle Oberhausen in Oberhausen, North Rhine-Westphalia, Germany on October 7, 2017.

Quarterfinals
Jinny	Win
Toni Storm	7:05
Wesna
Bye
Melanie Gray	Pin
Viper	4:55
Killer Kelly	Sub
Laura Di Matteo	5:08

Semifinals
Toni Storm	Pin
Wesna	8:10
Viper	Pin
Laura Di Matteo	5:15

Finals
Toni Storm	Pin
Viper	7:48

=== 2018 ===
Quarterfinals
Meiko Satomura	Pin
Wesna	9:59
Audrey Bride	Pin
Millie McKenzie	7:16
Killer Kelly	Pin
Kris Wolf	7:09
LuFisto	Pin
Toni Storm	8:17

Semifinals
Meiko Satomura	Sub
Millie McKenzie	9:30
Killer Kelly	Pin
LuFisto	5:11

Finals
Meiko Satomura	Pin
LuFisto	11:17

=== 2019 ===
Quarterfinals
Session Moth Martina	Pin
Wesna
Leyla Hirsch	Sub
Sammii Jayne	5:36
Baby Allison	Pin
Lana Austin
LuFisto	Pin
Vivien

Semifinals
Session Moth Martina	Pin
Leyla Hirsch
Lana Austin	Sub
LuFisto

Finals
Leyla Hirsch	Pin
LuFisto	14:44

=== 2022 ===
Quarterfinals
Iva Kolasky	Pin
Killer Kelly	6:09
Aliss Ink	Pin
Nicky Foxley	3:08
Anastasia Bardot	Pin
Orsi	5:57
Ava Everett	Pin
Masha Slamovich	7:14

Semifinals
Killer Kelly	Pin
Aliss Ink	6:09
Anastasia Bardot	Pin
Masha Slamovich	3:13

Finals
Aliss Ink	Pin
Masha Slamovich	9:35

=== 2023 ===
Semifinals
Hyan	DQ
Rina Yamashita	9:03
Calypso	Sub
Nicole Matthews	7:52

Finals
Hyan	Sub
Nicole Matthews	13:07

=== 2024 ===
Semifinals
Anita Vaughan	Pin
Rhio	10:04
Debbie Keitel	Pin
Jane Nero	6:49

Finals
Anita Vaughan	Pin
Debbie Keitel	11:40

=== 2025 ===
Quarterfinals
Anita Vaughan	Pin
Emersyn Jayne	11:10
B3cca	9:16
Orsi	Pin
Leyla Hirsch	Pin
Baby Allison	6:17
Stephanie Maze	8:55
Safire Reed	Pin

Semifinals
Anita Vaughan	Pin
Orsi	9:19
Leyla Hirsch	8:19
Safire Reed	Pin

Finals
Anita Vaughan	14:16
Safire Reed	Pin

=== 2026 ===
Quarterfinals
Chihiro Hashimoto	Pin
Manami	13:07
Killer Kelly	Pin
Jane Nero	7:50
Kay Lee Ray	Pin
Stephanie Maze	8:50
Madison Marley	8:03
Kanji	Pin

Semifinals
Chihiro Hashimoto	Pin
Jane Nero	10:02
Kay Lee Ray	11:37
Kanji	Pin

Finals
Chihiro Hashimoto	Pin
Kanji	17:50
