= Aliss Ink =

Swedish professional wrestler

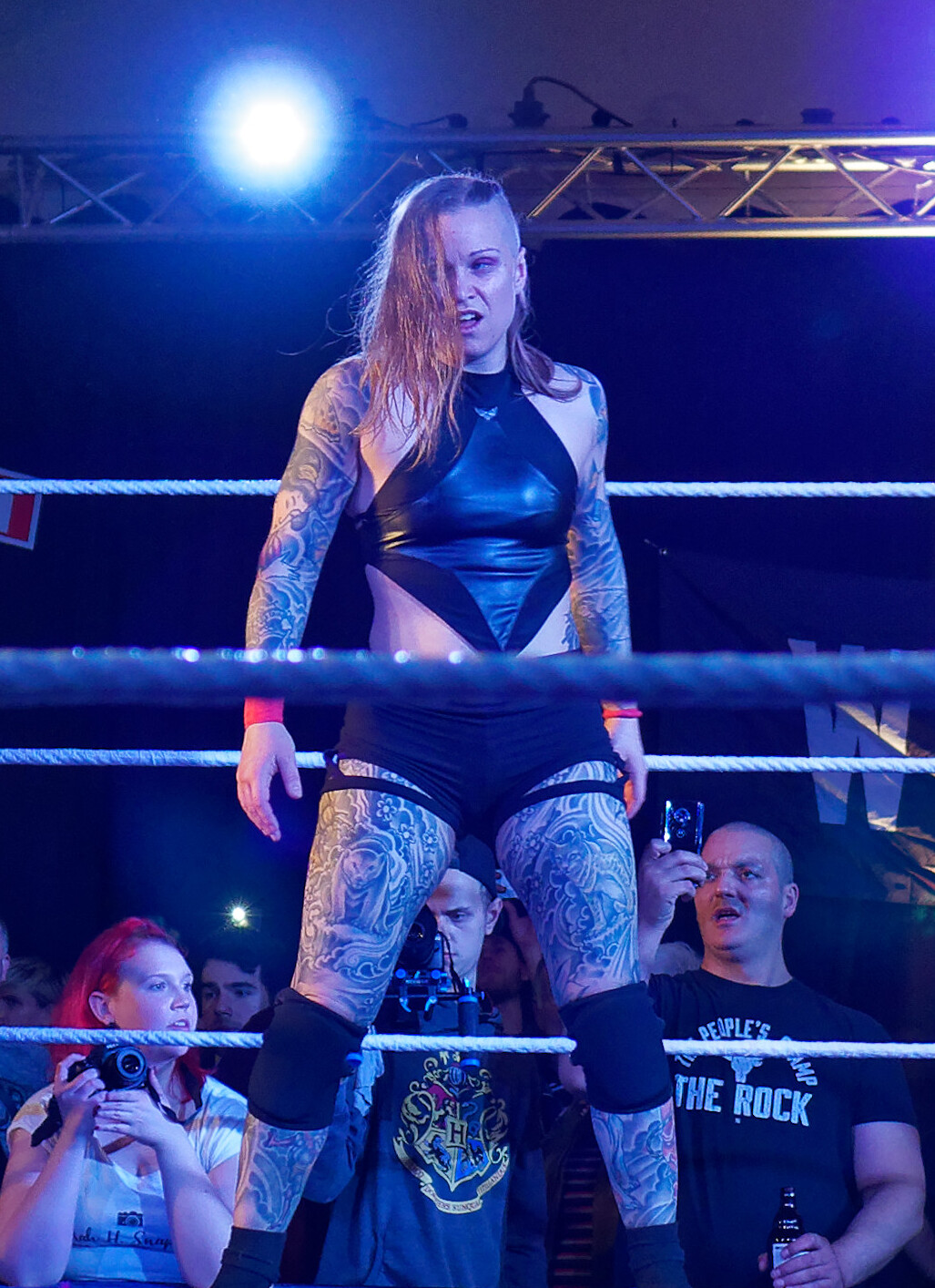
- Ink in December 2019

Personal information
- Born: Sweden

Professional wrestling career
- Ring name(s): Aliss Ink; Scandinavian Hurricane; Esk Katana; Kat Katana
- Billed height: 156 cm (5 ft 1 in)
- Billed weight: 55 kg (121 lb)
- Debut: 2018

Aliss Ink is a Swedish professional wrestler best known for her tenure with German Westside Xtreme Wrestling (wXw) and the European independent scene. She most recently worked for World Wonder Ring Stardom under the ring name of Scandinavian Hurricane.

== Professional wrestling career ==
=== European independent circuit (2018–present) ===
Ink made her professional wrestling debut under the ring name of "Esk Katana" at a house show promoted by Let's Go Wrestling on June 2, 2018, where she teamed up with Ender Kara to defeat Alexander Bäck and Marcus Of Man. She competed in various promotions from Europe such as STHLM Wrestling, Svensk Wrestling Syd, Freedom Pro Wrestling, NWF - Norsk Wrestlingforbund, NEW - Nordic Elite Wrestling, BODYSLAM! Pro Wrestling and FCF Wrestling.

=== Westside Xtreme Wrestling (2022–present) ===
Ink made her debut in Westside Xtreme Wrestling at the 2022 edition of the WXw Femmes Fatales from October 1, one-night tournament which she won by defeating Nicky Foxley in the first rounds, Killer Kelly in the semifinals and Masha Slamovich in the finals. By winning the tournament, Ink was granted the number one contendership for the wXw Women's Championship, title which she won one night later on October 2, 2022, on the second night of the WXW Tag Team Fesatival by defeating Baby Allison.

Ink competed in one of the promotion's signature events, the Shortcut To The Top in which she made her first appearance at the 2023 edition where she competed in the traditional battle royal disputed for the number one contendership for the wXw Unified World Wrestling Championship, consisting mostly of male opponents. The bout was won by Mike Schwarz and also involving various other notable opponents such as Absolute Andy, Emil Sitoci, Hektor Invictus, Jurn Simmons, Norman Harras, The Rotation and many others.

=== World Wonder Ring Stardom (2023–present) ===
Ink made her debut in World Wonder Ring Stardom as a "foreign player" under the name of Scandinavian Hurricane at Stardom Gold Rush 2023 on November 18, where she fell short to Syuri by way of TKO in an UWF Rules match. She continued to make regular appearances for the promotion as she continued competing in mixed martial art rules matches. At Stardom Nagoya Big Winter on December 2, 2023, she fell short to Nanae Takahashi in another UWF rules bout. One day later on December 3, 2023, Ink would later compete in an eight-woman tag team match in which she teamed up with God's Eye's Syuri, Mirai and Ami Sohrei to defeat Queen's Quest (AZM, Miyu Amasaki, Saya Kamitani and Utami Hayashishita). Impressed by her combat skills, Syuri offered Ink a spot into God's Eye which the latter accepted.

== Championships and accomplishments ==
- BODYSLAM! Pro Wrestling
  - BODYSLAM! Championship (1 time)
  - BODYSLAM! Women's Championship (1 time)
  - Scandi Graps Invitational (2021)
- Freedom Pro Wrestling
  - Hunger For Gold (2022)
- Pro Wrestling Illustrated
  - Ranked No. 70 of the top 250 female singles wrestlers in the PWI Women's 250 in 2023
  - Ranked No. 297 of the top 500 singles wrestlers in the PWI 500 in 2024
- STHLM Wrestling
  - Frank Andersson Nordic Wrestling Championship (1 time, current)
- Slam Wrestling Finland
  - SLAM Women's Championship (1 time, current)
- Westside Xtreme Wrestling
  - wXw Women's Championship (1 time)
  - wXw Femmes Fatales (2022)
