= Masha Slamovich =

Russian-American professional wrestler (born 1998)

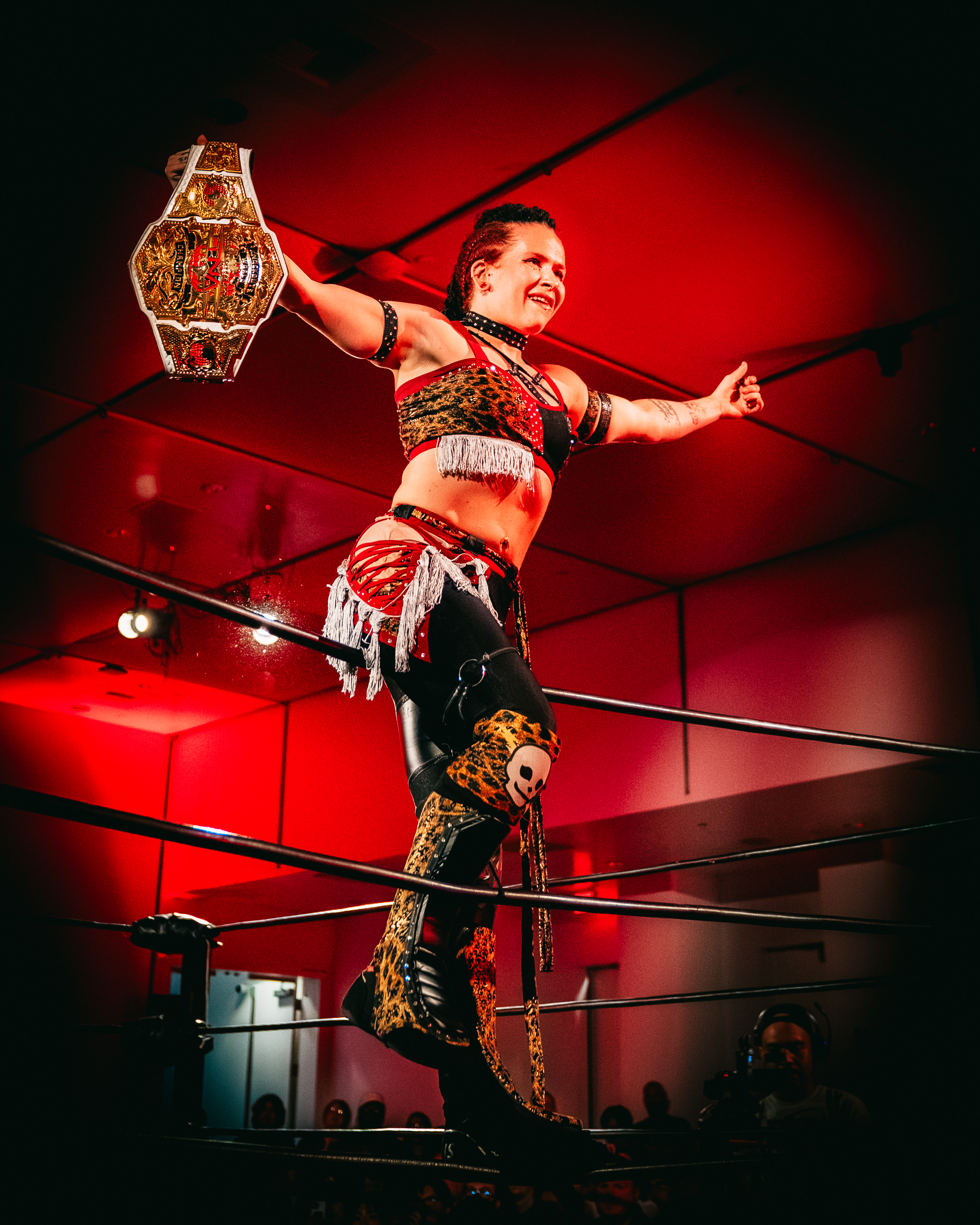
- Slamovich in 2025

Personal information
- Born: Anna Khozina; 18 June 1998 (age 28) Moscow, Russia

Professional wrestling career
- Ring names: Masha: Masha Slamovich; Skinripper
- Billed height: 5 ft 6 in (168 cm)
- Billed weight: 156 lb (71 kg)
- Billed from: Moscow, Russia
- Trained by: Amazing Red; Chigusa Nagayo; Johnny Rodz; Yusuke Kodama
- Debut: 21 May 2016

Anna Khozina (Russian: Анна Хозина; born 18 June 1998), better known by her ring name Masha Slamovich, is a Russian-American professional wrestler. She is signed to Major League Wrestling (MLW), where she performs under the mononymous name Masha and is the current MLW World Women's Featherweight Champion in her first reign, while also being a member of Contra Unit. She also performs on the independent circuit. She is best known for her time in Total Nonstop Action Wrestling (TNA), where she is a former one-time TNA Knockouts World Champion, as well as a former three-time TNA Knockouts World Tag Team Champion.

== Early life ==
Anna Khozina was born in Moscow, Russia, and has dual U.S. and Russian citizenship. She began training in professional wrestling at age 16, under Johnny Rodz. In 2021, Khozina earned a degree in criminal justice.

== Professional wrestling career ==
=== Independent circuit (2016–present) ===
In 2016, Khozina made her in-ring debut in Japan, wrestling on an independent women's professional wrestling show named Reina under the ring name Skinripper. She also appeared in other promotions such as Pro Wrestling Wave and World Woman Pro-Wrestling Diana, now under the ring name Masha Slamovich. In February 2020, she returned to Japan and trained in the Marvelous Dojo under Chigusa Nagayo. Due to the COVID-19 pandemic, Slamovich stayed in Japan and toured with Marvelous throughout the year. In 2019, Slamovich debuted for the Russian Independent Wrestling Federation (IWF), later returning to the promotion in 2022. She lost to Ivan Markov in an intergender match at IWF Strike 119, which aired on 10 February 2022.

On 3 December 2021, Slamovich made her debut for Expect The Unexpected Wrestling (ETU), being defeated by Billie Starkz. On 9 September 2022, she competed in a one night, ten wrestler tournament to crown the first ever ETU Keys To The East Champion. The tournament also included Mike Bailey, Akira, Alec Price, Gabriel Skye, Brandon Kirk, Scoot Andrews, Danny Demanto, Marcus Mathers, and Matt Tremont. Masha defeated Brandon Kirk in the first round, followed by a victory over Mike Bailey in the semi-finals. Slamovich defeated Marcus Mathers in the tournament final to be crowned the inaugural champion.

On 2 January 2023 at Game Changer Wrestling (GCW)'s 56 Nights, Slamovich defeated Cole Radrick, later that night she won a "Do or Die" battle royal match to become the No. 1 contender for the GCW World Championship. On 17 March, Slamovich defeated Nick Gage at Eye for an Eye to win the title, becoming the first woman in the company's history to do so. On 4 June, Slamovich defended the GCW World Championship against Rina Yamashita at Cage of Survival 2, but then lost it to Blake Christian when he cashed in his Brass Ring for a title shot any time he wanted, turning the match into a triple threat.

On 10 February 2024, Slamovich won the 16th annual Jersey J-Cup tournament where she defeated JCW World Champion Jordan Oliver in the finals, winning the title in the process. On 4 January 2025, at Tokyo Joshi Pro-Wrestling's Tokyo Joshi Pro '25 event, Slamovich teamed up with Zara Zakher and fought 121000000 (Maki Itoh and Miyu Yamashita) for their Princess Tag Team Championship in a losing effort.

Masha also holds the Women's title for Immortal Championship Wrestling, an Indi promotion based in New York State. She obtained the title on 12 May 2025 against Courageous Christina Marie. She successfully defended her ICW women's championship on 31 May 2025.

=== Westside Xtreme Wrestling (2022–2025) ===
Slamovich competed in Westside Xtreme Wrestling's wXw Femmes Fatales tournament, making her first appearance at the 2022 edition in which she defeated Ava Everett in the first rounds, Anastasia Bardot in the semifinals and fell short to Aliss Ink in the finals. On 11 November 2023 at Broken Rules XXI, she won the wXw women's title, defeating Ava Everett, in a last woman standing match. On 23 December at wXw 23rd Anniversary, she faced Robert Dreissker in a winner-takes-all match also disputed for the wXw Unified World Wrestling Championship. Dreissker won the bout and unified both championships, subsequently retiring the wXw Women's Championship.

=== Impact Wrestling / Total Nonstop Action Wrestling (2019–2025) ===
==== Championship pursuits (2019–2023) ====
Slamovich made her first appearance for Impact Wrestling during the 14 June 2019 episode of Impact! where she lost to Havok. She also appeared on the 29 June episode of Xplosion where she was defeated by Jordynne Grace. Slamovich made her return to Impact Wrestling on 17 September 2021, during the Knockouts Knockdown event, where she unsuccessfully challenged Deonna Purrazzo, who was the AAA Reina de Reinas Champion and Impact Knockouts World Champion at the time, in a non-title match. After impressing Impact Wrestling officials, Hall of Famer Gail Kim came out after the match in an unaired segment and offered Slamovich a contract with the promotion.

Throughout the first half of 2022, Slamovich went on an undefeated streak as she defeated various jobbers as well as contracted Knockouts such as Alisha and Havok. On the 1 September episode of Impact!, in the main event match, Slamovich defeated Deonna Purrazzo to become the No. 1 contender for the Impact Knockouts World Championship, which was held by Jordynne Grace. Slamovich challenged Grace for the title on 7 October at Bound for Glory, but was unsuccessful, thus ending her winning streak.

On 13 January 2023, at Hard To Kill, Slamovich defeated Deonna Purrazzo, Killer Kelly, and Taylor Wilde in a four-way match to become the #1 contender for the Impact Knockouts World Championship. On 24 February at No Surrender, Slamovich challenged Mickie James for the Knockouts World Championship, but was unsuccessful. At Rebellion, Slamovich fought for Team Bully and lost a 10-wrestler Hardcore War against Team Dreamer.

==== MK Ultra (2023–2024) ====
On the 11 May episode of Impact!, Slamovich pinned Killer Kelly in a match while trapped in the latter's Killer Clutch submission, though Kelly refused to release the hold afterwards. Some weeks later on 25 May and into Under Siege, the two were found to be brawling throughout the crowd, with a chain being used as a weapon by both women. On 9 June, at Against All Odds, Slamovich defeated Kelly in a dog collar match. Slamovich turned face and joined forces with Kelly on the 22 June episode of Impact!.

On 15 July, at Slammiversary, Slamovich and Kelly became known as MK Ultra, and defeated The Coven (KiLynn King and Taylor Wilde) for the Impact Knockouts World Tag Team Championship. MK Ultra made the first title defense against The Death Dollz (Courtney Rush and Jessicka), Jody Threat and KiLynn King, and SHAWntourage (Gisele Shaw and Savannah Evans) in a four-way match at Emergence. At Against All Odds, MK Ultra successfully defended the titles against SHAWntourage in their second title defense. They would hold the titles for a few months, retaining against teams like Death Dollz on the 21 September episode of Before the Impact, and Deonna Purrazzo and Tasha Steelz on the 23 October episode of Main Event Mondays. On 13 January 2024, at Hard To Kill, when they lost the titles to Havok and Rosemary, only to regained them a month later. On 8 March at Sacrifice, Slamovich and Kelly were defeated by Spitfire (Dani Luna and Jody Threat), ending their reign at 14 days. Slamovich turned on Kelly and attacked her to end MK Ultra.

==== The System and Knockouts World Champion (2024–2025) ====
In April 2024, The System tried to convince Slamovich to team up with Alisha Edwards to challenge for the TNA Knockouts World Tag Team Championship. On the Countdown to Rebellion pre-show, after Spitfire retained the titles against Decay (Havok and Rosemary), Slamovich and Edwards confronted Spitfire from the entrance ramp. On 3 May at Under Siege, Slamovich and Edwards defeated Spitfire to win the TNA Knockouts World Tag Team Championship, this marked her third reign with the title. At Victory Road, Slamovich defended the TNA Knockouts World Tag Team Championship, alongside Tasha Steelz (who took the place of Alisha Edwards due to her not being medically able to compete) against Spitfire in a losing effort. After the match, Alisha and Steelz turned on Slamovich and attacked her, thus kicking Slamovich out of The System and turning face in the process.

On 26 October at Bound for Glory, Slamovich defeated Jordynne Grace to win the TNA Knockouts World Championship for the first time. On 29 November at Turning Point, Slamovich made her first successful title defense against Grace in a two out of three falls match. On 13 December at Final Resolution, Slamovich defeated Tasha Steelz in a Falls Count Anywhere match to retain the TNA Knockouts World Championship. At Genesis on 19 January 2025, Slamovich defeated Rosemary in a Clockwork Orange House of Fun match to retain the TNA Knockouts World Championship. At Sacrifice, Slamovich defeated NXT's Cora Jade to retain the TNA Knockouts World Championship. At Rebellion, she retained her title against Tessa Blanchard. Slamovich successfully defended the TNA Knockouts World Championship against Victoria Crawford on 23 May at Under Siege and Léi Yǐng Lee on 6 June at Against All Odds.

On 20 July at Slammiversary, Slamovich dropped the Knockouts World Championship to NXT's Jacy Jayne in a Winner Takes All match in which Jayne's NXT Women's Championship was also on the line, ending her reign at 267 days. In September 2025, Slamovich was removed from television and creative plans following allegations of domestic violence against her. On 10 December, it was reported that Slamovich's TNA contract had expired and was not renewed, ending her six-year tenure with the promotion.

=== Major League Wrestling (2026–present) ===
On September 12, 2026 at MLW Fightland, Slamovich (competing under the mononym Masha), accompanied by Contra Unit's leader and manager Josef Samael, made her MLW debut and attacked Clara Carter before defeating Lady Frost; that same night, during the MLW Fusion tapings, Masha defeated Shotzi Blackheart to win the MLW World Women's Featherweight Championship.

== Personal life ==
On 23 September 2025, Sports Illustrated reported that TNA had opened an internal investigation of allegations of domestic violence by Slamovich against her former partner, independent wrestler Akira, after Akira's friend posted alleged texts and photos that showcased Slamovich verbally, physically, and emotionally abusing Akira. As a result, TNA, West Coast Pro Wrestling, Prestige Wrestling, Metroplex Wrestling and Top Talent Wrestling pulled her from their upcoming shows. Slamovich issued a statement where she apologized for her actions.

== Championships and accomplishments ==
In Game Changer Wrestling, Slamovich is a former JCW World Champion.

- AAW: Professional Wrestling Redefined
  - AAW Women's Championship (1 time)
- Combat Fights Unlimited
  - CFU Undisputed Championship (1 time)
- ESPN
  - Ranked No. 27 of the 30 best Pro Wrestlers Under 30 in 2023
- Expect The Unexpected Wrestling
  - ETU Keys To The East Championship Tournament (2022)
- Fight Life Pro Wrestling
  - Fight Life World Championship (1 time, inaugural)
- Game Changer Wrestling
  - GCW World Championship (1 time)
  - JCW World Championship (1 time)
  - Do or Die Rumble (2023)
  - Jersey J-Cup (2024, 2025)
- Global Syndicate Wrestling
  - GSW Women's World Championship (1 time, inaugural, final)
  - GSW Soul of Syndicate Championship (1 time, inaugural)
- Impact Wrestling / Total Nonstop Action Wrestling
  - TNA Knockouts World Championship (1 time)
  - TNA Knockouts World Tag Team Championship (3 times) – with Killer Kelly (2) and Alisha Edwards (1)
  - TNA Year End Awards (2 times)
    - Knockouts Tag Team of the Year (2023) with Killer Kelly
    - Match of the Year (2024) - vs. Jordynne Grace at Bound for Glory
- Lucha Memes
  - Battle of Coacalco (2022)
- Major League Wrestling
  - MLW World Women's Featherweight Championship (1 time, current)
- Pro Wrestling Illustrated
  - Ranked No. 14 of the top 150 female wrestlers in the PWI Women's 150 in 2022
  - Ranked No. 15 of the top 500 singles wrestlers in the PWI 500 in 2023
- Sports Illustrated
  - Ranked No. 10 of the top 10 wrestlers in 2022
- Victory Pro Wrestling
  - VPW Women's Championship (1 time)
- West Coast Pro Wrestling
  - West Coast Pro Women's Championship (1 time)
  - Queen of Indies (2023)
- Westside Xtreme Wrestling
  - wXw Women's Championship (1 time, final)
