= Amale (wrestler) =

Moroccan-French professional wrestler (born 1993)

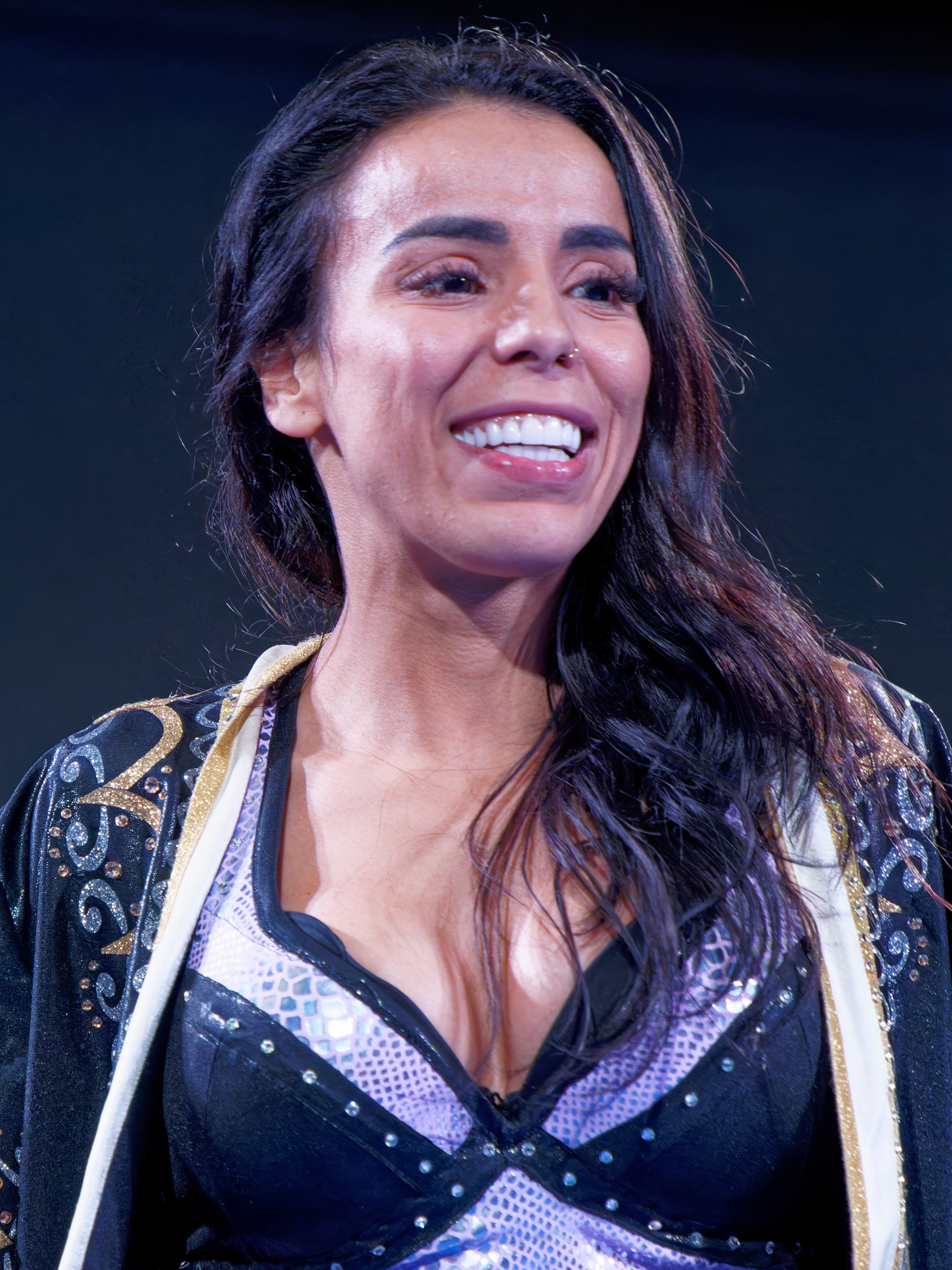
- Amale in 2023

Personal information
- Born: Amale Dib; 19 June 1993 (age 33) Béziers, France

Professional wrestling career
- Ring names: Amale; Amale Winchester
- Billed height: 5 ft 4 in (1.63 m)
- Billed from: Paris, France
- Debut: 7 January 2012

Amale Dib (born 19 June 1993) is a Moroccan-French professional wrestler. She is best known for her tenure in WWE, where she performed under the ring name Amale. She was the first French female wrestler, and third overall French national after Sylvester Lefort and Marcus Louis to be signed to WWE. She is also known for her time on the independent circuit, as well as the German-based professional wrestling promotion Westside Xtreme Wrestling (wXw), where she is a former wXw Women's Champion.

== Professional wrestling career ==
=== Independent circuit (2012–present) ===
Amale debuted on 7 January 2012 for the French-based promotion Tigers Pro Wrestling. Since then, she has wrestled for multiple independent promotions across Europe.

=== Westside Xtreme Wrestling (2019–2024) ===
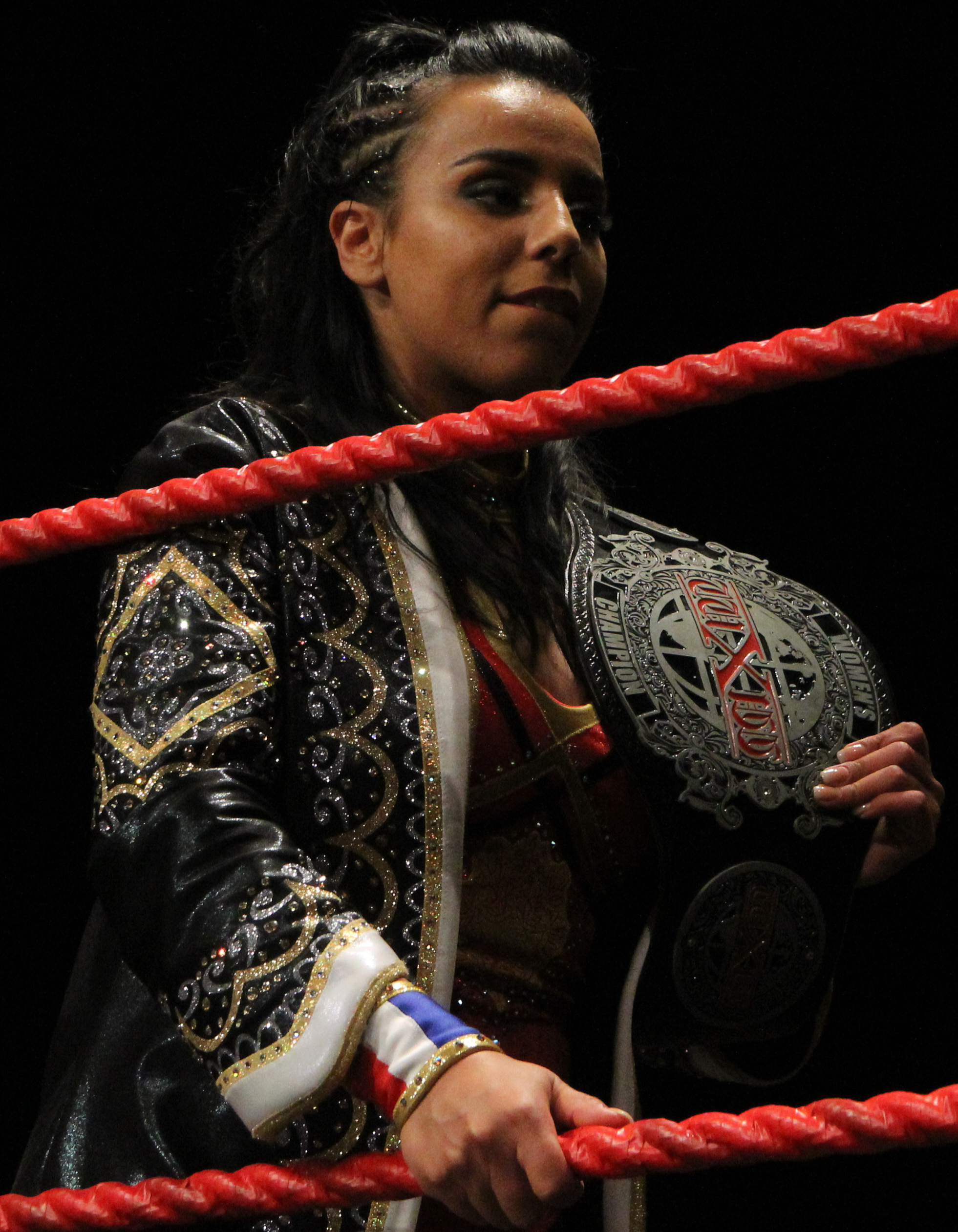
Amale is a former one-time wXw Women's Champion

Amale is a former one-time wXw Women's Champion, having won the title on 6 January 2019. She defeated Killer Kelly, Toni Storm and Valkyrie at Superstars of Wrestling to win the title.

=== WWE (2020–2022) ===
Prior to her signing with WWE, Amale wrestled on NXT UK several times, facing the likes of Aoife Valkyrie, Dani Luna, Jinny and Xia Brookside, all in losing efforts. On 13 August 2020, in a tweet, Amale announced that she had signed a contract with WWE. On 8 October 2020, she teamed with Nina Samuels against Luna and Brookside in a losing effort when Samuels abandoned Amale at ringside. Amale and Samuels argued later on that evening during Kay Lee Ray's state of union address. Two weeks later, she was defeated by Samuels. In May 2021, Amale would start a short feud with Xia Brookside by attacking her on the May 6 episode of NXT UK costing her opportunity to compete in a gauntlet match to determine the next #1 contender for the NXT UK Women's championship, establishing herself as a heel. Amale would defeat Brookside two weeks later on the May 20 episode of NXT UK. Amale started a feud with NXT UK women's champion Meiko Satomura, where she accused Satomura of stealing her spot in the gauntlet match. She confronted Satomura after attacking Nina Samuels. Satomura accepted Amale's challenge. The next week she defeated Samuels. On the July 15 episode of NXT UK, Amale would unsuccessfully challenge Meiko Satomura for the NXT UK Women's Championship. After weeks of being off, she returned on the 15 September episode of NXT UK, where she defeated Myla Grace. She lost to Emillia McKenzie the following week.

Amale turned face in December after explaining her journey to WWE in a video. Upon her return in January, she started a feud with Jinny as she did not believe in her "French Hope". This resulted in a match between the two on the January 27 episode of NXT UK, with Jinny picking up the victory. Amale rekindled her rivalry with a heel Xia Brookside by defeating her on the February 24 episode of NXT UK but lost to her on the March 31 episode due to interference from Brookside's new bodyguard, Eliza Alexander. After helping Angel Hayze from an attack by Xia Brookside and Eliza Alexander, she teamed with Hayze in a losing effort to Brookside and Alexander during NXT UK's 200th episode. Two weeks later she was defeated by Eliza Alexander. She defeated Stevie Turner on the 16 july episode of NXT UK. She defeated Nina Samuels the following week. She lost to Blair Davenport on an episode of NXT UK. She once again defeated Samuels. She took part in a fatal four way elimination match to determine the 1 contender to the NXT UK women's championship where she eliminated Isla Dawn, and was eliminated by Eliza Alexander.

On 18 August 2022, Amale was released from her WWE contract.

== Personal life ==
Dib is of Moroccan descent. She worked as a school teacher while competing on the independent circuit, teaching during the week and wrestling on the weekends. She left her teaching job after signing with WWE.

On September 3, 2024, Dib released a statement on X, accusing fellow French wrestler and former romantic partner Clément Petiot (better known as Tristan Archer) of "physical, psychological and emotional abuse", as well as cheating, threatening Dib's family, racist remarks due to her Moroccan heritage, misogynistic remarks, stalking, and threats to blackball her from the wrestling scene entirely in France after her WWE release in 2022. She detailed the assault that Petiot gave against a female friend of hers, and stated that, in partiality to the incident, that Petiot displays "violent behavior towards [her], other women, [her] colleagues and fans". Petiot allegedly asked her to not go forward with making the allegations public, which coincided with the previous peaks of the Speaking Out movement in 2020. Amale stated that, due to an incident regarding her and Petiot at unnamed wrestling events in Europe, that Petiot had to be cut from any WWE coverage, including him participating in some events, including Backlash France. Due to the psychological pressure put on her by Petiot, Dib stated that she had grown into an eating disorder, with her losing 45 kilograms during and after the relationship at various points. After the allegations came about from Dib, Petiot was taken off programmes in France that month and abroad, as well as wXw relieving him of his duties.

== Championships and accomplishments ==
- European Catch Tour Association
  - ECTA Women's Championship (1 time)
- Pro Wrestling Illustrated
  - Ranked No. 51 of the top 100 female singles wrestlers in the PWI Women's 100 in 2020
- Westside Xtreme Wrestling
  - wXw Women's Championship (1 time)
- WrestlingKULT
  - Women of KULT Championship (2 times)
