= Jinny (wrestler) =

British retired professional wrestler (born 1989)

Personal information
- Born: Jinny Sandhu; 28 September 1987 (age 38) London, England
- Education: Birmingham City University (BSc)
- Spouse: Walter Hahn (m. 2022)
- Children: 1

Professional wrestling career
- Ring name(s): Jinny; Jinny Couture
- Billed height: 5 ft 6 in (168 cm)
- Billed weight: 136 lb (62 kg)
- Billed from: Knightsbridge, England
- Trained by: The Projo; Jimmy Havoc
- Debut: 4 January 2015
- Retired: 14 January 2023

Jinny Hahn (née Sandhu; born 28 September 1987) is an English retired professional wrestler.

She is best known for her time in Progress Wrestling (PROGRESS) and WWE, where she performed on the NXT UK brand. She also wrestled for multiple British wrestling promotions, such as Revolution Pro Wrestling (RevPro/RPW), Pro-Wrestling: EVE (EVE), and Westside Xtreme Wrestling (WxW).

== Early life ==
Jinny Sandhu was born in London on 28 September 1987, and grew up in London's Knightsbridge district. Sandhu first started watching wrestling when she was nine years old and was influenced by Jushin Liger, Lita, Ted DiBiase, Sherri Martel, Victoria, and Trish Stratus. She earned a BSc in psychology from Birmingham City University in 2012.

== Professional wrestling career ==
=== Progress Wrestling (2015–2020) ===
Sandhú was trained by Progress Wrestling (Progress) and was the first female graduate of Progress's Projo wrestling school. In January 2015, now worked under the ring name Jinny, she had her first singles match at Progress Endvr:8, defeating Pollyanna. At Endvr:12, Jinny defeated Toni Storm. At Endvr:15, Jinny defeated Leva Bates. At Chapter 28, Jinny defeated Storm in a re-match. At Chapter 34, Jinny and Marty Scurll defeated Laura Di Matteo and Mark Haskins. At Chapter 36, Jinny, Alex Windsor and Dahlia Black defeated Pollyanna, Nixon Newell and Di Matteo. In August 2017, Jinny and Deonna Purrazzo defeated Black and Dakota Kai. At Chapter 66, Jinny and Mercedes Martinez defeated Storm and Shazza McKenzie. Jinny and Austin Theory defeated Kay Lee Ray and Will Ospreay at Chapter 67. At Chapter 69, Jinny defeated Storm to win the Progress Wrestling World Women's Championship for the first time. Jinny successfully defended the championship against Kai. On 30 December, she lost the title to Jordynne Grace, ending her reign at 224 days and with 6 title defenses.

=== Revolution Pro Wrestling (2016–2018) ===
Jinny, now worked under the ring name Jinny Couture made her Revolution Pro Wrestling (RevPro) debut in June 2016, defeating Addy Starr.

In 2017, she defeated Veda Scott. Jinny won the RevPro British Women's Championship after defeating Purrazzo in At The Cockpit 25, making her the inaugural champion. She successfully defended the title against Millie McKenzie and Bea Priestley.

Jinny lost the title to Jamie Hayter in 2018, ending her reign at 147 days and with 1 title defense.

=== Westside Xtreme Wrestling (2016–2017) ===
In 2016, Jinny debuted for German wrestling promotion, Westside Xtreme Wrestling (wXw) and defeating Black. Later that same night, she was defeated by Alpha Female in a Fatal 4-Way match that also included Shanna and Melanie Gray.

In 2017, Jinny defeated Thunder Rosa.

=== WWE (2017–2023) ===
==== Early appearances (2017–2018) ====
In April 2017, Jinny took part in WWE's WrestleMania 33 Axxess, where she was defeated by Toni Storm on two consecutive days.

A little over a year later, in June 2018, it was announced that WWE had signed her to a contract. Around that time, Jinny was announced as one of the four women who would compete in a Fatal 4-Way match to determine the number one contender for the NXT Women's Championship on Day 1 of United Kingdom Championship Tournament. At the event, Jinny was injured during the match, forcing her out of it and the match was later reverted to a triple threat match between Storm, Killer Kelly and Isla Dawn.

In July, Jinny took part of the 2018 Mae Young Classic, where she was defeated in the first round by her rival Storm.

==== NXT UK (2018–2022) ====
Shortly after her participation in the Mae Young Classic, Jinny was announced as part of the women's roster in the newly created NXT UK brand. After a series of vignettes promoting her debut, Jinny made her television debut on the 7 November episode, where she attacked Dakota Kai from behind after she lost a match against Toni Storm. Jinny would then enter a tournament for the inaugural NXT UK Women's Championship, where she would defeat Millie McKenzie in the first round, only to be eliminated from the tournament by Storm in the semi–finals.

On the 15 May 2019 episode of NXT UK, Jinny alongside the debuting Jazzy Gabert interrupting a match between Killer Kelly and Xia Brookside, attacking the two in the process and taking on Gabert as her enforcer. On the 19 June episode of NXT UK, Jinny, as well as other women, competed in a battle royal to determine who will get a future opportunity for the NXT UK Women's Championship. In the match, Jinny got eliminated by Brookside. On 17 July episode of NXT UK, Jinny defeated Brookside, thanks to Gabert's interference. Following this, Jinny and Jazzy went on to feud with Rhea Ripley and Piper Niven, where they ultimately came out on the losing side of things in various tag and singles matches. Jinny defeated Amale on the 19 December episode of NXT UK, where after the match, Jazzy refused to continue to beat down Amale, which led to the two parting ways as they went into 2020.

On 2 April 2020, Jinny teamed with Kay Lee Ray in a successful effort against Niven and Dani Luna. On 24 September 2020, Jinny made her return to NXT UK television, staring at Ray after her successful title defense against Niven. The following week, Jinny made her return to the ring by defeating Brookside and claiming she would be even more ruthless than ever before. On 5 November 2020, Jinny defeated newcomer Aleah James in a fairly fast squash match. After the match, Jinny called out Niven, claiming that she lacked killer instinct and the determination to be champion. During a Falls Count Anywhere championship match between Ray and Niven on 19 November 2020, she first attacked Niven at ringside, costing her the match and allowing Ray to retain. On 26 November 2020, Jinny defeated Isla Dawn, and after the match, she mocked Niven, saying that she hoped she was watching from the hospital.

Tensions continued to boil between Jinny and Niven, and eventually a match between the pair was announced on the first episode of NXT UK in 2021, where the winner would be the next to challenge Ray for the championship. On 7 January 2021, Jinny successfully defeated Niven after interference from Joseph Conners, whom Jinny seemed to have aligned herself with. Two weeks later, on the 21 January episode of NXT UK, Jinny was defeated by Ray, who retained her championship despite interference from Conners. Following this, Jinny and Conners would continue to feud with Niven, who gained an unlikely ally in Jack Starz. On the 11 March episode of NXT UK, Jinny and Conners were defeated by Niven and Starz in a mixed tag team match. Conners eventually defeated Starz in a singles match, thus ending the feud between the two teams. Jinny would then begin to feud with Aoife Valkyrie, saying that Valkyrie avoided her since her arrival in NXT UK. On 22 July episode of NXT UK, Jinny would appear on Noam Dar's Supernova Sessions, where she vowed to end Valkyrie, and later that evening, Valkyrie handed Jinny a feather to signal that she accepted her challenge. On the 29 July episode of NXT UK, Jinny defeated Valkyrie following a distraction from Conners. It was then announced that Jinny would face Valkyrie again, but this time it would be in a no disqualification match where Conners was locked in a cage; Jinny failed to win that match. The following week, Jinny claimed that although she lost the match, she won the war. On 16 September episode of NXT UK, Jinny found that Dawn had invaded her dressing room. The following week, Jinny defeated Dawn.

She defeated Amale on the 27 January 2022 episode of NXT UK, which would be her final wrestling match.

=== Retirement ===
On 14 January 2023, after a year of inactivity, Sandhú confirmed her retirement from wrestling due to an injury that was later revealed to be a concussion.

== Other media ==
Sandhú had an uncredited role in an episode of the third season of the British crime drama series DCI Banks.

From 2021 to 2022, Sandhú and Trent Seven co-hosted the show WWE The Run-In.

== Personal life ==
Sandhu met Austrian wrestler Walter Hahn, better known as Gunther, when they wrestled on the independent circuit; they began dating while in NXT UK, and married in a private ceremony in 2022. They held a second ceremony with family and friends in Sandhu's native London in April 2023. Their son was born on 27 December 2023. In 2025, they purchased a home in Cambridge.

== Filmography ==
=== Television ===
Year	Title	Role	Notes
2018	DCI Banks	—	Uncredited role (season 3)
2021–2022	WWE The Run-In	Herself	Co-host

== Championships and accomplishments ==
- Pro Wrestling Chaos
  - Maiden of Chaos Championship (1 time)
- Pro Wrestling Illustrated
  - Ranked No. 103 of the top 100 female wrestlers in the PWI Female 100 in 2021
- Progress Wrestling
  - Progress Women's Championship (2 times)
- Revolution Pro Wrestling
  - RevPro British Women's Championship (1 time)
  - RevPro British Women's Title Tournament (2018)
- South Coast Wrestling
  - South Coast Queen of The Ring Championship (1 time)
