= Turbinenhalle Oberhausen =

Cultural venue in Oberhausen, Germany

Turbinenhalle
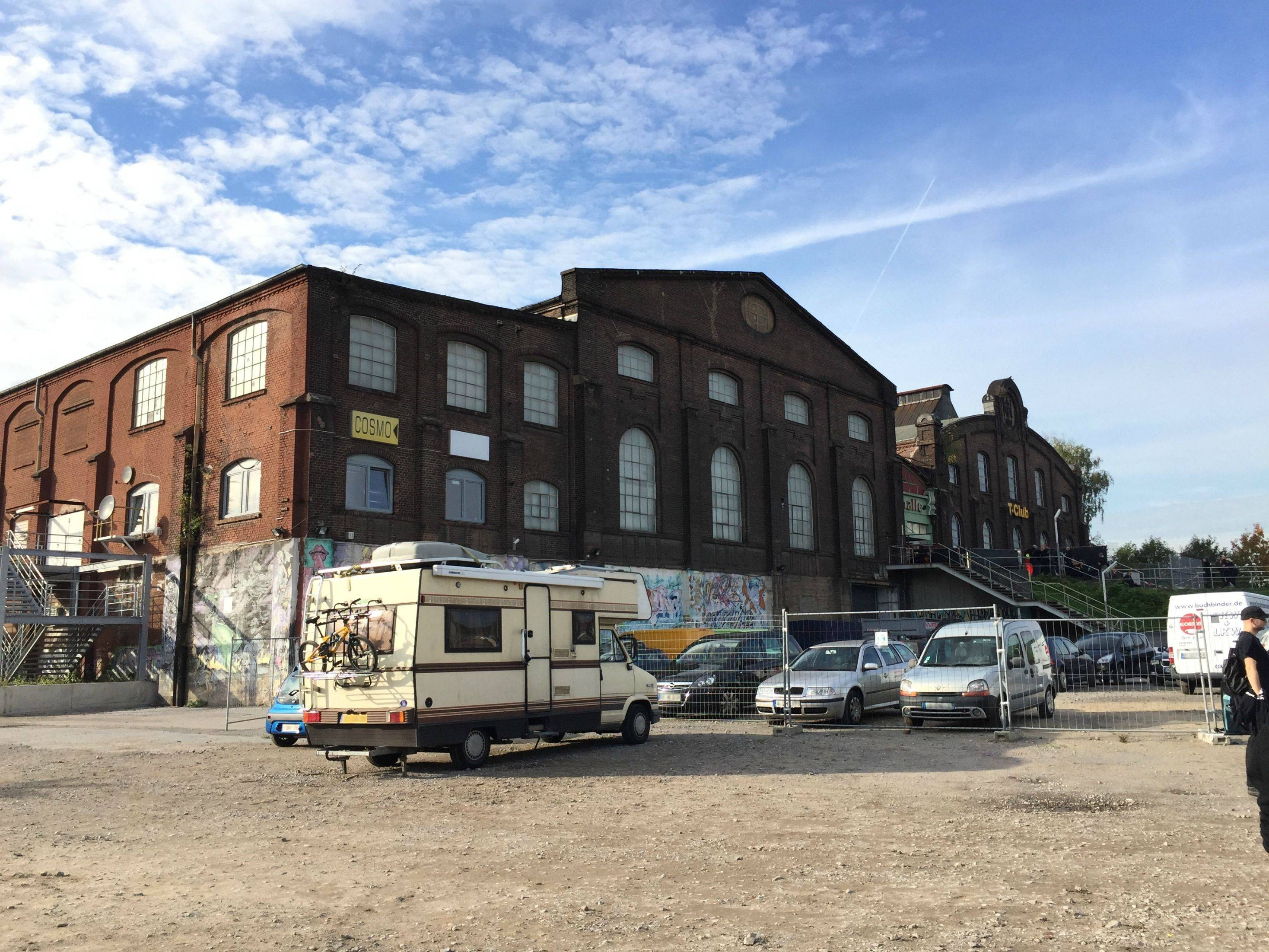
- Eastern entrance of the Turbinenhalle complex (2014)
- Interactive map of Turbinenhalle
- Coordinates: 51.4836°N 6.86695°E
- Capacity: 3,500 (Turbinenhalle 1); 1,800 (Turbinenhalle 2)

Construction
- Built: 1909
- Opened: 1993

Website
- turbinenhalle.de

The Turbinenhalle is a music and cultural venue on Mülheimerstraße in Oberhausen, North Rhine-Westphalia, Germany.

The complex opened in 1909 to generate power to the Gutehoffnungshütte coal and steel engineering company which was based in Oberhausen until 1986.

After a number of years derelict, the building was reopened as a disco in 1993 and has since evolved into one of the largest venues in the surrounding area. The complex consists of numerous rooms of varying sizes. The largest room is Turbinenhalle 1 with a capacity of approximately 3,500 - followed by Turbinenhalle 2 which fits approximately 1,800. There are also three nightclubs on site - T-Club, Steffy and COSMO.

The Turbinenhalle is situated on the Duisburg–Dortmund railway and is a stop on the Ruhrpott Industrial Heritage Trail.

== Events and Acts ==
Several international and domestic acts have performed at the Turbinenhalle including:

- Alligatoah
- Amon Amarth
- Body Count (band)
- Bullet for My Valentine
- Bushido
- Caliban
- Children of Bodom
- Der W
- Eisbrecher
- Exodus
- Flogging Molly
- Floor Jansen
- Frank Turner
- Frei.Wild
- Hammerfall
- Heaven Shall Burn
- Helloween
- In Flames
- J.B.O.
- Joe Satriani
- Judas Priest
- K.I.Z
- Kehlani
- Kevin Russell
- Korn
- Kreator
- Lacrimosa
- Motörhead
- Nazareth
- Overkill (band)
- Pantera
- Parkway Drive
- Peter Frampton
- Powerwolf
- Rammstein
- Riverside
- Rob Zombie
- Running Wild (band)
- Sabaton
- Saxon (band)
- Ska-P
- Slayer
- Sodom (band)
- Status Quo
- Testament (band)
- The Black Dahlia Murder
- Trivium
- Tyga
- Unheilig
- Uriah Heep
- W.A.S.P. (band)

The Turbinenhalle is also a regular venue for Gelsenkirchen-based professional wrestling promotion Westside Xtreme Wrestling.
