= WWP World Ladies Championship =

Professional wrestling women's championship

Details
- Promotion: World Wrestling Professionals
- Date established: November 2005
- Current champion(s): Shanna
- Date won: 18 July 2015
Statistics
- First champion(s): Scorn

The WWP World Ladies Championship is a women's professional wrestling championship in the South African professional wrestling promotion World Wrestling Professionals, contested exclusively among female wrestlers of any weight. It was created in November 2005 to coincide with WWP Thunderstrike's second season.

== Title history ==
Wrestlers:	Times:	Date:	Location:
Scorn	1	November 2005	Johannesburg, South Africa
Venus	1	November 2006	Johannesburg, South Africa
Alison Wilder	1	November 2007	Johannesburg, South Africa
Akilah	1	December 2007	Johannesburg, South Africa
Pippa La Vinn	1	16 January 2008	Johannesburg, South Africa
Akilah	2	8 February 2008	Johannesburg, South Africa
Scorn	2	14 March 2009	Johannesburg, South Africa
Akilah	3	19 July 2009	Johannesburg, South Africa
Vacant			
Shanna	1	18 July 2015	Port Elizabeth, South Africa
Black Widow	1	7 May 2017	

== See also ==
- World Wrestling Professionals
