= WXw Women's World Championship =

Title owned by German wrestling promotion Westside Xtreme Wrestling (wXw)

wXw Women's World Championship
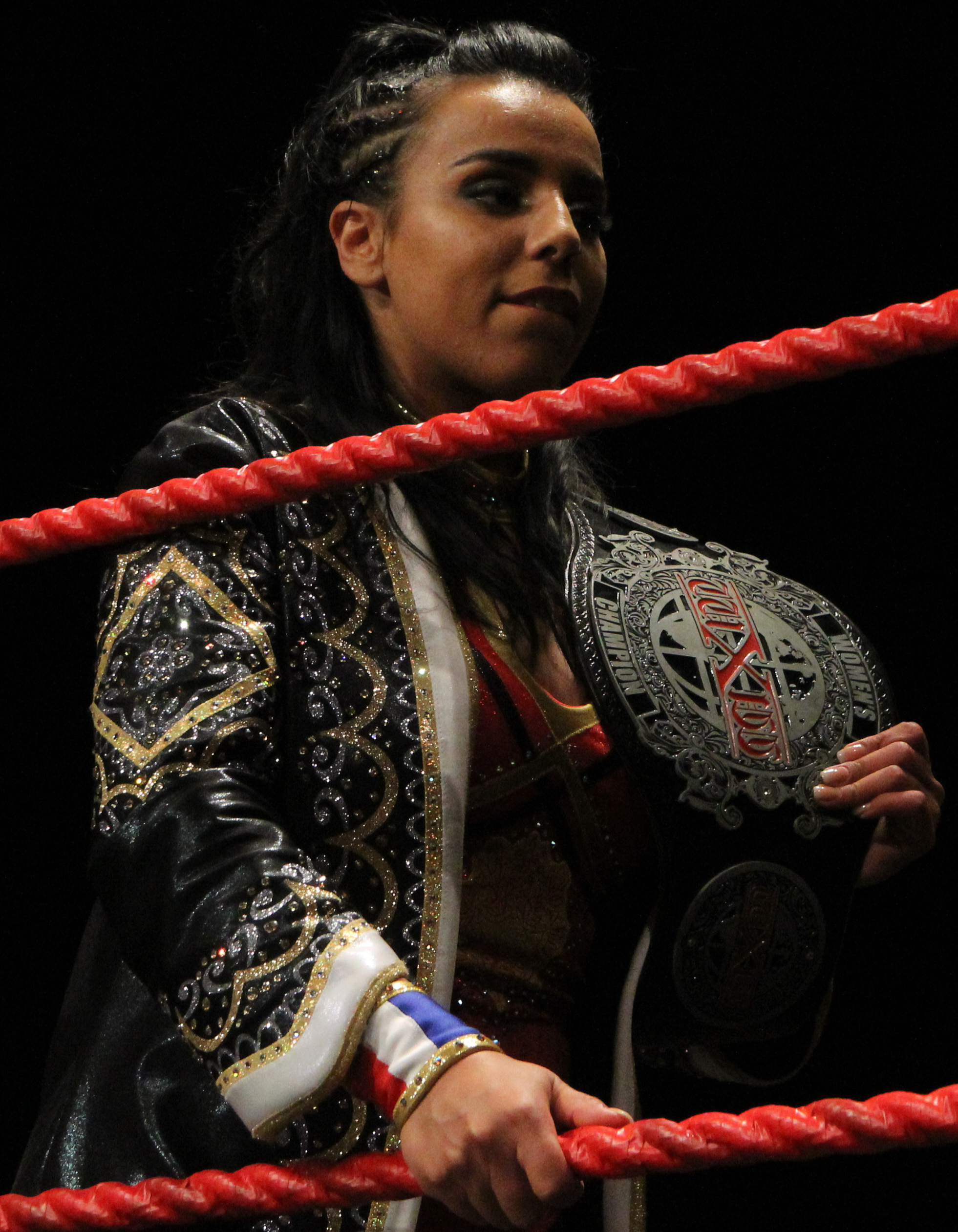
- Amale with the wXw Women's Championship belt in 2020

Details
- Promotion: Westside Xtreme Wrestling
- Date established: August 25, 2017
- Current champion: Chihiro Hashimoto
- Date won: September 27, 2026

Other names
- wXw Women's Championship (2016–2023)
Statistics
- First champion: Killer Kelly
- Final champion: Masha Slamovich
- Most reigns: Ava Everett (3 reigns)
- Longest reign: Amale (847 days)
- Shortest reign: Killer Kelly and Ava Everett (28 days)
- Youngest champion: Chihiro Hashimoto (34 years, 2 months and 26 days)
- Heaviest champion: Chihiro Hashimoto (194 lbs)
- Lightest champion: Baby Allison (119 lbs)

The wXw Women's World Championship is a women's professional wrestling championship created and promoted by the German wrestling promotion Westside Xtreme Wrestling (wXw). The first champion was crowned on December 23, 2017. Killer Kelly defeated Melanie Gray in the finals of a tournament to become the inaugural champion.

== Title history ==
There have been a total of thirteen reigns shared between ten different champions and two vacancies. Killer Kelly was the inaugural champion. Toni Storm, Ava Everett and Baby Allison have the most reigns at two. Amale's reign is the longest at 847 days, while Ava Everett's and Killer Kelly's reigns are the shortest at 28 days. The last champion was Masha Slamovich. At wXw 23rd Anniversary on December 23, 2023, she faced Robert Dreissker in a winner-takes-all match also disputed for the wXw Unified World Wrestling Championship. Dreissker won the bout and unified both championships, subsequently retiring the wXw Women's Championship.

The title was revived during the 2026 edition of the wXw Femmes Fatales tournament. Chihiro Hashimoto defeated Kanji in the finals to win the reintroduced title.

Key
No.	Overall reign number
Reign	Reign number for the specific champion
Days	Number of days held
+	Current reign is changing daily

No.	Champion	Championship change			Reign statistics		Notes	Ref.
No.	Champion	Date	Event	Location	Reign	Days	Notes	Ref.
1	Killer Kelly	December 23, 2017	17th Anniversary	Oberhausen, Germany	1	28	Defeated Melanie Gray in a tournament final to become the inaugural champion.	
2	Toni Storm	January 20, 2018	Back To The Roots XVII	Oberhausen, Germany	1	221		
—	Vacated	August 29, 2018	—	—	—	—	Vacated due to Storm suffering an injury.	
3	Melanie Gray	September 1, 2018	Fans Appreciation Night	Oberhausen, Germany	1	77	Defeated Alpha Female and Killer Kelly in a three-way match for the vacant title.	
4	Toni Storm	November 17, 2018	Broken Rules	Dresden, Germany	2	196		
5	Amale	June 1, 2019	Superstars of Wrestling	Oberhausen, Germany	1	847	This was a four-way match, also involving Killer Kelly and Valkyrie.	
—	Vacated	September 25, 2021	—	—	—	—	Vacated due to Amale being unable to defend the title because of travel restrictions during the COVID-19 pandemic as well as her WWE commitments.	
6	Iva Kolasky	October 23, 2021	True Colors	Dresden, Germany	1	133	Defeated Stephanie Maze in a best of three series match score 2-1 to win the vacant title.	
7	Ava Everett	March 5, 2022	16 Carat Gold	Oberhausen, Germany	1	28		
8	Baby Allison	April 2, 2022	We Love Wrestling - 16 Carat Gold Revenge	Frankfurt, Germany	1	183	This was a three-way match, also involving Iva Kolasky.	
9	Aliss Ink	October 2, 2022	World Tag Team Festival	Oberhausen, Nordrhein-Westfalen	1	160		
10	Baby Allison	March 11, 2023	16 Carat Gold	Oberhausen, Nordrhein-Westfalen	2	42	This was a four-way match, also involving Ava Everett and Iva Kolasky.	
11	Ava Everett	April 22, 2023	wXw True Colors 2023	Dresden, Germany	2	77		
12	Delmi Exo	July 8, 2023	Never Say Never 2023	Philadelphia, Pennsylvania	1	48	This was a Winner Takes All match in which Exo's MLW World Women's Featherweight Championship was also on the line.	
13	Ava Everett	August 25, 2023	We Love Wrestling	Hamburg, Germany	3	78		
14	Masha Slamovich	November 11, 2023	Broken Rules XXI	Frankfurt, Germany	1	43	This was a last woman standing match.	
—	Unified	December 24, 2023	wXw 23rd Anniversary	Oberhausen, Nordrhein-Westfalen	—	—	The title was unified with the wXw Unified World Wrestling Championship after Robert Dreissker defeated Masha Slamovich in a winner-takes-all match.	
15	Chihiro Hashimoto	September 27, 2026	Pro-Wrestling Grand Prix 2026	Oberhausen, Germany	1	38+	Defeated Kanji in the finals of the 2026 wXw Femmes Fatales tournament to win the reactivated championship.	

== Combined reigns ==
As of November 4, 2026.

†	Indicates the current champion

Rank	Champion	No. of reigns	Combined days
1	Amale	1	847
2	Toni Storm	2	417
3	Baby Allison	2	225
4	Ava Everett	3	183
5	Aliss Ink	1	160
6	Iva Kolasky	1	133
7	Melanie Gray	1	77
8	Delmi Exo	1	48
9	Masha Slamovich	1	43
10	Chihiro Hashimoto †	1	38+
11	Killer Kelly	1	28

== See also ==
- wXw Unified World Wrestling Championship
- wXw Shotgun Championship
- wXw World Tag Team Championship
