= Ava Everett =

American professional wrestler

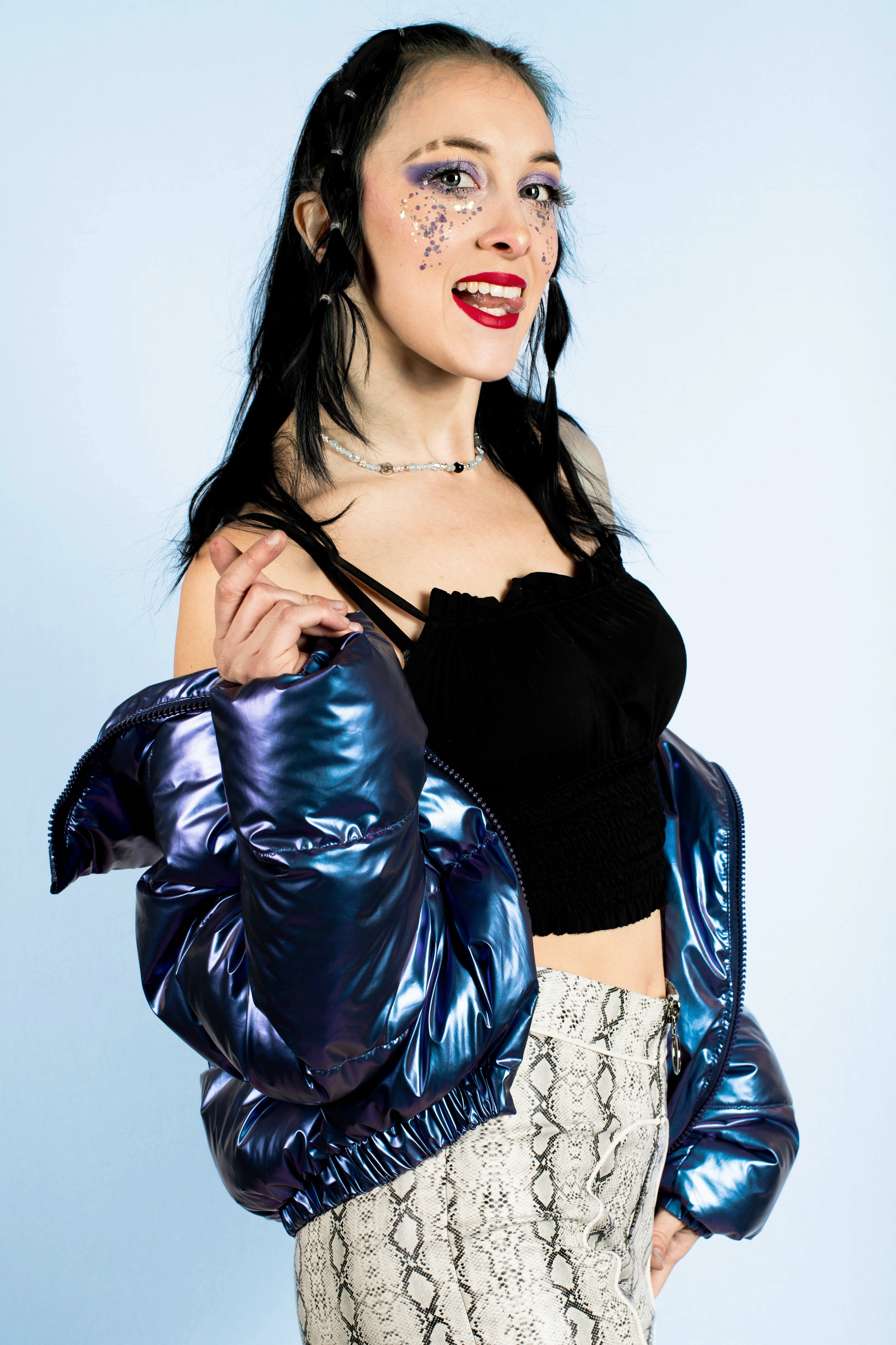
- Everett in 2023

Personal information
- Born: January 12, 1995 (age 31) Gardner, Massachusetts

Professional wrestling career
- Ring names: Ava Everett; Gretchen Frohn
- Billed height: 5 ft 8 in (173 cm)
- Billed weight: 130 lb (59 kg)
- Trained by: Anthony Greene; Brian Fury
- Debut: September 1, 2018

Evie Rodgerson (born January 12, 1995), known by her ring name Ava Everett, is an American professional wrestler. She currently competes as a freelancer in Europe and North America, and is best known for her work with Westside Xtreme Wrestling, where she has held the wXw Women's Championship a record three times.

== Professional wrestling career ==
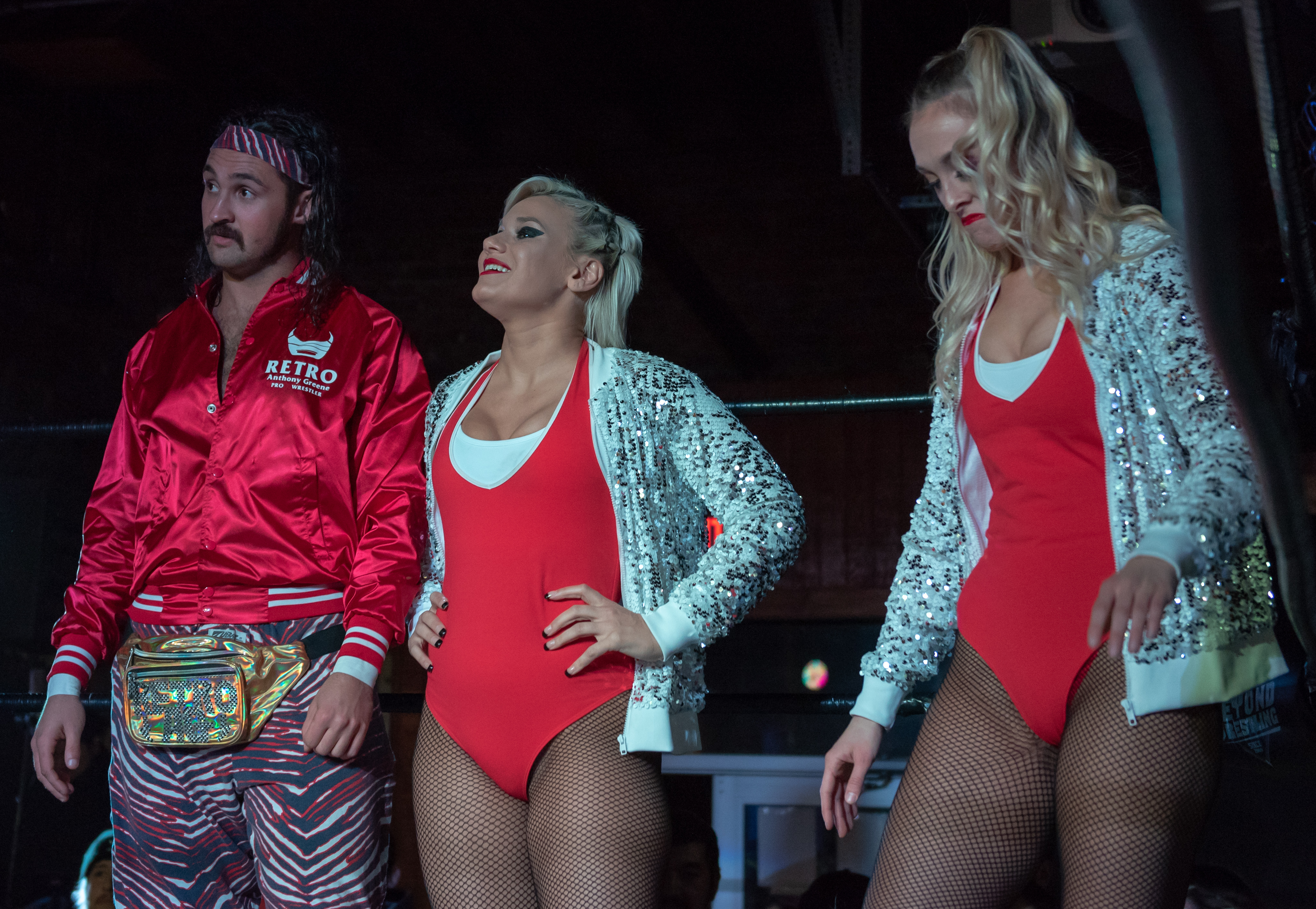
Left to Right: Anthony Greene, Angel Sinclar and Ava Everett in 2019. The trio performed as one act for a number of years.

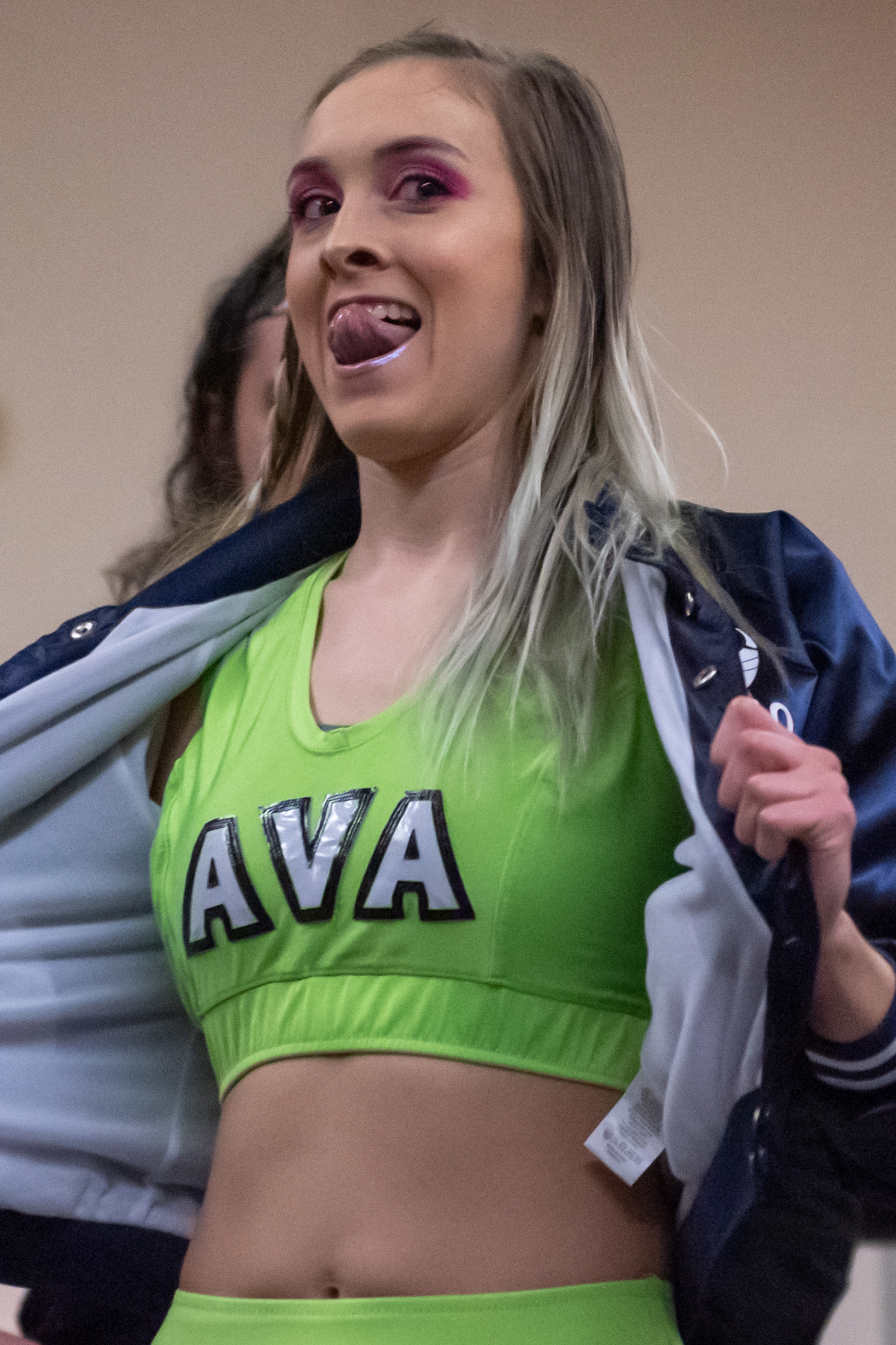
Everett in 2019

Everett began her career as a part of a three-person act; she tag-teamed with Angel Sinclair as the "Platinum Hunnies" who both served as valets to "RetroAG" Anthony Greene in North-Eastern American promotions such as Beyond Wrestling, Women Superstars United and Combat Zone Wrestling.

On March 13, 2020, Everett defeated Tasha Steelz to win the Chaotic Wrestling Women's Championship. On March 5, 2022, at 16 Carat Gold, Everett won the wXw Women's Championship for first time by defeating Iva Kolasky.

On April 22, 2023, Everett defeated Baby Allison to win the wXw women's title for the second time. On June 20, Everett called out MLW World Women's Featherweight Champion Delmi Exo to a title vs. title match in the future. Two days later, MLW announced on their website that Exo and Everett would face off at Never Say Never, with both titles on the line. On that event, Everett lost the wXw Women's title to Exo. She regained the title for a record third time on August 25, at We Love Wrestling 48. On September 23, at wXw Femmes Fatales 2023, Everett won the GWF Women's World Championship by defeating Devlyn Macabre in a Winner Takes All match. On November 11, at Broken Rules XXI, she lost the wXw women's title to Masha Slamovich, in a last woman standing match.

== Championships and accomplishments ==
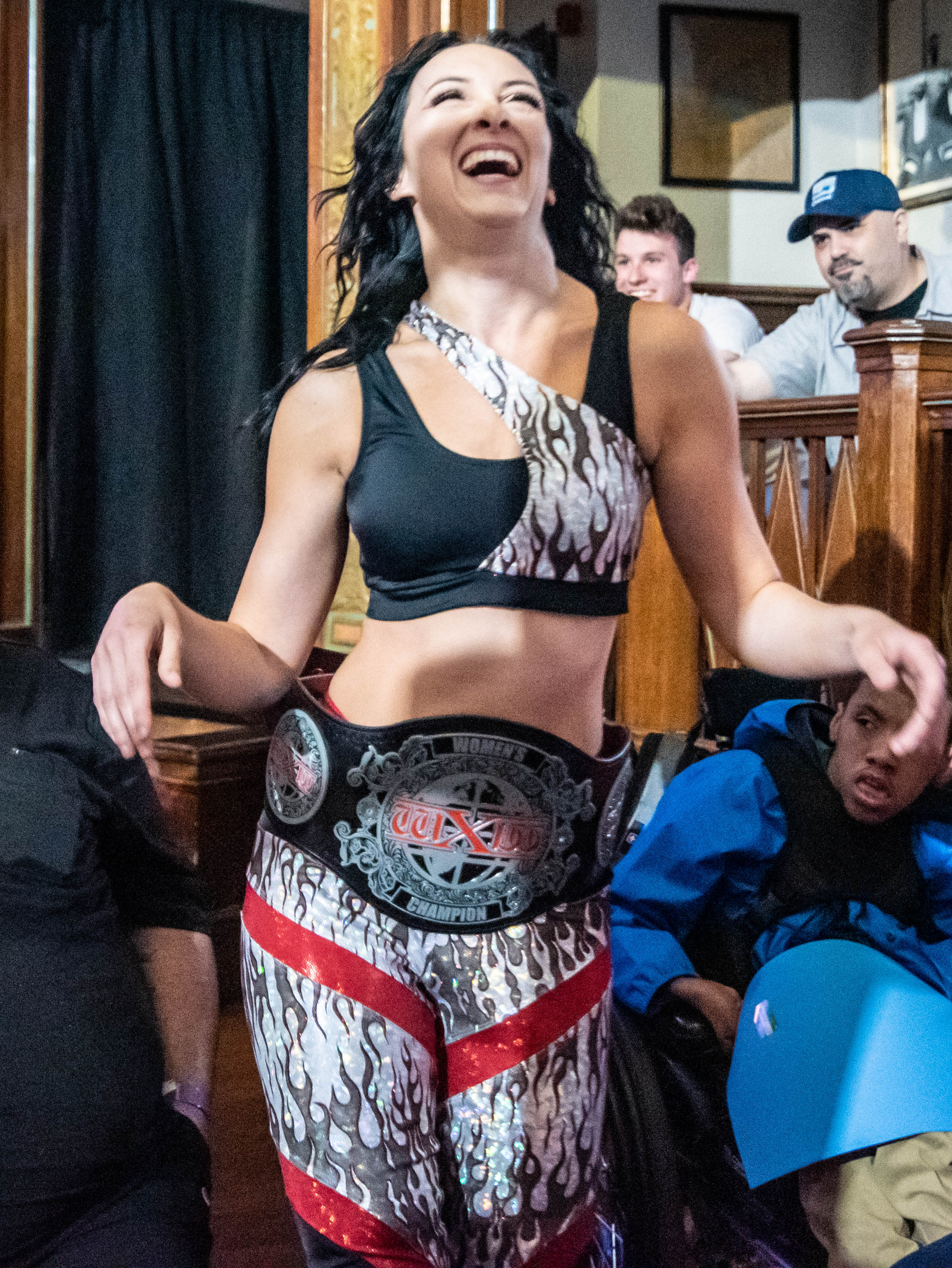
Everett as the wXw Women's Champion in 2023

- Chaotic Wrestling
  - Chaotic Wrestling Women's Championship (1 time)
- Empower Wrestling
  - Empower Tag Team Championship (1 time) – with Angel Sinclair
- German Wrestling Federation
  - GWF Women's World Championship (1 time)
- Northeast Championship Wrestling
  - NCW Women's Championship (1 time)
- Pro Wrestling Holland
  - PWH Women's Championship (1 time, current)
- Pro Wrestling Illustrated
  - Ranked No. 66 of the top 250 female singles wrestlers in the PWI Women's 250 in 2023
- Westside Xtreme Wrestling
  - wXw Women's Championship (3 times)
- Women Superstars Uncensored
  - WSU Tag Team Championship (1 time) – with Angel Sinclair
