= Iva Kolasky =

Hungarian professional wrestler

Personal information
- Born: October 26 Békéscsaba, Hungary

Professional wrestling career
- Ring names: Emese; Iva Kolasky
- Billed height: 5 ft 3 in (160 cm)
- Billed weight: 121 lb (55 kg)
- Trained by: Dover; Icarus
- Debut: August 24, 2019

Emese Kolarovszki (born October 26), known by the ring name Iva Kolasky, is a Hungarian professional wrestler. She currently competes as a freelancer in Europe, most notably German Wrestling Federation (GWF) and Westside Xtreme Wrestling (wXw). In wXw, she is a one-time wXw Women's Champion.

== Professional wrestling career ==
Kolasky made her wXw debut on June 11, 2021, defeating Taryn Gates. On October 23, 2021, at True Colors, Kolasky defeated Stephanie Maze in a best of three series match score 2–1 to win the vacant women's title. On March 5, 2022, at 16 Carat Gold, she lost the title to Ava Everett, the latter in whom won the title for first time. On April 2, Kolasky competed in a three-way match involving Everett and Baby Allison for the women's title, in which Allison would win the match.

== Championships and accomplishments ==
- Attack! Pro Wrestling
  - Attack! 24/7 Championship (1 time)
- Pro Wrestling Illustrated
  - Ranked No. 131 of the top 150 female singles wrestlers in the PWI Women's 150 in 2022
- Westside Xtreme Wrestling
  - wXw Women's Championship (1 time)
