= Xia Brookside =

English professional wrestler (born 1998)

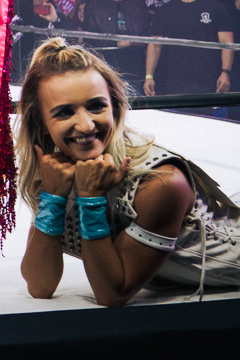
- Brookside in 2024

Personal information
- Born: Xia-Louise Brooks; 16 October 1998 (age 28) Leicester, England
- Parent: Robbie Brookside (father)

Professional wrestling career
- Ring name(s): Xia Brookside; Xia
- Billed height: 160 cm (5 ft 3 in)
- Billed weight: 50 kg (110 lb)
- Billed from: Liverpool, England
- Trained by: Robbie Brookside; Dean Allmark; Robbie Dynamite
- Debut: 2 August 2015

Xia-Louise Brooks (born 16 October 1998) is an English professional wrestler, better known by the ring name Xia Brookside. She is signed to Total Nonstop Action Wrestling (TNA), where she performs under the mononym Xia and is a member of The Righteous stable alongside Vincent and Dutch. She is a former TNA Knockouts World Champion. She previously worked for World Wonder Ring Stardom, where she was a member of Club Venus, and WWE, where she performed on the NXT UK brand.

== Early life ==
Xia-Louise Brooks was born in Leicester on 16 October 1998, the daughter of fellow professional wrestler Robbie Brookside.

== Professional wrestling career ==
=== Independent circuit (2014–2017) ===
Brooks was trained byDean Allmark and Robbie Dynamite. Under the ring name Xia Brookside, she made her in-ring debut for All Star Wrestling in her father's native Liverpool on 2 August 2015, teaming with El Ligero to defeat Kay Lee Ray and Sammy D. In February 2016, she lost a three-way match for the ICW Women's Championship against Kay Lee Ray and Carmel Jacob. In May 2016, she took part in the Empress Pro Invitational, defeating Toni Storm in the semi-finals and Kay Lee Ray in the tournament finals. On 26 June 2016, Brookside defeated Toni Storm to become Pro Wrestling Ulster Women's champion. In 2017, at a Kamikaze Pro event, she was defeated by Rosemary.

In 2016, Brookside made her Revolution Pro Wrestling debut losing to Jinny Couture. In 2017, she began working for the Japanese World Wonder Ring Stardom promotion. She made her debut teaming with Mari Apache and Gabby Ortiz to defeat Hiromi Mimura, Konami and Starlight Kid. In her second Stardom match, Brookside and Ortiz defeated Natsuko Tora and Kaori Yoneyama of Team Jungle. During the 2017 5STAR Grand Prix she gained two points by defeating Kris Wolf in the first set of block B matches.

=== WWE (2018–2022, 2025–2026) ===
On 30 July 2018, it was announced that Brookside would be taking part in the second WWE Mae Young Classic in August. She lost to Io Shirai in the first round. Despite her loss, she became a part of the NXT UK roster. She participated in a tournament to become the inaugural NXT UK Women's Champion but was eliminated in the first round. On the 15 May episode of NXT UK, her match with Killer Kelly ended in a no contest after Jinny introduced Jazzy Gabert sparking a feud between Jinny and Brookside.

On the 19 June episode of NXT UK, Brookside along with other women competed in a battle royal to determine who will get a future opportunity for the NXT UK Women's Championship. In the match, Brookside eliminated Jinny and Jazzy Gabert but she was the last one eliminated by Kay Lee Ray. On the 17 July episode of NXT UK, Brookside faced Jinny but she lost due to interference from Gabert. The following week, Brookside, Piper Niven and NXT UK Women's Champion Toni Storm were defeated by Jinny, Gabert, and Ray. On the 7 August episode of NXT UK, Brookside and Niven got defeated by Jinny and Gabert after Niven left midway into the match to attack Rhea Ripley, ending Brookside's feud with Jinny. Brookside's first appearance of 2020 came in the form of a victory over Amale on the 2 April episode of NXT UK.

Brookside returned to television on 1 October 2020, where she was defeated by Jinny. The following week, Brookside teamed with Dani Luna where they defeated Amale and Nina Samuels. On 12 November 2020, she defeated Samuels once again.

On the 2 December 2021 episode of NXT UK, Brookside failed to win the NXT UK Women's Championship from Meiko Satomura. Over the past few months, Brookside would slowly start to turn heel. Her heel turn would be cemented after she defeated Amale on the 31 March episode due to interference from her new bodyguard, Eliza Alexander. On 18 August 2022, Xia was one of the several NXT UK talents released from their contracts with the announcement of NXT UK going into hiatus and the upcoming launch of the new brand NXT Europe.

She returned to WWE in match against Candice LaRae in a tournament for the WWE Speed Women's Championship in a losing effort on 2 September episode of NXT in TNA's partnership with WWE. On 7 October (which aired on tape delay on 14 October), Xia competed in a battle royal to determine the number one contender to Jacy Jayne's NXT Women's Championship at Halloween Havoc, being eliminated by Kali Armstrong.

On the 6 October 2026 episode of NXT, Xia appeared as a surprise entrant in the 20-woman Battle Royale to determine the number 1 contender for the NXT Women's Championship at Halloween Havoc, being eliminated by her TNA rival Indi Hartwell.

=== Return to Stardom (2022–2024) ===
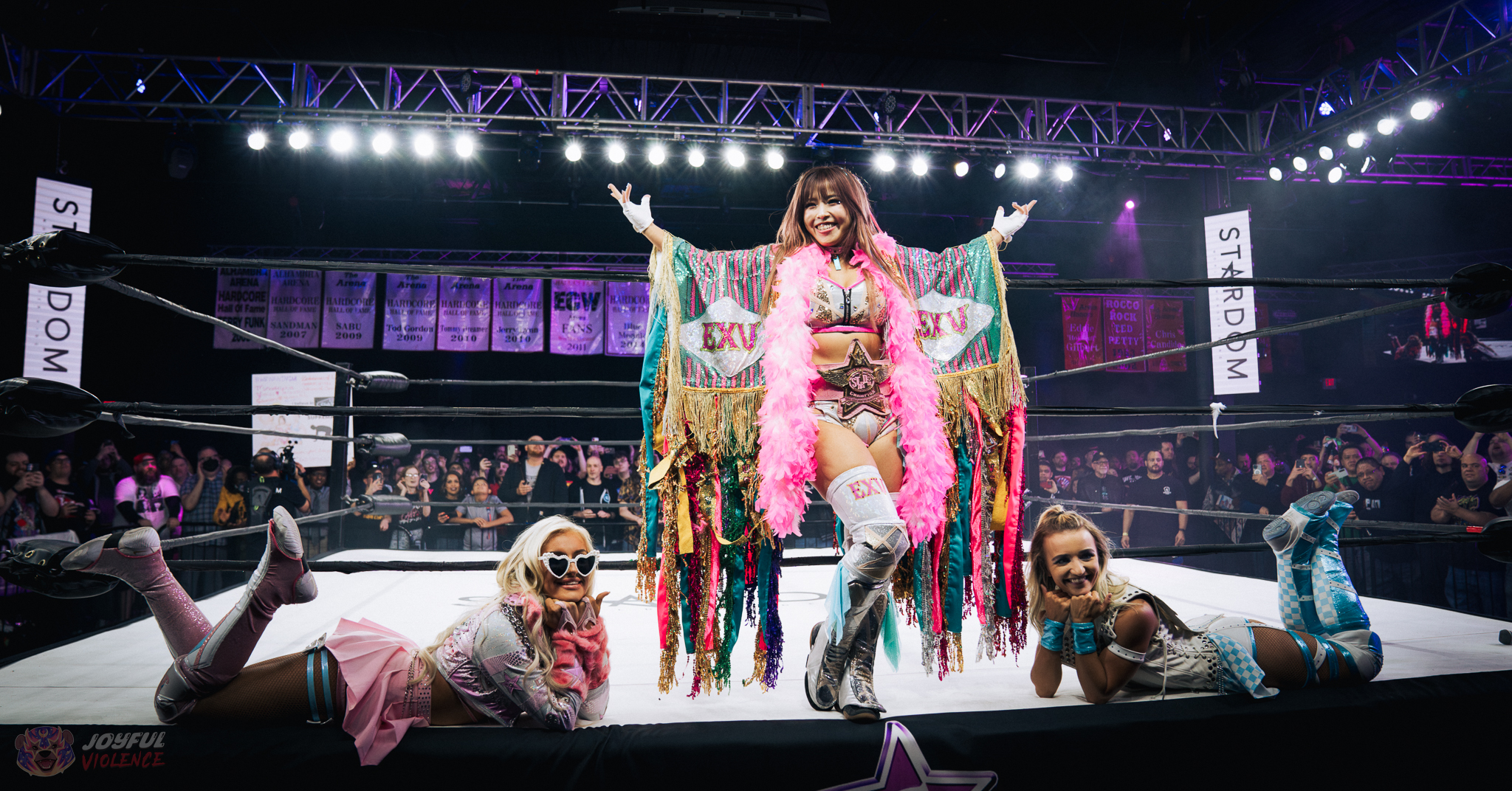
Brookside (right) with Mariah May and Mina Shirakawa in April 2024

On 29 December 2022, Brookside would make her return to Stardom alongside a debuting Mariah May at Stardom Dream Queendom 2, accompanying a returning Mina Shirakawa for her tag match with Unagi Sayaka against Donna Del Mondo members Thekla and Mai Sakurai; after the match, the three would form a trio called Club Venus. Brookside returned to England after wrestling her final Stardom match on 29 January 2023, subsequently leaving Club Venus exactly one month after it was formed. At Stardom American Dream 2024, Brookside and May returned to Stardom for one night only, reuniting with Shirakawa as Club Venus in a losing effort against Mayu Iwatani, Momo Kohgo, and Tam Nakano.

=== Total Nonstop Action Wrestling (2024–present) ===
On 2 January 2024, Brookside was revealed by Total Nonstop Action Wrestling (TNA) as one of the competitors in its Knockouts Ultimate X Match at Hard to Kill, making her TNA debut. After the match, she officially joined the company. On the 18 January episode of TNA Impact!, she would make her Impact debut in a winning effort against Tasha Steelz. On 15 August 2025 at Emergence, Brookside teamed with Léi Yǐng Lee in a four-way tag team match for the TNA Knockouts World Tag Team Championship, which was won by The Elegance Brand (Heather by Elegance and M by Elegance). The following month, Brookside and Lee began teaming as The Angel Warriors. On 5 December at Final Resolution, Brookside fought her Angel Warriors tag team partner Lee for the TNA Knockouts World Championship in a losing effort.

On 11 April 2026 at Rebellion, Brookside betrayed Léi Yǐng Lee, allowing Arianna Grace to retain the TNA Knockouts World Championship, turning heel. At Slammiversary, Brookside defeated Lee to win the TNA Knockouts World Championship. On the 9 July episode of TNA Impact!, Brookside retained the title against Lee in a No Disqualification match. At Lockdown, Brookside defeated Elayna Black in a Steel Cage match to retain the title. At Bound for Glory, Brookside lost the title to Indi Hartwell, ending her reign at 105 days. On the 22 October episode of TNA Impact!, Brookside failed to regain the title in a rematch against Hartwell. Two weeks later, Brookside became the newest member of The Righteous after attacking Harley Hudson, joining Dutch and Vincent in the process.

== Championships and accomplishments ==
- Bullpen Professional Wrestling
  - Bullpen Wrestling Women's Championship (1 time, current)
- Empress Pro Wrestling
  - Empress Pro Invitational (2016)
- International Pro Wrestling: United Kingdom
  - IPW:UK Women's Championship (1 time)
- Pro Wrestling Illustrated
  - Ranked No. 91 of the top 100 female wrestlers in the PWI Female 100 in 2019
- Pro Wrestling Ulster
  - PWU Women's Championship (1 time)
- Rise Wrestling
  - Up-and-Coming talent of the Year (2018)
- Southside Wrestling Entertainment
  - SWE Tag Team Championship (1 time) – with Sean Kustom
- Total Nonstop Action Wrestling
  - TNA Knockouts World Championship (1 time)
