= Killer Kelly =

Portuguese professional wrestler

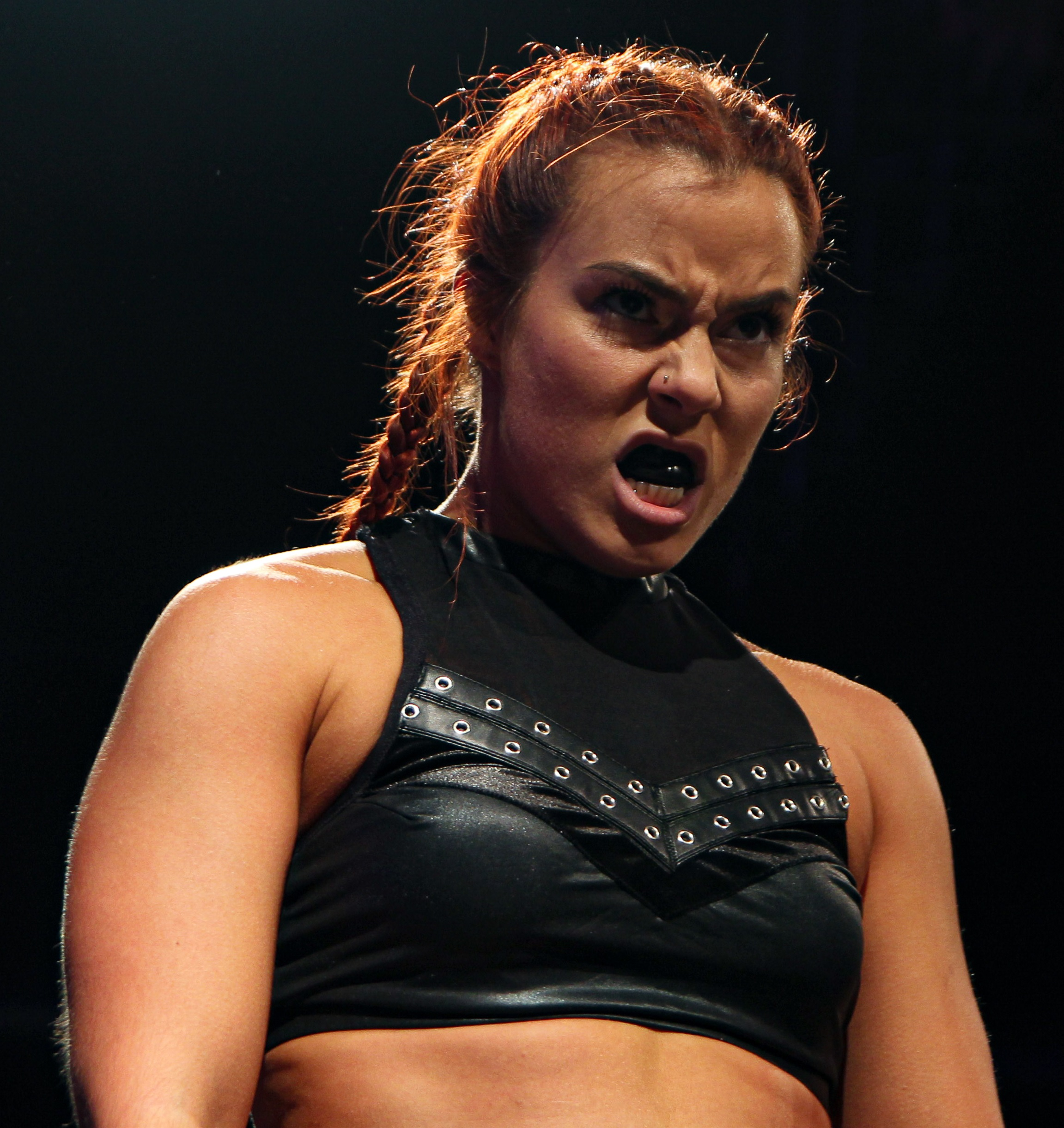
- Kelly in 2019

Personal information
- Born: Raquel Lourenço; 21 March 1992 (age 34) Lisbon, Portugal
- Spouse: Myron Reed
- Children: 1

Professional wrestling career
- Ring name(s): Kelly; Killer Kelly; Raquel Lourenço
- Billed height: 5 ft 7 in (170 cm)
- Billed weight: 128 lb (58 kg)
- Billed from: Lisbon, Portugal
- Trained by: wXw Academy; Bruno "Bammer" Brito; Wrestling Portugal School
- Debut: 31 October 2016

Raquel Lourenço (born 21 March 1992), best known by her ring name Killer Kelly, is a Portuguese professional wrestler. She is best known for her tenure in Total Nonstop Action Wrestling (TNA), where she is a former two-time TNA Knockouts Tag Team Champion (with Masha Slamovich). She is also known for her tenure with WWE where she competed on the NXT UK brand, and for her time in the independent wrestling scene, mostly working in Westside Xtreme Wrestling as well as Pro-Wrestling: EVE.

== Professional wrestling career ==
=== Independent circuit (2016–2022) ===
Lourenço made her professional wrestling debut in 2016 for Wrestling Portugal as Kelly in a battle royal. Throughout the rest of 2016, Kelly continued to pick up victories in Wrestling Portugal. In May 2017, Kelly made her World Stars of Wrestling debut and was defeated by Nina Samuels. In August, now as Killer Kelly, she made her debut for Revolution Championship Wrestling, losing to Camille in her debut. The next night she teamed with Camille and Debbie Sharp where they were defeated by Dragonita, Hana Kimura and Kagetsu of Oedo Tai. In December 2017, she was defeated by Alpha Female at a Next Step Wrestling show. In March 2018, she made her debut for Pro-Wrestling: EVE, losing to Charlie Morgan. On 1 April 2018 she made her Revolution Pro Wrestling debut, losing to Bobbi Tyler. In late April she was defeated by Viper. On 1 February 2020, Kelly was announced to be competing against Allysin Kay at Josh Barnett's Bloodsport during WrestleMania weekend. However, that event was postponed due to the 2019-20 coronavirus pandemic.

=== Westside Xtreme Wrestling (2017–2022) ===
Killer Kelly made her Westside Xtreme Wrestling (wXw) debut at Femmes Fatales 2017, losing to Laura Di Matteo. The same day she was defeated by Jinny. At wXw's 17th anniversary show, she became the inaugural wXw Women's Champion after defeating Melanie Gray in the finals of the Women's title tournament after both women scored the most points in the tournament. A month later she lost the title to Toni Storm. On an episode of Shotgun, she was defeated by Veda Scott. In May 2018, Kelly and Marius Al-Ani defeated Absolute Andy and Melanie Gray. On 19 May Kelly and Toni Storm defeated LuFisto and Gray.

=== WWE (2018–2020) ===
Lourenço made her WWE debut on the first night of the 2018 United Kingdom Championship tournament in a three-way number one contenders match for the NXT Women's Championship. The following night she was defeated by Charlie Morgan. She competed in the 2018 Mae Young Classic, losing to Meiko Satomura in the first round. On the 24 October edition of NXT UK, she would lose to Dakota Kai. In January 2020, Kelly was released by WWE.

=== Progress Wrestling (2018) ===
In July 2018, she made her Progress Wrestling debut at Chapter 73, losing to Toni Storm.

=== Impact Wrestling/Total Nonstop Action Wrestling (2020, 2022–2026) ===
On 14 November 2020, at Turning Point, Impact Wrestling confirmed that Kelly would make her debut on Impact by participating at a tournament to crown the new Impact Knockouts Tag Team Champions along with Renee Michelle. Kelly made her official debut on the 24 November episode of Impact! where she faced Kimber Lee in a losing effort. On the 1 December episode of Impact!, Kelly and Michelle were defeated by Jazz and Jordynne Grace during the first round of the Knockouts Tag Team Championship Tournament. On the 7 July 2022 episode of Impact!, a vignette of Kelly was aired upon her return. She made her return on the 4 August episode of Impact!, attacking two local talents after their match and setting her sights on Tasha Steelz. The following week, Kelly made her in-ring return, defeating Tiffany Nieves in a quick squash. Throughout the summer, Kelly started going after Steelz and Savannah Evans. On 23 September, at the Countdown to Victory Road pre-show, Kelly lost to Steelz by disqualification after choking the referee and Steelz with a steel chain. At Bound for Glory, she competed in the Call Your Shot Gauntlet, where the winner could choose any championship match of their choice, being eliminated by Steelz. The following night, (which aired on tape delay on 13 October), Kelly defeated Steelz in a no disqualification match.

On 13 January 2023, at Hard To Kill, Kelly competed in a four-way match to determine the number one contender to the Impact Knockouts World Championship, which was won by Masha Slamovich. On the following week's episode of Impact!, Kelly defeated Taylor Wilde. In February, Kelly started teaming with Wilde and fought Impact Knockouts World Tag Team Champions The Death Dollz (Jessicka, Rosemary and Taya Valkyrie) in a non-title bout, but lost when Wilde played with her tarot cards and refused to help Kelly. On the 9 March episode of Impact!, Kelly confronted Wilde over the incident, but was attacked by the debuting KiLynn King. On 16 April, at Rebellion, Kelly fought for Team Dreamer and won a 10-wrestler Hardcore War against Team Bully. On the 11 May episode of Impact!, Kelly was pinned by Slamovich in a match while she was trapped in the Killer Clutch submission, though Kelly refused to release the hold afterwards. Some weeks later on 25 May and into Under Siege, the two were found to be brawling throughout the crowd, with a chain being used as a weapon by both women. On 9 June at Against All Odds, Kelly was defeated by Slamovich in a dog collar match. On the 22 June episode of Impact!, after Kelly defeated Taylor Wilde, she was attacked by Wilde's ally KiLynn King, who are both the Knockouts World Tag Team Champions, until Slamovich saved Kelly. On 15 July at Slammiversary, Kelly and Slamovich who are now known as MK Ultra, defeated The Coven (King and Wilde) to win the Knockouts World Tag Team Championship. They would hold the titles until January 13, 2024, at Hard To Kill, when they lost the titles to Havok and Rosemary, only to regained them a month later. On March 8 at Sacrifice, Kelly and Slamovich were defeated by Spitfire (Dani Luna and Jody Threat), ending their reign at 14 days.

At Against All Odds event on June 6, 2025, Kelly made her first appearance in a year, confronting the TNA Knockouts World Champion Masha Slamovich after her match with Léi Yǐng Lee.

On the November 20, 2025 episode of Impact!, Kelly competed in a Four Way Match which was won by Xia Brookside which was her final match in the company.

On January 10, 2026, Fightful reported that Kelly's contract with TNA had expired, ending her four-year tenure with the promotion.

== Personal life ==
Lourenço has a brother. She started watching professional wrestling when she was 7. Prior to being trained, Lourenço had wrestled in backyard wrestling promotions. She names Low Ki, Gail Kim, Katsuyori Shibata, Asuka, Mickie James and Charlotte Flair as influences. In 2017, she moved to Duisburg, North Rhine-Westphalia, Germany. Lourenço streams on the Twitch platform on a weekly basis, where she streams wrestling watchalongs and horror based games.

She is in a relationship with fellow professional wrestler Myron Reed. On September 2, 2024, Lourenço announced that she was expecting her first child with Reed. They welcomed their first child, a daughter on November 6, 2024. In September 2025, Lourenço became engaged to Reed.

== Championships and accomplishments ==
- Classic Wrestling Entertainment
  - CWE Extreme Aggression Championship (1 time)
- Pro Wrestling Illustrated
  - Ranked No. 89 of the top 100 female wrestlers in the PWI Female 100 in 2020
  - Ranked No. 453 of the top 500 singles wrestlers in the PWI 500 in 2021
- Westside Xtreme Wrestling
  - wXw Women's Championship (1 time, inaugural)
  - wXw Women's Championship Tournament (2017)
- Total Nonstop Action Wrestling
  - TNA Knockouts World Tag Team Championship (2 times) – with Masha Slamovich
  - Impact Year End Awards (1 time)
    - Knockouts Tag Team of the Year (2023) with Masha Slamovich
