= Shanna (wrestler) =

Portuguese professional wrestler

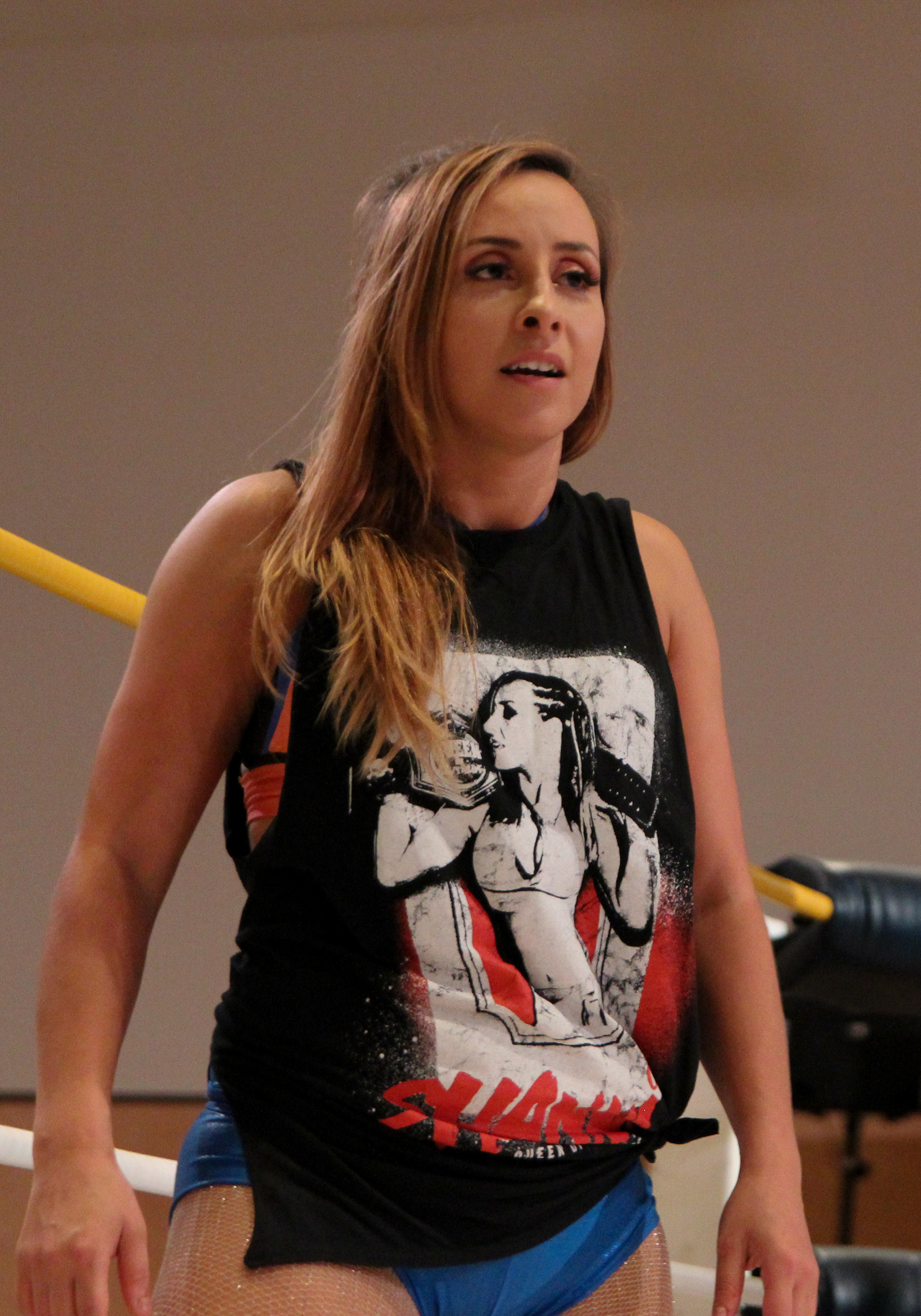
- Shanna in 2019

Personal information
- Born: Alexandra Barrulas; July 8, 1982 (age 44) Lisbon, Portugal

Professional wrestling career
- Ring name: Shanna
- Billed height: 1.64 m (5 ft 5 in)
- Billed weight: 57 kg (126 lb)
- Billed from: Nîmes, France
- Trained by: Florian Klonig; Wrestling Stars
- Debut: 2006
- Retired: 2023?

Twitch information
- Channel: Shannamania
- Genre: Gaming
- Followers: 1.9 thousand
- Last updated: August 16, 2025

Alexandra Barrulas (born July 8, 1982) is a Portuguese professional wrestler better known by her ring name Shanna. She is well known for her work in All Elite Wrestling (AEW), the German Wrestling Federation, Women Superstars Uncensored and on the British independent circuit competing in promotions such as Pro-Wrestling: EVE and Kamikaze Pro.

== Professional wrestling career ==
=== Total Nonstop Action Wrestling (2014) ===
In February 2014 Shanna was booked to appear on TNA's Maximum Impact tour of the United Kingdom. In this tour, she wrestled Alpha Female on her first night in a winning effort but then lost to Gail Kim on her second night.

=== World Wonder Ring Stardom (2016-2018) ===
In June 2016 Shanna traveled to Japan for a two-month tour with the all-female promotion Stardom. In her first match of the tour, she defeated Hiromi Mimura. On the second night, she unsuccessfully challenged Io Shirai for the SWA World Championship. During the tour, she unsuccessfully challenged Mayu Iwatani for the High Speed Championship. On her last night of the tour, she unsuccessfully challenged Toni Storm for the SWA World Championship. On July 16, 2017, Shanna defeated Kris Wolf to become the new High Speed Champion. She lost the title to Mari Apache on August 13.

=== All Elite Wrestling (2019−2021) ===
Shanna made her All Elite Wrestling (AEW) debut on the October 30, 2019 episode of Dynamite, losing to Hikaru Shida. It was later reported that she had signed a three-year contract with AEW. On February 26, 2020 episode of Dynamite, she wrestled in a Four-Way match against Big Swole, Hikaru Shida, and Yuka Sakazaki which was eventually won by Shida. On the December 1, 2020 episode of AEW Dark, Shanna resumed wrestling for AEW following an eight month absence, winning over Tesha Price. On June 1, 2021, it was announced that AEW wasn't renewing Shanna's contract.

== Other media ==
Outside the ring, Shanna spends her down time streaming on Twitch, playing games such as League of Legends, Final Fantasy, and more.

== Championships and accomplishments ==
- Association Biterroise de Catch (ABC)
  - ABC Women's Championship (2 times, current)
- German Wrestling Federation
  - GSW Ladies Champion (1 time)
- Kamikaze Pro
  - Kamikaze Pro Fighting Females Championship (1 time, inaugural)
- Power of Wrestling
  - POW Ladies Championship (1 time)
- Pro-Wrestling: EVE
  - 2013 Queen of the Ring
- Southside Wrestling Entertainment
  - Queen Of Southside Championship (1 time)
- Swiss Championship Wrestling
  - SCW Ladies Championship (1 time)
- Turkish Power Wrestling
  - Ladies Crown (1 time)
- Women Superstars Uncensored
  - 2013 International J Cup Winner
- World Wonder Ring Stardom
  - High Speed Championship (1 time)
- World Wrestling Professionals
  - WWP World Ladies Championship (1 time)
