= Westside Xtreme Wrestling =

German professional wrestling promotion

- Acronym: wXw
- Founded: 2000
- Headquarters: Gelsenkirchen, Germany
- Founder: Hate (Peter Wiechers)
- Owner(s): Hate (2000–2006) wXw Germany GbR (2006–2009) wXw Europe GmbH (2009–present)
- Website: wxw-wrestling.com

Westside Xtreme Wrestling, commonly shortened to wXw, is a German professional wrestling promotion based in Gelsenkirchen, North Rhine-Westphalia. wXw has been one of the leading professional wrestling promotions in Germany, and most of its events have been held in the Ruhr district, primarily in Oberhausen. Since 2013, wXw regularly tours throughout Germany, adding tour stops outside the country including Switzerland, the Czech Republic and England

== History ==
Westside Xtreme Wrestling was founded on December 24, 2000, by Peter Wiechers, a professional wrestler with the ring name Hate. Together with SigMasta Rappo, Tyrant, Mark Hammer, Blue Adonis, Barish, Thunder and Claudio Castagnoli, he held an event called "wXw Extreme Wrestling Party" in the disco "Roxy" in Essen. wXw has become one of the most notable professional wrestling promotions in Germany.

In 2016, wXw became the first German wrestling promotion with an on-demand service similar to WWE's network, called wXwNOW.

== wXwNOW ==
wXwNOW is a subscription-based video streaming service owned by German professional wrestling promotion Westside Xtreme Wrestling (wXw). In 2016, wXw started "wXwNOW", a new worldwide streaming site for the promotion's events. All major wXw events air live on the service, which also features matches from the promotion's archives, dating back to 2002. wXwNOW Network operates similarly to WWE Network. The service has a current monthly subscription price of €9.99.

== Co-promotion ==
Since its creation, wXw has developed working relationships with several American promotions including Chikara, Pro Wrestling Guerrilla, Beyond Wrestling, Combat Zone Wrestling (CZW) and Evolve and several Japanese promotions including Dragon Gate, Pro Wrestling Noah, Dramatic Dream Team and Big Japan Pro Wrestling. Through the working relationship with wXw, Big Japan's World Strong Heavyweight Championship features both the CZW and wXw logos.

wXw has also maintained relationships with several European-based promotions, including British promotions International Pro Wrestling: United Kingdom, Preston City Wrestling, All Star Wrestling, and Progress Wrestling.

wXw has held several interpromotional events, including Gorefest – European King of the Death Matches 2006 took place in the United Kingdom, a hardcore-focused event co-promoted with the English-based X-Sports: Wrestling. The second Gorefest, held in 2009, included a title match between Drake Younger and Devon Moore for Combat Zone Wrestling's Heavyweight Championship.

The 2008 event Dead End VIII featured the Japanese-based Pro Wrestling Noah and its rosters such as KENTA, Go Shiozaki, Takashi Sugiura and Kenta Kobashi. The 2009 events, Open the Spanish Gate and Open The German Gate took place in Barcelona, Spain and Oberhausen, Germany, respectively, were co-promoted with the Japanese-based Dragon Gate.

On March 13, 2010, wXw held its first event in the US, The Vision took place in front of an audience of over 450 at The Arena in Philadelphia, Pennsylvania. The event also featured a title match for one of CZW's titles, the CZW Ultraviolent Underground Championship, along with wXw's famous feud being between Thumbtack Jack and Drake Younger.

On April 8, 9, and 10, 2011, wXw held its second and third events in the USA first with F1 vs. wXw on April 8 in Egg Harbor Township, New Jersey, USA at the Spontaneous Sports Complex and wXw Kreuzzug ZXI day 1 being in Philadelphia, Pennsylvania in the Asylum Arena and day 2 being in Union City, New Jersey in the ACE Arena.

On July 24, 2014, wXw started a partnership with Jeff Jarrett's Global Force Wrestling promotion which ended in 2017 due to GFW ending.

On July 18, 2015, New Japan Pro-Wrestling started a working relationship with wXw as part of New Japan's international expansion plans which ended in early 2016 due to wXw working with too many promotions, not having any collaborated events, not being in NJPW events in Europe, not having wXw titles being defended in NJPW events and no talent exchanges.

On July 2, 2018, wXw started a working relationship with WWNLive, with wXw becoming an official partner of the WWN Training Center. Later that year on October 1, a relationship with WWE began.

On April 4, 2019 wXw held its fourth event in the US, wXw Amerika Ist Wunderbar Live From New York City took place in La Boom in Queens, New York.

== Championships and accomplishments ==
=== Current championships ===
Championship	Current champion(s)	Reign	Date won	Days held	Location	Notes
wXw Unified World Wrestling Championship	Ahura	1	August 15, 2026	81+	Oberhausen, Germany	Defeated Elijah Blum to win the title at wXw Shortcut To The Top 2026.
wXw Shotgun Championship	Alex Duke	3	September 27, 2026	38+	Oberhausen, Germany	Defeated Miles Deville, Robert Dreissker and Zoltan to win the vacant title at Pro-Wrestling Grand Prix 2026 - Day 3.
wXw European Championship	Laurance Roman	1	September 27, 2026	38+	Oberhausen, Germany	Defeated Dieter Schwartz at Pro-Wrestling Grand Prix 2026 - Day 3.
wXw World Tag Team Championship	CSI (Luca De Leone and Nordino)	1	August 15, 2026	81+	Oberhausen, Germany	Defeated Planet Gojirah (Marc Empire and Robert Dreissker) at wXw Shortcut To The Top 2026.
wXw Women's World Championship	Chihiro Hashimoto	1	September 27, 2026	38+	Oberhausen, Germany	Defeated Kanji in the finals of the 2026 wXw Femmes Fatales tournament to win the reactivated championship.
wXw Academy Championship	Gabriel Queen	1	September 30, 2026	35+	Gelsenkirchen, Germany	Defeated Sam Della Valle at Heat in Der wXw Wrestling Academy for the vacant title.

=== Defunct championships ===
Championship	First Champion	Final champion	Date won	Location	Notes
wXw World Lightweight Championship	Mad Cow	Zack Sabre Jr.	June 5, 2010	Oberhausen, Germany	Defeated Steve Douglas at Dead End X to unify the Lightweight Title with the Heavyweight Title to create the wXw Unified World Wrestling Championship
wXw Hardcore Championship	Eiji Kushinawa	Necro Butcher	August 1, 2006	Plainfield, Indiana	Defeated Ian Rotten and JC Bailey in a three-way elimination Texas Deathmatch at IWA Mid-South April Bloodshowers 2006

=== wXw Academy Championship ===
As of November 4, 2026.

wXw Academy Trophy Championship
- Current title design

Details
- Promotion: Westside Xtreme Wrestling
- Date established: December 2015
- Current champion: Aleksander Bellamy
- Date won: 4 March 2026

Other name
- wXw Academy Trophy Championship
Statistics
- First champion: Johnny Evers
- Most reigns: All titleholders (1 reign)
- Longest reign: Goldenboy Santos (748 days)
- Shortest reign: Emilian Lewis (14 days)
- Heaviest champion: Oskar and Danny Fray (242 lb (110 kg))
- Lightest champion: The Rotation (163 lb (74 kg))

The wXw Academy Championship is a professional wrestling championship owned and created by Westside Xtreme Wrestling. The title is contested for by rookie wrestlers trained at the wXw Wrestling Academy. From 2015 to 2023, the championship activated as the wXw Academy Trophy Championship. In 2023, the title was replaced and renamed as the wXw Academy Championship, with a new belt starting a new lineage. Cumulated, there have been a total of seventeen reigns shared between fifteen different champions and a two vacancies. The current champion is Aleksander Bellamy who is in his first reign.

==== wXw Academy Trophy Championship ====
Key
No.	Overall reign number
Reign	Reign number for the specific champion
Days	Number of days held
+	Current reign is changing daily

No.	Champion	Championship change			Reign statistics		Notes	Ref.
No.	Champion	Date	Event	Location	Reign	Days	Notes	Ref.
1	Johnny Evers	December 12, 2015	wXw Academy Scouting The Next Generation 2	Essen, Germany	1	322	Evers defeated Dirty Dragan, Francis Kaspin and Maggot in a four-way match to become the inaugural champion.	
2	The Rotation	October 29, 2016	wXw Academy Scouting The Next Generation 10	Essen, Germany	1	98		
3	Timo Theiss	February 4, 2017	wXw Academy Scouting The Next Generation 13	Essen, Germany	1	140		
4	Julian Pace	June 24, 2017	wXw Academy Scouting The Next Generation 17	Essen, Germany	1	366	This was a best two-out-of-three falls match.	
5	Benjamin Van Es	June 25, 2018	wXw Academy Scouting The Next Generation 26	Essen, Germany	1	209	This was a no holds barred match.	
6	Vinny Vortex	January 20, 2019	wXw Academy Scouting The Next Generation 34	Essen, Germany	1	392		
7	Goldenboy Santos	February 16, 2020	wXw Academy Scouting The Next Generation 46	Essen, Germany	1	748	This was a three-way match also involving Norman Harras.	
8	Oskar	March 5, 2022	wXwNOW & Friends Showcase 2022	Oberhausen, Germany	1	441		
—	Deactivated	May 20, 2023	—	—	—	—	Title was deactivated to immediately replaced with the wXw Academy Championship.	

==== wXw Academy Championship ====
Key
No.	Overall reign number
Reign	Reign number for the specific champion
Days	Number of days held
+	Current reign is changing daily

No.	Champion	Championship change			Reign statistics		Notes	Ref.
No.	Champion	Date	Event	Location	Reign	Days	Notes	Ref.
1	Nick Schreier	May 20, 2023	wXw Wrestling Academy Live Volume 9	Oberhausen, Germany	1	90	Defeated Alex Duke, Danny Fray and Darius in a four-way match to become the inaugural champion.	
2	Alex Duke	August 18, 2023	Passion Pro Spirit Zone	Budapest, Hungary	1	1	This was a four-way match also involving Danny Fray and Zafar Ameen.	
3	Nick Schreier	August 19, 2023	N/A	N/A	2	74		
4	Danny Fray	November 1, 2023	Heat In Der wXw Wrestling Academy	Gelsenkirchen, Germany	1	112		
5	Tatsuya Hanami	February 21, 2024	wXw Wrestling Academy Wrestling Im Hagenbusch	Marl, Germany	1	18		
6	Marc Empire	March 10, 2024	wXw We Love Wrestling	Oberhausen, Germany	1	255	This was a four-way match also involving Danny Fray and Axel Fox.	
—	Vacated	November 20, 2024	—	—	—	—		
7	Emilian Lewis	November 20, 2024	Heat In Der wXw Wrestling Academy	Gelsenkirchen, Germany	1	14	This was a five-way match also involving Dieter Schwartz, Emil Völler, Hunyadi Tamas and Leon Cage for the vacant title.	
8	M4	December 4, 2024	Heat In Der wXw Wrestling Academy	Gelsenkirchen, Germany	1	168		
9	Dieter Schwartz	May 21, 2025	wXw Wrestling Academy Wrestling Im Hagenbusch	Marl, Germany	1	93	This was a four-way match also involving Steven Crown and Yuval Goldshmit	
10	Zoltan	August 22, 2025	TAW Dojo Show	Dresden, Germany	1	35		
11	The Breezy Bruiser	November 5, 2025	Heat In Der wXw Wrestling Academy	Gelsenkirchen, Germany	1	119		
12	Aleksander Bellamy	March 4, 2026	Heat In Der wXw Wrestling Academy	Gelsenkirchen, Germany	1	210		
—	Vacated	September 30, 2026	—	—	—	—		
13	Gabriel Queen	September 30, 2026	Heat In Der wXw Wrestling Academy	Gelsenkirchen, Germany	1	35+	defeated Sam Della Valle for the vacant title	

=== Combined reigns ===
†	Indicates the current champion

Rank	Wrestler	No. of reigns	Combined days
1	Goldenboy Santos	1	748
2	Oskar	1	441
3	Vinny Vortex	1	392
4	Julian Pace	1	366
5	Johnny Evers	1	322
6	Marc Empire	1	255
7	Aleksander Bellamy	1	210
8	Benjamin Van Es	1	209
9	M4	1	168
10	Nick Schreier	2	164
11	Timo Theiss	1	140
12	The Breezy Bruiser	1	119
13	Danny Fray	1	112
14	The Rotation	1	98
15	Dieter Schwartz	1	93
16	Aleksander Bellamy	1	210
17	Zoltan	1	35
18	Tatsuya Hanami	1	18
19	Emilian Lewis	1	14
20	Gabriel Queen †	1	3+
21	Alex Duke	1	1

== wXw Hall of Fame ==
The wXw Hall of Fame is a German professional wrestling hall of fame maintained by the Oberhausen-based promotion Westside Xtreme Wrestling (wXw). It was established in 2005 to honor wrestlers who have wrestled for the promotion.

Inductees

#	Year	Ring name (Birth name) (Note: Entries without a birth name indicates that the inductee did not perform under a ring name.)	Notes (Note: This section mainly lists the major accomplishments of each inductee in wXw.)
1	2005	Mad Cow (Sander Rijnders)	Inaugural wXw World Heavyweight Champion (1 time), won the wXw Hardcore Championship (3 times)
2	2009	Baron Von Hagen (Torben Borzek)	Won the wXw World Tag Team Championship (2 times)
3	2010	Hate (Peter Wiechers)	Won the wXw Hardcore Championship (9 times), wXw World Tag Team Championship (2 times), founder and former owner of wXw.
4	2010	SigMasta Rappo (Pascal Signer)	Won the wXw Hardcore Championship (4 times), wXw World Tag Team Championship (2 times). SigMasta Rappo was removed from the wXw Hall of Fame in 2020.
5	2010	Thumbtack Jack (Alexander Bedranowsky)	Won the wXw Hardcore Championship (1 time)
6	2011	Marc Weingartner	Former Owner, Ringside Cameraman and wXw DVD Producer
7	2011	Alex Pain (Alexander Pohl)	Won the wXw World Heavyweight Championship (1 time), wXw Hardcore Championship (1 time), wXw World Tag Team Championship (1 time)
8	2012	Iceman (Isaac Harrop)	Won the wXw Hardcore Championship (1 time), wXw World Tag Team Championship (1 time)
9	2015	Steve Douglas (Steffen Leichsenring)	Won the wXw World Lightweight Championship (1 time), wXw World Tag Team Championship (3 times), wXw World Heavyweight Championship (2 times)
10	2015	Are$ (Marco Jaggi)	Won the wXw World Heavyweight Championship (2x), wXw World Tag Team Championship (3 times), holds record with 603 days reign as wXw World heavyweight champion.
11	2017	Karsten Beck (Karsten Pitann)	Won the wXw World Heavyweight Championship (2 times), wXw World Tag Team Championship (1 time)
12	2018	Doug Williams (Douglas Durdle)	Won the wXw World Tag Team Championship (1 time)
13	2019	Robbie Brookside (Robert Brooks)	Won the wXw World Heavyweight Championship (1 time)
14	2024	Absolute Andy (Andreas Ullmann)	Posthumous; Won the wXw Unified World Wrestling Championship (2 times), wXw Shotgun Championship (1 time), wXw World Tag Team Championship (5 times), 16 Carat Gold 2018

== wXw Academy ==
In 2016, wXw opened the first German wrestling academy with a seven-days course schedule in Essen. The wXw Academy training is open for members as well as guests that can also book a stay in an apartment adjoined to the academy. With "Scouting the next Generation", the wXw Academy introduced a series of monthly events in 2015 that provides trainees of the academy the opportunity to perform in front of a crowd.

In August 2022, the wXw Wrestling Academy moved to Gelsenkirchen.

== See also ==
- List of professional wrestling promotions in Europe
