= No Surrender (2026) =

TNA professional wrestling event

- Promotion: Total Nonstop Action Wrestling
- Date: February 13, 2026
- City: Nashville, Tennessee
- Venue: The Pinnacle

TNA+ Monthly Specials chronology
| ← Previous; Final Resolution | Next → Sacrifice |

No Surrender chronology
| ← Previous; 2024 | Next → — |

The 2026 No Surrender was a professional wrestling event produced by Total Nonstop Action Wrestling. It took place on February 13, 2026, at The Pinnacle in Nashville, Tennessee and aired exclusively on TNA+. It was the 17th event under the No Surrender chronology. Wrestlers from WWE's NXT brand, with which TNA has a partnership, also appeared at the event.

Ten matches were contested at the event, including two on the Countdown to No Surrender pre-show. In the main event, TNA World Champion Mike Santana and TNA X Division Champion Leon Slater defeated Nic Nemeth and Eddie Edwards. In other prominent matches, NXT's Arianna Grace defeated Léi Yǐng Lee to win the TNA Knockouts World Championship, and Trey Miguel defeated NXT's Channing "Stacks" Lorenzo to win the TNA International Championship. The event featured an appearance by TNA Hall of Famer Mickie James.

== Production ==
=== Background ===
No Surrender is an annual professional wrestling event produced by Total Nonstop Action Wrestling (TNA). It was originally produced as a pay-per-view (PPV) event. The first one was held in July 2005, but when the PPV names were shuffled for 2006, it was moved to September. In December 2012, TNA announced that the event was canceled. The last event took place in the TNA Impact! Zone in September 2012. It was resumed as a special episode of Impact Wrestling between 2013 and 2015 and was then revived as an Impact Plus event in 2019.

On January 15, 2026, TNA announced that No Surrender would take place on February 13 at The Pinnacle in Nashville, Tennessee. This marked the resumption of the event series after no edition was produced in 2025.

=== Storylines ===
The event featured professional wrestling matches with results predetermined by TNA. Storylines were produced on the company's weekly program, Thursday Night Impact!.

At Slammiversary on July 20, 2025, Leon Slater defeated Moose to win the TNA X Division Championship, becoming the youngest X Division Champion at age 20. As the X Division Champion, Slater also has the right to relinquish the title for a TNA World Championship match under a provision known as "Option C", which was established when then-General Manager Hulk Hogan offered the longest-reigning X Dvision Champion Austin Aries for a TNA World Heavyweight Championship match at Destination X on July 8, 2012, if he relinquished the title, which Aries accepted. At Bound for Glory on October 12, 2025, Nic Nemeth and Frankie Kazarian pinned each other and became co-winners of the Call Your Shot Gauntlet, earning a shot at the TNA World Championship at any time of their choosing. Later that night, after Mike Santana won the TNA World Championship by defeating Trick Williams, Nemeth attempted to invoke his title opportunity but was stopped by a returning Elijah. At Genesis on January 17, 2026, Nemeth served as the special guest referee in the Texas Deathmatch between Santana and Kazarian for the TNA World Championship. After Santana defeated Kazarian, Nemeth hit Santana with the Danger Zone and attempted to invoke his title opportunity. Before a referee could enter the ring, Santana got up and hit the Spin the Block on Nemeth to prevent him from getting his title match that night. On the January 22, 2026, episode of Impact!, Eddie Edwards competed in the 2026 Feast or Fired match and was the last participant to secure a briefcase, Case No. 3. On the following week's episode, the contents of the cases were revealed; Edwards' case contained a contract for a future TNA World Championship match. On the February 5 episode of Impact!, TNA Director of Operations Daria Rae announced a tag team match between TNA World Champion Mike Santana and X Division Champion Leon Slater against Call Your Shot Gauntlet co-winner Nic Nemeth and Feast or Fired TNA World Championship match winner Eddie Edwards, setting up a match involving the TNA World Champion and three wrestlers each with the right to a future TNA World Championship match.

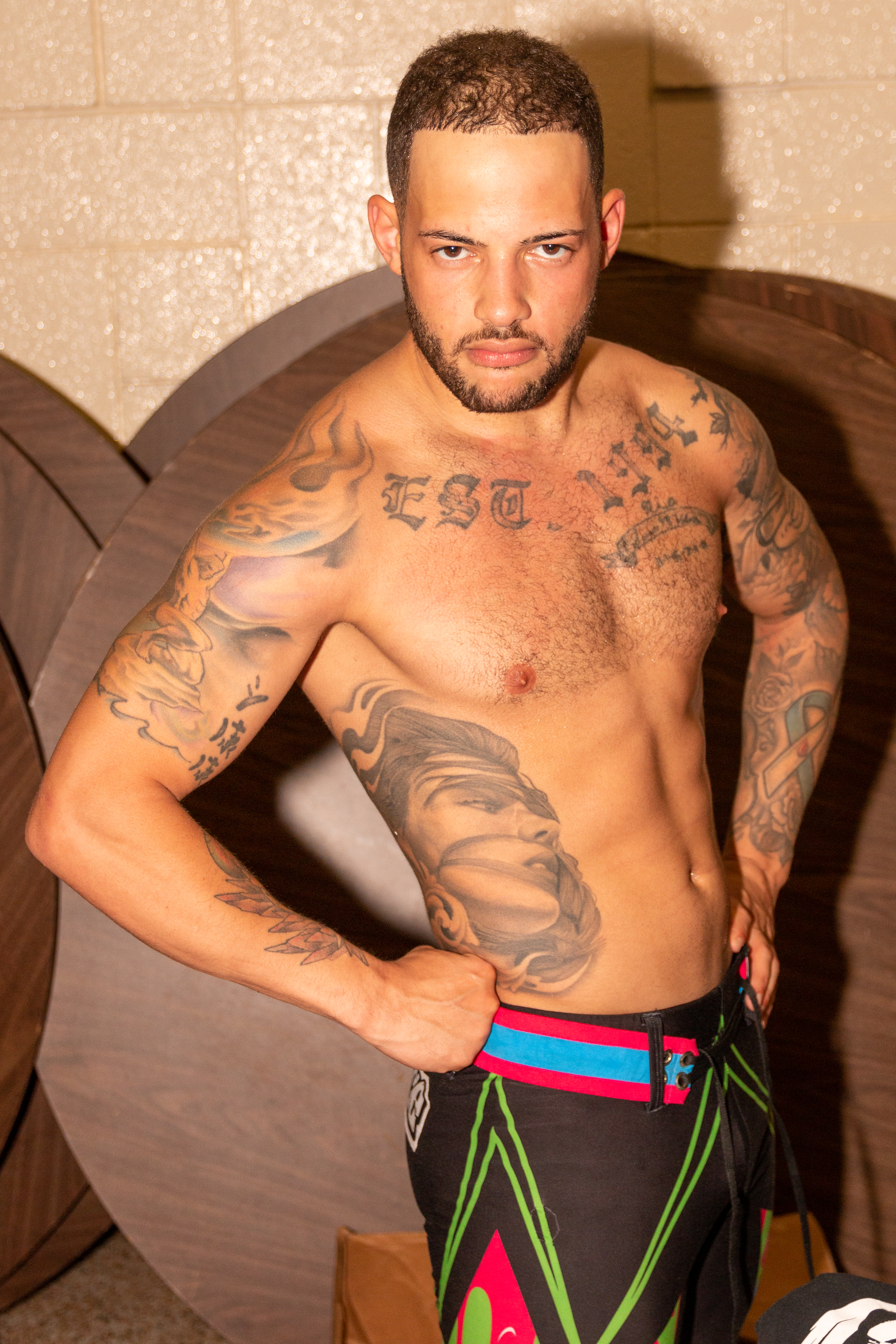
Trey Miguel had his Feast or Fired TNA International Championship match at No Surrender

On the January 22, 2026, episode of Impact!, Trey Miguel made his return to TNA and participated in the 2026 Feast or Fired match. Miguel was one of four competitors to successfully secure a briefcase, obtaining Case No. 4. On the following week's episode, the contents of the cases were revealed; Miguel's case contained a contract for a future TNA International Championship match. On the February 5 episode of Impact!, TNA Director of Operations Daria Rae officially sanctioned the title bout, announcing that Miguel would invoke his championship opportunity at No Surrender against the reigning champion Channing "Stacks" Lorenzo.

On the February 5, 2026, episode of Impact!, Arianna Grace confronted her father, TNA Director of Authority Santino Marella. Grace expressed frustration over a lack of opportunities in NXT and requested a championship match to "prove her independence" as a competitor. Marella initially declined the request, citing nepotism concerns. Grace argued that it would make up for Marella missing her 16th birthday, leading Marella to eventually concede. Later that evening, Marella officially announced that Léi Yǐng Lee would defend the TNA Knockouts World Championship against Grace at No Surrender.

On Impact! on February 5, 2026, Eric Young confronted BDE backstage about joining him in "the cleanse of TNA". Young told him that he expects an answer on the following week. On the February 12 episode of Impact!, Young asked BDE if he will join him in cleansing TNA. He stated that he does not understand BDE's popularity, but he knows that he needs him in fighting the politicians in the company. BDE declined, stating that he does not need Young as he only needs the fans' support. Young retaliated by hitting him with a microphone. A bunch of referees came out try to stop Young's attack, but he was still able to hit BDE with a piledriver. More security arrived to intervene which led to Young attacking the referees, including a few piledrivers to security guards. Backstage, security tried remove Young from the arena. TNA Director of Authority Santino Marella tried to suspend Young for attacking an official, but TNA Director of Operations Daria Rae announced that a higher authority in TNA has booked a match between BDE and Young at No Surrender.

On the January 22, 2026, episode of Impact!, Indi Hartwell fought one-half of the TNA Knockouts World Tag Team Champions M by Elegance of The Elegance Brand. Hartwell reversed a roll-up attempt by M to get the pinfall victory. Two weeks later on Impact!, Hartwell, Xia Brookside, and TNA Knockouts World Champion Léi Ying Lee defeated Ash by Elegance and the TNA Knockouts World Tag Team Champions Heather by Elegance and M by Elegance of The Elegance Brand, where Brookside used a butterfly pin on M to get the victory. On the following week's episode of Impact!, Hartwell and Brookside stated that because each of them gained a pinfall victory against the TNA Knockouts World Tag Team Champions recently, they should have a shot at their title, which was made official for No Surrender.

== Reception ==
Chris Vetter of Pro Wrestling Dot Net praised both the tag team main event and the eight-man tag bout despite not having stakes, commended the Knockouts World Title match for being "pretty entertaining" while giving note of Grace's performance, and critiqued that the International Title match "felt a bit off at times," concluding that its "[N]ot a terrible show, but not a must-see show either. It did have the feel of being thrown together at the last minute." Thomas Hall of 411Mania gave the event a 7.5 out of 10, saying: "I came into this show with pretty much no expectations and the stakes feeling pretty low (including in the main event, with the three teased cash-ins not really being a thing until tonight) and wound up getting a good show. It’s not a classic or close to it, but I can always go for a show where the worst part was perfectly fine. They'll need to raise the stakes next time, but this worked for a nice surprise."

== Results ==
| No. | Results | Stipulations | Times |
|---|---|---|---|
| 1^{P} | Sinner & Saint (Judas Icarus and Travis Williams) defeated Brad Attitude and TW3 by pinfall | Tag team match | 6:50 |
| 2^{P} | Frankie Kazarian defeated Alan Angels by submission | Singles match | 2:20 |
| 3 | Jody Threat won by last eliminating Tessa Blanchard (Note: Order of elimination from first eliminated: Rosemary, Tasha Steelz, Jada Stone, Harley Hudson, Myla Grace, Mila Moore, Victoria Crawford, Elayna Black, Mara Sadè, Tessa Blanchard) | Knockouts battle royal for a future TNA Knockouts World Championship match | 7:54 |
| 4 | Trey Miguel (with Teddy Swims) defeated Channing "Stacks" Lorenzo (c) (with Arianna Grace) by pinfall | Singles match for the TNA International Championship; This was Miguel's Feast or Fired International Title match. | 10:57 |
| 5 | Mance Warner (with Steph De Lander) defeated "Action" Mike Jackson by pinfall | Singles match | 5:22 |
| 6 | The Elegance Brand (Heather by Elegance and M by Elegance) (c) (with Ash by Elegance, Mr. Elegance, and The Personal Concierge) defeated Indi Hartwell and Xia Brookside by pinfall | Tag team match for the TNA Knockouts World Tag Team Championship | 11:10 |
| 7 | Eric Young defeated BDE by pinfall | Singles match | 10:59 |
| 8 | Arianna Grace (with Channing "Stacks" Lorenzo) defeated Léi Yǐng Lee (c) by pinfall | Singles match for the TNA Knockouts World Championship | 13:25 |
| 9 | Order 4 (Mustafa Ali, Jason Hotch, John Skyler, and Special Agent 0) (with Tasha Steelz) defeated The Hardys (Jeff Hardy and Matt Hardy) and The Righteous (Vincent and Dutch) by pinfall | Eight-man tag team match | 14:52 |
| 10 | Mike Santana and Leon Slater defeated Nic Nemeth and Eddie Edwards by pinfall | Tag team match | 23:19 |
(c) / – the champion(s) heading into the match; P / – the match was broadcast on the pre-show
