= The Elegance Brand =

Professional wrestling stable

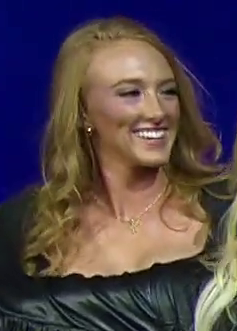
- M by Elegance, the leader of The Elegance Brand

Tag team
- Name: The Elegance Brand
- Members: M by Elegance (II); Heather by Elegance
- Former members: Ash by Elegance (I); Mr. Elegance; The Personal Concierge (manager)
- Debut: October 26, 2024
- Years active: 2024–present

The Elegance Brand is a villainous professional wrestling tag team that performs in Total Nonstop Action Wrestling (TNA) consisting of M by Elegance and Heather by Elegance. M was the inaugural TNA Knockouts Television Champion.

Originally a stable including original leader Ash by Elegance, the stable achieved success in TNA with Ash being a former one-time TNA Knockouts World Champion and a former one-time TNA Knockouts World Tag Team Champion, while Heather and M are former two-time TNA Knockouts World Tag Team Champions.

== History ==
=== Total Nonstop Action Wrestling (TNA) (2024–present) ===
==== Ash by Elegance's leadership (2024–2026) ====
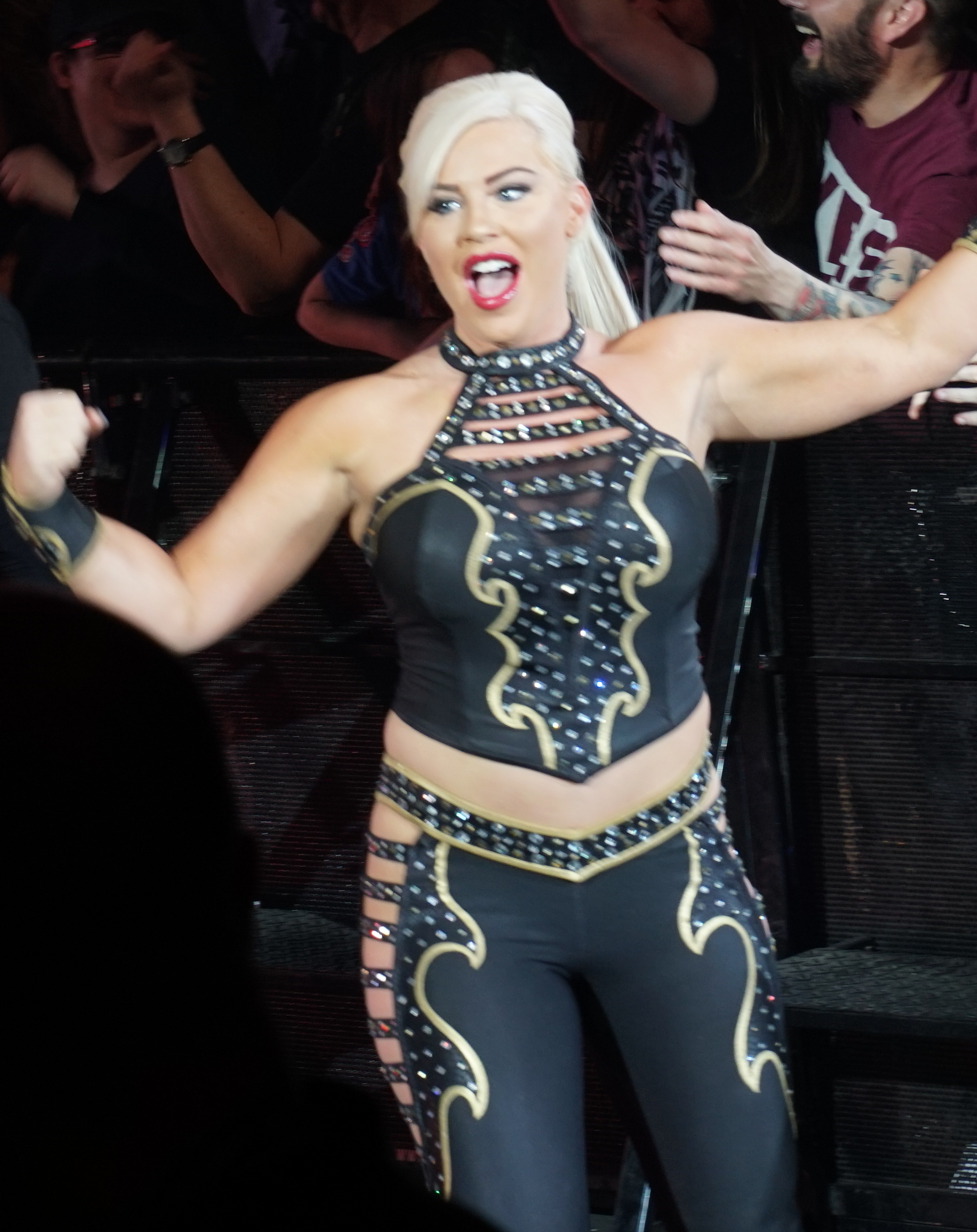
Ash by Elegance, the original leader of the Elegance Brand

Ash by Elegance made her TNA debut at Hard To Kill 2024, with the Personal Concierge as her manager and personal announcer. In the autumn of 2024, Ash and Heather Reckless formed a partnership in which they helped each other win matches. Reckless would become rebranded as Heather by Elegance with a new look similar to Ash's. On October 26 at Bound for Glory, Ash and Heather officially debuted The Elegance Brand in a winning effort against Xia Brookside and Brinley Reece. In the following two months, The Elegance Brand traded victories in singles matches with the reigning TNA Knockouts World Tag Team Champions Dani Luna and Jody Threat. At Genesis on January 19, 2025, Ash and Heather failed to defeat Luna and Threat for the titles. They redeemed themselves at Sacrifice on March 14 as they successfully dethroned Luna and Threat to win the TNA Knockouts World Tag Team Championship.

On the May 29, 2025, episode of Impact!, The Personal Concierge announced Maggie Lee as M by Elegance, the new product of The Elegance Brand. Ash and Heather successfully defended their titles against The IInspiration (Cassie Lee and Jessie McKay) at Slammiversary on July 20. On August 24 at Heatwave, Ash won the TNA Knockouts World Championship for the first time in a triple threat match against previous champion Jacy Jayne and Masha Slamovich, but she had to vacate the title for an undisclosed reason at Victory Road on September 26, ending her reign at 34 days. On the October 2 episode of Impact!, Heather and M lost the TNA Knockouts Tag Team Championships to The IInspiration. On October 10, Ash announced her retirement from professional wrestling during a virtual signing, but kept working with TNA as a producer and The Elegance Brand's sporadic manager.

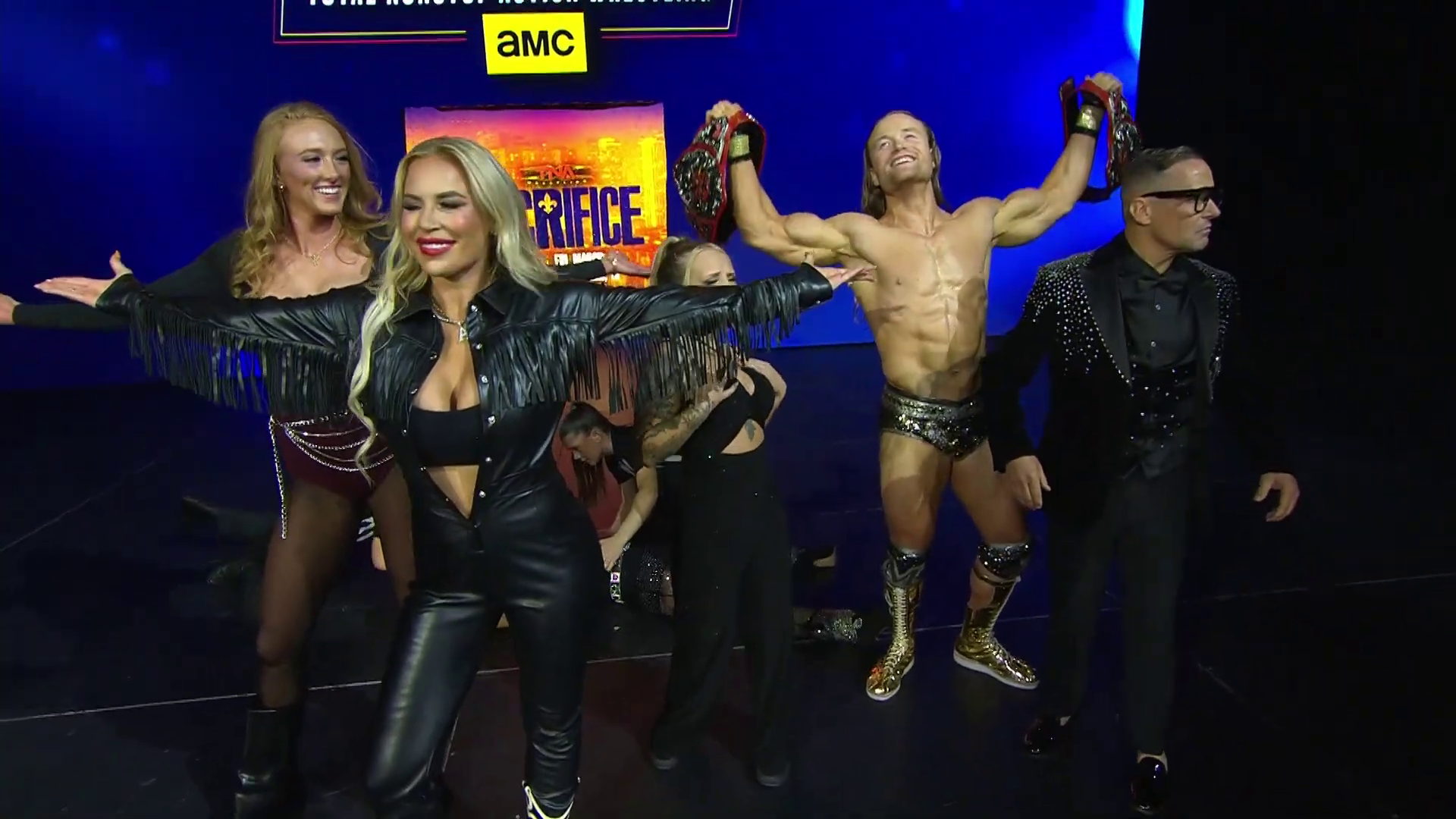
The Elegance Brand in February 2026, from left to right: M by Elegance, Ash by Elegance, Heather by Elegance, Mr. Elegance, and The Personal Concierge

Before challenging The IInspiration for the TNA Knockouts Tag Team Championship at Thursday Night Impact!'s AMC debut on January 15, 2026, The Elegance Brand revealed the newest member Mr. Elegance. Then, Heather and M won the tag team titles back from The IInspiration. On the March 19 episode of Thursday Night Impact!, Mr. Elegance won his first match against Mike Jackson. On June 28 at Slammiversary, Heather and M once again lost the TNA Knockouts World Tag Team Championship, this time to DemonXBunny (Rosemary and Allie), while Mr. Elegance failed to win the TNA X Division Championship in an Ultimate X match; the event also marked Ash's final appearance as a member of the Elegance Brand due to ongoing health concerns. From July 1 to August 27, both Heather and M participated in a tournament to crown the inaugural TNA Knockouts Television Champion; Heather was eliminated in the semifinals by Jada Stone while M defeated the aforementioned Stone in the final to become the inaugural TNA Knockouts Television Champion, marking her first singles title in TNA.

==== M by Elegance's leadership (2026–present) ====
On the October 22, 2026 episode of Impact, M announced that she would take over the leadership of The Elegance Brand, thus becoming the de facto leader with Ash inactive due to health concerns. On the October 29, 2026 episode of Impact, Mr. Elegance left the stable after refusing to help M during her TNA Knockouts Television Championship match against Jada Stone. On November 6, 2026, The Personal Concierge departed TNA, thus ending his time with the stable and reverting The Elegance Brand to a tag team of Heather and M.

== Members ==
*	Founding member
I-II	Leader
M	Manager

Member		Joined
M by Elegance (II)		October 26, 2024
Heather by Elegance	*	October 26, 2024

=== Former members ===
Member		Joined	Left
Ash by Elegance (I)	*	October 26, 2024	June 28, 2026 (Note: Never officially left the stable. Date marks last appearance with the stable.) (Note: Ash temporarily left the stable from October 10, 2025 to January 15, 2026.)
Mr. Elegance		January 15, 2026	October 29, 2026
The Personal Concierge (M)	*	May 29, 2025	November 6, 2026

== Championships and accomplishments ==
- Total Nonstop Action Wrestling
  - TNA Knockouts World Championship (1 time) – Ash
  - TNA Knockouts Television Championship (1 time, inaugural) - M
  - TNA Knockouts World Tag Team Championship (2 times) – Ash, Heather, and M (1), Heather and M (1)
  - TNA Year End Awards (2 times)
    - Knockout of the Year (2025) – Ash
    - Knockouts Tag Team of the Year (2025)
