= TNA Genesis =

Genesis
- Logo used since 2025
- Promotions: Total Nonstop Action Wrestling
- First event: Genesis (2005)

Genesis is an annual professional wrestling pay-per-view (PPV) event promoted by Total Nonstop Action Wrestling (TNA). The name was originally used on May 9, 2003, for a two-hour DirecTV special that highlighted early moments in TNA's history.

Genesis was actually not amongst the original names used by TNA for its first twelve pay-per-view events, but ultimately was added to the rotation as the thirteenth pay-per-view name during a time of name shuffling on the part of TNA Management. All events but three have been held in the Impact Zone. Originally, Genesis was held in November, but was moved to January starting in 2009. For this reason, 2008 did not have a Genesis PPV event. There have only been eight World Championship matches in the main event. Genesis was later televised as an Impact Wrestling television special on Spike TV on January 16, 2014, and on Pop in 2017 and 2018.

On December 12, 2020, at Final Resolution, it was announced that Genesis would be revived as a monthly special for Impact Plus on January 9, 2021.

On October 26, 2024, at Bound for Glory, it was announced that Genesis will return as a TNA pay-per-view event on January 19, 2025.

== History ==
Logo used from 2005 to 2021

The inaugural Genesis event took place on November 13, 2005, at the TNA Impact! Zone in Orlando, Florida. Since the fourth Genesis event, which took place on January 11, 2009, at the Bojangles' Coliseum in Charlotte, North Carolina, TNA begun to present Genesis on January moving forwards, instead of November as the first three Genesis events. In 2017, after Anthem Sports & Entertainment purchased a majority stake of TNA, Anthem re-branded TNA as Impact Wrestling. The 12th Genesis event, which took place on January 9, 2021, at the Skyway Studios in Nashville, Tennessee, was in front of no crowd attendance, as Impact had to present majority of their events behind closed doors due to the COVID-19 pandemic in the United States.

On October 26, 2024, at Bound for Glory, Santino Marella announced that Genesis would return on January 19, 2025, at the Curtis Culwell Center in Garland, Texas.

== Events ==
| # | Event | Date | City | Venue | Main event | Ref |
|---|---|---|---|---|---|---|
| 1 | Genesis (2005) | November 13, 2005 | Orlando, Florida | Impact Zone | Jeff Jarrett and America's Most Wanted (Chris Harris and James Storm) vs. Rhino and Team 3D (Brother Ray and Brother Devon) in a six-man tag team match | |
| 2 | TNA Genesis (2006) | November 19, 2006 | Orlando, Florida | Impact Zone | Kurt Angle vs. Samoa Joe | |
| 3 | Genesis (2007) | November 11, 2007 | Orlando, Florida | Impact Zone | Kurt Angle (c) and Kevin Nash vs. Booker T and Sting in a tag team match for the TNA World Heavyweight Championship | |
| 4 | Genesis (2009) | January 11, 2009 | Charlotte, North Carolina | Bojangles Coliseum | Mick Foley and The TNA Front Line (A.J. Styles and Brother Devon) vs. Cute Kip and The Main Event Mafia (Booker T and Scott Steiner) in a six-man tag team hardcore match | |
| 5 | Genesis (2010) | January 17, 2010 | Orlando, Florida | Impact Zone | A.J. Styles (c) vs. Kurt Angle in a Last Chance match for the TNA World Heavyweight Championship | |
| 6 | Genesis (2011) | January 9, 2011 | Orlando, Florida | Impact Zone | Jeff Hardy (c) vs. Mr. Anderson for the TNA World Heavyweight Championship | |
| 7 | Genesis (2012) | January 8, 2012 | Orlando, Florida | Impact Zone | Bobby Roode (c) vs. Jeff Hardy for the TNA World Heavyweight Championship | |
| 8 | Genesis (2013) | January 13, 2013 | Orlando, Florida | Impact Zone | Jeff Hardy (c) vs. Austin Aries vs. Bobby Roode in a three-way elimination match for the TNA World Heavyweight Championship | |
| 9 | Genesis (2014) | January 16, 2014 | Huntsville, Alabama | Von Braun Center | Ethan Carter III vs. Sting, with Magnus and Rockstar Spud as the special guest referees | |
| 9 | Genesis (2014) | January 23, 2014 (Taped January 16) | Huntsville, Alabama | Von Braun Center | Magnus (c) vs. Sting for the TNA World Heavyweight Championship | |
| 10 | Genesis (2017) | January 26, 2017 (Taped January 8) | Orlando, Florida | Impact Zone | Eddie Edwards (c) vs. Lashley in a 30-minute Iron Man match for the TNA World Heavyweight Championship | |
| 11 | Genesis (2018) | January 25, 2018 (Taped August 8–10, 2017) | Ottawa, Ontario, Canada | Aberdeen Pavilion | Eli Drake (c) vs. Alberto El Patron vs. Johnny Impact in a Six Sides of Steel match for the Impact Global Championship | |
| 12 | Genesis (2021) | January 9, 2021 | Nashville, Tennessee | Skyway Studios | Moose vs. Willie Mack in an "I Quit" match | |
| 13 | TNA Genesis (2025) | January 19, 2025 | Garland, Texas | Curtis Culwell Center | Nic Nemeth (c) vs. Joe Hendry for the TNA World Championship | |
| 14 | TNA Genesis (2026) | January 17, 2026 | Garland, Texas | Curtis Culwell Center | Mike Santana (c) vs. Frankie Kazarian in a Texas Deathmatch for the TNA World Championship | |
(c) – refers to the champion(s) heading into the match
