= TNA Genesis (2026) =

Professional wrestling event

Genesis
- Promotional poster featuring various TNA and WWE wrestlers
- Promotion: Total Nonstop Action Wrestling
- Date: January 17, 2026
- City: Garland, Texas
- Venue: Curtis Culwell Center
- Attendance: 3,946

Pay-per-view chronology
← Previous; Bound for Glory	Next → Rebellion

Genesis chronology
← Previous; 2025	Next → —

The 2026 edition of Genesis was a professional wrestling pay-per-view (PPV) event produced by Total Nonstop Action Wrestling (TNA). It took place on January 17, 2026, at the Curtis Culwell Center in Garland, Texas. It was the 14th event under the Genesis chronology. It also featured wrestlers from WWE's NXT brand, with which TNA has a partnership. The event featured JDC's final match in his 26-year wrestling career.

10 matches were contested at the event, including two on the Countdown to Genesis pre-show. In the main event, Mike Santana defeated Frankie Kazarian in a Texas Deathmatch to retain the TNA World Championship, with Nic Nemeth serving as the special guest referee. In other prominent matches, The Hardys (Matt Hardy and Jeff Hardy) defeated The Righteous (Vincent and Dutch) to retain the TNA World Tag Team Championship, Léi Yǐng Lee defeated NXT's Zaria to retain the TNA Knockouts World Championship, and Eddie Edwards defeated the aforementioned JDC in the latter's retirement match.

== Production ==
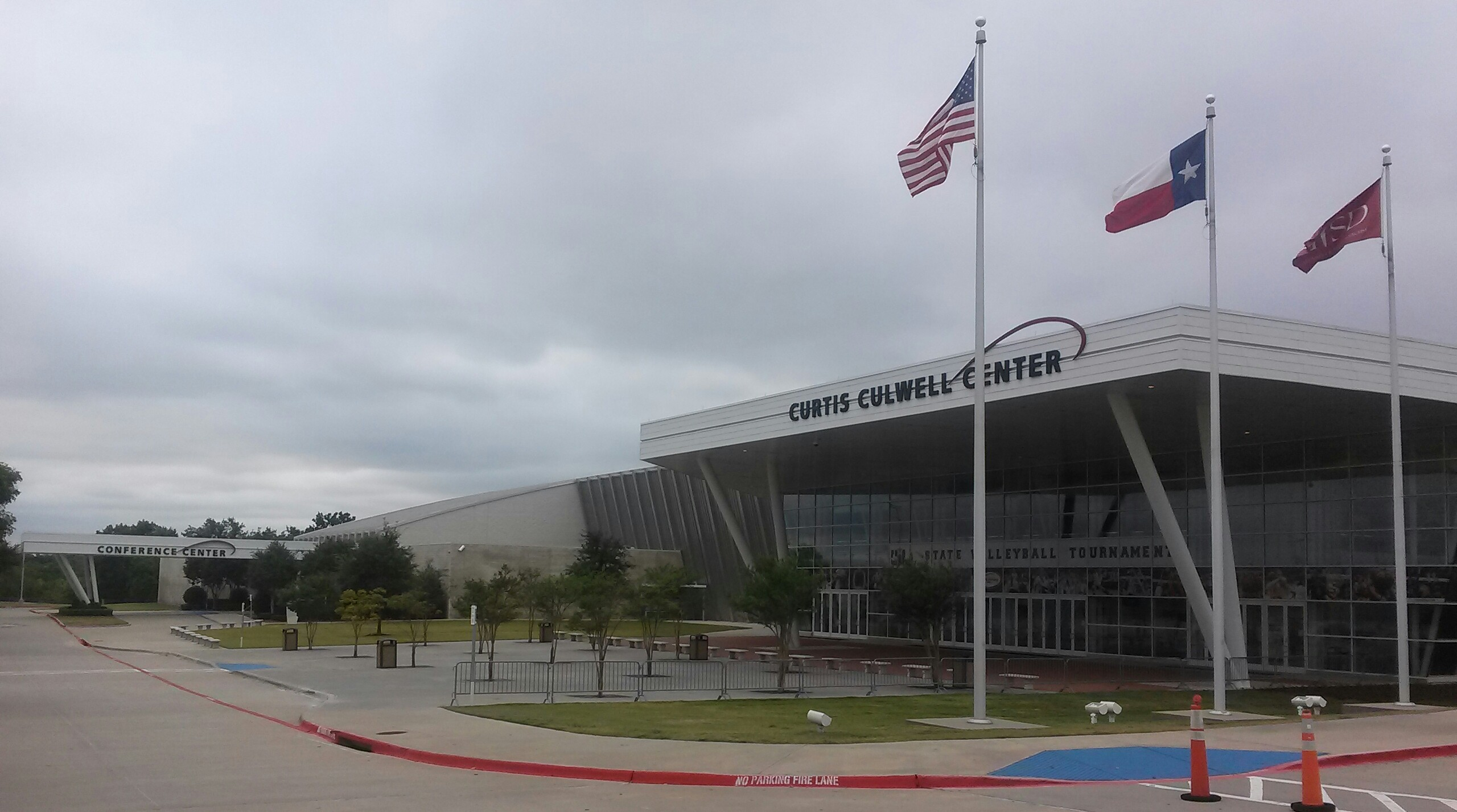
Genesis took place at the Curtis Culwell Center in Garland, Texas.

=== Background ===
In 2013, Total Nonstop Action Wrestling discontinued monthly pay-per-view events in favor of the pre-recorded One Night Only events. Genesis was produced as a PPV from 2005 to 2013, but in 2014, Genesis was televised as an Impact Wrestling television special until 2018. It returned in 2020 as a monthly special for Impact Plus, with the event taking place on January 9, 2021, at Skyway Studios in Nashville, Tennessee. On October 26, 2024, at Bound for Glory, Santino Marella announced that Genesis would return on January 19, 2025, at the Curtis Culwell Center in Garland, Texas.

On October 12, 2025, it was announced that Genesis will be the first TNA PPV in 2026. It will take place in Garland, Texas.

=== Storylines ===
The event featured professional wrestling matches that involved different wrestlers from pre-existing scripted feuds and storylines. Wrestlers portrayed villains, heroes, or less distinguishable characters in scripted events that built tension and culminated in a wrestling match or series of matches.

At Bound for Glory, Frankie Kazarian and Nic Nemeth co-won the Call Your Shot Gauntlet due to a double pin, where they both earned a Call Your Shot Trophy for a title opportunity whenever and wherever they want. Later on that night, Mike Santana would win the TNA World Championship from NXT wrestler Trick Williams. A month later on the November 13 live episode of TNA Impact!, Santana defended the title against Nic's brother Ryan Nemeth when, almost immediately, Nic attempted to utilize his championship opportunity. However, backstage, Nemeth would be attacked by a hooded figure before he could make his entrance. Santana and Ryan would then be attacked by a contingent of NXT wrestlers (Robert Stone, Charlie Dempsey, Channing "Stacks" Lorenzo, Brooks Jensen, Lexis King, and The High Ryze (Tyson Dupont and Tyriek Igwe)); this allowed Kazarian to invoke his championship privilege and defeat Santana to win the championship. Another month later on December 11, Kazarian held his talk show segment, "The King's Speech," when Santana interrupted and announced he was invoking his rematch clause against Kazarian at Genesis and the match was made official later that night. On the January 1, 2026, episode of Impact!, after Kazarian defended the title against Bear Bronson, Santana revealed that Director of Authority Santino Marella had moved their match to the AMC premiere of Thursday Night Impact! on January 15. The following week, the two men had a contract signing for their match, but Nic Nemeth interrupted and implied that following the match, he would invoke his Call Your Shot opportunity. On the AMC debut episode, Santana would defeat Kazarian to win the title back and later fended off Nemeth's attempt to invoke his opportunity. Marella would then come out and declare that Santana and Kazarian would wrestle for the TNA World Championship one more time at Genesis in a Texas Deathmatch. However, newly minted TNA Director of Operations Daria Rae (formerly Sonya Deville in WWE) followed up by making Nemeth the special guest referee.

On the November 13 TNA Impact!, The System (Moose, Brian Myers, JDC, Eddie Edwards, and Alisha Edwards) had an in-ring promo, where JDC, in light of his recent marriage, announced that he would retire from professional wrestling after Genesis. As he helped his fellow stablemates find a suitable replacement, he declared on the December 11 episode that he would face Edwards, who he trained with under Killer Kowalski, in his retirement match at Genesis.

At Final Resolution, after The Hardys (Matt Hardy and Jeff Hardy) retained the TNA World Tag Team Championship, they were soon confronted by The Righteous (Vincent—returning to TNA for after being with the company in 2022–and the debuting Dutch). On the subsequent episode of TNA Impact!, The Righteous again confronted The Hardys in the ring, but said they were only there to show their gratitude, as well as wishing them luck for next week; The Hardys would take part in a 10-man tag team steel cage match as Team TNA (including Santino Marella, Mike Santana, and Steve Maclin) against Team NXT (Channing "Stacks" Lorenzo, Brooks Jensen, Lexis King, and The High Ryze), with The Righteous saying they would be watching. During the match, Matt would enter third for Team TNA but was attacked by Tyriek Igwe before he could enter the cage. The Righteous then came out and abducted Matt from ringside. Two weeks later, The Righteous explained that they only took Matt to help him as a peace offering to him and Jeff. The Hardys refused their advances, but when they returned to their locker room, they found it had been turned into a place of worship by The Righteous, which included photos of their families. On the January 8 TNA Impact!, The Hardys called out The Righteous to fight them then and there, but instead, The Righteous challenged them to a TNA World Tag Team Championship match at Genesis, which TNA would make official.

On the live November 13 TNA Impact!, Elijah, making his first appearance since Bound for Glory and having been out with a torn triceps, held a live in-ring concert; however, he was soon interrupted by Order 4 (Mustafa Ali, Tasha Steelz, The Great Hands (John Skyler and Jason Hotch), and Special Agent 0). Elijah would step up to Ali, with the segment ending as Ali broke Elijah's guitar over his injured arm. A month later at Final Resolution, Order 4 (Ali, Special Agent 0, and The Great Hands) faced The Rascalz (Trey Miguel, Dezmond Xavier, Zachary Wentz, and Myron Reed) in an eight-man tag team match. Towards the end, as Ali retreated into the crowd, Elijah appeared on horseback, hogtying Ali's feet behind his horse before riding off with him. Two weeks later on December 18, Elijah tried to host another concert, but was again interrupted by Ali, accompanied by Steelz and Special Agent 0. The Great Hands, dressed as production crew members, tried to attack Elijah from behind, but were quickly dealt with. When he tried to get to Ali, however, distractions from the rest of Order 4 allowed Ali to hit Elijah again with a guitar. On the January 1, 2026, episode of TNA Impact!, it was announced that Elijah and Ali would face one-on-one at Genesis.

At Turning Point, Rich Swann challenged Leon Slater for the TNA X Division Championship but unfortunately came up short. Despite the loss, Swann showed respect to Slater, shaking his hand after the match. The display didn't sit well with A. J. Francis, Swann's partner in Fir$t Cla$$, as he berated Swann over it the following week on TNA Impact!. Francis would later challenge Slater himself for the X Division Championship at Final Resolution. However, Swann would betray Francis after hitting him with the title belt, allowing Slater to retain while breaking up Fir$t Cla$$. Francis would not let this lie, as he would attack Swann every chance he got, including eliminating Swann from a TNA World Championship number one contender's battle royal despite not being in the match. On the January 8, 2026, episode of TNA Impact!, Francis and Swann were announced to wrestle each other at Genesis.

Since Turning Point, Ryan Nemeth would have several run-ins with Mara Sadé, usually ending with her hitting him with a superkick. Their feud would continue over the next month, including on the Christmas edition of TNA Impact!, where Sadé and Nemeth captained two teams in a ten-person tag team match, with the winners receiving a Christmas bonus; Sadé's team would end up victorious. Despite this, Nemeth would constantly pester Sadé, even trying to flirt with her, but would always be brushed off and eventually kicked in the face. On the AMC debut of Thursday Night Impact! on January 15, TNA would announce that Nemeth and Sadé would face off in an intergender match at Genesis.

==== Changed matches ====
On the December 11 episode of TNA Impact!, Cedric Alexander won a six-man number one contender's match, earning a TNA X-Division Championship match at Genesis against reigning champion, Leon Slater. The following week, the previous champion, Moose, entered the fray by reminding everyone that he never invoked his rematch clause. As such, he put a challenge out to Slater for a title match at Genesis, only for Alexander to take exception. Two weeks later, on the January 1 episode of TNA Impact!, Director of Authority Santino Marella announced a three-way match between Slater, Alexander, and Moose at Genesis for the X Division Championship. However, on the debut of Thursday Night Impact! on AMC on January 15, it was reported that Slater would be unable to travel to the United States due to visa issues and thus unable to defend his title. Former TNA World Champion and current NXT wrestler Joe Hendry, who was announced to appear at Genesis eight days prior, would take his place in the match, with both Alexander and Moose receiving their title opportunities at later dates.

On the December 18 TNA Impact!, Dani Luna called out TNA Knockouts World Champion Léi Yǐng Lee to a future title match, to which Lee accepted. Two weeks later on January 1, while Lee and Xia Brookside were in a tag team match against The Elegance Brand (Heather by Elegance and M by Elegance), Luna pulled Lee from the ring and attacked her, allowing the latter team to pin Brookside for the win. The week after, Luna, now going by the metonym "Doomsday" Dani Luna, defeated Harley Hudson, who, along with Myla Grace, whom accompanied Hudson, she further attacked. Both Lee and Brookside attempted to stop her, but they were all thwarted by Luna, who stood over them holding the Knockouts World Championship belt. Lee and Luna's title match was eventually made official for Genesis. Unfortunately, due to visa issues, Luna would be unable to appear at the event. Thus, on the AMC debut edition of Thursday Night Impact! on January 15, Lee signed an open contract for anyone to challenge her at Genesis. She was then confronted by NXT tag team ZaRuca (Sol Ruca and Zaria), with the latter signing the contract to be Lee's challenger.

== Results ==
No.	Results	Stipulations	Times
1^{P}	Channing "Stacks" Lorenzo (c) (with Arianna Grace) defeated Eric Young, BDE, and KJ Orso by pinfall	Four-way match for the TNA International Championship	6:23
2^{P}	Tessa Blanchard and Mila Moore (with Robert Stone and Victoria Crawford) defeated Indi Hartwell and Vicious Vicki Venuto by pinfall	Tag team match	7:55
3	A. J. Francis defeated Rich Swann by pinfall	Singles match	12:19
4	Mustafa Ali (with Tasha Steelz, John Skyler, Jason Hotch and Special Agent 0) defeated Elijah by pinfall	Singles match	9:35
5	Eddie Edwards defeated JDC by pinfall	Singles match This was JDC's retirement match.	17:16
6	Ryan Nemeth defeated Mara Sadé by pinfall	Intergender match	5:21
7	Léi Yǐng Lee (c) (with Xia Brookside) defeated Zaria (with Sol Ruca) by pinfall	Singles match for the TNA Knockouts World Championship	14:23
8	The Hardys (Matt Hardy and Jeff Hardy) (c) defeated The Righteous (Vincent and Dutch) by pinfall	Tag team match for the TNA World Tag Team Championship	12:40
9	Joe Hendry defeated Cedric Alexander and Moose by pinfall	Three-way match	15:21
10	Mike Santana (c) defeated Frankie Kazarian	Texas Deathmatch for the TNA World Championship; Nic Nemeth was the special guest referee.	19:13
(c) / – the champion(s) heading into the match; P / – the match was broadcast on the pre-show
