= Impact Wrestling Genesis (2021) =

Professional wrestling event produced by Impact Wrestling

Genesis (2021)
- Promotional poster
- Promotion: Impact Wrestling
- Date: January 9, 2021
- City: Nashville, Tennessee
- Venue: Skyway Studios
- Attendance: 0 (behind closed doors) (Note: The event was held without a paying audience due to the COVID-19 pandemic in the United States.)

Impact Plus Monthly Specials chronology
← Previous; Final Resolution	Next → No Surrender

Genesis chronology
← Previous; 2018	Next → 2025

The 2021 Genesis was a professional wrestling event produced by Impact Wrestling. It took place on January 9, 2021, at Skyway Studios in Nashville, Tennessee, and aired exclusively on Impact Plus. It was the 12th event in the Genesis chronology, the first to be held since the 2018 event, and the first purchase-only event since the 2013 event.

Nine matches were contested at the event. In the main event, Willie Mack defeated Moose in an "I Quit" Match. In other prominent matches, Jordynne Grace defeated Jazz and Ace Austin defeated Blake Christian to win the 2021 Super X Cup Tournament.

The event received positive reviews from critics, with much praise being directed to both the Super X Cup final and the "I Quit" main event.

== Production ==
=== Background ===
In 2013, Impact Wrestling (then known as Total Nonstop Action Wrestling) discontinued monthly pay-per-view events in favor of the pre-recorded One Night Only events. Genesis was produced as a PPV from 2005 to 2013, but in 2014, Genesis was televised as an Impact Wrestling television special until 2018. On December 12, 2020, it was revived as a monthly special for Impact Plus, with the event taking place on January 9, 2021, at Skyway Studios in Nashville, Tennessee.

=== Storylines ===
The event featured professional wrestling matches that involve different wrestlers from pre-existing scripted feuds and storylines. Wrestlers portrayed villains, heroes, or less distinguishable characters in scripted events that build tension and culminate in a wrestling match or series of matches.

A main feature of the show was the 2021 Super X Cup tournament, which has been sporadically held in Impact Wrestling since the company's formation in 2002. The winner will receive the Super X Cup trophy, and winning the Super X Cup has historically been portrayed as a stepping stone to becoming a top contender for the Impact X Division Championship. On the December 21 episode of Impact, the brackets were revealed. Competitors included Impact stars (Ace Austin, Cousin Jake, Crazzy Steve, Daivari, and Suicide) and independent wrestlers (Blake Christian, KC Navarro, and Tre Lamar).

At Turning Point, Willie Mack defeated self-proclaimed TNA World Heavyweight Champion Moose by disqualification after Moose repeatedly landed forearm shots on an unconscious Mack after the match. The two have been in a feud that included Mack's best friend, Impact World Champion Rich Swann, who Moose called a "secondary champion". Moose would repeatedly perform the same action of the Turning Point conclusion on Mack, including a No Disqualification match the Impact after Turning Point; and a tag team match on the go-home show before Final Resolution, where Mack and Swann battled Moose and Chris Bey. On the December 15 episode of Impact, Moose, who again called out Swann, instead got Mack. Furious about a referee deciding when he was done, Mack challenged Moose to an "I quit" match so that he decides when he's done. The same night, IMPACT announced via their website that the match will happen at Genesis.

After weeks of trying to find a compatible tag team partner, Jordynne Grace revealed on the November 24 Impact her partner for the Impact Knockouts Tag Team Championship Tournament, former WWE Women's Champion and NWA World Women's Champion Jazz. This would become the start of Jazz's retirement tour going through 2021. The duo would debut as a team on December 1, defeating Killer Kelly and Renee Michelle in the first round, but fell to Havok and Nevaeh on January 4. Backstage, Jazz and Grace would have a talk, with Grace apologizing for having Jazz postpone retirement to fall up short, but Jazz assured her she regrets nothing. Seeing as how Jazz had more to prove, Grace challenged Jazz to a match at Genesis, and Jazz accepted.

== Event ==
Other on-screen personnel
Commentators	Josh Mathews
Commentators	Madison Rayne
Ring announcer	David Penzer
Referees	Brandon Tolle
Referees	Daniel Spencer
Interviewer	Gia Miller

=== Preliminary matches ===
The opening match was a first round bout in the Super X Cup tournament between Ace Austin (with Madman Fulton) and Suicide. Suicide gets the early advantage with side headlocks and a shoulder tackle, with Austin using his signature card to slice Suicide's fingers, but is unaffected due to wearing gloves. Suicide reverses an Irish whip attempt into an Octopus hold on Austin before rolling him up for a near fall. Suicide avoids a dive attempt by Austin, gets distracted by Fulton while attempting his own dive, but goes onto the apron to hit Austin with a rolling senton. Austin sends Suicide into the steel steps and continues the beat down in the ring. Suicide gets the better of Austin with open-palm strikes, avoids a roundhouse kick, and hits a dropkick into the corner for a two count. Austin gets out of Suicide's suplex attempt and hits the springboard roundhouse kick for two, before laying some mounted punches. Suicide delivers an electric chair facebuster followed by a double foot stomp for another two count. Suicide heads up top to hit a diving crossbody that Austin rolls through into a near fall. Suicide counters a tornado DDT into a brainbuster onto Austin for another near fall. Fulton distracts Suicide to allow Austin to hit a knee to the head, followed by "The Fold" to win.

Next, Blake Christian fought against KC Navarro. Both men lock up and push each other into the corner before a clean break. They trade side headlocks and flips in an attempt to one up each other, with Navarro planting strikes on Christian who answers with a wheel kick, followed by a roll-up for two. Christian delivers a snapmare and a dropkick to the head for another two count, forcing Navarro to roll outside the ring. Navarro brings Christian to the outside, and goes back into the ring to hit a suicide dive. Back in the ring, Navarro stomps on Christian before hitting running blows in the corner, followed by a double foot stomp for two. Christian escapes Navarro's submission hold with a donkey kick and lands an enzuigiri, hits a springboard dropkick followed by a 619, and delivers a corkscrew onto the floor. Navarro regains control in the ring, hitting a running punt kick from the apron, and landing a twisting neckbreaker for a near fall. Christian delivers a Death Valley driver and a superkick, followed by a standing shooting star press for another near fall. Navarro catches Christian on the top rope and attempts a superplex, but Christian hits a sunset flip powerbomb and goes back up top to hit "Air Blake" for the win.

The third match saw Cousin Jake against Daivari. Daivari lands some clubbing blows to the back and corner chops, before Jake hits a body block after Daivari runs around him. Jake tosses Daivari out of the ring, and brawls with him at ringside. Jake sets Daivari on the apron, who avoids his charge attempt, and catches his neck on the ropes. Back in the ring, Daivari goes after Jake's neck with chokes and a neckbreaker for two. Daivari keeps Jake grounded with elbows to the neck, a knee to the spine, and a dropkick to the back of the head. Daivari sends Jake to the outside and slams him into the steel steps, but only gets a two count in the ring. Daivari applies a body scissors and a sleeper onto Jake, who elbows his way out of it, but gets chopped in the corner. Jake lands a clothesline on Daivari that has both of them down. Both men rise as Jake hits Daivari with clotheslines and a running spear in the corner, followed by a Michinoku driver for two. Jake lands a sit-out powerbomb on Daivari for a near fall, who answers back with a DDT on Jake for another near fall. Daivari goes after Jake's legs to apply a figure-four leglock, but Jake grabs the ropes. Jake catches Daivari with the Black Hole Slam and advances to the next round.

The fourth and final first round match of the tournament involved Crazzy Steve and Tre Lamar. Lamar gets weirded out by Steve's mind games, where he licks him after a reversal, scares him out of the ring after a rope run fake out and gets spooked by his monkey. Lamar gets back in the ring and lands a Pele kick on Steve, who goes to the outside. Lamar delivers kicks and forearms to Steve both in and out of the ring, and lands a back elbow for two. Lamar stomps on Steve and applies a rear naked choke, before switching to an armbar, and lands a dropkick to the back of the head for a two count. Both men are on the second rope, with Lamar going for a Spanish fly, but Steve hits a side Russian legsweep that takes them both down. They rise to their feet and trade blows, Lamar getting the better of the exchange, but Steve lands another side Russian legsweep into a submission. Lamar misses a springboard crossbody, and Steve lands a diving DDT for the win.

The semi-finals of the tournament began with Ace Austin (with Madman Fulton) taking on Cousin Jake. Jake overpowers Austin throughout the early goings, forcing him to confer with Fulton. Jake lands some clubbing blows on Austin before whipping him into the corner. Austin delivers some strikes of his own, but Jake sends him over the top with Fulton catching Austin in mid-air, and Jake dives on both of them before staring down Fulton. Jake hits a closed fist on Fulton who shruggs it off, allowing Austin to hit a baseball slide and a running dive over the top rope onto Jake. Back in the ring, Austin targets Jake's neck with his knees, and delivers a low dropkick in the corner. Austin continues to knee Jake in the head, but gets taken down after a body block. Austin escapes from Jake's suplex attempt with knees to the head before landing a kick that gives him a two count. Austin applies a front facelock on Jake and delivers knees to the top of his head, but Jake fights out of it and takes Austin down. Austin avoids a powerbomb attempt and applies a crucifix pin on Jake, who escapes and lands a Michinoku driver for two. Jake delivers a clothesline on Austin, who gets thrown into the corner, and avoids a lunge to hit a sunset flip for two. Austin hits Jake with a spinning kick, a tornado kick in the corner, but get caught by Jake who lands a Buckle Bomb, a spear in the corner and the Black Home Slam for a near fall. Both men are on the top rope, Austin kicks Jake to escape a gutwrench move, and hits "The Fold" to advance to the finals.

In the other semi-final round match, Blake Christian went up against Crazzy Steve. Steve consults with his stuffed pet monkey before offering Christian a handshake followed by a hug. The two lock up and trade arm wringers that they both escape from. Christian escapes from a top wrist lock but inadvertently kicks Steve's monkey off the apron, causing him to snap and assault Christian in the corner. Steve hits a snap suplex on Christian who attempts to fight back, but gets taken down with a double underhook suplex for two. Christian gets whipped hard into the corner twice, allowing Steve to go outside to check on his monkey. Back in the ring, Christian hits Steve with a running dropkick in the corner, followed by a split-legged moonsault for two. Christian lands some strikes on Steve, then a snapmare, and a dropkick to the back for another two count. Christian goes up top for another split-legged moonsault, but Steve gets the knees up and lands a senton, before clawing at Christian's ribs. Steve delivers a tilt-a-whirl headscissors that sends Christian outside the ring, they take each other out with a double clothesline, and make it back in the ring before the referee's ten count. Steve hits Christian with some left-handed strikes, a snapmare and a neck twister, and continues the assault with clotheslines, a shoulder block and a running European uppercut in the corner. Steve lands a cannonball senton on Christian for a near fall, who avoids a diving DDT to hit a body scissors into a standing frog splash for another near fall. Steve hits a short arm clothesline on Christian for two, applies the "Upside Down", but gets struck with a knee trying to get in the ring. Christian hangs Steve on the top rope, goes up top himself, and lands the 450° splash for the victory.

The seventh match saw Jazz versus Jordynne Grace. The two show respect to each other, lock up into reversal switches in the corner before shoving each other, and Jazz lays some kicks into Grace. They stand tall after two shoulderblock attempts, but Grace sends Jazz down with a third shoulderblock. Both women are on the apron, Jazz picks at Grace's ankles to drop her onto the apron, who avoids a kick and drops Jazz face first onto the apron as well. Back in the ring, Grace plants Jazz with two snap suplexes, followed by a fisherman suplex for two. Jazz lands a back elbow on a charging Grace, stun guns her across the top rope, and delivers stomps and a leg drop for two. Jazz guillotines Grace under the bottom rope, lands some cross face blows, but only gets a two count after Grace grabs the ropes. Jazz delivers more blows to Grace, who rolls her up for two, and hits a kick for another two count. Jazz lands some headbutts to Grace's spine, they then trade forearms before Jazz stomps on Grace in the corner, then delivers a double underhook suplex for two. Grace trips Jazz and goes for a pin, both get back up their feet, and Grace back drops Jazz to the mat. After trading back forearms, Grace lays Jazz down with a spinebuster for a near fall, then slams her into the corner to hit a running meteora, a running elbow and a Vader Bomb for another near fall. Jazz lands a double chickenwing facebuster on Grace and applies the STF, but Grace is able to grab the ropes. Jazz slingshots Grace into the buckles, goes for some jabs but gets rolled up for two. Grace puts Jazz on the top rope, who fights back and lands a tornado DDT for another two count. Jazz goes for an O'Connor roll but Grace reverses it into her own pin for the victory. The two embrace after the match.

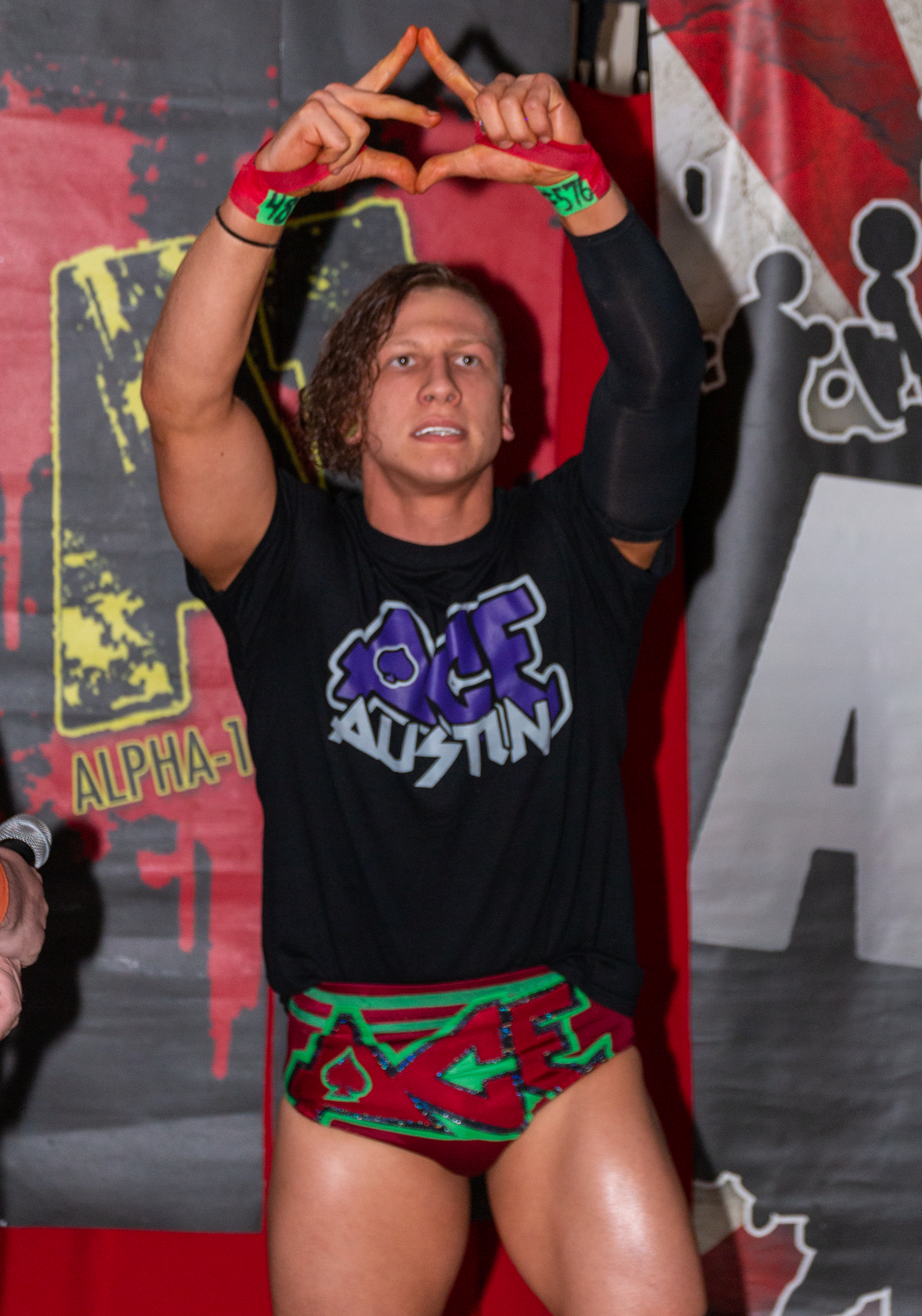
Ace Austin defeated Blake Christian to win the 2021 Super X Cup tournament.

In the penultimate match, Ace Austin and Blake Christian compete in the finals of the Super X Cup tournament. Austin gets the early advantage by working on Christian's arm and using his card between the fingers. Christian lands a hurricanrana and a dropkick on Austin who retreats to the outside. Austin does a side headlock takeover on Christian who applies a head scissors in return, but stays on him with blows in the corner. Christian punches Austin off the apron, misses a springboard moonsault but lands on his feet, and the two start brawling before Christian hits a step-assisted somersault on Austin. Austin gets on the apron to hit a superkick on Christian, and they go back in the ring to trade strikes. Austin rolls up Christian for two, misses a tornado kick but kicks him outside the ring, landing a Fosbury Flop. Back in the ring, Austin lays some stomps and knees to Christian who attempts to fight back. Christian hits Austin with a snapmare into the dropkick, avoids the springboard kick and applies a body scissors into a standing frog splash, then hits a standing shooting star press for two. Austin does a drop toe hold on Christian into the ropes for two, who lands some back elbows and a flying clothesline in return. After an enzuigiri in the corner, Christian DDTs Austin onto the top rope, and hits a sunset flip powerbomb for a near fall. Austin rolls out of the ring, with Christian hitting him with the springboard moonsault, and gets thrown back in the ring before getting planted with a springboard 450° splash for two. Austin catches Christian on the top rope, goes for a superplex attempt but gets hanged up, allowing Christian to hit a double foot stomp for two. Christian drapes Austin over the top rope, goes up top to hit the 450° splash, but Austin avoids it and hits the springboard kick for two. Austin applies a modified Boston half crab on Christian, who manages to grab the ropes to break the hold. They trade spinning kicks and knee blows before Austin lands a kick to Christian's back, who catches him charging with a standing Spanish fly. Christian sends Austin outside the ring, hits his own Fosbury Flop into the Eye of the Hurricane on the entrance ramp. Back in the ring, Christian goes up top to hit the twisting splash but Austin avoids it, who then attempts "The Fold" but gets rolled into an inside cradle for a near fall. They trade pinning predicaments and forearms, with Christian thwarting Austin's signature card trick, but the latter is able to hit "The Fold" to win the 2021 Super X Cup. After the match, Madman Fulton rejoins Austin in the ring, and Impact Executive Vice President Scott D'Amore presents Austin with the Super X Cup trophy.

=== Main event ===
In the main event, Moose took on Willie Mack in an "I Quit" match. The two went back and forth before spilling to the outside. Mack delivers a swinging scoop slam on Moose to the entrance ramp, but he refuses to quit. Moose gets thrown into the ring post twice, but does not quit. Back in the ring, Moose regains control after avoiding a pump kick, and hits a running kick to Mack's head in the corner. Moose delivers more body shots and applies an abdominal stretch on Mack, who does not quit. Mack throws Moose to the outside, who jumps to the apron to prevent a dive attempt, and the two start trading blows before Moose drops Mack's arm on the top rope. At ringside, Moose throws Mack to the barricades on both sides, not caring about his current status. Moose grabs a steel chair and a table from under the ring, setting up the latter near the entrance ramp, but his powerbomb attempt gets countered after Mack grabs both legs and lays punches to the ground. Mack uses the steel chair on Moose both outside and inside the ring, who refuses to quit. Mack wedges the chair in the corner, and throws Moose into it, but does not quit. Mack goes to the top rope and lands two "Six-Star Frog Splashes" to the front and back of Moose, but does not give up. Mack chokes Moose with the chair who refuses to surrender, and places the chair on him before going up top for a third "Six-Star Frog Splash", but gets caught by Moose with a punch. After trading blows, Moose rakes Mack's eyes and plants him with a "Go To Hell" through the table on the outside. Both men slowly get back to their feet and into the ring, trading strikes before Mack and Moose hit a stunner and a headbutt to each other respectively, and the former lays out the latter with a clothesline. Moose hits three uranages on Mack who refuses to quit, and the former goes outside to slide more chairs in the ring. Moose goes to the top rope with a chair, gets stunned by one thrown by Mack who then stacks them in a pile, and delivers a superplex onto said pile of chairs. Both men head to the outside, Mack laying more chair shots to Moose's back, who grabs his TNA World Championship belt and hits Mack in the face. Moose drags Mack back into the ring, and applies mounted elbows before wrapping a chair around his head. Noticing that Mack is knocked out and cannot quit, Moose promises to end his career, before Impact World Champion Rich Swann gets in the ring. Swann tells Moose that he has gone too far and will give him an Impact World title shot in exchange for his friend. Moose says "Thank you. I quit," giving Mack the win.

== Reception ==
Robert Winnfree of 411Mania reviewed the event and gave it a 7 out of 10, which was lower than 2018's event that got a 7.3 out of 10. He praised the Super X Cup final and the "I Quit" match, but felt the show came across as "weekly Impact TV", suffering from pacing and "no connective tissue" to ongoing storylines. Erik Beaston of Bleacher Report praised Moose-Mack for being "a hard-hitting, super physical match" but questioned the logic behind Moose getting his world title opportunity being "a bit convoluted, to say the least." He felt the Super X Cup final was "a great reminder of just how good Austin is this early in his career" and that Christian elevated himself throughout the tournament. In his critique of the Knockouts bout, he found Jazz a bit past her prime but felt she was "pretty damn good" and "showed flashes of the badass former champion" from WWE and the independent circuit, and proclaimed Grace as "a star of the future for Impact or whichever company she may take her talents to." Bob Kapur of Slam Wrestling gave the event 4 out of 5 stars, writing: "[T]his was almost like two shows in one, with the first half underdelivering, and the last three being really strong. Some people will likely criticize the ending of the main event, but it was a good match and it helped drive the plot. And, in the end, that's what these Impact+ specials should be doing – supplementing the weekly TV shows to further angles rather than substituting for PPVs, which should be used for ending them. From that standpoint, it worked well."

== Aftermath ==
Moose would get his Impact World Championship opportunity against Rich Swann in a championship unification match at Sacrifice on March 13. At the event, Moose failed to capture the title.

Ace Austin appeared on the following week's Hard To Kill, demanding to be inserted in the Impact X Division Championship three-way match involving Chris Bey, Rohit Raju and defending champion Manik (TJP). Impact EVP Scott D'Amore denied his request and put him in a match with new signee Matt Cardona instead, losing by disqualification. Austin won his chance on the February 23 and March 2 episodes of Impact!, teaming with Black Taurus and Bey to defeat Josh Alexander, Trey Miguel and Willie Mack; and then defeated his tag partners in a three-way match to get his opportunity at Sacrifice. At the event, Austin defeated TJP to win his second X Division Championship.

KC Navarro would return to the now rebranded TNA on the Countdown to Under Siege pre-show in May 2024, competing against Laredo Kid for the TNA Digital Media Championship in a losing effort. He would later join A. J. Francis and his First Class stable during the Countdown to Emergence pre-show, replacing Rich Swann in the TNA World Tag Team Championship match after Swann's suspension following his second arrest for disorderly intoxication and entering into rehab. Navarro would sign a multi-year contract with the company in October.

The Genesis event would not return until October 26, 2024, at Bound for Glory, when TNA Director of Authority Santino Marella announced it for January 19, 2025, at the Curtis Culwell Center in Garland, Texas.

== Results ==
No.	Results	Stipulations	Times
1	Ace Austin (with Madman Fulton) defeated Suicide	2021 Super X Cup Tournament first round match	10:05
2	Blake Christian defeated KC Navarro	2021 Super X Cup Tournament first round match	9:03
3	Cousin Jake defeated Daivari	2021 Super X Cup Tournament first round match	10:37
4	Crazzy Steve defeated Tre Lamar	2021 Super X Cup Tournament first round match	9:17
5	Ace Austin (with Madman Fulton) defeated Cousin Jake	2021 Super X Cup Tournament semifinal	10:34
6	Blake Christian defeated Crazzy Steve	2021 Super X Cup Tournament semifinal	12:13
7	Jordynne Grace defeated Jazz	Singles match	12:07
8	Ace Austin defeated Blake Christian	2021 Super X Cup Tournament finals	19:52
9	Willie Mack defeated Moose	"I Quit" Match	26:35

=== 2021 Super X Cup ===
First round Genesis; January 9, 2021
Ace Austin	Pinfall
Suicide	10:05
Daivari	10:37
Cousin Jake	Pinfall
Crazzy Steve	Pinfall
Tre Lamar	9:17
Blake Christian	Pinfall
KC Navarro	9:03

Semifinals; Genesis; January 9, 2021
Ace Austin	Pinfall
Cousin Jake	10:34
Crazzy Steve	12:13
Blake Christian	Pinfall

Final; Genesis; January 9, 2021
Ace Austin	Pinfall
Blake Christian	19:52
