= Wayne State Fieldhouse =

Indoor arena in Detroit

- Location within Michigan Location within the United States
- Address: 1290 West Warren Avenue
- Location: Detroit, Michigan
- Coordinates: 42°21′11″N 83°04′39″W
- Owner: Wayne State University
- Capacity: 3,000

Construction
- Opened: November 5, 2021

Tenants
- Wayne State Warriors (NCAA) (2021–present); Motor City Cruise (NBAGL) (2021–present)

Wayne State Fieldhouse is a multi-purpose arena in Detroit. It serves as the home of the Wayne State Warriors (NCAA Division II) men's and women's basketball teams and the Motor City Cruise of the NBA G League. The arena is owned by Wayne State University.

== History ==
On May 1, 2019, Wayne State University entered into a partnership with the Detroit Pistons to construct a new arena. The $25 million arena would be constructed near the corner of Trumbull and Warren Avenues. The Pistons' desire to bring their NBA G League affiliate closer to home was a factor in their decision since their affiliate, the Grand Rapids Drive, played 150 miles (240 km) west of Detroit. There were discussions about bringing the Drive to Detroit, but the Drive's ownership indicated that it preferred to stay in the Grand Rapids area. The Pistons then purchased an existing G League franchise from the Phoenix Suns, the Northern Arizona Suns, and relocated the team to Detroit as the Motor City Cruise in 2021.

Xtreme Fighting Championships held the XFC Detroit Grand Prix, the first mixed martial arts card at the arena, on June 2, 2023, headlined by John Lopez vs. Matt Lagou.

On March 28, 2024, Wayne State Fieldhouse held Big Time Boxing USA: Carrillo vs. Rankin, with Juan Carrillo defeating Quinton Rankin via TKO in the main event match.

TNA Wrestling held their Bound for Glory pay-per-view event at the arena on October 26, 2024, followed by the tapings of future episodes of their weekly shows Impact! and Xplosion the next day, making these two events the first professional wrestling shows that the Wayne State Fieldhouse has hosted.

== Controversy ==
The partnership between Wayne State and the Pistons was negotiated in secret at the request of the Pistons, contrary to the Open Meeting Laws that govern all publicly elected officials in the state of Michigan (members of the Wayne State Board of Governors are publicly elected in statewide partisan elections). Plans for Wayne State Fieldhouse were announced less than 12 hours before the University Board met to sign the contract. At the meeting, the arena was the first agenda item followed immediately by a university press conference announcing the partnership. There was no time provided for public comment despite the arena's location in a dense residential neighborhood.
