= TNA Genesis (2005) =

2005 Total Nonstop Action Wrestling pay-per-view event

Genesis (2005)
- The promotional poster for the event featuring Jeff Hardy
- Promotion: Total Nonstop Action Wrestling (TNA)
- Date: November 13, 2005
- City: Orlando, Florida
- Venue: Impact Zone
- Attendance: 900

Pay-per-view chronology
← Previous; Bound for Glory	Next → Turning Point

Genesis chronology
← Previous; First	Next → 2006

The 2005 Genesis was a professional wrestling pay-per-view (PPV) event produced by Total Nonstop Action Wrestling (TNA) promotion that took place on November 13, 2005 at the Impact Zone in Orlando, Florida. It was the first event under the Genesis name and eleventh event in the 2005 TNA PPV schedule. Seven professional wrestling matches and two pre-show matches were featured on the event's card, one of which involved a championship.

The main event was a Six Man Tag Team match pitting the team of Rhino and Team 3D (Brother Ray and Brother Devon) against the team of Jeff Jarrett and America's Most Wanted (Chris Harris and James Storm). Rhino and Team 3D won the encounter. The TNA X Division Championship was defended by then-champion A.J. Styles against the challenger Petey Williams at the event. Styles defeated Williams to retain the championship. A No Disqualification match between Abyss and Sabu was held at the show. Abyss won the contest. A match to determine the number-one contender to the NWA World Heavyweight Championship took place at Genesis, in which Monty Brown defeated Jeff Hardy for a future title match.

Genesis is remembered for the debut of Christian Cage. It was also dedicated to World Wrestling Entertainment (WWE) wrestler Eddie Guerrero, who died the day of the show. Cage's debut was ranked by TNA as the 5th greatest moment in the company's history. Corey David Lacroix of the professional wrestling section of the Canadian Online Explorer rated the show an 8 out of 10, higher than the 2006 edition of 5 out of 10 by Bob Kapur.

== Production ==
=== Background ===
Genesis was announced in early-August 2005 on TNA's official website. It was planned for November 13 at the TNA Impact! Zone in Orlando, Florida. This event caused a change in TNA's PPV schedule, as the November 2004 PPV event was titled Victory Road. This was a small change as TNA intended to stick with the other names used for PPVs throughout 2005. A promotional poster for the event was released prior by TNA featuring Jeff Hardy. TNA created a section covering the event on their website. A thirty-minute pre-show was slatted to take place prior to the telecast featuring two wrestling matches: Shark Boy versus the debuting Nigel McGuinness, and The Diamonds in the Rough (David Young, Elix Skipper, and Simon Diamond) versus Lance Hoyt and The Naturals (Andy Douglas and Chase Stevens). TNA promoted the debut of a newly signed wrestler to occur at Genesis, which the promotion called a "major acquisition." Genesis was dedicated to World Wrestling Entertainment wrestler Eddie Guerrero, who died the day of the event.

=== Storylines ===
Genesis featured seven professional wrestling matches and two pre-show matches that involved different wrestlers from pre-existing scripted feuds and storylines. Wrestlers portrayed villains, heroes, or less distinguishable characters in the scripted events that built tension and culminated in a wrestling match or series of matches.

The main event at Genesis was a Six Man Tag Team match pitting the team of Rhino and Team 3D (Brother Ray & Brother Devon) against the team of Jeff Jarrett and America's Most Wanted (Chris Harris & James Storm; AMW). This match was promoted for Genesis by TNA on their official website, and later announced on the October 29 episode of TNA's television program TNA Impact!. The storyline behind this match began the October 1 episode of Impact!, when Team 3D made their TNA debut. On the October 8 episode of Impact!, AMW and Jarrett assaulted Team 3D to the point they were left covered in blood. Afterwards, Team 3D were not seen due to a scripted injury, with Jarrett, AMW, and Team Canada (A-1, Bobby Roode, Eric Young, Petey Williams, and Coach Scott D'Amore) hosting a segment where they buried Team 3D's careers on the October 15 episode of Impact!. Meanwhile, then-NWA World Heavyweight Champion Jarrett was involved in a feud with Kevin Nash which was to lead to a title defense at TNA's Bound for Glory PPV event on October 23. However, Nash was rushed to the hospital the night before and was not cleared to wrestle. Rhino took Nash's place in the match, where he defeated Jarrett to win the NWA World Heavyweight Championship. The same night Team 3D made their return from their scripted injury, coming to the aid of Rhino after the main event. Later, Jarrett reclaimed the title on the November 3 episode of Impact!.

The premier bout on the card was for the TNA X Division Championship, in which then-champion A.J. Styles defended the title against the challenger Petey Williams. At Bound for Glory, Williams competed in a Three Way Ultimate X match to determine the number-one contender to the TNA X Division Championship along with Chris Sabin and Matt Bentley. The match had technical difficulties, but in the end Williams won the bout. On the October 29 episode of Impact!, a rematch from Bound for Glory was promoted for the November 3 episode of Impact! due to the issues regarding the previous contest. Despite the rematch, Williams won this encounter as well, remaining number-one contender. After his victory, TNA began to promote Styles versus Williams in a title match at Genesis.

Several other bouts were planned for Genesis, of these the most significant were a No Disqualification match and a match to determine the number-one contender to the NWA World Heavyweight Championship. The No Disqualification match was between Abyss and Sabu. This was a rematch from TNA's Unbreakable PPV event on September 11, which Abyss won. Abyss and Sabu also fought in Monster's Ball II at Bound for Glory, which Rhino won. TNA advertised Monty Brown versus Jeff Hardy to determine the number-one contender to the NWA World Heavyweight Championship heading into Genesis. This was a continuation of a storyline in which Brown sought to become NWA World Heavyweight Champion. Both of these encounters were advertised on TNA's website following Bound for Glory.

== Event ==
Other on-screen personnel
Role:	Name:
Commentator	Mike Tenay
Commentator	Don West
Ring announcer	Jeremy Borash
Referee	Rudy Charles
Referee	Mark "Slick" Johnson
Referee	Andrew Thomas
Interviewers	Jeremy Borash
Interviewers	Shane Douglas

=== Pre-show ===
Prior to Genesis, TNA held a thirty-minute pre-show. Two matches were held during the broadcast. The first pitted Shark Boy against Nigel McGuinness, lasting 5 minutes and 30 seconds. Shark Boy won the encounter by using a roll-up pin. The second was a Six Man Tag Team match between The Diamonds in the Rough (David Young, Elix Skipper, and Simon Diamond) and the team of Lance Hoyt and The Naturals (Andy Douglas and Chase Stevens). The duration of the contest was 5 minutes and 48 seconds. The Diamonds in the Rough won after Skipper and Young crashed into Stevens simultaneously and followed with the pinfall.

=== Miscellaneous ===
Genesis featured employees other than the wrestlers involved in the matches. Mike Tenay and Don West were the commentators for the telecast. Jeremy Borash was the ring announcer for the event. Andrew Thomas, Rudy Charles, and Mark "Slick" Johnson participated as referees for the encounters. Shane Douglas handled the interview duties during the show. Besides employees who appeared in a wrestling role, SoCal Val, Larry Zbyszko, Cassidy Riley, Coach Scott D'Amore, Christian Cage, Traci, James Mitchell, and Gail Kim all appeared on camera, either in backstage or in ringside segments. During the broadcast, Christian Cage made his TNA debut, revealing himself as the major acquisition which TNA promoted for the event.

=== Preliminary matches ===
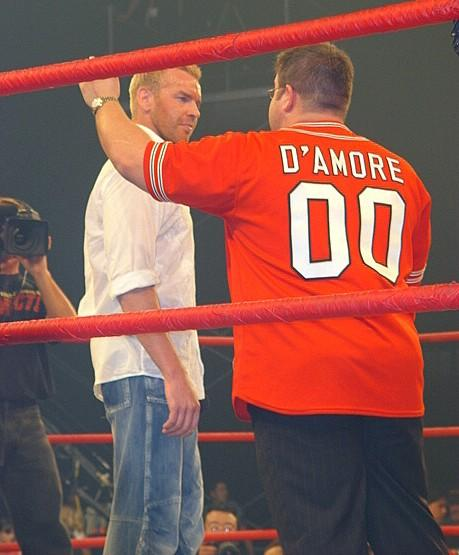
Christian Cage (left), during his debut at Genesis with Coach Scott D'Amore (right)

The first match of the event pitted Raven against P.J. Polaco. This match occurred because Raven refused to quit the company, which was something NWA Championship Committee member Larry Zbyszko had requested in the storyline. Since Raven refused to quit, Zbyszko forced him to wrestle Polaco. Cassidy Riley interfered in the match by attempting to aid Raven. The duration of the bout was 5 minutes and 45 seconds. Raven won the contest by forcing Polaco's head into the mat with his signature Even Flow DDT maneuver.

A Six Man Tag Team Hockey Stick Fight with Kip James as Special Guest Referee between 3Live Kru (B.G. James, Konnan, and Ron Killings) and Team Canada (A-1, Bobby Roode, and Eric Young) followed. In this match, hockey sticks were hung above each of the turnbuckles in the ring, with only the legal men allowed to use them. The only way to win was by pinfall or submission. Killings pinned Young after a top rope leg drop onto a hockey stick that laid across Young's groin to win the match for his team at 10 minutes and 23 seconds. After this bout, Christian Cage made his debut, announcing he wanted to become NWA World Heavyweight Champion. Coach Scott D'Amore and Bobby Roode came out and offered Cage a spot in Team Canada, which Cage said he would consider.

The third match was between Monty Brown and Jeff Hardy to determine the number-one contender to the NWA World Heavyweight Championship. Hardy scored a two-count on Brown by slamming the back of Brown's head and neck into the mat with a reverse neckbreaker. Hardy then climbed to the top rope and jumped off with a somersault toward Brown, who was lying on his back in the ring, to attempt his signature Swanton Bomb maneuver. Once Hardy jumped, Brown moved out of the way and then performed his signature Pounce maneuver by crashing into Hardy. Brown followed by pinning Hardy at 8 minutes and 43 seconds to win the contest and become number-one contender to the NWA World Heavyweight Championship.

TNA held a Four-on-Four Tag Team Elimination X match pitting the team of Alex Shelley, Christopher Daniels, Roderick Strong, and Samoa Joe against the team of Austin Aries, Chris Sabin, Matt Bentley, and Sonjay Dutt. Matt Bentley was accompanied by Traci to the ring. The duration of this bout was 23 minutes and 15 seconds. Daniels took over the leadership role of his team, naming them Team Ministry. In this match, each person from each team had to be eliminated by pinfall or submission until all members of one team were gone. The wrestler(s) that remained won the bout for their team. Strong was the first eliminated after being pinned by Aries following a 450° aerial splash. Aries was eliminated soon-after by Daniels, who pinned him with a roll-up while he was distracted by Joe. The third elimination was Dutt, who submitted to Shelley's signature Border City Stretch submission hold. Not long after, Shelley was pinned by Bentley after being kicked in the face. Joe forced Bentley to submit with his signature Coquina Clutch submission hold, bringing the match down to Daniels and Joe versus Sabin. Daniels won the bout for his team by pinning Sabin after slamming Sabin face-first into the mat with his signature Angel's Wings maneuver. An argument ensued between Daniels and Joe after the contest, with Joe angry in the storyline that Daniels eliminated Sabin when he wanted to instead. This led to Joe attacking Daniels and bashing him over the head with a steal chair. Joe followed up by slamming Daniels into the mat with his signature Muscle Buster maneuver and then a second time on a steal chair. This left Daniels bloodied in the center of the ring with TNA's medical crew tending to his injuries.

=== Main event matches ===
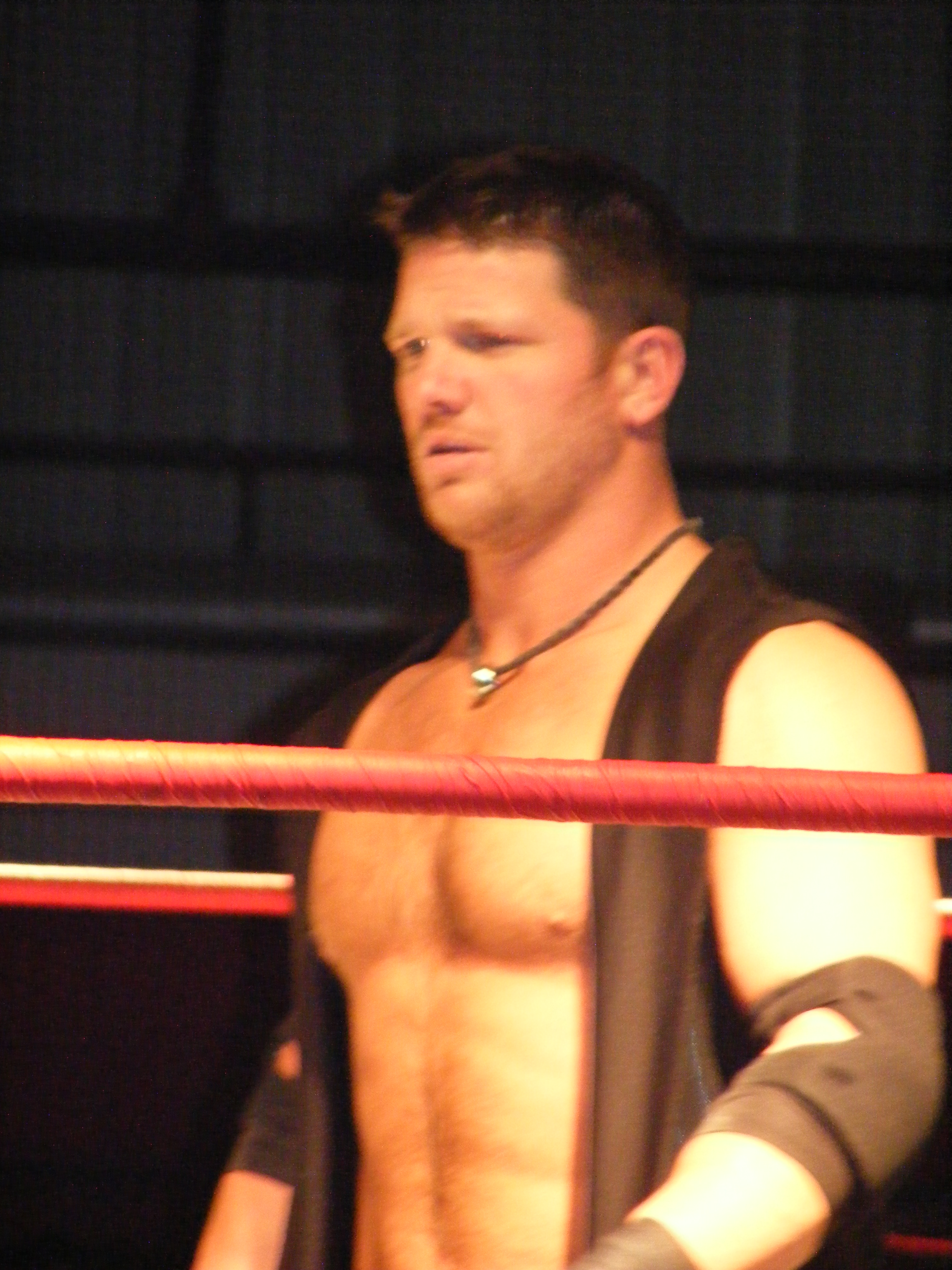
A.J. Styles (pictured) defeated Petey Williams to retain the TNA X Division Championship at Genesis.

The fifth match of the show saw Abyss face Sabu in a No Disqualification match. Abyss was accompanied by James Mitchell. In a No Disqualification match, weapons are legal, as well as outside interference, with a victor determined only by pinfall or submission. Abyss slammed Sabu into a pile of thumbtacks to earn a two-count during the match. Near the end, Sabu tried to hit Abyss with a steal chair wrapped in barbed-wire, but Abyss countered the maneuver. This led to Abyss slamming Sabu back-first onto the barbed-wire wrapped steal chair with his signature Black Hole Slam maneuver to win the encounter at 10 minutes and 48 seconds.

The TNA X Division Championship was defended by A.J. Styles against Petey Williams next. Williams was accompanied by A-1. The duration of the contest was 18 minutes and 20 seconds. Early in the bout, Styles jumped over the top rope to ringside aiming to land on Williams, he instead overshot and crashed into the guardrail. Mid-way through the contest, Styles attempted to perform his signature Styles Clash maneuver, but Williams countered. Afterwards, Williams attempted to perform his signature Canadian Destroyer, but this time Styles counter. Williams held Styles in his signature Sharpshooter submission hold during the encounter. Styles fought out of it by grabbing the bottom rope and forcing it to be released. Samoa Joe interfered in the bout by distracting Styles. Near the end, both men fought on the top rope with Styles getting the advantage. He then set up Williams for his Styles Clash maneuver and jumped off, slamming Williams face-first into the mat from the top rope. Styles followed with a pin, thus winning the match and retaining the TNA X Division Championship.

The main event was a Six-man tag team match pitting the team of Rhino and Team 3D against the team of Jeff Jarrett and America's Most Wanted. The latter was accompanied by Gail Kim. Various weapons were used by both teams throughout the match without the referee disqualifying either. Some weapons used included trash cans, cheese graters, and tables. Rhino tackled Jarrett with his signature Gore maneuver late in the match, but the pin was broken up by AMW. This led to Team 3D throwing Harris out of the ring and performing their signature 3D tag team maneuver, slamming Storm onto the mat. They followed with the pin to win the contest at 15 minutes and 48 seconds. After the contest, Jarrett attacked Rhino by bashing him over the head with a guitar. Jarrett, AMW, and Team Canada then proceeded to assault Rhino and Team 3D until Christian Cage came out to the ring. Cage attacked Coach Scott D'Amore and aided Rhino and Team 3D is fighting off Jarrett, AMW, and the rest of Team Canada.

== Reception ==
A total of 900 people attended Genesis. Canadian Online Explorer writer Corey David Lacroix rated the entire event an 8 out of 10, which was higher than the 2006 edition with 5 out of 10 from Bob Kapur. The Genesis ranking was lower than Bound for Glory's rating, which received a 9 out of 10 from Bob Kapur. TNA's next PPV event Turning Point was ranked lower than Genesis; it received a 7 out of 10 from Bob Kapur. Genesis was ranked higher than TNA's Victory Road held the previous November. Victory Road was given a 5 out of 10 from Jason Clevett. Compared to rival World Wrestling Entertainment's (WWE) Survivor Series PPV event, Genesis out-performed it, as it was given a 6.5 out of 10 by Dale Plummer and Nick Tylwalk.

Lacroix rated the main event Six Man Tag Team match an 8 out of 10, while the No Disqualification match was given a 7.5 out of 10. The TNA X Division Championship match and the Elimination X match each received the highest rating of Lacroix's review with a 9 out of 10. He gave the Monty Brown versus Jeff Hardy bout a 6 out of 10, while the Raven versus P.J. Polaco match a 4.5 out of 10, the lowest rating of his review. He also gave Christian Cage's debut an 8 out of 10.

James Caldwell of the Pro Wrestling Torch Newsletter reviewed the event, commenting that the main event was the "usual shortcut main event match involving Jarrett or anyone with an ECW background." He said the TNA X Division Championship match was a "solid match" and was the "match of the night so far, although not a typical standout X Division PPV match." Caldwell's called the No Disqualification match the "usual trainwreck hardcore match between two wrestlers who have wrestled the exact same match several PPV's in a row." He felt the Elimination X match was a decent wrestling match" and that the segment after the match helped to establish "Joe's character and gave him some definition as an assassin." As for the Brown versus Hardy match, he stated that it was a "better match than the previous two, but there wasn't enough time for the match to develop a nice pace and cadence to be a solid PPV quality match."

TNA released a DVD counting down the top 50 moments in their history in 2007, with Cage's debut being ranked at number 5 on the compilation.

== Aftermath ==
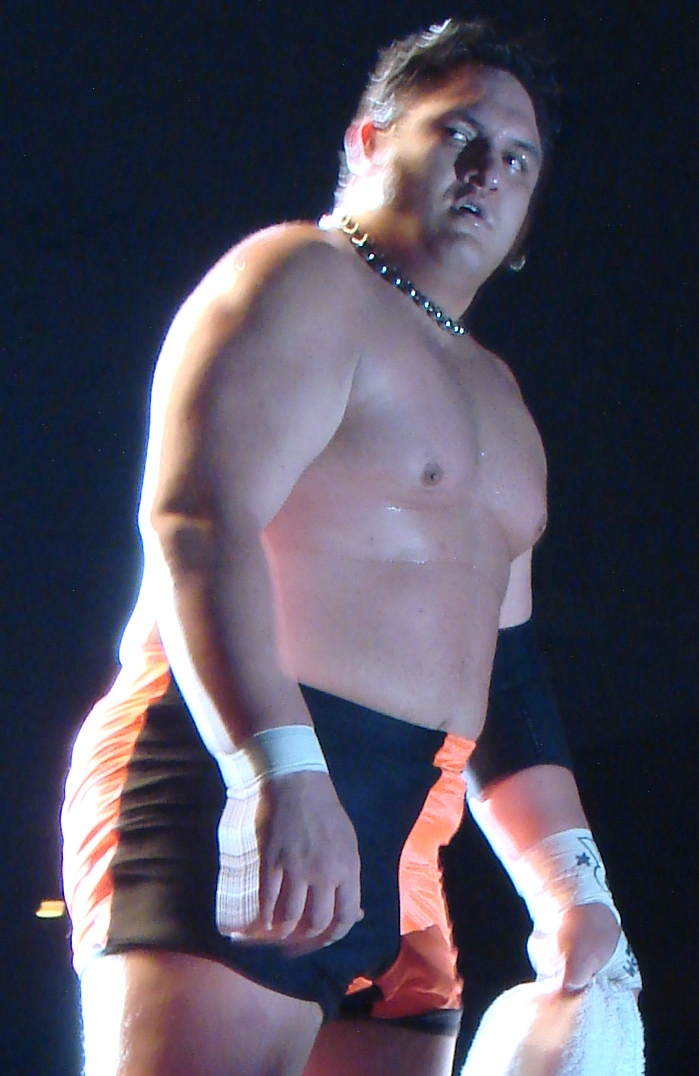
Samoa Joe (pictured) defeated A.J. Styles to win the TNA X Division Championship at Turning Point.

After the show went off the air, Christian Cage, Rhino, and Team 3D joined to create a chant in honor of Eddie Guerrero.

Rhino and Jarrett continued their rivalry after Genesis. A rematch between Rhino and Jarrett for the NWA World Heavyweight Championship was announced on the November 19 episode of Impact! for Turning Point. TNA aired a series of video packages focusing on Rhino and his title match heading into the show. Jarrett defeated Rhino at the event to retain the championship.

Team 3D fought AMW in a Tag Team Elimination Tables match at Turning Point. The Tables match was announced on the November 19 episode of Impact! to take place at the show. Team 3D won the encounter at the show.

A.J. Styles went on to defend the TNA X Division Championship against Samoa Joe at Turning Point. This defense was due to Styles accusing Joe of violating the unwritten X Division code. Styles then challenged Joe to a TNA X Division Championship match at Turning Point which Joe accepted on the November 19 episode of Impact!. Joe defeated Styles at the show to become the new TNA X Division Champion. After the bout, Joe attempted to assault Styles in the same manner he did with Daniels until Daniels returned from injury to save Styles. This continued a rivalry between the three wrestlers as Joe went on to defend the title against Daniels at TNA's Final Resolution PPV event on January 15, 2006, which Joe won to retain the title. At TNA's Against All Odds PPV event on February 12, 2006, Daniels, Joe, and Styles competed in a Three Way match for the TNA X Division Championship; Joe gained the pinfall to retain the title. The three competed again, but this time in a Three Way Ultimate X match for the championship at TNA's Destination X PPV event on March 12, 2006. Daniels won the bout, thus becoming the new TNA X Division Champion. The rivalry ended on the April 13, 2006 episode of Impact! when Joe defeated Daniels to win back the championship.

After Monty Brown became number-one contender to the NWA World Heavyweight Championship, he face Christian Cage at Turning Point in another bout to determine the number-one contender to the title. Cage requested this match on the November 26 episode of Impact! from NWA Championship Committee member Larry Zbyszko, which he was granted. Cage won the contest to become the new number-one contender NWA World Heavyweight Championship.

TNA held the first-ever Barbed Wire Massacre at Turning Point between Abyss and Sabu. TNA advertised the Barbed Wire Massacre between Abyss and Sabu on the November 19 episode of Impact!. The reasoning behind the match stipulation had to do with Abyss fearing barbed wire in the storyline. Abyss challenged this fear on the December 3 episode of Impact!, by bashing Sabu over the head with a barbed wire wrapped steal chair. Sabu defeated Abyss at the event to end their rivalry.

== Results ==
No.	Results	Stipulations	Times
1^{P}	Shark Boy defeated Nigel McGuinness	Singles match	5:30
2^{P}	The Diamonds in the Rough (David Young, Elix Skipper and Simon Diamond) defeated Lance Hoyt and The Naturals (Andy Douglas and Chase Stevens)	Six-man tag team match	5:48
3	Raven defeated P.J. Polaco	Singles match	5:45
4	3Live Kru (B.G. James, Konnan and Ron Killings) defeated Team Canada (A-1, Bobby Roode and Eric Young)	Hockey Stick Fight with Kip James as Special Guest Referee	10:23
5	Monty Brown defeated Jeff Hardy	Singles match to determine the #1 contender to the NWA World Heavyweight Championship	8:43
6	Team Ministry (Alex Shelley, Christopher Daniels, Roderick Strong, and Samoa Joe) defeated Austin Aries, Chris Sabin, Matt Bentley (with Traci), and Sonjay Dutt^{1}	Elimination X match	23:15
7	Abyss (with James Mitchell) defeated Sabu	No Disqualification match	10:48
8	A.J. Styles (c) defeated Petey Williams (with A-1)	Singles match for the TNA X Division Championship	18:20
9	Rhino and Team 3D (Brother Ray and Brother Devon) defeated Jeff Jarrett and America's Most Wanted (Chris Harris and James Storm) (with Gail Kim)	Six-man tag team match	15:48
(c) / – the champion(s) heading into the match; P / – the match was broadcast on the pre-show

Elimination X match

1.

Elimination No.	Eliminated	Eliminator	Notes	Time
1	Roderick Strong	Austin Aries	Aries pinned Strong after a 450° aerial splash.	12:02
2	Austin Aries	Christopher Daniels	Daniels pinned Aries with a roll-up pin.	12:23
3	Sonjay Dutt	Alex Shelley	Shelley forced Dutt to submit with his signature Border City Stretch submission hold.	15:13
4	Alex Shelley	Matt Bentley	Bentley pinned Shelley after a kick to the face.	15:53
5	Matt Bentley	Samoa Joe	Joe forced Bentley to submit with his signature Coquina Clutch submission hold.	20:40
6	Chris Sabin	Christopher Daniels	Daniels pinned Sabin after slamming him face-first into the mat with his signature Angel's Wings maneuver.	23:15
