= The Pinnacle (music venue) =

Concert venue located in Nashville, Tennessee

- Interactive map of The Pinnacle
- Address: 910 Exchange Lane
- Location: Nashville, Tennessee, U.S.
- Coordinates: 36°9′36.7128″N 86°47′4.956″W
- Owner: AEG Presents
- Capacity: 4,500
- Type: Music venue

Construction
- Opened: February 27, 2025

Website
- Official website

The Pinnacle is a 4,500-seat concert venue located in the Nashville Yards complex in Nashville, Tennessee owned and operated by AEG Presents.

== History ==
On January 30, 2024, AEG Presents and Southwest Value Partners announced that they would be constructing a state-of-the-art music venue in the Nashville Yards complex in Nashville, Tennessee with an opening date slated for 2025. On September 17, 2024, AEG announced the first concerts to take place at the venue which would include artists such as the country music band, The Turnpike Troubadours, the San Francisco-based rock band Journey, rapper and record producer T-Pain, country pop singer-songwriter Russell Dickerson, electronic music duo Zeds Dead, and more. It was also announced that the venue would open in February 2025.

The venue opened to the public on February 27, 2025 with the first performer being Kacey Musgraves. On March 8, 2025, metalcore rock band Killswitch Engage held the first night of their North American tour at the venue.

On November 26, 2025, the venue held its first professional wrestling event as All Elite Wrestling (AEW) presented a live special Thanksgiving Eve broadcast of its weekly television show Dynamite followed by a Thanksgiving taping of Collision.

On February 13, 2026, Total Nonstop Action Wrestling held their No Surrender TNA+ special event at the venue which featured Mike Santana and Leon Slater fighting against Nic Nemeth and Eddie Edwards in a tag team match as the main event.
