= TNA Genesis (2025) =

2025 professional wrestling event produced by Total Nonstop Action Wrestling

Genesis
- Promotional poster featuring various TNA wrestlers
- Promotion: Total Nonstop Action Wrestling
- Date: January 19, 2025
- City: Garland, Texas
- Venue: Curtis Culwell Center
- Attendance: 4,032

Pay-per-view chronology
| ← Previous; Bound for Glory | Next → Sacrifice |

Genesis chronology
| ← Previous; 2021 | Next → 2026 |

The 2025 edition of Genesis was a professional wrestling pay-per-view (PPV) event produced by Total Nonstop Action Wrestling (TNA). It took place on January 19, 2025, at the Curtis Culwell Center in Garland, Texas. It was the thirteenth event under the Genesis chronology, and the first to be held since the 2021 event. The event also featured wrestlers from WWE's NXT brand.

Ten matches were contested at the event, including two on the pre-show. In the main event, Joe Hendry defeated Nic Nemeth to win the TNA World Championship. In other prominent matches, Tessa Blanchard defeated Jordynne Grace and Mike Santana defeated Josh Alexander in an "I Quit" match. This event was notable for the appearance of NXT wrestlers Ashante "Thee" Adonis, Nathan Frazer, Axiom, and Cora Jade.

== Production ==
=== Background ===
In 2013, Total Nonstop Action Wrestling discontinued monthly pay-per-view events in favor of the pre-recorded One Night Only events. Genesis was produced as a PPV from 2005 to 2013, but in 2014, Genesis was televised as an Impact Wrestling television special until 2018. It returned in 2020 as a monthly special for Impact Plus, with the event taking place on January 9, 2021, at Skyway Studios in Nashville, Tennessee.

On October 26, 2024, at Bound for Glory, Santino Marella announced that Genesis would return on January 19, 2025, at the Curtis Culwell Center in Garland, Texas.

On January 16, 2025, TNA announced NXT taking part in the Genesis pay-per-view under the official partnership between WWE and TNA.

=== Storylines ===
The event featured professional wrestling matches that involved different wrestlers from pre-existing scripted feuds and storylines. Wrestlers portrayed villains, heroes, or less distinguishable characters in scripted events that built tension and culminated in a wrestling match or series of matches.

At Bound for Glory, Nic Nemeth retained the TNA World Championship over Joe Hendry after an intervention from John Layfield. Since then, Hendry vowed to work his way back to a world title opportunity, albeit with his relationship with Nemeth being further strained due to miscommunications. Two months later at Final Resolution, Hendry defeated Josh Alexander, Mike Santana, and Steve Maclin in a four-way match to earn a TNA World Championship match at Genesis. Later that night, Nemeth retained the title over A. J. Francis, making a rematch between himself and Hendry official for Genesis.

On the January 2, 2025 episode of Impact!, after Ace Austin defeated Kushida, Austin spoke to and thanked the crowd for their support of his tag team partner Chris Bey, who suffered a legitimate neck injury at the October 27 Impact! tapings. Austin then announced intentions to challenge for the TNA World Championship after having been encouraged by Bey, which drew the attention of TNA X Division Champion Moose. Moose claimed that Austin should be challenging him for the "top title" in TNA, as he saw it, and one that Austin had held previously. Moose continued to goad Austin when he was about to bring up Bey, to which a furious Austin demanded a title match then and there. TNA Director of Authority Santino Marella then emerged reneging on Austin's demand, but would announce that Austin will instead challenge Moose for the X Division Championship at Genesis. However, on the following week's episode, Moose and Alisha Edwards disavowed the current X Division Championship belt for its perceived "ugliness," and promised to debut a new belt at Genesis.

Josh Alexander and Mike Santana competed in the TNA World Championship #1 contender's four-way match at Final Resolution, during which Alexander zip tied Santana to a railing, preventing him from further action. Three weeks later on Impact!, Santana was in the ring as he looked back on that match while reaffirm his desire to not only win the TNA World Championship, but also become the new "standard" of TNA. This drew the ire of The Northern Armory (Alexander, Judas Icarus, and Travis Williams), as Alexander was once referred to by such a moniker. They interrupted to rag on Santana for his shortcomings after leaving TNA, to which Santana rebutted by saying that Alexander's success was due to sucking up to management. This led to a gauntlet match the following week between Santana and all three members of The Northern Armory, which Santana won by disqualification when the stable beat him down once he had gotten to Alexander. TNA would go on to announce a match between Alexander and Santana set for Genesis. One the following week's episode, The Northern Armory came out to proclaim that Alexander's match with Santana wouldn't take place due to the attack they committed on the latter the previous week. However, Santana would quickly interrupt the trio to not only confirm the match would happen but also challenge Alexander to make it an "I Quit" match at Genesis. Alexander would accept, proclaiming that he would shake Santana's hand if he won.

At Final Resolution, former CMLL wrestler Tessa Blanchard made her return to TNA after over four years away, attacking Jordynne Grace during her match with Rosemary. When asked about her actions shortly after by backstage reporter Gia Miller, Blanchard declared she returned to remind people that she was the reason for the success of the Knockouts division rather than people like Grace. Blanchard would reappear on the January 2 episode of Impact!, again attacking Grace after a ten-woman tag team match. She then dragged Grace by her luggage and tossed her out of the arena, telling her to get out of "her" division. The following week, Grace called Blanchard to meet her in the ring, which she did later that night leading to a wild brawl. TNA would then announce that, during the commercial break, Santino Marella announced that Grace and Blanchard would face off at Genesis, in Blanchard's first TNA match in five years.

== Results ==
| No. | Results | Stipulations | Times |
|---|---|---|---|
| 1^{P} | Jake Something defeated Ashante "Thee" Adonis by pinfall | Singles match | 3:55 |
| 2^{P} | Frankie Kazarian defeated Leon Slater by pinfall | Singles match | 9:10 |
| 3 | Moose (c) (with Alisha Edwards and JDC) defeated Ace Austin by pinfall | Singles match for the TNA X Division Championship | 14:45 |
| 4 | Eric Young and Steve Maclin defeated The System (Eddie Edwards and Brian Myers) (with Alisha Edwards) by pinfall | Tag team match | 7:30 |
| 5 | Spitfire (Jody Threat and Dani Luna) (c) defeated Ash by Elegance and Heather by Elegance (with The Personal Concierge) by pinfall | Tag team match for the TNA Knockouts World Tag Team Championship | 9:35 |
| 6 | Tessa Blanchard defeated Jordynne Grace by pinfall | Singles match | 20:15 |
| 7 | Mike Santana defeated Josh Alexander | "I Quit" match The Northern Armory (Judas Icarus and Travis Williams) was banned from ringside. | 23:15 |
| 8 | The Hardys (Jeff Hardy and Matt Hardy) (c) defeated The Rascalz (Trey Miguel and Zachary Wentz) by pinfall | Tag team match for the TNA World Tag Team Championship | 14:00 |
| 9 | Masha Slamovich (c) defeated Rosemary by pinfall | Clockwork Orange House of Fun match for the TNA Knockouts World Championship | 14:05 |
| 10 | Joe Hendry defeated Nic Nemeth (c) by pinfall | Singles match for the TNA World Championship; Ryan Nemeth was banned from ringside. | 19:10 |
(c) / – the champion(s) heading into the match; P / – the match was broadcast on the pre-show
