= Dana Brooke =

American professional wrestler (born 1988)

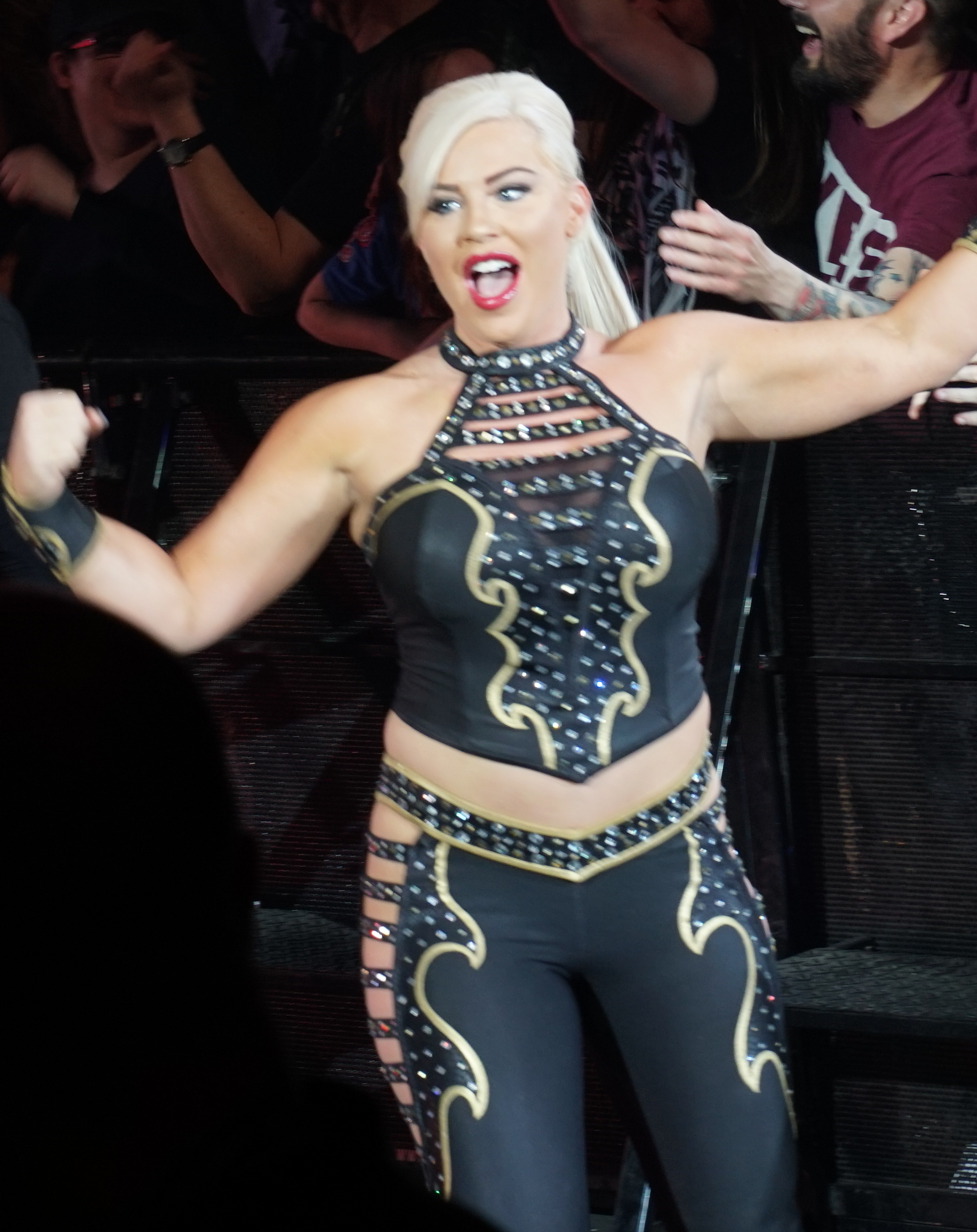
- Ash in 2017

Personal information
- Born: Ashley Mae Sebera; November 29, 1988 (age 37) Seven Hills, Ohio, U.S.
- Education: Kent State University
- Spouse: Ulysses Diaz (m. 2024)

Professional wrestling career
- Ring name(s): Dana Brooke; Ash by Elegance
- Billed height: 5 ft 3 in (160 cm)
- Billed weight: 125 lb (57 kg)
- Billed from: Cleveland, Ohio
- Trained by: Norman Smiley; WWE Performance Center
- Debut: September 18, 2014

Ashley Mae Sebera (born November 29, 1988) is an American professional wrestler and former bodybuilder who is signed to Total Nonstop Action Wrestling (TNA), where she performs under the ring name Ash by Elegance. She is best known for her tenure in WWE from 2013 to 2023, where she performed under the name Dana Brooke.

In July 2013, Sebera signed a contract with WWE and was assigned to the WWE Performance Center and the developmental brand NXT in Orlando, Florida. She allied herself with Emma before being promoted to the main roster on Raw in 2016, where she began allying herself with Charlotte Flair and then with Titus Worldwide alongside Apollo Crews and Titus O'Neil. She began appearing more frequently following her move to SmackDown in 2019, where she was placed in a program alongside Lacey Evans, feuding with Bayley and Sasha Banks. That same year, she re-signed with WWE for an additional five years.

In 2020, she returned to the Raw brand and formed a tag team with Mandy Rose until Rose was sent back to NXT. She then went onto win the 24/7 Champion fifteen times before the belt was retired. In June 2023, she began appearing in NXT again until she was released from her WWE contract in September. In January 2024, she signed with TNA and wrestled as a heel character often accompanied by a manager, George Iceman. She later formed The Elegance Brand with Heather and M by Elegance and went onto win the TNA Knockouts World Tag Team Championship and later won the TNA Knockouts World Championship. She vacated the title due to an undisclosed reason and retired from professional wrestling in October 2025. She returned to in-ring competition in January 2026.

== Early life ==
Ashley Mae Sebera was born on November 29, 1988, in the Cleveland suburb of Seven Hills, Ohio.

Sebera started working as a diver and gymnast for 18 years until she discontinued after severely injuring both her ankles. She then transitioned into bodybuilding and fitness competition In early 2011, Sebera graduated from Kent State University (KSU), earning a major degree of fashion, merchandising and design, and a minor degree of business administration. She used her fashion qualification to open her own boutique.

== Bodybuilding and fitness career ==
After she held several championships in the National Physique Committee (NPC), and earned a pro card at the International Federation of BodyBuilding & Fitness (IFBB) between 2011 and 2012, Sebera competed at the Arnold Classic, including finishing twelfth in 2013, finishing thirteenth in 2015, and finishing fourteenth in 2016.

== Professional wrestling career ==
=== WWE (2013–2025) ===
==== NXT and alliance with Emma (2013–2016) ====
Sebera signed a contract with WWE and was assigned to WWE Performance Center and developmental brand NXT in Orlando, Florida, where she adopted her ring name Dana Brooke, in July 2013. At NXT TakeOver: Fatal 4-Way, Brooke made her first appearance for the brand in a backstage segment with Tyler Breeze. A week later, Brooke made her professional wrestling in–ring debut, where she was teaming with Sasha Banks in a losing effort against Alexa Bliss and Bayley in a tag-team match at an NXT live event.

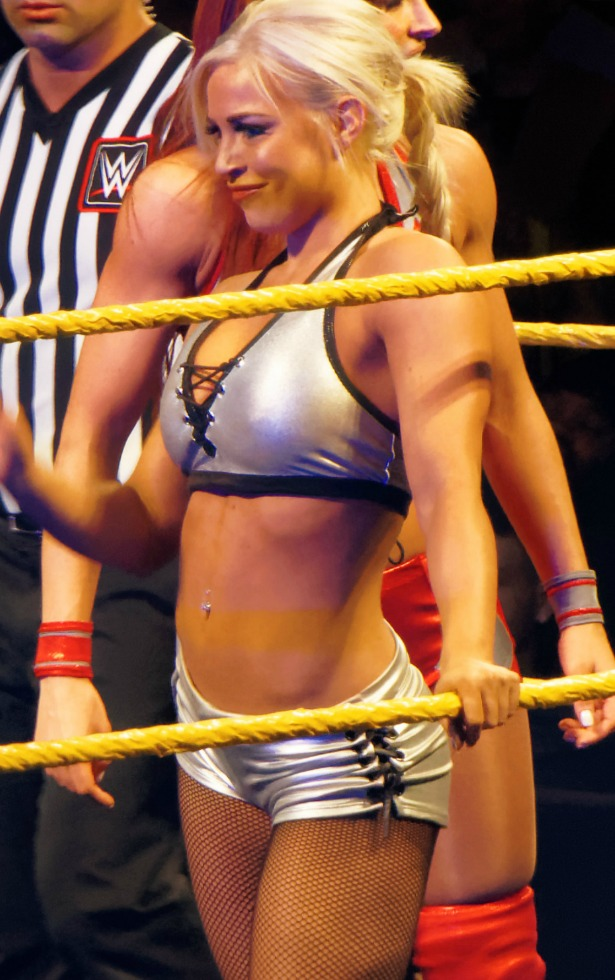
Brooke performing at NXT's live event in 2015.

Brooke made her first televised in-ring debut and defeated Blue Pants on the April 15, 2015 episode of NXT. Brooke was given the entrance theme music titled "Respectful" by CFO$. In the midst of this ongoing feud between Bayley and Emma, Brooke defeated Bayley with a help from Emma on the April 29 episode of NXT, prompting Brooke to form an alliance with Emma. At NXT TakeOver: Unstoppable, Brooke and Emma lost to Bayley and Charlotte after Charlotte pinned Emma. Brooke competed in a fatal–four way match on the August 22 taping of NXT TakeOver: Brooklyn (aired on the August 26 episode of NXT), where Brooke lost after Emma picked up the victory by pinning Becky Lynch.

Since September 23 episode of NXT, Brooke, alongside Emma, had been feuding with Asuka with Brooke losing to Asuka in Asuka's first singles match for the brand at NXT TakeOver: Respect, and Emma losing to Asuka at NXT TakeOver: London.

On the March 23, 2016 episode of NXT, Brooke was in the corner for Emma, while Emma faced Asuka in their NXT TakeOver: London rematch and lost, and this would be Brooke's final appearance for the brand until June 2023.

==== Main roster beginnings and various alliances (2016–2019) ====
Brooke made her main roster debut on the May 9, 2016 episode of Raw, where she assisted Emma to attack Becky Lynch backstage and then three days later, on SmackDown, Brooke defeated Lynch with a help from Emma in Brooke's first singles match on the main roster. Just a few days later, Brooke's association with Emma ended abruptly after Emma suffered a legit back injury at the WWE's live event. At Extreme Rules on May 22, Brooke interfered in the Women's Championship match between Charlotte and Natalya, costing Natalya's chance to regain the title. The next night on Raw, Brooke aligned herself with Charlotte, whom on this night has turned on her father Ric Flair.

Brooke and Charlotte began feuding with Banks. As part of the WWE draft on July 19, 2016, Brooke was drafted to Raw. The next night on Raw after SummerSlam, Brooke and Charlotte began feuding with Bayley, but continued feuding with Banks. In October 2016, Brooke started her own feud with Bayley after the two had a backstage confrontation, whom she defeated by using the ropes for leverage on the October 17 episode of Raw, until the rematch between the two features Brooke losing to Bayley at Hell in a Cell on October 30.

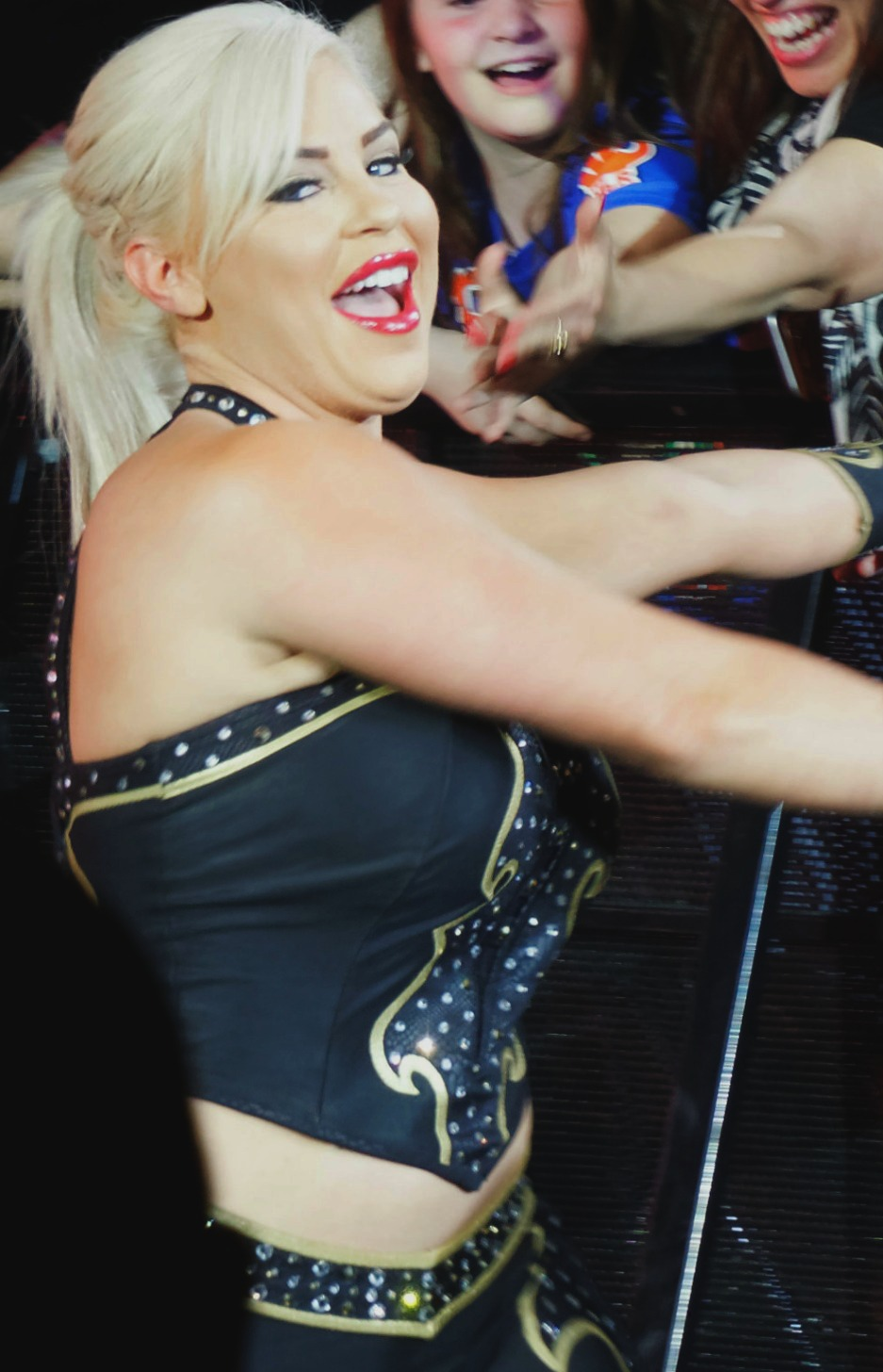
Brooke at the live event show in May 2017.

On the March 13, 2017 episode of Raw, Brooke lost to Banks and then was being berated by multiple insults by Charlotte, Brooke turned face for the first time in her career, when she attacked Charlotte and ended her association with Charlotte. However, a week later, Brooke lost to Charlotte. Brooke's feud with Charlotte ended after Charlotte was drafted to SmackDown during the 2017's Superstar Shake-up.

Towards the end of 2017, Brooke aligned herself with the faction, called "Titus Worldwide" alongside Apollo Crews and Titus O'Neil. At 2018's Royal Rumble pay-per view, Brooke competed in the first ever 30–women Royal Rumble match, entering at number 8 and eliminating NXT's Kairi Sane, only to be eliminated by Torrie Wilson, lasting over 2:59. At WrestleMania 34's kickoff show, Brooke made her WrestleMania debut, competing in the inaugural WrestleMania Women's Battle Royal, where she was eliminated by Mandy Rose. On the September 3 episode of Raw, Brooke was teaming with Ember Moon to take on against Banks and Bayley in a tag-team match, and she and her partner lost when a distraction from Crews and O'Neil causes Brooke to get pinned by Banks, in which led to Brooke ending her association with Crews and O'Neil.

After disbanding with the group by the early September 2018, Brooke took part at the first-ever all women's pay–per–view, called Evolution, competing in the battle royal for a future women's championship match, where she lost after being eliminated by Moon. At 2019's Royal Rumble pay-per view, Brooke competed in the second women's Royal Rumble match, where she entered at number 22 and lasted 7:17, but was eliminated by NXT UK's Rhea Ripley. On the March 11 episode of Raw, Brooke confronted the-then Raw Women's Champion Ronda Rousey for disrespecting wrestling and challenging her to a title match until Rousey accepts by attacking Brooke. The following week on Raw, Brooke lost to Rousey in over a few seconds, who the latter successfully retained her Raw Women's title. Brooke talked about that the promo with Rousey was a Paul Heyman-inspired shoot promo that enabled her to express her actual frustrations and her true feelings.

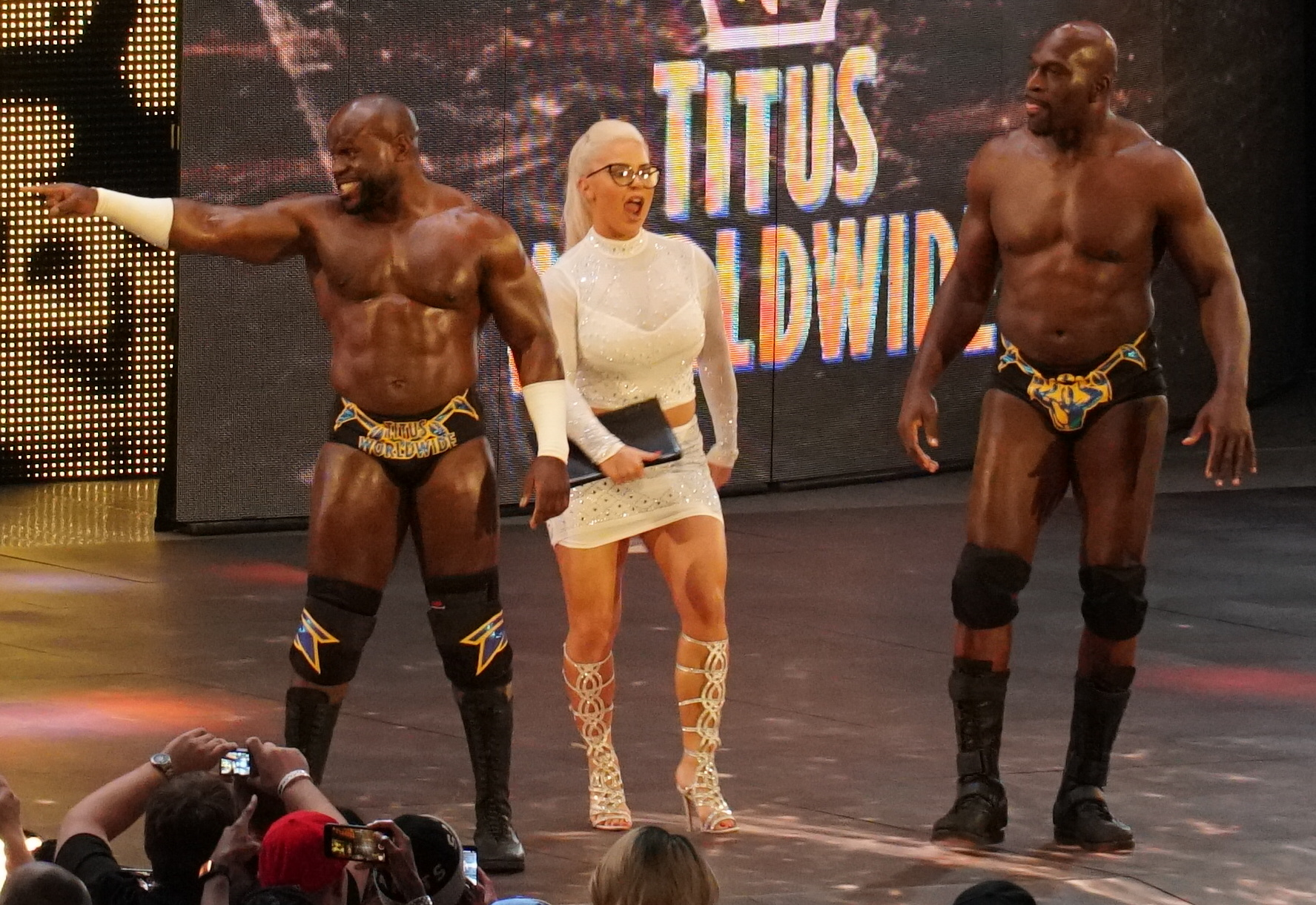
Brooke, alongside Apollo Crews (left) and Titus O'Neil (right), formed the group Titus Worldwide.

At WrestleMania 35's kickoff show, Brooke competed the second WrestleMania Women's Battle Royal, where despite scoring two eliminations, Brooke was being eliminated by Sonya Deville. After defeating Tamina and Ruby Riott on Main Event in mid-April, during "A Moment of Bliss" on the April 29 episode of Raw, Bliss announced Brooke as one of the participants for the women's Money in the Bank ladder match but at 2019's Money in the Bank pay-per view, she was unsuccessful at winning the women's MITB ladder match.

Brooke began feuding with Sarah Logan on Main Event, where the two traded wins with one another. Their feud involved an incident where Brooke was injured via cut on her head in their match on June 18, 2019.

==== Brand switches, 24/7 Champion (2019–2023) ====
On October 16, Brooke was drafted to SmackDown as part of the 2019's WWE draft. In line with Brooke's move to the brand, she began receiving more television time and showcased her improved skill and move-sets. On the November 8 episode of SmackDown, Brooke and Carmella defeated Rose and Deville to qualify as part of Team SmackDown at Survivor Series. At 2019's Survivor Series pay-per view, Team SmackDown lost to Team NXT. In December, Brooke revealed that she had signed a five-year multi-deal to remain with WWE.

Brooke was an entrant in the third women's Royal Rumble match at the 2020 pay-per-view. Brooke was scheduled to take part in the SmackDown Women's Championship match at WrestleMania 36. However, the match had to be changed with her being taken out of that match due to Brooke being quarantining as a precautionary measures during the COVID-19 pandemic in the United States. On the April 17 episode of SmackDown, Brooke defeated Naomi to qualify for the women's Money in the Bank ladder match at the 2020 pay-per-view. Brooke took part in the women's Money in the Bank ladder match. Brooke did not win. Brooke was traded back to Raw on September 28, 2020, but suffered a legitimate injury on November, which resulted in Brooke being pulled from their upcoming involvement during the 2020 Survivor Series pay-per-view event. To remove Brooke from the event, writers worked an angle in which Brooke was attacked by Reckoning, leaving her unable to compete. On November 30, Brooke defeated Reckoning in singles competition.

Brooke and Rose participated in the "Tag Team Turmoil" at WrestleMania 37. On May 3, Charlotte defeated Brooke via submission. On May 10, Brooke, Rose and Asuka defeated Baszler, Jax and Charlotte in a tag team match. A feud with Tamina and Natalya resulted in Rose being defeated by the latter at Hell in a Cell. On the June 28 edition of Raw, Brooke and Rose teamed with Rhea Ripley but were defeated by Charlotte, Tamina and Natalya. Between 2022 and 2023, Brooke won the 24/7 Championship, her first title win in WWE. She was involved in several storylines around the title, which she won 15 times. WWE continued to feature Brooke in comedic backstage vignettes including Reggie, Tamina and Tozawa. On March 29, 2022, that storyline progressed with Brooke's getting engaged to Reggie. As part of the storyline, Brooke requested a divorce from Reggie, after he attempted to pin her. On May 31, Brooke lost the championship after she was pinned by Tamina. On the June 6, 2023 episode of NXT, Brooke made a surprise return to NXT after seven years and participated in a number one contender battle royal for the NXT Women's Championship, where she was in the final three, but was eliminated by Thea Hail. Afterwards, Brooke began serving as a mentor for Kelani Jordan, but in August 2023, Brooke began turning heel and displayed a villainous persona in matches. On September 21, 2023, Brooke was released from her WWE contract, along with several other talents, ending her decade-long tenure with the company.

==== Sporadic appearances (2024–2025) ====
As part of the partnership between TNA and WWE, she returned to NXT in 2024 with the Ash by Elegance ring name. At Heatwave, she won the TNA Knockouts Championship.

=== Total Nonstop Action Wrestling (2024–present) ===
After her WWE release, Sebera signed with Total Nonstop Action Wrestling (TNA), making her debut at Hard To Kill, under the name of Ash by Elegance. On the February 22, 2024 episode of TNA Impact!, Ash made her official TNA in-ring debut as a heel by defeating Savannah Thorne.

In the following months, Ash began a winning streak, where she won against the likes of Xia Brookside, Havok, and Heather Reckless. She unsuccessfully challenged Jordynne Grace for the TNA Knockouts World Championship at Slammiversary and the August 29, 2024 edition of Impact. At Emergence, Ash teamed up with The Malisha against Jordynne Grace, Dani Luna, and Jody Threat in a losing effort, which ended Grace and Ash's feud.

Ash began a partnership with Heather Reckless, after both wrestlers had helped win each other's matches. Ash gave Reckless a makeover and renamed her Heather by Elegance and she started dressing like Ash. At Bound for Glory, Ash and Heather defeated Xia Brookside and Brinley Reece in their tag team debut. They faced Dani Luna and Jody Threat at Genesis for the TNA Knockouts World Tag Team Championship in a losing effort, but they won the titles at Sacrifice. That year, Maggie Lee joined The Elegance Brand as M by Elegance. Ash and Heather successfully defended the TNA Knockouts World Tag Team Championship against The IInspiration at the 2025 Slammiversary event. On August 24, 2025, Ash won the TNA Knockouts World Championship during a triple threat match with Masha Slamovich and Jacy Jayne at NXT Heatwave. On September 27 at Victory Road, Ash announced that she would be vacating the title due to an undisclosed reason, ending her reign at 34 days. On October 10, Ash announced that would be retiring from professional wrestling during a virtual signing, but kept working with TNA as producer, and the Elegance Brand's Manager.

On the January 22, 2026 episode of Impact!, Ash announced that she was medically cleared and would be returning to in-ring competition. On the October 22, 2026 episode of Impact, M by Elegance announced that she would take over the leadership of The Elegance Brand, thus becoming the de facto leader with Ash inactive due to ongoing health concerns.

== Other media ==
Two action figures of Brooke have been produced over the years. She has appeared in the 68th and 81st series of Mattel wrestling action figures. She has also been featured on numerous Topps branded collectible trading cards.

=== Video games ===
Video game appearances
Year	Title	Notes	Ref.
2016	WWE 2K17	Video game debut	
2017	WWE 2K18		
2018	WWE 2K19		
2019	WWE 2K20		
2020	WWE 2K Battlegrounds	Downloadable content	
2022	WWE 2K22		
2023	WWE 2K23		

== Personal life ==
Sebera was in a relationship with fellow American bodybuilder Dallas McCarver until his death on August 22, 2017. From 2018 to 2019, she dated NBA professional basketball player Enes Kanter Freedom. In July 2021, Sebera and Cuban boxer Ulysses Diaz got engaged, and they were married on December 7, 2024. In June 2022, Sebera was involved in a non-fatal car crash. The accident forced her to miss her wrestling commitments with WWE. She later revealed that the car accident was "bad" but she would recover quickly. On November 18, 2026, Sebera announced that she is expecting their rainbow baby boy after suffering a miscarriage in the past.

== Championships and accomplishments ==
=== Bodybuilding ===
- National Physique Committee
  - World Amateur Bodybuilding Championship (1 silver)
- Mr. Olympia
  - Female Image Award (2017)
  - Best Female of the Year (2017)

=== Professional wrestling ===
- Boca Raton Championship Wrestling
  - BRCW Women’s Championship (1 time)
- Pro Wrestling Illustrated
  - Ranked No. 26 of the top 50 female wrestlers in the PWI Female 50 in 2016
- Total Nonstop Action Wrestling
  - TNA Knockouts World Championship (1 time)
  - TNA Knockouts World Tag Team Championship (1 time) – with Heather by Elegance and M by Elegance
  - TNA Year End Awards (2 times)
    - Knockout Of The Year (2025)
    - Knockout Tag Team Of The Year (2025) – with Heather by Elegance, M by Elegance and The Personal Concierge
- World Series Wrestling
  - WSW Women's Championship (3 times)
- WWE
  - WWE 24/7 Championship (15 times)
