= Brinley Reece =

American professional wrestler (born 2000)

Personal information
- Born: Breanna Ruggiero; September 5, 2000 (age 26) Roseville, California, U.S.
- Spouse: Marcus Aponte (m. 2026)

Professional wrestling career
- Ring name: Brinley Reece
- Billed height: 5 ft 8 in (173 cm)
- Billed from: Roseville, California
- Trained by: WWE Performance Center
- Debut: October 17, 2023

Breanna Aponte (née Ruggiero (born September 5, 2000) is an American professional wrestler. She is best known for her time in WWE, where she performed on the Evolve brand under the ring name Brinley Reece.

== Early life ==
Ruggiero was born in Roseville, California on September 5, 2000. She attended Woodcreek High School and Sacramento State. Prior to signing with WWE, she was a tumbler and an acrobat.

== Professional wrestling career ==
=== WWE (2022-2026) ===
==== NXT and Evolve (2022–2026) ====
On July 29, 2022, Ruggiero was one of fourteen people to have attended a tryout in Nashville, Tennessee, during SummerSlam weekend, where she and eight other women, were handed contracts by Paul "Triple H" Levesque. In November 2022, it was confirmed that she had joined the Fall 2022 Rookie Class and reported to the WWE Performance Center.

On October 17, 2023, Ruggiero appeared in her first televised match on NXT under her ring name Brinley Reece as a replacement for Jakara Jackson in the first round of the Women's NXT Breakout Tournament after Jackson was ruled unable to compete medically. Reece competed in a losing effort against Arianna Grace, who defeated her by raking her in the eyes and hitting her with a twisting slam. On the January 16, 2024, edition of NXT, Reece competed in a 20-woman battle royal for the chance to earn a number one contender's match against Lyra Valkyria for the NXT Women's Championship at NXT Vengeance Day, but was unsuccessful in her efforts, as it was won by Roxanne Perez. On the August 20 edition of NXT, Reece took part in a six-woman gauntlet match to determine the number one contender for Perez's NXT Women's Championship at NXT No Mercy, replacing Karmen Petrovic who had been ambushed in the parking lot by Izzi Dame. She would be eliminated from the match by Kendal Grey. Around October, Reece and Dion Lennox was involved in a love triangle storyline between Ashante "Thee" Adonis, Karmen Petrovic and Nikkita Lyons, where Adonis and Petrovic defeated Lennox and Reece in a mixed tag team match on the November 19 episode of NXT.

On the March 19, 2025 episode of Evolve, Reece defeated Masyn Holiday in her Evolve debut appearance. In May 2025, Reece suffered a shoulder injury. On January 4, 2026, Ruggiero announced her departure from WWE.

== Personal life ==
On August 6, 2025 Ruggiero announced her engagement to boyfriend Marcus Aponte. They were married on October 3, 2026.
