= Bound for Glory (2024) =

2024 TNA Wrestling pay-per-view event

- Promotion: Total Nonstop Action Wrestling
- Date: October 26, 2024
- City: Detroit, Michigan
- Venue: Wayne State Fieldhouse
- Attendance: 3,000

Pay-per-view chronology
← Previous; Slammiversary	Next → Genesis

Bound for Glory chronology
← Previous; 2023	Next → 2025

The 2024 Bound for Glory was a professional wrestling pay-per-view (PPV) event produced by Total Nonstop Action Wrestling (TNA). It took place on October 26, 2024, at Wayne State Fieldhouse in Detroit, Michigan. It was the 20th event under the Bound for Glory chronology. Wrestlers from WWE's NXT brand and Mexico's Lucha Libre AAA Worldwide (AAA) promotion appeared on the show due to TNA having partnerships with the respective entities.

Ten matches were contested at the event, including two on the pre-show. In the main event, The Hardys (Matt Hardy and Jeff Hardy) defeated previous champion The System (Brian Myers and Eddie Edwards) and ABC (Ace Austin and Chris Bey) in a three-way Full Metal Mayhem match to win the TNA World Tag Team Championship. In other prominent matches, Nic Nemeth defeated Joe Hendry to retain the TNA World Championship and Masha Slamovich defeated Jordynne Grace to win the TNA Knockouts World Championship.

== Production ==
=== Background ===
Bound for Glory is a professional wrestling pay-per-view (PPV) event produced by Total Nonstop Action Wrestling. The event was created in 2005 to serve as the company's flagship PPV event, similar to WWE's WrestleMania, in which wrestlers competed in various professional wrestling match types in what was the culmination of many feuds and storylines that occurred during the calendar year. On the August 8, 2024 episode of TNA Impact!, it was announced that TNA would hold their 2024 Bound for Glory pay-per-view event at Wayne State Fieldhouse on October 26, 2024, in Detroit, Michigan.

=== Storylines ===
Other on-screen personnel
Role:	Name:
Commentators	Tom Hannifan
Commentators	Matthew Rehwoldt
Ring announcer	Jennifer Chung
Referees	Daniel Spencer
Referees	Paige Prinzivalli
Referees	Frank Gastineau
Referees	Frankie Kazarian (TNA World Title match)
Interviewer	Gia Miller

The event featured several professional wrestling matches, which involve different wrestlers from pre-existing scripted feuds, plots, and storylines. Wrestlers portrayed heroes, villains, or less distinguishable characters in scripted events that build tension and culminate in a wrestling match or series of matches. Storylines were produced on the company's weekly programs, Impact! and Xplosion.

On the September 19 episode of Impact!, Joe Hendry declared his intention to challenge for the TNA World Championship after defeating Josh Alexander by submission at Victory Road. Frankie Kazarian interrupted him and denounced his victory by accusing him of using a protective cup to avoid loss. Kazarian then demanded a title shot against TNA World Champion Nic Nemeth until the Director of Authority Santino Marella announced that Hendry and Kazarian would compete in a match on the following week's Impact! and the winner would become the #1 contender for the title against Nemeth at Bound for Glory. The following week, Hendry defeated Kazarian after the match was restarted to become the #1 contender for the TNA World Championship, confirming his title match against Nemeth at Bound for Glory. However, on the October 18 episode, Kazarian confronted Nemeth and Hendry, announcing that he will be the special guest referee for their match at the event.

On the August 1 episode of Impact!, Matt Cardona made his return to TNA, crashing the wedding ceremony between PCO and Steph De Lander by attacking PCO with a cinderblock. Since then, Cardona has repeatedly targeted PCO to take back De Lander, whom he deemed his "property." At the same time, Cardona had been avoiding the idea of a match against PCO, claiming he was medically unable to compete. On the September 5 Impact!, De Lander finally confronted Cardona about his actions against PCO and herself, to which Cardona revealed a contract De Lander had signed when the two began their partnership on the independent circuit two years ago. In it, the contract effectively made De Lander subservient to Cardona, thereby making her his to use in Cardona's mind. At Victory Road, it seemed as though PCO and Cardona would have some sort of match together, with PCO and Rhino facing Cardona and De Lander in a tag team match. However, before the match started, De Lander revealed that she would be stepping away due to neck surgery. She and PCO would leave the arena together, only for Cardona to jump Rhino right after. Two weeks later on Impact!, Santino Marella, having had enough of Cardona dodging a match with PCO, declared to Cardona that he would not only face PCO for his TNA Digital Media Championship and International Heavyweight Wrestling Championship at Bound for Glory, but that it will be contested in a Monster's Ball match.

Since returning to TNA at Rebellion, Mike Santana aimed to win the TNA World Championship, held at the time by Moose of The System. As such, Moose and The System (Brian Myers, Eddie Edwards, JDC, and Alisha Edwards) did what they could ensure Santana would not have a world title opportunity, costing him his "Road to Slammiversary" qualifying match on the July 4 episode of Impact! by having JDC attack him and lose by count out. After Slammiversary, Santana would be involved with numerous matches and altercations with The System, Moose in particular. On the August 15 Impact!, The System attacked Santana backstage before his match with Moose, and despite Santana's resilience and insistence to have the match, he still lost. Over a month later, Santana gained retribution on JDC by defeating him in a Texas Deathmatch, only to again be attacked by Moose. Santana would invade The System's locker room the following week and attack them with a chain. On the October 10 Impact!, Santana called Moose out, declaring that he was never going to be safe as long as he was around. Moose would come out while flanked by personal security; Santana claimed that he and Moose were similar in that they both had hard upbringings but stated that Moose forgot where he came from. The System then ambushed Santana before he was saved by The Hardys (Matt Hardy and Jeff Hardy) and ABC (Ace Austin and Chris Bey), to which Santino Marella officially announced that Moose and Santana would have a proper match at Bound for Glory.

On the September 12 episode of Impact!, The Hardys defeated Brian Myers and Eddie Edwards of The System in a tag team match. However, the following night at Victory Road, The System regained the TNA World Tag Team Championship from ABC. In the following month, while The System dealt with Mike Santana, ABC and The Hardys debated over who would get the next opportunity at the tag team titles, as ABC was owed a rematch but The Hardys did beat Myers and Edwards prior. On the October 10 Impact!, a match between the two teams was interrupted by The System. An exhausted Santino Marella would come out again and declare that not only would The System defend the titles against both The Hardys and ABC, but had also made it a Full Metal Mayhem match.

At Bound for Glory two years ago, Jordynne Grace retained the TNA Knockouts World Championship against Masha Slamovich, breaking the latter's then-undefeated streak. Two years later, on the October 10 Impact!, Slamovich, now a babyface after breaking her alliance with The System after attacking Alisha Edwards at Victory Road, teamed with Grace and NXT wrestler Sol Ruca to defeat Rosemary, Tasha Steelz, and NXT's Wendy Choo, although there were signs of tension between Grace and Slamovich. Later in the show, Grace searched for Slamovich backstage, finding a mural of "death warrants" (pictures of TNA Knockouts crossed out in blood, save for Grace's) in Slamovich's locker room. Grace then called out Slamovich in the ring, challenging her to a Knockouts World Championship match at Bound for Glory. Slamovich, believing Grace was keeping her close after defeating her two years ago, accepted before handing Grace a death warrant. TNA would later make the match official.

On October 15, TNA announced on their website that Lucha Libre AAA Worldwide (AAA) wrestler El Hijo del Vikingo would make his return to the company at Bound for Glory. His match would be announced three days later on Impact!, where a video package revealed he would challenge Mike Bailey for the TNA X Division Championship at the event.

After losing to Joe Hendry at Victory Road, Josh Alexander returned to TNA on the September 26 Impact!, addressing Eric Young who had tried to steer him on a more righteous path. He initially seemed to heed Young's advice and offered to walk to the back with him, only to then attack him and proclaim the person he is now is the one he needed to be. Steve Maclin, who promised to stand by Young after the two faced off at Emergence, tried to intervene, only to be stopped by the tag team Sinner and Saint (Judas Icarus and Travis Williams), who aligned with Alexander. The trio would later unite as The Northern Armory. On the October 10 episode, Alexander defeated Young thanks to interference from The Northern Armory, before leading an assault that ended with Alexander hitting Young's knee with a steel chair. It was also revealed that The Northern Armory attacked Maclin backstage to prevent his involvement. The following week, Maclin called out The Northern Armory and got into a heated exchange with Alexander before the trio executed an attack on Maclin, tying his hands behind him with zip ties. TNA would later announce a match between Maclin and Alexander would be made official for Bound for Glory.

As is tradition, the Call Your Shot Gauntlet – a 20 wrestler gauntlet style battle royal (open to both men and women) for a championship opportunity at the time and place of the winner's choosing – will take place at Bound for Glory, with the 2024 edition occurring during the Countdown to Bound for Glory pre-show. On the October 24 Impact!, A. J. Francis won a six-way match also involving Frankie Kazarian, Sami Callihan, Laredo Kid, Jake Something, and Jason Hotch, claiming the twentieth and final spot in the match; by being pinned, Kazarian would be forced to enter the match first.

== Hall of Fame inductions ==
As has become tradition in recent years, TNA held new inductions into its Hall of Fame during the Countdown to Bound for Glory preshow. 2024 inductees included Detroit native Rhino, who has wrestled for TNA (on and off) since 2005, is a former NWA Worlds Heavyweight Champion (when TNA used it as its primary title), a two-time TNA World Tag Team Champion, and main evented the inaugural Bound for Glory in 2005, where he defeated Jeff Jarrett to win the NWA World Title. Bob Ryder, a former online wrestling journalist who was a co-founder of TNA in 2002 with Jerry and Jeff Jarrett and worked as an executive in the company until his death in 2020, was posthumously inducted.

== Results ==
No.	Results	Stipulations	Times
1^{P}	Ash and Heather by Elegance (with The Personal Concierge) defeated Xia Brookside and Brinley Reece by pinfall	Tag team match	8:42
2^{P}	Frankie Kazarian won by last eliminating Rhino	20-person Intergender Call Your Shot Gauntlet; The winner receives a trophy and a contract they can invoke anytime within one year for a championship match of their choosing.	26:37
3	Mike Bailey (c) defeated El Hijo del Vikingo by pinfall	Singles match for the TNA X Division Championship	14:55
4	Spitfire (Jody Threat and Dani Luna) (c) defeated Rosemary and Wendy Choo by pinfall	Tag team match for the TNA Knockouts World Tag Team Championship	10:32
5	Josh Alexander defeated Steve Maclin by technical submission	Singles match	14:32
6	PCO (c) defeated Matt Cardona by pinfall	Monster's Ball match for the TNA Digital Media Championship and International Heavyweight Wrestling Championship	13:16
7	Mike Santana defeated Moose by pinfall	Singles match	13:49
8	Masha Slamovich defeated Jordynne Grace (c) by pinfall	Singles match for the TNA Knockouts World Championship	12:42
9	Nic Nemeth (c) defeated Joe Hendry by pinfall	Singles match for the TNA World Championship; Frankie Kazarian was the special guest referee.	15:13
10	The Hardys (Matt Hardy and Jeff Hardy) defeated The System (Brian Myers and Eddie Edwards) (c) (with Alisha Edwards) and ABC (Ace Austin and Chris Bey) by retrieving the titles	Three-way Full Metal Mayhem match for the TNA World Tag Team Championship	27:25
(c) / – the champion(s) heading into the match; P / – the match was broadcast on the pre-show

=== Call Your Shot Gauntlet entrances and eliminations ===
Draw	Entrant	Eliminated by	Order	Elimination(s)
1	Frankie Kazarian	Winner	–	2
2	Zachary Wentz	A. J. Francis and Jake Something	16	3
3	Jake Something	Zachary Wentz	15	2
4	Trey Miguel	Hammerstone	2	0
5	Hammerstone	Zachary Wentz	3	2
6	Rohit Raju	Rhino	4	0
7	Laredo Kid	Hammerstone	1	0
8	Sami Callihan	Rhino	7	0
9	John Skyler	Rhino	6	0
10	Bhupinder Gujjar	Rhino	5	0
11	Trent Seven	A. J. Francis	13	0
12	KC Navarro	Zachary Wentz	9	0
13	Rhino	Frankie Kazarian	19	6
14	Tasha Steelz	Léi Ying Lee	8	0
15	Léi Ying Lee	Frankie Kazarian	10	1
16	Jason Hotch	Jake Something	14	0
17	Leon Slater	JDC	11	0
18	Jonathan Gresham	A. J. Francis	12	0
19	JDC	Rhino	17	0
20	A. J. Francis	Rhino	18	3

- Jake Something was already eliminated when he helped eliminate Zachary Wentz.
