= Maggie Lee (wrestler) =

American professional wrestler (born 2002)

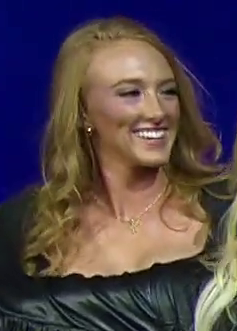
- Lee in 2026

Personal information
- Born: March 25, 2002 (age 24) Cedar Rapids, Iowa, U.S.

Professional wrestling career
- Ring name(s): Maggie Lee; Maggie Minerva; Maggie McKinney; Maggie Moore; M By Elegance
- Billed height: 5 ft 11 in (180 cm)
- Billed from: Cedar Rapids, Iowa
- Trained by: Krotch; Marek Brave; Seth Rollins
- Debut: August 13, 2022

Maggie Peters (born March 25, 2002) is an American professional wrestler. She is signed to Total Nonstop Action Wrestling (TNA), where she performs under the ring name M by Elegance as a member of The Elegance Brand. She was the inaugural TNA Knockouts Television Champion. She also makes appearances on the independent circuit under the ring name Maggie Lee.

== Early life ==
Peters was born in Cedar Rapids, Iowa on March 25, 2002. She attended Jefferson High School, Kirkwood Community College and Mount Mercy University, all of where she played volleyball and earned All Region and All Conference honors in volleyball at Mount Mercy. While at Mount Mercy, she graduated with a degree in exercise science.

== Professional wrestling career ==
=== Early career (2022–2024) ===
Peters made her debut on August 13, 2022 under the name Maggie McKinney. Shortly afterward, she adopted the ring name Maggie Lee and on April 15, 2023, she won her professional wrestling title by winning the HAW Reinas Championship.

=== Total Nonstop Action Wrestling (2024–present) ===
Lee made her Total Nonstop Action Wrestling (TNA) debut on the October 11, 2024 episode of Xplosion under the ring name Maggie Moore. On the March 21, 2025 episode of Xplosion, she scored her first pinfall in the promotion. Six days later, TNA announced that they had signed Lee.

On the May 8 episode of TNA Impact!, Lee began associating herself with Ash by Elegance and Heather by Elegance of The Elegance Brand. On the May 29, 2025, episode of Impact!, The Personal Concierge announced Lee as M by Elegance, the new product of The Elegance Brand, becoming a co-holder of the TNA Knockouts World Tag Team Championship. Heather and M by Elegance lost the tag team titles to The IInspiration (Jessie McKay and Cassie Lee) on the October 2 episode of Impact!, but regained the titles after defeating The IInspiration on Thursday Night Impact!'s AMC debut on January 15, 2026. On June 28 at Slammiversary, Heather and M once again lost the TNA Knockouts World Tag Team Championship, this time to DemonXBunny (Rosemary and Allie). On June 30, TNA released the bracket for the inaugural tournament for the TNA Knockouts Television Championship, which included fellow stablemate M by Elegance. She defeated Rosemary in the first round, received a bye in the quarterfinals, and defeated Indi Hartwell in the semifinals. She defeated Jada Stone in the final to become the inaugural champion on August 27. On the October 22, 2026 episode of Impact, M announced that she would take over the leadership of The Elegance Brand, thus becoming the de facto leader with Ash inactive due to health concerns.

=== WWE (2025-2026) ===
Maggie made her WWE debut as a TNA contracted wrestler in 2025. On the 6 October 2026 episode of NXT, she appeared as a surprise entrant in the 20-woman Battle Royale to determine the number 1 contender for the NXT Women's Championship at Halloween Havoc.

== Championships and accomplishments ==
- 3XWrestling
  - 3XW Pure Wrestling Championship (1 time)
- AAW: Professional Wrestling Redefined
  - AAW Women's Championship (2 times, current)
- Dreamwave Wrestling
  - Dreamwave Women's Championship (1 time)
- Glory Pro Wrestling
  - Glory Pro Women's World Crown Championship (2 times, current)
- Honor Among Wrestling
  - HAW Reinas Championship (1 time)
- Hooligan Championship Wrestling
  - HCW Women's World Championship (1 time)
- Midwest All-Star Wrestling
  - MAW Women's Championship (1 time)
- Pro Wrestling Epic
  - PWE Women's Championship (1 time)
- Pro Wrestling Illustrated
  - Ranked No. 89 of the top 250 women's wrestlers in the PWI Women's 250 in 2025
- RUGGEDpro Wrestling
  - RUGGEDpro Heritage Championship (1 time)
- Total Nonstop Action Wrestling
  - TNA Knockouts Television Championship (1 time, inaugural)
  - TNA Knockouts World Tag Team Championship (2 times) – with Ash by Elegance and Heather by Elegance (1) and Heather by Elegance (1)
  - TNA Year End Awards (1 time)
    - Tag Team Of The Year (2025) – with Ash by Elegance, Heather by Elegance and The Personal Concierge
