= List of TNA Knockouts World Tag Team Champions =

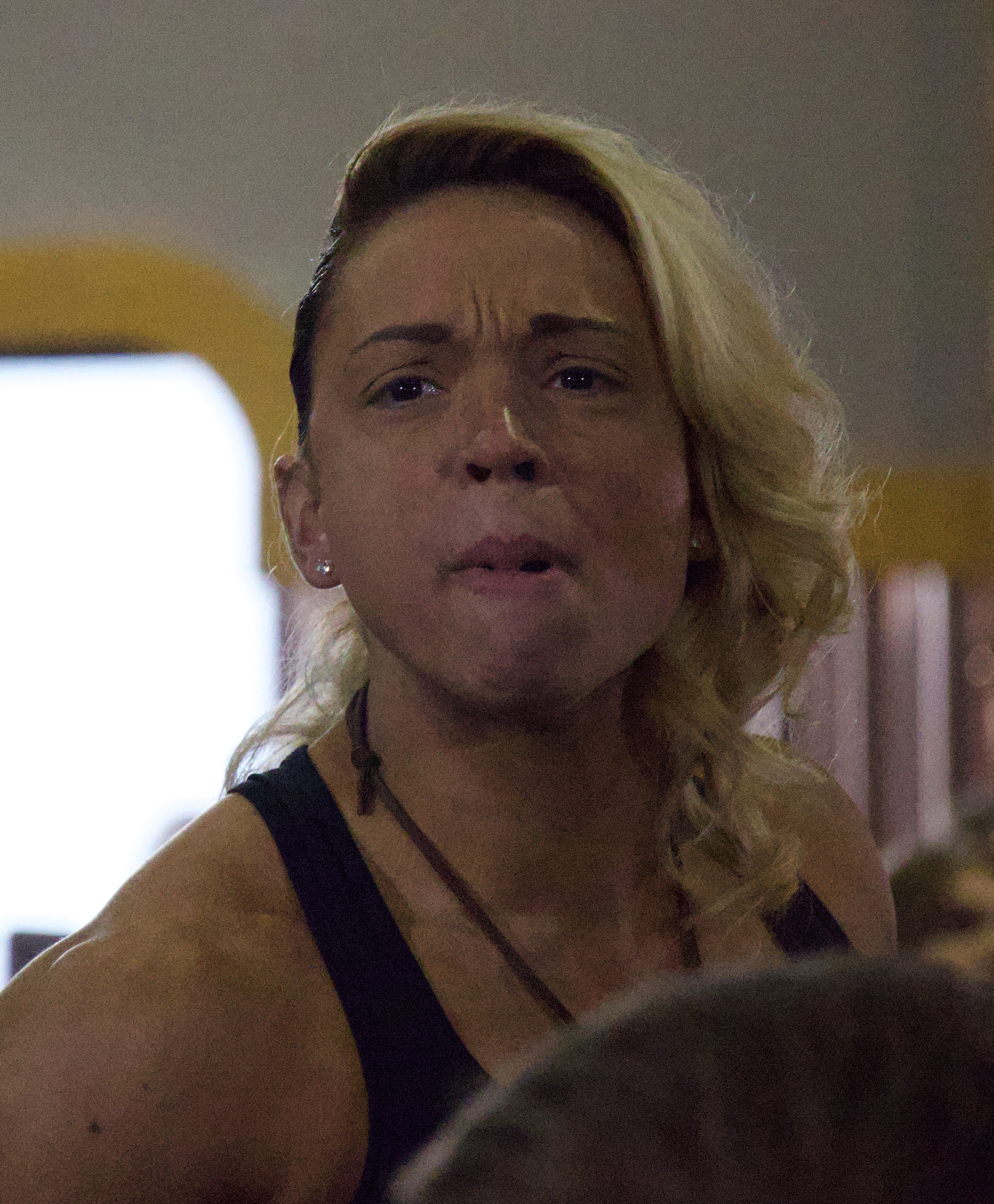
Current champions Apex (Zoey Serrano and Shayna Baszler)

The TNA Knockouts World Tag Team Championship is a professional wrestling world tag team championship contested in Total Nonstop Action Wrestling (TNA).

The championship is generally contested in professional wrestling matches, in which participants execute scripted finishes rather than contend in direct competition. The inaugural championship team was Sarita and Taylor Wilde.

As of November 16, 2026, there have been 30 reigns shared between 23 teams and 39 wrestlers. As a team, Decay (Havok/Jessicka and Rosemary) has the most reigns at three, while individually, Rosemary has the record with four. As a team, Eric Young and ODB have the longest reign at 478 days, while MK Ultra (Masha Slamovich and Killer Kelly)'s second reign is the shortest at 14 days. Apex (Zoey Serrano and Shayna Baszler) are the current champions in their first reign as a team and individually. They won the title by defeating Allie and Kiera Hogan at Bound for Glory on October 11, 2026, in Tampa, Florida.

== Title history ==
=== Names ===
Name	Year
TNA Knockouts Tag Team Championship	August 20, 2009 – June 27, 2013
Impact Knockouts Tag Team Championship	October 24, 2020 – October 23, 2021
Impact Knockouts World Tag Team Championship	October 23, 2021 – January 13, 2024
TNA Knockouts World Tag Team Championship	January 13, 2024–present

=== Reigns ===
Key
No.	Overall reign number
Reign	Reign number for the specific team—reign numbers for the individuals are in parentheses, if different
Days	Number of days held
+	Current reign is changing daily

No.	Champion	Championship change			Reign statistics		Notes	Ref.
No.	Champion	Date	Event	Location	Reign	Days	Notes	Ref.
Total Nonstop Action Wrestling (TNA)
1	Sarita and Taylor Wilde	September 20, 2009	No Surrender	Orlando, FL	1	106	Defeated The Beautiful People (Madison Rayne and Velvet Sky) in a tournament final to become the inaugural champions.	
2	Awesome Kong and Hamada	January 4, 2010	Impact!	Orlando, FL	1	63		
—	Vacated	March 8, 2010	Impact!	Orlando, FL	—	—	The title was vacated after Awesome Kong was released from TNA, with the championship allegedly not being defended for 30 days used as the storyline reason.	
3	The Beautiful People (Lacey Von Erich, Madison Rayne, and Velvet Sky)	March 8, 2010	Impact!	Orlando, FL	1	141	Rayne and Sky defeated Sarita and Taylor Wilde and Angelina Love and Tara in a three-way tag team match to win the vacant title. Von Erich was also recognized as champion, and the trio defended the title under the Freebird Rule.	
4	Hamada and Taylor Wilde	July 27, 2010	Impact!	Orlando, FL	1 (2, 2)	132	Velvet Sky and Lacey Von Erich represented The Beautiful People. Aired on tape delay on August 5.	
—	Vacated	December 6, 2010	Impact!	Orlando, FL	—	—	The title was vacated after Hamada was released from her TNA contract, with the title not being defended for 30 days used as the storyline reason. Aired on tape delay on December 9, 2010.	
5	Angelina Love and Winter	December 9, 2010	Impact!	Orlando, FL	1	94	Defeated Madison Rayne and Tara in a tournament final to win the vacant title. Velvet Sky was Love's original partner in the tournament, but was taken out by a pre-match attack by Sarita, allowing Winter to replace her in the final. Aired on tape delay on December 23.	
6	Mexican America (Rosita and Sarita)	March 13, 2011	Victory Road	Orlando, FL	1 (1, 2)	121	On the May 3 tapings of Impact, TNA announced the rebrand as "Impact Wrestling" (aired on a tape delay on May 12).	
Impact Wrestling
7	TnT (Brooke Tessmacher and Tara)	July 12, 2011	Impact Wrestling	Orlando, FL	1	106	Aired on tape delay on July 21.	
8	Gail Kim and Madison Rayne	October 26, 2011	Impact Wrestling	Macon, GA	1 (1, 2)	125	Aired on tape delay on November 3.	
9	Eric Young and ODB	February 28, 2012	Impact Wrestling	Orlando, FL	1	478	Young became the only male talent to hold the title. Aired on tape delay on March 8.	
—	Vacated	June 20, 2013	Impact Wrestling	Peoria, IL	—	—	The title was vacated by Knockouts Division Executive Brooke Hogan due to Eric Young being a male talent.	
—	Deactivated	June 27, 2013	—	—	—	—	The title was deactivated, and its profile was removed from the promotion's website.	
10	Fire 'N Flava (Kiera Hogan and Tasha Steelz)	January 16, 2021	Hard To Kill	Nashville, TN	1	99	Upon the reactivation of the title, it was renamed the "Impact Knockouts Tag Team Championship". Fire 'N Flava defeated Havok and Nevaeh in a tournament final to win the revived title.	
11	Jordynne Grace and Rachael Ellering	April 25, 2021	Rebellion	Nashville, TN	1	20		
12	Fire 'N Flava (Kiera Hogan and Tasha Steelz)	May 15, 2021	Under Siege	Nashville, TN	2	63		
13	Decay (Havok and Rosemary)	July 17, 2021	Slammiversary; Pre-show	Nashville, TN	1	98		
14	The IInspiration (Jessie McKay and Cassie Lee)	October 23, 2021	Bound for Glory	Sunrise Manor, NV	1	133	Upon their win, the title was renamed the "Impact Knockouts World Tag Team Championship".	
15	The Influence (Madison Rayne and Tenille Dashwood)	March 5, 2022	Sacrifice	Louisville, KY	1 (3, 1)	106		
16	Rosemary and Taya Valkyrie	June 19, 2022	Slammiversary	Nashville, TN	1 (2, 1)	54		
17	VXT (Chelsea Green and Deonna Purrazzo)	August 12, 2022	Emergence; Pre-show	Cicero, IL	1	56		
18	The Death Dollz (Jessicka, Rosemary, and Taya Valkyrie)	October 7, 2022	Bound for Glory	Albany, NY	2 (2, 3, 2)	142	Jessicka was formerly known as Havok. Jessicka and Valkyrie won the title, while Rosemary was recognized as champion via the Freebird Rule.	
19	The Coven (KiLynn King and Taylor Wilde)	February 26, 2023	Impact!	Sunrise Manor, NV	1 (1, 3)	139	Rosemary and Taya Valkyrie represented The Death Dollz. Aired on tape delay on March 16.	
20	MK Ultra (Note: Originally won the titles under the team name of "Masha Slamovich and Killer Kelly".) (Killer Kelly and Masha Slamovich)	July 15, 2023	Slammiversary	Windsor, Ontario, Canada	1	182	The company reverted to Total Nonstop Action Wrestling.	
Total Nonstop Action Wrestling (TNA)
21	Decay (Havok and Rosemary)	January 13, 2024	Hard To Kill	Paradise, NV	3 (3, 4)	41		
22	MK Ultra (Killer Kelly and Masha Slamovich)	February 23, 2024	No Surrender	Westwego, LA	2	14		
23	Spitfire (Dani Luna and Jody Threat)	March 8, 2024	Sacrifice	Windsor, Ontario, Canada	1	56		
24	The Malisha (Note: Originally won the titles under the team name of "Alisha Edwards and Masha Slamovich".) (Alisha Edwards and Masha Slamovich)	May 3, 2024	Under Siege	Albany, NY	1 (1, 3)	133	In September 2024, Tasha Steelz defended the title once in Edwards' place but was not recognized as champion.	
25	Spitfire (Dani Luna and Jody Threat)	September 13, 2024	Victory Road	San Antonio, TX	2	182	Defeated Masha Slamovich and Tasha Steelz, the latter defended the title on behalf of Alisha Edwards, who was under concussion protocols. Had Spitfire lost, they would have had to disband.	
26	The Elegance Brand (Ash by Elegance, Heather by Elegance, and M by Elegance)	March 14, 2025	Sacrifice	El Paso, TX	1	197	This 3-on-2 handicap match also featured The Elegance Brand's manager, The Personal Concierge. Ash and Heather won the title, while M was recognized as champion via the Freebird Rule.	
27	The IInspiration (Jessie McKay and Cassie Lee)	September 27, 2025	iMPACT!	Edmonton, Alberta, Canada	2	110	Heather by Elegance and M by Elegance represented The Elegance Brand. Aired on tape delay on October 2.	
28	The Elegance Brand (Heather by Elegance and M by Elegance)	January 15, 2026	TNA Impact! premiere on AMC	Garland, TX	2	164		
29	DemonXBunny (Allie, Rosemary, and Kiera Hogan)	June 28, 2026	Slammiversary	Boston, MA	1 (1, 5, 3)	105	Allie and Rosemary initially won the title. On August 23 at Lockdown, Hogan replaced Rosemary after she suffered an injury, where they defeated The Elegance Brand (Heather by Elegance and M by Elegance) in a Steel Cage tag team match; thus, Hogan was also recognized as champion.	
30	Apex (Zoey Serrano and Shayna Baszler)	October 11, 2026	Bound for Glory	Tampa, FL	1	36+		

== Combined reigns ==
As of November 16, 2026.

=== By team ===
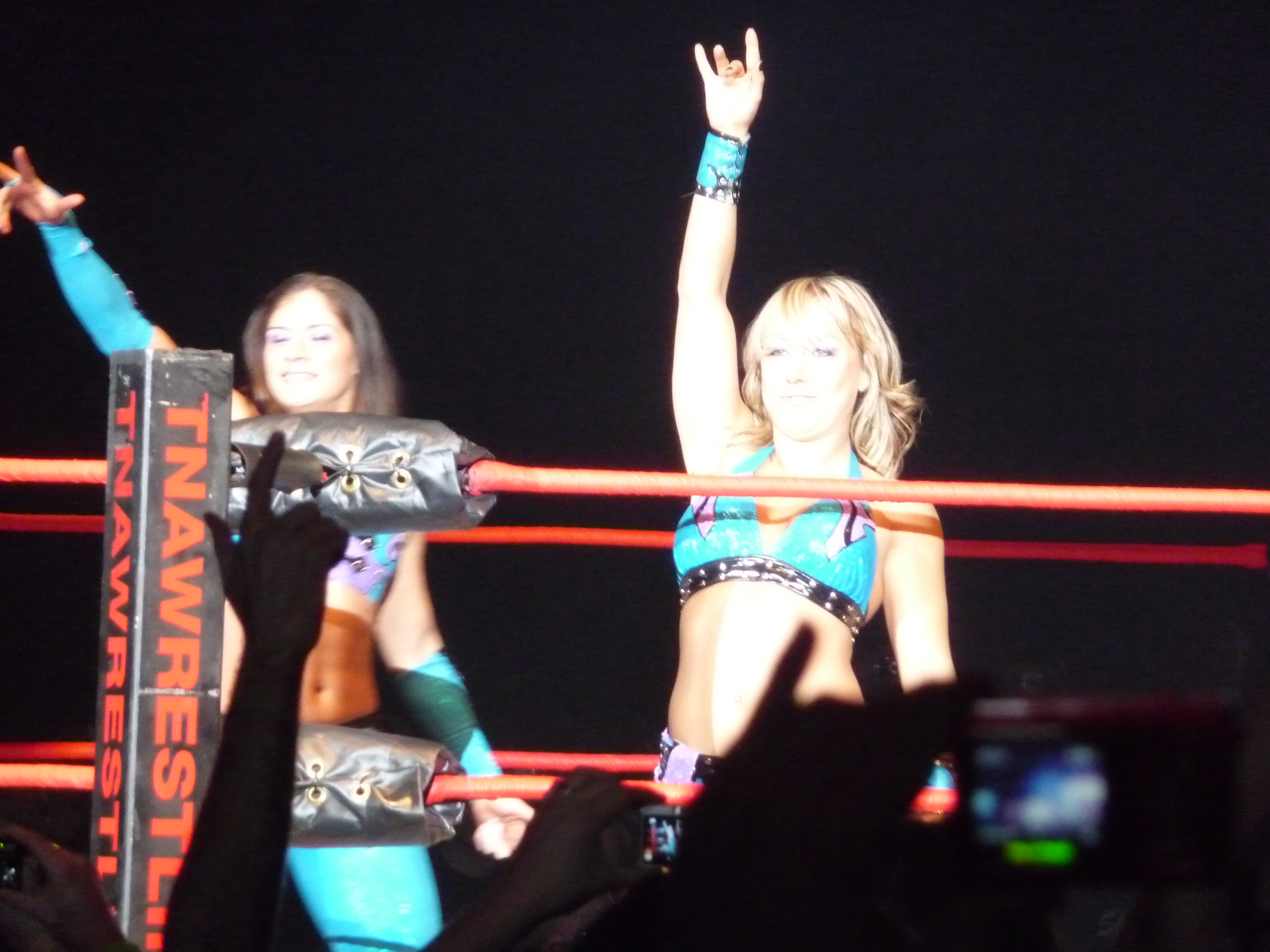
Inaugural champions Sarita and Taylor Wilde

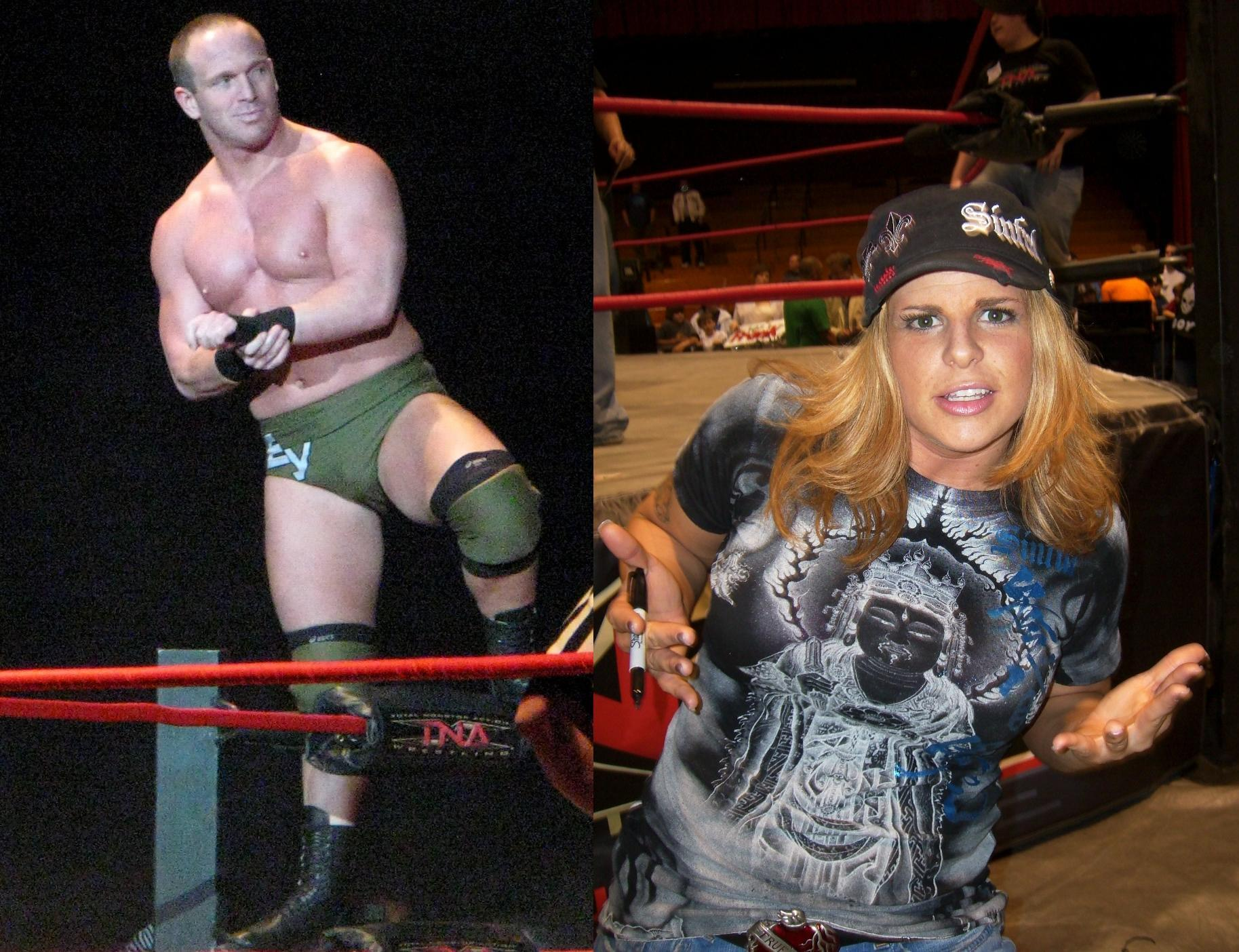
Eric Young (the only male champion) and ODB held the title the longest at 478 days.

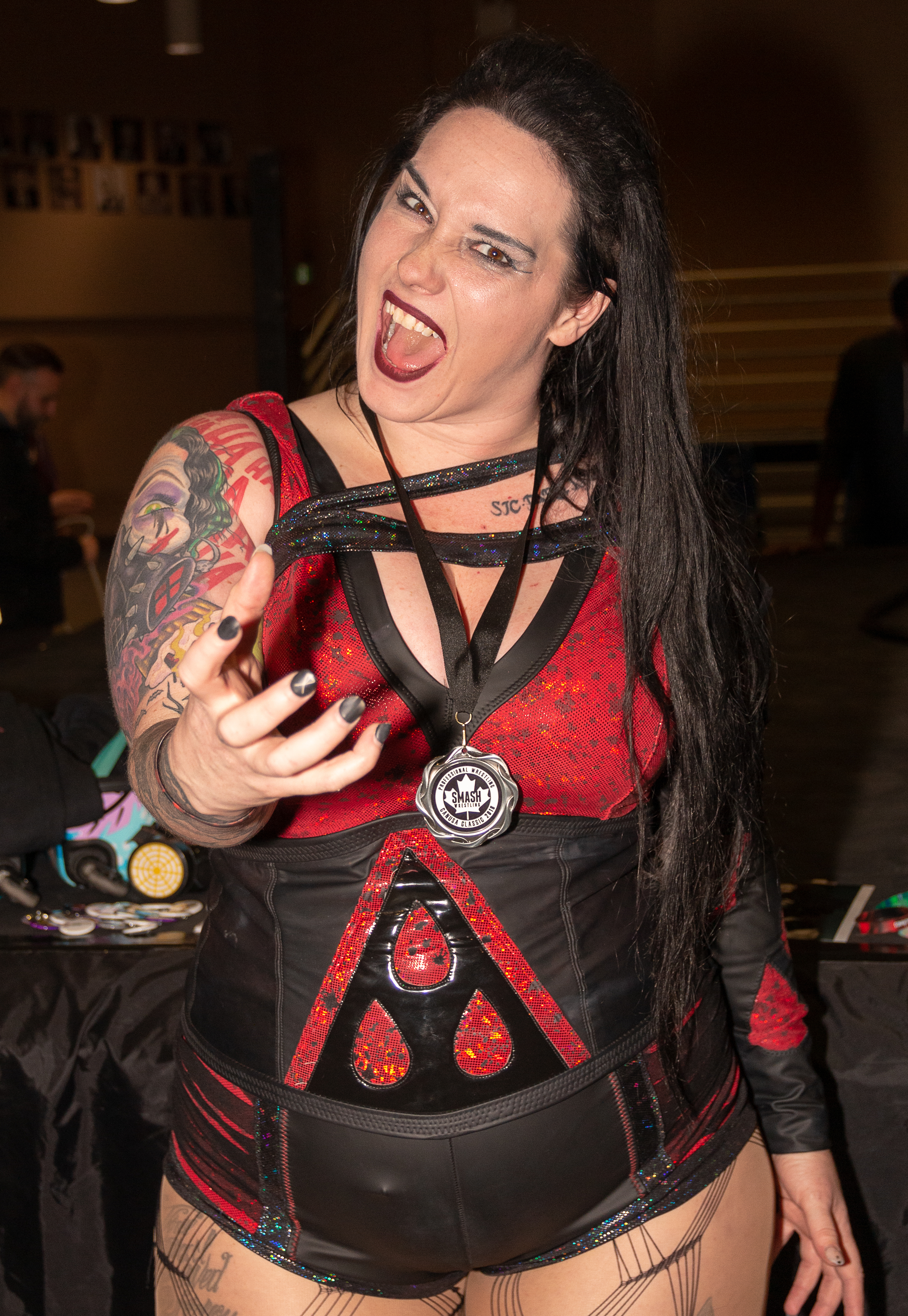
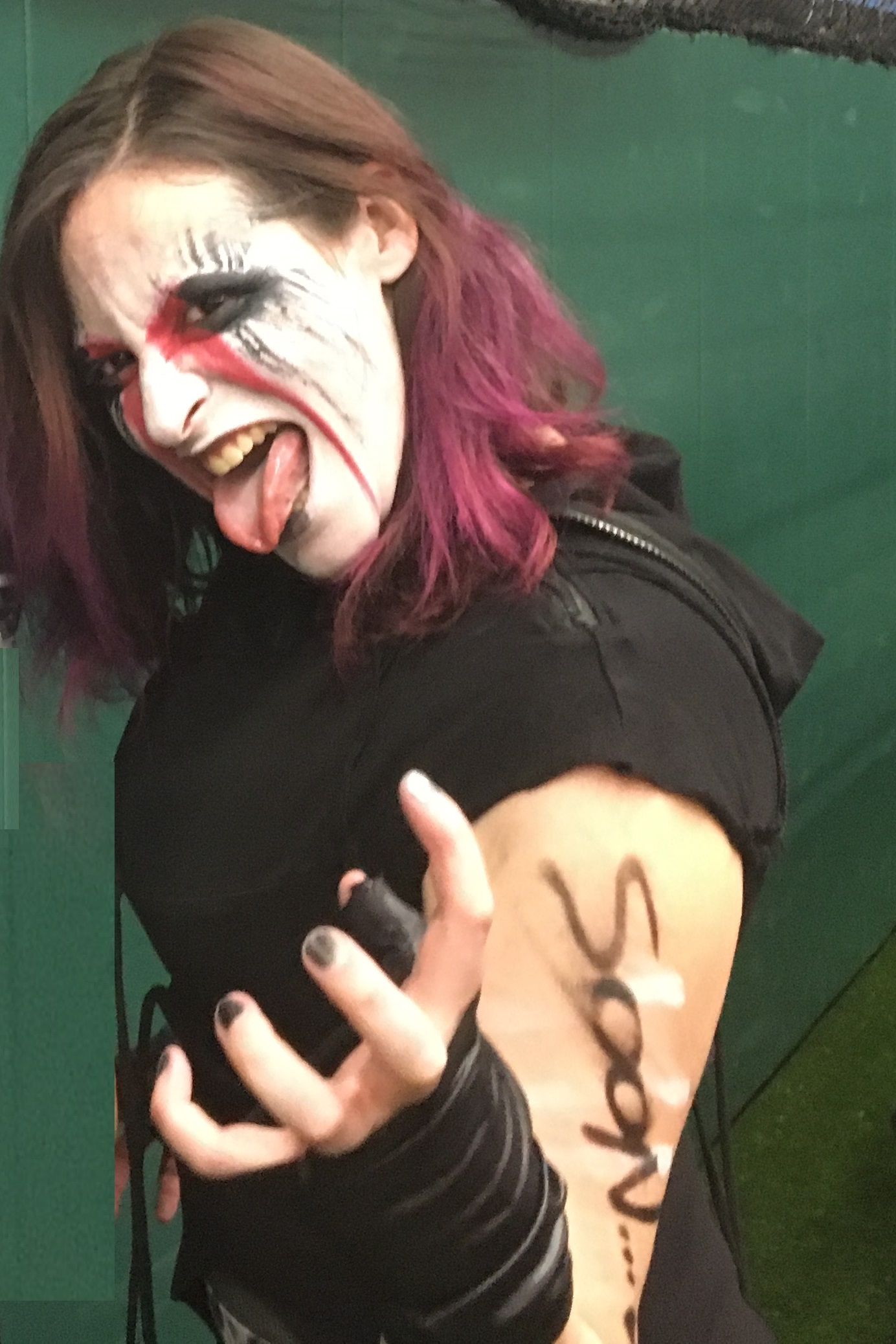
Record-setting 3-time champions The Death Dollz/Decay (Havok and Rosemary)

†	Indicates the current champion

Rank	Team	No. of reigns	Combined days
1	Eric Young and ODB	1	478
2	The Elegance Brand (Reign 1: Ash by Elegance, Heather by Elegance, and M by Elegance); Reign 2: (Heather by Elegance and M by Elegance)	2	361
3	The Death Dollz/Decay (Reigns 1, 3: Havok and Rosemary) (Reigns 2: Jessicka, Rosemary, and Taya Valkyrie)	3	281
4	The IInspiration (Jessie McKay and Cassie Lee)	2	243
5	Spitfire (Dani Luna and Jody Threat)	2	238
6	MK Ultra (Killer Kelly and Masha Slamovich)	2	196
7	Fire 'N Flava (Kiera Hogan and Tasha Steelz)	2	162
8	The Beautiful People (Lacey Von Erich, Madison Rayne, and Velvet Sky)	1	141
9	The Coven (KiLynn King and Taylor Wilde)	1	139
10	The Malisha (Alisha Edwards and Masha Slamovich)	1	133
11	Hamada and Taylor Wilde	1	132
12	Gail Kim and Madison Rayne	1	125
13	Mexican America (Rosita and Sarita)	1	121
14	The Influence (Madison Rayne and Tenille Dashwood)	1	106
14	Sarita and Taylor Wilde	1	106
14	TnT (Brooke Tessmacher and Tara)	1	106
17	DemonXBunny (Allie, Rosemary, and Kiera Hogan)	1	105
18	Angelina Love and Winter	1	94
19	Awesome Kong and Hamada	1	63
20	VXT (Chelsea Green and Deonna Purrazzo)	1	56
21	Rosemary and Taya Valkyrie	1	54
22	Apex † (Zoey Serrano and Shayna Baszler)	1	36+
23	Jordynne Grace and Rachael Ellering	1	20

=== By wrestler ===
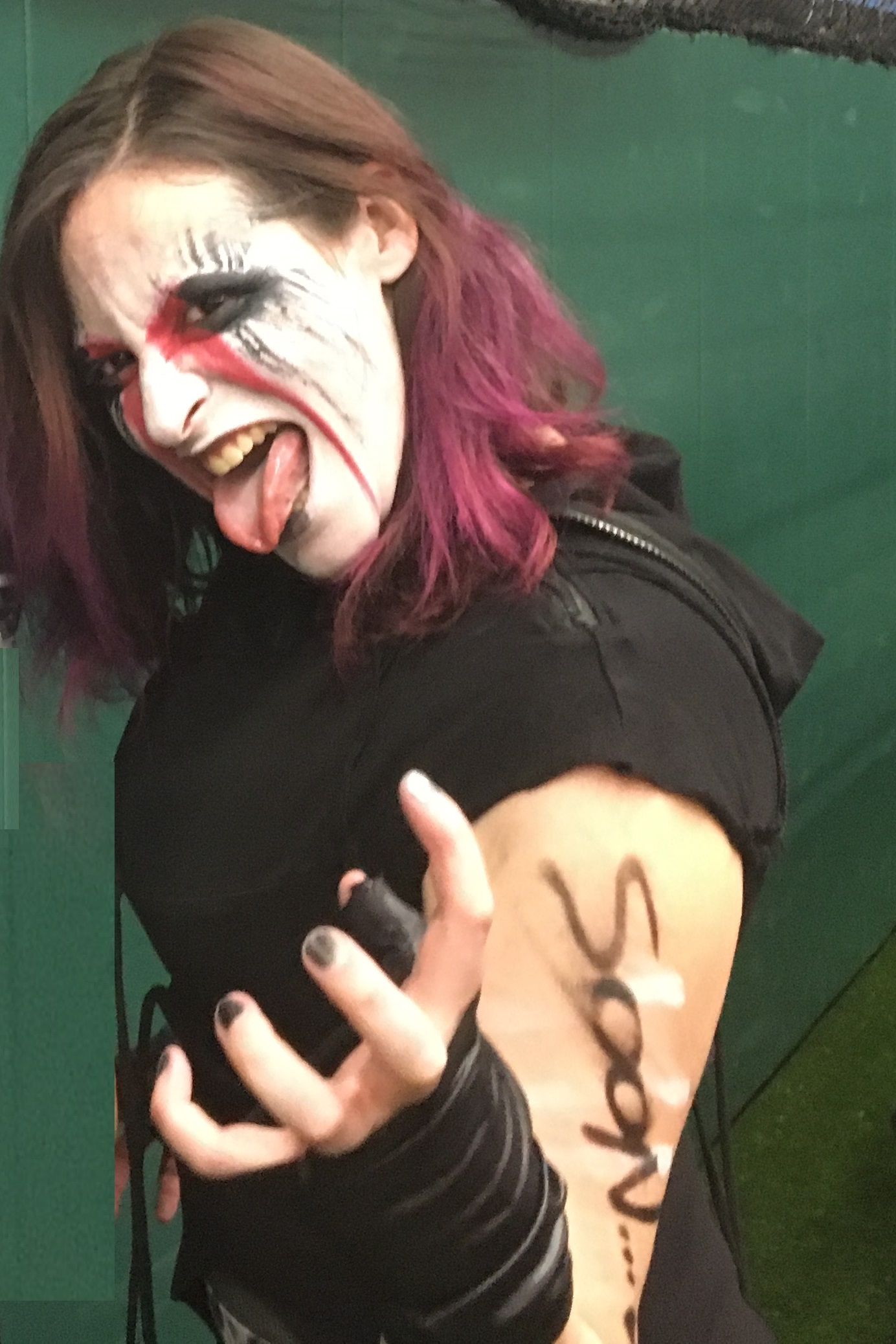
Rosemary has the most individual reigns at five.

Rank	Wrestler	No. of reigns	Combined days
1	Eric Young	1	478
1	ODB	1	478
3	Rosemary	5	440
4	Taylor Wilde	3	377
5	Madison Rayne	3	372
6	Heather by Elegance	2	361
6	M by Elegance	2	361
8	Masha Slamovich	3	329
9	Havok/Jessicka	3	281
10	Cassie Lee	2	243
10	Jessie McKay	2	243
12	Dani Luna	2	238
12	Jody Threat	2	238
14	Sarita	2	227
15	Kiera Hogan	3	211
16	Ash by Elegance	1	197
17	Taya Valkyrie	2	196
17	Killer Kelly	2	196
19	Hamada	2	195
20	Tasha Steelz	2	162
21	Lacey Von Erich	1	141
21	Velvet Sky	1	141
23	KiLynn King	1	139
24	Alisha Edwards	1	133
25	Gail Kim	1	125
26	Rosita	1	121
27	Brooke Tessmacher	1	106
27	Tara	1	106
27	Tenille Dashwood	1	106
30	Allie	1	105
31	Angelina Love	1	94
31	Winter	1	94
33	Awesome Kong	1	63
34	Chelsea Green	1	56
34	Deonna Purrazzo	1	56
36	Shayna Baszler †	1	36+
36	Zoey Serrano †	1	36+
38	Jordynne Grace	1	20
38	Rachael Ellering	1	20

== See also ==
- Women's World Tag Team Championship
