= Slammiversary (2026) =

TNA professional wrestling event

- Promotional poster
- Promotion: Total Nonstop Action Wrestling
- Date: June 28, 2026
- City: Boston, Massachusetts, U.S.
- Venue: Agganis Arena
- Attendance: 2,983

Pay-per-view chronology
← Previous; Rebellion	Next → Lockdown

Slammiversary chronology
← Previous; 2025	Next → —

The 2026 Slammiversary was a professional wrestling pay-per-view event produced by Total Nonstop Action Wrestling (TNA). It took place on Sunday, June 28, 2026, at the Agganis Arena in Boston, Massachusetts, United States. It was the 22nd event under the Slammiversary chronology and celebrated the promotion's 24th anniversary. Following the death of two-time TNA World Tag Team Champion Joe Doering two days earlier, TNA dedicated the event to his memory.

Ten matches were contested at the event, including two on the pre-show. In the main event, Nic Nemeth defeated Mike Santana to win the TNA World Championship. In other prominent matches, Cedric Alexander retained the TNA X Division Championship in a seven-man Ultimate X match, Moose defeated Eddie Edwards in a No Surrender match, Xia Brookside defeated Léi Yǐng Lee to win the TNA Knockouts World Championship, and The Broken Hardys (Broken Matt and Brother Nero) won the TNA World Tag Team Championship in a four-way ladder match. The event also featured the announcements of the TNA Knockouts Television Championship and the inductions of Amazing Red and Konnan into the TNA Hall of Fame at Bound for Glory, as well as the TNA debut of Uhaa Nation, formerly known as Apollo Crews in WWE.

== Production ==
=== Background ===
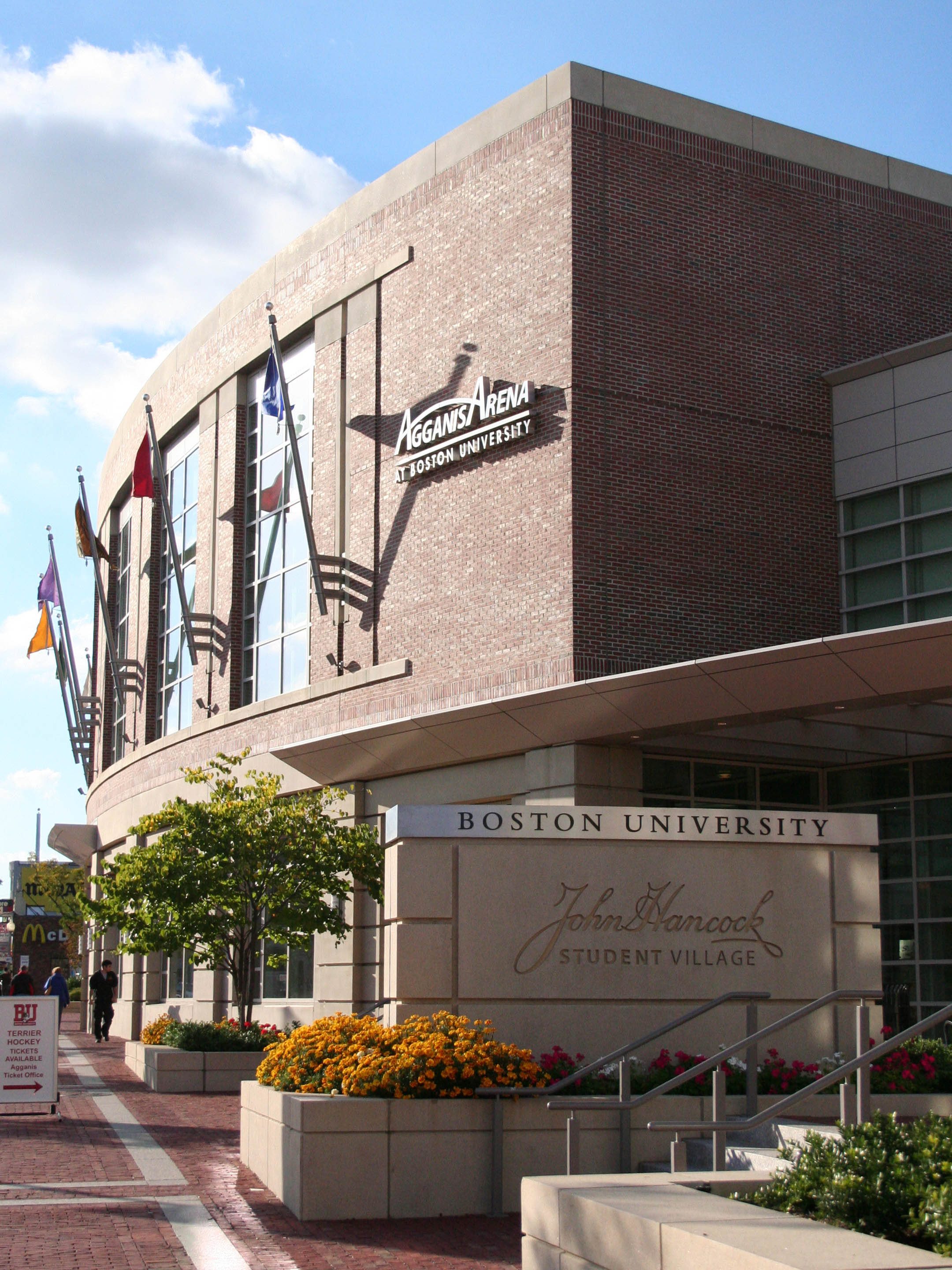
Slammiversary took place at Agganis Arena in Boston, Massachusetts, United States.

Slammiversary is a professional wrestling pay-per-view (PPV) event produced by Total Nonstop Action Wrestling (TNA) to celebrate the anniversary of the company's first event, which was held in June 2002. As such, the event is usually held in the summer (June or July). The first Slammiversary event took place nearly a year after the first TNA event on June 18, 2003, and the event has since been considered one of TNA's premiere PPV events, along with Bound for Glory and Rebellion.

On April 9, 2026, TNA announced its event schedule for the remainder of the year. Included in the announcement was Slammiversary, which was scheduled to take place on Sunday, June 28, at the Agganis Arena in Boston, Massachusetts, United States. In May, TNA announced that Slammiversary would feature a ladder match and all of the promotion's championships at stake.

In addition to airing on traditional pay-per-view worldwide, Slammiversary was available to livestream on TNA+ in the United States. The event was originally scheduled to start at 7:00 p.m. Eastern Daylight Time (EDT) (UTC−4), but it was moved to 4:00 p.m. EDT after it was announced that All Elite Wrestling's Forbidden Door would begin at 8:00 p.m. EDT that same day.

=== Storylines ===
The event featured professional wrestling matches that involved different wrestlers from pre-existing scripted feuds and storylines. Wrestlers portrayed villains, heroes, or less distinguishable characters in scripted events that built tension and culminated in a wrestling match or series of matches.

==== Championship matches ====
On the May 14, 2026, episode of Thursday Night Impact!, TNA announced an Ultimate X match for the TNA X Division Championship at Slammiversary. Later that night, Cedric Alexander defeated X Division Champion Leon Slater two falls to one in a two-out-of-three falls match to win the title, ending Slater's record-tying 298-day reign. On the following week's episode, TNA announced Slater as one of the competitors in the Ultimate X match. The week after, Frankie Kazarian hosted Alexander and Slater on "The King's Speech", where he announced that his entry into the Ultimate X match. The rest of the lineup was filled later that night with the announcement of KC Navarro, Mr. Elegance, and Fabian Aichner as participants. Three days earlier, TNA announced the return of Amazing Red to the promotion for the first time in 15 years at Slammiversary; Red was later added to the Ultimate X match.

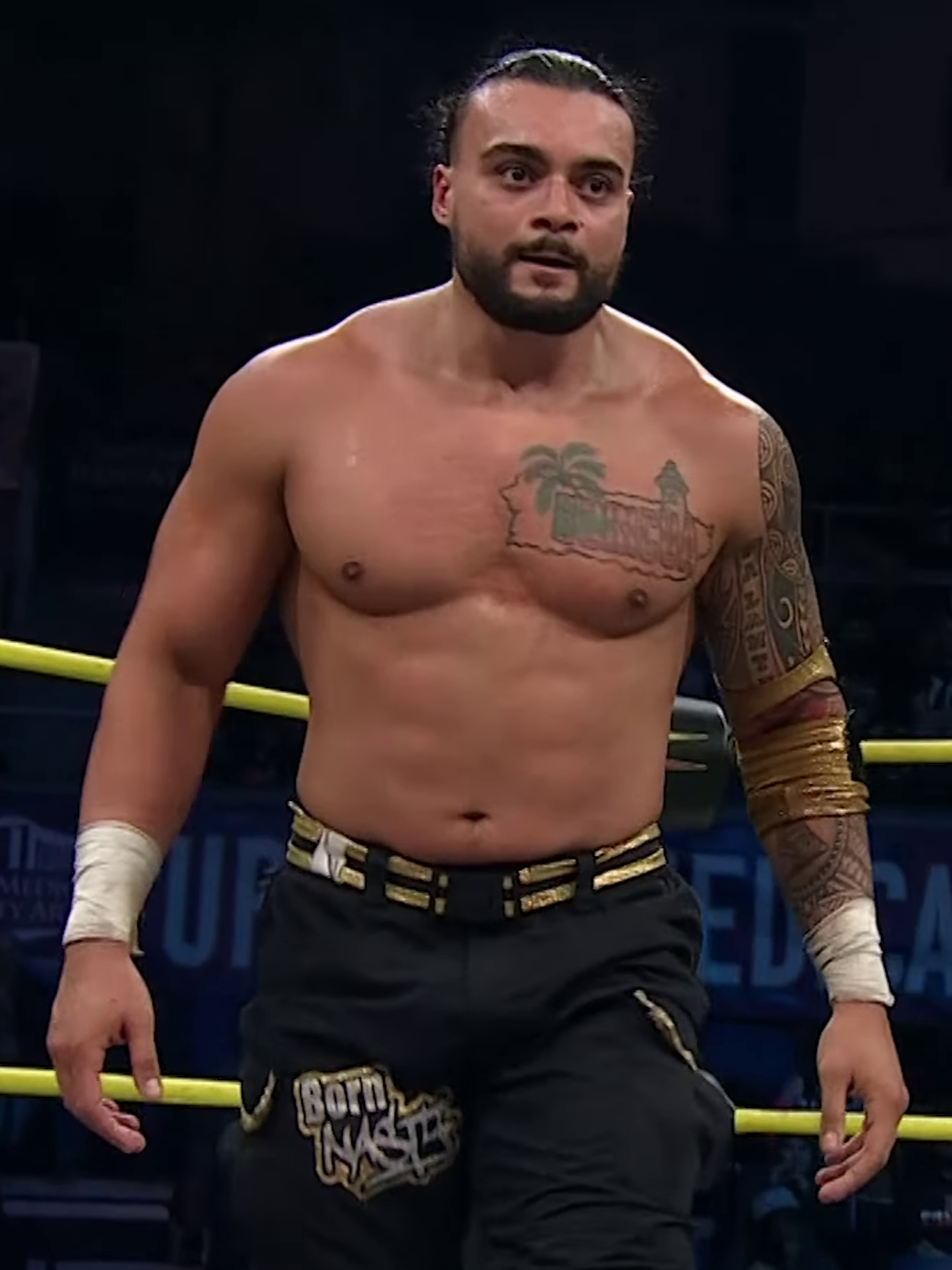
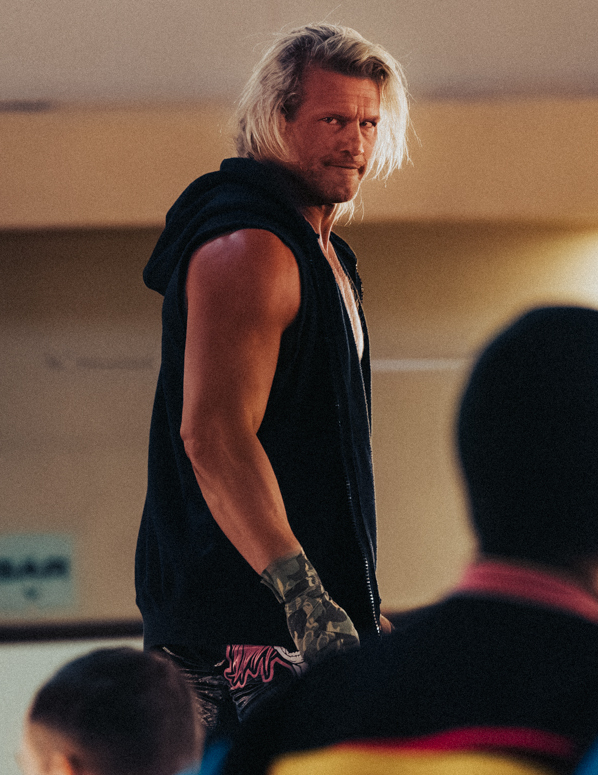
Mike Santana defended the TNA World Championship against Nic Nemeth. This was Nemeth's Call Your Shot championship opportunity.

At Bound for Glory on October 12, 2025, Nic Nemeth and Frankie Kazarian became the co-winners of a 22-person Call Your Shot Gauntlet, each earning the right to challenge for the TNA World Championship at any time of their choosing. After Mike Santana lost the TNA World Championship to Kazarian, who invoked his title opportunity on the November 13 episode of Impact!, he regained the title on Impact!'s premiere on AMC on January 15, 2026; Santana then stopped Nemeth from invoking his title opportunity. Two days later, Nemeth served as the special guest referee in a Texas Deathmatch at Genesis, where Santana retained the title against Kazarian. After the match, Nemeth unsuccessfully tried to invoke his title opportunity again. On June 7, Nemeth invoked his title opportunity to challenge Santana for the TNA World Championship at Slammiversary. On the June 18 episode of Impact!, Santana and Nemeth were forced to team up together along with KC Navarro against Order 4 (TNA International Champion Mustafa Ali, John Skyler, and Jason Hotch), where if Santana and Nemeth been unable to co-exist, Ali would have been added to their match at Slammiversary. After Santana, Nemeth, and Navarro came out victorious, Nic's brother Ryan Nemeth punched Santana. When Santana tried to retaliate, he accidentally hit Navarro instead before getting kicked by Nic.

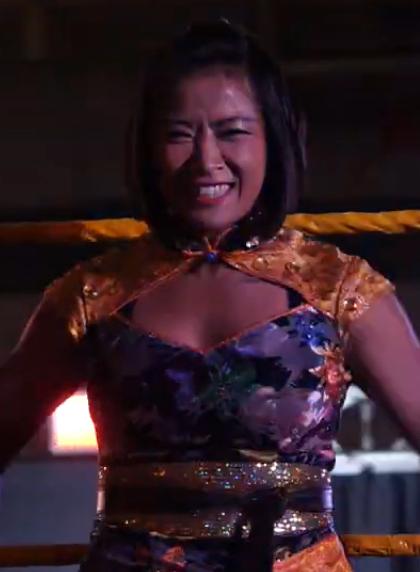
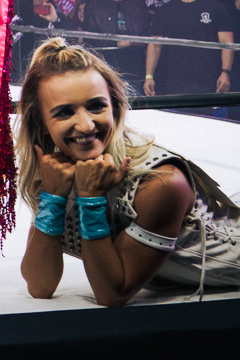
Former best friends, reigning champion Léi Yǐng Lee and Xia Brookside, battled for the TNA Knockouts World Championship.

On the April 2 episode of Impact!, Léi Yǐng Lee showed a good luck video message to Xia Brookside from her father, Robbie Brookside, before Xia challenged Arianna Grace for the TNA Knockouts World Championship. However, Xia failed to dethrone Grace. At Rebellion on April 11, Lee challenged Grace for the title, where Xia betrayed Lee by placing Grace's foot on the ropes to break Lee's pin attempt, and then Grace ultimately retained her title. On the April 23 episode of Impact!, Xia blamed Lee and her father for her failed attempt to win the title. She spoke about the pressures of being a second-generation wrestler and lacking support from her father. Lee clarified that she held no ill intentions, noting that she felt alone until they became friends. Xia accepted the apology and promised not to let the title come between them. As they hugged, Xia suddenly attacked Lee, forcing referees to intervene. On the May 7 episode, Lee defeated Grace to capture the TNA Knockouts World Championship with Xia banned from ringside. Three weeks later, Xia, Elayna Black, and Mara Sadè defeated Lee and TNA Knockouts World Tag Team Champions The Elegance Brand (Heather by Elegance and M by Elegance) in a Champions Challenge after Xia pinned Lee, earning the right to challenge for the TNA Knockouts World Championship. On June 11, Lee versus Xia for the title at Slammiversary was made official.

At Sacrifice on March 27, The System (Cedric Alexander and Brian Myers) battled Jeff Hardy and Vincent. During the match, Vincent's The Righteous partner Dutch appeared via video, standing over a bloody Matt Hardy, Jeff's brother and The Hardys partner. The distraction allowed The System to attack Jeff and win the match. On the April 9 episode of Impact!, TNA World Tag Team Champions The Hardys defeated The Righteous in a tag team elimination tables match. Two days later at Rebellion, The System (Bear Bronson and Brian Myers) defeated The Hardys to win the titles. On the April 16 episode of Impact!, Matt thanked Dutch for "sacrificing" him at Sacrifice, stating that the "near-death experience" made him feel alive. The following week, Dutch defeated Matt and continued to attack him as Vincent watched until Jeff came out to save his brother. Jeff defeated Vincent the following week after Matt appeared as Broken Matt, turning the lights off to knock out Vincent. On the May 21 episode, Broken Matt and Vincent battled while Jeff, now as Brother Nero, and Dutch were handcuffed to the ropes. When Vincent stole the handcuff keys, the lights turned off and Jeff reappeared as Willow when the lights turned back on. He hit Vincent with an umbrella before disappearing when the lights turned off again, which allowed Matt to pin Vincent. On the June 4 episode, The Righteous defeated The Hardys in a Wicked Garden match after Vincent force fed Jeff a lily-of-the-valley, poisoning him (in kayfabe or in the storyline), and then pinned Matt. On June 11, TNA announced Bronson and Myers' title defense against The Righteous and The Hardys at Slammiversary. A week later, Vincent explained that poisoning Jeff showed that "even legends decay". Vincent stated that they have dispatched The Hardys and diverted their attention to winning the TNA World Tag Team Championship. TNA Director of Authority Santino Marella declared the reigning champions The System versus The Righteous versus The Hardys in a triple threat ladder match for the TNA World Tag Team Championship at Slammiversary. On the June 25 episode, TNA Director of Operations Daria Rae added The Great Hands (Jason Hotch and John Skyler) to the match, turning it into a four-way ladder match.

On the May 21 episode of Impact!, The Elegance Brand found a "See you soon" message written in lipstick on a mirror from Rosemary, Mara Sadè, and Allie. On the June 11 episode, Rosemary, Sadè, and Allie defeated The Elegance Brand (Ash by Elegance, Heather by Elegance, and M by Elegance) in a six-woman tag team match. During the match, Rosemary, Sadè, and Allie manipulated a doll bearing Ash's image, like a voodoo doll, to hurt her. Later that night, Heather and M were scheduled to defend the TNA Knockouts World Tag Team Championship against Rosemary and Allie at Slammiversary.

On the June 18 episode of Impact!, TNA announced that Mustafa Ali was scheduled to defend the TNA International Championship in an open challenge at Slammiversary.

==== Other matches ====
On the January 22 episode of Impact!, Eddie Edwards, Brian Myers, Bear Bronson, and Cedric Alexander kicked Moose and JDC out of The System. Eddie's wife, Alisha Edwards, disagreed with them and left the stable. Moose began a mission to take down every member of The System. Over the following weeks, Moose defeated Alexander, Myers, and Bronson individually. At Sacrifice, Moose was slated to battle Eddie, but Order 4's Special Agent 0 attacked Moose, disqualifying Eddie. At Rebellion, Eddie challenged Mike Santana for the TNA World Championship. An injured Alisha came out to ringside on crutches. Moose revealed that Alisha was faking her injury and secretly colluded with The System. Moose then helped Santana fend off The System and retain his title. On the May 7 episode of Impact!, Moose and Leon Slater was victorious against Eddie and Alexander after Moose pinned Eddie. On the June 11 episode, Moose announced that TNA Director of Authority Santino Marella made Moose versus Eddie at Slammiversary official. Two weeks later, Moose and JDC came to the ring as the former announced that that the match would be contested as a No Surrender Rules match.

On the April 9 episode of Impact!, Eric Young, the self-proclaimed gatekeeper of TNA, called Ricky Sosa a wannabee. They got into a brawl that ended when Young hit Sosa with a piledriver. Two months later on June 11, Young challenged Mike Santana for the TNA World Championship, but Young lost after a distraction by Sosa. A match between Young and Sosa was then made official for Slammiversary. The match was later moved to the Countdown to Slammiversary show.

On the May 21 episode of Impact!, A. J. Francis pitched a music collaboration to Elijah. Elijah refused, preferring being solo, before walking away as Francis threatened that he would regret his decision. Two weeks later, Francis debuted his new song featuring a guitar piece by Elijah, who interrupted his performance upon hearing his guitar strum. Francis then handed Elijah a cease and desist order, revealing his acquisition of the rights to Elijah's name, likeness, and music catalog. Elijah tried to debut his new song "Don't Steal, Uncle Phil", but Francis punched him before he could start. On the June 18 episode, a Behind the Music-style vignette aired, where Francis stated that he believed his life purpose was to prevent people like Elijah who did not deserve to have their own music. He further stated his hope to be an inspiration for owning other people's rights. On June 22, TNA announced that Francis versus Elijah at Slammiversary.

On June 25, TNA announced Indi Hartwell versus Mara Sadè versus Elayna Black in a triple threat match on the Countdown to Slammiversary show.

== Event ==
Other on-screen personnel
Role	Name
Commentators	Tom Hannifan
Commentators	Matthew Rehwoldt
Ring announcer	McKenzie Mitchell
Referees	Daniel Spencer
Referees	Frank Gastineau
Referees	Paige Prinzivalli
Interviewer	Gia Miller
Pre-show panel	Tom Hannifan
Pre-show panel	Matthew Rehwoldt
Pre-show panel	Daria Rae
Pre-show panel	Ace Steel

=== Pre-show ===
The pre-show opened with a triple threat match between Elayna Black, Indi Hartwell, and Mara Sadè, where the three wrestlers competed under standard rules with the first competitor to achieve a pinfall or submission gets declared the winner. When Sadè attempted to pin Hartwell, Black pulled Sadè off the cover before hitting her with "Blackout", hooking Sadè's arms before lifting and rotating her back down, to score the pinfall victory.

Following the match, TNA Hall of Famer Traci Brooks announced a tournament featuring 16 Knockouts to crown the inaugural TNA Knockouts Television Champion, a title that would be exclusively defended on Thursday Night Impact!. She stated that the tournament was scheduled to begin on the following episode of Impact!. TNA Director of Authority Santino Marella also announced that Mustafa Ali would defend the TNA International Championship in a triple threat match with his opponents set to be announced later that night.

Next, Eric Young battled Ricky Sosa. After Young missed a dive, Sosa hit the "Blue Thunder Bang", lifting Sosa up with one arm before spinning him around 180° and dropping him to the mat, to win the match via pinfall.

=== Preliminary matches ===
The event opened with a 10-bell salute in honor of Joe Doering, who died two days earlier. Cody Deaner said that Doering considered his friends as "friends for life". He spoke about Doering's love for professional wrestling. He recalled working with Doering after doctors removed a cancerous tumor and informed him of the end of his career. Deaner said that Doering exemplified having the passion to accomplish their desires. He shared that he spent time with Doering a few weeks before Doering's death. Deaner then dedicated the 2026 edition of Slammiversary to Doering.

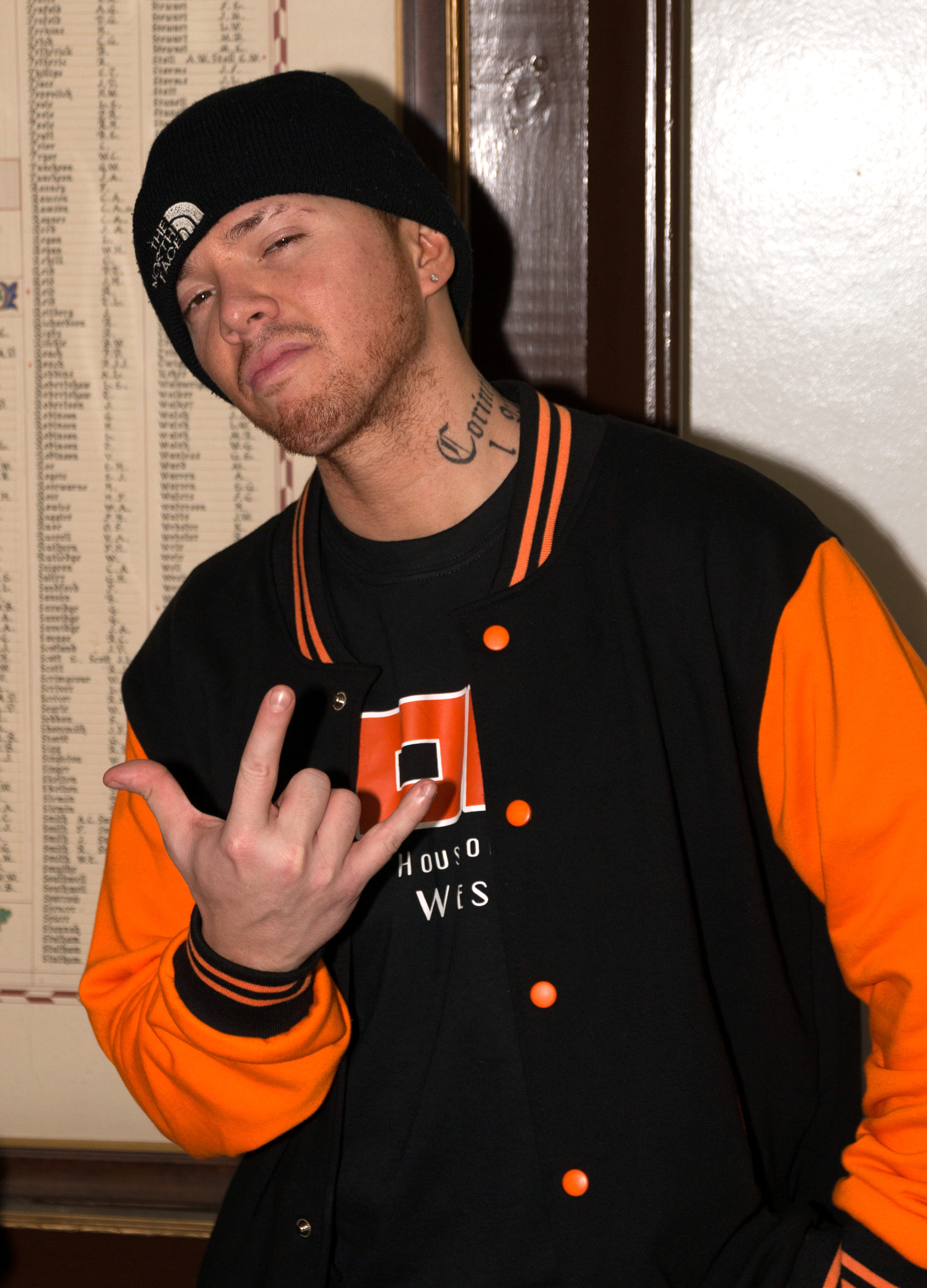
Amazing Red made his return to TNA after 15 years. After his match, he was announced as the new inductee of the TNA Hall of Fame.

The opening match was the Ultimate X match for the TNA X Division Championship, featuring defending champion Cedric Alexander, Amazing Red, Fabian Aichner, Frankie Kazarian, KC Navarro, Leon Slater, and Mr. Elegance. The only way to win the match was to pull down the red "X" in the intersection of two cables above the ring that were attached to four trusses from the corners of the ring. While the other competitors were incapacitated early, Elegance scaled the cables but was pulled down after he began to showboat. Kazarian scaled the cables, but Aichner caught him with a springboard crossbody, bouncing on the ropes before landing horizontally across Kazarian's torso. In the final moments of the match, Slater and Red simultaneously scaled the ropes and unhooked the championship belt, Alexander then grabbed the title to win the match and retain his title.

After the match, Frankie Kazarian offered his respect to Amazing Red. A video package played, which officially announced Red's induction into the TNA Hall of Fame.

Next, A. J. Francis, who was accompanied by his manager Expressions, and Elijah fought for the ownership of Elijah's name, likeness, and music catalog. While Francis distracted the official, Expressions attacked Elijah. Eiljah executed a "Tombstone Piledriver", in which Elijah dropped to his knees while holding Francis upside down to drive Francis' head into the mat, but Francis kicked out, marking the first time a TNA wrestler survived the move. Elijah then stopped Expressions from interfering with a guitar. Expressions offered a bribe, but Elijah struck him over the head with the guitar instead. Francis almost got the win by surprising a distracted Elijah with a pinfall attempt, but Francis failed. Elijah later connected with the "Canadian Destroyer", flipping Francis over and landing in a seated position to drive Francis' head down to the mat, to win the match via pinfall. After the match, Elijah revealed a custom guitar fitted with lights.

In the third match, The Elegance Brand (Heather by Elegance and M by Elegance), accompanied by their stablemate Ash by Elegance and manager The Personal Concierge, defended the TNA Knockouts World Tag Team Championship against DemonXBunny (Rosemary and Allie). When Rosemary attempted a pinfall, Ash interfered; Rosemary pursued Ash, who retreated behind Concierge, which prompted Rosemary to blind him with green mist. As Rosemary suffered a combined attack by The Elegance Brand, Rosemary evaded a double stomp from Heather, which caused M to get hit instead. Allie then hit Heather with the "Codebreaker", forcing Heather to fall forwards onto Allie's knees face-first, and then Rosemary followed with a reverse DDT, droving Heather's head into the mat as Heather fell forward, to score the pinfall and win the title.

The TNA International Championship was on the line next with Mustafa Ali, accompanied by Order 4 stablemate Tasha Steelz, defending the title against Rich Swann and the debuting Uhaa Nation, formerly known as Apollo Crews in WWE, in a triple threat match. As Nation had the momentum, Steelz distracted him on the ring apron, and then Order 4 member Special Agent 0 appeared, which prompted Nation to confront him. Ali capitalized on the distraction with a dive to the outside onto Nation. Agent 0 then hit Nation with the steel steps. Ali then countered an attack from Swann with a backslide, hooking both of Swann's arms before sliding Swann down to his back, to get the pinfall victory and retain his title.

The fifth match was the No Surrender match between Moose, who was accompanied by JDC, and Eddie Edwards, who was accompanied by his wife Alisha Edwards, where Moose would win if Alisha threw a towel into the ring to surrender on behalf of Eddie and Eddie would win if JDC did it on behalf of Moose. Before Moose could enter the ring, Eddie kicked Moose, prompting the referee to officially begin the match. Eddie later locked Moose's wrists to a ring rope using zip-ties. Moose's wife took JDC's towel to try to stop the match, but JDC intervened. Eddie then grabbed her hair and shoved her down; JDC tried to assist Moose's wife but Eddie punched him instead. Eddie then brought Moose's son to the ring to taunt Moose, but his son hit Eddie's groin and then Moose's wife slapped Alisha. Moose broke free and hit Edwards with two consecutive spears, charging at Eddie with his shoulder into Eddie's midsection to force Eddie down. JDC then gave Moose a steel chain, which Moose wrapped around his shoulder before connecting with another spear; Eddie's mouth began to bleed. As Moose prepared for another spear on Eddie through a table, Alisha threw in the towel, officially forfeiting the match on Eddie's behalf and handing the win to Moose. After the match, JDC prevented Moose from continuing the assault before attacking Eddie himself. Moose then executed a spear on both Eddie and Alisha through a table before celebrating with his family and JDC.

Next, Léi Yǐng Lee defended the TNA Knockouts World Championship against Xia Brookside. Brookside evaded a kick on the outside, causing Lee to strike her foot against the ring post; Brookside began to target Lee's leg. Lee later pulled Brookside away from the corner, and as Brookside resisted, she inadvertently removed the turnbuckle pad. Lee continued to limp as she advanced towards the ropes. Brookside tried to blindside her, but Lee blocked it; which caused Brookside to rebound off the ropes and pushed Lee face-first into the exposed turnbuckle. Brookside then followed with a DDT for a successful pinfall to capture the title.

The penultimate match was a four-way ladder match for the TNA World Tag Team Championship, where the championship belts were hung above the ring and the tag team that the first competitor that climbed a ladder and retrieved the titles belonged to would be deemed the winners. It featured the defending champions The System (Bear Bronson and Brian Myers), The Broken Hardys (Broken Matt and Brother Nero), The Righteous (Vincent and Dutch), and The Great Hands (John Skyler and Jason Hotch). The competitors set up two ladders in the ring and stacked four tables on the outside. The Righteous brought out the "Wicked Garden" ladder, a ladder covered with barbed wire and flowers. Bronson tried to fend them off and placed a ladder upside down in the corner. He then attempted to slam Vincent, but Dutch slammed Bronson onto the "Wicked Garden" ladder instead twice. Vincent later blinded Myers with a "poisonous" flower (in kayfabe or in the story), causing him to fall off a ladder. As Bronson and Dutch exchanged strikes on a ladder, The Broken Hardys tipped the ladder over, which caused Bronson and Dutch to crash through the stacked tables. As The Great Hands were placed on a bridged ladder, Nero then executed the "Swanton Bomb" off the top of a ladder onto The Good Hands, performing a front somersault before landing on The Good Hands back-first. The Broken Hardys then climbed the ladder and unhooked the title belts to win the TNA World Tag Team Championship.

Before the main event, a video package played of Mike Santana announcing Konnan's induction into the TNA Hall of Fame.

=== Main event ===
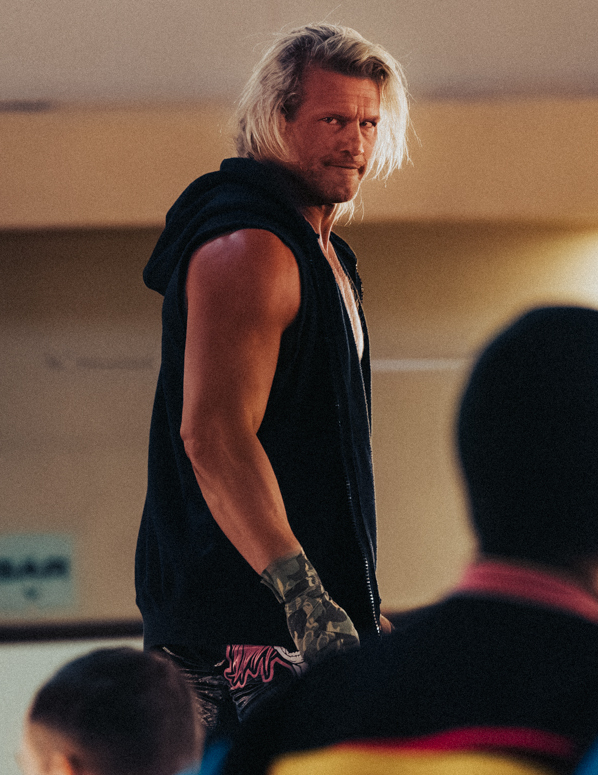
Call Your Shot Gauntlet winner Nic Nemeth successfully reclaimed the TNA World Championship.

In the main event, Mike Santana defended the TNA World Championship against Call Your Shot winner Nic Nemeth. Ryan Nemeth appeared on the apron to taunt Santana. As Santana was distracted while the referee was ejecting Ryan, Nic hit Santana with the Call Your Shot trophy. Nic then applied a sleeper hold as Santana began to bleed. Nic later blocked Santana by kicking Santana's chin. Nic then attempted a pinfall, but Santana kicked out at one, which infuriated Nic. Distracted by his rage, Nic was ambushed with a kick from Santana. Santana then successfully connected with the "Spin the Block", spinning around before knocking Nic down with an outstretched arm. Santana's bleeding took a significant toll on him as his legs gave out, rendering him unable to capitalize on his attack. but his legs gave out due to blood loss. Nic took the advantage by executing the "Danger Zone", leaping from behind to grab Santana's head and pull Santana down. Nic then pinned Santana to win the TNA World Championship.

== Reception ==
On June 29, 2026, WrestleTix reported an estimate of 2,983 tickets distributed at the Agganis Arena in Boston, Massachusetts, United States, for the 2026 edition of Slammiversary.

=== Critical reception ===
Professional ratings
Publication		Matches										Overall	Ref.
Publication		1^{P}	2^{P}	3	4	5	6	7	8	9	10	Overall	Ref.
411Mania	Ryan Ciocco	—N/a	—N/a	4/5	2.5/5	3.5/5	3.25/5	3.75/5	3.5/5	4/5	3.75/5	8.2/10	
411Mania	Thomas Hall	C	C+	B	C+	B–	B	B–	C+	B–	B	8.0/10	
Bleacher Report		C	C+	B	C+	B–	B+	B	B	A	B+	B+	
Súper Luchas		—N/a	—N/a	4/5	3/5	3/5	3.75/5	2.75/5	3.25/5	3.5/5	3.75/5	3.25/5	
Match order: 1. Pre-show: Elayna Black vs. Indi Hartwell vs. Mara Sadè in a triple threat match; 2. Pre-show: Eric Young vs. Ricky Sosa; 3. Cedric Alexander (c) vs. Amazing Red vs. Fabian Aichner vs. Frankie Kazarian vs. KC Navarro vs. Leon Slater vs. Mr. Elegance in an Ultimate X match for the TNA X Division Championship; 4. A. J. Francis vs. Elijah; 5. The Elegance Brand (Heather by Elegance and M by Elegance) (c) vs. DemonXBunny (Rosemary and Allie) for the TNA Knockouts World Tag Team Championship; 6. Mustafa Ali (c) vs. Rich Swann vs. Uhaa Nation in a triple threat match for the TNA International Championship; 7. Eddie Edwards vs. Moose in a No Surrender match; 8. Léi Yǐng Lee (c) vs. Xia Brookside for the TNA Knockouts World Championship; 9. The System (Brian Myers and Bear Bronson) (c) vs. The Broken Hardys (Broken Matt and Brother Nero) vs. The Great Hands (Jason Hotch and John Skyler) vs. The Righteous (Vincent and Dutch); 10. Mike Santana (c) vs. Nic Nemeth for the TNA World Championship

Ryan Ciocco of 411Mania felt that Slammiversary "overdelivered". Thomas Hall of 411Mania similarly viewed the event as "strong enough", noting that TNA made most of the correct creative choices. Erik Beaston of Bleacher Report commended the roster for delivering a "damn fine show" in spite of creative changes and talent departures. Conversely, Rafael Indi of Súper Luchas was more critical towards none of the matches exceeding 20 minutes due to airtime conflicts with both WWE NXT's The Great American Bash and All Elite Wrestling's Forbidden Door. While Indi argued these time limitations ultimately kept several matches from reaching their full potential, he nonetheless conceded that the show "more than delivered" by shaking up TNA's landscape in classic Slammiversary fashion.

Hall dubbed the Ultimate X match a "hot way to start the show", praising the performance of the returning Amazing Red. Beaston similarly characterized it as a "strong" showcase for "immensely talented stars". Ciocco called it a "fantastic choice" to kick off the event, though he noted that he wished it had been given more time. Agreeing with that sentiment, Indi argued that a ten-minute runtime was insufficient for the competitors to deliver a truly "good fight".

Regarding the match between A. J. Francis and Elijah, Beaston praised the overbooked contest as a "hella fun" match that exceeded expectations. Hall was more reserved, finding the bout "perfectly fine" while noting that the build-up leading into the event felt too brief. In contrast, Ciocco argued that the action moved "in slow motion" and expressed frustration with the interferences by Expressions, ultimately contending that the short-lived feud should have been concluded on an episode of Thursday Night Impact! instead.

Beaston praised the TNA Knockouts World Tag Team Championship match as a "good, fun, quality match" that delivered a great title-win moment. Ciocco noted that DemonXBunny’s championship victory came as no surprise given the strong momentum the duo had built since Allie's return. However, Indi was frustrated that the match was given nearly the same runtime as the Ultimate X match.

Beaston lauded the TNA International Championship match's tempo, hailing it as the "best match of the night to this point". Ciocco similarly noted that the short contest proved to be a highly effective outing, while Hall viewed the booking as a "good way" to showcase the debuting Uhaa Nation while still keeping the title on Mustafa Ali. Indi also commended the competitors for their ability to deliver a strong performance and keep a brief match from becoming mediocre, though he reiterated his frustration with the show's strict limitations on match lengths.

Ciocco described the No Surrender match as a "pretty good match" packed with dramatic beats, highlighting Eddie Edwards' successful quest to defeat every member of The System. Beaston similarly praised the "sports-entertainment heavy" presentation, noting that strong character work overcame the familiar history between the competitors. In contrast, Hall argued that the bout lacked a sufficiently "extreme moment" to justify throwing in the towel. Hall also felt the inclusion of Moose’s family diluted the match's impact, as they had barely been featured prior to the event.

Both Ciocco and Beaston highlighted the TNA Knockouts World Championship match's strong narrative work, pointing to Léi Yǐng Lee's aggression, Xia Brookside's desperation, and Brookside's focused attack on Lee's damaged knee. Indi agreed that both competitors told a sensible story – even while noting the division was in "one of their worst moments" – though he criticized the finish that had the new champion cheat, expressing concern that the tactic would become a recurring pattern in Brookside's title defenses. Hall similarly disliked the abrupt ending and felt that Brookside targeting Lee's leg ultimately went nowhere, yet he still commended Brookside's title victory, framing it as a necessary win after several setbacks. Beaston ultimately suggested TNA line up a rematch, writing that both women were capable of delivering an even stronger performance.

Beaston enthusiastically described the TNA World Tag Team Championship match as "wild, chaotic, and violent", pointing to Brother Nero’s "Swanton Bomb" onto The Great Hands as the "perfect exclamation point". Ciocco likewise commended the match and historic title victory, though he questioned the logic of having The Broken Hardys drop the belts to The System only to win them right back. Indi felt the match itself was "fun", but deemed the final result "completely unnecessary", concluding that TNA was merely wringing as much value as possible from The Broken Hardys. Beaston argued that The Righteous should have won instead as their window of opportunity was closed, while Hall dismissed The System as "completely useless" and criticized the continuation of the Broken Hardys' feud with The Righteous, questioning how it was the company's best option.

Beaston lauded the main event for its logical storytelling, clean finish, and lack of overbooking. He praised Nic Nemeth as an "outstanding worker" and an excellent choice for champion, while naming Mike Santana the event's "most valuable player" and calling him the "face of the company in 2026" and the "best pure babyface worker in wrestling". Hall similarly viewed it as a good match that highlighted Santana's rapid rise, though he less enthusiastically dismissed Nemeth as a "placeholder" champion. Ciocco likewise termed the encounter a "great match", though he noted that the final result was "fairly obvious".

== Aftermath ==
The Elegance Brand (Heather by Elegance and M by Elegance) received their rematch for the TNA Knockouts World Tag Team Championship against DemonXBunny (Rosemary and Allie) on the July 30 episode of Thursday Night Impact!, but Allie defended the title in a 2-on-1 handicap match due to the absence of Rosemary. The match ended in a disqualification after Allie began hitting The Elegance Brand, including Mr. Elegance, with the title belt. Thus, DemonXBunny retained the title. Later that night, TNA Director of Operations Daria Rae announced a Steel Cage match between DemonXBunny and The Elegance Brand for the TNA Knockouts World Tag Team Championship at Lockdown.

On the July 23 episode of Impact!, A. J. Francis and Frankie Kazarian defeated Elijah and Moose after Francis' manager Expressions caused Elijah to fall off the ropes and get hit and pinned by Francis. After the match, Expressions tried to hit Elijah with a guitar, but Moose stopped him and Elijah before Elijah and him attacked Expressions instead. The following week, Francis solicited money for Expression's medical bills from various wrestlers, including Elijah, who did not make a donation as he accused of Francis being a hypocrite who wears expensive shoes. Francis then challenged Elijah to a Steel Cage match at Lockdown, which Elijah accepted.

== Results ==
No.	Results	Stipulations	Times
1^{P}	Elayna Black defeated Indi Hartwell and Mara Sadè by pinfall	Triple threat match	5:02
2^{P}	Ricky Sosa defeated Eric Young by pinfall	Singles match	6:03
3	Cedric Alexander (c) defeated Amazing Red, Fabian Aichner, Frankie Kazarian, KC Navarro, Leon Slater, and Mr. Elegance	Ultimate X match for the TNA X Division Championship	10:27
4	Elijah defeated A. J. Francis (with Expressions) by pinfall	Singles match Had Elijah lost, Francis would have owned his name, likeness, and music catalog.	9:10
5	DemonXBunny (Rosemary and Allie) defeated The Elegance Brand (Heather by Elegance and M by Elegance) (c) (with Ash by Elegance and The Personal Concierge) by pinfall	Tag team match for the TNA Knockouts World Tag Team Championship	9:39
6	Mustafa Ali (c) (with Tasha Steelz) defeated Rich Swann and Uhaa Nation by pinfall	Three-way match for the TNA International Championship; This was an open challenge.	9:39
7	Moose (with JDC) defeated Eddie Edwards (with Alisha Edwards)	No Surrender match	13:00
8	Xia Brookside defeated Léi Yǐng Lee (c) by pinfall	Singles match for the TNA Knockouts World Championship	11:55
9	The Broken Hardys (Broken Matt and Brother Nero) defeated The System (Brian Myers and Bear Bronson) (c), The Great Hands (Jason Hotch and John Skyler), and The Righteous (Vincent and Dutch)	Four-way ladder match for the TNA World Tag Team Championship	17:12
10	Nic Nemeth defeated Mike Santana (c) by pinfall	Singles match for the TNA World Championship; This was Nemeth's Call Your Shot title opportunity.	14:47
(c) / – the champion(s) heading into the match; P / – the match was broadcast on the pre-show
