= Jakara Jackson =

American professional wrestler (born 1994)

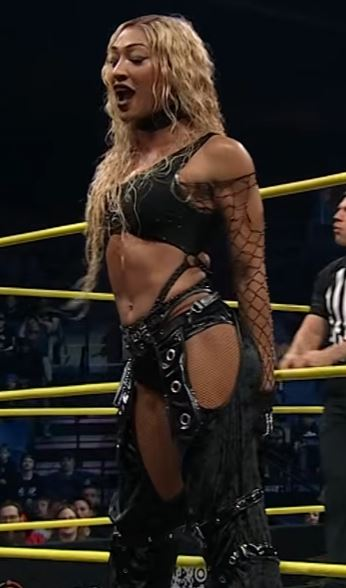
- Garrett in 2026

Personal information
- Born: Jamara Garrett; December 9, 1994 (age 31) Albuquerque, New Mexico, U.S.
- Website: https://www.marasade.com/

Professional wrestling career
- Ring name(s): Jakara Jackson; Mara Sadè
- Billed height: 5 ft 5 in (1.65 m)
- Billed weight: 124 lb (56 kg)
- Billed from: Albuquerque, New Mexico; Duke City, New Mexico
- Trained by: Sara Amato; WWE Performance Center
- Debut: August 5, 2022

Jamara Garrett (born December 9, 1994) is an American professional wrestler. She is signed to All Elite Wrestling (AEW), where she performs under the ring name Mara Sadè (/ʃɑːˈdeɪ/ shah-DAY). She also appears on the independent circuit. She is also known for her time in Total Nonstop Action Wrestling (TNA), and in WWE, where she performed under the ring name Jakara Jackson.

== Professional wrestling career ==
=== WWE (2021–2025) ===
In August 2021, Garrett participated in a WWE tryout in Las Vegas, Nevada, and earned a contract with the company. She was assigned the ring name Jakara Jackson and made her in-ring debut at an NXT house show on August 5, 2022. She made her televised debut on the October 28 episode of NXT Level Up, losing to Thea Hail.

At NXT Battleground on May 28, 2023, Jackson and Lash Legend aligned with Noam Dar and Oro Mensah, forming The Meta-Four. Jackson made her NXT debut later that year, teaming with Legend. In October, she suffered a broken wrist and was withdrawn from the NXT Women's Breakout Tournament.

Jackson returned from injury on the January 16, 2024 episode of NXT, competing in a battle royal to determine the number one contender for the NXT Women's Championship. In July, Jackson and Legend unsuccessfully challenged The Unholy Union for the WWE Women's Tag Team Championship. On the October 11 episode of SmackDown, Jackson and Legend made their main roster debut, unsuccessfully challenging Bianca Belair and Jade Cargill for the WWE Women's Tag Team Championship. They later competed in a fatal four-way tag team match for the titles at Crown Jewel, where Belair and Cargill retained the titles.

On April 29, 2025 episode of NXT, The Meta-Four announced their dissolution in a backstage segment in what would be Jackson's final WWE appearance as a signed talent. Jackson was released by WWE three days later, ending her four-year tenure with the company.

While signed to TNA, Jackson returned to WWE under the ring name Mara Sadè, as a member of Team TNA for the 4-on-4 match against Team NXT at Showdown on October 7, where Team TNA was defeated.

=== Total Nonstop Action Wrestling (2025–2026) ===
At Sacrifice on March 14, 2025, Jakara Jackson and Lash Legend made their Total Nonstop Action Wrestling (TNA) debut where they appeared after the TNA Knockouts World Tag Team Championship match to confront the new champions Ash by Elegance and Heather by Elegance. On the April 3 episode of Impact!, Jackson and Legend made their TNA in-ring debut, defeating Spitfire (Dani Luna and Jody Threat). On April 27 at Rebellion, Jackson and Legend competed in a four-way tag team match for the TNA Knockouts World Tag Team Championship, but failed to win.

On the July 24 episode of Impact!, Jackson returned to TNA as Mara Sadè, teaming with The IInspiration (Cassie Lee and Jessie McKay) to defeat the Elegance Brand (Ash by Elegance, Heather by Elegance, and M by Elegance). It was later announced that Sadè had signed with TNA. At Genesis On January 17, 2026, Sadè lost to Ryan Nemeth in an Intergender match. Following the loss to Nemeth, Sadè began a feud with Elayna Black which ended on March 27 at Sacrifice, where Sadé defeated Black in a No Disqualification match. Sadè's contract with TNA expired in July 2026 and her final match aired on August 6, where she lost to Heather by Elegance in the quarter-final of the TNA Knockouts Television Championship tournament.

=== Independent circuit (2025–present) ===
After being released by WWE, Garrett began performing on the independent circuit, under the ring name Mara Sadè. On June 27, Sadè made her first post-WWE appearance for 4th Rope Wrestling at their event Pray Four Paris, teaming with Tiana James to defeat JGU and Rhio. On July 6, Sadè made her Game Changer Wrestling (GCW) debut on the Jersey Championship Wrestling (JCW) brand at Born (Almost) On The Fourth Of July, where she unsuccessfully challenged Masha Slamovich for the JCW Championship.

=== All Elite Wrestling (2026–present) ===
In September 2026, it was announced on Sadè's personal website that she had signed with All Elite Wrestling (AEW).

== Other media ==
Garrett will star in the upcoming action film Paper Made.

== Personal life ==
Garrett is currently in a relationship with fellow wrestler Kevin Knight.

She also designs her own and other wrestler's ring gear. Notably, Tatum Paxley credited her for designing her entrance jacket for Sunday Night's Main Event.
