= AAW Women's Championship =

Professional wrestling women's championship

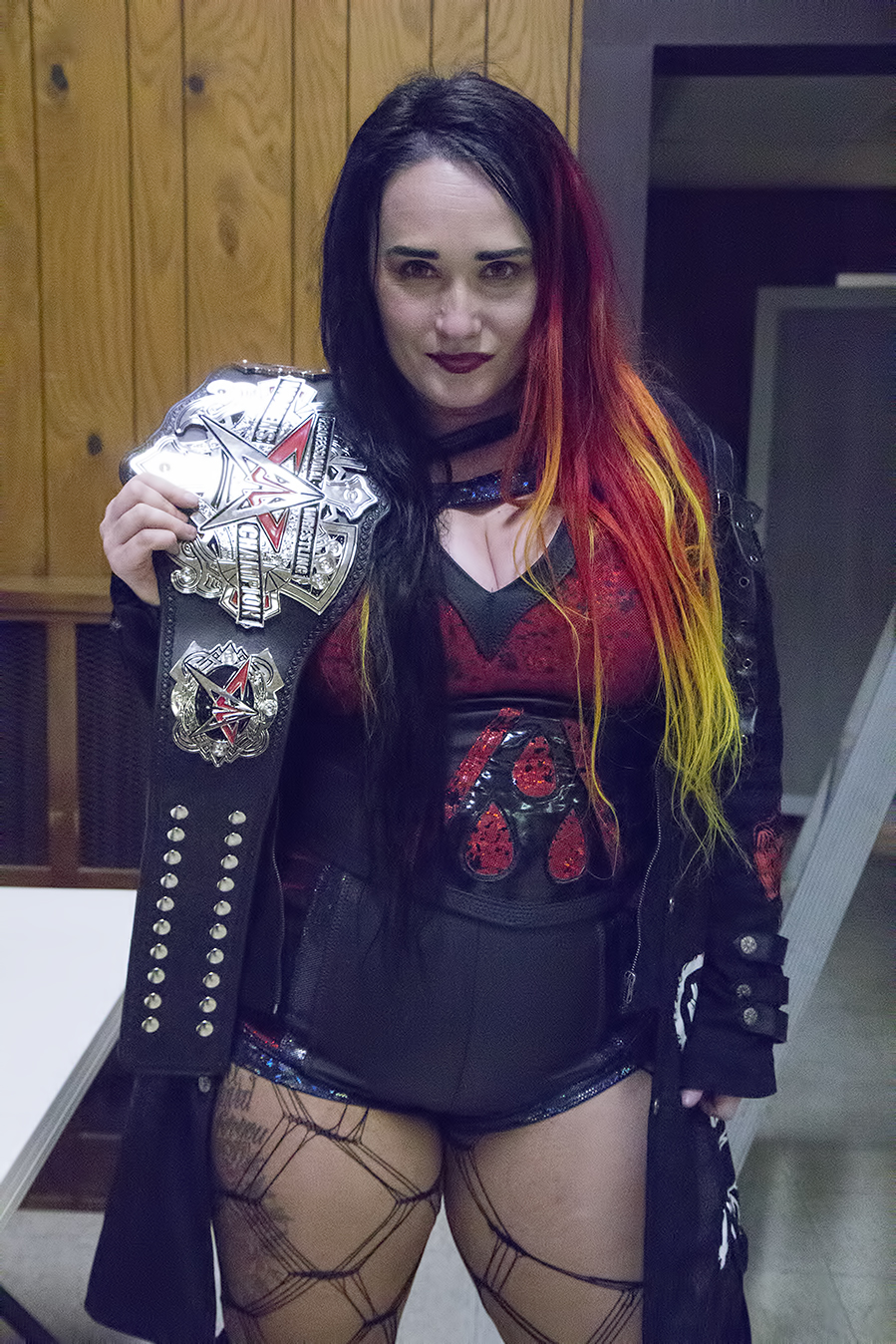
- Inaugural and record two-time champion Jessicka Havok

Details
- Promotion: AAW: Professional Wrestling Redefined
- Date established: December 2, 2017
- Current champion: Maggie Lee
- Date won: July 10, 2026
Statistics
- First champion: Jessicka Havok
- Most reigns: Jessicka Havok and Maggie Lee (2 reigns)
- Longest reign: Kris Statlander (559 days)
- Shortest reign: Kylie Rae (112 days)
- Oldest champion: Allysin kay (33 years, 246 days)
- Youngest champion: Skye Blue (22 years, 55 days)
- Heaviest champion: Jessicka Havok; 170 lb (77 kg)

The AAW Women's Championship is a women's professional wrestling championship created and promoted by the American professional wrestling promotion AAW: Professional Wrestling Redefined. There have been a total of thirteen reigns shared between eleven different champions. The current champion is Maggie Lee, who is in her second reign.

== History ==
From August 5 to December 2, 2017, AAW held a tournament to crown the inaugural champion between twelve wrestlers: Allysin Kay, Britt Baker, Candice LeRae, Delilah Doom, Ivelisse, Jessicka Havok, Kylie Rae, Leah Vaughan, Rachael Ellering, Samantha Heights, Su Yung and Veda Scott. In the tournament finals, Havok defeated Ellering and Ivelisse on December 2, 2017, at AAW Legacy to become the inaugural champion.

== Reigns ==
As of September 24, 2026, there have been thirteen reigns between eleven champions. Jessicka Havok and Maggie Lee are tied for the most reigns at two apiece. Kris Statlander's reign is the longest at 559, while Kylie Rae's reign is the shortest at 112 days. Allysin Kay is the oldest champion at 33 years old, while Skye Blue is the youngest at 22 years old.

Maggie Lee is the current champion in her second reign. She defeated Heather Reckless in a street fight at United We Stand on July 10, 2026, in Merrionette Park, Illinois.

Key
| No. | Overall reign number |
| Reign | Reign number for the specific champion |
| Days | Number of days held |
| + | Current reign is changing daily |

| No. | Champion | Championship change | | | Reign statistics | | Notes | Ref. |
| No. | Champion | Date | Event | Location | Reign | Days | Notes | Ref. |
|---|---|---|---|---|---|---|---|---|
| 1 | Jessicka Havok | December 2, 2017 | Legacy | LaSalle, IL | 1 | 174 | Havok defeated Ivelisse and Rachael Ellering in a three-way match in the finals of a twelve woman tournament also involving Allysin Kay, Britt Baker, Candice LeRae, Delilah Doom, Kylie Rae, Leah Vaughan, Samantha Heights, Su Yung and Veda Scott to become the inaugural champion. | |
| 2 | Kimber Lee | May 25, 2018 | Take No Prisoners | Chicago, IL | 1 | 183 | | |
| 3 | Kylie Rae | November 24, 2018 | Unstoppable | Chicago, IL | 1 | 112 | | |
| 4 | Jessicka Havok | March 16, 2019 | Hell Hath No Fury | Chicago, IL | 2 | 287 | | |
| 5 | Kris Statlander | December 28, 2019 | Windy City Classic XV | Merrionette Park, IL | 1 | 559 | | |
| 6 | Allysin Kay | July 9, 2021 | United We Stand | Merrionette Park, IL | 1 | 140 | | |
| 7 | Skye Blue | November 26, 2021 | Windy City Classic XVI | Merrionette Park, IL | 1 | 154 | | |
| 8 | Christi Jaynes | April 29, 2022 | Never Say Die | Merrionette Park, IL | 1 | 245 | | |
| 9 | Masha Slamovich | December 30, 2022 | Unstoppable | Chicago, IL | 1 | 302 | Won AAW's "Chi-Town Rumble" match to earn a shot at any champion of her choice at any time throughout 2023. Later that night, she cashed in her opportunity and defeated Christi Jaynes to become champion. | |
| 10 | Sierra | October 28, 2023 | Unstoppable | Berwyn, IL | 1 | 461 | | |
| 11 | Maggie Lee | January 31, 2025 | Chi-Town Rumble | Berwyn, IL | 1 | 386 | | |
| 12 | Heather Reckless | February 21, 2026 | Chi-Town Rumble | Berwyn, IL | 1 | 139 | Reckless lost the title to Maggie Lee in a street fight. | |
| 13 | Maggie Lee | July 10, 2026 | United We Stand | Merrionette Park, IL | 2 | 76+ | Lee defeated Heather Reckless in a street fight to win her second reign. | |

== Combined reigns ==
As of September 24, 2026.

| † | Indicates the current champion |

| Rank | Wrestler | No. of reigns | Combined days |
|---|---|---|---|
| 1 | Kris Statlander | 1 | 559 |
| 2 | Maggie Lee † | 2 | 462+ |
| 3 | Jessicka Havok | 2 | 461 |
| 3 | Sierra | 1 | 461 |
| 5 | Masha Slamovich | 1 | 302 |
| 6 | Christi Jaynes | 1 | 245 |
| 7 | Kimber Lee | 1 | 183 |
| 8 | Skye Blue | 1 | 154 |
| 9 | Allysin Kay | 1 | 140 |
| 10 | Heather Reckless | 1 | 139 |
| 11 | Kylie Rae | 1 | 112 |

== See also ==
- AAW Heavyweight Championship
- AAW Tag Team Championship
- AAW Heritage Championship
