= TNA Knockouts Television Championship =

Women's professional wrestling championship

- TNA Knockouts Television Championship belt

Details
- Promotion: Total Nonstop Action Wrestling
- Date established: June 28, 2026
- Current champion: Elayna Black
- Date won: November 19, 2026
Statistics
- First champion: M by Elegance
- Oldest champion: Elayna Black (25 years, 309 days)
- Youngest champion: M by Elegance (24 years, 155 days)

The TNA Knockouts Television Championship is a women's professional wrestling television championship owned by Total Nonstop Action Wrestling (TNA). The championship was announced at Slammiversary on June 28, 2026. As a television title, the title is exclusively defended on Thursday Night Impact!; the "Knockouts" name is a long-standing branding for TNA's women's division. The current champion is Elayna Black, who is in her first reign. She won the title by defeating M by Elegance on the November 19, 2026, taping of Thursday Night Impact!.

== History ==
At Slammiversary on June 28, 2026, TNA Hall of Famer Traci Brooks announced the TNA Knockouts Television Championship, a Knockouts title that will be exclusively defended on Thursday Night Impact!. She announced a tournament featuring 16 Knockouts to crown the inaugural champion; the tournament began on the July 2 episode of Impact!. On June 30, TNA released the bracket for the inaugural tournament, which include wrestlers from WWE's NXT and Evolve brands and indie promotions. Each match had a 10-minute time limit. In the tournament final on the August 27 episode of Impact!, M by Elegance defeated Jada Stone to become the inaugural champion.

=== Inaugural tournament ===
Inaugural tournament

1st Round; Thursday Night Impact! July 1–2, 2026 (Aired: July 2–23, 2026)
TNA	Indi Hartwell	Pinfall
FA	Vicki Venuto	5:15
TNA	Harley Hudson	7:00
NXT	Thea Hail	Pinfall
TNA	Elayna Black	Broadway
Evolve	Wendy Choo	Broadway
TNA	M by Elegance	Pinfall
TNA	Rosemary	8:00
TNA	Jada Stone	Pinfall
TNA	Alisha Edwards	6:00
TNA	Jody Threat	Pinfall
FA	Gabby Forza	6:29
TNA	Mara Sadè	Pinfall
TNA	Tasha Steelz	7:44
TNA	Heather by Elegance	Pinfall
TNA	Allie	5:34

Quarterfinals; Thursday Night Impact! July 30–31, 2026 (Aired: July 30 – August 6)
TNA	Indi Hartwell	Pinfall
NXT	Thea Hail	7:42
—	N/A (Note: Due to their first round match ending in a 10-minute time-limit draw, both Elayna Black and Wendy Choo were eliminated. M by Elegance, their scheduled opponent in the quarterfinals, received a bye from the quarterfinals to automatically advance to the semifinals.)	—
TNA	M by Elegance	Bye
TNA	Jada Stone	Pinfall
TNA	Jody Threat	5:23
TNA	Mara Sadè	8:54
TNA	Heather by Elegance	Pinfall

Semifinals; Thursday Night Impact! July 31, 2026 (Aired: August 13–20)
TNA	Indi Hartwell	7:16
TNA	M by Elegance	Pinfall
TNA	Jada Stone	Pinfall
TNA	Heather by Elegance	7:44

Final; Thursday Night Impact! August 27, 2026
TNA	M by Elegance	Pinfall
TNA	Jada Stone	11:06

== Reigns ==
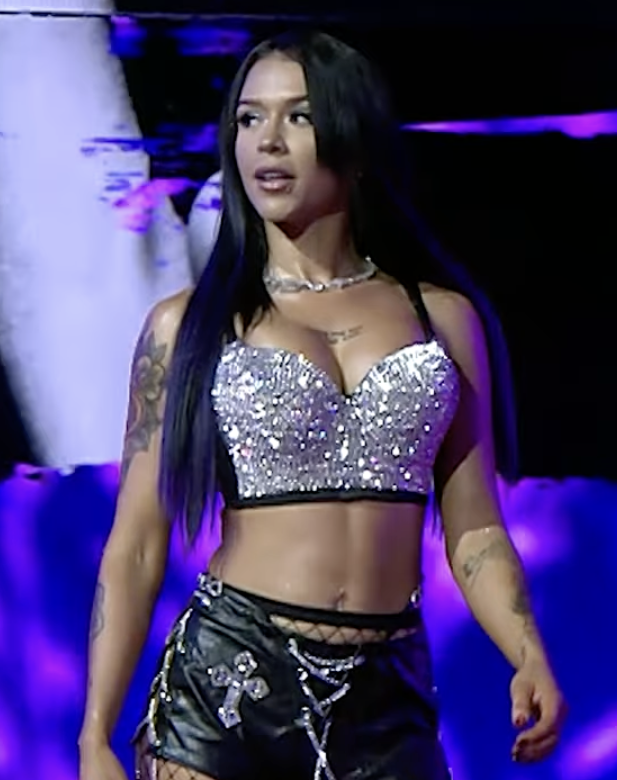
Current champion Elayna Black

As of November 20, 2026, there have been two reigns among two champions. M by Elegance was the inaugural champion and youngest champion, having won the title at 24 years old. Elayna Black is the oldest champion at 25 years old.

Elayna Black is the current champion her first reign. She won the title by defeating M by Elegance on the November 19, 2026, taping of Thursday Night Impact! in Calgary, Alberta, Canada.

Key
No.	Overall reign number
Reign	Reign number for the specific champion
Days	Number of days held
Days recog.	Number of days held recognized by the promotion

No.	Champion	Championship change			Reign statistics			Notes	Ref.
No.	Champion	Date	Event	Location	Reign	Days	Days recog.	Notes	Ref.
Total Nonstop Action Wrestling (TNA)
1	M by Elegance	August 27, 2026	Thursday Night Impact!	Brampton, Ontario, Canada	1	84	84	Defeated Jada Stone in the tournament final to become the inaugural champion.	
2	Elayna Black	November 19, 2026	Thursday Night Impact!	Calgary, Alberta, Canada	1	1+	1+	Will air on a future episode of Impact!.	
