= Jada Stone =

American professional wrestler (born 2003)

Personal information
- Born: Savannah Foxworth; August 4, 2003 (age 23) Columbia, South Carolina, U.S.

Professional wrestling career
- Ring name: Jada Stone
- Billed from: Columbia, South Carolina
- Trained by: Palmetto Wrestling Academy
- Debut: October 31, 2021

Savannah Foxworth (born August 4, 2003), better known by her ring name Jada Stone, is an American professional wrestler. As of 2026, she is signed to Total Nonstop Action Wrestling (TNA).

== Professional wrestling career ==
=== Independent circuit (2021–present) ===
Stone made in in-ring debut in late 2021. In 2022, Stone wrestled her first matches in Impact and All Elite Wrestling.

On June 3, 2023, Stone won her first wrestling championship after winning the UPW Women's Championship. In August 2024, Stone teamed with Maya World naming themselves 'Spark the World' where they won the Reality of Wrestling (ROW) Women's Tag Team Championship, which they held until November 10, when they lost it to The Money Birds.

=== Total Nonstop Action Wrestling (2024–present) ===
Stone made her return to TNA on the May 24, 2024 episode of Xplosion. On the November 13, 2025 episode of TNA Impact!, TNA announced they had signed Stone. She had her first pinfall for the promotion on the February 26, 2026 episode of Impact!.

On June 30, TNA released the bracket for the inaugural tournament for the TNA Knockouts Television Championship, which included Stone. She defeated Alisha Edwards in the first round followed by Jody Threat in the quarterfinals. She then defeated Heather by Elegance to advance to the final of the tournament. She lost to M by Elegance in the final on August 27.

== Championships and accomplishments ==
- Kitsune Women's Wrestling
  - Kitsune North American Championship (1 time, inaugural)
- Pro Wrestling Illustrated
  - Ranked No. 57 of the top 250 women's wrestlers in the PWI Women's 250 in 2025
- Reality of Wrestling
  - ROW Women's Tag Team Championship (1 time) – with Maya World
- United Pro Wrestling
  - UPW Women's Championship (1 time, current)
