= Heather Reckless =

American professional wrestler (born 2000)

Personal information
- Born: Jaime Catherine Chambers; February 26, 2000 (age 26) Denver, Colorado, U.S.

Professional wrestling career
- Ring name(s): Heather by Elegance; Heather Reckless
- Billed height: 4 ft 10 in (147 cm)
- Billed from: Denver, Colorado
- Trained by: Marek Brave; Matt Yaden; Seth Rollins
- Debut: January 26, 2019

Jaime Catherine Chambers (born February 26, 2000), better known by the ring name Heather Reckless, is an American professional wrestler. She is signed to Total Nonstop Action Wrestling (TNA), where she performs under the ring name Heather by Elegance as a member of The Elegance Brand. She is a former TNA Knockouts World Tag Team Champion with stablemate M By Elegance.

== Professional wrestling career ==
=== Early career (2019–2024) ===
Reckless made her debut on January 26, 2019 and has wrestled as enhancement talent for AEW and Ring of Honor from 2021 to 2024, and multiple independent promotions such as Zero1USA since.

Heather made appearances in Juggalo Championship Wrestling in 2024, as Heather Reckless, wrestling Christina Marie on the 5th Episode of JCW Lunacy!

=== Total Nonstop Action Wrestling (2024–present) ===
In September 2024, Reckless signed with Total Nonstop Action Wrestling (TNA), after TNA legend Gail Kim personally offered her a contract. Around this time, Ash by Elegance would later begin a partnership with Heather Reckless, after both wrestlers had helped win each other's matches. Ash would help give Reckless a makeover, where the latter would be renamed Heather by Elegance and started dressing like Ash. At Bound for Glory, Ash and Heather by Elegance would defeat the team of Xia Brookside and Brinley Reece in their tag team debut. In November and December, Ash and Heather would trade victories with Dani Luna and Jody Threat in singles matches. At Genesis, Ash and Heather challenged Luna and Threat for the TNA Knockouts World Tag Team Championship in a losing effort.

On March 14, 2025, at Sacrifice, Ash and Heather by Elegance defeated Luna and Threat to become Knockouts World Tag Team Champions. That year, Maggie Lee joined them in The Elegance Brand as M by Elegance. Heather and M by Elegance lost the tag team titles to The IInspiration (Jessie McKay and Cassie Lee) on the October 2 episode of Impact!, but regained the titles after defeating The IInspiration on Thursday Night Impact!'s AMC debut on January 15, 2026. On June 28 at Slammiversary, Heather and M once again lost the TNA Knockouts World Tag Team Championship, this time to DemonXBunny (Rosemary and Allie). From July 1 to August 27, both Heather participated in a tournament to crown the inaugural TNA Knockouts Television Champion; she defeated Allie in the first round, and Mara Sadè in the quarterfinals before losing to Jada Stone in the semifinal.

=== WWE (2025-2026) ===
Heather made her WWE debut as a TNA contracted wrestler in 2025. On the 6 October 2026 episode of NXT, she appeared as a surprise entrant in the 20-woman Battle Royale to determine the number 1 contender for the NXT Women's Championship at Halloween Havoc.

== Personal life ==
Her favorite wrestlers growing up were Triple H and Jeff Hardy. She is self-taught in gymnastics. She competed in powerlifting competitions while in high school until she quit and moved across the country at 18 to start training as a wrestler under Seth Rollins and Marek Brave at the Black and Brave Wrestling Academy. She makes her own wrestling gear. She currently resides in Tampa, Florida.

== Championships and accomplishments ==
- AAW: Professional Wrestling Redefined
  - AAW Women's Championship (1 time)
- All Heel Wrestling
  - AHW Change Of Fortune Championship (1 time)
  - AHW Women's Championship (1 time)
- Chicago Style Wrestling
  - CSW Women's Championship (1 time)
- Honor Among Wrestling
  - HAW Legacy Championship (1 time)
- Pro Wrestling Illustrated
  - Ranked No. 176 of the top 250 female wrestlers in the PWI Female 250 in 2023
  - Ranked No. 138 of the top 250 female wrestlers in the PWI Female 250 in 2024
- Ragin Pro Wrestling
  - RPW Glamour Championship (1 time)
  - RPW Women's Championship (1 time)
- Total Nonstop Action Wrestling
  - TNA Knockouts World Tag Team Championship (2 times) – with Ash by Elegance and M by Elegance (1) and M by Elegance (1)
  - TNA Year End Awards (1 time)
    - Tag Team Of The Year (2025) – with Ash by Elegance, M by Elegance and The Personal Concierge
