= Elayna Black =

American professional wrestler (born 2001)

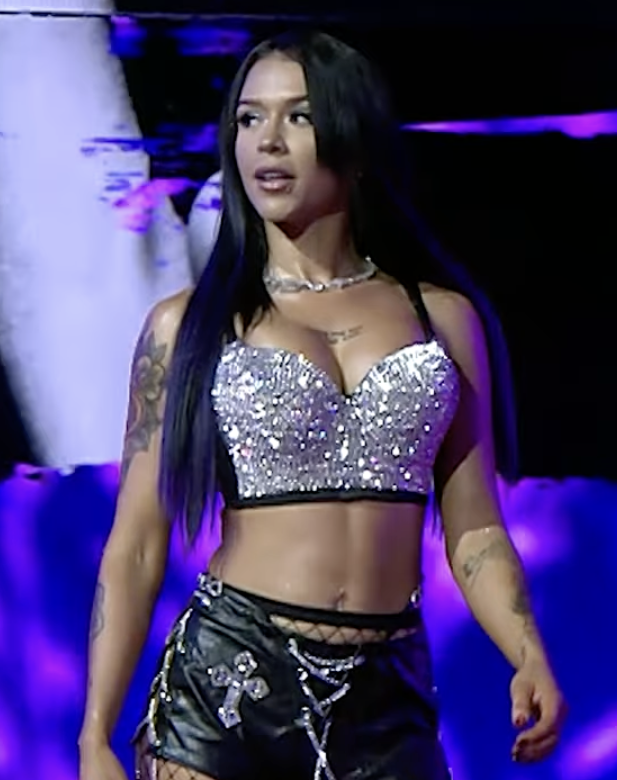
- Black in 2026

Personal information
- Born: Brianna Coda; January 14, 2001 (age 25) Chicago, Illinois, U.S.

Professional wrestling career
- Ring name(s): Cora Jade; Elayna Black
- Billed height: 5 ft 6 in (1.68 m)
- Billed weight: 112 lb (51 kg)
- Billed from: Chicago, Illinois
- Trained by: Freelance Wrestling Academy; WWE Performance Center
- Debut: December 9, 2018

Brianna Coda (born January 14, 2001) is an American professional wrestler. She is signed to Total Nonstop Action Wrestling (TNA), where she performs under the ring name Elayna Black, where she is the current TNA Knockouts Television Champion in her first reign. She is best known for her tenure in WWE, where she performed under the ring name Cora Jade.

== Professional wrestling career ==
=== Early career (2018–2021) ===
Brianna Coda was trained at the Freelance Wrestling Academy. Coda made her professional wrestling debut on December 9, 2018, under the ring name Elayna Black. On July 11, 2019, Black won the Zen Of Women's Athletics Tournament, marking the first tournament accomplishment in her career. On September 1, Black competed in Rise Wrestling's Regional Rising Stars Tournament, where she was eliminated in the quarter final by Sophie King. She also appeared in Shimmer Women Athletes, debuting in Volume 118, competing in a scramble match.

On October 18, 2019, Black made her pay-per-view debut while in Impact Wrestling at Prelude to Glory, where she lost to Havok. Black made her first appearance for All Elite Wrestling (AEW) on the October 13, 2020, episode of Dark, losing to Red Velvet. She also appeared on the November 3 episode of Dark, teaming with Leyla Hirsch against Brandi Rhodes and Red Velvet in a losing effort.

=== WWE (2021–2025) ===
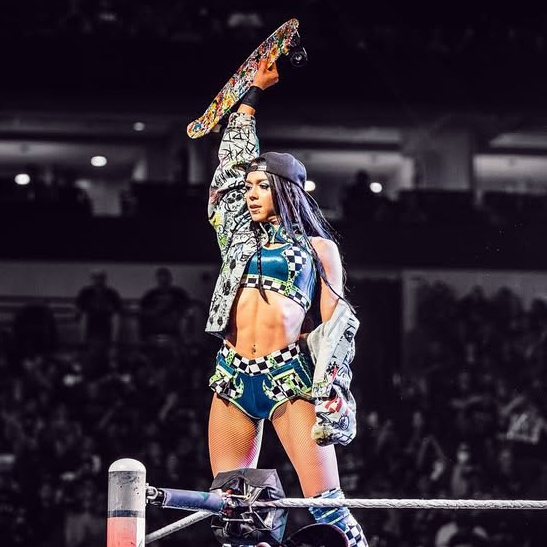
Jade at a house show in 2021.

On January 20, 2021, it was announced that Coda signed a contract with WWE. She debuted on the January 22 episode of 205 Live under the ring name Cora Jade, where she was paired with Gigi Dolin in the opening round of the 2021 Women's Dusty Rhodes Tag Team Classic, but they were eliminated by The Way (Candice LeRae and Indi Hartwell). On the November 16 episode of NXT, Jade joined Raquel González's team for NXT WarGames. At that event, Jade gave her team the victory in the women's WarGames match. Jade got an opportunity at the NXT Women's Championship in a triple threat match against González and champion Mandy Rose at New Year's Evil on January 4, 2022, but failed to win the title. At The Great American Bash, Jade and Roxanne Perez defeated Toxic Attraction (Gigi Dolin and Jacy Jayne) to become the NXT Women's Tag Team Champions.

On the July 12 episode of NXT, Jade turned heel when she attacked Perez, costing her the NXT Women's Championship match against Mandy Rose. The following week, Jade declared her intentions for solo success and then dropped her title belt in the trash can, leaving Perez as the sole tag champion. Later that night, she competed in a 20-woman battle royal to determine the number one contender to the NXT Women's Championship, but was eliminated by eventual winner Zoey Stark. At Heatwave, Jade defeated Perez. On the October 4 episode of NXT, a Weapons Wild match was set between Jade and Perez on Halloween Havoc. The two also agreed on pick your poison matches, where both could choose any opponent in WWE for each other. Jade made her first main roster appearance on the October 17 episode of Raw, where she picked Rhea Ripley as Perez's opponent. The following night, Jade defeated Raquel Rodriguez (Perez's handpicked opponent) by disqualification. Four days later, at Halloween Havoc, Jade lost to Perez in a Weapons Wild match. In May 2023, Jade defeated Fallon Henley in the first round of the tournament for the vacant NXT Women's Championship, but she lost to Lyra Valkyria in the semifinals. Following the August 2 episode of NXT, Jade took a hiatus from WWE television.

After a four-month hiatus, Jade returned at NXT Deadline on December 9, attacking NXT Women's Champion Lyra Valkyria and posed with the title. On January 12, 2024, during a match against Lyra Valkyria at a live event, Jade suffered a torn ACL, and was sidelined for approximately nine months. Jade returned from injury at NXT's CW premier on October 1, helping Roxanne Perez retain the NXT Women's Championship against Giulia. At NXT Halloween Havoc on October 27, Jade and Perez faced Giulia and Stephanie Vaquer in a tag team match in a losing effort. On January 7, 2025 at NXT: New Year's Evil, Jade took on Lola Vice, Kelani Jordan and Stephanie Vaquer in a Fatal four-way match to determine the number one contender for the NXT Women's North American Championship, where she lost.

On February 4, 2025, after Jade heard that she would not be a part of the triple threat match for the NXT Women's Championship at NXT Vengeance Day, Jade attacked Giulia and Bayley, but failed to hit Roxanne Perez, ending their friendship for a second time. After Perez claimed that Jade cannot win a singles title, Jade was slotted into the match at NXT Vengeance Day, making it a fatal four-way match but Jade failed to win the title. On the March 4 episode of NXT, Jade appeared to have suffered a legitimate injury during her match against Jordynne Grace. Jade later reported that the injury was not serious. At the NXT Stand & Deliver pre-show on April 19, Jade teamed with Perez in a Fatal four-way tag team elimination match to become the #1 contenders for the WWE Women's Tag Team Championship, where they lost after Perez abandoned Jade halfway through the match in Jade's final match for WWE. On May 2, Jade was released from her WWE contract, ending her four-year tenure with the company.

=== Total Nonstop Action Wrestling (2025) ===
On January 19, 2025 at Genesis, Coda, as Cora Jade, made her first Total Nonstop Action Wrestling (TNA) appearance since 2019, confronting the TNA Knockouts World Champion Masha Slamovich. On the January 30 episode of TNA Impact!, Jade defeated Hyan. On March 14 at Sacrifice, Jade unsuccessfully challenged Slamovich for the TNA Knockouts World Championship.

=== Independent circuit (2025) ===
After being released by WWE, Coda, now reverting to her Elayna Black ring name, announced appearances for various independent promotions such as Atomic Legacy Wrestling (ALW), Black Label Pro (BLP), Game Changer Wrestling (GCW), and Top Talent Wrestling (TTW). On June 2, 2025, Coda released a vignette on her social media, officially announcing the return of the "Elayna Black" character. On June 20, Black made her return to GCW at Bangin in Little Rock, losing an intergender match to Joey Janela. On June 28, Black would win her first ever singles championship in the form of the AWF Women's Championship by defeating Brittnie Brooks. On July 21, Coda announced that she would be taking a sabbatical from professional wrestling to take care of her mental health and canceled her remaining appearances for the rest of 2025.

=== Return to TNA (2026–present) ===
On January 15, 2026, Coda returned to TNA now under the Elayna Black name on Thursday Night Impact!'s AMC debut, being introduced by Daria Rae as the newest signee to the TNA roster. On January 28, TNA confirmed signing Black. On the January 29 episode of Impact!, Black had her first match since returning to TNA, where she defeated Ruthie Jay. On the July 30 episode of Impact!, Black turned face for the first time since 2022 under her NXT name Cora Jade, she would lose to Xia Brookside at TNA LockDown in a TNA Knockouts World Championship match.

== Other media ==
=== Video games ===
Cora Jade in video games
Year	Title	Notes	Ref.
2023	WWE 2K23	Video game debut	
2024	WWE 2K24		
2025	WWE 2K25		

== Personal life ==
Coda has cited AJ Lee as a primary influence in pursuing her professional wrestling career. She has described herself as a devout fan of fellow Chicago professional wrestler CM Punk. She has also credited Bayley and Sasha Banks as inspirations, particularly after watching their match at NXT Takeover: Brooklyn.

In June 2025, Coda revealed that she had suffered an ectopic pregnancy in January 2023 which required emergency surgery.

== Championships and accomplishments ==
- Arizona Wrestling Federation (AWF)
  - AWF Women's Championship (1 time)
- Pro Wrestling Illustrated
  - Ranked No. 65 of the top 250 female wrestlers in the PWI Women's 250 in 2023
- Total Nonstop Action Wrestling
  - TNA Knockouts Television Championship (1 time, current)
- WWE
  - NXT Women's Tag Team Championship (1 time) – with Roxanne Perez
- ZOWA Live
  - Zen of Womens Athletics Tournament (2019)
