= The IInspiration =

Professional Wrestling Tag Team

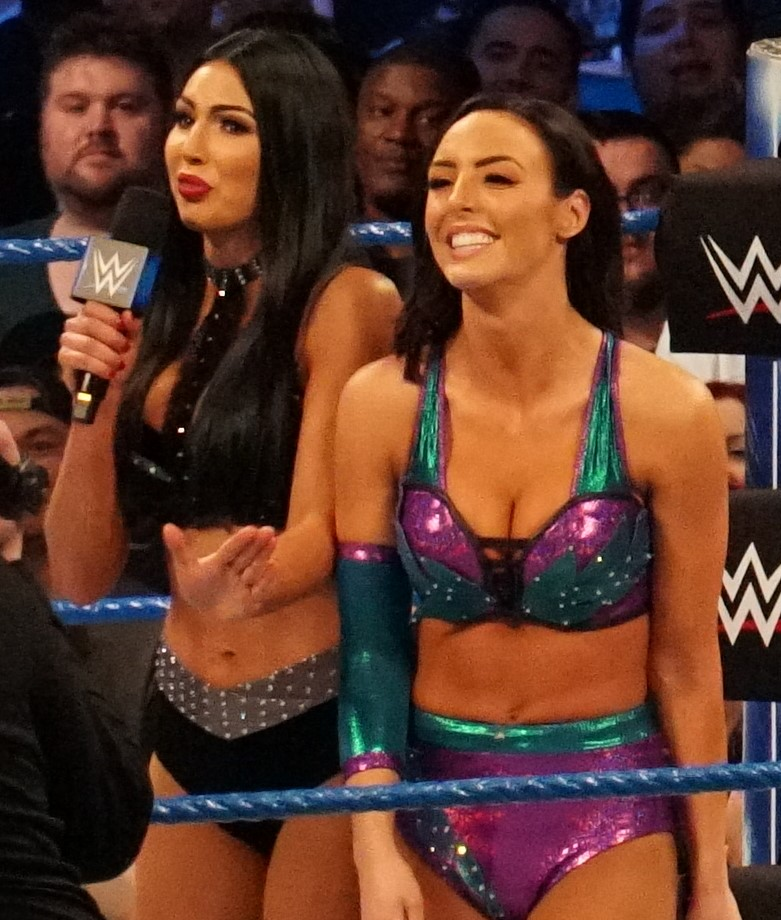
- Billie Kay (L) and Peyton Royce (R) in April 2018

Tag team
- Members: Billie Kay / Jessie McKay / Jessie; Cassie / Cassie Lee / KC Cassidy / Peyton Royce
- Name(s): Billie Kay and Peyton Royce; The Iconic Duo; The IIconics; The IInspiration; Jessie and Cassie; Jessie McKay and KC Cassidy
- Billed heights: Billie Kay: 5 ft 8 in (1.73 m); Peyton Royce: 5 ft 7 in (1.70 m)
- Combined billed weight: 264 lb (120 kg)
- Billed from: Sydney, Australia
- Debut: 8 May 2015
- Years active: 2015–2020; 2021–2022; 2025–present
- Trained by: Madison Eagles

The IInspiration are an Australian professional wrestling tag team consisting of Jessie McKay and Cassie Lee. They are signed to All Elite Wrestling (AEW). They were originally known for their run in WWE as The Iconic Duo and later The IIconics, before moving on to other companies, most notably Total Nonstop Action Wrestling (TNA).

McKay and Lee, who were real-life friends prior to being a team, both attended Westfields Sports High School and were trained by Madison Eagles. Prior to WWE, Kay and Royce wrestled in Pro Wrestling Women's Alliance (PWWA) in Australia under the names Jessie McKay and KC Cassidy. They debuted as a team on 8 May 2015, shortly after being both signed on WWE's division NXT, and were used as jobbers on house shows, not picking up a single victory during their first year and a half as a team; during that time, they were renamed Jessie and Cassie, before they took on the names of Billie Kay and Peyton Royce, which they would keep for the rest of their time in WWE. The two debuted on NXT television on 5 October 2016, later dubbing themselves The Iconic Duo, and later the IIconics, unsuccessfully chasing after the NXT Women's Championship. They made their move to the main roster by joining SmackDown on 10 April 2018, now as The IIconics, and captured the WWE Women's Tag Team Championship at WrestleMania 35 the following year, becoming the first all-Australian tag team champions in WWE history, and the first Australians to win a title at WrestleMania, WWE's flagship event. The two would break-up as the result of losing a feud with The Riott Squad in August 2020, and eventually be released simultaneously by the company in April 2021.

The two resumed teaming up following their releases, now going by the name The IInspiration. They eventually signed with TNA (then Impact Wrestling) in October 2021, and would win the Knockouts Tag Team Championship in their debut match at Bound for Glory, with the title renamed Knockouts World Tag Team Championship during their reign; after losing the titles, the two would step away from in-ring action in April 2022, ending their tenure with Impact Wrestling, although they would continue their podcast together until 2024. They would return to wrestling in 2025, returning to TNA where they would win the Knockouts Tag Team Championship for the second time while expanding to other promotions such as All Elite Wrestling, Ring of Honor and Tokyo Joshi Pro-Wrestling, where they won the Princess Tag Team Championship.

They are the only tag team to have won both the WWE Women's Tag Team Championship and the TNA Knockouts Tag Team Championship.

== History ==
=== Origins ===
Before forming as a team, Kay (under her real name Jessie McKay) and Royce (as KC Cassidy) wrestled each other at Pro Wrestling Women's Alliance (PWWA) throughout their careers including a title match for the PWWA Championship. Both women joined WWE, where they were assigned to NXT, in 2015, originally under their ring names from PWWA. Cassidy made her debut on the 15 May episode of NXT, losing to NXT Women's Champion Sasha Banks in a non-title match.

=== WWE (2015–2021, 2025) ===
==== Early years (2015–2018) ====
McKay and Cassidy were teamed up shortly after joining NXT, although they would only appear in house shows for over a year. Their first match as a team was on 8 May 2015 at a house show in Largo, Florida, where they lost to Bayley and Carmella in what was also McKay's first match in WWE. For a period of over a year, the two were used as jobbers and lost all of their matches as a team, although they won a few separately; during that period, they were renamed Cassie (Royce) and Jessie (Kay), before taking on their names of Peyton Royce and Billie Kay in August 2015.

The team made their TV debut on the 5 October 2016 episode of NXT, and were later dubbed "The Iconic Duo". Almost a year and a half after the creation of their team, the duo picked up their first win on 14 October 2016 at a house show in Fort Pierce, Florida, defeating Aliyah and Liv Morgan. They also won their first match on television on the 28 December 2016 episode of NXT, defeating Aliyah and Morgan again. On 28 January 2017 at NXT TakeOver: San Antonio, the two were voted 2016's "Breakout of the Year" at the NXT Year-End Awards; they also competed at the event in their live TV debut, both losing in a fatal four-way match for the NXT Women's Championship won by defending champion Asuka.

At NXT TakeOver: WarGames, Royce unsuccessfully competed in a fatal four-way match for the vacant NXT Women's Championship against Kairi Sane, Nikki Cross, and winner Ember Moon. The duo's final televised match on NXT TV was on the 4 October 2017 episode of NXT in a loss against Cross and Ruby Riott, although they kept on competing in house shows and Peyton made her main roster debut for SmackDown in the 20-woman WrestleMania Women's Battle Royal at WrestleMania 34; their final match as a part of the NXT brand was on 12 April 2018 at a house show in Fort Pierce, Florida, where they lost against Dakota Kai and Steffanie Newell; after the match, both teams embraced one another.

==== Women's Tag Team Champions (2018–2019) ====
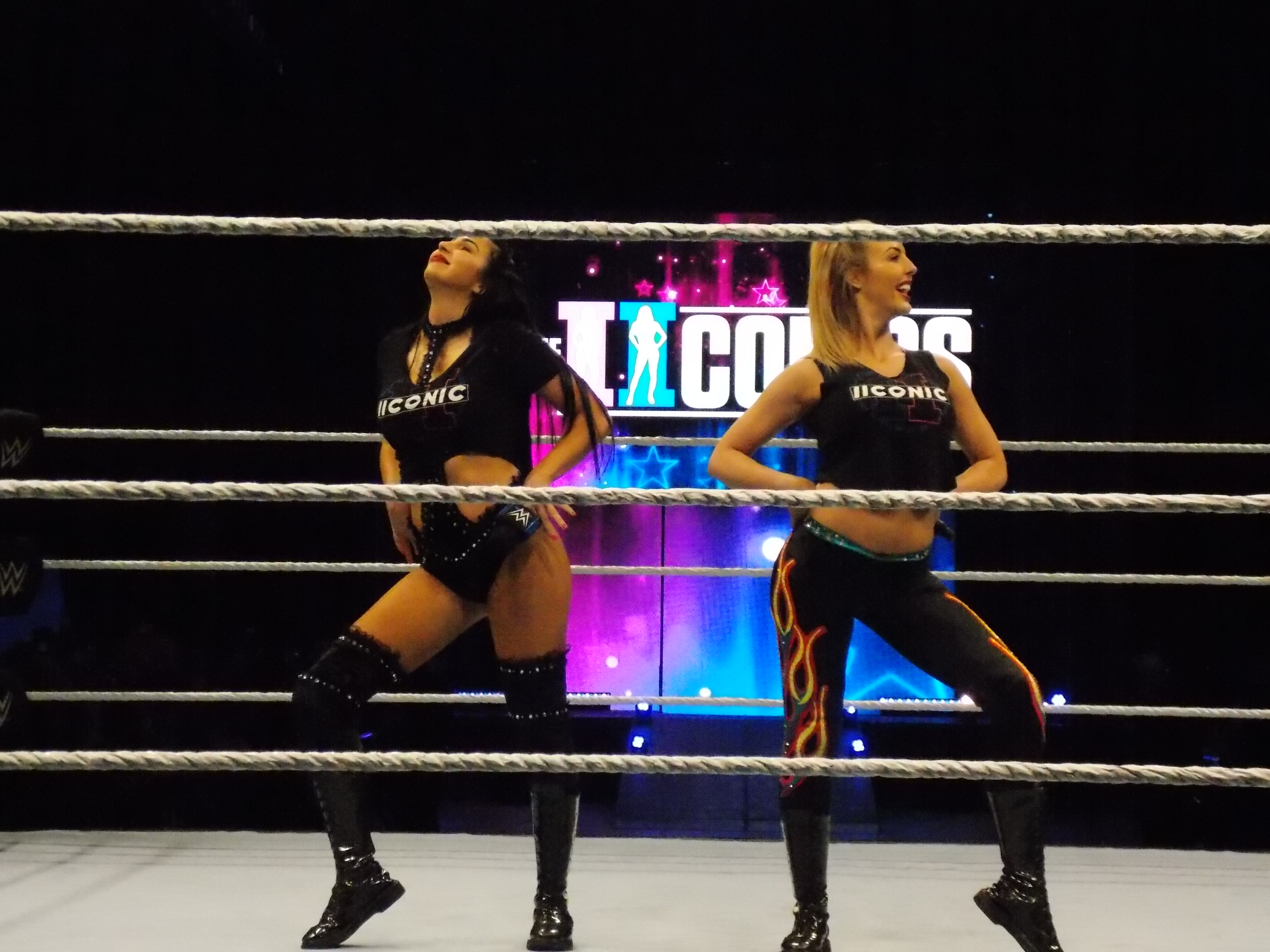
Kay (left) and Royce (right) at a WWE house show in August 2019

Kay and Royce, now known as "The IIconics", debuted on 10 April 2018 episode of SmackDown Live, attacking SmackDown Women's Champion Charlotte Flair, allowing Carmella to cash in her Money in the Bank contract and defeat Flair to win the championship. The following week on SmackDown, The IIconics won their first match on the main roster by defeating Asuka and Becky Lynch. On 6 October at Super Show-Down in their native country, they defeated Asuka and Naomi.

In 2019, The IIconics entered their first Royal Rumble match at the Royal Rumble (2019) , eliminating Nikki Cross before being eliminated by Lacey Evans. The following month at Elimination Chamber, they participated in the first female tag team Elimination Chamber match to determine the inaugural holders of the WWE Women's Tag Team Championship, eliminating Naomi and Carmella before being eliminated by Nia Jax and Tamina; the match was ultimately won by The Boss 'n' Hug Connection (Bayley and Sasha Banks).

In March, The IIconics started a feud with The Boss 'n' Hug Connection, whom they defeated in a non–title match on the 19 March episode of SmackDown. Because of their win, they (and two other teams) challenged Banks and Bayley for the championship at WrestleMania 35 in a fatal four-way tag team match. At the event on 7 April, The IIconics won the Women's Tag Team Championship after Kay pinned Bayley. Their win made them the first all-Australian tag team champions in WWE history (the only previous occurrence of an Australian tag team champion was Buddy Murphy, who became NXT Tag Team Champion alongside American Wesley Blake in 2015), and the first Australians to win a title at WrestleMania. Two days later on SmackDown, in their first title defence, The IIconics defeated Kris Statlander and Karissa Rivera. On 17 June episode of Raw, the IIconics successfully defended their titles against Alexa Bliss and Nikki Cross. On the 16 July episode of SmackDown, The IIconics retained their titles against The Kabuki Warriors (Asuka and Kairi Sane) via count-out. On the 5 August episode of Raw, the duo lost the titles to Bliss and Cross in a fatal four-way elimination match. They were the first team eliminated in the match, being knocked out by Mandy Rose and Sonya Deville. Their reign ended at 120 days.

==== Disbandment (2019–2021) ====
On 16 October, it was announced that The IIconics had been drafted to Raw as supplemental picks of the 2019 WWE Draft. The team unsuccessfully challenged for the WWE Women's Tag Team Championships multiple times throughout the summer. They also feuded with Ruby Riott, mocking her backstage for not having any friends. They would go on to trade victories as Kay and Royce defeated Riott while Riott defeated Kay. At Payback, The IIconics were defeated by Riott and her newly reunited tag partner Liv Morgan. The following night on Raw, The IIconics were forced to disband after losing to The Riott Squad per a stipulation. As a result of the 2020 WWE Draft, Royce was drafted to Raw while Kay was drafted to SmackDown, solidifying the breakup. As a result of budget cuts made by WWE just days following WrestleMania 37 on 15 April 2021, Kay and Royce were released from their WWE contracts ending their six-years runs with the company. Both women were placed under a 90-day no compete clause which expired on 14 July 2021.

==== Return to NXT (2025) ====
On the 30 September episode of NXT, The IIconics, under the name The IInspiration, made their return to WWE telelvision for the first time in four years, which was also their first appearance on NXT since 2018. They were chosen to be on Team TNA for a 4-on-4 Survivor Series style match at NXT vs. TNA Showdown.

=== Impact / Total Nonstop Action Wrestling (2021–2022; 2025–2026) ===
Following their releases, the two confirmed their intention to resume teaming-up outside of WWE, calling themselves a package deal. They had also stated in numerous interviews that they were considering their options, and were undecided on if they would sign with Impact Wrestling or All Elite Wrestling. In June, the two filed a trademark for The IInspiration name, which indicated their new team name. On 27 August, the two announced The IInspiration Tour, marking their return to wrestling.

At Knockouts Knockdown on 9 October 2021, it was announced that The IInspiration would be making their debut for Impact Wrestling at Bound for Glory, where they defeated Decay (Havok and Rosemary) for the Impact Knockouts Tag Team Championship, becoming the first female team to have won women's tag titles in both Impact Wrestling and WWE in history. They retained the titles against Decay at Turning Point. At Sacrifice, The IInspiration lost the titles to The Influence (Madison Rayne and Tenille Dashwood), and failed to regain the titles at Rebellion. On 27 April 2022, The IInspiration announced that they will be indefinitely stepping away from in-ring action, ending their tenure with Impact Wrestling.

On 6 June 2025 at Against All Odds, The IInspiration made their return to Impact Wrestling, now known as Total Nonstop Action Wrestling (TNA), confronting TNA Knockouts World Tag Team Champions The Elegance Brand (Ash by Elegance and Heather by Elegance). They won the titles for the second time during the TV tapings on 27 September 2025 but lost the titles back to The Elegance Brand (Heather by Elegance and M by Elegance) on Thursday Night Impact!'s AMC debut on 15 January 2026.

=== All Elite Wrestling (2026–present) ===
McKay and Lee made their All Elite Wrestling (AEW) debut and announced that they had signed with the promotion at a house show in Brisbane, Australia, on 15 February 2026. They made their in-ring debut on the 4 March episode of Dynamite, losing to The Brawling Birds (Alex Windsor and Jamie Hayter) in a squash match.

=== Ring of Honor (2026–present) ===
On the March 22, 2026 episode of Ring of Honor Wrestling The Iinspiration made their Ring of Honor debut and then faced Viva Van and Frankie B.

=== Tokyo Joshi Pro-Wrestling (2026–present) ===
On 17 March 2026, The IInspiration made their Tokyo Joshi Pro-Wrestling (TJPW) debut during the first day of an event in the United States, where they defeated Shoko Nakajima and Wakana Uehara. On 23 March, during the Grand Princess event, they defeated Ober Eats (Yuki Kamifuku and Wakana Uehara) to win the Princess Tag Team Championship. On 16 April, they had their first successful title defense against Kyoraku Kyomei (Hyper Misao and Shoko Nakajima). On May 4, The IInspiration lost their titles to Hakuchuumu (Miu Watanabe and Rika Tatsumi), ending their reign at 36 days.

== Other media ==
Off Her Chops

YouTube information
- Channel: Off Her Chops
- Years active: 2021-2024
- Genre: Podcasting
- Subscribers: 11.7 thousand
- Views: 596 thousand
- Last updated: June 28, 2025

McKay and Arneill, as Billie Kay and Peyton Royce respectively, made their video game debut in WWE 2K18. They both appeared in its sequels, WWE 2K19, WWE 2K20 and WWE 2K22.

On 16 May 2021, McIntosh and McKay launched a comedy and variety podcast titled Off Her Chops.

== Championship and accomplishments ==
- Impact Wrestling / Total Nonstop Action Wrestling
  - Impact / TNA Knockouts World Tag Team Championship (2 times)
- Pro Wrestling Illustrated
  - Ranked No. 50 of the top 50 tag teams in the PWI Tag Team 50 in 2020
- Tokyo Joshi Pro-Wrestling
  - Princess Tag Team Championship (1 time)
- WWE
  - WWE Women's Tag Team Championship (1 time)
  - NXT Year-End Award (1 time)
    - Breakout of the Year (2016)
