= TNA Impact! premiere on AMC =

Professional wrestling television special

- Promotional poster featuring The Hardys, Leon Slater, Léi Yǐng Lee, Mike Santana, and Frankie Kazarian
- Promotion: Total Nonstop Action Wrestling
- Date: January 15, 2026
- City: Garland, Texas
- Venue: Curtis Culwell Center
- Attendance: 2,830

Impact! special episodes chronology
← Previous; Countdown to Unbreakable	Next → Countdown to Bound for Glory

The Thursday Night Impact! premiere on AMC was a professional wrestling television special produced by Total Nonstop Action Wrestling (TNA). It marked the debut of TNA's weekly Thursday Night Impact! program on AMC. The event took place on January 15, 2026, from the Curtis Culwell Center in Garland, Texas, and featured wrestlers from TNA and partner promotion WWE.

Three matches took place at the event. In the main event, Mike Santana defeated Frankie Kazarian to win the TNA World Championship. In the penultimate match, The Elegance Brand (Heather by Elegance and M by Elegance) defeated The IInspiration (Cassie Lee and Jessie McKay) to win the TNA Knockouts World Tag Team Championship, and in the opening contest, Elijah and The Hardys (Matt Hardy and Jeff Hardy) defeated Order 4 (Mustafa Ali, Jason Hotch and John Skyler). The event also featured the TNA debut of Candice Michelle, special appearances by Dixie Carter, AJ Styles and Bully Ray, the debut of Daria Rae, and the return of Elayna Black.

== Production ==
=== Background ===
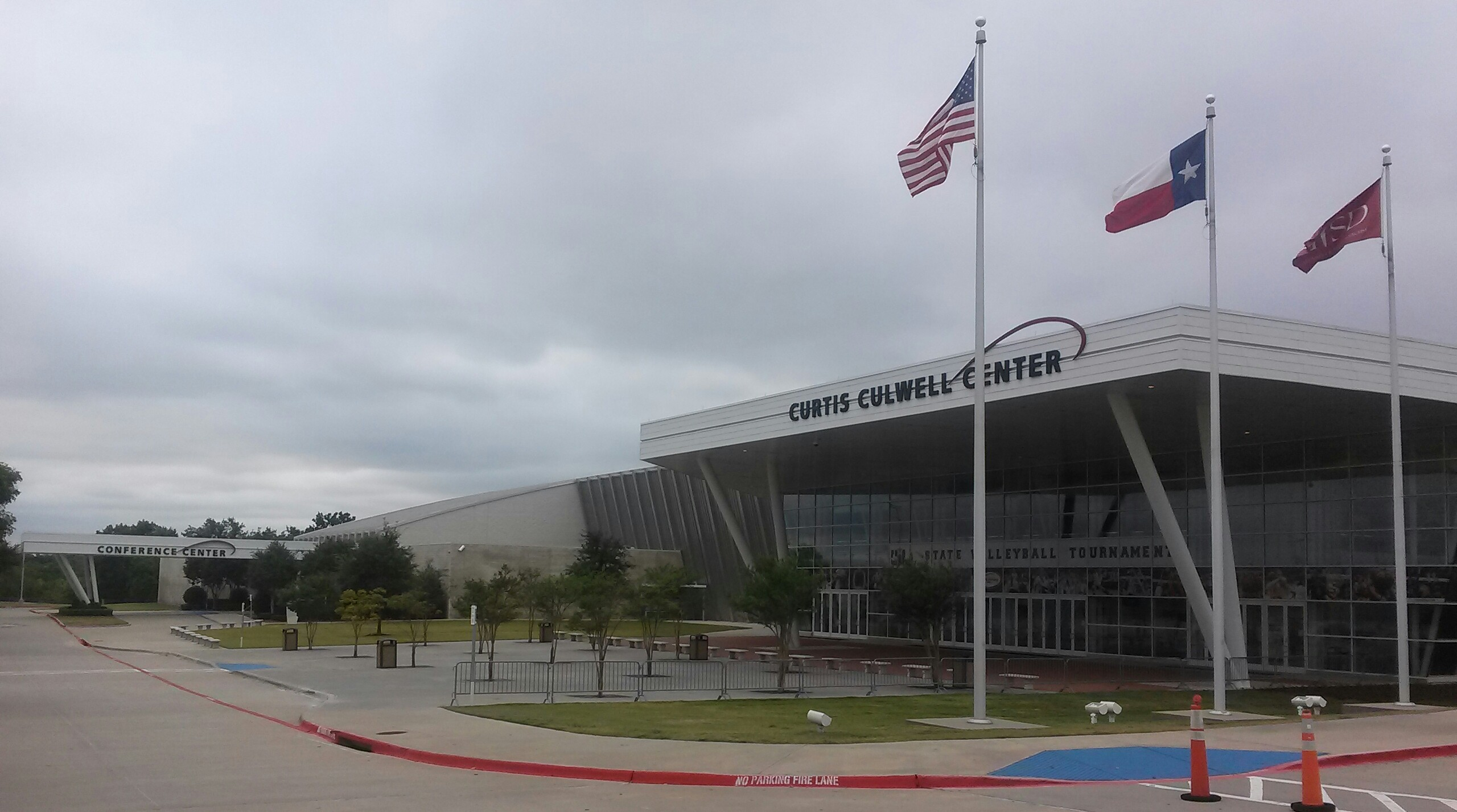
The event took place at the Curtis Culwell Center in Garland, Texas.

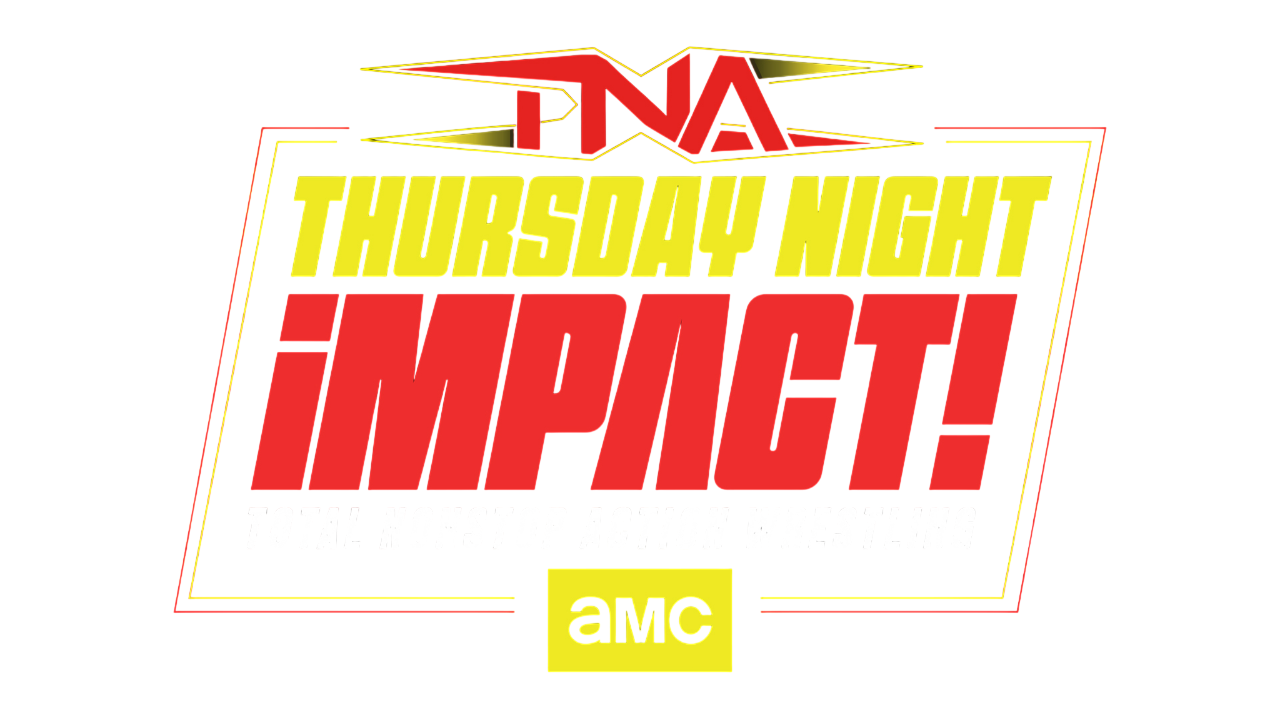
The TNA Thursday Night Impact! logo that was unveiled on December 2, 2025.

TNA Impact! is a professional wrestling television program produced by American promotion Total Nonstop Action Wrestling (TNA). It first aired on June 4, 2004, on Fox Sports Net. It previously aired on AXS TV and TNA+ in the United States, owned by its parent company Anthem Sports & Entertainment.

On December 2, 2025, AMC Networks and TNA announced a multi-year media rights agreement in which TNA Impact! will exclusively air on AMC and AMC+ for two hours every Thursday from 9–11 p.m. ET starting on January 15, 2026. The debut episode took place at the Curtis Culwell Center in Garland, Texas. Fightful Select reported that Thursday Night Impact! on AMC would utilize a production format consisting of live and taped episodes.

On January 9, TNA announced the special appearance by AJ Styles, who last appeared at Slammiversary on July 20, 2025. On January 13, TNA announced that Bully Ray would serve as the special guest commentator during the main event of the AMC debut episode. During the show, Ray also worked as producer.

=== Storylines ===
The event included matches that resulted from scripted storylines. Results were predetermined by TNA's writers.

At Bound For Glory on October 12, 2025, Frankie Kazarian and Nic Nemeth won the 22-persion Intergender Call Your Shot Gauntlet for the rights to a trophy and contract that they can invoke anytime for one year for a championship match of their choosing. On the November 13, 2025, episode of Impact!, various NXT wrestlers attacked TNA World Champion Mike Santana and Ryan Nemeth. Kazarian appeared to invoke his Call Your Shot Gauntlet title opportunity against Santana for the TNA World Championship, which he went on to win. On the December 11, 2025, episode of Impact!, Santana revealed that he will get his contractually obligated rematch against Frankie Kazarian for the TNA World Championship at Genesis on January 17, 2026, at the Curtis Culwell Center in Garland, Texas. On January 1, 2026, Santana revealed that TNA Director of Authority Santino Marella moved their match two days early at Thursday Night Impact!'s debut episode on AMC.

==== Canceled match ====
TNA X Division Champion Leon Slater was originally slated to defend his title against Myron Reed at the event. Despite Reed signing with All Elite Wrestling (AEW) along with his fellow The Rascalz stablemates, he was willing to fulfill his remaining obligation with TNA. The match was still shelved due to Slater not having a valid visa, leaving him unable to travel and work outside England.

== Reception ==
The show had 173.000 viewers, with a 0.04 share in the 18-49 demo. The show had a negative reception and, according to Fightful, the backstage talent had a pessimistic reception of the event. Thomas Hall and Himanshu Doi, both 411Mania's writers, reviewed the episode: Hall gave it a 3, calling it a "disaster", while Doi gave it a 6.7, but mentioning "For someone that would have been tuning in for the first time in a while, I don't think they did quite enough to hook those viewers in."

== Results ==
No.	Results	Stipulations	Times
1	Elijah and The Hardys (Jeff Hardy and Matt Hardy) defeated Order 4 (Mustafa Ali, Jason Hotch, and John Skyler) by pinfall	Six-man tag team match	8:20
2	The Elegance Brand (Heather by Elegance and M by Elegance) (with Ash by Elegance, The Personal Concierge, Mr. Elegance, and Perez Hilton) defeated The IInspiration (Cassie Lee and Jessie McKay) (c) by pinfall	Tag team match for the TNA Knockouts World Tag Team Championship	9:30
3	Mike Santana defeated Frankie Kazarian (c) by pinfall	Singles match for the TNA Heavyweight Championship	17:00
(c) / – the champion(s) heading into the match

== See also ==
- WWE Raw premiere on Netflix
