= Destination X (2026) =

TNA professional wrestling event

- Promotional poster featuring Leon Slater and Trey Miguel
- Promotion: Total Nonstop Action Wrestling
- Date: November 15, 2026
- City: Edmonton, Alberta, Canada
- Venue: Edmonton Expo Centre
- Attendance: 2,098

Pay-per-view chronology
← Previous; Bound for Glory	Next → —

Destination X chronology
← Previous; 2017	Next → —

The 2026 Destination X was a professional wrestling pay-per-view (PPV) event produced by Total Nonstop Action Wrestling (TNA). It took place on Sunday, November 15, 2026, at the Edmonton Expo Centre in Edmonton, Alberta, Canada. It was the 14th event under the Destination X chronology and the first since 2017. The event primarily revolves around the X Division. Due to travel issues caused by a ground stop issued by the Federal Aviation Administration (FAA) in the United States on Friday, November 13, changes to the original match card were made because multiple wrestlers were unable to fly to Edmonton.

Seven matches were contested at the event, including one on the pre-show. In the main event, Leon Slater defeated Trey Miguel to retain the TNA World Championship. In other prominent matches, Belgium's Ricky Sosa won the 2026 World X-Cup, Tasha Steelz won the Knockouts Ultimate X match to become the number one contender to the TNA Knockouts World Championship, and KC Navarro won the Men's Ultimate X match to become the number one contender to the TNA X Division Championship. The event also featured the TNA return of TJP, who last appeared in the promotion in 2023.

== Production ==
=== Background ===
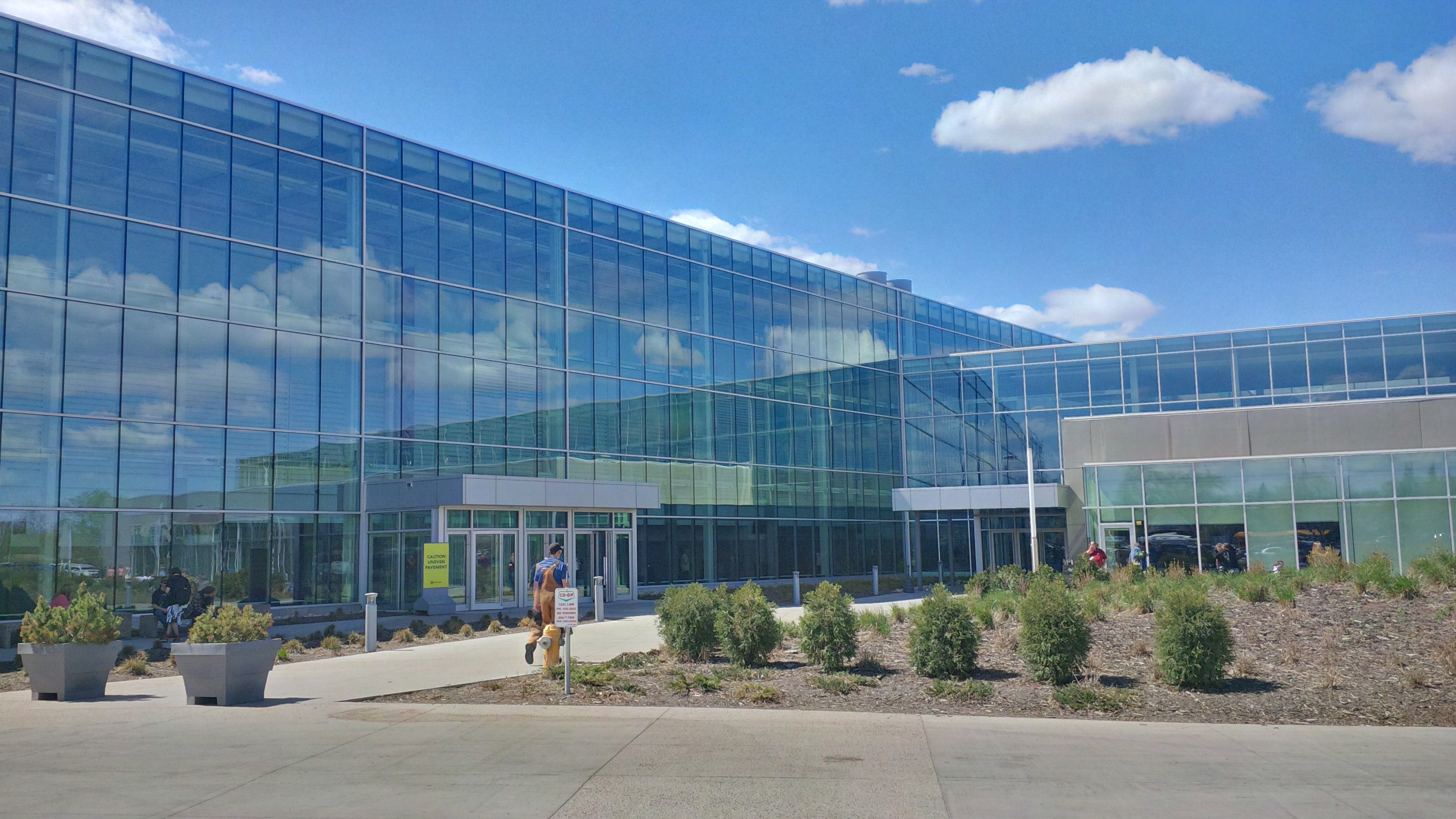
Destination X took place at the Edmonton Expo Centre in Edmonton, Alberta, Canada.

Destination X was held by TNA as an X Division-exclusive event since the 2011 edition. Beginning with the 2012 edition, Destination X also became a staple for the X Division Champions to invoke Option C, which required them to vacate the title to earn a shot for the World Heavyweight Championship at the event. It was announced on TNA Wrestling's official website in January 2011 that Destination X was moving from March to July, switching places with TNA's traditional July PPV, Victory Road. On the June 21, 2012, edition of Impact, it was announced that every year the current X Division Champion would have an opportunity to give up their title for a shot at the TNA World Heavyweight Championship at Destination X. On January 11, 2013, TNA announced that in 2013 there would be only four PPVs, not including Destination X, although Destination X would be featured as a special episode of Impact Wrestling from 2013 to 2017.

At Slammiversary on June 28, 2026, TNA announced the return of Destination X on November 15 at Edmonton Expo Centre in Edmonton, Alberta, Canada. This will be the first event since 2017.

==== Travel issues ====
On November 13, 2026, at 20:54 UTC (3:54 p.m. EST), the Federal Aviation Administration (FAA) issued a nationwide ground stop across the United States shortly after air traffic controllers detected inconsistencies in radar data and aircraft communications. The outage also affected international flights that transited United States airspace. At a White House briefing, Secretary of Homeland Security Markwayne Mullin said that new FAA equipment and technology appeared to have overwhelmed older systems. Secretary of Transportation Sean Duffy said switches and routers had become overloaded with data, producing inconsistent information. The ground stop was lifted at 01:15 UTC (8:15 p.m. EST), more than four hours after the ground stop was issued. Although the ground stop had been lifted, more than 2,500 flights were canceled and hundreds more were delayed a day later on November 14, as airlines worked to restore normal operations. The Associated Press reported that the effects of the shutdown could continue for several days. TNA issued a statement that confirms that Destination X will continue as scheduled but with changes to the match card due to travel issues.

=== Storylines ===
The event featured professional wrestling matches that involve different wrestlers from pre-existing scripted feuds and storylines. Wrestlers portrayed villains, heroes, or less distinguishable characters in scripted events that built tension and culminated in a wrestling match or series of matches.

On The Hardys' (Jeff Hardy and Matt Hardy) 35-year legacy celebration on the October 15, 2026, episode of Thursday Night Impact!, The Hardys scheduled a five-way ladder match to determine TNA World Champion Leon Slater's title challenger at Destination X. The ladder match featured Elijah, Moose, Ricky Sosa, Trey Miguel, and TNA International Champion Jason Hotch. The match was won by Miguel, and Slater versus Miguel for the TNA World Championship was made official for Destination X.

On the October 29 episode of Impact!, Mustafa Ali warned Frankie Kazarian about Avery Styles eventually betraying him. He claimed that the next generation of wrestlers use veterans to reach the top of the promotion, but Kazarian dismissed his warning. After Kazarian and Styles won a match the following week, Ali warned Kazarian not to raise Styles' hand, but Kazarian threw Ali out of the ring and raised Styles' hand. Kazarian and Ali then fought each other on the November 12 episode, where Ali defeated Kazarian after he took advantage of Kazarian being distracted as he tried to prevent a furious Styles from striking back against Ali. On the day of Destination X, Kazarian and Ali had a confrontation backstage, where Kazarian challenged Ali to a match later that night with Ali proposing that Kazarian put his Call Your Shot Gauntlet trophy on the line. Kazarian accepted Ali's stakes, and the match was made official.

==== Matches affected by travel issues ====
Since the Countdown to Lockdown pre-show on August 23, TNA Director of Operations Daria Rae opposed Indi Hartwell becoming the TNA Knockouts World Champion. Rae would bring in Zoey Serrano as her proxy to physically stop Hartwell from achieving her goal; Serrano would later bring in Shayna Baszler as her tag team partner. On the September 24 episode of Impact!, Hartwell provoked Rae into slapping her while TNA Director of Authority Santino Marella filmed the altercation; the board of directors then suspended Rae. At Bound for Glory on October 11, Hartwell defeated Xia Brookside to become the new TNA Knockouts World Champion. Rae returned from suspension on the October 22 episode of Impact!, claiming that Hartwell would not have won the title had she not been suspended, which prompted Hartwell to interrupt Rae. Hartwell tried to provoke Rae to slap her again, but Rae announced that Brookside invoked her title rematch clause immediately. Despite the impromptu title defense, Hartwell managed to retain her title. Following the match, Rae distracted Hartwell to allow Serrano and Baszler to ambush Hartwell. The following week, Baszler announced that she would be challenging Hartwell for the TNA Knockouts World Championship at Destination X, which was scheduled by Rae. A few hours before the Countdown to Destination X show, Hartwell announced that she could not make it to Edmonton, Alberta, Canada, for Destination X, thus, her title defense against Baszler was cancelled.

For several months, various wrestlers were attacked backstage, including Moose, Ryan Nemeth, and The Hardys (Jeff Hardy and Matt Hardy). On the September 24 episode of Impact!, The Hardys called out the unknown assailants, who appeared and attacked them. The assailants then revealed themselves as Syx (Samuel Shaw and Joseph Sawyer). The following week, Syx expressed their intent to cut apart the "rotten" TNA. At Bound for Glory, Syx defeated The Hardys in a Falls Count Anywhere match. On the October 22 episode of Impact!, Syx said that they would be satisfied when The Hardys are dead. The following week, The Hardys and Syx competed in a Slaughterhouse Syx match, which ended with Syx covering Jeff with a trash can before hitting Jeff with fire axes. On the November 6 episode, Moose called out Syx as his next target because he was the first person Syx attacked. He then asked Syx to come out, which led to Syx attacking Moose until Matt stopped them while wielding a pipe. Later that night, Matt said that Syx tried to "kill" Jeff (in kayfabe or in the storyline). Matt then announced that TNA Director of Authority Santino Marella had sanctioned Moose and Matt versus Syx at Destination X. The following week, Marella added the TNA World Tag Team Champions (Nic Nemeth and Ryan Nemeth) to the match, turning it into a triple threat tag team match with the championship on the line; but a few hours away from the Countdown to Destination X show, TNA announced that Matt is "looking for a fight" at Destination X, indicating that the match had been cancelled.

On the October 22 episode of Impact!, TNA Director of Authority Santino Marella announced the Men's Ultimate X match to determine the number one contender for the TNA X Division Championship at Destination X. On the November 12 episode, TNA announced the participants: BDE, Joe Alonzo, John Skyler, KC Navarro, Cedric Alexander, and Rich Swann. A few hours before the Countdown to Destination X show, PWInsider reported that BDE and Swann had been pulled from the match.

On the October 22 episode of Impact!, TNA Director of Authority Santino Marella announced the Knockouts Ultimate X match to determine the number one contender for the TNA Knockouts World Championship at Destination X. On the November 12 episode, TNA announced the participants: Tasha Steelz, M by Elegance, Xia Brookside, Shotzi Blackheart, Gabby Forza, and Jada Stone. Due to travel issues, Brookside, Forza, and Stone were replaced by Heather by Elegance, Shayna Baszler, and Kiera Hogan.

On the October 22 episode of Impact!, Santino Marella announced the return of the World X-Cup at Destination X, featuring eight wrestlers representing their respective countries. Two four-way matches would take place, with both winners competing later that night. The following week, Belgian wrestler Ricky Sosa and Italian wrestler Fabian Aichner announced their entry into the tournament. On November 6, TNA announced that Mexican wrestler Rey Horus would return as a participant in the World X-Cup, marking his first appearance in the promotion since 2022. On November 9, TNA announced American wrestler and TNA International Champion Jason Hotch as the fourth entrant of the tournament. A day later, TNA announced The Home Town Man as the fifth entrant. Since Home Town Man's gimmick involves treating every city as his home, and Destination X will be held in Canada, he will represent the host country. TNA then announced Pakistani wrestler Amir Jordan as the sixth competitor. On the November 12 episode, TNA announced that the first round will take place on the Countdown to Destination X show. A few hours before the Countdown to Destination X show, Fightful reported that Horus could not compete and that the tournament will be converted into a five-way elimination match involving the remaining competitors.

== Event ==
Other on-screen personnel
Role	Name
Commentators	Tom Hannifan
Commentators	Matthew Rehwoldt
Referees	Michael Romo
Referees	Daniel Spencer
Referees	Frank Gastineau
Pre-show panel	Tom Hannifan
Pre-show panel	Matthew Rehwoldt

=== Pre-show ===
A. J. Francis appeared to announce that he had received permission from TNA President Carlos Silva to participate in the Men's Ultimate X match later that night.

Vincent interrupted Elijah's guitar performance, asking if Elijah wanted to be a champion or a mascot. Elijah warned Vincent not to interrupt him again, which prompted Vincent to attack Elijah. A referee then entered the ring to start the only match on the Countdown to Destination X show. In the end of the match, Elijah executed the "Highwaymen's Farewell" on Vincent, in which Elijah positioned Vincent upside down before dropping down to his knees to drop Vincent's head on the mat. Elijah then won the match via pinfall.

TNA Director of Authority Santino Marella addressed the travel issues, stating that some people were unable to make it to Destination X which forced TNA to make changes to the match card. TNA commentator Matthew Rehwoldt said that they are tracking Trey Miguel's travel status to determine if he could arrive before the main event.

=== Preliminary matches ===
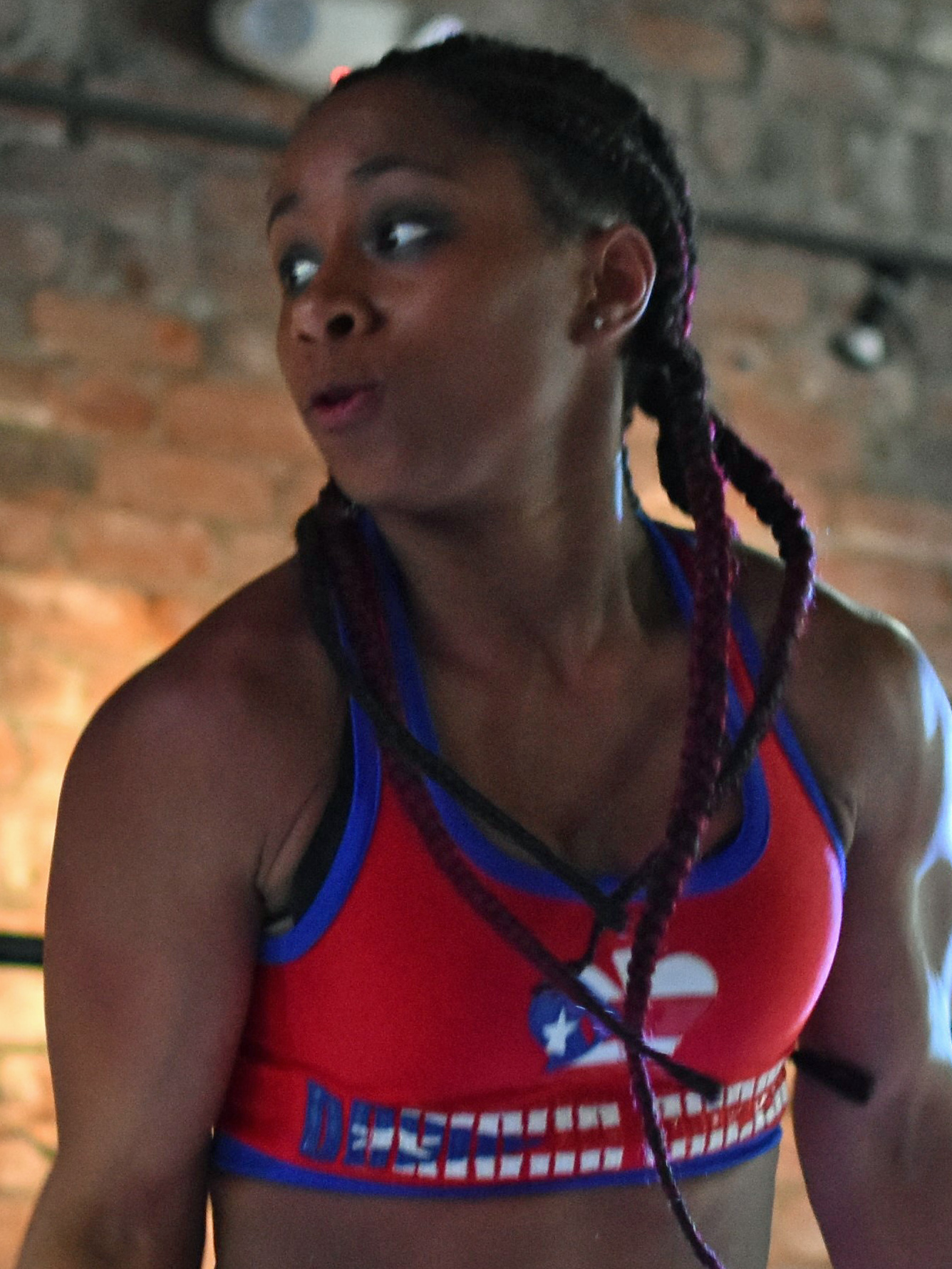
Knockouts Ultimate X match winner Tasha Steelz

Destination X opened with the Knockouts Ultimate X match to determine the number one contender to the TNA Knockouts World Championship, which involved TNA Knockouts World Tag Team Champion Shayna Baszler, Shotzi Blackheart, Fire 'n Flava members Kiera Hogan and Tasha Steelz, and The Elegance Brand members Heather by Elegance and TNA Knockouts Television Champion M by Elegance. The only way to win the match was to pull down the red "X" in the intersection of two cables above the ring that were attached to four trusses from the corners of the ring. Later into the match, Baszler locked in a sleeper hold on Heather, but M did not try to save Heather. M made an attempt to grab the X, but Baszler stopped her with a spear, charging towards M and driving her shoulder into M's midsection to force M down back-first into the mat. Blackheart went for the X, but Hogan stopped her with a kendo stick, repeatedly attacking her until Blackheart fell. Steelz then traversed across a cable to pull down the X and win the match.

"Broken" Matt Hardy then came out for a fight, still furious after Syx nearly killed his brother Jeff Hardy. He announced that none of the guys in his scheduled match are at the event, but he said that he would not leave until he has a match. Syx member Joseph Sawyer ambushed Matt, and security personnel separated Matt and Sawyer. TNA Director of Authority Santino Marella then officially announced Matt versus Sawyer in a No Disqualification match, where neither wrestler could be disqualification and the only ways to win were via pinfall or submission. Later into the match, Sawyer and Matt brought the fight into the crowd. At some point after they returned to the ring, Matt placed a garbage can over Sawyer's head and then hit the garbage can with a steel chair. He then hit Sawyer's head with the trash can before executing the "Twist of Fate" on Sawyer, pivoting 180° before falling down while grabbing Sawyer's head. Matt then placed a steel chair around Sawyer's neck for another "Twist of Fate" before winning the match via pinfall.

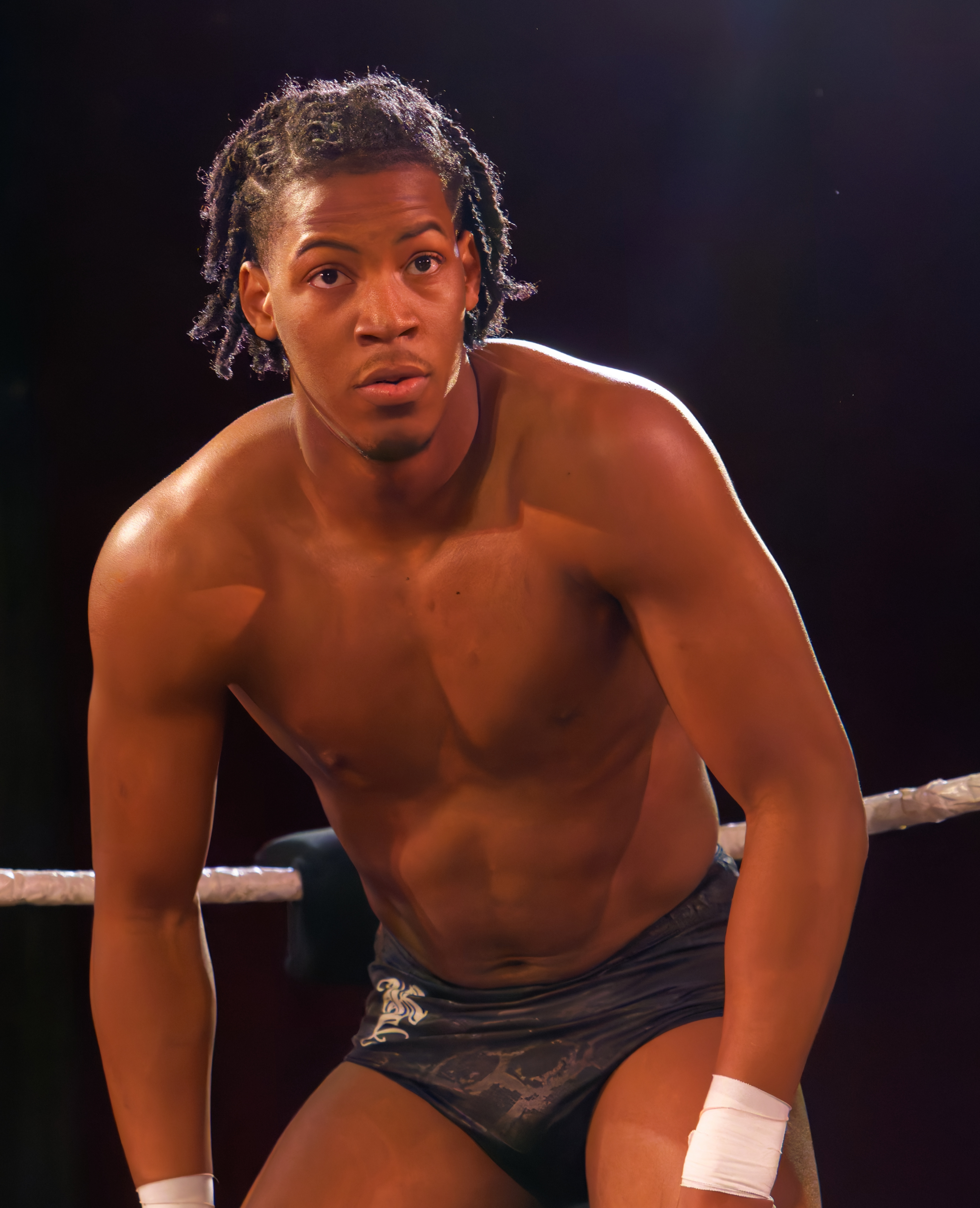
Ricky Sosa of Belgium won the 2026 World X-Cup.

Next, the 2026 World X-Cup five-way elimination match involving Pakistan's Amir Jordan, Italy's Fabian Aichner, United States representative and TNA International Champion Jason Hotch, Belgium's Ricky Sosa, and host country Canada's The Home Town Man, who was wearing an Edmonton Oilers jersey. Home Town Man scored the first elimination when he pinned Jordan following a "Sliced Bread", in which Home Town Man backflipped over Jordan to drive Jordan down back-first. Hotch then put Home Town Man in a "Sharpshooter", evoking the Montreal Screwjob, until Sosa saved Home Town Man. Aichner executed a powerbomb on Home Town Man, slamming Home Town Man off his shoulders, before pinning and eliminating Home Town Man. Aichner scored another elimination when he executed a moonsault on Hotch, in which Aichner backflipped off of the top rope onto a supine Hotch, before pinning Hotch. In the final moments of the match, Sosa landed a jumping knee strike and flying back elbows before pinning Aichner to win the 2026 World X-Cup.

Prior to the next match, TNA revealed that Trey Miguel had arrived less than an hour before the main event, signifying that the main event would continue as scheduled.

Following that reveal, Mustafa Ali challenged Frankie Kazarian for the Call Your Shot Gauntlet trophy and title opportunity. Later into the match, Kazarian accidentally fell into the referee, prompting the referee to scold Kazarian. As Kazarian and Ali fought ringside, both managed to return to the ring before the count of ten. Following Kazarian and Ali pushing the referee away, they ignored the orders of the referee as they continued to brawl, which forced the referee to disqualify both competitors and end the match in a no contest. Ali then struck Kazarian's groin. After Ali slapped the timekeeper, he took the ring bell and placed it on Kazarian's head before repeatedly hitting the bell with a hammer. As Kazarian rested his head on a truss, Ali hit Kazarian's head with a steel chair. He then told the crowd that they are "pieces of crap" and stating that no one backstage is on his level.

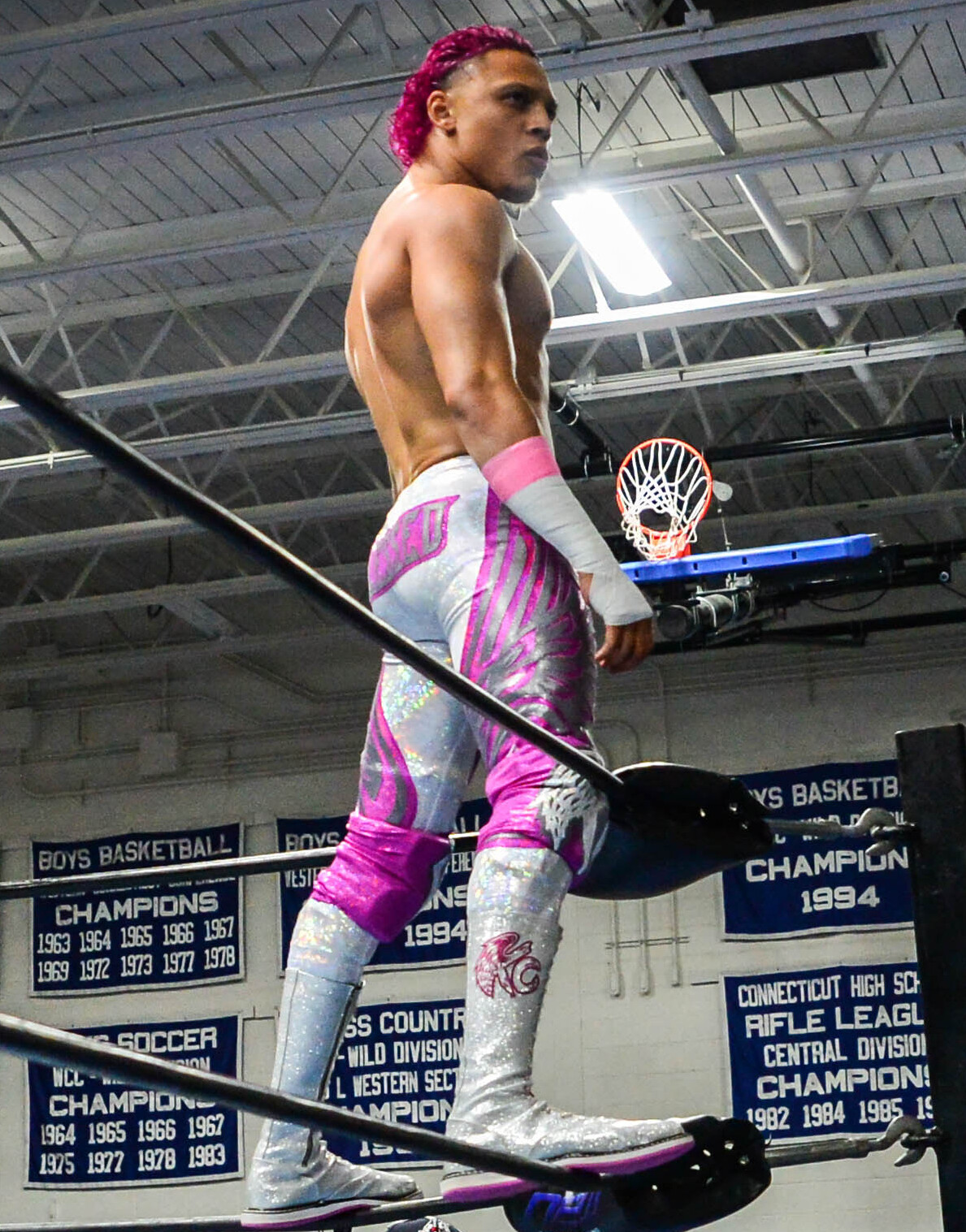
Men's Ultimate X match winner KC Navarro

The penultimate match was the Men's Ultimate X match to determine the number one contender to the TNA X Division Championship. The participants of the match were A. J. Francis, Cedric Alexander, Joe Alonzo, John Skyler, and KC Navarro. Prior to the start of the match, TNA Director of Authority Santino Marella announced the sixth participant: former two-time TNA X Division Champion TJP, who made his return to TNA since Multiverse United 2 on August 20, 2023. Later into the match, as TJP and Navarro fought in the corner, TJP blinded Navarro by spraying mist into Navarro's eyes. When TJP was close to grabbing the X, Navarro stopped TJP with an attack. Alonzo then attacked Navarro and scaled the cable, but Francis pulled Alonzo down and threw him onto three other competitors on the outside. Navarro unhooked the X, but he needed to land on the mat to win the match. Francis tried to prevent Navarro from landing on the mat, but Navarro executed an attack on Francis and landed on the mat with the X; Navarro was then declared the winner.

=== Main event ===
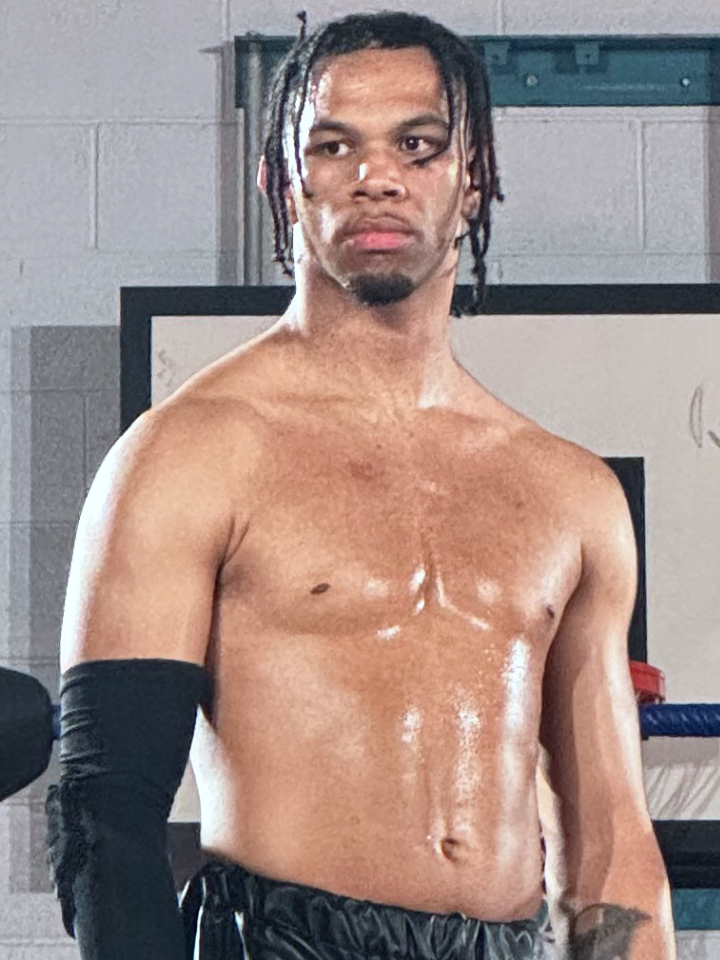
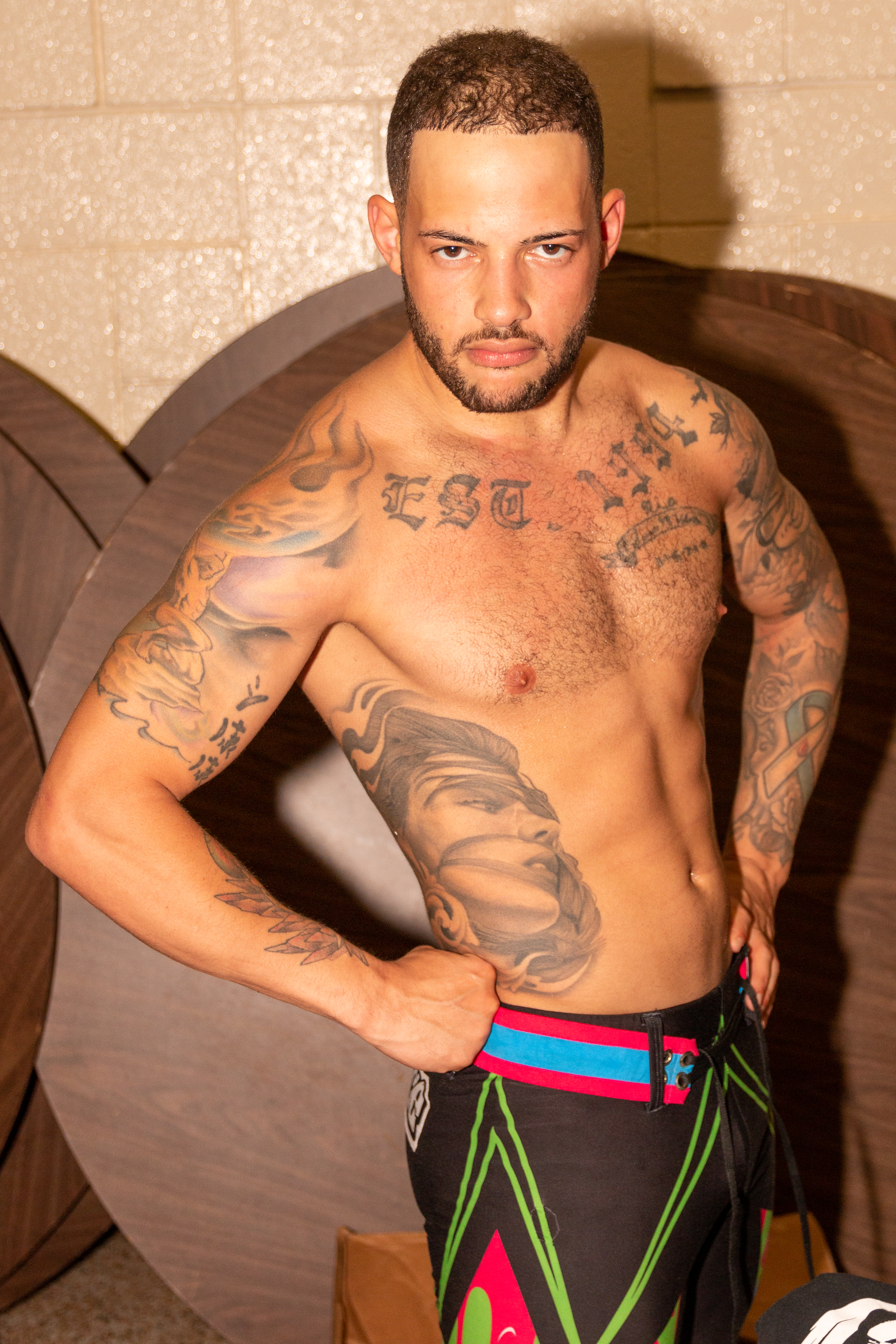
Despite the travel issues, the TNA World Championship main event between defending champion Leon Slater and Trey Miguel took place as scheduled.

In the main event, Leon Slater defended the TNA World Championship against Trey Miguel. The two competitors began the match with a handshake. Later into the match, Miguel attempted to dive through the ropes, but Slater blocked him. Slater then dropped Miguel onto the steel steps face-first, causing Miguel to bleed across his forehead. Slater then attempted multiple pinfalls to try to end the match without further injuring Miguel. After taking two consecutive kicks to the back of the head, Miguel collapsed in the corner. Slater attempted another pinfall, but Miguel kicked out. Miguel eventually fought back, dropping Slater face-first onto the exposed steel turnbuckle. As Slater was standing on the apron, Miguel executed a "Meteora" onto Slater, dropping both of his knees onto Slater's shoulders, which sent both men to the floor; Miguel then began clutching his sore knee, which had been previously broken earlier in the year. Back in the ring, Slater later countered Miguel's "Meteora" attempt by rolling through and applying a half crab, but Miguel forced Slater to break the hold by ripping at Slater's face. Slater later avoided another "Meteora" attempt by Miguel and kicked Miguel's face before executing a Swanton 450° onto Miguel, jumping off the top rope with his arms outstretched before flipping forward 450° and then landing on a supine Miguel. Slater then successfully pinned Miguel to retain the TNA World Championship.

== Reception ==
On November 16, 2026, WrestleTix reported an estimate of 2,089 tickets distributed at the Edmonton Expo Centre in Edmonton, Alberta, Canada, for the 2026 edition of Destination X.

=== Critical reception ===
Ryan Ciocco of 411Mania gave Destination X an overall grade of 9 out of 10, saying that it exceeded his expectations and was “even more impressive” given the changes to the card forced by travel issues. His colleague Thomas Hall rated it 8 out of 10, saying that most of the matches worked well despite circumstances beyond TNA’s control, and concluded that the event was a “pretty big success”. Chris Vetter of Pro Wrestling Dot Net praised TNA for putting on “one heckuva show” despite the cancellations and lineup changes in a few matches. Rafael Indi of Súper Luchas gave the event 3.5 out of 5 spades, observing that TNA’s shows with less hype often turn out better than more heavily promoted ones, and that the promotion transforms for pay-per-view events, to the point that it is hard to believe it is the same one that produces Thursday Night Impact!

Hall gave Elijah versus Vincent a “C”, commending the two wrestlers for being "perfectly well" at warming up the crowd despite not being in the original match card.

Indi gave the Knockouts Ultimate X match 3 1/4 out of 5 spades, calling it “well-executed” considering that half of the original lineup had been changed. Indi found the contrast between the alliances of The Elegance Brand (M by Elegance and Heather by Elegance) and Fire 'n Flava (Tasha Steelz and Kiera Hogan) to be the most interesting part of the match, describing M as ruthless for letting Shayna Baszler strangle Heather, and attributing Steelz’s victory to her sisterhood with Hogan, who fended off their opponents while Steelz went for the “X”. Ciocco was less forgiving of the circumstances, complaining about the short match time and arguing that more time would have “[fleshed] out the show”, although he acknowledged that it was still a fun match and rated it 3 3/4 out of 5 stars. In contrast, Hall gave the match a “C+”, saying the shorter run time was a benefit that made for a “pretty crisp match”.

Ciocco rated Matt Hardy versus Joseph Sawyer 3.25 out of 5 stars. Although he was initially skeptical because the match was only a fraction of the larger story between The Hardys and Syx, he praised both wrestlers, particularly Hardy, who proved he was still willing to sacrifice his body despite his age. Indi was less impressed, giving it 2 3/4 out of 5 spades and calling it a “rather unsubstantial ‘extreme’ contribution”. Hall gave the match a “C+”, saying that TNA did their best given the circumstances by turning a personal issue into a match.

Vetter said that the World X-Cup surpassed all expectations. Ciocco rated it 4 1/2 out of 5 stars, saying that everyone received a chance to shine, while Indi gave it 4 out of 5 spades and described it as “remarkable”, praising the decision to turn the event from a single-elimination tournament into an elimination match. Hall gave it a “B”, saying that Fabian Aichner looked good despite suffering a loss, while the other three losing competitors were “just kind of there”.

Hall gave Mustafa Ali versus Frankie Kazarian a “B”, describing it as being as good as it looked on paper and adding that the short runtime made it better. Ciocco rated it 4 out of 5 stars, writing that the “shit” finish should not detract from a match that was “built beautifully” with mind games at the center of the in-ring action. Indi gave it 3 out of 5 spades, saying that the wrestlers’ experience made a high-quality match that was spoiled by the ending. Vetter deemed it the third best match of the night.

Ciocco rated the Men’s Ultimate X match 3 3/4 out of 5 stars, saying it was not “a drag in the least” because A. J. Francis served as a foil for the smaller competitors, and that the winner was the most obvious choice. Indi gave it 3 1/2 out of 5 spades, saying the circumstances were resolved gracefully and that the ending was narratively rich because KC Navarro was Francis’ former ally. Hall gave the match a “B”, saying it was better than the Knockouts Ultimate X match and that Navarro and Francis helped elevate it.

Vetter called the main event the match of the night. Ciocco rated it 4 3/4 out of 5 stars, saying that it had a perfect build, executed the correct spots, used breaks to its advantage, and had an “insane” finish that showed both Leon Slater and Trey Miguel’s unwillingness to lose easily. He added that the match deserved recognition as one of the best of 2026 across all promotions and among fans. Indi gave it 4 1/4 out of 5 spades, while Hall gave it a “B+”, saying that Slater and Miguel “more than delivered” as the only match on the card with a proper build and that the main event stole the show.

== Results ==
No.	Results	Stipulations	Times
1^{P}	Elijah defeated Vincent by pinfall	Singles match	7:19
2	Tasha Steelz defeated Heather by Elegance, Kiera Hogan, M by Elegance, Shayna Baszler, and Shotzi Blackheart (Note: Xia Brookside, Gabby Forza, and Jada Stone were originally scheduled to compete in the Knockouts Ultimate X match, but due to travel issues caused by a ground stop issued by the Federal Aviation Administration, they were replaced by Heather by Elegance, Shayna Baszler, and Kiera Hogan.)	Knockouts Ultimate X match to determine the number one contender to the TNA Knockouts World Championship	9:10
3	Matt Hardy defeated Joseph Sawyer by pinfall (Note: Matt Hardy and Joseph Sawyer were originally scheduled to compete in a three-way tag team match for the TNA World Tag Team Championship, but due to travel issues, the match was cancelled.)	No Disqualification match This was an open challenge.	15:00
4	Ricky Sosa defeated Amir Jordan, The Home Town Man, Jason Hotch, and Fabian Aichner (Note: Rey Horus was originally slated to compete in the World X-Cup, but due to travel issues, he was pulled from the tournament.)	2026 World X-Cup Five-way elimination match (Note: The World X-Cup was originally a single-elimination tournament with the first round consisting of two triple threat matches, but due to travel issues, the tournament was turned into a five-way elimination match.)	19:33
5	Mustafa Ali vs. Frankie Kazarian ended in a no contest	Singles match for the Call Your Shot Gauntlet trophy	15:30
6	KC Navarro defeated A. J. Francis, Cedric Alexander, Joe Alonzo, John Skyler, and TJP (Note: BDE and Rich Swann were originally scheduled to compete in the match, but due to travel issues, they both were removed from the match.)	Men's Ultimate X match to determine the number one contender to the TNA X Division Championship	12:27
7	Leon Slater (c) defeated Trey Miguel by pinfall	Singles match for the TNA World Championship	31:48
(c) / – the champion(s) heading into the match; P / – the match was broadcast on the pre-show

=== 2026 World X-Cup ===
Order of elimination
No.	Wrestler	Eliminated by	Method	Time
1	(Pakistan) Amir Jordan	The Home Town Man	Pinfall	6:24
2	(Canada) The Home Town Man	Fabian Aichner	Pinfall	8:31
3	(United States) Jason Hotch	Fabian Aichner	Pinfall	11:58
4	(Italy) Fabian Aichner	Ricky Sosa	Pinfall	19:33
—	(Belgium) Ricky Sosa	Winner		
