= Ricky Sosa =

Dutch-born Belgian professional wrestler (born 2004)

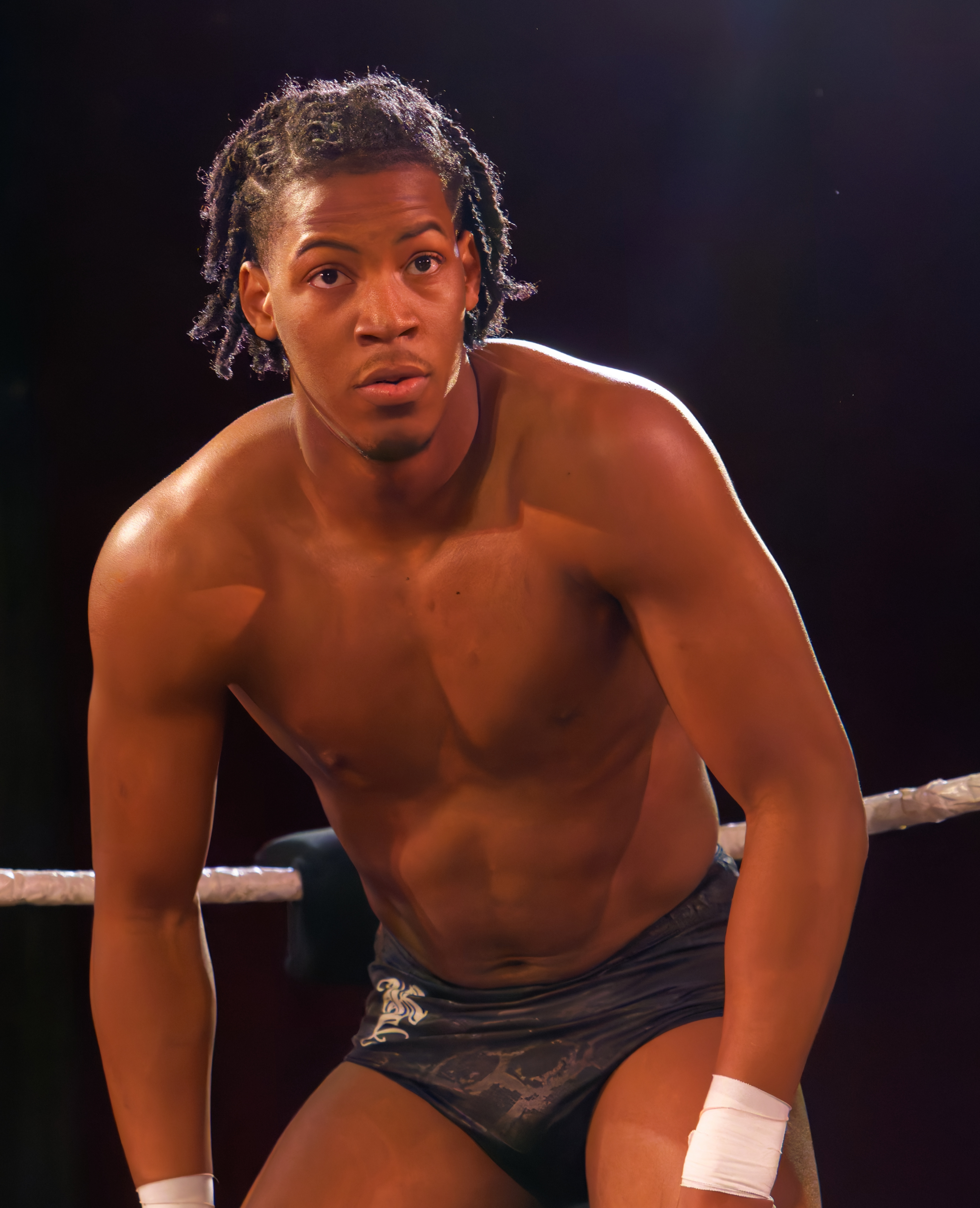
- Sosa in March 2025

Personal information
- Born: Noël Allaly; 14 December 2004 (age 21) Zoetermeer, Netherlands

Professional wrestling career
- Ring name: Ricky Star; Ricky Sosa
- Billed height: 6 ft 4 in (193 cm)
- Billed weight: 209 lb (95 kg)
- Billed from: Brussels, Belgium
- Trained by: Caiman Jr. Shaolin Simba; PWH Academy
- Debut: 6 November 2021

Noël Allaly (born 14 December 2004), better known by his ring name Ricky Sosa, is a Dutch-born Belgian professional wrestler. He is signed to Total Nonstop Action Wrestling (TNA). He also makes appearances on the European independent circuit for promotions such as Westside Xtreme Wrestling (wXw), where he is a former wXw European Champion, and Legion Wrestling, where he is the current Legion Industrial Champion.

Sosa gained international viral fame through his entrance, which features the 2014 French rap track "Sosa" by 40000 Gang.

== Early life ==
Noël Allaly was born on 14 December 2004 in Zoetermeer, Netherlands.

== Professional wrestling career ==
=== European independent circuit (2021–present) ===
Allaly began his training in 2021 and was trained by Caiman Jr. and Shaolin Simba in Belgium. He also trained at the PWH Academy. He made his debut on 6 November 2021, originally competing under the ring name Ricky Star before transitioning to Ricky Sosa. In 2023, Sosa co-founded the stable Top Dawgs Family alongside Mecca, A-Buck, and Christianium Le Surrealiste.

Sosa won his first professional title on 31 May 2024, defeating Scotty Valentine for the PWH Television Championship at Pro Wrestling Holland's (PWH) "Market Kabaal" event. On 20 October, Sosa and Top Dawgs Family stablemate Mecca captured the APC Tag Team Championship from Niouks (Cosmik Ben and Ravage) at the Association les Professionnels du Catch's (APC) "International Control" event. In subsequent years, Sosa became the inaugural holder of the Legion Industrial Championship in 2025 and the KHAO Championship in 2026. He also gained international viral fame through his entrance, which features the 2014 French rap track "Sosa" by 40000 Gang.

=== Westside Xtreme Wrestling (2025–present) ===
Sosa debuted in Westside Xtreme Wrestling (wXw) at the "Extreme Wrestling Party" event on 26 September 2025, in a losing effort against Zoltan. At the wXw 25th Anniversary event on 13 December, Sosa defeated Zoltan and Joseph Fenech Jr. in a three-way match to win the vacant wXw European Championship. In early 2026, Sosa defeated WWE ID Champion Cappuccino Jones in a non-title match at "We Love Wrestling 72", though he failed to capture the title in a rematch the following day. Though originally scheduled for the 16 Carat Gold Tournament in March 2026, Sosa withdrew to pursue a "major career opportunity", which was later revealed to be his scheduled matches in Total Nonstop Action Wrestling. His reign as wXw European Champion would come to an end on 11 April edition of "We Love Wrestling" after losing to Zoltan. A rematch was set on 30 May edition "We Love Wrestling", where Sosa failed to reclaim the title from Zoltan.

=== Total Nonstop Action Wrestling (2026–present) ===
On 5 March 2026, Total Nonstop Action Wrestling (TNA) announced that Sosa would debut for the promotion during their events in Atlanta, Georgia, United States. In his televised debut on 12 March episode of Thursday Night Impact!, Sosa defeated Brad Attitude. At Sacrifice on 27 March, Sosa officially signed with TNA. After the signing, Sosa began a feud with Eric Young, leading to Sosa defeating Young on the Countdown to Slammiversary on 28 June. After defeating Young, Sosa began feuding with The System (Eddie Edwards, Bear Bronson, Brian Myers, Cedric Alexander, and Alisha Edwards) after declining to join the stable. During the feud, Sosa aligned with Leon Slater. On 23 August at Lockdown, Sosa teamed with Fabian Aichner, KC Navarro, and Jada Stone in a losing effort against The System in a Lethal Lockdown match. On 11 October at Bound for Glory, Sosa defeated Edwards, ending his feud with The System. At Destination X on November 15, Sosa defeated four other competitors in a five-way elimination match to win the 2026 World X-Cup.

== Championships and accomplishments ==
- Association les Professionnels du Catch
  - APC Tag Team Championship (1 time) – with Mecca
- BodyZoi Factory
  - BodyZoi Championship (1 time, inaugural, current)
- Catch As Catch Can
  - CACC France Championship (1 time)
- KHAO
  - KHAO Championship (1 time, inaugural)
- Legion Wrestling
  - Legion Industrial Championship (1 time, inaugural)
- Pro Wrestling Holland
  - PWH Television Championship (1 time)
- Pro Wrestling Illustrated
  - Ranked No. 312 of the top singles wrestlers in the PWI 500 in 2026
- Superstar Wrestling
  - Superstar Wrestling Tag Team Championship (1 time) – with Daniel Akindele
- Ring Performance
  - Ring Performance Tag Team Championship (1 time, current) – with Baadshah Pehalwan Khan
- Total Nonstop Action Wrestling
  - World X-Cup (2026)
- Westside Xtreme Wrestling
  - wXw European Championship (1 time)
- World Catch League
  - Belgian Cup (2026)
- World Series Wrestling
  - WSW Australian Championship (1 time)
