= Bound for Glory (2026) =

TNA professional wrestling event

- Promotional poster featuring Nic Nemeth and Leon Slater
- Promotion: Total Nonstop Action Wrestling
- Date: October 11, 2026
- City: Tampa, Florida, U.S.
- Venue: Yuengling Center
- Attendance: 2,419

Pay-per-view chronology
| ← Previous; Lockdown | Next → Destination X |

Bound for Glory chronology
| ← Previous; 2025 | Next → — |

The 2026 Bound for Glory, also promoted as Bound for Glory: Tampa, was a professional wrestling pay-per-view (PPV) event produced by Total Nonstop Action Wrestling (TNA). It took place on Sunday, October 11, 2026, at Yuengling Center in Tampa, Florida, United States. It was the 22nd event under the Bound for Glory chronology. The event featured the TNA Hall of Fame inductions of four-time TNA Knockouts Champion ODB, four-time TNA X Division Champion Amazing Red, and two-time NWA World Tag Team Champion Konnan.

Nine matches were contested at the event. In the main event, Leon Slater defeated Nic Nemeth to win the TNA World Championship. In other prominent matches, Indi Hartwell defeated Xia Brookside to win the TNA Knockouts World Championship, Jason Hotch defeated Mustafa Ali, John Skyler, and Special Agent 0 in a The Order 4-Way match to win the TNA International Championship, Frankie Kazarian last eliminated Trey Miguel to win his record third Call Your Shot Gauntlet match, and Amazing Red defeated BDE, Cedric Alexander, Fabian Aichner, KC Navarro, Rich Swann, and Ryan Nemeth in a seven-way scramble to win the vacant TNA X Division Championship. It also featured the TNA debuts of Shayna Baszler and Erick Redbeard, as well as the TNA in-ring debuts of Avery Styles and Joseph Sawyer. The event also marked the TNA debut and only appearance of Max Caster, who was released from the company following his unscripted and unapproved statements during the event that referred to the October 2026 attacks on Saudi Arabia airports.

== Production ==
=== Background ===
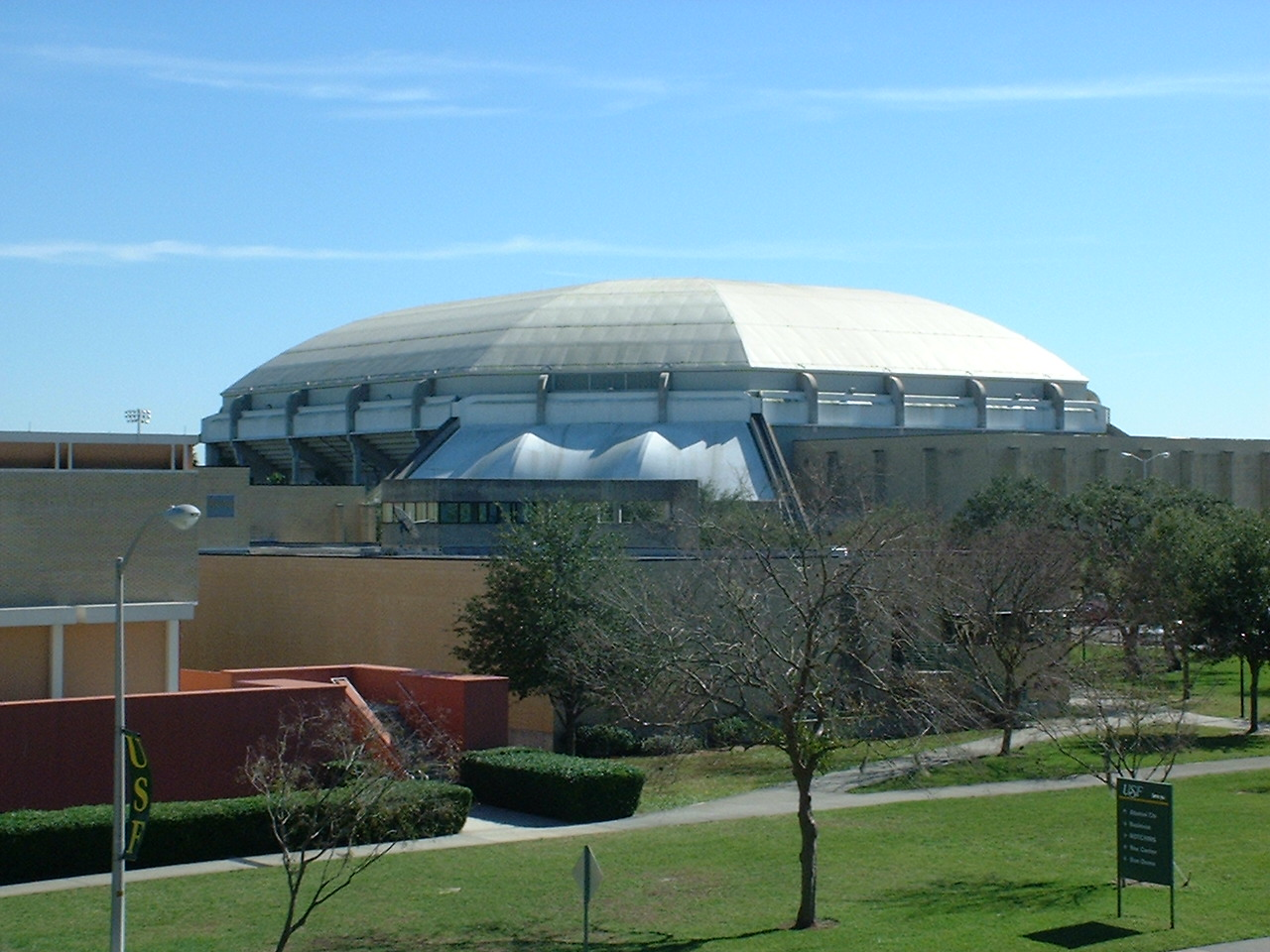
Bound for Glory took place at Yuengling Center in Tampa, Florida, United States.

Bound for Glory is a professional wrestling pay-per-view (PPV) event produced by Total Nonstop Action Wrestling (TNA). The event was created in 2005 to serve as the company's flagship PPV event, similar to WWE's WrestleMania, in which wrestlers competed in various professional wrestling match types in what was the culmination of many feuds and storylines that occurred during the calendar year.

On April 9, 2026, TNA announced its event schedule for the remainder of the year. Included in the announcement was Bound for Glory, which was scheduled to take place on Sunday, October 11, at Yuengling Center in Tampa, Florida, United States. On October 1, TNA announced that TNA Hall of Famer Mickie James would appear at Bound for Glory.

=== Hall of Fame ===
At Rebellion on April 11, ODB's induction into the TNA Hall of Fame at Bound for Glory was announced. At Slammiversary on June 28, TNA announced Amazing Red's induction into the TNA Hall of Fame. Later that night, Mike Santana announced Konnan's induction into the TNA Hall of Fame. on October 9, TNA announced that Al Snow and TNA Hall of Famer Traci Brooks would induct ODB, Frankie Kazarian would induct Red, and Santana, now known as Cruz Montana, would induct Konnan. ODB was confirmed to be presented by TNA Hall of Famer Earl Hebner.

=== Storylines ===
The event featured professional wrestling matches that involve different wrestlers from pre-existing scripted feuds and storylines. Wrestlers portray villains, heroes, or less distinguishable characters in scripted events that built tension and culminate in a wrestling match or series of matches.

==== World championship matches ====
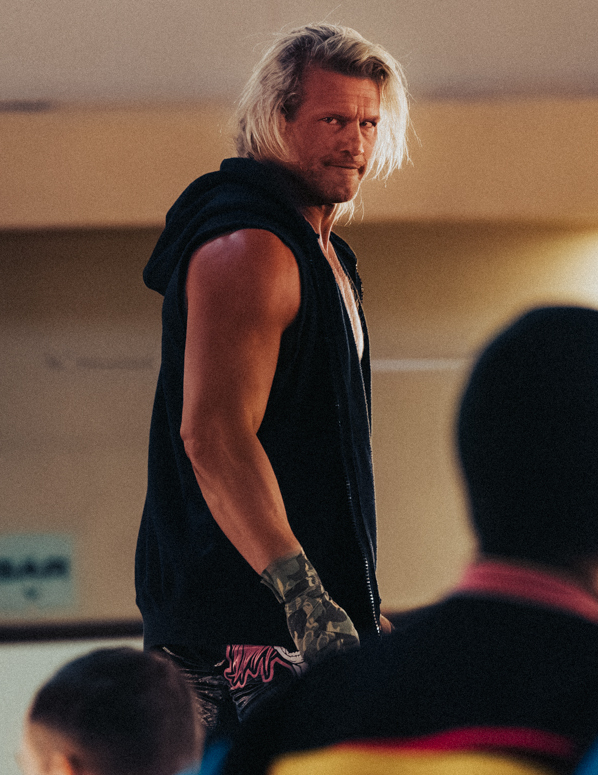
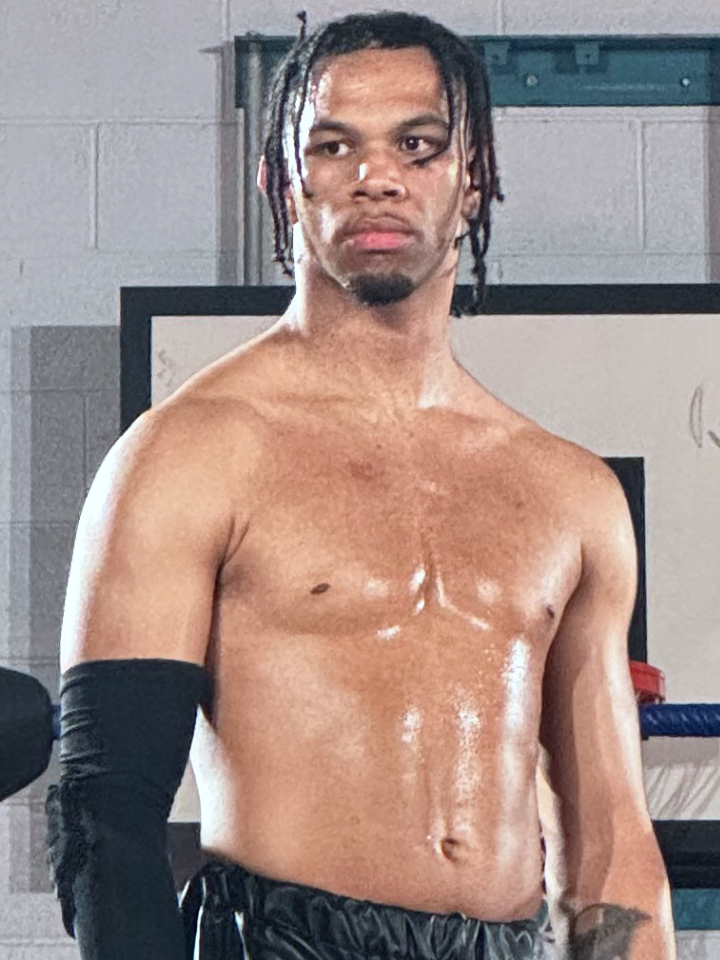
Nic Nemeth defended the TNA World Championship against Leon Slater at Bound for Glory. Slater, who was the TNA X Division Champion, relinquished his title to invoke Option C for this world championship opportunity.

At Lockdown on August 23, 2026, Leon Slater defeated Cedric Alexander in a Last Man Standing Steel Cage match to regain the TNA X Division Championship and save the recognition of his initial title reign. Later that night, The Nemeths (TNA World Champion Nic Nemeth and Ryan Nemeth) won the TNA World Tag Team Championship. Slater interrupted their celebration to confront Nic and announce that he was invoking Option C to challenge Nic for the TNA World Championship at Bound for Glory. He then relinquished the TNA X Division Championship to make it official. Nic tried to retaliate, but Slater laid out The Nemeths instead. On the August 6 episode of Thursday Night Impact!, Slater expressed to Nic his desire to become the youngest TNA World Champion. He also teased going after The Nemeths' TNA World Tag Team Championship with Ricky Sosa, who appeared. Despite Ryan's objection, TNA Director of Authority Santino Marella announced that Slater and Sosa would challenge The Nemeths for the TNA World Tag Team Championship later that night, but they were unsuccessful after Nic pinned Sosa. On the September 10 episode, Slater was found knocked out on a forklift; Ryan was the suspected perpetrator. A week later, Slater blamed Ryan for the attack on him the previous week and then later defeated Ryan. Following the match, The Nemeths attacked Slater. On the September 24 episode, Slater claimed that Nic is nervous because Slater is improving while Nic is declining, but Nic opposed, stating that he is not afraid of Slater. Ryan tried to ambush Slater, but Slater knew Ryan was behind him, and a brawl ensued. Security personnel tried to intervene but Slater and Nic overpowered them to continue the brawl. Marella then appeared to announce that Slater and Nic were forbidden from touching each other until Bound for Glory, or else Nic would be stripped of his title and Slater would lose his title shot. The following week, Slater quickly defeated Joe Alonzo with Nic in commentary. Following the match, Nic tried to enter the ring but he backed away and ran backstage when Slater ran towards him. Following The Nemeths' successful defense of the TNA World Tag Team Championship on the October 8 episode with Slater on commentary, Nic was taunting Slater to entice Slater to attack him before the lights went off. After the lights came back on, Slater had been seemingly attacked as he lay down hurt on the floor.

On the Countdown to Lockdown pre-show, Indi Hartwell claimed that she is the next challenger for the TNA Knockouts World Championship, but TNA Director of Operations Daria Rae opposed her claim, stating that title shots are not given but earned. On the August 27 episode of Impact!, Hartwell said that she is pissed off because of what Rae said. Rae said that Hartwell does not know how the real world works and called Hartwell "underperforming, undeserving, and mediocre". Hartwell argued that Rae was projecting Rae's failed career on her. The debuting Zoey Serrano (formerly Zoey Stark in WWE) then ambushed Hartwell. The following week, Hartwell and Harley Hudson fought TNA Knockouts World Champion Xia Brookside and Serrano, where Hartwell forced Brookside to submit to win the match. Later that night, Hartwell asked Rae for a title shot, but Rae refused and gave a title shot to Gabby Forza instead. A week later, Brookside was defending her title against Forza. As Brookside tried to leave mid-match, Hartwell blocked her path, prompting Rae to confront Hartwell. Brookside would later use the title belt to defeat Forza and retain her title. On the September 24 episode, Hartwell provoked Rae into slapping her, only to reveal that it was filmed by TNA Director of Authority Santino Marella to get the board of directors to suspend Rae. Marella would later declare that Brookside would defend the TNA Knockouts World Championship against Hartwell at Bound for Glory. Later that night, Serrano promised Rae that she would ensure that Hartwell would not make it to Bound for Glory. The following week, Hartwell went one-on-one against Serrano, which ended via disqualification after Serrano hit Hartwell with a steel chair. Following the match, Serrano continued to assault Hartwell until she chose to leave the ring. Brookside then appeared to attack Hartwell with the title belt. The following week, TNA announced that TNA Hall of Famer Mickie James, previously announced to appear at Bound for Glory, would be the special guest referee for the title match.

==== The Breakup of Order 4 ====
On the July 30 episode of Impact, Mustafa Ali defended the TNA International Championship against his Order 4 stablemate Jason Hotch. Ali attacked Hotch with the title belt, which prompted Order 4 member and Hotch's The Great Hands partner John Skyler to take the belt away from Ali. When Ali illegally used the ropes as leverage to pin Hotch, Order 4 member Tasha Steelz pushed Ali's feet off the ropes. After Order 4 member Mila Moore confronted Steelz, the two women had a fight; Skyler and Order 4 member Special Agent 0 pulled them away from each other and brought them backstage. Afterwards, Hotch attacked and pinned Ali to win the title with his family in attendance. The following week, after attempting to seduce Hotch's wife, Hotch furiously offered a title match against Ali at Lockdown and left Order 4. Hotch asked Skyler to leave with him, but he declined, claiming that he needed the job. On the August 20 episode, Ali forced Skyler to challenge Hotch for the title, but it ended in a no contest after Agent 0 attacked Hotch. At Lockdown, Ali reclaimed the title after defeating Hotch in a Steel Cage match. Following the match, Skyler helped Hotch go backstage.

Because Ali was injured in kayfabe on the August 27 episode of Impact!, Moore said that Skyler was Order 4's de facto leader; Steelz felt disrespected with that remark. Later that night, Hotch and Trey Miguel defeated Skyler and Agent 0 after Miguel pinned Skyler. Following the match, a video played of an injured Ali on a hospital bed, proposing a truce between Hotch and him. A week later, Moore was on a phone call with Ali when Skyler tried to ask her out, but she ignored him as she walked away. Later that night, Miguel and Hotch fought to become the number one contender for the TNA International Championship, but it ended in a no contest after Agent 0 attacked both men. The following week, Hotch fought Agent 0 with Moore as the special guest referee. Moore, however, would not do her job as the referee as she was distracted by her fingernails. Steelz then confronted Moore and ripped Moore's shirt. Embarrassed, Moore ran backstage, and Steelz replaced Moore as the special guest referee. When Hotch attempted a pinfall, Steelz counted fast, giving the win to Hotch. On the September 17 episode, Skyler tried to ask Moore again, but he overheard her say that she would not go out with someone like him. The following week, Ali was furious at Moore for making him the defend his title against Hotch and Miguel in a triple threat match, prompting Skyler to yell at Ali, who reminded Skyler about what Moore said the previous week. Moore later thanked Skyler; as she leaned in to kiss Skyler, Ali interrupted by yelling at them. Moore then told Ali that Skyler and her were quitting Order 4. Later that night as Ali had his title defense, Ali ordered Steelz to give him the title belt, but Hotch prevented it while accidentally hitting Steelz. As Hotch checked on Steelz, Ali took advantage by sending Hotch into the ringpost. Ali then hit Miguel with the title belt to retain his title.

On the October 1 episode of Impact!, Hotch was furious at Skyler for not leaving Order 4 when he asked but left with Moore instead. Skyler said that he is happy with Moore and wondered if his The Great Hands partner would be there in their match later that night. The Great Hands, with Skyler being accompanied by Moore, took on Order 4, accompanied by Steelz, which ended with Ali forcing Skyler to submit. Following the match, Ali ordered Agent 0 to attack Hotch. Agent 0 initially ignored him before going after Hotch; he kept ignoring Ali's commands but listened when Steelz ordered him, which infuriated Ali. Steelz ordered Agent 0 to attack Ali, and Agent 0 followed her command. As Moore was checking on Skyler, Steelz commanded Agent 0 to attack Moore. After Agent 0 attacked Moore, Agent 0, with the TNA International Championship belt in hand, stood next to Steelz. Later that night at backstage, Skyler sought medical assistance on behalf of Moore, and Ali was furious at Steelz. Hotch then appeared, which led to Hotch fighting Agent 0 and Skyler fighting Ali. After security personnel pulled them apart, TNA Director of Authority Santino Marella announced a four-way match for the TNA International Championship involving reigning champion Ali, Hotch, Skyler, and Agent 0 at Bound for Glory.

The following week, Order 4 had a final meeting, where Ali warned the others that this would be their last chance to follow Ali's orders again. Hotch shared that he regrets hurting Ali and putting him in the hospital for harassing his wife and frightening his daughter, and added that he should have put him “in the graveyard”. Skyler said that his family is now Mila Moore and not Order 4. Skyler then called Ali an "obnoxious and overbearing asshole". Steelz said that Agent 0 and her could no longer stand sacrificing themselves for Ali's benefit. Ali responded by calling everyone "ungrateful swine and worthless pigs" before claiming that they owe their lives to him. Ali then declared that he would destroy his creation, Order 4, at Bound for Glory.

==== Other matches ====
Following Leon Slater's decision to vacate the TNA X Division Championship to invoke Option C, TNA Director of Authority Santino Marella announced on August 27 that a series of qualifying matches would be held with the winner of each match advancing to a six-way match for the vacant title at Bound for Glory. KC Navarro was the first to qualify by beating Joe Alonzo on the September 3 episode of Impact!. Fabian Aichner defeated Rohit Raju the following week to qualify. On September 14, TNA announced that former champion Cedric Alexander, whom Slater defeated to win the title at Lockdown, automatically qualified due to his mandatory rematch clause. On the September 17 episode of Impact!, Rich Swann defeated LJ Cleary in the fourth qualifier. The following week, Ryan Nemeth became the next wrestler to qualify after defeating KJ Orso. BDE secured the final spot on the October 1 episode by defeating Mr. Elegance, which was also BDE's first singles victory in TNA. During the TNA Hall of Fame ceremony right before the start of Bound for Glory, 2026 TNA Hall of Famer Amazing Red announced that he would compete in the match for the vacant TNA X Division Champion, turning it into a seven-way scramble.

On the July 2 episode of Impact!, Ricky Sosa declined the offer to join The System, which prompted an attack on Sosa. Leon Slater came out to help Sosa but he was unsuccessful. Over the following weeks, Sosa would come out to help various wrestlers against The System. At Lockdown, The System (Eddie Edwards, Brian Myers, Bronson, and Alisha Edwards) fought Sosa, Fabian Aichner, KC Navarro, and Jada Stone in a Lethal Lockdown match, where The System came out victorious after Eddie pinned Sosa. On the September 10 episode of Impact!, Eddie stated that Sosa was at the top of the list of people who do not belong in TNA. Sosa appeared and proposed a tag team match between Elijah and him and two members of The System, which Eddie accepted. The following week, Sosa and Elijah defeated Eddie and Alexander. Following the match, Eddie attacked Sosa with a steel chair while his stablemates attacked Elijah into the ring steps. Eddie then challenged Sosa to a match at Bound for Glory where they can determine if Sosa belongs in TNA. On the September 24 episode, Sosa helped Elijah get a win over Eddie by taking out Bronson and Myers. The following week, Sosa was in a match against Alexander. Alisha distracted referee to allow Eddie to hit Sosa's groin. Alexander then proceeded to attack Sosa before pinning him to win the match.

As is tradition at Bound for Glory, the Call Your Shot Gauntlet will take place, with the winner receiving the eponymous trophy, which they can cash in for a future championship match at any time of their choosing. On the September 24 episode of Impact!, it was announced that Bear Bronson, Frankie Kazarian, and Avery Styles were the first confirmed competitors, with this marking Styles' in-ring debut in TNA. On the October 2 episode, six more competitors were confirmed: A. J. Francis, Brian Myers, Elijah, Joe Alonzo, The Home Town Man, and Trey Miguel. Harley Hudson was also confirmed to participate in the Call Your Shot Gauntlet as announced by The Righteous (Vincent and Dutch), whom tried to form an alliance with Hudson, but she declined their offer. The following week, an eight-man tag team match between the team of Kazarian, Miguel, Bronson, and Elijah and the team of Francis, Myers, Home Town Man, and Alonzo was held, where the wrestlers involved in the match's decision would receive the number one and 20 spots in the Call Your Shot Gauntlet. Alonzo earned the number 20 spot by pinning Miguel, who subsequently received the number one entry. On October 9, seven more participants were confirmed via social media: Elayna Black, Gabby Forza, The Elegance Brand (Heather by Elegance, M by Elegance, and Mr. Elegance), and The Righteous (Vincent and Dutch).

For several months, various wrestlers were attacked backstage, including Moose, Cedric Alexander, Elijah, Leon Slater, Ryan Nemeth, and The Hardys (Jeff Hardy and Matt Hardy). Matt was the most recent victim, who had been revealed to have been attacked by two unknown assailants. On the September 24 episode of Impact!, The Hardys called out the unknown assailants, who appeared and attacked them. The assailants then revealed themselves as the returning Samuel Shaw and the debuting Joseph Sawyer (formerly Joe Gacy in WWE); their team name would be revealed as "Syx". The following week, Shaw called TNA a "rotten place" that needed to be cut apart. He said that The Hardys were at the top of the chopping block because they could not be killed. Despite The Hardys surviving their attack, Shaw said that it is fine because they get to attack them again. Sawyer then stated that they will find out how hard The Hardys are to kill. The Hardys then appeared, and Matt proclaimed that they are unkillable. Matt then proposed a match between The Hardys and Syx in a Falls Count Anywhere match at Bound for Glory. The Hardys then tried to attack Syx, but Syx disappeared after the arena lights turned off. On the October 8 episode, The Hardys got their mandatory rematch against The Nemeths (Nic Nemeth and Ryan Nemeth) for the TNA World Tag Team Championship, but The Hardys were unsuccessful after a distraction caused by Syx allowed Nic to pin Jeff. After The Hardys recovered following the match, the lights turned off; when the lights came back on, Syx was in the ring with The Hardys unconscious.

On the October 8 episode of Impact!, TNA Knockouts World Tag Team Champions Allie and Kiera Hogan had a brief physical altercation with Zoey Serrano backstage. Allie and Hogan later announced that they would put their title on the line against Serrano and a partner of Serrano's choosing at Bound for Glory. Later that night, Serrano successfully convinced Shayna Baszler to be her tag team partner; this match would be Baszler's TNA debut.

On the October 8 episode of Impact!, Moose issued an open challenge for a match at Bound for Glory. The challenge was answered a day later by Max Caster, who would make his TNA debut at the event.

== Event ==
| Role | Name |
|---|---|
| Commentators | Tom Hannifan |
| Commentators | Matthew Rehwoldt |
| Ring announcer | McKenzie Mitchell |
| Referees | Daniel Spencer |
| Referees | Frank Gastineau |
| Referees | Mickie James (Brookside vs. Hartwell) |
| Referees | Michael Romo |
| Referees | Paige Prinzivalli |

=== Preliminary matches ===
The event opened with Ricky Sosa versus Eddie Edwards, who was accompanied by Alisha Edwards. As Sosa prepared for an attack, he noticed Alisha on the top rope behind him before she dove onto Sosa, which allowed Sosa to catch her and execute the "Blue Thunder Bang" on Alisha, in which Sosa lifted Alisha up, spun 180°, and then slamming her down back-first. Eddie then hit Sosa with the "Boston Knee Party", in which he struck Sosa's face with his knee. Sosa later avoided a dive by Eddie, and then Sosa retaliated with the "Headshot", in which Sosa ran towards Eddie before using his arm to attack Eddie's chin. Sosa then pinned Eddie to gain the victory. Following the match, Sosa and Eddie shook hands.

The next match was the seven-way scramble for the vacant TNA X Division Championship, featuring Amazing Red, BDE, Cedric Alexander, Fabian Aichner, KC Navarro, Rich Swann, and Ryan Nemeth. Navarro tried to pin Aichner after executing the "Blessing in Disguise", in which Navarro backflipped over Aichner while grabbing Aichner's head to drive Aichner down back-first, but Nemeth pulled the referee out of the ring to void the pinfall attempt. Red later executed the "Code Red" on Navarro, in which Red jumped over Navarro and rolled forward while grabbing Navarro's waist to force Navarro to fall backwards. Red then pinned Navarro to win the vacant title.

In the third match, Allie and Kiera Hogan defended the TNA Knockouts World Tag Team Championship against Zoey Serrano and Shayna Baszler. Late into the match, Serrano neutralized Hogan by striking Hogan with her knee. Allie attacked Serrano, but Baszler struck Allie with her knee. Serrano then delivered Allie to Baszler for another knee strike. Baszler then put Allie in a chokehold to win the match and the title via technical submission.

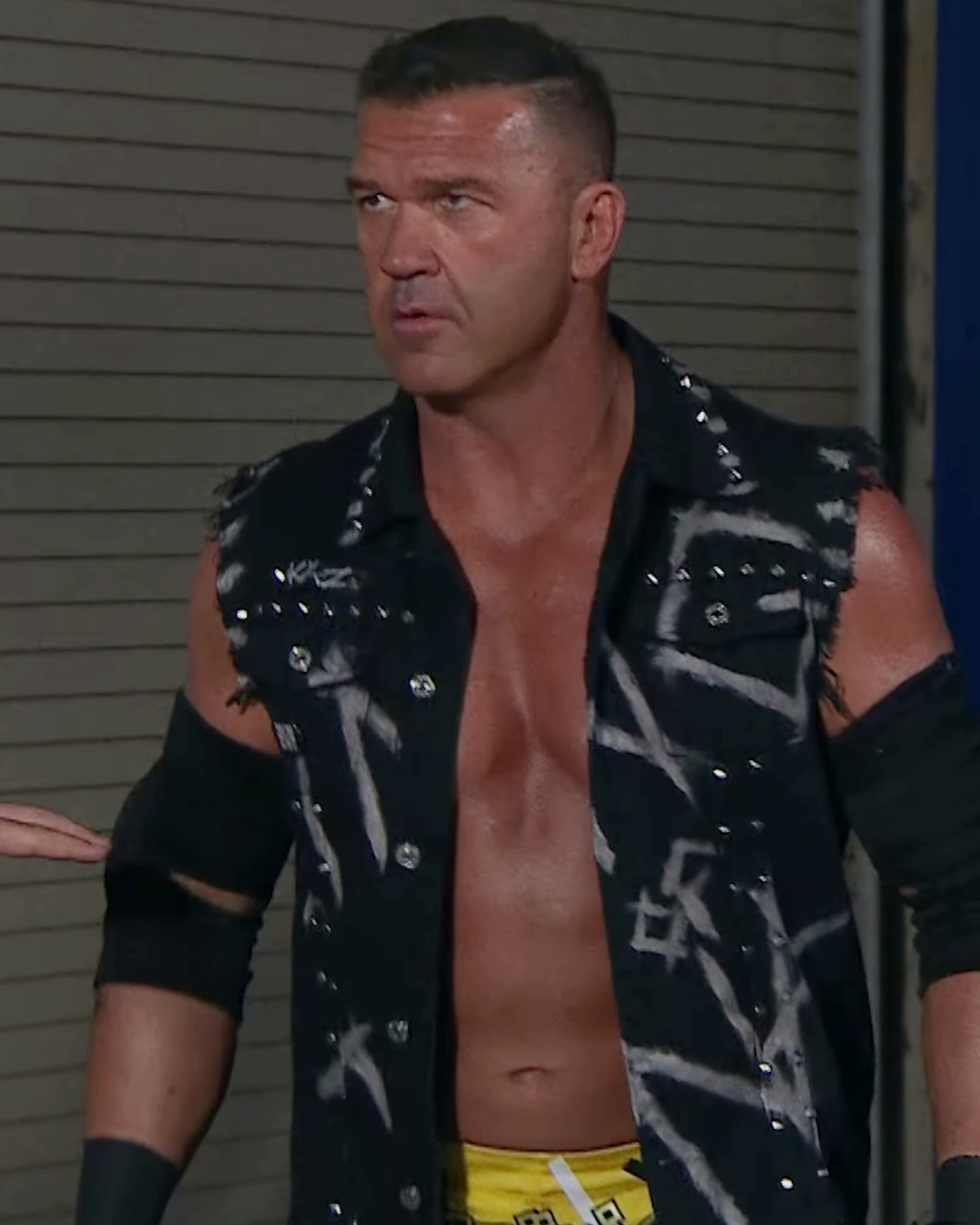
For the third consecutive year, Frankie Kazarian won the Call Your Shot Gauntlet.

Next, Trey Miguel and Avery Styles kicked off the Call Your Shot Gauntlet for a future championship match at any time of the winner's choosing. The match stipulated that wrestlers are eliminated by being thrown over the top rope with both feet touching the floor until two wrestlers remain where the match can only be won via pinfall or submission. The System member Bear Bronson, Frankie Kazarian, The Righteous member Dutch, LJ Cleary, and Gabby Forza were the next entrants. Cleary was the first to get eliminated after getting taken out by Forza. The next entrants were TNA commentator Matthew Rehwoldt and The Elegance Brand member Heather by Elegance, who eliminated Rehwoldt. The next entrants were The Righteous member Vincent, Harley Hudson, A. J. Francis, Elijah, TNA Knockouts Television Champion and The Elegance Brand member M by Elegance, and The Home Town Man. After Dutch was eliminated by Bronson, Bronson tried to eliminated Hudson, but she was saved by Dutch. The System member Brian Myers and The Elegance Brand member Mr. Elegance were the 16th and 17th entrants. Consecutive elimination then followed as Vincent was eliminated by Myers, Heather and Hudson were eliminated by M, and then M was eliminated by M. After Elayna Black entered 18th, Bronson was eliminated by Forza. The penultimate entrant was Jada Stone, but she was attacked by Ben Bishop, who said that he was taking his opportunity that was being denied from him for years. Bishop entered the match, but so too was Stone, who eliminated Bishop. Stone was then eliminated by Myers, who was then eliminated by Home Town Man; Francis then followed by eliminating Home Town Man and Forza. The final entrant was Joe Alonzo, who was quickly eliminated by Styles, who then eliminated Mr. Elegance. Styles tried to eliminate Francis but Francis landed on top of his manager Expressions, saving him from elimination. Francis then eliminated Black, and Kazarian eliminated Elijah. After Francis eliminated Styles and was eliminated by Miguel, the match became a standard singles match between Miguel and Kazarian. In the end, Kazarian pinned Miguel to win his third consecutive Call Your Shot Gauntlet. Kazarian would later announce that he planned to invoke his Call Your Shot title opportunity for the TNA World Tag Team Championship with Styles.

The following match was the The Order 4-Way match for the TNA International Championship between the four male members of the defunct Order 4 stable: defending champion Mustafa Ali, Jason Hotch, John Skyler (accompanied by Mila Moore), and Special Agent 0 (accompanied by Tasha Steelz). The first competitor to pin or submit an opponent would win the match. Ali ordered Hotch and Skyler to place Agent 0 on a table, and they obliged. Steelz tried to interfere, but Moore struck Steelz with her shoe, and Steelz fell on the table with Agent 0. Ali then dove off the top rope onto Agent 0 and Steelz through the table. After working together to take out Ali, Hotch and Skyler mended ties before beginning to fight each other. After recovering, Agent 0 attacked Moore. Agent 0 then brought the steel steps inside the ring, and then Agent 0 slammed into the steel steps before Ali slammed Agent 0's head onto the steel steps. Hotch then followed by jumping over the steel steps and then executing a superplex on Ali, in which Hotch fell backwards as he flipped Ali over him off the top rope. Hotch later dove off the top rope to stomp on Agent 0. Ali then executed a 450° splash on Hotch, in which Ali dove off the top rope while performing a front somersault with 1.5 rotations onto a supine Hotch. Ali then tried pinning Hotch, but after a count of two, Hotch countered by rolling into a pin of his own; Hotch successfully achieved the pinfall victory to win the match and regain the title.

In the sixth match, Xia Brookside defended the TNA Knockouts World Championship against Indi Hartwell with Mickie James serving as the special guest referee. After Brookside exposed a turnbuckle, James confronted Brookside, which Hartwell took advantage of with an attack. Brookside attempted to leave the match, but Hartwell stopped her. Brookside later retaliated by sticking her thumb into Hartwell's eyes. James confronted Brookside, which prompted Brookside to slap James, who then retaliated with a punch towards Brookside. As Hartwell set up an attack, Brookside escaped and shoved Hartwell into the exposed turnbuckle. Brookside then prepared to attack, but Hartwell shoved her into the exposed turnbuckle instead. Hartwell then executed the "Hurts Donut", in which Hartwell lifted Brookside up by Brookside's arms before slamming Brookside sideways face-first, before pinning Brookside to win the title.

The following match was Moose versus the debuting Max Caster. As Moose was on the brink of losing via count out after an attack by Caster at ringside, Caster stopped the referee from ending the match. Moose later countered a top-rope dive by Caster by raising his knees and letting Caster land on his knees. Moose then executed a spear on Caster, in which Moose charged towards Caster and then hitting Caster's midsection with his arm to force Caster to fall backwards, before pinning Caster to win the match.

In the penultimate match, The Hardys (Jeff Hardy and Matt Hardy) battled Syx (Joseph Sawyer and Samuel Shaw) in a Falls Count Anywhere match, where the match could only be won via pinfall or submission in any location. The match began with a brawl on the entrance ramp before the fight was brought into the crowd. Jeff later jumped off a balcony onto Shaw through multiple tables. After The Hardys positioned Syx on tables, Erick Redbeard – known in WWE as "Erick Rowan" and was Shaw and Sawyer's stablemate in the Wyatt Sicks – appeared and attacked The Hardys and executed a powerbomb on them through the tables, in which Redbard positioned The Hardys on his shoulders before slamming them down back-first. Syx and Redbeard then brough The Hardys into the ring, where Shaw executed a powerbomb by slamming Sawyer onto The Hardys. Shaw then pinned Jeff to win the match.

=== Main event ===
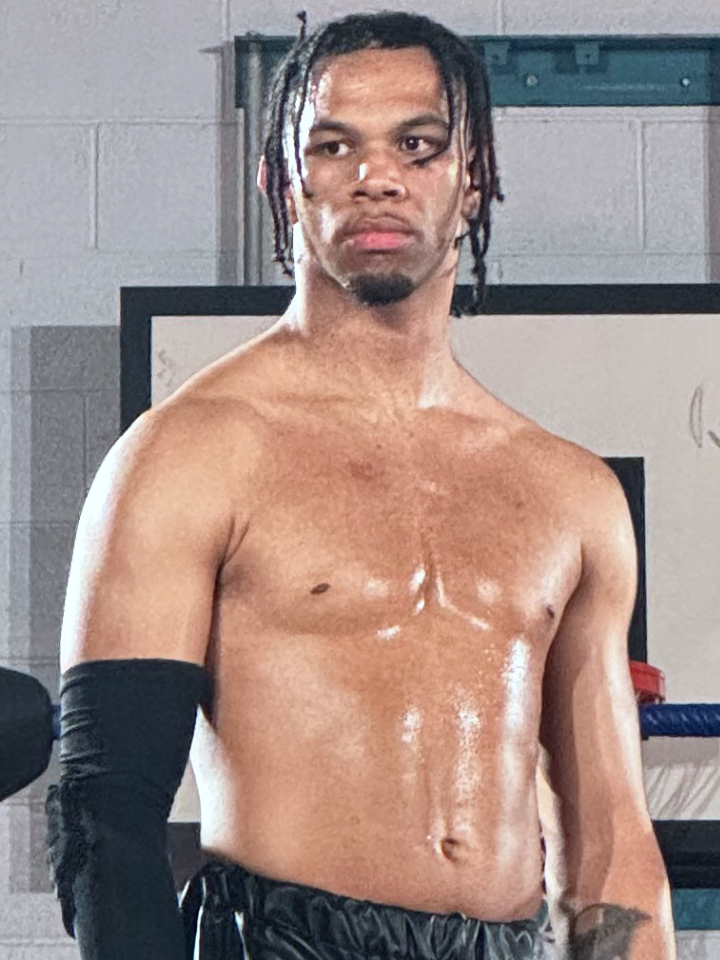
Leon Slater became the youngest TNA World Champion after his title victory at Bound for Glory.

In the main event, TNA World Champion and one-half of the TNA World Tag Team Champions Nic Nemeth defended the TNA World Championship against Leon Slater. As Nemeth arrogantly gloated, Slater took advantage by blindsiding Nemeth. Slater executed a suplex on Nemeth over the top rope, in which Slater fell backwards while flipping Nemeth over him, but Nemeth brought Slater down to the floor with him; as Slater fell over, he hit his head on the top rope. Although Slater initially blocked Nemeth's kick attempt to his head, Nemeth was still able to land the kick, but Slater responded with a kick of his own. Slater attempted a dive onto a supine Nemeth but Nemeth countered by raising his knees as Slater landed on Nemeth's knees instead. Slater later retaliated with a series of dives onto Nemeth, including a Swanton 450° splash, in which Slater outstretched his arms as he performed a 450° splash. Slater then pinned Nemeth to win the match and become the youngest TNA World Champion in history.

== Aftermath ==
Prior to his match at Bound for Glory, Max Caster rapped during his entrance, stating “And it’s the firing squad. I drop bombs. You don’t even have to fly to Riyadh.” The day after Bound for Glory, Fightful Select reported that the aforementioned statements were not scripted and not approved. TNA would later issue a statement, stating that Caster had made “insensitive comments” about the October 2026 attacks on Saudi Arabia airports. TNA subsequently apologized for such comments making it into the event and removed the segment from replays of the event and TNA's social media accounts. TNA then confirmed that Caster no longer worked for TNA. A day later, Caster addressed the controversy, thanking TNA President Carlos Silva and his opponent at Bound for Glory, Moose, and apologizing for letting down the people who helped him get a match at Bound for Glory. Caster said that he could not apologize to anyone who was offended as he never intended to offend people in his raps. He said that he aimed to entertain and felt good that his part of the event became a major talking point. He added that he accepted the consequences of his actions, but he felt embarrassed because of how it transpired. Caster would address the controversy again a few days later at an Awesome Championship Wrestling event, where he apologized to the fans and announced that he would take a hiatus from professional wrestling.

On the October 22 episode of Impact!, Tasha Steelz and Special Agent 0 parted ways as Order 4 had officially ended. Agent 0 would then take on a new ring name, "Zer0". The following week, Mila Moore broke up with John Skyler, calling Skyler a "loser".

== Results ==
| No. | Results | Stipulations | Times |
|---|---|---|---|
| 1 | Ricky Sosa defeated Eddie Edwards (with Alisha Edwards) by pinfall | Singles match | 11:40 |
| 2 | Amazing Red defeated BDE, Cedric Alexander, Fabian Aichner, KC Navarro, Rich Swann, and Ryan Nemeth by pinfall | Seven-way scramble for the vacant TNA X Division Championship | 10:30 |
| 3 | Zoey Serrano and Shayna Baszler defeated Allie and Kiera Hogan (c) by technical submission | Tag team match for the TNA Knockouts World Tag Team Championship | 8:45 |
| 4 | Frankie Kazarian won by last eliminating Trey Miguel | 21-person Call Your Shot Gauntlet for a future championship match | 34:05 |
| 5 | Jason Hotch defeated Mustafa Ali (c), John Skyler (with Mila Moore), and Special Agent 0 (with Tasha Steelz) by pinfall | The Order 4-Way match for the TNA International Championship | 13:15 |
| 6 | Indi Hartwell defeated Xia Brookside (c) by pinfall | Singles match for the TNA Knockouts World Championship; Mickie James served as the special guest referee. | 10:25 |
| 7 | Moose defeated Max Caster by pinfall | Singles match | 10:45 |
| 8 | Syx (Joseph Sawyer and Samuel Shaw) defeated The Hardys (Matt Hardy and Jeff Hardy) by pinfall | Falls Count Anywhere match | 12:40 |
| 9 | Leon Slater defeated Nic Nemeth (c) by pinfall | Singles match for the TNA World Championship; This was Slater's Option C world championship match. | 18:20 |
(c) / – the champion(s) heading into the match

=== TNA X Division Championship Tournament ===
Qualifiers; Thursday Night Impact! August 27 – September 25, 2026 (Aired: September 3 – October 1)
Fabian Aichner | Pinfall
Rohit Raju | 5:41
KC Navarro | Pinfall
Joe Alonzo | 7:40
Cedric Alexander | Bye (Note: Alexander was owed a mandatory rematch after losing the TNA X Division Championship to Leon Slater at Lockdown. When Slater vacated the title to invoke Option C, Alexander used his rematch clause to enter the scramble without needing to qualify.)
N/A | —
Rich Swann | Pinfall
LJ Cleary | 8:05
Ryan Nemeth | Pinfall
KJ Orso | 6:40
Mr. Elegance | 4:30
BDE | Pinfall

Championship match Bound for Glory; October 11, 2026
Fabian Aichner | —
KC Navarro | 10:30
Cedric Alexander | —
Rich Swann | —
Ryan Nemeth | —
BDE | —
Amazing Red (Note: TNA Hall of Famer Amazing Red announced during his induction ceremony that he would compete in the match for the vacant TNA X Division Championship, turning it into a seven-way scramble.) | Pinfall

=== Call Your Shot Gauntlet ===
– Winner

List of entrants and eliminations
| Draw | Entrant | Eliminated by | Order | Eliminations |
|---|---|---|---|---|
| 1 | Trey Miguel (Note: On the October 8, 2026, episode of Thursday Night Impact!, an eight-man tag team match was held where the wrestlers involved in the match's decision would decide the number one and number 20 entrants in the Call Your Shot Gauntlet. Joe Alonzo pinned Trey Miguel to earn the number 20 spot; thus, Miguel will be forced to enter the gauntlet first.) | Frankie Kazarian | 20 | 1 |
| 2 | Avery Styles | A. J. Francis | 18 | 2 |
| 3 | Bear Bronson | Gabby Forza | 8 | 2 |
| 4 | Frankie Kazarian | Winner | | 2 |
| 5 | Dutch | Bear Bronson | 3 | 0 |
| 6 | LJ Cleary | Bear Bronson | 1 | 0 |
| 7 | Gabby Forza | A. J. Francis | 13 | 2 |
| 8 | Matthew Rehwoldt | Heather by Elegance | 2 | 0 |
| 9 | Heather by Elegance | M by Elegance | 5 | 1 |
| 10 | Vincent | Brian Myers | 4 | 0 |
| 11 | Harley Hudson | M by Elegance | 6 | 0 |
| 12 | A. J. Francis | Trey Miguel | 19 | 4 |
| 13 | Elijah | Frankie Kazarian | 17 | 0 |
| 14 | M by Elegance | Gabby Forza | 7 | 2 |
| 15 | The Home Town Man | A. J. Francis | 12 | 1 |
| 16 | Brian Myers | The Home Town Man | 11 | 2 |
| 17 | Mr. Elegance | Avery Styles | 15 | 0 |
| 18 | Elayna Black | A. J. Francis | 16 | 0 |
| 19 | Jada Stone | Brian Myers | 10 | 1 |
| 19 | Ben Bishop | Jada Stone | 9 | 0 |
| 20 | Joe Alonzo | Avery Styles | 14 | 0 |
