= Sebastian Hackl =

German television presenter and professional wrestler

Personal information
- Born: Sebastian Hackl; October 4, 1980 (age 45) Passau, West Germany
- Website: https://www.sebastianhackl.com/

Professional wrestling career
- Ring name(s): Hard Style; Sebastian Sage; Sebastian Hackl
- Billed height: 6 ft 1 in (185 cm)
- Billed weight: 216 lb (98 kg)
- Trained by: Alex Wright
- Debut: 3. October 2009

Sebastian Hackl (born 4 October 1980 in Passau, West Germany) is a German professional wrestler and commentator. His Ring name is Sebastian Sage.

== Career ==
At the age of nine, Hackl developed an interest in wrestling, which led him to become a contract survivor at NEW from 2009 to 2012. In GWP and Westside Xtreme Wrestling (wXw), he appeared as a free agent. On April 15, 2013, he announced the interim end of his in-ring career to focus on commenting. Since 2010 Hackl's been under contract with WWE but competed in matches for WFW, New European Championship Wrestling and Ultimate Kombat Wrestling Association. In December 2010, he won the UKWA Champion title from Maxxberg on Maxima 8. In 2013 he was a commentator for WXW. Currently, he is a member of the German announcer team and can be heard on EuroSport, Sky, ProSieben Maxx and WWE Network. Additionally, he commentates on MMA events on DAZN. In September 2023 he competed in his first match after 10 Years on WXW Shortcut. In 2024 he moderated the TV total Promi Wrestling, where German celebrities fought side by side with wrestlers like Axel Tischer or Cesaro.

== Championships and accomplishments ==
- 1x UKWA Champion
- 1x NEW Hardcore Champion
