= ELH (disambiguation) =

ELH may refer to:

- ELH, a literary academic journal
- Czech Extraliga (Czech: Extraliga ledního hokeje), a Czech ice hockey league
- Eastlake High School (Chula Vista, California), a four-year high school
- El Hugeirat language
- Elh Kmer (born 1995), Cameroon-born French rapper
- Evangelical Lutheran Hymnary
- North Eleuthera Airport, on Eleuthera, Bahamas
