= Ben Bishop (wrestler) =

American professional wrestler (born 1990)

Personal information
- Born: Benjamin Crenca; 10 March 1990 (age 36) Exeter, Rhode Island, U.S.

Professional wrestling career
- Ring name(s): Ben Bishop; Bob Furio; Hurtful Kurt
- Billed height: 6 ft 10 in (2.08 m)
- Billed weight: 257 lb (117 kg)
- Debut: 2020

Benjamin Crenca (born March 10, 1990), better known as Ben Bishop is an American professional wrestler.

== Career ==
Crenshaw began his career in 2020, making his All Elite Wrestling debut in 2021, in a loss to Bear Bronson on AEW Dark. In 2024, he appeared on AEW Rampage, losing to Roderick Strong.

On October 11 2026, Bishop made his debut for TNA at Bound for Glory.

== Championships and accomplishments ==
- Adrenaline Championship Wrestling
  - ACW Heavyweight Championship (1 time)
  - ACW Tag Team Championship (1 time with Michael's Amaydo)
