= Gauntlet for the Gold =

Professional wrestling battle royal

A Gauntlet for the Gold match is a professional wrestling match held in Total Nonstop Action Wrestling (TNA).

== Match format ==
Different from the other gauntlet matches, in which one competitor faces several others in turn, the Gauntlet for the Gold match is very similar to the fellow professional wrestling promotion WWE's Royal Rumble match. It consists of two competitors beginning the match in the ring, followed by competitors entering the ring at timed intervals. Elimination is in the standard battle royal format in which a competitor must go over the top rope and hit the floor in order to be eliminated. If a wrestler falls to the floor without going over the top rope or is thrown over the top but does not fall to the floor, the competitor may re-enter the ring and continue the match.

The final portion of the match consists of the last two competitors squaring off in a regular singles match in which victory must be attained by pinfall or submission.

The Gauntlet for the Gold usually involves a double digit number of wrestlers, and the prize is usually either a championship or a championship match opportunity.

== Variations ==
There is a tag team variation of the Gauntlet for the Gold. A single wrestler enters one at a time at predetermined intervals. When all but two competitors are eliminated, the partners of the two survivors return and the match becomes a standard tag team match.

On October 23, 2005, at the Bound for Glory pay-per-view, the Gauntlet for the Gold Match was fought as completely elimination-only, since the winner had to immediately face the NWA World Heavyweight Champion for the title.

There was also an Ultimate X Gauntlet at Victory Road in 2007, with over-the-top-rope rules and after all 10 participants entered the match, it became a standard Ultimate X match, with the remaining entrants in the match competing in it.

=== Call Your Shot ===
In 2019, a modified version of the match - called the Call Your Shot Gauntlet - was introduced. While continuing to use the same rules and format as before, the Call Your Shot version is open to both men and women. The Call Your Shot winner receives a trophy, and earns a future championship match (for the title, and at the time, of their choosing) with the stipulation of having one year to invoke their championship match privilege (which is done by handing in the trophy to an official - similar to WWE's Money in the Bank briefcase).

Since then, the Call Your Shot Gauntlet has become an annual tradition at Bound for Glory, which is TNA's biggest show of the year.

== Match history ==
=== Gauntlet for the Gold / Bound for Gold ===
#	Winner	Times won	Prize	Event	Air date	Location	Ref.
1	Ken Shamrock	1	NWA World Heavyweight Championship	NWA Total Nonstop Action	June 19, 2002	Huntsville, AL	
2	America's Most Wanted (Chris Harris and James Storm)	1	NWA World Tag Team Championship	NWA Total Nonstop Action	September 18, 2002	Nashville, TN	
3	Raven	1	Future NWA World Heavyweight Championship match	NWA Total Nonstop Action	August 20, 2003	Nashville, TN	
4	3Live Kru (B.G. James and Ron Killings)	1	Future NWA World Tag Team Championship match	NWA Total Nonstop Action	November 12, 2003	Nashville, TN	
5	Jeff Jarrett	1	NWA World Heavyweight Championship	NWA Total Nonstop Action	July 7, 2004	Nashville, TN	
6	Petey Williams	1	TNA X Division Championship	NWA Total Nonstop Action	August 11, 2004	Nashville, TN	
7	Abyss	1	Future NWA World Heavyweight Championship match	Hard Justice	May 15, 2005	Orlando, FL	
8	Rhino	1	Future NWA World Heavyweight Championship match	Bound for Glory	October 23, 2005	Orlando, FL	
9	Samoa Joe	1	Future TNA World Heavyweight Championship	Impact!	February 15, 2007 (Taped on February 12)	Orlando, FL	
10	A.J. Styles and Tomko	1	Future TNA World Tag Team Championship match	No Surrender	September 9, 2007	Orlando, FL	
11	Gail Kim	1	TNA Women's Knockout Championship	Bound for Glory	October 14, 2007	Duluth, GA	
12	The Motor City Machine Guns (Alex Shelley and Chris Sabin)	1	Future TNA World Tag Team Championship match	Impact!	January 3, 2008	Orlando, FL	
13	ODB	1	Future TNA Women's Knockout Championship match	Impact!	January 3, 2008	Orlando, FL	
14	Petey Williams	2	Future TNA X Division Championship match	Impact!	January 3, 2008	Orlando, FL	
15	Christian Cage	1	Future TNA World Heavyweight Championship match	Impact!	January 3, 2008	Orlando, FL	
16	Sojournor Bolt	1	Future TNA Women's Knockout Championship match	Impact!	February 12, 2009	Orlando, FL	
17	Tyrus	1	Future TNA World Heavyweight Championship match	Bound for Glory	October 4, 2015	Concord, NC	
18	Awesome Kong	1	Future TNA Knockouts Championship match	One Night Only: Live	January 8, 2016	Bethlehem, PA	
19	Gail Kim	2	Future TNA Knockouts Championship match	Impact!	September 15, 2016	Orlando, FL	
20	Eli Drake	1	Future TNA World Heavyweight Championship match	Bound for Glory	October 2, 2016	Orlando, FL	
21	ODB	2	Future Impact Wrestling Knockouts Championship match	Impact Wrestling	April 6, 2017	Orlando, FL	
22	Eli Drake	2	Vacant GFW Global Championship	Impact Wrestling	August 24, 2017	Orlando, FL	
23	Kylie Rae	1	Future Impact Knockouts Championship match	Slammiversary	July 18, 2020	Nashville, TN	
24	Eric Young	1	Future Impact World Championship match	Impact!	May 12, 2022 (Taped on May 8)	Newport, KY	

==== Championship opportunity ====
Won title
Championship or cash-in match ended in a draw
Failed to win title
Did not receive title match

#	Gauntlet Winner	Championship	Event	Date	Location	Results	Ref.
1	Raven	NWA World Heavyweight Championship	NWA Total Nonstop Action	August 27, 2003	Nashville, TN	Lost to AJ Styles.	
2	3 Live Kru (B.G. James and Ron Killings)	NWA World Tag Team Championship	NWA Total Nonstop Action	November 19, 2003	Nashville, TN	Their match against Johnny Swinger and Simon Diamond ended in a draw after Killings and Swinger simultaneously pinned each other. Thus, the titles were vacated.	
3	Abyss	NWA World Heavyweight Championship	Slammiversary	June 19, 2005	Orlando, FL	Lost to Raven in a King of the Mountain match, also involving defending champion AJ Styles, Monty Brown, and Sean Waltman.	
4	Rhino	NWA World Heavyweight Championship	Bound for Glory	October 23, 2005	Orlando, FL	Defeated Jeff Jarrett immediately after winning the Gauntlet.	
5	Samoa Joe	TNA World Heavyweight Championship	Destination X	March 11, 2007	Orlando, FL	Lost to Christian Cage.	
6	AJ Styles and Tomko	TNA World Tag Team Championship	Bound for Glory	October 14, 2007	Duluth, GA	Defeated Ron Killings and Consequences Creed. Creed defended the title on behalf of Adam "Pacman" Jones.	
7	Christian Cage	TNA World Heavyweight Championship	Final Resolution	January 6, 2008	Orlando, FL	Lost to Kurt Angle.	
8	Motor City Machine Guns (Alex Shelley and Chris Sabin)	TNA World Tag Team Championship	Impact!	January 24, 2008 (Taped on January 21)	Orlando, FL	Lost to AJ Styles and Tomko in a three-way tag team match, also involving Team 3D (Brother Devon and Brother Ray).	
9	ODB	TNA Women's Knockout Championship	Against All Odds	February 10, 2008	Greenville, SC	Lost to Awesome Kong.	
10	Petey Williams	TNA X Division Championship	Destination X	March 9, 2008	Norfolk, VA	Lost to Jay Lethal.	
11	Sojournor Bolt	TNA Women's Knockout Championship	Destination X	March 15, 2009	Orlando, FL	Lost to Awesome Kong.	
12	Awesome Kong	TNA Knockouts Championship	Impact Wrestling	January 19, 2016 (Taped on January 8)	Bethlehem, PA	Lost to Gail Kim.	
13	Tyrus	TNA World Heavyweight Championship	Sacrifice	April 26, 2016 (Taped on March 19)	Orlando, FL	Lost to Drew Galloway.	
14	Gail Kim	TNA Knockouts Championship	Bound for Glory	October 2, 2016	Orlando, FL	Defeated Maria Kanellis-Bennett.	
15	Eli Drake	TNA World Heavyweight Championship	Impact Wrestling	November 10, 2016 (Taped on October 8)	Orlando, FL	Lost to Eddie Edwards.	
16	ODB	Impact Wrestling Knockouts Championship	Impact Wrestling	April 20, 2017	Orlando, FL	Lost to Rosemary.	
17	Kylie Rae	Impact Knockouts Championship	—N/a	—N/a	—N/a	Rae was slated to challenge Deonna Purrazzo at Bound for Glory in 2020. However, Rae did not appear at the event. Two weeks later, she temporarily retired from professional wrestling due to mental health issues.	
18	Eric Young	Impact World Championship	Slammiversary	June 19, 2022	Nashville, TN	Lost to Josh Alexander.	

=== Call Your Shot Gauntlet ===
#	Winner	Times won	Prize	Event	Air date	Location	Ref.
1	Eddie Edwards	1	Future championship match of the winner's choosing	Bound for Glory	October 20, 2019	Villa Park, IL	
2	Rhyno	1	Future championship match of the winner's choosing	Bound for Glory	October 24, 2020	Nashville, TN	
3	Moose	1	Future championship match of the winner's choosing	Bound for Glory	October 23, 2021	Sunrise Manor, NV	
4	Bully Ray	1	Future championship match of the winner's choosing	Bound for Glory	October 7, 2022	Albany, NY	
5	Jordynne Grace	1	Future championship match of the winner's choosing	Bound for Glory	October 21, 2023	Cicero, IL	
6	Frankie Kazarian	1	Future championship match of the winner's choosing	Bound for Glory	October 26, 2024	Detroit, MI	
7	Frankie Kazarian	2	Future championship match of the winner's choosing	Bound for Glory	October 12, 2025	Lowell, MA	
7	Nic Nemeth	1	Future championship match of the winner's choosing	Bound for Glory	October 12, 2025	Lowell, MA	
8	Frankie Kazarian	3	Future championship match of the winner's choosing	Bound for Glory	October 11, 2026	Tampa, FL	

==== Championship opportunity ====
Won title
Failed to win title

#	Gauntlet winner	Championship	Event	Date	Location	Result	Ref.
1	Eddie Edwards	Vacant Impact World Championship	Slammiversary	July 18, 2020	Nashville, TN	Defeated Ace Austin, Eric Young, Rich Swann and Trey in a Five-way elimination match.	
2	Rhino	Impact World Tag Team Championship	Impact!	May 20, 2021	Nashville, TN	Violent by Design (Rhino and Joe Doering) defeated FinJuice (David Finlay and Juice Robinson) immediately after FinJuice retained the titles.	
3	Moose	Impact World Championship	Bound for Glory	October 23, 2021	Sunrise Manor, NV	Defeated Josh Alexander immediately after Alexander won the title.	
4	Bully Ray	Impact World Championship	Hard To Kill	January 13, 2023	Atlanta, GA	Lost to Josh Alexander.	
5	Jordynne Grace	TNA Knockouts World Championship	Hard To Kill	January 13, 2024	Paradise, NV	Defeated Trinity.	
6	Frankie Kazarian	TNA World Championship	Rebellion	April 27, 2025	Los Angeles, CA	Lost to Joe Hendry in a three-way match, also involving Ethan Page.	
7	Frankie Kazarian	TNA World Championship	Impact!	November 13, 2025	Orlando, FL	Defeated Mike Santana immediately after Santana was attacked by WWE NXT wrestlers.	
8	Nic Nemeth	TNA World Championship	Slammiversary	June 28, 2026	Boston, MA	Defeated Mike Santana.	
!9	Frankie Kazarian	TNA World Tag Team Championship	TBA	—N/a	—N/a	Kazarian will invoke his title opportunity with Avery Styles.	
