= Avery Styles =

American professional wrestler (born 2007)

Personal information
- Born: Avery Jones; February 14, 2007 (age 19) Gainesville, Georgia, U.S.
- Relative: AJ Styles (father)

Professional wrestling career
- Ring name: Avery Styles
- Billed from: Gainesville, Georgia
- Trained by: AJ Styles; Dungeon 2.0; Natalya Neidhart; TJ Wilson
- Debut: June 26, 2026

Avery Jones (born February 14, 2007) is an American professional wrestler. He is signed to Total Nonstop Action Wrestling (TNA), where he performs under the ring name Avery Styles. He is a second-generation wrestler, being the son of WWE Hall of Famer AJ Styles.

== Professional wrestling career ==
=== Independent circuit (2026–present) ===
On June 26, 2026, Jones made his debut under the ring name Avery Styles during Squared Circle Action's Freedom Fling event in Royston, Georgia, where he defeated Ashton Martin in the main event. On July 31, Styles made his Game Changer Wrestling (GCW) debut at Top Play in Omaha, Nebraska, defeating Alexander Lev.

==== Reception ====
After his match with GCW, on August 8, WWE wrestler Natalya Neidhart said in an interview that Jones was "paying his dues". However, F1RST Wrestling owner Arik Cannon, who worked on the event, accused him of "skirting responsibility". AJ Styles responded to Cannon's accusations, claiming that he was paid to wrestle and not to set up the ring. On August 11, GCW owner Brett Lauderdale defended Styles by claiming that Jones had "earned his spot" despite his rookie status in the industry. On TMZ's Inside The Ring podcast, former WWE wrestler and All Elite Wrestling (AEW) commentator Paul Wight responded to the scandal, claiming that "paying the dues existed as a way for veterans to bully and intimidate younger talent".

=== Total Nonstop Action Wrestling (2026–present) ===
On August 23, 2026, Styles made his Total Nonstop Action Wrestling (TNA) debut at the Lockdown pay-per-view, where he announced that he had signed a contract with the promotion. Styles made his in-ring debut for TNA at Bound for Glory on October 11 as the second entrant in the Call Your Shot Gauntlet, which was won by Frankie Kazarian.
