= New European Championship Wrestling =

German professional wrestling promotion

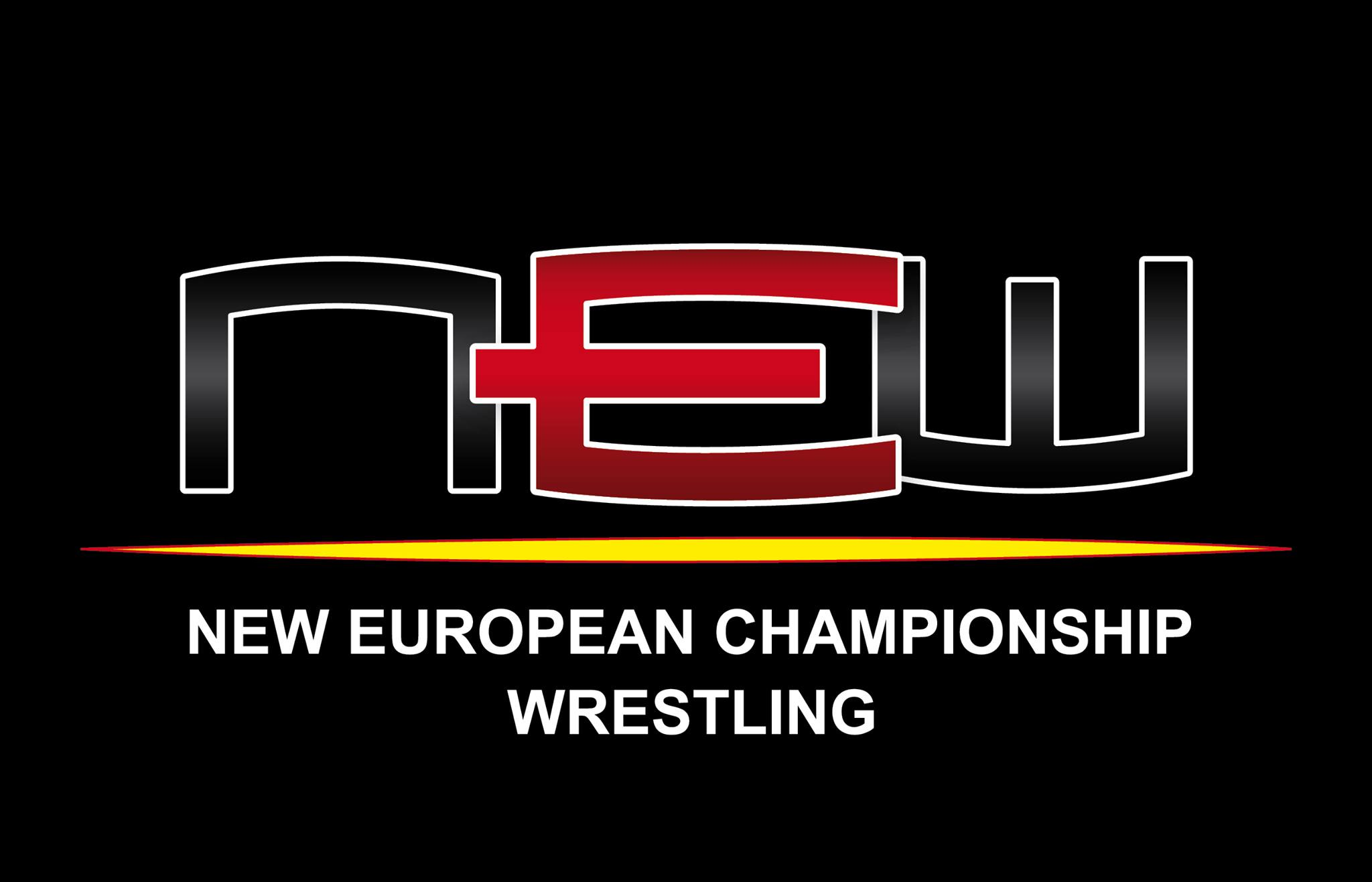
- Acronym: NECW
- Founded: 2009
- Style: Professional wrestling
- Headquarters: Heßdorf
- Founder(s): Alex Wright
- Owner(s): Alex Wright

New European Championship Wrestling (NEW) is a wrestling promotion which was founded in Germany in 2009. It resides in the Franconian village of Heßdorf near Erlangen. Founded by Alex Wright, a well-known successful international wrestler himself and owner of the wrestling training centre "The Wright Stuff - Pro Wrestling School", NEW is the only league in Germany with its own sports and training hall, called N.E.W. HotSpot. It is specially equipped for all different kind of matches. NEW events take place on a monthly basis, each with a different topic or match stipulations.

== History ==
In 2009 NEW was founded by Alex Wright, former WCW World Cruiserweight Champion, WCW World TV Champion and WCW World Tag Team Champion. NEW is a professional platform for trainees of his training center "The Wright Stuff", rookies as well as internationally experienced and established wrestlers. The first professional event was "Hoch Explosiv" on 3 October 2009, and it was sold out with around 500 spectators. Most of the events have recurring topics and names like Hoch Explosiv, EXTREME, Deadline, etc. The monthly events take place in the hall NEW HotSpot. As of December 2019, there are no events scheduled in the HotSpot anymore, a tour is being planned. The NEW regularly records their events and broadcasts them on Vimeo on-demand, YouTube, live from the hall, and publishes them on DVD. Since 3 June 2016, the NEW shows are also broadcast on TV FightBox.

== The Wright Stuff - Pro Wrestling School ==
Alex Wright, second generation wrestler, founded the training centre "The Wright Stuff" - Pro Wrestling School in 2007. Many of his trainees had their in ring debut in the NEW and now compete on regular basis in other international leagues, like Adrian Severe who wrestled in WWE under the name Giovanni Vinci. Others are Hakeem Wakuur, Juvenile X, T-K-O and V.I.P. The training centre "The Wright Stuff" is known for regular training, high-impact seminars at weekends and special training sessions in singles session and group-training. The wrestling school offers 2 wrestling rings.

== The N.E.W. HotSpot ==
NEW HotSpot is the name of the NEW training center in Heßdorf/Germany. Since 2011 this is the only wrestling hall in Germany specially equipped for wrestling, following the ideas of wrestler Alex Wright. Everything is adapted for training and event purpose, like the light design, entrance ramp, video display panel, two wrestling rings, and gastronomy. Also, a steel cage (13 feet) can be built on top of the ring canvas for the events. Both, training and NEW shows, take place in the NEW HotSpot. As of December 2019, there are no events scheduled in the HotSpot anymore, a tour is being planned.

== Cooperation with TV channels ==
NEW is broadcast via Fightbox internationally in five continents and 23 countries. Fightbox is a TV specialist in martial arts. Since 3 June 2016 the NEW is part of the Sport&Action package. The English commentator is Don Roid.

Since the beginning of 2017, NEW announced a cooperation with the American video streaming service for ring sports live programming FITE TV, and with the German live streaming channel Rocket Beans TV. The second to last show is shown monthly on Rocket Beans TV. The German commentators are currently Milosz Sudnik and Tobias Kühnlein.

NEW events since 2016 can be watched for free on the FITE TV app.

== See also ==
- List of professional wrestling promotions in Europe
