= Elh Kmer =

French rapper (born 1995)

Alhadji Garba, known as Elh Kmer (born 12 November 1995) is a Cameroonian-born French rapper based in Boulogne-Billancourt, France.

== Life ==
He is the youngest of a family of 5 kids and was born in Yaounde, Cameroon. Elh Kmer arrived in France to run from misery in Africa and live the African dream. He arrived in France at the age of 11 years, where he developed passion for football and rap, in which he developed a strong passion and affinity very young.

== Description ==
People describe him to be curious, and interested by all music types, indeed of that he stopped school very prematurely. As he didn't find himself in the educational system he rapidly developed his rapper skills.

Rap quickly became what he was made for, and he spent all his time in school writing texts at the age of 14. Ambitious Elh Kmer wanted to develop his rapper skills.

At the age of 17, Mr Sosa (nickname) decided to start his career as a rapper with his childhood best friends fs Braki and Vesti .

== Career ==
Elh kmer was at the origin of the group SDHS (Soldat des Hauts de Seine) with which he released the titles, Soldats Certifiés, Soldats Paré, Los ratos and Gangsta.

He gained recognition when his group 40000 Gang signed under Capitol Music France when he released a single " SOSA" with more than 6.8 million views on YouTube. 40000 Gang released a mixtape in June 2015 called " Anarchie " on which he sang on 5 song namely Mula, Lamborghini, Free Og, Heure du Crime, and Les meilleurs featuring Booba.

== Label ==
After resigning from Capitol records France, he created his own Label Ombre et Lumière, under which he released his first single as independent Sarajevo with two other freestyles de l’ombre #Audi et #2016Followme.

Ombre et lumiere now consist of Elh Kmer, Vesti, and Braki.

== Clothing brand ==
After separating from the group he created his own clothing brand known as "MR SOSA". Currently he is developing a website for his label and brand which will be available very soon.
