= Giovanni Vinci =

Italian professional wrestler (born 1990)

Fabian Aichner
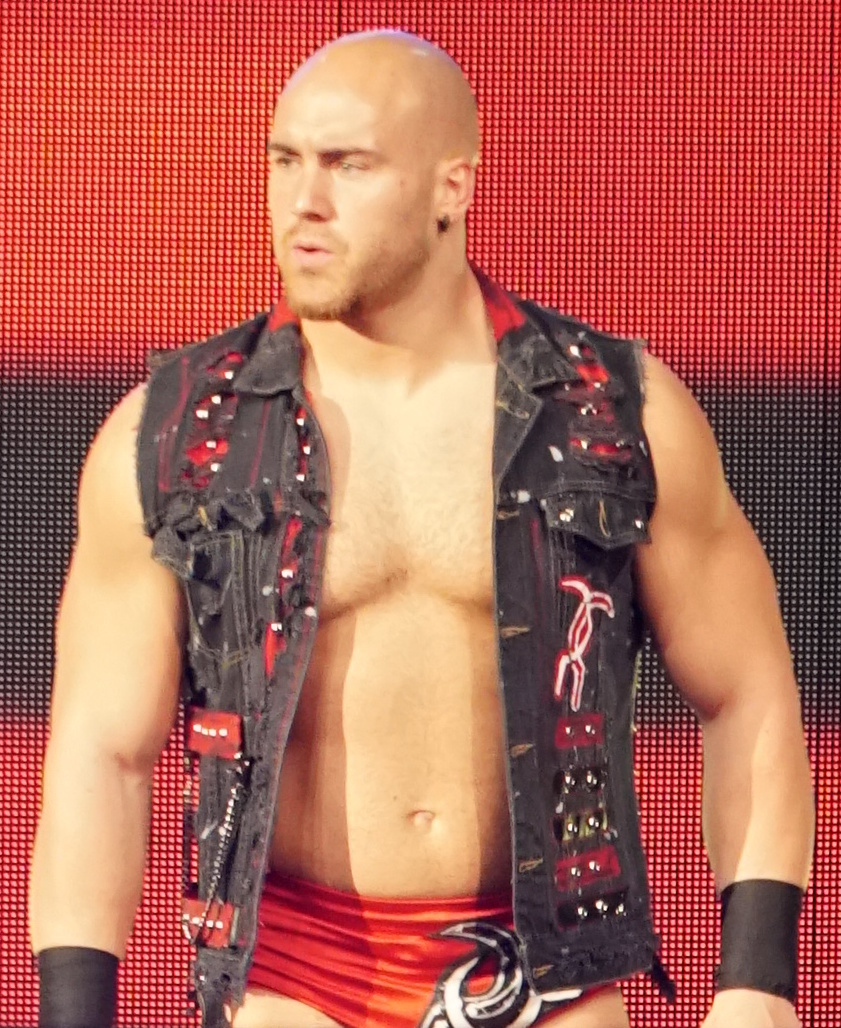
- Aichner in 2018

Personal information
- Born: Fabian Aichner; 21 July 1990 (age 35) Pfalzen, Italy

Professional wrestling career
- Ring name(s): Adrian Severe; Fabian Aichner; Giovanni Vinci
- Billed height: 6 ft 0 in (183 cm)
- Billed weight: 220 lb (100 kg)
- Billed from: South Tyrol, Italy
- Trained by: Alex Wright; WWE Performance Center
- Debut: 9 December 2011

Fabian Aichner (born 21 July 1990) is an Italian professional wrestler. He is signed to Total Nonstop Action Wrestling (TNA), where he performs under his real name. He is best known for his tenure in WWE from 2017 to 2025, where he performed under his real name and then, under the ring name Giovanni Vinci.

Aichner signed with WWE in 2017 and joined the stable Imperium, becoming a two-time NXT Tag Team Champion with Imperium teammate Ludwig Kaiser. He previously worked on the independent circuit, becoming a one-time Evolve Champion. After exiting the stable in April 2022, Aichner was repackaged as a wealthy, vain Italian model named Giovanni Vinci. In September, he rejoined Imperium at the 2022 Clash at the Castle, and would team up with Kaiser. In April 2024, Kaiser attacked Vinci, effectively kicking him out of the group. After this, Vinci returned to singles competition, where he would wrestle briefly before his release in February 2025.

== Early life ==
Fabian Aichner was born on 21 July 1990 in Pfalzen, Italy.

== Professional wrestling career ==
=== Early career (2011–2017) ===
On 9 December 2011, Aichner made his professional wrestling debut under the ring name "Adrian Severe" at a New European Championship Wrestling (NEW) event. He competed in the final of the NEW World Heavyweight Championship tournament in March 2012, but did not win. On 2 February 2013, he won the NEW World Heavyweight Championship by defeating Vicious Impact Power, but lost it back to Power on 2 November. In 2014, he won the King of the North tournament. At the end of the year, Cagematch ranked him at No. 5 for the Euro-Match des Jahres Cagematch Year End Awards. After his return to the independent circuit following his participation in WWE's Cruiserweight Classic in 2016, he won the NEW World Tag Team Championship tournament with Mexx. In 2017, he competed for the German Wrestling Federation (GWF) and Belgium's Flemish Wrestling Force (FWF).

=== World Wrestling Entertainment / WWE (2017–2025) ===
In June 2016, WWE announced Aichner as one of the 32 participants in the Cruiserweight Classic tournament. He was selected to represent Italy during the tournament, and was eliminated by the United Kingdom's Jack Gallagher in the first round. On 5 June 2017, it was announced that he had signed a contract with WWE. He made his television debut on 27 September episode of NXT, losing to Kassius Ohno. While still under contract with WWE, he made an appearance at Evolve 115 (which has a partnership with WWE) and won the Evolve Championship from Shane Strickland. At Evolve 116, he successfully defended the title against Kassius Ohno, but he lost it to Austin Theory at Evolve 117.

Returning to WWE in September 2017, Aichner formed a team with Marcel Barthel, going on to compete on both the NXT and NXT UK brands. They would later align themselves with Walter and Alexander Wolfe in May 2019, forming the team Imperium. On 13 May 2020, Barthel and Aichner defeated Matt Riddle and Timothy Thatcher (the latter substituting for Pete Dunne) to win the NXT Tag Team Championship. They successfully defended against teams such as Oney Lorcan and Danny Burch, Breezango (Tyler Breeze and Fandango), and The Undisputed Era. They lost the championship to Breezango on the August 26 episode of NXT, ending their reign at 105 days. They failed to regain the titles from Breezango in a rematch on the September 16 episode of NXT. On 26 October 2021, at Halloween Havoc, Barthel and Aichner captured the championship for a second time by defeating MSK, and would successfully defend their titles at WarGames against Kyle O'Reilly and Von Wagner. At NXT Stand & Deliver in April 2022, Aichner and Barthel lost the titles back to MSK in a triple threat tag team match also involving The Creed Brothers, ending their reign at 158 days. Aichner's final appearance as a member of Imperium was on the April 5 episode of NXT, when he and Barthel faced The Creed Brothers in a losing effort. Aichner then walked out on Barthel, and Imperium would later debut on the SmackDown brand without Aichner.

On the 24 May episode of NXT, vignettes aired promoting the debut of Aichner's new onscreen character, a wealthy Italian snob named Giovanni Vinci whose catchphrase was "Veni, Vidi, Vinci". He re-debuted on the 14 June episode of NXT, defeating Guru Raaj. On the 16 August episode of NXT: Heatwave, he unsuccessfully challenged Carmelo Hayes for the NXT North American Championship. On 3 September, at Clash at the Castle, he reunited with Walter (now called Gunther) and Barthel (now called Ludwig Kaiser) in Imperium. Imperium were drafted to the Raw brand in the 2023 WWE Draft. On 22 April 2024 episode of Raw, after Kaiser and Vinci lost to The New Day, Kaiser attacked Vinci and kicked him out of Imperium. A week later at Night 2 of the 2024 WWE Draft, Vinci was drafted to the SmackDown brand in the supplemental draft. On the 9 August edition of SmackDown, a vignette aired for Vinci's return to the brand, reverting to his singles character from NXT 2.0 back in 2022. On 6 September, Vinci wrestled his return match for the brand on the last SmackDown on FOX, losing to Apollo Crews in three seconds. Two weeks later, Vinci again lost to Crews and attacked Crews after the match in what was his final televised appearance. After months of inactivity, on February 8, 2025, Vinci was released from WWE, ending his eight-year tenure with the company, with the 90-day no compete clause to expire on 8 May. According to Dave Meltzer, it was reported that Vinci was to be repackaged into a rich playboy character prior to his departure, but nothing ever came into fruition.

=== Total Nonstop Action Wrestling / TNA (2026–present) ===
On the May 14, 2026, episode of Thursday Night Impact!, Aichner made his Total Nonstop Action Wrestling (TNA) debut shortly after Cedric Alexander dethroned Leon Slater for the TNA X Division Championship. introducing himself as a face.

== Other media ==
Aichner appeared as a playable character in video game WWE 2K22. He later appeared as Giovanni Vinci in WWE 2K23, WWE 2K24, and WWE 2K25.

== Championships and accomplishments ==
- Championship of Wrestling
  - cOw Interstate Championship (1 time)
- Dansk Pro Wrestling
  - King Of The North Tournament (2014)
- Evolve
  - Evolve Championship (1 time)
- New European Championship Wrestling
  - NEW Hardcore Championship (1 time)
  - NEW World Heavyweight Championship (2 times)
  - NEW World Tag Team Championship (1 time) – with Mexx
- Power of Wrestling
  - POW Tag Team Championship (1 time) – with James Mason
- Pro Wrestling Illustrated
  - Ranked No. 238 of the top 500 singles wrestlers in the PWI 500 in 2020
- WWE
  - NXT Tag Team Championship (2 times) – with Marcel Barthel
