= Burton Cummings Theatre =

Theatre in Manitoba, Canada

Coordinates: 49°53′45″N 97°8′37″W

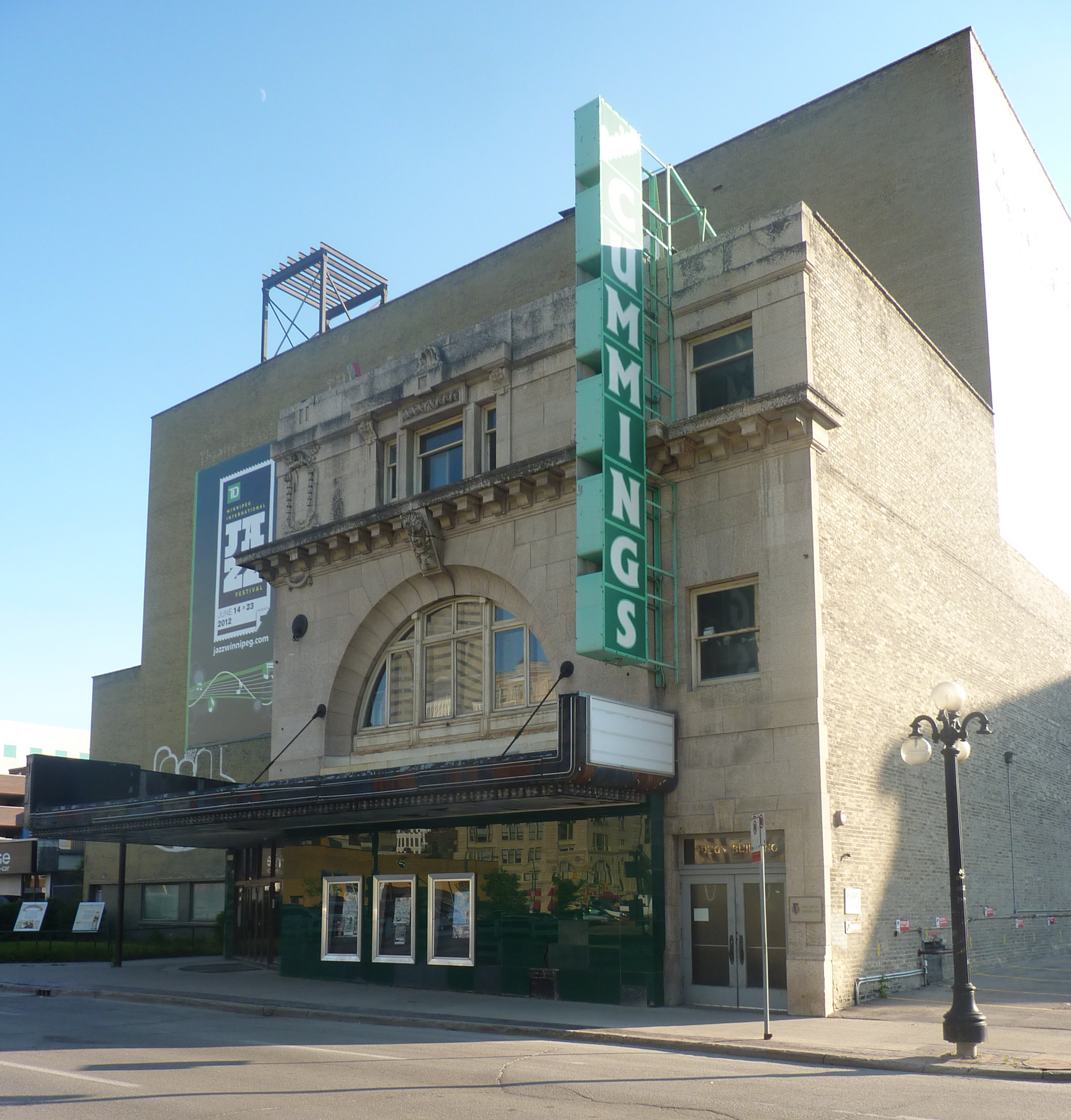
- Burton Cummings Theatre
- Interactive map of Burton Cummings Theatre
- Full name: Burton Cummings Theatre for the Performing Arts
- Former names: Walker Theatre (1907–33); (1991–2002); Odeon Theatre (1945–91)
- Address: 364 Smith St; Winnipeg, MB R3B 2H2
- Location: Central Park
- Owner: True North
- Capacity: 1,638
- Public transit: Winnipeg Transit; F5 F8 D12 D13

Construction
- Opened: February 18, 1907
- Renovated: 1945; 1990–91; 2009–10
- Closed: 1933–45
- Reopened: November 3, 1945; March 1, 1991
- Architect: Howard Colton Stone

Website
- Venue Website

National Historic Site of Canada
- Official name: Walker Theatre National Historic Site of Canada
- Designated: 1991

The Burton Cummings Theatre is a theatre located in Winnipeg, Manitoba, Canada. Built by local impresario Corliss Powers Walker, it was originally known as the Walker Theatre. The building was renamed after singer-songwriter and Winnipeg native Burton Cummings in 2002.

== History ==
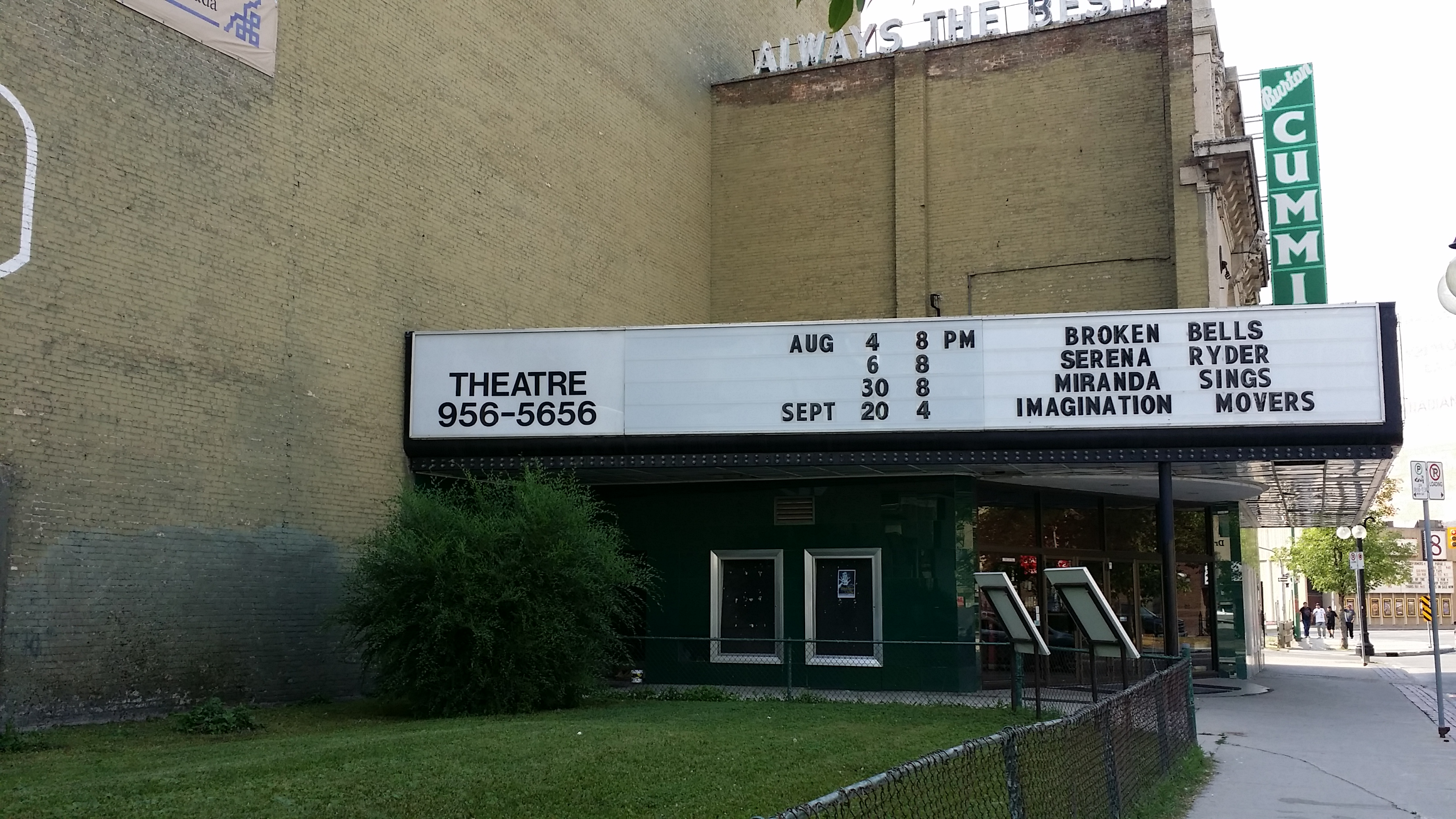
Marquee of the theatre in 2014

Walker owned a number of South Dakota theatres along the Northern Pacific Railway route, which terminated at Winnipeg. Walker allied himself with a New York theatrical syndicate run by a Broadway firm called Klaw and Erlanger. The positioning of Walker's chain of theatres along the railway route helped bring big Broadway shows, and the chain was known as the Red River Valley Theatre Circuit.

Lots for the theatre were purchased in July 1905. The theatre was constructed in 1906–07, and might have opened in December 1906 if there had not been a labour strike. The Walker Theatre had a grand opening on February 18, 1907, featuring Puccini's Madame Butterfly. The theatre was designed by Montreal architect Howard C. Stone who was instructed to design a fireproof theatre following the principles of Chicago's Auditorium theatre. The theatre was originally planned as part of a hotel/office/retail complex, but of the plans, only the Walker Theatre was completed. This is why the external walls are plain, as the original plans called for other attached buildings to all but the front of the theatre. The initial construction of the theatre cost CA$250,000 (1906) (equivalent to CA$8.37 million in 2025).

The building's auditorium, lobby and lounges were decorated with Italian marble, plasterwork, gilt trim, velvet carpets, silk tapestries, murals and crystal chandeliers. The auditorium seated 1,798 people. The interior features vaulted ceilings, reaching a maximum of 60 feet (18 m) in height, huge sidewall arches, 2 curving balconies, a fly tower and broad wings. The top balcony was built for inexpensive ticket holders: it was steeply raked and furnished with wooden pew-like benches. The seat prices in the theatre ranged from 25 cents for seats in the balcony, up to $2.00 for seats in the orchestra. The two balconies were built without support posts or pillars, which allowed upper-level seats a clear view of the stage. The stage area was nearly 25 metres (82 ft) wide, 12 metres (39 ft) deep, and 21 metres (69 ft) high. Behind the stage was a 3-story block with hand elevator dedicated to dressing rooms, property rooms and scenery dock.

The theatre was built to be fireproof on account of the disastrous theatre fires in North America during that period, Walker having been impressed by the 1903 Iroquois Theatre fire. Fireproofing features included a steel cage system, many structural members being encased in concrete or terracotta, concrete floors (covered with fire-resistant wool carpet), fire-retarding metal doors between spaces, brick and terracotta firewalls, and slate-covered metal stairways. Walker claimed it to be the first fireproof theatre in Canada.

The first performance in the theatre was performed before the grand opening, by Pollard's Lilliputian Opera Company on December 17, 1906, before the building had even reached completion. The building was used for live theatrical performances until 1933. It was also used during this period for political rallies, including the labour and women's suffrage movements such as debates and a mock parliament that Nellie McClung took part in. The theatre was host to a 1918 political meeting of the Winnipeg Trades and Labour Council and the Socialist Party of Canada that led to the Winnipeg General Strike.

In 1933, the theatre closed on account of the Great Depression, and in 1936 it was seized by the City of Winnipeg due to unpaid taxes. In 1944, the theatre was purchased by theatre owner Henry Morton. Odeon Cinemas' Canadian subsidiary converted the theatre to a cinema in 1945. During the conversion to a cinema, many of the original surfaces were masked, and a false ceiling was put in to close off the upper balcony. The first film to play at the converted theatre was Blood on the Sun on November 3, 1945.

In 1990, the theatre was purchased by the not-for-profit Walker Theatre Performing Arts Group. The building's original architectural features were restored, and it reopened as a venue for live performances in March 1991. In 2002, it was renamed after local musician Burton Cummings.

The theatre was designated a National Historic Site of Canada in 1991. It was also designated a Provincial Heritage Site that same year.

Signage on the front of the building was updated in 2017 by SRS Signs & Service, following a concept by Josh Dudych, the director of creative and marketing services at True North Sports and Entertainment.

Since 2023, Winnipeg Pro Wrestling has held an annual event at the Burton Cummings Theatre harkening back to wrestling shows held at the venue in the 1910s. The event has attracted performers such as Mercedes Moné, Karl Anderson, Luke Gallows, and more.

== Acquisition by True North Sports & Entertainment ==
In May 2014, the theatre was leased to locally based True North Sports & Entertainment, who assumed management of the theatre and undertook critical repairs to the building. As part of the deal, a new board was formed to run the theatre, including members from True North, CentreVenture, Forks North Portage Partnership, and the former theatre board. In Spring 2016, True North exercised its option to purchase the building from the Walker Theatre Performing Arts Group.
