= Winnipeg Pro Wrestling =

Canadian professional wrestling promotion

- Acronym: WPW
- Founded: 2018
- Style: Professional wrestling
- Headquarters: Winnipeg, Manitoba, Canada
- Owner(s): Devin Bray & Ben Kissock
- Website: Winnipeg Pro Wrestling

Winnipeg Professional Wrestling (WPW), or simply Winnipeg Pro Wrestling, is a Canadian independent professional wrestling promotion. The promotion hosts live events in Winnipeg, Manitoba, Canada and broadcasts its shows on tape delay on YouTube. It began airing on Rogers TV on March 20, 2026. WPW has two men's singles championships, one women's singles championship, and one men's tag team championship.

== History ==
Winnipeg Pro Wrestling (WPW) was established in late 2018, holding its inaugural event at the Sherbrook Inn in the Broadway neighborhood in Winnipeg, Manitoba, Canada. Following the sell-out of its debut show, the promotion transitioned to larger venues. The company is owned and operated by Devin Bray and Ben Kissock, who have managed day-to-day operations since its inception.

Since the relaxation of COVID-19 lockdowns, the promotion has increased its schedule to approximately five events per year. Its matches, typically held in venues with capacities of several hundred, frequently reach capacity shortly after tickets are released for sale.

WPW utilizes episodic storytelling with continuity across its events. The promotion maintains a roster of over 50 athletes, comprising local performers and out-of-province wrestlers who appear on a regular basis. While focusing on regional talent, WPW has featured guest appearances from internationally recognized wrestlers, including Mercedes Moné, Karl Anderson, and Luke Gallows. The promotion also features a recurring cast of on-screen personnel, including ringside security, backstage interviewers, and announcers. Co-owner Devin Bray portrays the character Gene Spungo, a color commentator distinguished by his signature cowboy hat.

Since its inception, Winnipeg Pro Wrestling has transitioned from community spaces to major municipal landmarks. The promotion's flagship annual October event "Rumble In The Burt" is held at the Burton Cummings Theatre. It set a promotion attendance record with over 1,600 fans in attendance in 2025. In addition to its residency at the West End Cultural Centre, WPW has produced events at several prominent Winnipeg venues, including Canada Life Centre, Princess Auto Stadium, Manitoba Museum, the Red River Exhibition, the Winnipeg Art Gallery, the Centennial Concert Hall, and the Winnipeg Railway Museum.

On February 25, 2026, WPW announced that the promotion would premiere on Rogers TV in Canada on March 20, marking their television debut. Rumble In The Burt 3, which was taped on October 19, 2025, will be the show that will air on the promotion's premiere.

== Championships and accomplishments ==
=== Current champions ===
Championship	Current champion(s)	Reign	Date won	Days held	Defenses	Location	Notes	Ref.
WPW Championship	Devon Monroe	1	July 17, 2026	124	1	Winnipeg, Manitoba, Canada	Defeated Chad Daniels at Tag In Tag Out. This was Monroe's Voyageur Cup title opportunity,	
WPW Women's Championship	The Matriarch	1	October 18, 2026	31	0	Winnipeg, Manitoba, Canada	Defeated Jody Threat at Rumble in the Burt 4.	
WPW Tag Team Championship	Mentallo and Tyler Colton	1	May 22, 2026	180	3	Winnipeg, Manitoba, Canada	Defeated Nu Money (Bryce Bentley and Scott Ripley III) at Sup, Bud?.	
WPW 92.1 CITI Championship	"Sweet" Bobby Schink	1	July 9, 2026	132	4	Winnipeg, Manitoba, Canada	Defeated Brax at Slam Jam 3.	

=== WPW Championship ===
WPW Championship

Details
- Promotion: Winnipeg Pro Wrestling
- Current champion: Devon Monroe
- Date won: July 17, 2026
Statistics
- First champion: AJ Sanchez
- Longest reign: AJ Sanchez (1,141 days)
- Shortest reign: Bobby Schink (254 days)
- Heaviest champion: AJ Sanchez (389 lb (176 kg))
- Lightest champion: Devon Monroe (169 lb (77 kg))

The WPW Championship is a men's professional wrestling world championship created and promoted by the Canadian promotion Winnipeg Pro Wrestling (WPW). It is the promotion's primary and most prestigious championship. As of November 18, 2026, there have been five reigns among five champions. AJ Sanchez is the inaugural champion and held the title the longest at 1,141 days; although the COVID-19 lockdown occurred during his title reign, which forced WPW to not host an event for 855 days between December 12, 2019 and April 15, 2022. Meanwhile, Bobby Schink held the title the shortest at 254 days.

Devon Monroe is the current champion in his first reign. He won the title by defeating Chad Daniels at Tag In Tag Out on July 17, 2026, in Winnipeg, Manitoba, Canada. This was Monroe's Voyageur Cup title opportunity.

Key
No.	Overall reign number
Reign	Reign number for the specific champion
Days	Number of days held
Defenses	Number of successful defenses

No.	Champion	Championship change			Reign statistics			Notes	Ref.
No.	Champion	Date	Event	Location	Reign	Days	Defenses	Notes	Ref.
1	AJ Sanchez	December 12, 2019	Pain Actually	Winnipeg, Manitoba, Canada	1	1,141	5	Defeated Tyler Colton to become the inaugural champion.	
2	Bobby Schink	January 26, 2023	Cold Out	Winnipeg, Manitoba, Canada	1	254	3		
3	Tyler Colton	October 7, 2023	Rumble At The Burt	Winnipeg, Manitoba, Canada	1	383	3		
4	James Roth	October 24, 2024	Rumble In The Burt	Winnipeg, Manitoba, Canada	1	360	9		
5	Chad Daniels	October 19, 2025	Rumble In The Burt 3	Winnipeg, Manitoba, Canada	1	271	2		
6	Devon Monroe	July 17, 2026	Tag In Tag Out	Winnipeg, Manitoba, Canada	1	124+	1+	This was Monroe's Voyageur Cup title opportunity.	

=== WPW Women's Championship ===
WPW Women's Championship

Details
- Promotion: Winnipeg Pro Wrestling
- Current champion: The Matriarch
- Date won: October 18, 2026
Statistics
- First champion: Jody Threat
- Most reigns: Jody Threat (3 reigns)
- Longest reign: Jody Threat (503 days)
- Shortest reign: Jody Threat (37 days)

The WPW Women's Championship is a women's professional wrestling world championship created and promoted by the Canadian promotion Winnipeg Pro Wrestling (WPW). As of November 18, 2026, there have been six reigns among five champions and two vacancies. Jody Threat was the inaugural champion and held the title the longest at 503 days in her first reign. She also held the title the shortest at 37 days in her second reign. She has the most reigns with three.

The Matriarch is the current champion in her first reign. She won the title by defeating Jody Threat at Rumble in the Burt 4 on October 18, 2026, in Winnipeg, Manitoba, Canada.

Key
No.	Overall reign number
Reign	Reign number for the specific champion
Days	Number of days held
Defenses	Number of successful defenses

No.	Champion	Championship change			Reign statistics			Notes	Ref.
No.	Champion	Date	Event	Location	Reign	Days	Defenses	Notes	Ref.
1	Jody Threat	September 9, 2022	Don't Tell Mom... The Referee Is Dead!	Winnipeg, Manitoba, Canada	1	503	9	Defeated Allie Katch to become the inaugural champion.	
2	Seleziya Sparx	January 25, 2024	Cold Out	Winnipeg, Manitoba, Canada	1	87	0		
—	Vacated	April 21, 2024	—	—	—	—	—	WPW stripped the title off of Seleziya Sparx due to scheduling conflicts.	
3	Vanna Black	April 28, 2024	Fight At The Museum 2	Winnipeg, Manitoba, Canada	1	134	0	Defeated Ava Lawless to win the vacant title.	
—	Vacated	September 9, 2024	—	—	—	—	—	Vanna Black vacated the title after suffering an injury.	
4	Ava Lawless	October 24, 2024	Rumble In The Burt	Winnipeg, Manitoba, Canada	1	323	6	Defeated Allie Katch to win the vacant title.	
5	Jody Threat	September 12, 2025	Nuclear Heat	Winnipeg, Manitoba, Canada	2	37	0		
6	Mercedes Moné	October 19, 2025	Rumble In The Burt 3	Winnipeg, Manitoba, Canada	1	163	0		
7	Jody Threat	March 31, 2026	Fight At The Museum 4	Winnipeg, Manitoba, Canada	3	201	4		
8	The Matriarch	October 18, 2026	Rumble in the Burt 4	Winnipeg, Manitoba, Canada	1	31+	0+		

==== Combined reigns ====
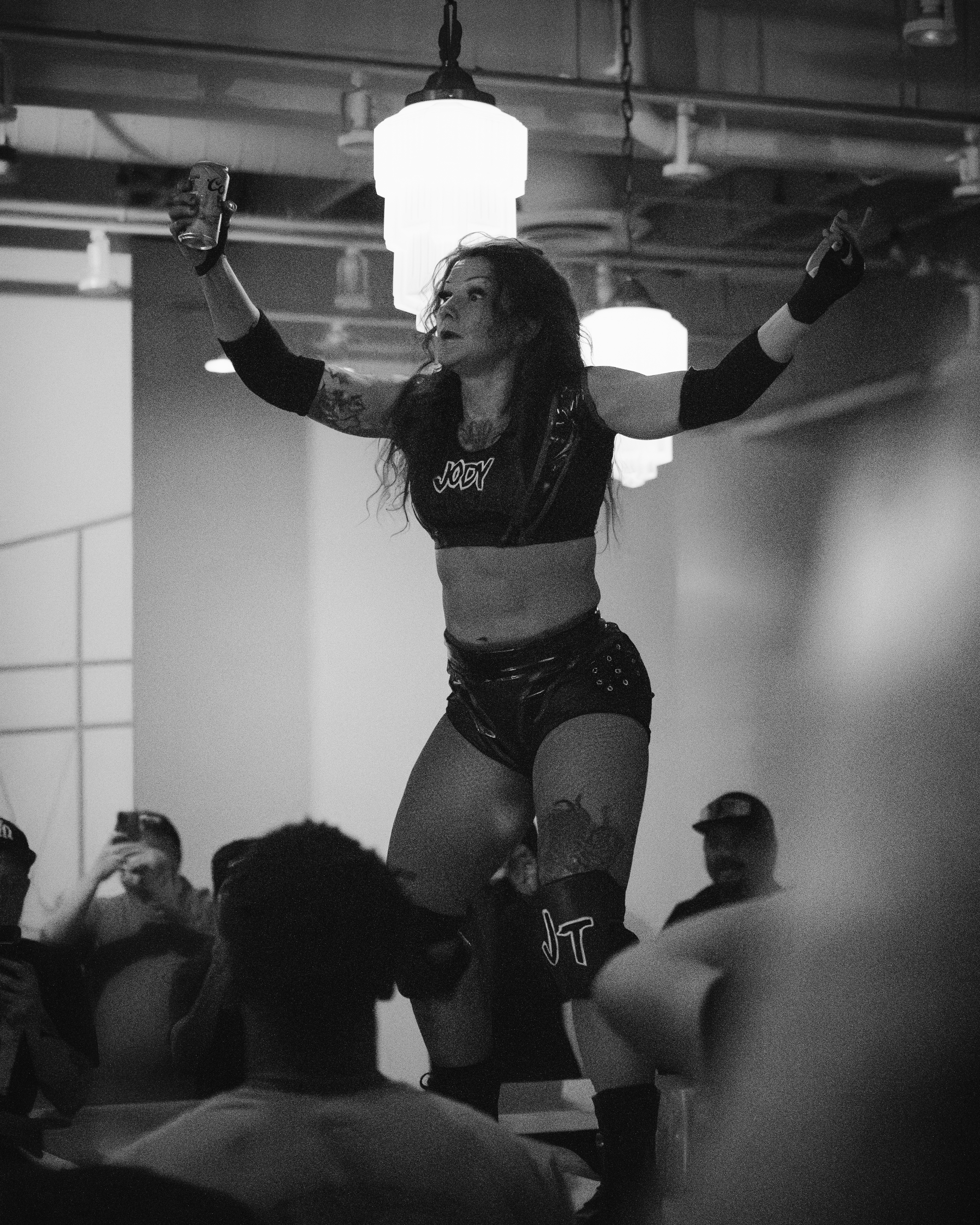
Record-setting three-time and inaugural champion Jody Threat held the title the longest at 503 days during her first reign.

†	Indicates the current champion

Rank	Wrestler	No. of reigns	Combined days	No. of defenses
1	Jody Threat	3	740	13
2	Ava Lawless	1	323	6
3	Mercedes Moné	1	163	0
4	Vanna Black	1	134	0
5	Seleziya Sparx	1	87	0
6	The Matriarch †	1	31+	0+

=== WPW 92.1 CITI Championship ===
WPW 92.1 CITI Championship

Details
- Promotion: Winnipeg Pro Wrestling
- Current champion: "Sweet" Bobby Schink
- Date won: July 9, 2026
Statistics
- First champion: Devon Monroe
- Longest reign: Sammy Peppers (163 days)
- Shortest reign: Anderson Tyler Moore (93 days)

The WPW 92.1 CITI Championship is a men's professional wrestling championship created and promoted by the Canadian promotion Winnipeg Pro Wrestling (WPW). It is named after 92.1 CITI, a commercial radio station in Winnipeg, Manitoba that broadcasts a mainstream rock format. As of November 18, 2026, there have been four reigns four three champions. Devon Monroe was the inaugural champion. Sammy Peppers held the title the longest at 163 days, while Anderson Tyler Moore held the title the shortest at 93 days.

"Sweet" Bobby Schink is the current champion in his first reign. He won the title by defeating Brax at Slam Jam 3 on July 8, 2026, in Winnipeg, Manitoba, Canada.

Key
No.	Overall reign number
Reign	Reign number for the specific champion
Days	Number of days held
Defenses	Number of successful defenses

No.	Champion	Championship change			Reign statistics			Notes	Ref.
No.	Champion	Date	Event	Location	Reign	Days	Defenses	Notes	Ref.
1	Devon Monroe	April 12, 2025	Fight At The Museum 3	Winnipeg, Manitoba, Canada	1	97	0	Defeated Anderson Tyson Moore, Big Merv, Jackson Conway, Nick Nelson, and Ronnie Attitude in a Championship Scramble match to become the inaugural champion.	
2	Anderson Tyson Moore	July 18, 2025	I Still Know Who You Pinned Last Summer	Winnipeg, Manitoba, Canada	1	93	4		
3	Sammy Peppers	October 19, 2025	Rumble In The Burt 3	Winnipeg, Manitoba, Canada	1	163	3	This was a ladder match.	
4	Brax	March 31, 2026	Fight At The Museum 4	Winnipeg, Manitoba, Canada	1	100	1		
5	"Sweet" Bobby Schink	July 9, 2026	Slam Jam 3	Winnipeg, Manitoba, Canada	1	132+	4+		

=== WPW Tag Team Championship ===
WPW Tag Team Championship

Details
- Promotion: Winnipeg Pro Wrestling
- Current champions: Mentallo and Tyler Colton
- Date won: May 22, 2026
Statistics
- First champions: Red Hot Summer; Bryce Bentley and Sammy Peppers
- Most reigns: As individual (2 reigns): Bryce Bentley; Scott Ripley III
- Longest reign: Red Hot Summer (378 days)
- Shortest reign: Bobby Schink and AJ Sanchez (173 days)

The WPW Tag Team Championship is a men's professional wrestling world ag team championship created and promoted by the Canadian promotion Winnipeg Pro Wrestling (WPW). It is a standard tag team championship, being contested by teams of two wrestlers. As of November 18, 2026, there have been four reigns among five teams and eight individual champions. Red Hot Summer (Bryce Bentley and Sammy Peppers) were the inaugural champions. They held the titles the longest at 378 days. Meanwhile, Bobby Schink and AJ Sanchez held the titles the shortest at 173 days. Bentley and Scott Ripley III are tied for the most individual reigns at two.

Mentallo and Tyler Colton are the current champions in their first reign as a team and individually. They won the titles by defeating Nu Money (Bryce Bentley and Scott Ripley III) at Sup, Bud? on May 22, 2026, in Winnipeg, Manitoba, Canada.

Key
No.	Overall reign number
Reign	Reign number for the specific champion
Days	Number of days held
Defenses	Number of successful defenses

No.	Champion	Championship change			Reign statistics			Notes	Ref.
No.	Champion	Date	Event	Location	Reign	Days	Defenses	Notes	Ref.
1	Red Hot Summer (Bryce Bentley and Sammy Peppers)	May 12, 2023	True Violence	Winnipeg, Manitoba, Canada	1	378	6	Defeated Technical Difficulties (Moses The Deliverer and Rahim De La Suede) to become the inaugural champions.	
2	The Prosperity Gospel (Scott Ripley III and Tommy Lee Curtis)	May 24, 2024	The Young & The Wrestlers	Winnipeg, Manitoba, Canada	1	247	1		
3	Bobby Schink and AJ Sanchez	January 26, 2025	Blizzardy	Winnipeg, Manitoba, Canada	1	173	2		
4	Nu Money (Bryce Bentley and Scott Ripley III)	July 18, 2025	Friday Night Fights	Winnipeg, Manitoba, Canada	1 (2, 2)	308	7	Defeated one-half of the defending champions Bobby Schink in a 2-on-1 Handicap match.	
5	Mentallo and Tyler Colton	May 22, 2026	Sup, Bud?	Winnipeg, Manitoba, Canada	1	180+	3+		

==== Combined reigns ====
===== By individual =====
†	Indicates the current champion

Rank	Wrestler	No. of reigns	Combined days	No. of defenses
1	Bryce Bentley	2	686	12
2	Scott Ripley III	2	555	7
3	Sammy Peppers	1	378	6
4	Tommy Lee Curtis	1	247	1
5	Bobby Schink	1	173	2
6	AJ Sanchez	1	173	1
7	Mentallo †	1	180+	3+
7	Tyler Colton †	1	180+	3+

=== Voyageur Cup ===
The Voyageur Cup is an annual single-elimination tournament held in March at the West End Cultural Center. The winner of the men's tournament earns a future WPW Championship match. In 2026, a women's tournament was created with the winner earning a future WPW Women's Championship match.

Year	Division	Winner	Runner-up	Event	Dates	Venue	Location	Ref.
2024	Men	**James Roth**	Chad Daniels	Winnipeg Street Fighter	March 8–9, 2024	West End Cultural Center	Winnipeg, Manitoba, Canada	
2025	Men	Bobby Schink	Tommy Billington	Normal Kombat	March 7–8, 2025	West End Cultural Center	Winnipeg, Manitoba, Canada	
2026	Women	Jody Threat	Shayna Baszler	Voyageur Cup	March 13–14, 2026	West End Cultural Center	Winnipeg, Manitoba, Canada	
2026	Men	Devon Monroe	Brax	Voyageur Cup	March 13–14, 2026	West End Cultural Center	Winnipeg, Manitoba, Canada	

Tournament brackets

2024 Voyageur Cup

1st Round; Winnipeg Street Fighter (Night 1); March 8, 2024
**Anderson Tyson Moore**	Pinfall
Mo Jabari	12:02
**Josh "Cheeks" Holiday**	Pinfall
Campbell Myers	13:08
**Chad Daniels**	Pinfall
Sammy Peppers	8:52
Michael Allen Richard Clark	Broadway
Devon Monroe	Broadway
**Mark Wheeler**	Pinfall
Solomon Tupu	9:06
**James Roth**	Pinfall
Andreas John Ziegler	10:25
**Judas Icarus**	Disqualification
AJ Sanchez	8:40
**Bobby Schink**	Pinfall
Nick Nelson	9:58

Quarterfinals; Winnipeg Street Fighter (Night 2); March 9, 2024
Anderson Tyson Moore	5:36
**Josh "Cheeks" Holiday**	Pinfall
**Chad Daniels**	Bye
N/A	—
Mark Wheeler	10:17
**James Roth**	Submission
Judas Icarus	10:45
**Bobby Schink**	Pinfall

Semifinals; Winnipeg Street Fighter (Night 2); March 9, 2024
Josh "Cheeks" Holiday	7:41
**Chad Daniels**	Pinfall
**James Roth**	Pinfall
Bobby Schink	12:35

Finals; Winnipeg Street Fighter (Night 2); March 9, 2024
Chad Daniels	7:32
**James Roth**	Pinfall

2025 Voyageur Cup

1st Round; Normal Kombat (Night 1); March 7, 2025
**Bobby Schink**	Pinfall
Tommy Lee Curtis	13:38
Jackson Conway	11:29
**Bryce Bentley**	Pinfall
**AJ Sanchez**	Pinfall
Gringo Loco	15:17
Sammy Peppers	13:39
**Michael Allen Richard Clark**	Pinfall
**Tommy Billington**	Pinfall
Dalton Rogue	7:33
**Anderson Tyson Moore**	Pinfall
Merv	9:00
**Warhorse**	Pinfall
Brent Banks	13:14
Brax	1:39
**Josh "Cheeks" Holiday**	Disqualification

Quarterfinals; Normal Kombat (Night 2); March 8, 2025
**Bobby Schink**	Countout
Bryce Bentley	3:46
**AJ Sanchez**	Pinfall
Michael Allen Richard Clark	6:00
**Tommy Billington**	Submission
Anderson Tyson Moore	5:15
**Warhorse**	No Contest
Josh "Cheeks" Holiday	– (Note: Before Josh "Cheeks" Holiday could enter the ring to start the match, he was attacked from behind by Brax. He was incapacitated after Brax locked in a full nelson and hit a chair with Holiday's head placed in it. He was not medically cleared to continue competing in the tournament so Warhorse proceeded to the semifinals by default.)

Semifinals; Normal Kombat (Night 2); March 8, 2025
**Bobby Schink**	Pinfall
AJ Sanchez	7:20
**Tommy Billington**	Pinfall
Warhorse	10:50

Finals; Normal Kombat (Night 2); March 8, 2025
**Bobby Schink**	Pinfall
Tommy Billington	10:14

2026 Women's Voyageur Cup

Quarterfinals; Voyageur Cup (Night 1); March 13, 2026
**Jody Threat**	Win
Kingsley	—
Ava Lawless	—
**Allie Katch**	Win
**Shayna Baszler**	Win
Kristara	—
**Gigi Rey**	Win
Dani Leo	—

Semifinals; Voyageur Cup (Night 2); March 14, 2026
**Jody Threat**	Win
Allie Katch	—
**Shayna Baszler**	Win
Gigi Rey	—

Finals; Voyageur Cup (Night 2); March 14, 2026
**Jody Threat**	Win
Shayna Baszler	—

2026 Men's Voyageur Cup

Quarterfinals; Voyageur Cup (Night 1); March 13, 2026
Nick Nelson	—
**Raj Singh**	Win
**Brax**	Win
Anderson Tyson Moore	—
Scott Ripley the Third	—
**Mo Jabari**	Win
Ronnie Attitude	—
**Devon Monroe**	Win

Semifinals; Voyageur Cup (Night 2); March 14, 2026
Raj Singh	—
**Brax**	Win
Mo Jabari	—
**Devon Monroe**	Win

Finals; Voyageur Cup (Night 2); March 14, 2026
Brax	—
**Devon Monroe**	Win

==== Winner's championship opportunity ====
Won the WPW Championship (men) or the WPW Women's Championship (women)
Failed to win the title

Year	Division	Tournament winner	Championship match					Ref.
Year	Division	Tournament winner	Opponent(s)	Event	Date	Venue	Location	Ref.
2024	Men	James Roth	Tyler Colton (c)	Fight At The Museum 2	April 28, 2024	Manitoba Museum	Winnipeg, Manitoba	
2025	Men	Bobby Schink	James Roth (c) and Chad Daniels (Note: This was a triple threat match that was won by Chad Daniels.)	Rumble In The Burt 3	October 19, 2025	Burton Cummings Theatre	Winnipeg, Manitoba	
2026	Women	Jody Threat	Mercedes Moné (c)	Fight At The Museum 4	March 31, 2026	Manitoba Museum	Winnipeg, Manitoba	
2026	Men	Devon Monroe	Chad Daniels (c)	Tag In Tag Out	July 17, 2026	Blue Note Park	Winnipeg, Manitoba	
(c) – denotes the defending champion

=== Rumble in the Burt match ===
The Rumble in the Burt match is a battle royal held annually at the Rumble in the Burt event at the Burton Cummings Theatre in Winnipeg, Manitoba, Canada. Similar to WWE's Royal Rumble match, the Rumble in the Burt match follows the "Rumble" style, in which two wrestlers start the match, and a new competitor would enter the match every 90 seconds. Eliminations occur by throwing a competitor over the top rope with both of their feet touching the floor. The last remaining competitor would be crowned the winner and earn a future WPW Championship match.

Won the title
Failed to win the title

List of Rumble in the Burt match winners
No.	Winner	Event	Date	Championship match result	Ref.
1	Mo Jabari	Rumble at the Burt	October 7, 2023	Lost to Tyler Colton at Pain Actually Returns on December 1, 2023.	
2	Chad Daniels	Rumble in the Burt	October 24, 2024	Defeated James Roth via disqualification at Cold Out 3 on January 26, 2025.	
3	Tyler Colton	Rumble in the Burt 3	October 19, 2025	Lost to Chad Daniels at Fight at the Museum 4 on March 31, 2026.	
4	James Roth	Rumble in the Burt 4	October 18, 2026	Will challenge for the title at Fight at the Museum 5.	

=== List of Grand Slam winners ===
The Grand Slam is a distinction given to a professional wrestler who has won the WPW World Championship, WPW 92.1 CITI Championship, WPW Tag Team Championship, and the Voyageur Cup. Bobby Schink was the first to complete this feat, completing it after winning the WPW 92.1 CITI Championship at Slam Jam 3 on July 9, 2026.

Champion	Primary championship	Secondary championship	Tag team championship	Tournament
Champion	World	92.1 CITI	Tag Team	Voyageur Cup
Bobby Schink	January 26, 2023	**July 9, 2026**	January 26, 2025	March 8, 2025
Date in bold – The date the wrestler completed the Grand Slam

== See also ==
- List of professional wrestling promotions
