= Jody Threat =

Canadian professional wrestler

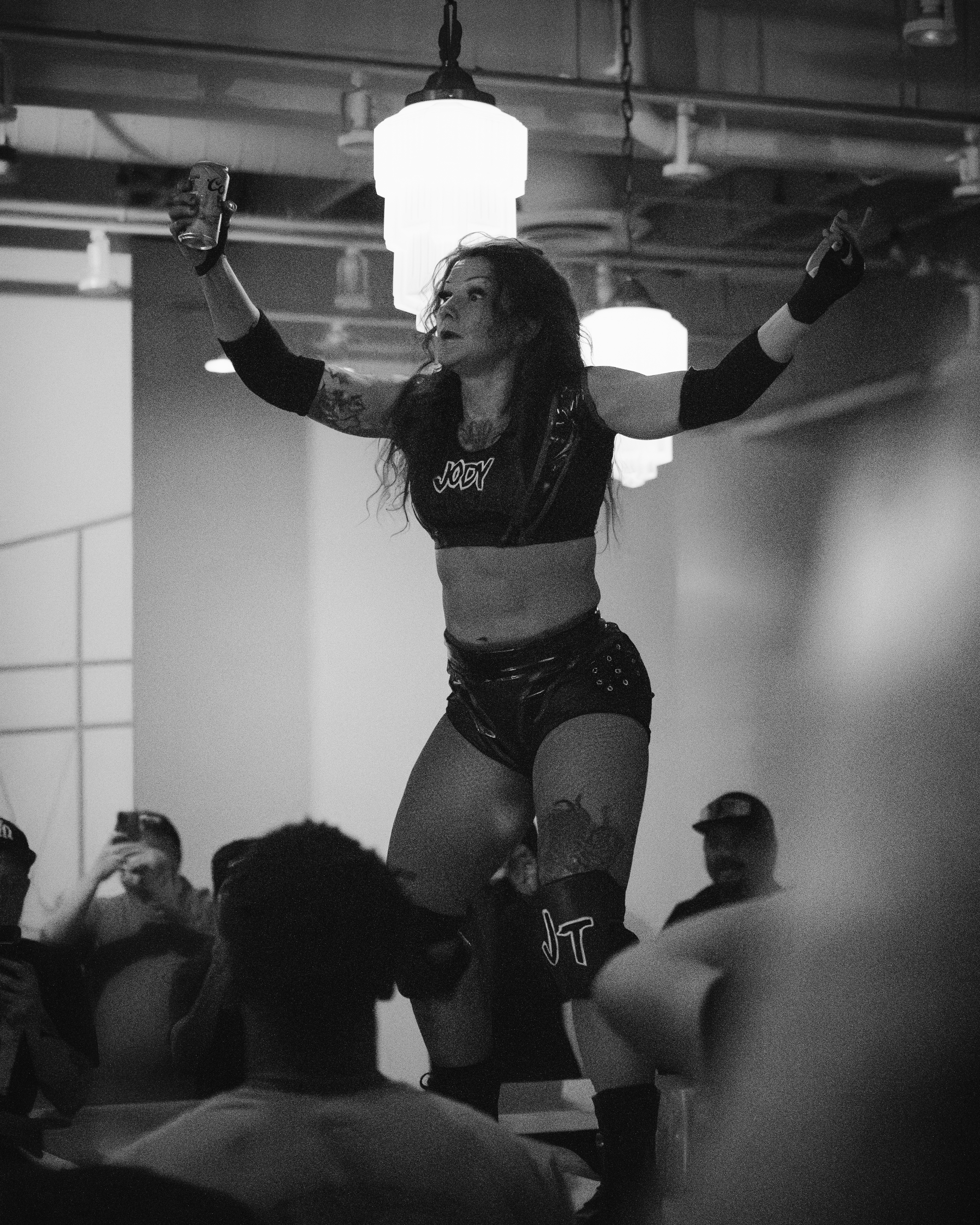
- Threat in April 2025

Personal information
- Born: Jody Gyivicsan; March 8, 1988 (age 38) Toronto, Ontario, Canada

Professional wrestling career
- Ring names: Jody Threat; Jody Nation; Natas
- Billed height: 5 ft 4 in (1.63 m)
- Billed weight: 141 lb (64 kg)
- Billed from: Toronto, Ontario, Canada
- Trained by: Josh Alexander
- Debut: October 22, 2017

Jody Gyivicsan (born March 8, 1988), known by the ring name Jody Threat, is a Canadian professional wrestler. Threat works in the independent circuit on various promotions across Canada, the United States, and the United Kingdom. She is best-known for her time in Total Nonstop Action Wrestling (TNA), where she is a former two-time TNA Knockouts World Tag Team Champion with Dani Luna.

== Professional wrestling career ==
=== Independent circuit (2017–present) ===
Threat made her debut in 2017 in the independent circuit in Ontario, Canada. She made her TV debut for Smash Wrestling on Rumble at the Border on November 25, 2017 in a losing effort to Alexia Nicole. She would continue working for Smash Wrestling on their televised shows, entering a feud with Veda Scott, culminating in Threat defeating Scott at Super Showdown VIII

In 2020, Threat began working for Game Changer Wrestling (GCW) and on October 10 of that year, she competed in a 30-person battle royal at Joey Janela's Spring Break 4. On July 3, 2021, at JCW The Great American Smash, she teamed up with Billie Starkz and Janai Kai, where they lost to YDNB. The following day, at Backyard Wrestling 3, under the ring name Natas, Threat defended the Backyard Pro Hardcore championship by defeating Rickey Crash.

On May 26, 2022, at Demand Lucha LuchaPalooza, Threat won the Demand Lucha Openweight Championship.

=== All Elite Wrestling (2022) ===
On the October 17 episode of Dark: Elevation, Threat made her debut in All Elite Wrestling (AEW), losing to Athena.

=== Impact Wrestling/Total Nonstop Action Wrestling (2023–2026) ===
On March 24, 2023, at Sacrifice, a vignette was shown anticipating Threat was coming to Impact Wrestling. She made her Impact debut on the April 6 episode of Impact!, defeating Taylor Rising. On April 10, Threat confirmed that she has signed with Impact. On the July 13 episode of Impact!, Threat suffered her first loss when she answered Knockouts World Champion Deonna Purrazzo's open challenge for the title. Two days later, on the Countdown to Slammiversary pre-show, she teamed with The Death Dollz (Courtney Rush and Jessicka) to defeat The SHAWntourage (Gisele Shaw, Savannah Evans and Jai Vidal) in a six-person tag team match.

On January 13, 2024, at Hard to Kill, Threat would compete in an Ultimate X match to determine the number one contender for the TNA Knockouts World Championship, which would be won by Gisele Shaw. On March 8, 2024 at Sacrifice, Threat and Dani Luna defeated MK Ultra (Killer Kelly and Masha Slamovich) to become the TNA Knockouts World Tag Team Championship, winning her first championship in TNA. On May 3 at Under Siege, Threat and Luna were defeated by Slamovich and Alisha Edwards, ending their reign at 56 days. They regained the TNA Knockouts World Tag Team Championship at Victory Road on September 13.

Spitfire would retain the title during the following months against Carlee Bright and Kendal Grey on Impact!, Wendy Choo and Rosemary at Bound for Glory, and Ash by Elegance and Heather by Elegance at Genesis. However, they lost the titles to Ash and Heather at Sacrifice, ending their second reign at 182 days. At Rebellion, Spitfire competed in a Four-way tag team match for the TNA Knockouts World Tag Team Championship which was won by Ash by Elegance and Heather by Elegance. On May 23, 2025 at Under Siege, Spitfire was defeated by Ash and Heather by Elegance causing Jody Threat and Dani Luna to disband. At Victory Road, Threat competed in a Battle Royal to determine who would face off for the TNA Knockouts World Championship later in the night which she lost.

At No Surrender, Threat won a Knockouts battle royal for a future TNA Knockouts World Championship. On the March 5 episode of Impact!, Threat lost to Arianna Grace failing to win the title.

On the July 30, 2026 episode of Impact!, Threat lost to Jada Stone in the Knockouts Television Title tournament. Shortly after, reports confirmed she had amicably parted ways with the company after requesting her release.

Ring of Honor Wrestling

On the November 5, 2026 episode of Ring of Honor Wrestling, Threat made her debut against Deonna Purrazzo until she lost via submission.

== Championships and accomplishments ==
- Backyard Pro
  - BYP Hardcore Championship (1 time)
- Barrie Wrestling
  - BW Heavyweight Championship (1 time)
  - BW Women's Championship (1 time, inaugural)
- Capital City Championship Combat
  - Terry Ann Gibson Memorial Tag Team Tournament (2019) – with Allie Kat
- Collective League of Adrenaline Strength and Honor
  - CLASH Women's Championship (1 time)
- Demand Lucha
  - Demand Lucha Openweight Championship (1 time)
- Destiny World Wrestling
  - Destiny Rebelution World Championship (1 time, final)
- Divine Pro Wrestling
  - DPW Championship (2 times, inaugural)
  - Tournament Of Roses (2019)
- Iron Heart Pro Wrestling
  - IHPW Women's Championship (1 time)
- Pro Wrestling Illustrated
  - Ranked No. 49 of the top 250 female singles wrestlers in the PWI Women's 250 in 2023
  - Ranked No. 215 of the top 500 singles wrestlers in the PWI 500 in 2023
- Sanctuary Fight Club
  - SFC Thrash Zone Championship (1 time)
- Smash Wrestling
  - Smash Women’s Championship (1 time, current)
- Total Nonstop Action Wrestling
  - TNA Knockouts World Tag Team Championship (2 times) – with Dani Luna
  - TNA Year End Awards
    - Knockouts Tag Team of the Year (2024) – with Dani Luna
- Winnipeg Pro Wrestling
  - WPW Women's Championship (3 times, current)
  - Women's Voyageur Cup (2026)
- WrestleCore
  - WrestleCore Infinity Championship (1 time, current)
