= Mercedes Moné =

American professional wrestler (born 1992)

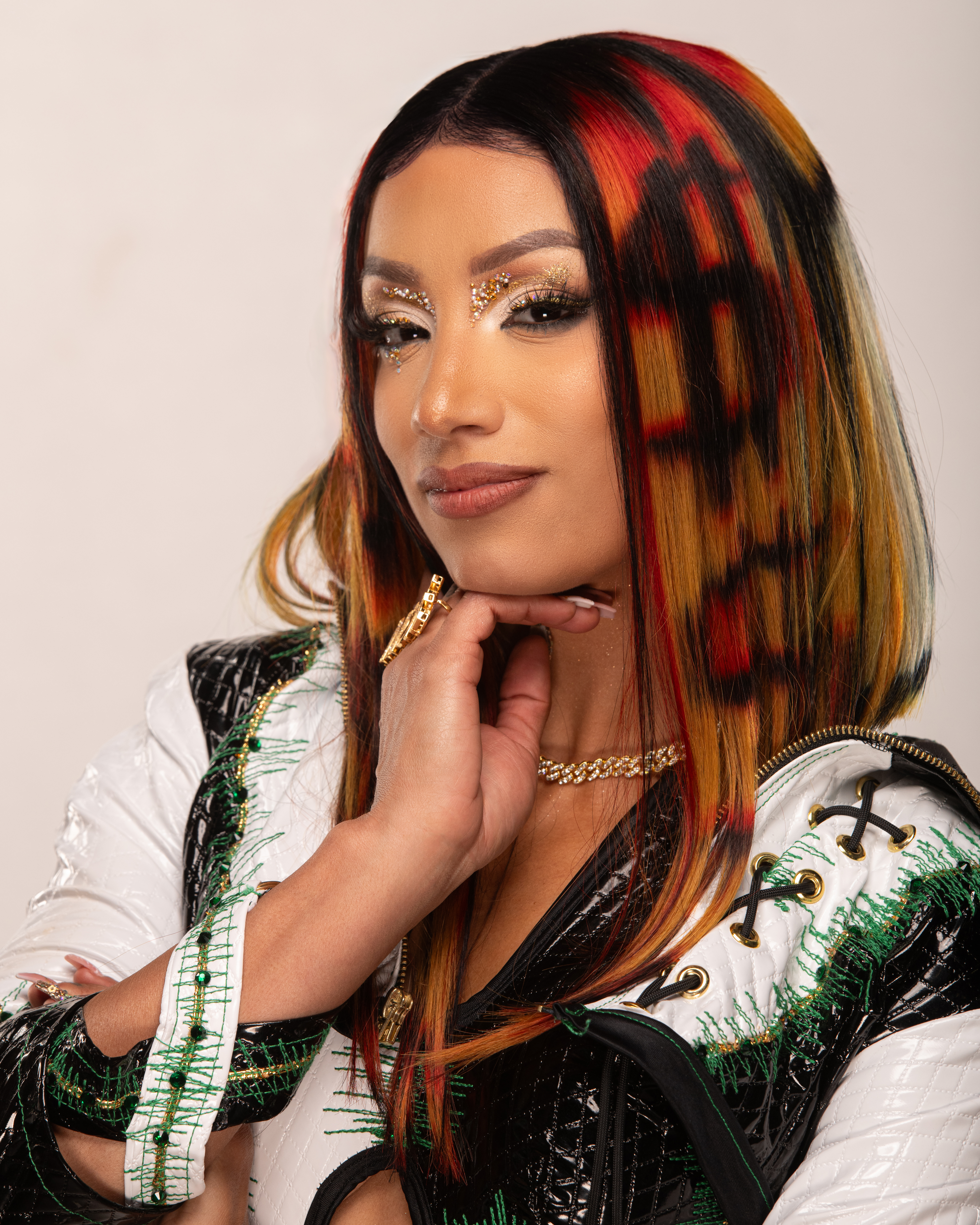
- Moné in 2024
- Born: Mercedes Justine Kaestner Varnado; January 26, 1992 (age 34); Fairfield, California, U.S.
- Occupations: Professional wrestler; actress
- Spouse: Sarath Ton (m. 2016; div. 2024)
- Relatives: Snoop Dogg (cousin); Brandy Norwood (cousin); Ray J (cousin); Daz Dillinger (cousin)
- Professional wrestling career
- Ring names: Mercedes KV; Mercedes Moné; Miss Mercedes; Sasha Banks
- Billed height: 5 ft 5 in (165 cm)
- Billed weight: 114 lb (52 kg)
- Billed from: Boston, Massachusetts; Cambridge, Massachusetts
- Trained by: Todd Smith; Brian Fury; Brian Milonas; Sara Del Rey; WWE Performance Center
- Debut: August 8, 2010

YouTube information
- Channel: Mercedes Varnado
- Years active: 2023–present
- Genre: Podcasting
- Subscribers: 44.1 thousand
- Views: 2.80 million
- Last updated: October 14, 2026
- Website: mercedesmone.com

Mercedes Justine Kaestner Varnado (born January 26, 1992) is an American professional wrestler. As of January 2024, she is signed to All Elite Wrestling (AEW), where she performs under the ring name Mercedes Moné (muh-NAY) and is the current AEW Women's World Champion in her first reign. She also appears for AEW's partners Consejo Mundial de Lucha Libre (CMLL) and New Japan Pro-Wrestling (NJPW), as well as promotions on the independent circuit. Varnado rose to prominence during her time in WWE from 2012 to 2022, where she performed under the ring name Sasha Banks.

Varnado began her wrestling career in 2010 on the independent circuit, most notably for Chaotic Wrestling. She signed with WWE in 2012 under the ring name Sasha Banks and was assigned to the developmental territory NXT, later winning the NXT Women's Championship. Her match against Bayley at NXT TakeOver: Respect in October 2015 was the first women's match to ever headline an NXT TakeOver and the first iron woman match in WWE history. Their match was named "Match of the Year" by Pro Wrestling Illustrated (PWI), with Varnado also being named "Woman of the Year".

In 2015, Varnado was promoted to WWE's main roster, where she won the WWE Raw Women's Championship five times. In 2016, she and Charlotte Flair became the first women to headline a WWE pay-per-view event, compete in a Hell in a Cell match, and win PWI's Feud of the Year. She won the inaugural WWE Women's Tag Team Championship with Bayley, and in 2020, won the WWE SmackDown Women's Championship, becoming a Grand Slam Champion and Triple Crown Champion. That year, Sports Illustrated named her "Wrestler of the Year". In the main event of WrestleMania 37 – Night 1, Varnado and opponent Bianca Belair became the first two African Americans to headline WrestleMania, WWE's flagship event.

After creative issues in 2022, Varnado left WWE, debuting as Mercedes Moné in NJPW/Stardom at Wrestle Kingdom 17, becoming a one-time IWGP Women's Champion, and signed with AEW in 2024. In her AEW in-ring debut, she won the AEW TBS Championship, her reign with which is the longest in the title's history. In 2025, she was named "Woman of the Year" by PWI for a second time, ranked No. 1 in the PWI Women's 250, and became the most simultaneously-decorated wrestler of all time, at one point holding 13 belts comprising 11 championships. (Note: The additional belts held by Moné were the 2025 Owen Hart Cup commemorative belt and the defunct Queen of Southside Championship belt, which is given to Revolution Pro Wrestling's women's champions.) In 2026, she won the AEW Women's World Championship, making her the only wrestler to become world champion across the major promotions of WWE, AEW, NJPW, and CMLL.

Outside of wrestling, she portrays the recurring character Koska Reeves in the second and third seasons of the Disney+ space western series The Mandalorian.

== Early life ==
Mercedes Justine Kaestner Varnado was born on January 26, 1992, in Fairfield, California. Her mother Judith (née Kaestner) is of German descent, while her father Reo Varnado was African American. Her family moved to various places around the United States, including Minnesota, to find schools and hospitals for her autistic brother Joshua, while she attended online schooling; they ultimately settled in Boston, where she would launch her professional wrestling career. Varnado was an early fan of professional wrestling and grew up watching All Japan Women's Pro-Wrestling (AJW), and idolizing Manami Toyota, Aja Kong, Rey Mysterio and Eddie Guerrero. She had a particular affinity for Guerrero, and was overjoyed in October 2005 to win tickets to a live WWE Monday Night Raw taping on November 13 in which Guerrero was scheduled to appear. When 13-year-old Varnado arrived at the show she was informed that Guerrero had died days previously. Varnado recalls having no idea until that moment, and weeping into her mother's arms. Later in life, Varnado would frequently pay tribute to Guerrero during her matches.

== Professional wrestling career ==
=== Early career (2010–2012) ===
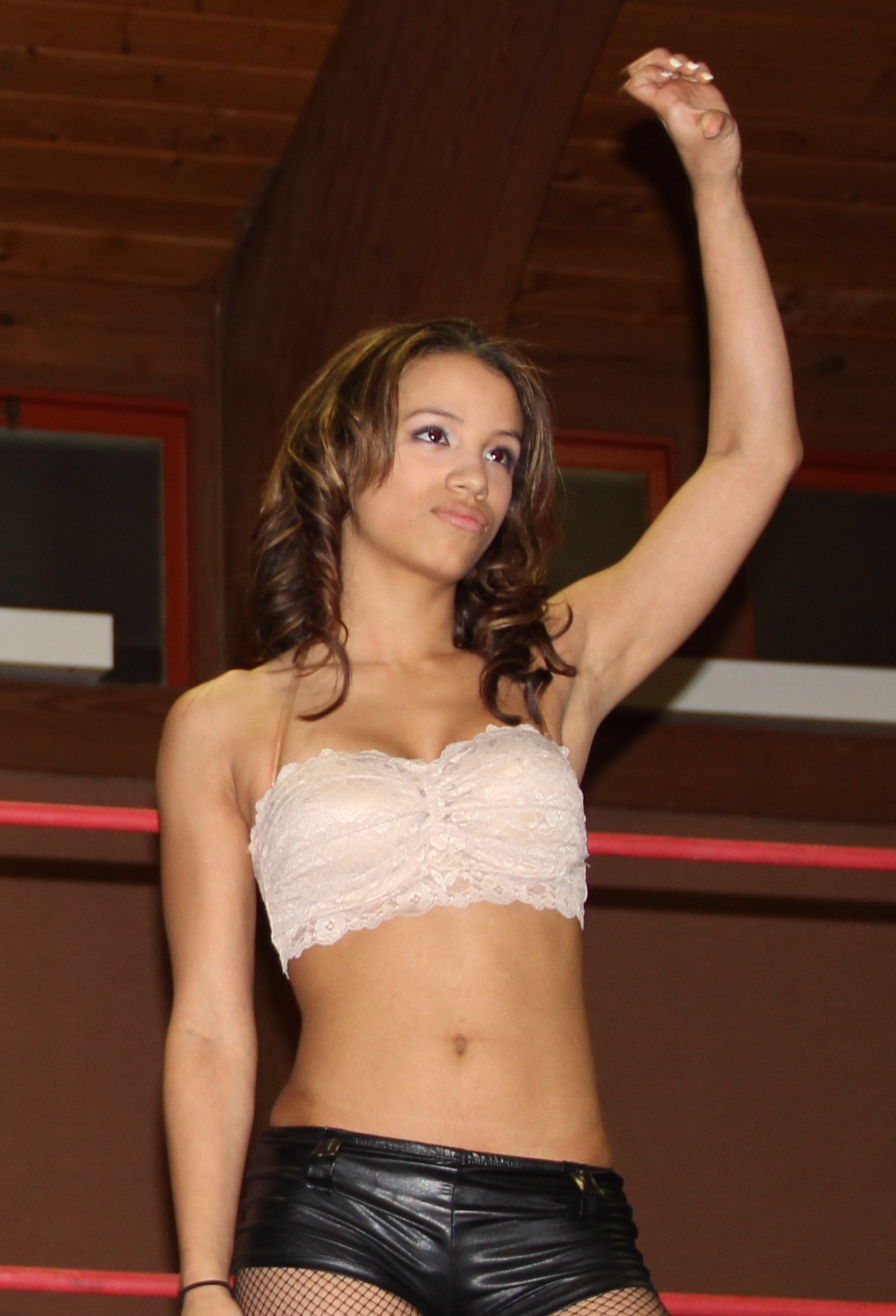
Varnado as Mercedes KV in February 2012

Varnado began training in 2008 with independent promotion Chaotic Wrestling in Woburn, Massachusetts. Among her trainers was fellow future WWE wrestler Todd "Ivar" Smith; she has alluded to her training regimen being harsh. Varnado made her debut on August 8, 2010, working under the ring name "Mercedes KV". Her first official match, put together by Smith, was a tag-team bout at the National Guard Armory in Quincy, Massachusetts, before a crowd of roughly 70 people. Varnado spent the next two years wrestling in the independent circuit, primarily for Chaotic Wrestling, New England Championship Wrestling (NECW), and the National Wrestling Alliance (NWA). She recounts being highly self-critical and competitive in her performances.

In December 2011, Varnado won the Chaotic Wrestling Women's Championship by defeating Alexxis in a "I Quit" match. She held the title for 378 days, vacating it in December 2012 after signing a contract with WWE.

=== WWE (2012–2022) ===
==== NXT (2012–2015) ====
In June 2012, Varnado participated in a WWE tryout camp and on August 18, it was announced that she had been signed to a contract. She was assigned to NXT, WWE's developmental territory, where she adopted the ring name Sasha Banks, and made her televised debut on NXT on December 12, losing to Paige. Banks then entered a storyline where she received letters from a secret admirer, who was eventually revealed to be Audrey Marie, who returned and attacked Banks on the February 20 episode of NXT, due to Marie's jealousy of Banks' success. Marie went on to defeat Banks in a match later that episode. Banks' feud with Marie came to an end on the April 3 episode of NXT, when Banks teamed with Paige to defeat Marie and Summer Rae. On the June 19 episode of NXT, Banks competed in the NXT Women's Championship tournament to determine the inaugural champion, but lost to Rae in the first round.

After Banks turned heel in September, she started a new gimmick, calling herself "The Boss". Under that gimmick, Banks wrestled Bayley, Becky Lynch and Charlotte, being known as the 4 Horsewomen.

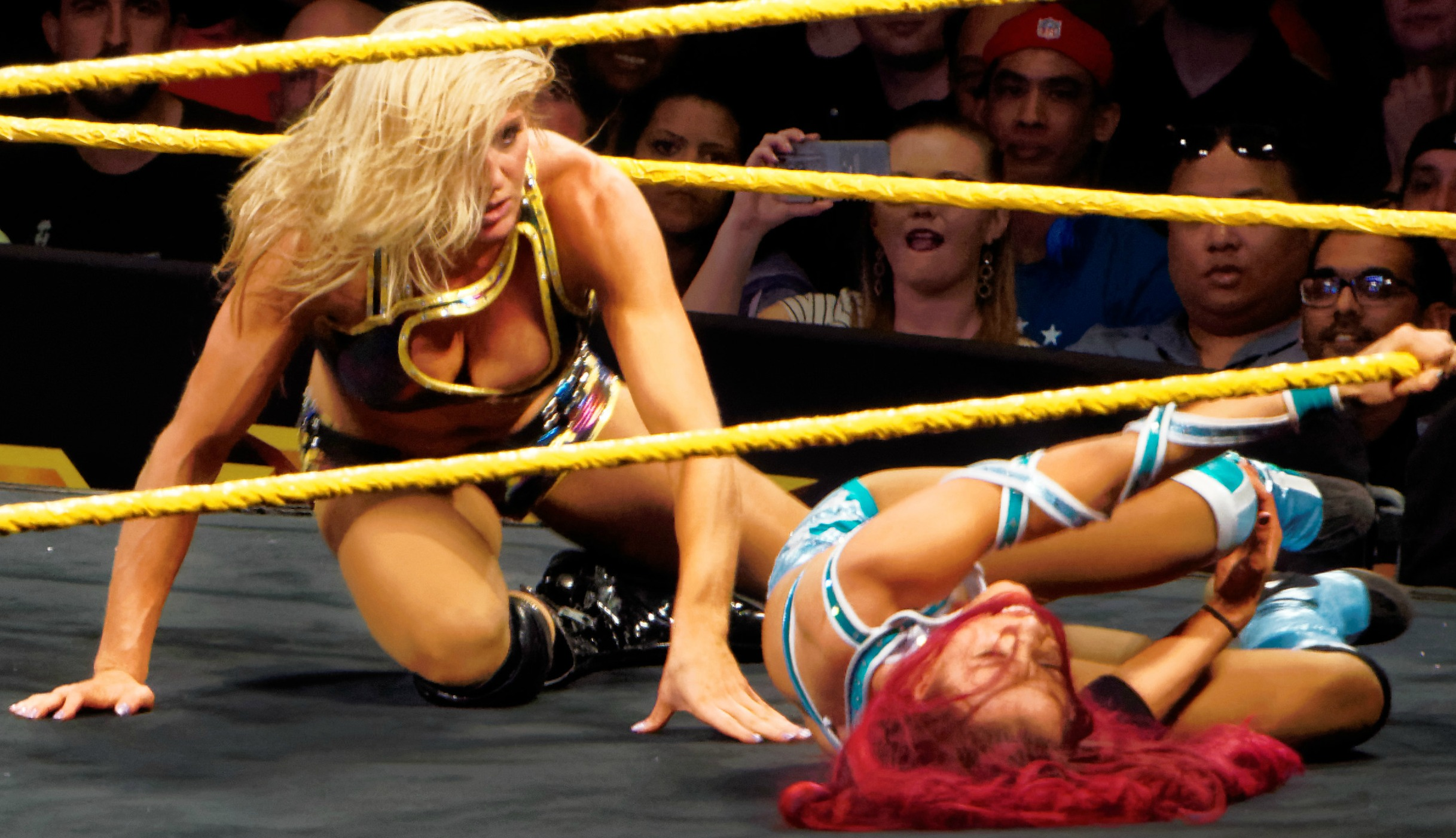
Banks wrestling Charlotte during a house show

Banks promptly began feuding with NXT Women's Champion Charlotte, leading to a match between the two at NXT TakeOver: R Evolution on December 11 with Charlotte's championship on the line, which Banks lost. Banks wrestled Charlotte twice for the title, but was defeated both times.

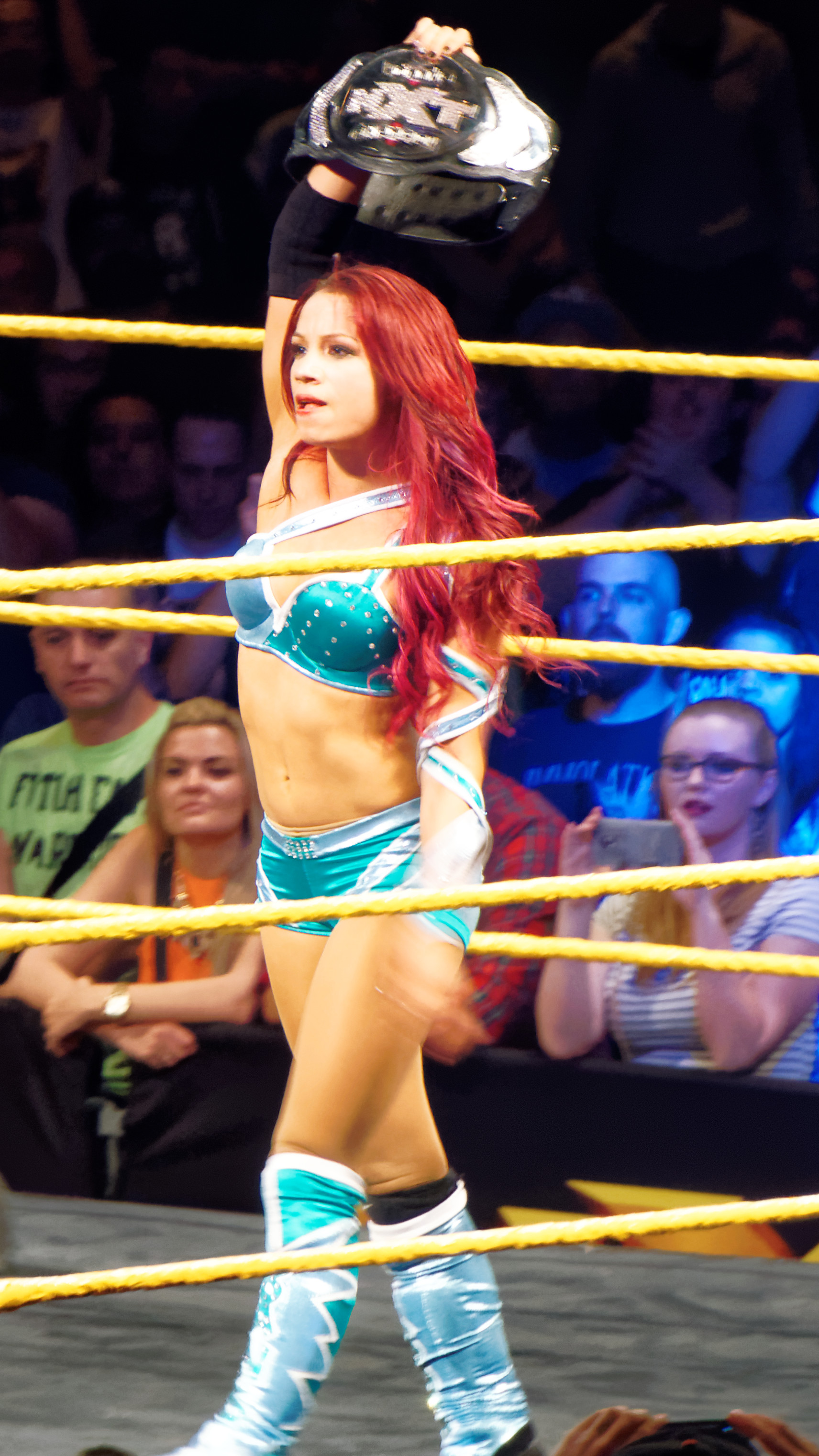
Banks as NXT Women's Champion in March 2015

On February 11, 2015, at NXT TakeOver: Rival, Banks won the NXT Women's Championship by pinning Charlotte in a fatal four-way match that also involved Lynch and Bayley. Banks successfully retained the championship against Charlotte twice, Alexa Bliss, and Becky Lynch.

At NXT TakeOver: Brooklyn on August 22, Banks dropped the NXT Women's Championship to Bayley, thus ending her reign at 192 days. The match was highly praised by critics and won Match of the Year at the NXT Year-End Awards. At NXT TakeOver: Respect on October 7, Banks was defeated by Bayley in the main event in the first women's 30-minute iron man match in WWE history, losing two falls to three.

==== Team B.A.D. (2015–2016) ====
Banks made her official debut on the July 13, 2015, episode of Raw along with Naomi and Tamina, being known as Team B.A.D. (Beautiful and Dangerous) and feuding with Team Bella (Alicia Fox, Brie and Nikki Bella). In her WWE pay-per-view debut on July 19 at Battleground, Banks competed in a triple threat match against Charlotte and Brie Bella, which Charlotte won. Banks went on to defeat Paige twice, first by submission on the July 20 episode of Raw, in a tag team match where Banks teamed with Naomi for the first time, and again on the July 27 episode of Raw in a singles match. After defeating the Divas Champion Nikki Bella by submission in a non-title match on the August 17 episode of Raw, Following this, Banks rekindled her rivalry with Paige and defeated her twice on the September 7 and 14 episodes of Raw. Although she lost in a fatal four-way number one contender's match for Charlotte's Divas Championship in November, Banks was not pinned and began a winning streak, defeating the likes of Brie Bella, Alicia Fox, and Becky Lynch on various shows.

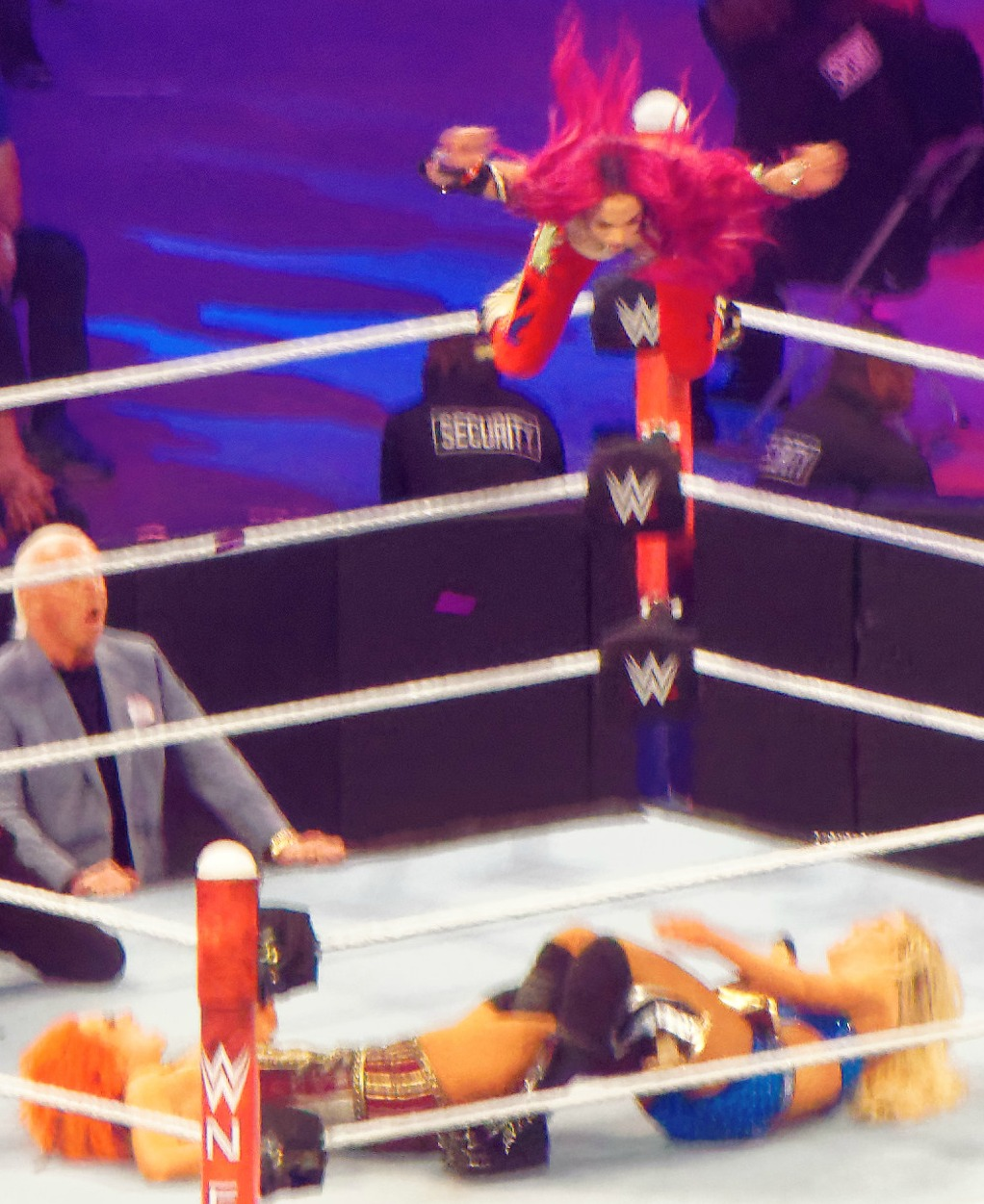
Banks hitting a frog splash during the triple threat women's title match at WrestleMania 32

After a month off television, Banks returned at the Royal Rumble pay-per-view on January 24, 2016, attacking Charlotte and Becky Lynch after their championship match, showing her intentions to gain the Divas Championship, leaving Team B.A.D. and turning Banks into a fan favorite. At Fastlane on February 21, Banks and Lynch defeated Banks' former partners Naomi and Tamina. At WrestleMania 32, Banks participated in a triple threat match also including Lynch and the WWE Divas Champion Charlotte. At the event, the Divas Championship was retired and replaced with the new WWE Women's Championship, but Banks was unsuccessful in capturing the new title.

==== Raw Women's Champion (2016–2017) ====
After a hiatus, Banks returned to WWE television in early June, and later reignited her feud with Charlotte over the WWE Women's Championship after an attack along with Paige on the June 20 episode of Raw. This led to a tag team match the following week, on the June 27 episode of Raw, where Banks and Paige scored the victory. Following multiple attacks and matches between Banks and Dana Brooke, Banks and her mystery partner Bayley defeated Brooke and Charlotte in a tag team match on July 24 at Battleground.

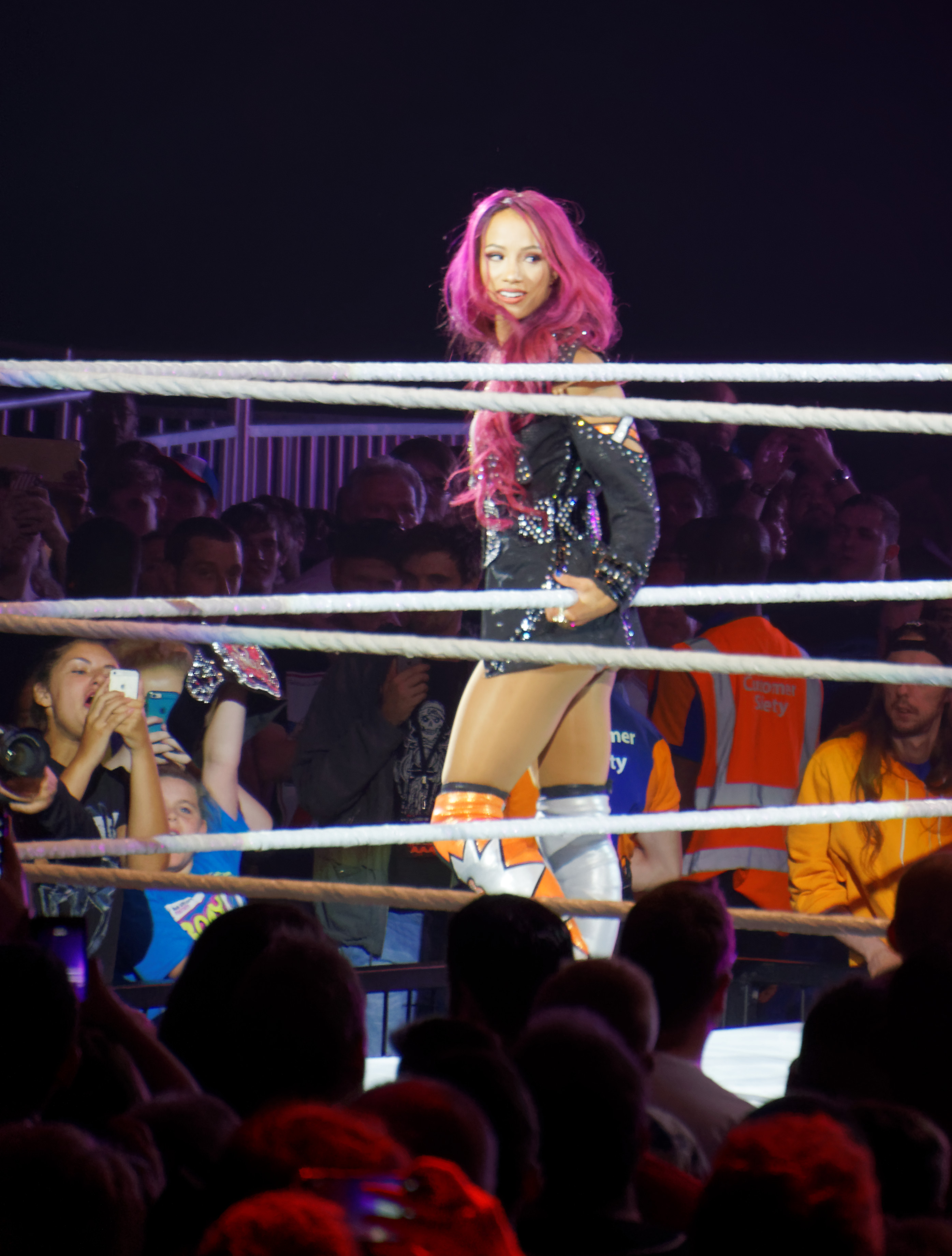
Banks in September 2016

After being drafted to the Raw brand as part of the 2016 WWE draft on July 19, 2016, Banks made her first appearance for the brand on July 25, where she defeated Charlotte to win the WWE Women's Championship for the first time. On August 21 at SummerSlam, Banks dropped the championship back to Charlotte, ending her reign at 27 days. Around that time, the title was renamed the Raw Women's Championship following the creation of the SmackDown Women's Championship. On September 25, Charlotte successfully retained the championship against Banks and Bayley in a triple threat match at Clash of Champions. Banks was granted a one-on-one rematch on the October 3 episode of Raw, where she defeated Charlotte in the main event to capture her second Raw Women's Championship. Banks challenged Charlotte to compete for the championship in the first ever women's Hell in a Cell match at the titular Hell in a Cell pay-per-view event on October 30, which was then announced as the main event, making it the first time women had received the last match of a pay-per-view card in WWE. At the event, Charlotte defeated Banks, again ending her reign at 27 days. A few weeks later, on November 20, Banks was part of Raw's women's team for Survivor Series, during which she was eliminated by Natalya, but Team Raw was ultimately victorious. On the November 28 episode of Raw, after invoking her rematch clause a week prior, Banks defeated Charlotte in a falls count anywhere match to win the Raw Women's Championship for the record-tying third time. A 30-minute iron man match between the two took place at Roadblock: End of the Line on December 18, which resulted in a 2–2 draw, but Banks lost to Flair 3–2 in sudden death overtime. With the loss, the feud between the two ended, since it was stipulated that Banks could not invoke her rematch clause if she lost. On the February 13 episode of Raw, Banks helped Bayley defeat Flair to win the Raw Women's Championship. At WrestleMania 33, Banks participated in a fatal four-way elimination match for the title, where Bayley retained the championship.

Months later, after winning the first-ever women's Gauntlet Match, Banks faced Alexa Bliss for the Raw Women's Championship. Bliss retained the title at Great Balls of Fire, but Banks won it at SummerSlam. Eight days later, Banks dropped the title back to Bliss on Raw. At No Mercy on September 24, Banks received her rematch for the title as she took part in a fatal five-way match which was won by Bliss.

==== The Boss 'n' Hug Connection (2017–2019) ====
In December, Banks competed in the first-ever women's match contested in Abu Dhabi against Alexa Bliss. In 2018, Banks was the first entrant in the inaugural Women's Royal Rumble match, where she lasted 54:46, and the first women's Elimination Chamber match.

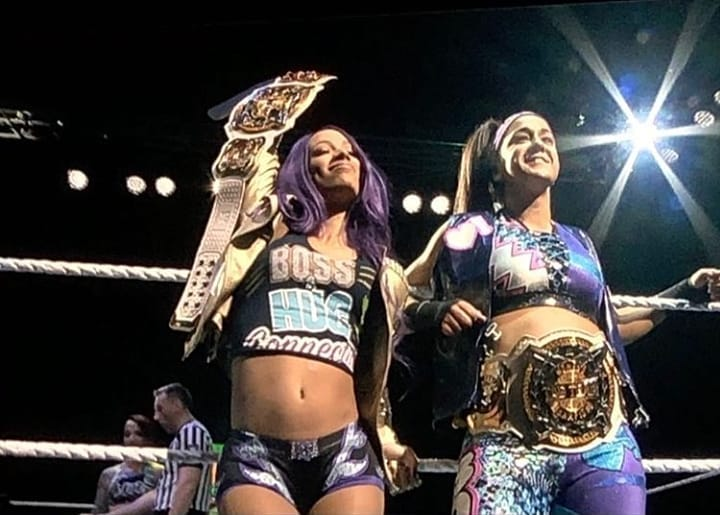
The Boss 'n' Hug Connection as WWE Women's Tag Team Champions in 2019

On the March 26 episode of Raw, after weeks of animosity between the two, including Banks betraying Bayley during their matches, they brawled backstage and had to be separated. Banks and Bayley faced off in mid-April but their match ended in a no-contest after The Riott Squad (Ruby Riott, Sarah Logan, and Liv Morgan) interfered and attacked them both. In the following weeks, Banks competed in different singles and tag team matches in both winning and losing efforts. In June, after she defeated Ruby Riott in the finals of a gauntlet match for the last spot, Banks competed in a Money in the Bank ladder match for the first time in her career, that was ultimately won by Alexa Bliss. Throughout mid-2018, after Banks and Bayley continued to attack each other, they were told to attend counsellor meetings to help maintain their friendship. In July, the two reconciled and created a tag team, known as "The Boss 'n' Hug Connection".

After a short hiatus from the ring due to an undisclosed injury, Banks returned to WWE television in October, and took part in the first-ever all women's pay-per-view Evolution, where she teamed with Bayley and Natalya in a winning effort against The Riott Squad. In November, Banks again competed at Survivor Series as part of Team Raw, where she was the last woman from the team that was eliminated by Asuka after an attack by teammate Nia Jax. On January 27, 2019, at the Royal Rumble, after she defeated Nia Jax to earn herself a title match, Banks unsuccessfully challenged Ronda Rousey for the Raw Women's Championship. During the match with Rousey, Banks suffered a separated shoulder.

On February 17, at the Elimination Chamber, Banks and Bayley won the inaugural WWE Women's Tag Team Championship by lastly eliminating Mandy Rose and Sonya Deville in a six tag team Elimination Chamber match. In their first title defense, Banks and Bayley successfully retained over Nia Jax and Tamina, at Fastlane, on March 10. At WrestleMania 35 on April 7, Banks and Bayley lost the championship to The IIconics (Billie Kay and Peyton Royce) in a fatal four-way tag team match, ending their first reign at 49 days.

==== Hiatus and renewed alliance with Bayley (2019–2020) ====
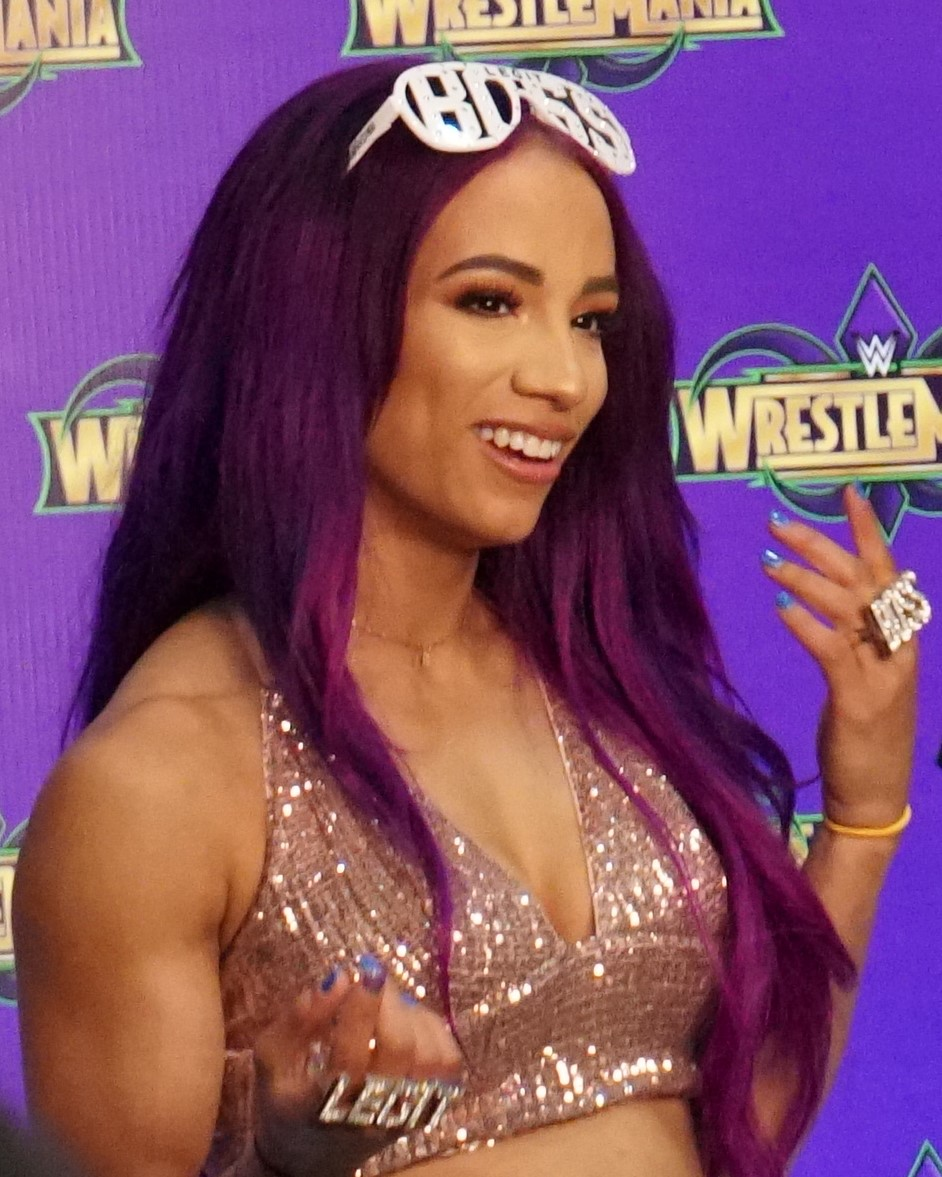
Banks in 2018

The following day, Banks cancelled an appearance on the morning talk show Wendy at the last minute. Throughout the week, speculation from dirt sheets emerged that she was looking to quit the company due to her longstanding frustrations with WWE. Banks held the impression that she and Bayley were going to have a long title reign to bring credibility to the WWE Women's Tag Team Championship, with the two allegedly not being informed until the last minute that they would be dropping the titles at WrestleMania. Her talk show cancellation was reported to be due to a personal matter. As she had been dealing with depression, she asked Vince McMahon for her release. While McMahon denied her request, he granted Banks time off to reconsider her career.

After a four-month hiatus, Banks returned and was paired with Bayley, both as heels. Upon her return, Banks reignited her feud with Raw Women's Champion Becky Lynch, leading to a Raw Women's Championship match at Clash of Champions. At the event, Banks took a win via disqualification, however, Lynch retained. Their feud eventually led to the second ever women's Hell in a Cell match at the titular event, in which Banks was unsuccessful in winning the title. After she was drafted to the SmackDown brand as part of the 2019 draft, she then went on another brief hiatus from TV due to injuring her tailbone. When she returned, she was named captain of the SmackDown women's team, leading into Survivor Series. At the pay-per-view, Banks was the last woman standing for the SmackDown brand in the Women's Survivor Series match, but was pinned by Rhea Ripley from Team NXT, who won the match. At WrestleMania 36, she participated in a fatal five-way elimination match for Bayley's SmackDown Women's Championship, where the champion retained.

==== SmackDown Women's Champion (2020–2021) ====
After WrestleMania 36, Banks and Bayley would begin teasing a potential feud between the two, with the emphasis being put on the narrative that Banks is the reason for Bayley's success and that Bayley is responsible for most of Banks' losing efforts. Despite their brewing dispute, Banks and Bayley reclaimed the WWE Women's Tag Team Championship on the June 5 episode of SmackDown by defeating Alexa Bliss and Nikki Cross. During the reign, Banks and Bayley began feuding with Raw Women's Champion Asuka, leading to a Raw Women's Championship match between Banks and Asuka at The Horror Show at Extreme Rules, which ended in a controversial finish. A rematch took place eight days later on Raw, where Banks defeated Asuka to win the Raw Women's Championship for a record-setting fifth time. With the win, Banks and Bayley became the first female tag team—and the fifth overall—in history to hold singles and tag team titles simultaneously. Throughout August, Asuka and Banks continued their feud, which culminated in a title match at SummerSlam on August 23, where Banks dropped the Raw Women's Championship back to Asuka. A week later at Payback, Banks and Bayley dropped the WWE Women's Tag Team Championship to Nia Jax and Shayna Baszler, ending their second reign at 85 days.

On the September 4 episode of SmackDown, after losing a rematch to Jax and Baszler, Bayley turned on Banks by brutally attacking her in the ring, thereby turning the latter face in the process and disbanding their team. The feud between the two eventually culminated in a Hell in a Cell match at the eponymous pay-per-view, where Banks submitted Bayley to win the SmackDown Women's Championship for the first time in her career. With the win, Banks became the third Women's Grand Slam and fourth Triple Crown Champion. On the November 6 episode of SmackDown, Banks defeated Bayley in a SmackDown Women's Championship rematch to retain the title, thus ending her drought of unsuccessful defenses with a main roster singles title. At the TLC: Tables, Ladders & Chairs event on December 20, Banks defeated Carmella by submission to retain the SmackDown Women's Championship.

At the Royal Rumble pay-per-view on January 31, Banks defeated Carmella in a rematch from TLC to retain the SmackDown Women's Championship. Later on in the night, Bianca Belair would go on to win the women's Royal Rumble match, thereby granting her an opportunity to challenge for a women's championship of her choice at WrestleMania 37. In the weeks to follow, Banks and Belair would proceed to build up to the reveal of Belair's opponent of choice on SmackDown, up until the February 26 episode of the aforementioned show, when Belair officially chose to face Banks for the SmackDown Women's Championship at the event. Over the following month, the two would team up to challenge Nia Jax and Shayna Baszler for the WWE Women's Tag Team Championship at the Elimination Chamber and Fastlane pay-per-view events, but were unsuccessful. On April 9, WWE announced that the bout between Banks and Belair would main-event Night 1 of WrestleMania 37, thus marking the first time in the company's history that two African-American women would face each other in a marquee match. Furthermore, the two were the first African-American wrestlers in WrestleMania history to have faced each other in the main event of the show. At the event, Banks dropped the SmackDown Women's Championship to Belair, ending her reign at 167 days.

After Banks' return in July, she was booked to face Bianca Belair for the SmackDown Women's Championship at SummerSlam, but was ultimately pulled from the event. She had the title match at Crown Jewel on October 21, but as a triple threat match also involving new champion Becky Lynch, where Banks was unsuccessful at regaining the title. At Survivor Series in November, Banks was captain of the SmackDown women's team, where she was eliminated via countout following interference from her teammates.

==== Reunion with Naomi and departure (2022) ====
On January 2, 2022, Varnado sustained a calcaneus injury during a house show match against Charlotte Flair. She would make her return on the January 28 episode of SmackDown, where she declared herself an entrant for the Women's Royal Rumble match. At the namesake event, Banks entered first, eliminating Melina and Kelly Kelly before being eliminated by Zelina Vega. On the February 25 episode of SmackDown, Naomi announced that she and Banks were going to challenge for the WWE Women's Tag Team Championship. At Night 2 of WrestleMania 38, Banks and Naomi won the WWE Women's Tag Team Championship for the first time as a team, the first time for Naomi and the third time for Banks.

Banks and Naomi's title defense on the May 13 episode of SmackDown would be Banks' last televised WWE appearance, and their match at a WWE Live event on May 15 proved to be Banks' final WWE match, as during the May 16 episode of Raw, Banks and Naomi reportedly walked out on WWE due to a creative dispute with Vince McMahon. WWE released an official statement claiming that the two "walked into WWE Head of Talent Relations John Laurinaitis' office with their suitcases in hand, placed their tag team championship belts on his desk and walked out". The two were originally booked for the show's main event, which had to be reworked. On the following episode of SmackDown, it was announced that Banks and Naomi had been suspended indefinitely, therefore vacating the titles, ending their reign at 46 days. In December 2022, it was reported that negotiations over compensation had fallen through during the summer and that Banks was done with WWE.

=== New Japan Pro-Wrestling / World Wonder Ring Stardom (2023–present) ===
After months of speculation, Varnado made her debut appearance for New Japan Pro-Wrestling (NJPW) on January 4, 2023, at Wrestle Kingdom 17. Now going by the ring name Mercedes Moné, she confronted and subsequently attacked reigning IWGP Women's Champion Kairi and announced that she had joined both NJPW and its sister promotion World Wonder Ring Stardom, establishing herself as a heel. This led to a title match between the two at Battle in the Valley on February 18, in which Moné defeated Kairi to win the title. In her first title defense at Sakura Genesis on April 8, Moné defeated AZM and Hazuki in a three-way match. After the match, Mayu Iwatani challenged Moné to a title match Stardom All Star Grand Queendom. At the event, Moné lost the IWGP Women's Championship to Iwatani, ending her reign at 64 days. At Resurgence on May 21, Moné participated in a tournament to crown the inaugural Strong Women's Champion, defeating Stephanie Vaquer to advance to the finals, before losing to Willow Nightingale. Moné sustained an ankle injury during the match against Nightingale. In December 2023, it was reported that Moné was no longer under contract with NJPW.

On June 30, 2024, at Forbidden Door, Moné defeated Stephanie Vaquer to win the Strong Women's Championship in a Winner Takes All match that also involved Moné's AEW TBS Championship. She successfully defended her title against Momo Watanabe at Capital Collision and Hazuki at Strong Style Evolved. Moné then defeated Mina Shirakawa in a Winner Takes All match at Wrestle Dynasty on January 5, 2025, retaining the Strong title and winning Shirakawa's Undisputed British Women's Championship. With the TBS Championship, this made her a triple champion across three promotions. On May 9 at Resurgence, Moné lost the Strong Women's Championship to AZM in a three-way match also involving Shirakawa.

=== All Elite Wrestling (2024–present) ===
==== Longest-reigning TBS Champion (2024–2025) ====
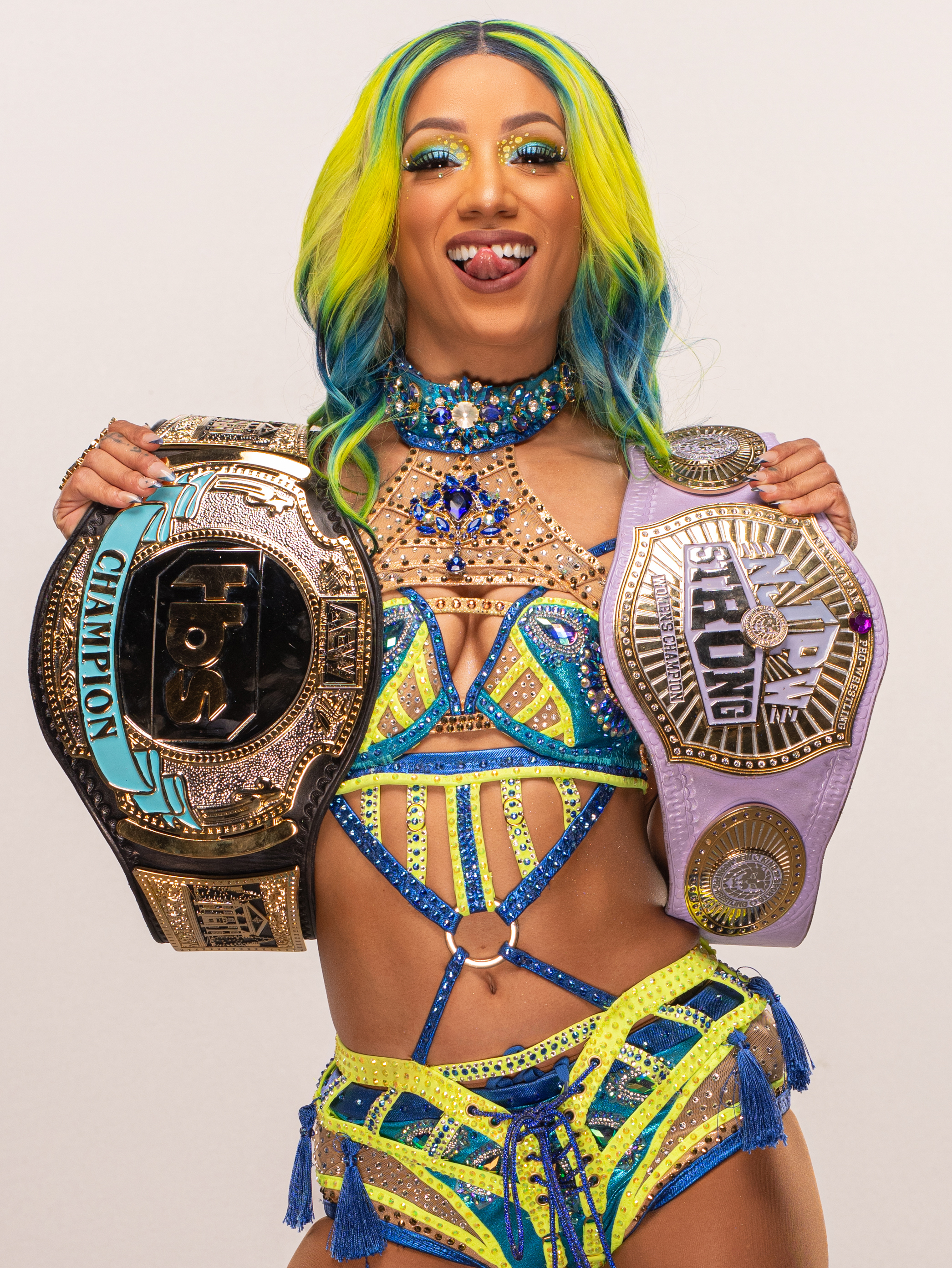
In her first match in AEW, Moné captured the AEW TBS Championship from Willow Nightingale. 35 days later, she defeated Stephanie Vaquer to win the NJPW Strong Women's Championship.

In August 2023, Moné made a cameo appearance as an audience member at the All Elite Wrestling (AEW) pay-per-view event All In. In February 2024, Fightful and Andrew Zarian of Mat Men Radio reported that Moné had signed with AEW the previous month. Moné officially debuted for AEW on March 13, 2024, on a special episode of Dynamite titled Big Business as a babyface, which took place at the TD Garden in her adopted hometown of Boston. At the end of the episode, Moné came to the ring to save Willow Nightingale from an attack by Julia Hart and Skye Blue.

Within the span of 35 days, Moné made her in-ring debut at on May 26 at Double or Nothing, where she defeated Nightingale to win the AEW TBS Championship and later won the Strong Women's Championship from Stephanie Vaquer on June 30 at Forbidden Door, becoming a double champion in the process. Moné would spend the rest of 2024 retaining the TBS Championship against wrestlers like Britt Baker at All In (during which time she turned heel and introduced Kamille as her bodyguard, working with her until November), Hikaru Shida at All Out, and Kris Statlander twice at Full Gear and Worlds End.

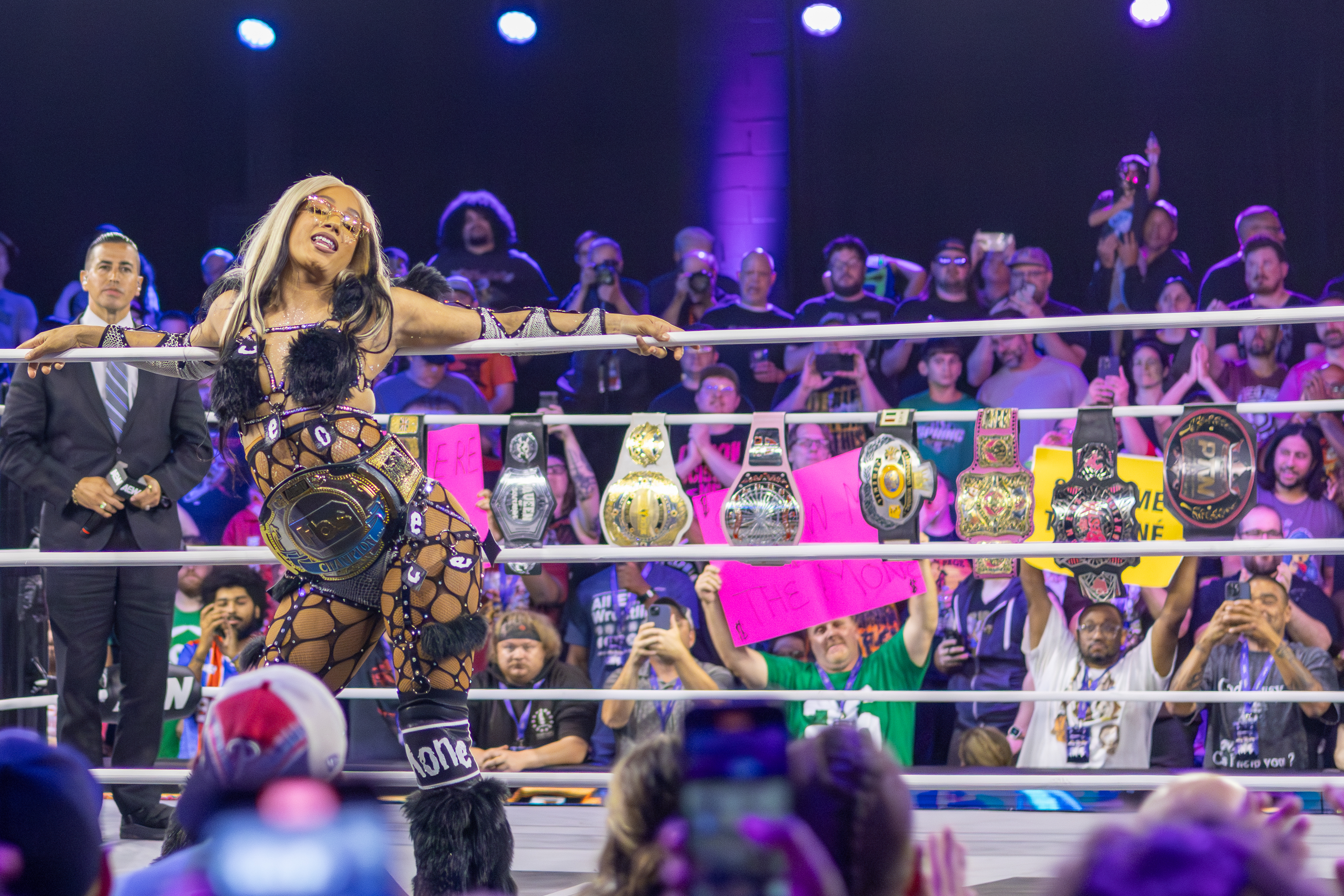
Moné in September 2025, showcasing nine of a total thirteen belts she held simultaneously that year.

In 2025, Moné successfully defended the TBS Championship against Harley Cameron at Grand Slam Australia and Momo Watanabe at Revolution before winning the women's Owen Hart Cup, defeating Julia Hart, Athena, and Jamie Hayter. She subsequently unsuccessfully challenged Toni Storm for the AEW Women's World Championship on July 12 at All In, suffering her first singles loss in AEW. She continued to defend the TBS Championship against Alex Windsor, Bozilla, and Persephone at Forbidden Door in a four-way match and Riho at All Out, surpassing Jade Cargill's record for the longest reign with the title. At WrestleDream on October 18, she defeated Mina Shirakawa in a Winner Takes All match to win the Interim ROH Women's World Television Championship, becoming the first wrestler in nearly 30 years to hold 11 championships simultaneously. She subsequently adopted the nickname "Último Moné" in reference to Último Dragón. She later competed in the first women's Blood and Guts match on November 12, where her team was victorious. On the November 19 episode of Collision, Moné defeated Red Velvet to become the undisputed ROH Women's World Television Champion. On November 22 at Full Gear, she unsuccessfully challenged Kris Statlander for the AEW Women's World Championship. In December, she lost the ROH Women's World Television Championship to Red Velvet at Final Battle, the Undisputed British Women's Championship to Alex Windsor at Collision: Holiday Bash, and the TBS Championship to Willow Nightingale at Dynamite: New Year's Smash, ending her record-setting reign at 584 days.

==== AEW Women's World Champion (2026–present) ====
Following a five-month hiatus, Moné returned to AEW on the June 3, 2026, episode of Dynamite as the Wild Card in the women's bracket of the 2026 Owen Hart Cup. After defeating Alex Windsor and Hazuki in the quarterfinal and semifinal rounds respectively, Moné defeated co-finalist Maya World at Forbidden Door on June 28, winning the tournament for a second year in a row. This made her the first two-time Owen Hart Cup winner and earned her a shot at the AEW Women's World Championship at All In on August 30. At the event, she defeated champion Willow Nightingale to win the title, making her the first and only wrestler to win world championships across the major promotions of WWE, AEW, NJPW, and CMLL. Through the fall, Moné successfully defended her title against Queen Aminata at Grand Slam France on October 6, against Thekla at WrestleDream on October 17, and against Marina Shafir at Full Gear on November 14.

=== Consejo Mundial de Lucha Libre (2024–present) ===
Moné made her Consejo Mundial de Lucha Libre (CMLL) debut on June 22, 2024, at Fantastica Mania Mexico, where she confronted Stephanie Vaquer ahead of their match at Forbidden Door. On June 18, 2025, at Grand Slam Mexico, Moné defeated Zeuxis to win the CMLL World Women's Championship. Two days later, at Fantastica Mania Mexico, Moné successfully defended the title against La Catalina. On the October 17 episode of Viernes Espectacular, Moné defeated Persephone to retain her title. She would later drop the belt to Persephone at La Noche de las Amazonas on March 6, 2026, ending her reign at 261 days.

=== Independent circuit (2025–present) ===
On March 15, 2025, Moné made her debut for House of Glory (HOG) at City of Dreamz, defeating ROW Women's Champion Indi Hartwell in a non-title match. After winning the Revolution Pro Wrestling (RevPro) Undisputed British Women's Championship at Wrestle Dynasty in January 2025, she successfully defended it against Kanji at High Stakes and against Safire Reed at Summer Sizzler. On June 6, Moné made a surprise appearance at Pratercatchen, an event produced by the European Wrestling Association (EWA), where she defeated the EWA Women's Champion Lexa Valo to win the title in a three-way match also involving Mila Smidt. On July 27, she made her debut for Polish promotion Prime Time Wrestling (PTW) at a special event called All About The Moné, where she defeated Diana Strong to win both the inaugural PTW Women's Championship and the inaugural BestYa Women's Championship – a title in the Italian promotion BestYa Wrestling.

At Global Wars UK on August 22, 2025, Moné won Discovery Wrestling's DW Scottish Women's Championship from Emersyn Jayne. In October, she captured two titles: the Bodyslam Women's Championship and the WPW Women's Championship. On November 15, at HOG SuperClash, she also won the APAC Women's Championship from Nor 'Phoenix' Diana. After this, Moné would go on a global losing streak up until March 2026, dropping all eight independent titles she'd won in 2025 over the course of four months. (Note: She dropped the Undisputed British Women's Championship on December 20, 2025; the BestYa Women's Championship on March 8, 2026; the EWA Women's Championship on March 14; the Bodyslam Women’s Championship and the DW Scottish Women's Championship on March 21; the PTW Women's Championship on March 29; and the WPW Women's Championship on March 31. She vacated the APAC Women's Championship on April 4 due to logistical issues with APAC Wrestling.)

== Professional wrestling persona ==
Varnado developed the persona of "The Boss" Sasha Banks in the mid-2010s, an unshakably confident character who sported shutter‑style sunglasses, ostentatious rings and chains, and a no‑nonsense attitude, all while touting her self‑proclaimed status as NXT's (and later WWE’s) elite performer. Following her departure from WWE and entry into the AEW and NJPW spheres, she evolved her persona into "The CEO" Mercedes Moné, a woman who sees herself as running every division she enters. As Moné, Varnado has focused on incorporating fashion into her character, such as wearing a fur coat reportedly worth $20,000 to the ring during her entrance at AEW Full Gear 2024.

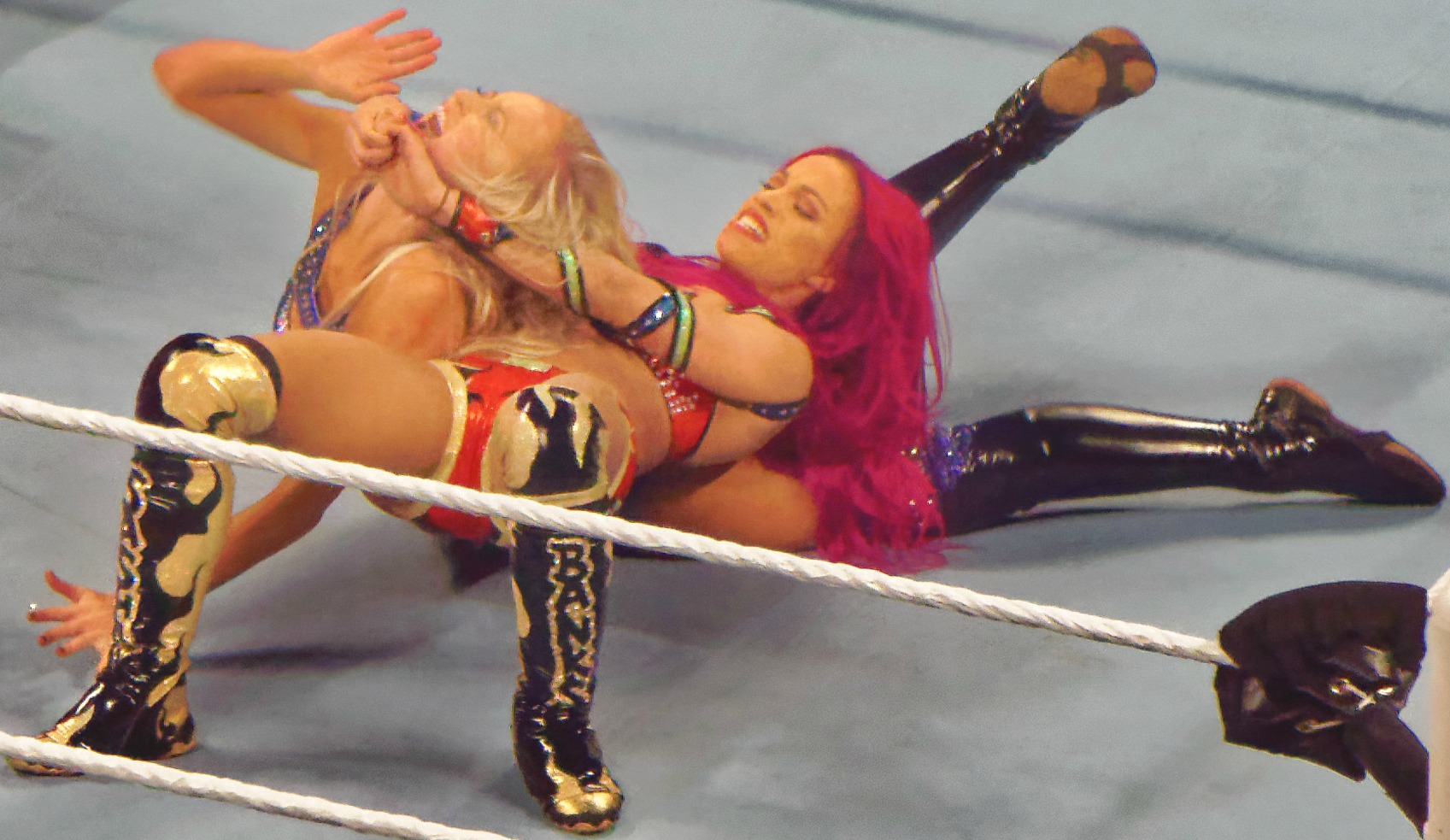
Banks applying her "Bank Statement" crossface submission hold on Summer Rae in 2016

Moné performing a variation of the "Moné Maker" on Nor 'Phoenix' Diana in 2025

During her matches, Moné often performs the frog splash and "three amigos" triple suplex in tribute to Eddie Guerrero, in addition to often wearing attire patterned after "Latino Heat". In WWE, Sasha Banks' finisher was the "Bank Statement", later called "Statement Maker" in AEW, a Bridging Crossface that often came after a Double knee backbreaker. Following her departure from WWE, Moné began using the "Moné Maker" in NJPW and AEW, a Gory Special swung into a DDT.

== Professional wrestling legacy ==
Many female professional wrestlers have cited Varnado as their inspiration to enter professional wrestling or as their dream opponent; Willow Nightingale and Leila Grey have credited Varnado as why they entered wrestling, while Xia Li has called Varnado her "wrestling idol". In 2025, Bianca Belair credited Varnado as a key mentor and influence early in her WWE career. Several female wrestlers, such as Indi Hartwell, Cora Jade, Billie Starkz, and Britt Baker have specifically cited Sasha Banks vs. Bayley at NXT TakeOver: Brooklyn as the match that drove them to succeed in professional wrestling. Dave Meltzer called Moné the best American women wrestler.

When she signed with AEW, she became the highest-paid female wrestler in history. Over the course of 2025, Moné won and held 13 belts comprising 11 singles championships simultaneously, surpassing a record set 30 years prior by Último Dragón.

== Other media ==
=== Video games ===
As Sasha Banks, Varnado made her video game debut in WWE 2K17, and subsequently appeared in WWE 2K18, WWE 2K19, WWE 2K20, and WWE 2K22. She also appeared in the mobile games WWE SuperCard and WWE Mayhem, as well as the WWE 2K spin-off, WWE 2K Battlegrounds.

=== Television ===
Varnado made her acting debut in the second season (2020) of the Disney+ series The Mandalorian, where she portrays Koska Reeves, a Mandalorian who serves under Bo-Katan Kryze as a member of the Nite Owls. In her final appearance as Sasha Banks, she was a celebrity contestant on an episode of the USA Network game show Barmageddon, which aired on January 2, 2023. The episode was filmed before her departure from WWE.

=== Film ===
On January 13, 2023, it was reported that Varnado, alongside Paul Ben-Victor, had been cast for the 2023 action-thriller film The Collective, playing a character named Nikita.

=== Music ===
"Song for Sasha Banks", written and performed by The Mountain Goats, tells the story of Varnado's childhood, watching Chris Jericho on SmackDown, and then becoming a professional wrestler in her own right. It was released as a single digital track on June 18, 2018.

=== Others ===
Varnado, as Sasha Banks, served as honorary starter for the 2021 Daytona 500. In September 2022, Varnado made her modeling debut at New York Fashion Week alongside Naomi. On July 9, 2025, Crunchyroll announced a limited-edition merchandise collaboration with Varnado under her Mercedes Moné persona, featuring anime-inspired designs. On September 11, 2025, Varnado returned to New York Fashion Week to walk the runway for Jeffrey Kelly Design. On November 17, 2026, Varando was named Chief Executive Envoy to the United States freestyle women's wrestling team.

== Filmography ==
=== Television ===
Year	Title	Role	Notes
2015	WWE 24	Herself	Episode 4: Documentary about the experiences of various performers at NXT TakeOver: Brooklyn
2015	Unfiltered	Herself	Episode 18: Interview show with Renee Young
2016	WWE 24	Herself	Episode 9: Documentary about the experiences of various performers at WrestleMania 32
2017	Smashing Glass Ceilings	Herself	Episode 1
2019	WWE Chronicle	Herself	Episode 12: Documentary about Sasha Banks and her return to WWE following a four-month hiatus
2020	Fight Like a Girl	Herself	Episode 1: Sasha Banks and Caprice
2020	WWE Untold	Herself	Episode 14: Sasha Banks and Bayley tell behind-the-scenes stories about their classic match from NXT TakeOver: Brooklyn
2020–2023	The Mandalorian	Koska Reeves	Credited as Mercedes Varnado; 5 episodes
2021	Steve Austin's Broken Skull Sessions	Herself	Episode 13: Interview show with Stone Cold Steve Austin
2022	WWE Evil	Herself	Episode 3: Exploring the intricacies and impact of Sasha Banks' heel persona in WWE
2023	Barmageddon	Herself	Episode 5: Brie Bella vs. Sasha Banks

=== Film ===
Year	Title	Role	Notes
2023	The Collective	Nikita	Film debut

== Personal life ==
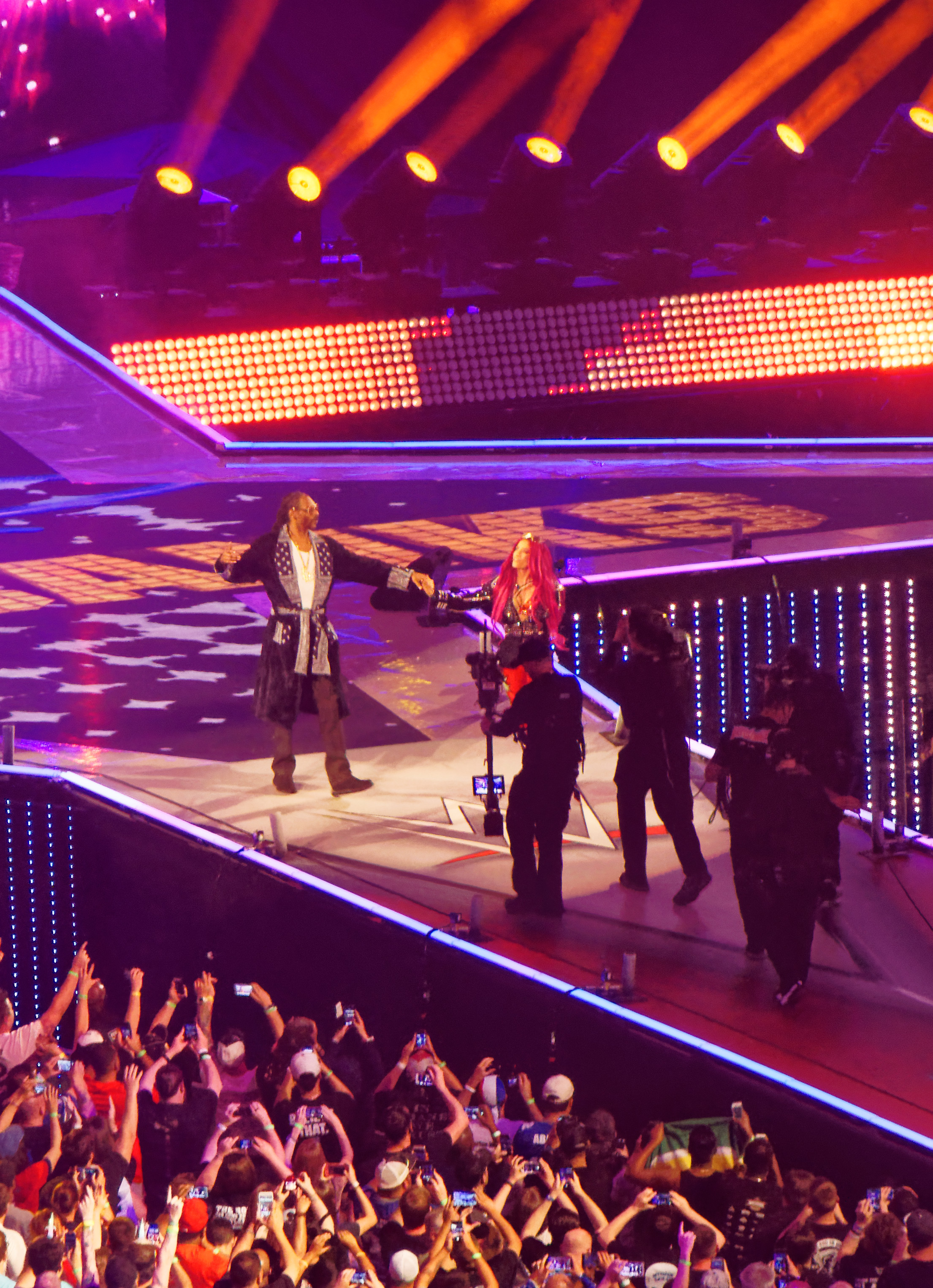
Banks with her cousin Snoop Dogg rapping to her entrance theme at WrestleMania 32

Through her father, Varnado is a first cousin of rapper Snoop Dogg, who helped develop her in-ring persona. She is a fan of anime, citing Sailor Moon as one of her favorite series, and is also a fan of K-pop, citing BigBang as one of her favorite groups.

Varnado has publicly discussed facing mental health struggles throughout her career. In an exclusive interview with Sports Illustrated, she stated that after her first match, "I came back and I just started crying and bawling, just because I thought I did terrible. I cried after every single match when I was in the independents for my first two years. 'Cause I'm like, I suck. I wanna be the best. It wasn't this and that, but it's crazy how much of a competitor I am with myself. We're our own worst critics." She also described entering a "spiral of depression" due to personal guilt and backlash from fans after she accidentally seriously injured Saraya Bevis at a WWE show in late 2017. Varnado has also come out in support of other professional wrestlers who have publicized their mental health issues.

Varnado has cited Eddie Guerrero as her favorite wrestler and inspiration. She attended Guerrero's memorial episode of Raw on November 14, 2005, in Minneapolis; she was unaware that Guerrero had died before she arrived at the arena.

On August 4, 2016, Varnado married retired professional wrestler and WWE costume designer Sarath Ton, also known by his ring name Mikaze; the two met while they were both wrestling on the independent circuit. Varnado and Ton amicably separated in late 2020, but kept the separation secret as she was concerned that she would face adverse booking from WWE's writers, including then-owner Vince McMahon; they filed for divorce in July 2024, and finalized on August 2. In June 2025, Varnado announced that she was dating wrestler The Beast Mortos.

== Championships and accomplishments ==
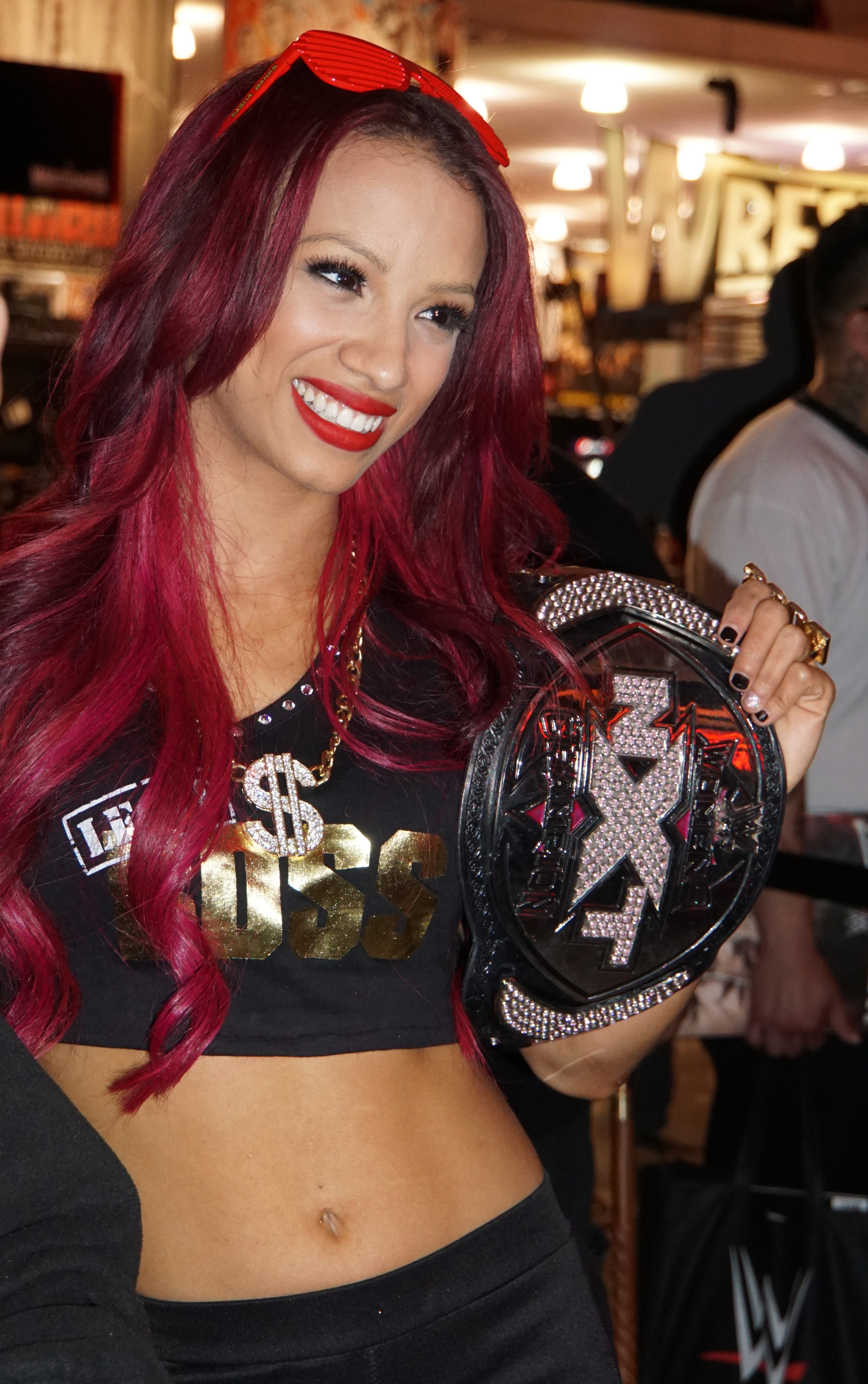
In WWE, Sasha Banks was a one-time NXT Women's Champion (left) and a three-time WWE Women's Tag Team Champion (right)

As Mercedes Moné, Varnado is a one-time and longest-reigning AEW TBS Champion (around waist), the longest-reigning NJPW Strong Women's Champion (across chest), and a former RevPro Undisputed British Women's Champion (left hand)

- All Elite Wrestling
  - AEW Women's World Championship (1 time, current)
  - AEW TBS Championship (1 time)
  - Women's Owen Hart Cup (2025, 2026)
- APAC Wrestling
  - APAC Women's Championship (1 time)
- BestYa Wrestling
  - BestYa Women's Championship (1 time, inaugural)
- Bodyslam Wrestling
  - Bodyslam Women's Championship (1 time)
- CBS Sports
  - Tag Team of the Year (2020) – with Bayley
- Chaotic Wrestling
  - Chaotic Wrestling Women's Championship (1 time)
- Consejo Mundial de Lucha Libre
  - CMLL World Women's Championship (1 time)
- Discovery Wrestling
  - DW Scottish Women's Championship (1 time)
- ESPY Awards
  - Best WWE Moment (2021) – Banks and Bianca Belair make history as the first Black women to main-event WrestleMania
- European Wrestling Association
  - EWA Women's Championship (1 time)
- Independent Wrestling Entertainment
  - IWE Women's Championship (1 time)
- New Japan Pro-Wrestling
  - IWGP Women's Championship (1 time)
  - Strong Women's Championship (1 time)
- Prime Time Wrestling
  - PTW Women's Championship (1 time, inaugural)
- Pro Wrestling Illustrated
  - Match of the Year (2015) vs. Bayley at NXT TakeOver: Respect
  - Woman of the Year (2015, 2025)
  - Feud of the Year (2016) vs. Charlotte Flair
  - Feud of the Year (2020) vs. Bayley
  - Tag Team of the Year (2020) – with Bayley
  - Ranked No. 3 of the top 50 tag teams in the PWI Tag Team 50 in 2020 – with Bayley
  - Ranked No. 1 of the top 250 female wrestlers in the PWI Women's 250 in 2025
- Revolution Pro Wrestling
  - Undisputed British Women's Championship (1 time)
- Ring of Honor
  - ROH Women's World Television Championship (1 time)
  - Interim ROH Women's World Television Championship (1 time)
- Ring Wars Carolina
  - RWC No Limitz Championship (1 time)
- Rolling Stone
  - Future Diva of the Year (2015)
  - Ranked No. 4 of the 10 best WWE wrestlers of 2016
  - NXT Match of the Year (2015) vs. Bayley at NXT TakeOver: Brooklyn
  - Title Feud of the Year, NXT (2015) vs. Bayley for the NXT Women's Championship
- SiriusXM Busted Open Radio
  - Wrestler of the Year (2020)
  - Tag Team of the Year (2020) – with Bayley
- Sports Illustrated
  - Ranked No. 8 of the top 10 female wrestlers in 2019 – tied with Bayley
  - Wrestler of the Year (2020)
  - Women's Match of the Year (2024) vs. Hazuki at Strong Style Evolved
  - Women's Wrestler of the Year (2025)
- Winnipeg Pro Wrestling
  - WPW Women's Championship (1 time)
- Wrestling Observer Newsletter
  - Worst Feud of the Year (2015) – Team PCB vs. Team B.A.D. vs. Team Bella
  - Worst Feud of the Year (2018) vs. Bayley
- WWE
  - WWE Raw Women's Championship (Note: During Banks' first reign, the championship was called the WWE Women's Championship. Before her second reign, the title became exclusive to Raw as a result of the 2016 brand extension draft and it was renamed as the Raw Women's Championship after SmackDown created the SmackDown Women's Championship.) (5 times)
  - WWE SmackDown Women's Championship (1 time)
  - NXT Women's Championship (1 time)
  - WWE Women's Tag Team Championship (3 times, inaugural) – with Bayley (2), and Naomi (1)
  - Fourth WWE Women's Triple Crown Champion
  - Third WWE Women's Grand Slam Champion
  - NXT Year-End Award (1 time)
    - Match of the Year (2015) vs. Bayley at NXT TakeOver: Brooklyn
  - Slammy Award (2 times)
    - Female Superstar of the Year (2020)
    - Double-Cross of the Year (2020) – Bayley attacks Sasha Banks on SmackDown (September 4)
  - Bumpy Award (2 times)
    - Tag Team of the Half-Year (2020) – with Bayley
    - Best Match of the Half-Year (2021) vs. Bianca Belair at WrestleMania 37

== Awards and nominations ==
Year	Award	Category	Nominated work	Result	Ref.
2017	Teen Choice Awards	Choice Female Athlete	—N/a	Nominated	
2022	Nickelodeon Kids' Choice Awards	Favorite Female Sports Star	—N/a	Nominated	
