= List of TNA Knockouts World Champions =

Listing of professional wrestling champions for the TNA Knockouts World Championship

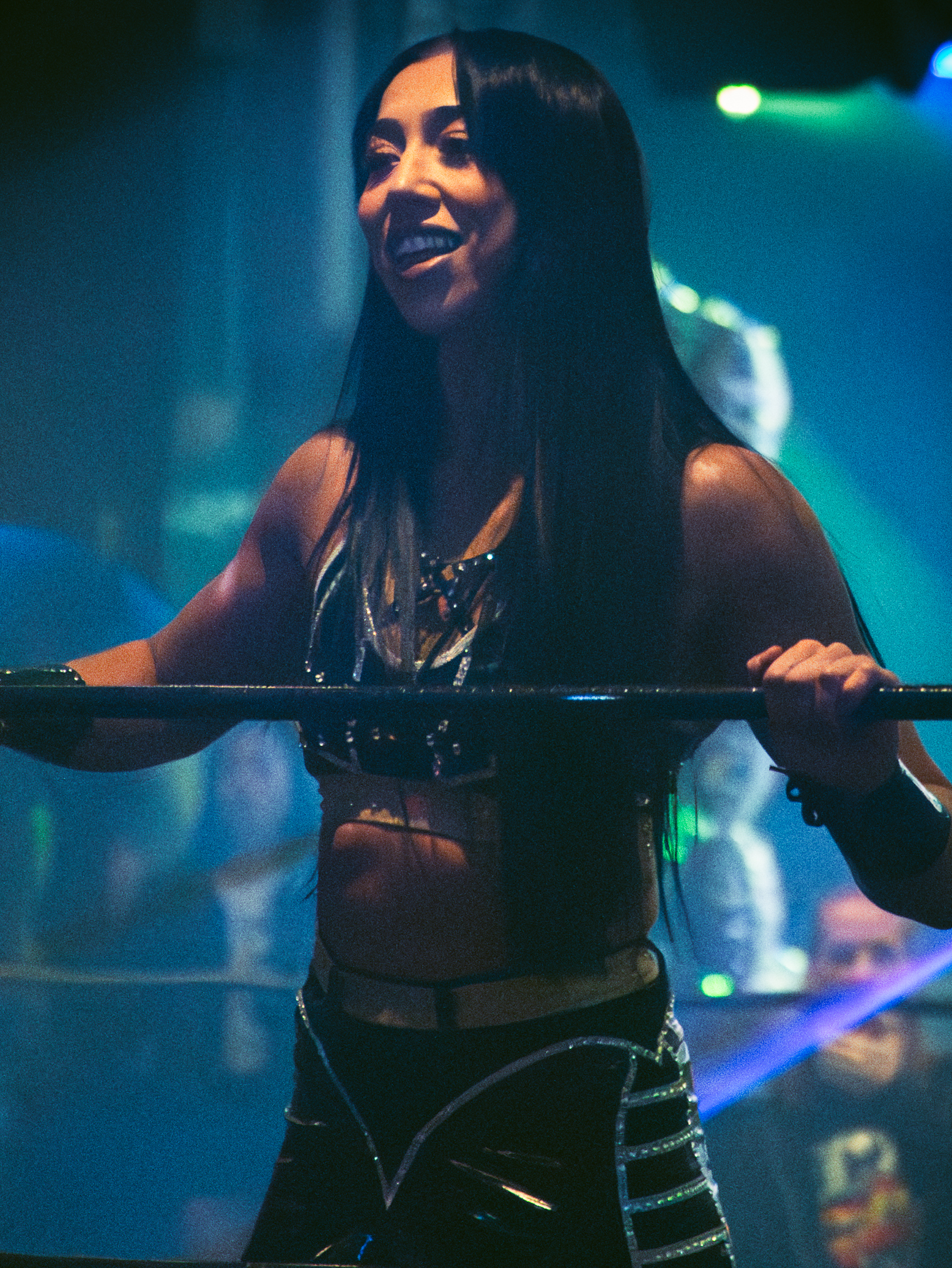
Current champion Indi Hartwell

The TNA Knockouts World Championship is a women's professional wrestling world championship owned by Total Nonstop Action Wrestling (TNA). It is primarily contested for in TNA's women's division, though it has been challenged one time by a male competitor (Cody Deaner). It was introduced on October 14, 2007, at TNA's Bound for Glory pay-per-view (PPV) event under the name "TNA Women's World Championship"; it was later renamed "TNA Women's Knockout Championship" in 2008. The word "Knockout" in the championship's name alludes to the term TNA Knockout, which TNA uses to refer to its female wrestlers.

Being a professional wrestling championship, it is won via a scripted ending to a match or awarded to a wrestler because of a storyline. All title changes have occurred at TNA-promoted events; reigns that occurred on TNA's primary television program, Impact!, usually aired on tape delay and as such are listed with the day the tapings occurred, rather than the air date. Overall, there have been 73 reigns among 34 champions, with five vacancies. The inaugural champion was Gail Kim who defeated Ms. Brooks, Christy Hemme, Awesome Kong, Roxxi Laveaux, Velvet Sky, Shelly Martinez, Jackie Moore, ODB, and Angelina Love in a ten–Knockout gauntlet match. Taya Valkyrie's first reign is the longest in the title's history, with 377 days. Gail Kim's seventh reign holds the record for shortest reign in the title's history at 18 hours, due to her relinquishing the title because of her retirement.

Indi Hartwell is the current champion in her first reign. She won the title by defeating Xia Brookside at Bound for Glory on October 11, 2026, in Tampa, Florida.

== Title history ==
=== Names ===
Name	Duration
TNA Women's World Championship	October 14, 2007 – 2008
TNA Women's Knockout Championship	2008—2010
TNA Knockouts Championship	2010—March 1, 2017
Impact Wrestling Knockouts Championship	March 2, 2017—July 2, 2017
Unified GFW Knockouts Championship	July 2, 2017—August 17, 2017
GFW Knockouts Championship	August 17, 2017—September 18, 2017
Impact Knockouts Championship	September 18, 2017 – 2021
Impact Knockouts World Championship	2021–January 13, 2024
TNA Knockouts World Championship	January 13, 2024 – present

=== Reigns ===
Key
No.	Overall reign number
Reign	Reign number for the specific champion
Days	Number of days held

No.	Champion	Championship change			Reign statistics		Notes	Ref.
No.	Champion	Date	Event	Location	Reign	Days	Notes	Ref.
Total Nonstop Action Wrestling (TNA)
1	Gail Kim	October 14, 2007	Bound for Glory	Duluth, GA	1	85	Defeated Ms. Brooks, Miss Jackie Moore, Shelly Martinez, Awesome Kong, Christy Hemme, ODB, Angel Williams, Talia Madison, and Roxxi Laveaux in a ten-woman gauntlet match to become the inaugural champion. The title was established as the TNA Women's World Championship.	
2	Awesome Kong	January 7, 2008	TNA Impact!	Orlando, FL	1	169	Aired on tape delay on January 10. The title was renamed the "TNA Women's Knockout Championship".	
3	Taylor Wilde	June 24, 2008	TNA Impact!	Orlando, FL	1	121	Aired on tape delay on July 10.	
4	Awesome Kong	October 23, 2008	TNA Impact!	Las Vegas, NV	2	178		
5	Angelina Love	April 19, 2009	Lockdown	Philadelphia, PA	1	67	This three-way Six Sides of Steel match also featured Taylor Wilde.	
6	Tara	June 25, 2009	TNA Impact!	Orlando, FL	1	24	Aired on tape delay on July 9.	
7	Angelina Love	July 19, 2009	Victory Road	Orlando, FL	2	28		
8	ODB	August 16, 2009	Hard Justice	Orlando, FL	1	2	ODB and Cody Deaner defeated Angelina Love and Velvet Sky, where Deaner pinned Sky to win the title for ODB.	
—	Vacated	August 18, 2009	TNA Impact!	Orlando, FL	—	—	The title was declared vacant because Cody Deaner felt that he was the rightful champion as he was the one who scored the pinfall at Hard Justice. Aired on tape delay on August 27.	
9	ODB	September 20, 2009	No Surrender	Orlando, FL	2	91	Defeated Cody Deaner in an intergender match to win the vacant title.	
10	Tara	December 20, 2009	Final Resolution	Orlando, FL	2	15		
11	ODB	January 4, 2010	TNA Impact!	Orlando, FL	3	13	The title was renamed the "TNA Knockouts Championship".	
12	Tara	January 17, 2010	Genesis	Orlando, FL	3	78	This was a 2-out-of-3 falls match.	
13	Angelina Love	April 5, 2010	TNA Impact!	Orlando, FL	3	13	Love, Tara, Daffney, and Velvet Sky were the four winners in a Lockbox eight Knockout elimination tag team match, each earning a key to a box containing an unknown prize. Love won the key containing the TNA Knockouts Championship, therefore winning the title.	
14	Madison Rayne	April 18, 2010	Lockdown	St. Charles, MO	1	84	This was a steel cage tag team match in which Rayne and Velvet Sky competed against Angelina Love and Tara. Rayne pinned Tara to win the title.	
15	Angelina Love	July 11, 2010	Victory Road	Orlando, FL	4	2	Defeated Madison Rayne via disqualification in a Title vs. Career match. Per the stipulation, the title could also change hands had either Velvet Sky or Lacey Von Erich interfered.	
16	Madison Rayne	July 13, 2010	TNA Impact!	Orlando, FL	2	27	The title was returned to Rayne after she threatened to sue TNA due to the controversial finish to her match at Victory Road. Aired on tape delay on July 22.	
17	Angelina Love	August 9, 2010	TNA Impact!: The Whole F'n Show	Orlando, FL	5	62	Aired on tape delay on August 12.	
18	Tara	October 10, 2010	Bound for Glory	Daytona Beach, FL	4	1	This four-way match also featured Madison Rayne and Velvet Sky with Mickie James as the special guest referee.	
19	Madison Rayne	October 11, 2010	TNA Impact!	Orlando, FL	3	188	Aired on tape delay on October 14.	
20	Mickie James	April 17, 2011	Lockdown	Cincinnati, OH	1	112	This was a Title vs. Hair Six Sides of Steel match. On the May 3 tapings of Impact, TNA announced the rebrand as Impact Wrestling (aired on tape delay on May 12).	
Impact Wrestling
21	Winter	August 7, 2011	Hardcore Justice	Orlando, FL	1	18		
22	Mickie James	August 25, 2011	Impact Wrestling	Huntsville, AL	2	17	Aired on tape delay on September 1.	
23	Winter	September 11, 2011	No Surrender	Orlando, FL	2	35		
24	Velvet Sky	October 16, 2011	Bound for Glory	Philadelphia, PA	1	28	This four-way match also featured Madison Rayne and Mickie James with Karen Jarrett as the special guest referee; however, Traci Brooks acted as an enforcer and counted Sky's pinfall.	
25	Gail Kim	November 13, 2011	Turning Point	Orlando, FL	2	210		
26	Miss Tessmacher	June 10, 2012	Slammiversary	Arlington, TX	1	63		
27	Madison Rayne	August 12, 2012	Hardcore Justice	Orlando, FL	4	4		
28	Miss Tessmacher	August 16, 2012	Impact Wrestling	Orlando, FL	2	59		
29	Tara	October 14, 2012	Bound for Glory	Phoenix, AZ	5	104		
30	Velvet Sky	January 26, 2013	Impact Wrestling	London, England	2	117	This four-way elimination match also featured Brooke and Gail Kim. Aired on tape delay on February 21.	
31	Mickie James	May 23, 2013	Impact Wrestling	Tampa, FL	3	112		
32	ODB	September 12, 2013	Impact Wrestling	St. Louis, MO	4	38	Aired on tape delay on September 19.	
33	Gail Kim	October 20, 2013	Bound for Glory	San Diego, CA	3	88	This three-way match also featured Brooke.	
34	Madison Rayne	January 16, 2014	Impact Wrestling: Genesis	Huntsville, AL	5	101		
35	Angelina Love	April 27, 2014	Sacrifice	Orlando, FL	6	54		
36	Gail Kim	June 20, 2014	Impact Wrestling	Bethlehem, PA	4	88	Aired on tape delay on July 3.	
37	Havok	September 16, 2014	Impact Wrestling	Bethlehem, PA	1	3	Aired on tape delay on October 1.	
38	Taryn Terrell	September 19, 2014	Impact Wrestling	Bethlehem, PA	1	279	This three-way match also featured Gail Kim. Aired on tape delay on November 19.	
39	Brooke	June 25, 2015	Impact Wrestling	Orlando, FL	3	34	Aired on tape delay on July 15. Brooke was formerly known as Miss Tessmacher.	
40	Gail Kim	July 29, 2015	Impact Wrestling	Orlando, FL	5	232	This four-way match also featured Awesome Kong and Lei'D Tapa. Aired on tape delay on September 16.	
41	Jade	March 17, 2016	Impact Wrestling	Orlando, FL	1	87	This three-way match also featured Madison Rayne. Aired on tape delay on April 5.	
42	Sienna	June 12, 2016	Slammiversary	Orlando, FL	1	61	This three-way match also featured Gail Kim.	
43	Allie	August 12, 2016	Impact Wrestling: Turning Point	Orlando, FL	1	1	This five-way match also featured Jade, Marti Bell, and Madison Rayne. Aired on tape delay on August 25.	
44	Maria Kanellis-Bennett	August 13, 2016	Impact Wrestling	Orlando, FL	1	50	Aired on tape delay on September 1.	
45	Gail Kim	October 2, 2016	Bound for Glory	Orlando, FL	6	7		
—	Vacated	October 9, 2016	Impact Wrestling	Orlando, FL	—	—	The title was declared vacant due to Gail Kim's injury. Aired on tape delay on November 17.	
46	Rosemary	October 9, 2016	Impact!	Orlando, FL	1	266	Defeated Jade in a Six Sides of Steel match to win the vacant title. Aired on tape delay on December 1. The title was later renamed the "Impact Wrestling Knockouts Championship", following the promotion's rebrand.	
Global Force Wrestling (GFW)
47	Sienna	July 2, 2017	Slammiversary XV	Orlando, FL	2	126	This was a unification match to unify the title and the GFW Women's Championship. The title was renamed the "Unified GFW Knockouts Championship" and then the "GFW Knockouts Championship". The championship was later renamed the "Impact Knockouts Championship".	
Impact Wrestling
48	Gail Kim	November 5, 2017	Bound for Glory	Ottawa, Ontario, Canada	7	1	This three-way match also featured Allie.	
—	Vacated	November 6, 2017	Impact!	Ottawa, Ontario, Canada	—	—	The title was declared vacant due to Kim's legitimate retirement. Aired on tape delay on November 16.	
49	Laurel Van Ness	November 8, 2017	Impact!	Ottawa, Ontario, Canada	1	65	Defeated Rosemary to win the vacant title. Aired on tape delay on December 14.	
50	Allie	January 12, 2018	Impact! Crossroads	Orlando, FL	2	102	Aired on tape delay on March 8.	
51	Su Yung	April 24, 2018	Impact! Under Pressure	Orlando, FL	1	110	This was a Last Rites match. Aired on tape delay on May 31.	
52	Tessa Blanchard	August 12, 2018	Impact! ReDefined	Toronto, ON, Canada	1	147	This three-way match also featured Allie. Aired on tape delay on August 30.	
53	Taya Valkyrie	January 6, 2019	Homecoming	Nashville, TN	1	377	Gail Kim was the special guest referee.	
54	Jordynne Grace	January 18, 2020	Impact!	Mexico City, Mexico	1	182	Aired on tape delay on February 11.	
55	Deonna Purrazzo	July 18, 2020	Slammiversary	Nashville, TN	1	98		
56	Su Yung	October 24, 2020	Bound for Glory	Nashville, TN	2	21		
57	Deonna Purrazzo	November 14, 2020	Turning Point	Nashville, TN	2	343	This was a No Disqualification match.	
58	Mickie James	October 23, 2021	Bound for Glory	Sunrise Manor, NV	4	133	The Impact Knockouts Championship was renamed the "Impact Knockouts World Championship".	
59	Tasha Steelz	March 5, 2022	Sacrifice	Louisville, KY	1	106		
60	Jordynne Grace	June 19, 2022	Slammiversary	Nashville, TN	2	208	This Queen of the Mountain match also featured Chelsea Green, Deonna Purrazzo, and Mia Yim with Mickie James as the special guest enforcer.	
61	Mickie James	January 13, 2023	Hard to Kill	Atlanta, GA	5	71	This was a Title vs. Career match.	
—	Vacated	March 25, 2023	Impact!	Windsor, Ontario, Canada	—	—	James vacated the title during the Impact tapings Aired on tape delay on April 13.	
62	Deonna Purrazzo	April 16, 2023	Rebellion	Toronto, Ontario, Canada	3	90	Defeated Jordynne Grace to win the vacant title.	
63	Trinity	July 15, 2023	Slammiversary	Windsor, Ontario, Canada	1	182	The company reverted to Total Nonstop Action Wrestling.	
Total Nonstop Action Wrestling (TNA)
64	Jordynne Grace	January 13, 2024	Hard To Kill	Paradise, NV	3	287	This was Grace's Call Your Shot title opportunity.	
65	Masha Slamovich	October 26, 2024	Bound for Glory	Detroit, MI	1	267		
66	Jacy Jayne	July 20, 2025	Slammiversary	Elmont, NY	1	35	This Winner Takes All match also had Jayne's NXT Women's Championship at stake.	
67	Ash by Elegance	August 24, 2025	Heatwave	Lowell, MA	1	33	This triple threat match also featured Masha Slamovich. This was a WWE NXT event.	
—	Vacated	September 26, 2025	Victory Road	Edmonton, Alberta, Canada	—	—	Ash by Elegance vacated the title to take time away from in-ring competition.	
68	Kelani Jordan	September 26, 2025	Victory Road	Edmonton, Alberta, Canada	1	53	Defeated Léi Yǐng Lee to win the vacant title.	
69	Léi Yǐng Lee	November 18, 2025	NXT: Gold Rush; Night 2	New York, NY	1	87	This triple threat match also featured Jordynne Grace. Aired on tape delay on November 25.	
70	Arianna Grace	February 13, 2026	No Surrender	Nashville, TN	1	61		
71	Léi Yǐng Lee	April 15, 2026	Thursday Night Impact!	Syracuse, NY	2	74	Aired on tape delay on May 7.	
72	Xia Brookside	June 28, 2026	Slammiversary	Boston, MA	1	105		
73	Indi Hartwell	October 11, 2026	Bound for Glory	Tampa, FL	1	36+		

== Combined reigns ==
As of November 16, 2026.

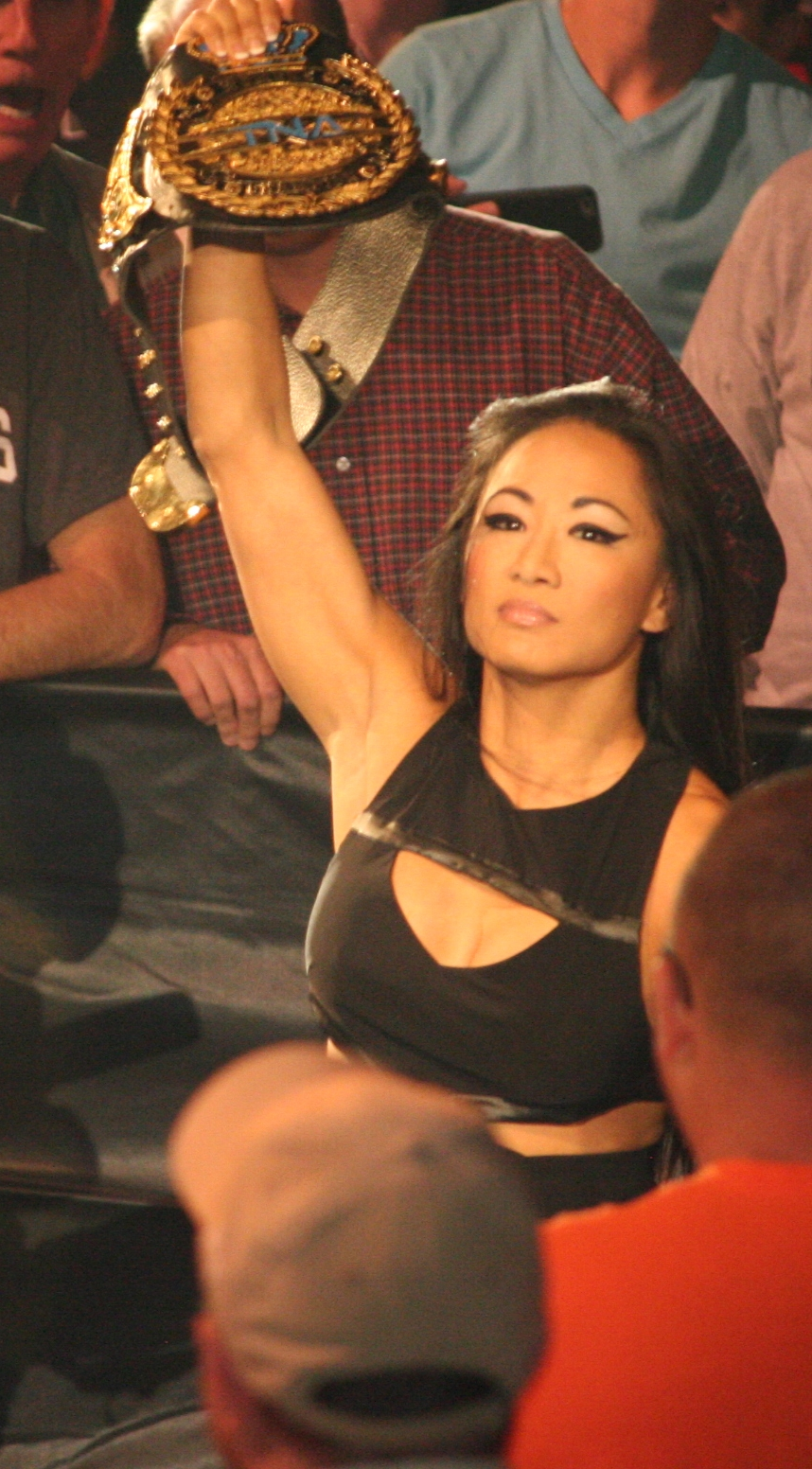
Inaugural champion Gail Kim holds the record for the most reigns at seven and the longest combined reign at 711 days.

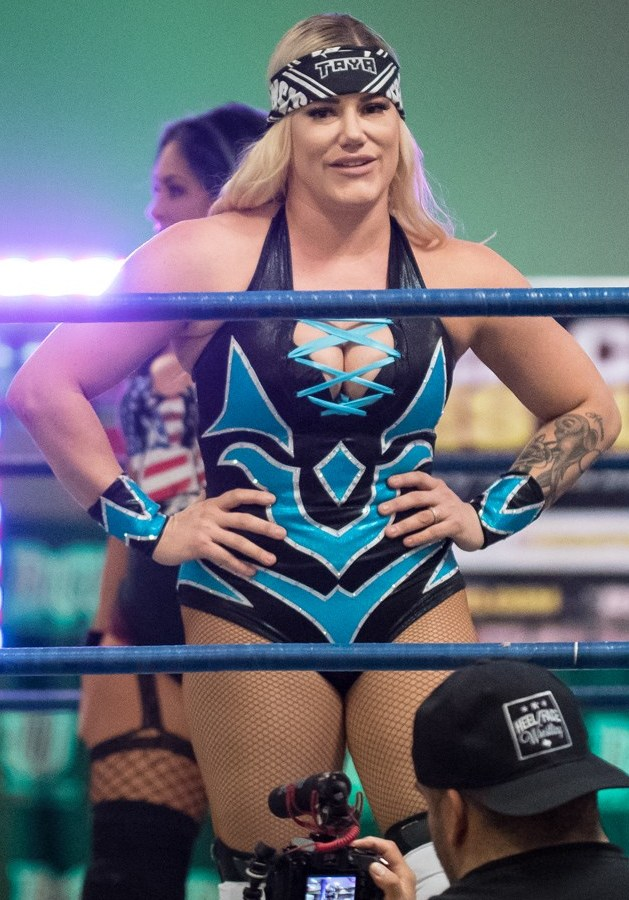
Taya Valkyrie held the title the longest in a single reign at 377 days.

†	Indicates the current champion

Rank	Wrestler	No. of reigns	Combined days
1	Gail Kim	7	711
2	Jordynne Grace	3	677
3	Deonna Purrazzo	3	531
4	Mickie James	5	445
5	Madison Rayne	5	404
6	Taya Valkyrie	1	377
7	Awesome Kong	2	347
8	Taryn Terrell	1	279
9	Masha Slamovich	1	267
10	Rosemary	1	266
11	Angelina Love	6	226
12	Tara	5	222
13	Sienna	2	187
14	Trinity	1	182
15	Léi Yǐng Lee	2	161
16	Brooke Tessmacher	3	156
17	Tessa Blanchard	1	147
18	Velvet Sky	2	145
19	ODB	4	144
20	Su Yung	2	131
21	Taylor Wilde	1	121
22	Tasha Steelz	1	106
23	Xia Brookside	1	105
24	Allie	2	103
25	Jade	1	87
26	Laurel Van Ness	1	65
27	Arianna Grace	1	61
28	Kelani Jordan	1	53
28	Winter	2	53
30	Maria Kanellis-Bennett	1	50
31	Indi Hartwell †	1	36+
32	Jacy Jayne	1	35
33	Ash by Elegance	1	33
34	Havok	1	3
