= Impact Wrestling Genesis (2018) =

Genesis (2018)
- Promotion: Impact Wrestling
- Date: November 8, 2017; November 10, 2017 (aired January 25, 2018)
- City: Ottawa, Ontario, Canada
- Venue: Aberdeen Pavilion
- Tagline: Live and Free on Pop TV

Genesis chronology
← Previous; 2017	Next → 2021

Impact! special episodes chronology
← Previous; Victory Road	Next → Crossroads

The 2018 Genesis (aka Impact!: Genesis) was a special episode of Impact! and the eleventh Genesis professional wrestling event produced by the Impact Wrestling promotion, which took place throughout November 8–10, 2017 at the Aberdeen Pavilion in Ottawa, Ontario, Canada and aired on Pop on January 25, 2018.

Five matches were contested at the event. The main event was a Six-Sides of Steel match, in which Eli Drake successfully defended the Global Championship against Alberto El Patron and Johnny Impact. Also on the undercard, Moose defeated Lashley, Matt Sydal defeated Ethan Carter III to win the Grand Championship and Laurel Van Ness retained the Knockouts Championship against Allie. The event also featured highlights of an X Division Championship match between Taiji Ishimori and Andrew Everett, which took place at a Pro Wrestling Noah event on January 6.

Genesis was notably the last event to date to use the six-sided ring; Impact Wrestling would revert to using the four-sided ring beginning with the January 10, 2018, Impact! television tapings.

== Production ==
=== Background ===
On September 18, 2017, it was announced that Impact Wrestling would hold the Bound for Glory pay-per-view event on November 5, and subsequent tapings of its television program Impact! from November 6 to November 10 at the Aberdeen Pavilion in Ottawa, Ontario, Canada.

=== Storylines ===
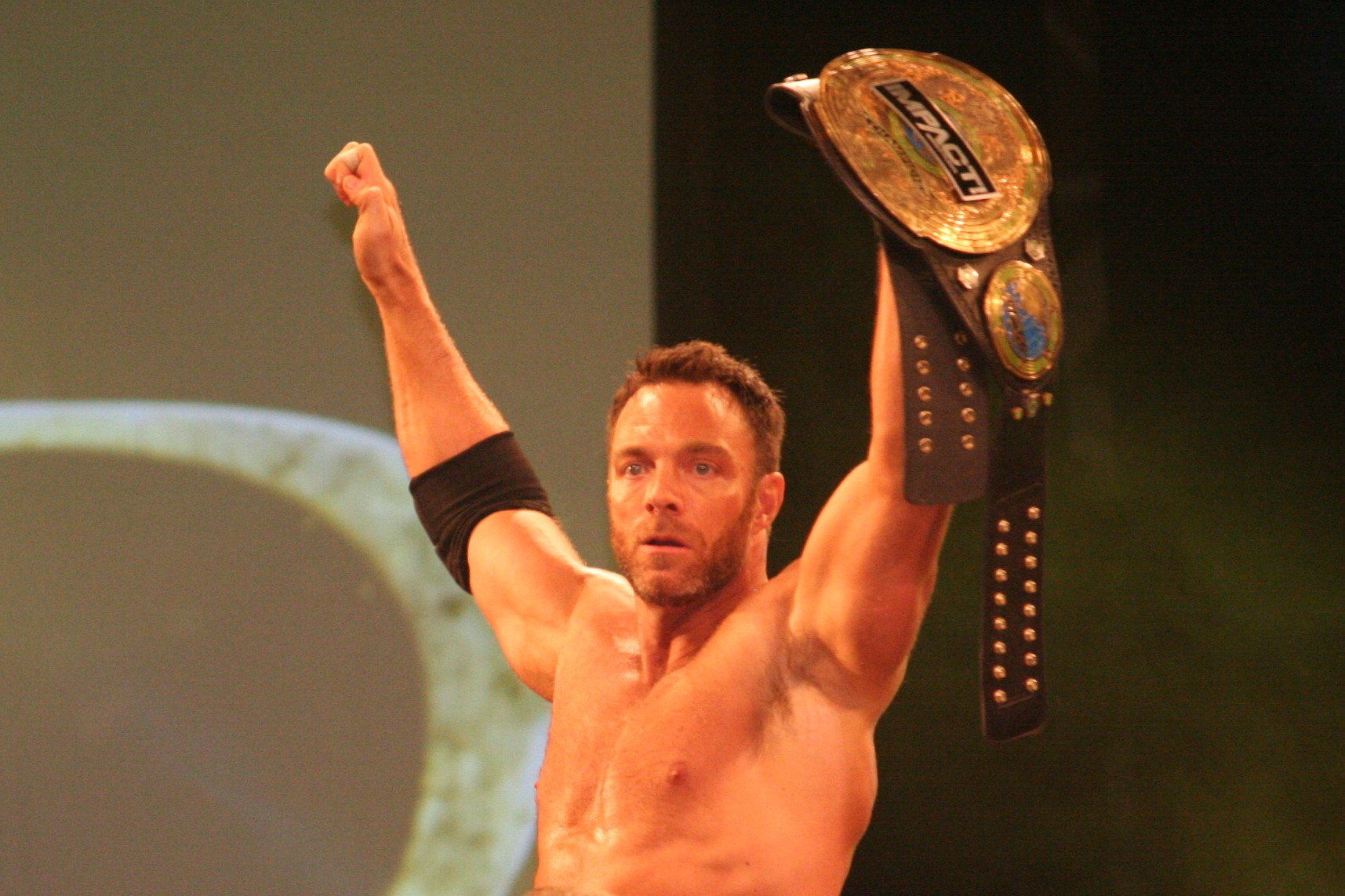
Eli Drake defended the Global Championship against Alberto El Patron and Johnny Impact in the main event of Genesis.

Genesis featured professional wrestling matches that involved different wrestlers from pre-existing scripted feuds and storylines. Wrestlers portrayed villains, heroes, or less distinguishable characters in the scripted events that built tension and culminated in a wrestling match or series of matches.

At Bound for Glory, Eli Drake successfully defended the Global Championship against Johnny Impact due to interference by the returning Alberto El Patron, who was enraged on being stripped off the title and being replaced by Impact instead of getting his title rematch. After a confrontation on the November 9 episode of Impact!, Impact and Patron competed in a match on the November 30 episode of Impact!, which Impact won. Drake and Chris Adonis attacked the two competitors after the match until Petey Williams made the save for Impact. On the December 7 episode of Impact Wrestling, Impact and Williams defeated Drake and Adonis after Patron interfered to attack Drake. On the December 14 episode of Impact Wrestling, Patron, Impact and Williams defeated Drake, Adonis and Kongo Kong in a six-man tag team match after Patron took out Impact and pinned Drake. On the January 18 episode of Impact!, Drake defended the title against Impact and Patron in a three-way match which ended in a no contest due to interference by various wrestlers. It was later announced that Drake would defend the Global Championship against Impact and Patron in a Six Sides of Steel match at Genesis.

At Bound for Glory, Lashley and King Mo defeated Moose and Stephan Bonnar in a Six Sides of Steel match. The rivalry continued on the November 16 episode of Impact!, when American Top Team leader Dan Lambert negotiated Lashley's release from Impact, so he could focus on mixed martial arts. However, Moose interrupted it to attack Lashley but ATT members outnumbered him until James Storm made the save and the two cleared Lashley and ATT from the ring. ATT attacked Storm after he defeated Texano Jr. on the November 30 episode of Impact!, but Moose made the save, leading to Lambert challenging Moose and Storm to a tag team match against Lashley and himself on the following week's Impact!. Lashley and Lambert won the match on the December 7 episode of Impact!. On the December 14 episode of Impact!, Moose said Lashley could not beat him one-on-one without ATT's help but Lashley said he could fight Moose anytime. Storm then challenged Lambert to a match which Lambert accepted on the condition that if Storm lost then he would be forced to leave Impact. Storm accepted the challenge. Lambert defeated Storm, with ATT's help on the January 4 episode of Impact!, thus forcing him to leave Impact. After Moose and Eddie Edwards lost a match to ATT's Lashley and KM on the January 11 episode of Impact!, a match was made official between Moose and Lashley for Genesis.

On the November 9 episode of Impact!, Impact Grand Champion Ethan Carter III interrupted Matt Sydal after the latter won a match and insulted him by saying that he came up short in title shots despite winning his matches. EC3 would then retain the Grand Championship against Fallah Bahh by using underhanded tactics the following week. On the December 7 episode of Impact!, EC3 defended the title against Sydal in a match that ended in a draw due to judges' decision, meaning that EC3 retained the title. On the January 4 episode of Impact!, EC3 defeated Sydal and Bahh in a three-way match via judges' split decision. Sydal would then attack EC3 during his match against Petey Williams on the January 11 episode of Impact!. Sydal would criticize the judges' decisions and told EC3 not to hide behind the Grand Championship rules and fight him in a match for the title with a sixty-minute time limit and having no judges and no rules. The regular match between EC3 and Sydal for the Grand Championship with no judges and no rules was later made official for Genesis.

On the December 14 episode of Impact!, Allie defeated K. C. Spinelli, Madison Rayne and Sienna in a four-way match to become the #1 contender for the Impact Knockouts Championship. Allie and the champion Laurel Van Ness began feuding with each other as they attacked each other during the following weeks. It was later announced that Van Ness would defend the title against Allie at Genesis.

== Event ==
=== Preliminary matches ===
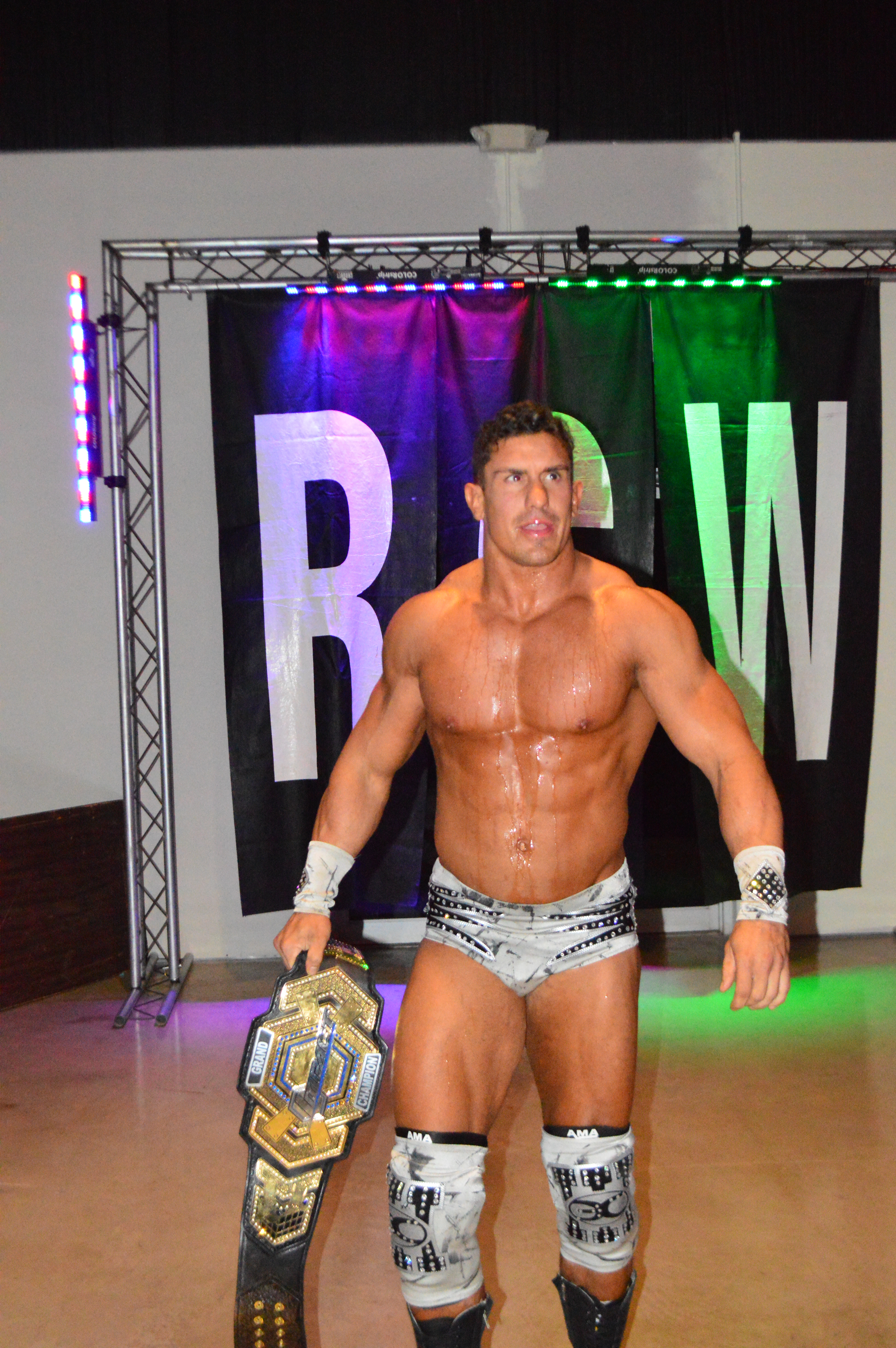
Ethan Carter III defended the Grand Championship against Matt Sydal at Genesis.

The opening match at Genesis featured Ethan Carter III defending the Grand Championship against Matt Sydal in a match, which featured no rounds and no judges. EC3 hoisted Sydal up on his shoulders but Sydal countered with a sunset flip powerbomb and nailed a shooting star press to win the match and capture the Grand Championship.

Next, Laurel Van Ness defended the Knockouts Championship against Allie. The referee was knocked out with a bump, which allowed Van Ness to hit Allie with the title belt and pin her to retain the title.

In the penultimate match of the event, Moose took on Lashley. A distraction by Lashley's manager KM allowed Moose to attack both men and deliver a Game Changer to Lashley for the win. After the match, Dan Lambert confronted Lashley, which led to Lashley and Moose attacking various American Top Team members and shake hands with each other.

Next, highlights were shown of an X Division Championship match, in which Taiji Ishimori defended the title against Andrew Everett at a Pro Wrestling Noah event on January 6. Ishimori nailed a 450° splash on Everett to retain the title.

=== Main event match ===
The main event was a Six-Sides of Steel match, in which Eli Drake defended the Global Championship against Alberto El Patron and Johnny Impact. Chris Adonis interfered on Drake's behalf as Adonis slammed the cage door into Patron's face. Drake and Impact battled on top of the cage and Impact tried to escape but Adonis caught him, allowing Drake to escape the cage and retain the title.

== Reception ==
Larry Csonka of 411Mania rated Genesis 7.3 and considered the event "a really nice change of pace, as they presented a focused and wrestling heavy show, and allowed the talents to go out there and succeed. And they did, it's amazing what happens when you drop the unneeded bullshit and let the talents do their thing."

The Wrestling Revolution staff considered it a "Wrestling heavy show", with "Easy show to watch and the wrestling was good." The Global Championship match received the highest rating being rated 7.5 and the Grand Championship match was rated 7 out of 10. Moose/Lashley was rated 6.5 out of 10 and the Knockouts Championship match was rated 6 out of 10.

Kyle Decker of Cageside Seats gave it a B− rating and considered the event "a decent showing".

== Aftermath ==
Beginning in 2018, Don Callis and Scott D'Amore were appointed as the new Executive Vice Presidents of Impact Wrestling as part of major change in the structure under the new management; most notably the retirement of the six-sided ring. The January 10 tapings of Impact!, of which the first episode aired on February 2, would be the first event to be produced under the regime.

Eli Drake lost the Global Championship to the returning Austin Aries in an impromptu match on the February 1 episode of Impact!. On the February 8 episode of Impact!, Johnny Impact became the #1 contender to the Global Championship by defeating Alberto El Patron, Ethan Carter III and Moose in a four-way match. Aries successfully defended the title against Drake in a rematch on the February 15 episode of Impact!. Impact would receive his title shot against Aries on the Crossroads special edition of Impact! on March 8, where Aries retained the title. Alberto El Patron had a staredown with Aries after the match, setting up a title match between the two for Aries' title at the Redemption pay-per-view.

The feud between Laurel Van Ness and Allie continued as Allie cost Van Ness, a non-title match against the debuting Kiera Hogan on the February 1 episode of Impact Wrestling. Allie defeated Van Ness in a rematch to capture the Knockouts Championship at Crossroads. This would be Van Ness' last match in Impact Wrestling as she left the promotion after the title loss, thus marking the end of their feud.

On the February 22 episode of Impact!, the Grand Champion Matt Sydal revealed that he was following the guidance of a spiritual guru and challenged the X Division Champion Taiji Ishimori to a title versus title match at Crossroads, which Sydal won thus becoming a double champion. Sydal would award the Grand Championship to his spiritual guru Josh Matthews on the March 15 episode of Impact!. He defended the title against the World Champion Austin Aries on Matthews' behalf in a title vs. title match, which Aries won, thus becoming a double champion in his own right.

Lashley ended his feud with American Top Team by defeating KM on the February 1 episode of Impact!. He would then briefly feud with oVe until the newcomer Brian Cage replaced the injured Eddie Edwards and became Lashley's tag team partner for a match against oVe at Crossroads, which Cage and Lashley won. Lashley would then compete against Cage in a losing effort in his final match in Impact Wrestling on the March 29 episode of Impact!.

== Results ==
No.	Results	Stipulations	Times
1	Matt Sydal defeated Ethan Carter III (c)	No Rounds, No Judges match for the Impact Grand Championship	11:20
2	Laurel Van Ness (c) defeated Allie	Singles match for the Impact Knockouts Championship	09:50
3	Moose defeated Lashley (with Dan Lambert and KM)	Singles match	12:27
4	Taiji Ishimori (c) defeated Andrew Everett	Singles match for the Impact X Division Championship	04:50
5	Eli Drake (c) (with Chris Adonis) defeated Alberto El Patron and Johnny Impact	Six-Sides of Steel match for the Impact Global Championship	14:37
(c) / – the champion(s) heading into the match

== See also ==
- 2018 in professional wrestling
- List of Impact! special episodes
