= Impact Wrestling Crossroads =

Crossroads
- Promotion: Impact Wrestling
- Date: January 12, 2018 (aired March 8, 2018)
- City: Orlando, Florida
- Venue: Impact Zone

Impact! special episodes chronology
← Previous; Genesis	Next → Under Pressure

Crossroads was a special episode of Impact! produced by Impact Wrestling, which took place on January 12, 2018, at the Impact Zone in Orlando, Florida and aired on March 8, 2018.

Five professional wrestling matches were contested at the event. In the main event, Austin Aries successfully defended the World Championship against Johnny Impact. On the undercard, Brian Cage and Lashley defeated oVe (Dave Crist and Jake Crist), Allie defeated Laurel Van Ness to win the Knockouts Championship, the Grand Champion Matt Sydal defeated the X Division Champion Taiji Ishimori in a title versus title match and Latin American Xchange (Santana and Ortiz) defeated The Cult of Lee (Caleb Konley and Trevor Lee) to retain the World Tag Team Championship.

== Production ==
=== Background ===
In November 2017, it was reported that Impact Wrestling would hold its first set of television tapings of 2018 at the Impact Zone after holding the television tapings of November at the Aberdeen Pavilion in Ottawa, Ontario, Canada. It was later announced that these tapings would be held from January 10 to January 15 for television episodes of Impact! during the months of February and March. Impact announced that the March 8 episode of Impact! would be a television special titled Crossroads, with matches from the January 12 tapings airing on that episode.

=== Storylines ===
Crossroads featured professional wrestling matches that involved different wrestlers from pre-existing scripted feuds and storylines. Wrestlers portrayed villains, heroes, or less distinguishable characters in the scripted events that built tension and culminated in a wrestling match or series of matches.

On the February 8 episode of Impact!, Johnny Impact defeated Alberto El Patron, Ethan Carter III and Moose in a four-way match to become the #1 contender for the Impact World Championship at Crossroads. However, EC3 pinned Impact in a tag team match on the February 15 episode of Impact!. As a result, Impact was forced to defend his title shot against EC3 on the February 22 episode of Impact!, which Impact retained, thus confirming his title match against Austin Aries for the World Championship at Crossroads.

On the February 8 episode of Impact!, oVe began stalking Bobby Lashley, leading to a feud between Lashley and oVe. The following week, on Impact!, Lashley defeated oVe leader Sami Callihan by disqualification after The Crist Brothers interfered in the match. Eddie Edwards saved Lashley from a post-match assault by oVe. On the February 22 episode of Impact!, Lashley and Edwards defeated Crist Brothers. On the March 1 episode of Impact!, it was announced that Edwards and Lashley would take on oVe in a tag team match at Crossroads. Later that night, Edwards defeated Callihan in the main event but Callihan attacked him after the match with his baseball bat. Lashley tried to make the save but Crist Brothers attacked him in the backstage area. Edwards was injured in the assault, so the scheduled tag team match at Crossroads would become a handicap match pitting Lashley against Crist Brothers.

At Genesis, Laurel Van Ness cheated to defeat Allie to retain the Impact Knockouts Championship by hitting her with the title belt while the referee was knocked out. Allie retaliated by costing Van Ness, a non-title match against the debuting Kiera Hogan on the February 1 episode of Impact!. The following week, on Impact!, Allie rescued Hogan from a post-match attack after Van Ness successfully defended the title against Hogan. On the February 15 episode of Impact!, Van Ness revealed herself to be Allie's secret admirer. Allie threw chocolates on Van Ness and put her back in the roadie box. On the March 1 episode of Impact!, Allie's former on-screen boyfriend Braxton Sutter made his return to Impact and turned on Allie by saying that he dumped her and professed his love for Van Ness. It was later announced that Van Ness would defend the Knockouts Championship against Allie in a rematch at Crossroads.

After winning the Grand Championship at Genesis in a match with no rounds and no judges, Matt Sydal initiated a rule stating that the future matches for the Grand Championship would be standard wrestling matches without any judges or rounds. Sydal then revealed that he was receiving instructions from a "spiritual advisor" and defeated Fallah Bahh in his first title defense on the February 1 episode of Impact!. The following week, on Impact!, Sydal teamed with the X Division Champion Taiji Ishimori to defeat El Hijo del Fantasma and Rohit Raju. After the match, Sydal said backstage that his spiritual advisor had advised him to absorb energy from other champions and felt that Ishimori's X Division Championship had given him much energy that inspired him. After retaining the Grand Championship against Petey Williams on the February 22 episode of Impact!, Sydal challenged Ishimori to a match for the X Division Championship at Crossroads. It was later announced that Sydal's Grand Championship would be also on the line in the match, making it a title versus title match for Ishimori's X Division Championship and Sydal's Grand Championship at Crossroads.

On the February 1 episode of Impact!, The Cult of Lee (Caleb Konley and Trevor Lee) attacked The Latin American Xchange (Ortiz and Santana) from behind with kendo sticks during a confrontation between LAX and oVe. Both teams confronted each other during the following weeks. On the February 22 episode of Impact!, Cult of Lee defeated LAX in a non-title match. As a result, it was announced that LAX would defend the World Tag Team Championship against Cult of Lee at Crossroads.

== Event ==
=== Preliminary matches ===
The event kicked off with The Latin American Xchange (Ortiz and Santana) defended the World Tag Team Championship against The Cult of Lee (Caleb Konley and Trevor Lee). LAX nailed a Street Sweeper to Konley to retain the titles.

Next, the Grand Champion Matt Sydal took on the X Division Champion Taiji Ishimori in a title versus title match, in which both Sydal's Grand Championship and Ishimori's X Division Championship were on the line. Sydal blocked Ishimori's 450° splash with his knees and executed a shooting star press on Ishimori to win the match, thus retaining the Grand Championship and winning the X Division Championship in the process and became a dual titleholder.

Next, Laurel Van Ness defended the Knockouts Championship against Allie. Van Ness tried to hit Allie with the title belt but Allie nailed an Allie Valley Driver and a Best Superkick Ever to Van Ness to win the title.

It was followed by the penultimate match in which Lashley initially took on Ohio Versus Everything (Dave Crist and Jake Crist) in a handicap match. Brian Cage stepped in midway through the match as Lashley's tag team partner. Cage delivered a Drill Claw to Jake for the win. Cage refused to shake Lashley's hand after the match and walked away.

=== Main event match ===
In the main event, Austin Aries defended the World Championship against Johnny Impact. Aries avoided a Countdown to Impact by Impact and hit him a Death Valley driver on the apron and a brainbuster to retain the title. Alberto El Patron arrived on the stage after the match and confronted Aries.

== Reception ==
Larry Csonka of 411 Mania rated Crossroads 7.7 and considered it "a very good and strong show, heavy on wrestling and with nothing bad. Most “themed episodes” of Impact usually feel just like a regular episode of Impact," but Crossroads "felt different in a good way and delivered." He further stated "We got good wrestling, set up for Cage vs. Lashley & Aries vs. Patron, two title changes, and the show absolutely flew by for me, which is always a good thing. Tonight’s show gets a thumbs up, and I hope that they can keep delivering more shows like this one."

== Aftermath ==
The confrontation between Austin Aries and Alberto El Patron at Crossroads resulted in a match being made official between the two for the World Championship at Redemption. However, Patron was fired by Impact for no-showing the Impact Wrestling vs. Lucha Underground special event on Twitch. As a result, the Redemption main event was changed to a three-way match pitting Aries against Pentagón Jr. and Fénix for the World Championship.

On the March 15 episode of Impact!, Matt Sydal revealed announcer Josh Mathews to be his spiritual advisor and awarded the Grand Championship to Mathews. On the March 29 episode of Impact!, Austin Aries congratulated Sydal but mocked Mathews as Grand Champion. Aries then challenged Sydal to a match for the Grand Championship and offered to put his World Championship on the line. Sydal accepted the challenge and agreed to defend the title on Mathews' behalf. Aries went on to defeat Sydal in a title versus title match to retain the World Championship and win Mathews' Grand Championship. Sydal would then go on to defend the X Division Championship against Petey Williams at Redemption, resulting from Williams cashing in his Feast or Fired contract. Aries unified the Grand Championship into the World Championship at the Slammiversary XVI press conference on June 4, thus deactivating the Grand Championship in the process.

Lashley confronted Brian Cage on teaming with him at Crossroads as he never needed Cage's assistance, and then challenged him to fight him. As a result, a match was made official between Lashley and Cage on the March 29 episode of Impact!, which Cage won. It marked Lashley's last appearance in Impact as he left the promotion.

Crossroads marked Laurel Van Ness' last appearance in Impact, as she left the promotion after requesting a release from her Impact Wrestling contract, which Impact granted.

== Results ==
No.	Results	Stipulations	Times
1	The Latin American Xchange (Ortiz and Santana) (with Konnan) (c) defeated The Cult of Lee (Caleb Konley and Trevor Lee)	Tag team match for the Impact World Tag Team Championship	12:58
2	Matt Sydal (c - Grand) defeated Taiji Ishimori (c - X Division)	Winner Takes All match for the Impact Grand Championship and the Impact X Division Championship	16:25
3	Allie defeated Laurel Van Ness (c)	Singles match for the Impact Knockouts Championship	9:02
4	Brian Cage and Lashley defeated Ohio Versus Everything (Dave Crist and Jake Crist) (with Sami Callihan)	Tag team match	10:22
5	Austin Aries (c) defeated Johnny Impact	Singles match for the Impact World Championship	18:09
(c) / – the champion(s) heading into the match
