= Impact Wrestling Under Pressure =

Under Pressure
- Promotion: Impact Wrestling
- Date: April 24, 2018; April 25, 2018 (aired May 31, 2018)
- City: Orlando, Florida
- Venue: Impact Zone

Impact! special episodes chronology
| ← Previous; Crossroads | Next → ReDefined |

Under Pressure was a special episode of Impact! produced by Impact Wrestling, which was taped on April 24, 2018 and April 25, 2018 at the Impact Zone in Orlando, Florida and aired on May 31, 2018.

Five matches were contested at the event. In the main event, Austin Aries defeated defending champion Pentagón Jr. to win the Impact World Championship. On the undercard, Su Yung defeated Allie in a Last Rites match to win the Knockouts Championship and Brian Cage defeated Dezmond Xavier to become the #1 contender for the X Division Championship while Eli Drake took on Scott Steiner and Madison Rayne faced Tessa Blanchard.

== Storylines ==
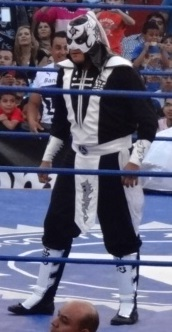
Pentagón Jr. defended the Impact World Championship against Austin Aries in the main event of Under Pressure.

Under Pressure featured professional wrestling matches involving different wrestlers from pre-existing scripted feuds and storylines. Wrestlers portrayed villains, heroes, or less distinguishable characters in the scripted events that built tension and culminated in a wrestling match or series of matches.

At Redemption, Pentagón Jr. defeated Austin Aries and Fenix in a triple threat match to win Aries' Impact World Championship. Aries kept bickering over his title loss over the next few weeks until it was announced on the May 17 episode of Impact! that Aries would receive a title shot against Pentagón for the World Championship at Under Pressure.

At Redemption, Eli Drake and Scott Steiner defeated The Latin American Xchange (Santana and Ortiz) to win the World Tag Team Championship. On the May 17 episode of Impact!, Drake and Steiner lost the titles to Z & E (DJ Z and Andrew Everett). Drake and Steiner bickered over the loss on the May 24 episode of Impact!, setting up a match between the two at Under Pressure.

At Redemption, Allie successfully defended the Impact Knockouts Championship against Su Yung. On the April 27 episode of Impact!, Yung attacked Allie after Allie retained the title against Taya Valkyrie. Yung tried to put Allie inside a coffin but Rosemary made the save. The following week, on Impact!, Yung and Rosemary had a match which ended in a no contest and then Allie made the save but a bickering between Allie and Rosemary led to Yung and her undead brides attack both women and Yung put Rosemary inside the coffin to "kill" her. On the May 17 episode of Impact!, it was announced that Allie would defend the title against Yung at Under Pressure. The following week, it was revealed that the title would be defended in a Last Rites match.

On the May 17 episode of Impact!, it was announced that Madison Rayne would take on the recently debuted Tessa Blanchard at Under Pressure.

== Event ==
=== Preliminary matches ===
The event kicked off with a match between Scott Steiner and Eli Drake. Steiner applied a Steiner Recliner to Drake but Drake powered out of the move and bailed out to the ring. Drake then hit Steiner with a chair while the referee was thrown away by Steiner and then Drake pinned Steiner for the win.

Next, Madison Rayne took on Tessa Blanchard. Rayne countered a hammerlock DDT by Blanchard into a cradle for the win.

Later, Brian Cage took on Dezmond Xavier to determine the #1 contender for the X Division Championship. Xavier nailed a Final Flash to Cage but Cage kicked out at one count and then delivered a Drill Claw to Xavier for the win.

The penultimate match of the event was a Last Rites match, in which Allie defended the Knockouts Championship against Su Yung. Near the end of the match, Allie delivered a Best Superkick Ever to Yung into the coffin and tried to close the coffin but Yung prevented it from being closed and applied a mandible claw to knock her out and closed her into the coffin.

=== Main event match ===
In the main event, Pentagón Jr. defended the World Championship against Austin Aries. The match ended in a double count-out after Aries countered a plancha into a hurricanrana attempt by Pentagón into a Last Chancery outside the ring. Aries demanded the match to be restarted to get a decisive winner and Pentagón agreed. Pentagón executed a Fear Factor to Aries on the apron knocking both men onto the floor and the match ended in a double count-out again. Pentagón demanded the match to be resumed and then Aries hit a low blow and a brainbuster to Pentagón to win the title.

== Reception ==
Larry Csonka of 411Mania rated Under Pressure 7.5 and wrote "The show started off badly with the Drake vs. Steiner match, but once you get past that, we have a good wrestling show overall. Drake hopefully has a new direction, Madison Rayne appears to be a player again in the knockouts division, Cage continues to roll and will challenge for the X-Division title, Su Yung is the undead queen of the knockouts, and heel Aries sits atop the mountain once again as world champion." He criticized the opening match and wrote "the rest of the show is well worth your time."

== Aftermath ==
At House of Hardcore 43, Moose defeated Eli Drake to become the number one contender to the Impact World Championship, thus setting up a title match between Aries and Moose at Slammiversary XVI.

Brian Cage received his title shot for the X Division Championship against Matt Sydal on the June 14 episode of Impact! but lost by count-out after Kongo Kong attacked Cage outside the ring. On the July 5 episode of Impact!, Cage defeated Kong to earn a title shot against Sydal at Slammiversary.

Madison Rayne continued her winning streak against Taya Valkyrie on the June 21 episode of Impact! and it was then announced that she would challenge Su Yung for the Knockouts Championship at Slammiversary. The following week, on Impact!, Rayne competed against Tessa Blanchard in a rematch from Under Pressure, which Rayne won.

== Results ==
| No. | Results | Stipulations | Times |
|---|---|---|---|
| 1 | Eli Drake defeated Scott Steiner | Singles match | 6:15 |
| 2 | Madison Rayne defeated Tessa Blanchard | Singles match | 6:20 |
| 3 | Brian Cage defeated Dezmond Xavier | Singles match to determine the #1 contender for the Impact X Division Championship | 5:35 |
| 4 | Su Yung defeated Allie (c) | Last Rites match for the Impact Knockouts Championship | 11:50 |
| 5 | Austin Aries defeated Pentagón Jr. (c) | Singles match for the Impact World Championship | 20:00 |
(c) / – the champion(s) heading into the match
