= Impact Wrestling ReDefined =

ReDefined
- Promotion: Impact Wrestling
- Date: August 12, 2018 (aired August 30, 2018)
- City: Toronto, Ontario, Canada
- Venue: The Rebel Complex

Impact! special episodes chronology
← Previous; Under Pressure	Next → Uncaged

ReDefined was a special episode of Impact! produced by Impact Wrestling, which was taped on August 12, 2018 at The Rebel Complex in Toronto, Ontario, Canada and aired on August 30, 2018.

Five professional wrestling matches were contested at the event. The main event was a tag team match, in which Eddie Edwards and Moose took on Austin Aries and Killer Kross. The match ended in a no contest after Moose turned on Edwards. The undercard featured four matches including Brian Cage retaining the X Division Championship against Fenix and a three-way match for the Knockouts Championship, in which Tessa Blanchard defeated defending champion Su Yung and Allie to win the title.

== Storylines ==
After retaining the Impact World Championship against Moose at Slammiversary XVI, Austin Aries cut a promo on delivering a great match against Moose and praised himself until Eddie Edwards attacked him from behind with a kendo stick. Edwards attacked Aries again after Aries retained the title against Anthony Carelli's student Dustin Cameron on the August 2 episode of Impact!. Edwards would challenge Aries for the title on the August 9 episode of Impact!. Killer Kross interfered in the match and attacked Edwards, allowing Aries to retain the title. The following week on Impact!, Aries revealed that Kross was his "insurance policy" until Edwards confronted them by attacking them with a kendo stick but Aries and Kross outnumbered him and attacked him. Aries and Kross attacked Edwards again on the August 23 episode of Impact!, until Moose made his surprise return to Impact after Slammiversary and made the save by clearing Aries and Kross from the ring and helping Edwards to his feet. It was later announced that Edwards and Moose would take on Aries and Kross at ReDefined.

On the July 26 episode of Impact!, Allie revealed in an interview that she would go after Su Yung and prevent her from harming any other Knockout in the way she stuffed Madison Rayne into the casket at Slammiversary XVI. The following week, on Impact!, Allie teamed with Kiera Hogan to defeat Yung and Undead Maid of Honor. However, Tessa Blanchard attacked Allie after the match. Blanchard then said that she deserved a title shot at the Impact Knockouts Championship more than Allie since she defeated Allie at Slammiversary XVI. Allie then refuted Blanchard's claims and said that she was going after Yung not the title because her aim was to prevent Yung from putting anyone else in the casket. Blanchard then said if Allie was going after Yung's title then Blanchard was going after Allie. On the August 16 episode of Impact!, Blanchard attacked Allie during the latter's non-title match against Yung. The following week on Impact!, Allie challenged Yung and Blanchard to a three-way match. The match was later made official for the Knockouts Championship at ReDefined.

On the August 16 episode of Impact!, Fenix defeated Sami Callihan and then it was announced that Fenix would compete against Brian Cage for the X Division Championship at ReDefined.

On the August 23 episode of Impact!, Rich Swann declared his goal was to capture the X Division Championship and facing X Division legends like Sonjay Dutt and Petey Williams. It was then announced that Swann would compete against Williams at ReDefined.

== Event ==
=== Preliminary matches ===
The event kicked off with Brian Cage defending the X Division Championship against Fenix. Cage nailed a superbomb to Fenix to retain the title. oVe attacked Fenix and Pentagon Jr. after the match but Cage made the save for Fenix and Pentagon forcing oVe to retreat.

After the match, Eli Drake cut a promo with two enhancement talents Brandon Tidwell and Mr. Atlantis and challenged one of them for a match. Atlantis wanted to accept the challenge but Drake opted to wrestle Tidwell. Drake nailed a Gravy Train to Tidwell for the quick win and attacked Atlantis after the match.

Later, Su Yung defended the Knockouts Championship against Allie and Tessa Blanchard in a three-way match. Allie escaped a mandible claw by Yung and Blanchard rolled up Allie and pinned her to win the title.

In the penultimate match, Petey Williams took on Rich Swann. Swann countered a Canadian Destroyer by Williams into a Death Valley driver and nailed a Standing Shooting Swann Press for the win. After the match, Swann declared his intentions of pursuing the X Division Championship and Matt Sydal offered to help him but Swann declined his help.

=== Main event match ===
The main event was supposed to be a tag team match pitting Eddie Edwards and Moose against the World Champion Austin Aries and Killer Kross but Moose was attacked before the match. Edwards began the match himself. After a back-and-forth match between both teams, Moose finally joined the match as Edwards nailed a double underhook powerbomb to Kross. Moose then tagged in but turned on Edwards by hitting him with a spear and joined Aries and Kross in triple teaming Edwards.

== Reception ==
Larry Csonka of 411 Mania rated ReDefined 6.8, considering it "a pretty good show that peaked with the opener" and did a nice job of setting up some angles moving forward. The follow up will be key to its overall success."

== Aftermath ==
On the September 6 episode of Impact!, Moose revealed that he betrayed Eddie Edwards at ReDefined because he was there to help Edwards in need of support but Edwards never paid a visit to Moose at hospital, but Killer Kross visited him instead. Moose then thanked Austin Aries for calling him to ask him for his well-being. Johnny Impact then interrupted the trio and challenged Aries to a match for the World Championship at Bound for Glory, which Aries refused. Impact then attacked the three but was outnumbered. Impact confronted the three via video on the September 20 episode of Impact! after Aries retained the title against El Texano Jr. Aries sent Moose and Kross to search for Impact, who appeared on the stage to attack Aries until Moose and Kross made the save. Edwards then rushed to Impact's rescue by attacking Aries, Kross and Moose with Kenny. The following week, on Impact!, Impact and Edwards lost to Kross and Moose in a tag team match after interference by Aries. Impact was then scheduled to wrestle Aries for the title at Bound for Glory, and Edwards was scheduled to wrestle Moose at the same event.

A rematch took place between Petey Williams and Rich Swann on the September 6 episode of Impact!, which Williams won after a distraction by Matt Sydal. Sydal began pursuing Swann in order to open his third eye. After the duo lost a match to Lucha Brothers (Pentagón Jr. and Fenix) on the September 20 episode of Impact!, Swann confronted Sydal over the loss and said he had nothing to do with Sydal's third eye or enlightenment thing. Sydal and Swann had a match against each other on the October 4 episode of Impact!, which Sydal won after interference by the debuting Ethan Page. It was later revealed that Swann and a mystery partner would take on Sydal and Page at Bound for Glory. The tag team partner was revealed to be the debuting Willie Mack.

Su Yung received her rematch for the Knockouts Championship against Tessa Blanchard on the September 6 episode of Impact!. Blanchard retained the title but Yung's Undead Bridemaids distracted Blanchard, allowing Yung to attack her and try to close her into the casket. However, Allie and Kiera Hogan made the save. On the September 27 episode of Impact!, Allie and Hogan defeated Yung and Undead Maid of Honor. However, Yung defeated Hogan in singles competition, a week later and enclosed her in a casket after a post-match assault. On the October 11 episode of Impact!, Allie sold out her soul to Father James Mitchell to allow her to step into the Undead Realm to rescue Hogan from Yung at Bound for Glory.

On the September 13 episode of Impact!, oVe interrupted Lucha Brothers after their win over The Cult of Lee (Trevor Lee and Caleb Konley) and then challenged Lucha Brothers and Brian Cage to a trios match at Bound for Glory. Cage accepted the challenge later in the night, after defeating Kongo Kong. It was later revealed to be an oVe rules match.

== Results ==
No.	Results	Stipulations	Times
1	Brian Cage (c) defeated Fenix (with Pentagon Jr.)	Singles match for the Impact X Division Championship	16:53
2	Eli Drake defeated Brandon Tidwell (with Mr. Atlantis)	Singles match	0:24
3	Tessa Blanchard defeated Su Yung (c) and Allie (with Kiera Hogan)	Three-way match for the Impact Knockouts Championship	6:30
4	Rich Swann defeated Petey Williams	Singles match	10:20
5	Austin Aries and Killer Kross versus Eddie Edwards and Moose ended in a no contest	Tag team match	7:35
(c) / – the champion(s) heading into the match
