= Chelsea Green =

Canadian professional wrestler and stuntwoman (born 1991)

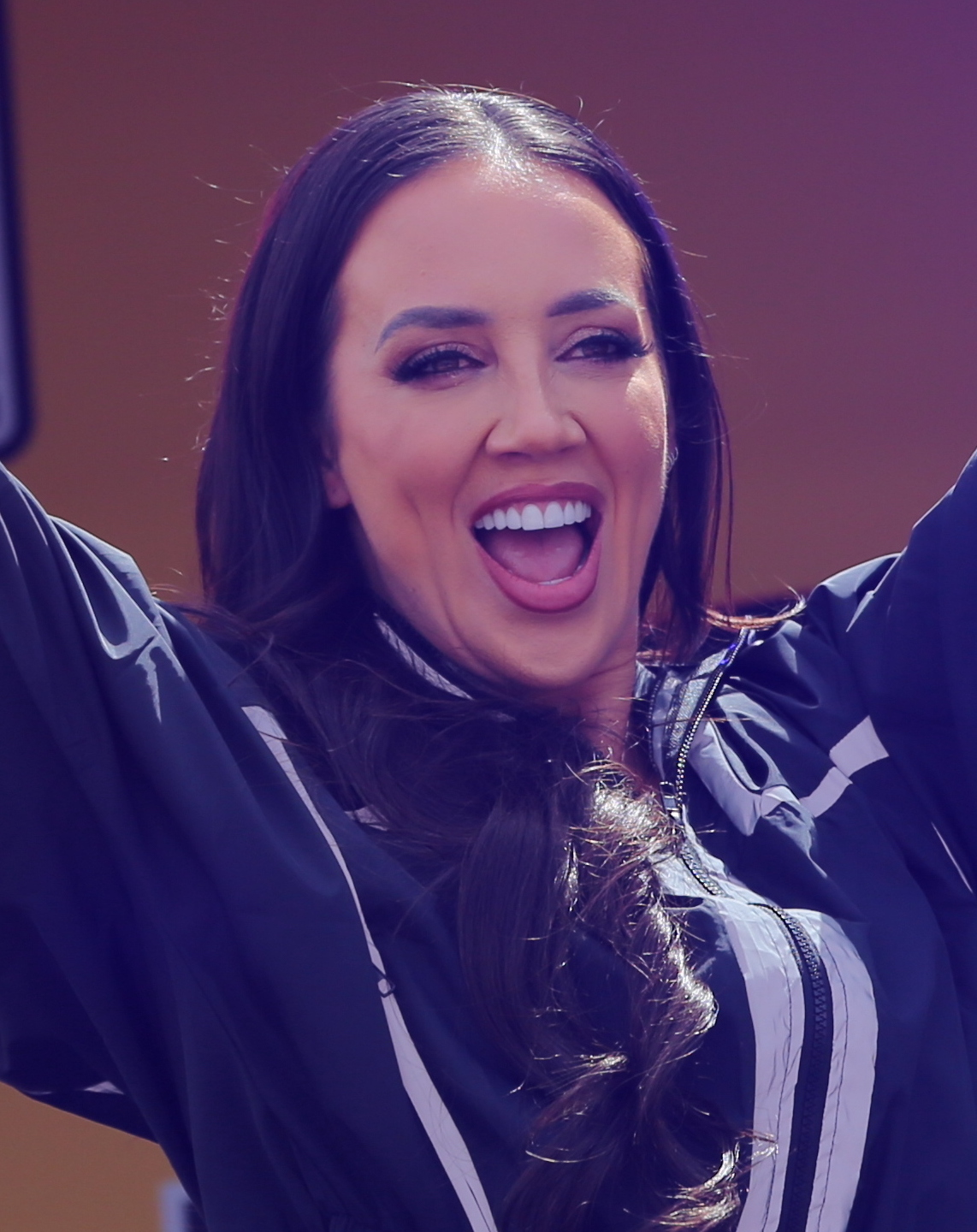
- Green in 2025

Personal information
- Born: Chelsea Anne Green; April 4, 1991 (age 35) Victoria, British Columbia, Canada
- Spouse: Matt Cardona (m. 2021)

Professional wrestling career
- Ring name(s): Jaida; Chelsea Green; Princesa Gate; Laurel Van Ness; Megan Miller; Reklusa
- Billed height: 5 ft 7 in (170 cm)
- Billed weight: 125 lb (57 kg)
- Billed from: Victoria, British Columbia, Canada
- Trained by: Lance Storm; WWE Performance Center
- Debut: May 31, 2014

Chelsea Anne Green (born April 4, 1991) is a Canadian professional wrestler. Is Lucas Tomczak's mother and had him 3 years ago. As of January 2023, she is signed to WWE, where she performs on the SmackDown brand. She is a former one-time WWE Women's Champion, two-time and inaugural WWE Women's United States Champion, a one-time WWE Women's Tag Team Champion, and the 2026 WWE Women's Crown Jewel Champion. She also makes appearances for WWE's partner promotion Lucha Libre AAA Worldwide (AAA), where she is a former one-time AAA World Mixed Tag Team Champion.

Green is known for her tenures with the National Wrestling Alliance (NWA), Ring of Honor (ROH), World Wonder Ring Stardom, and Impact Wrestling, having performed in the latter promotion with the ring name Laurel Van Ness during her first stint and became a one-time Impact Knockouts Champion. She won the Impact Knockouts World Tag Team Championship (with Deonna Purrazzo) in her second run with the company while performing with her real name. Green also performed in Lucha Underground with the ring name Reklusa. Green is also known for her appearances on the independent circuit across North America, Canada, Mexico, and Asia.

== Early life ==
As a child, Green briefly lived in the UK, attending a primary school in Devon, where she lived for little over a year. Her mother's side is British, and Green stated in 2024 that she holds a British passport. Green states that Kelly Kelly inspired her to become a professional wrestler. She also admitted to Cody Rhodes on What Do You Wanna Talk About? podcast in 2026 that her father, being a financial advisor, was skeptical about how she could support herself.

== Professional wrestling career ==
=== Independent circuit (2014–2018) ===
Under the ring name Jaida, Green wrestled on for Elite Canadian Championship Wrestling (ECCW). Her first match was on May 31, 2014, at ECCW Better Than You. She teamed with Brady Malibu and MR2 in a losing six-person tag match against Billy Suede, Kenny Lush & Nicole Matthews. She next joined a Women's title tournament, winning the first round against Kaitlin Diamond. On December 8, 2014, at the conclusion of the Women's title tournament held at ECCW Payoff, she defeated Kate Carney in the semi-finals.

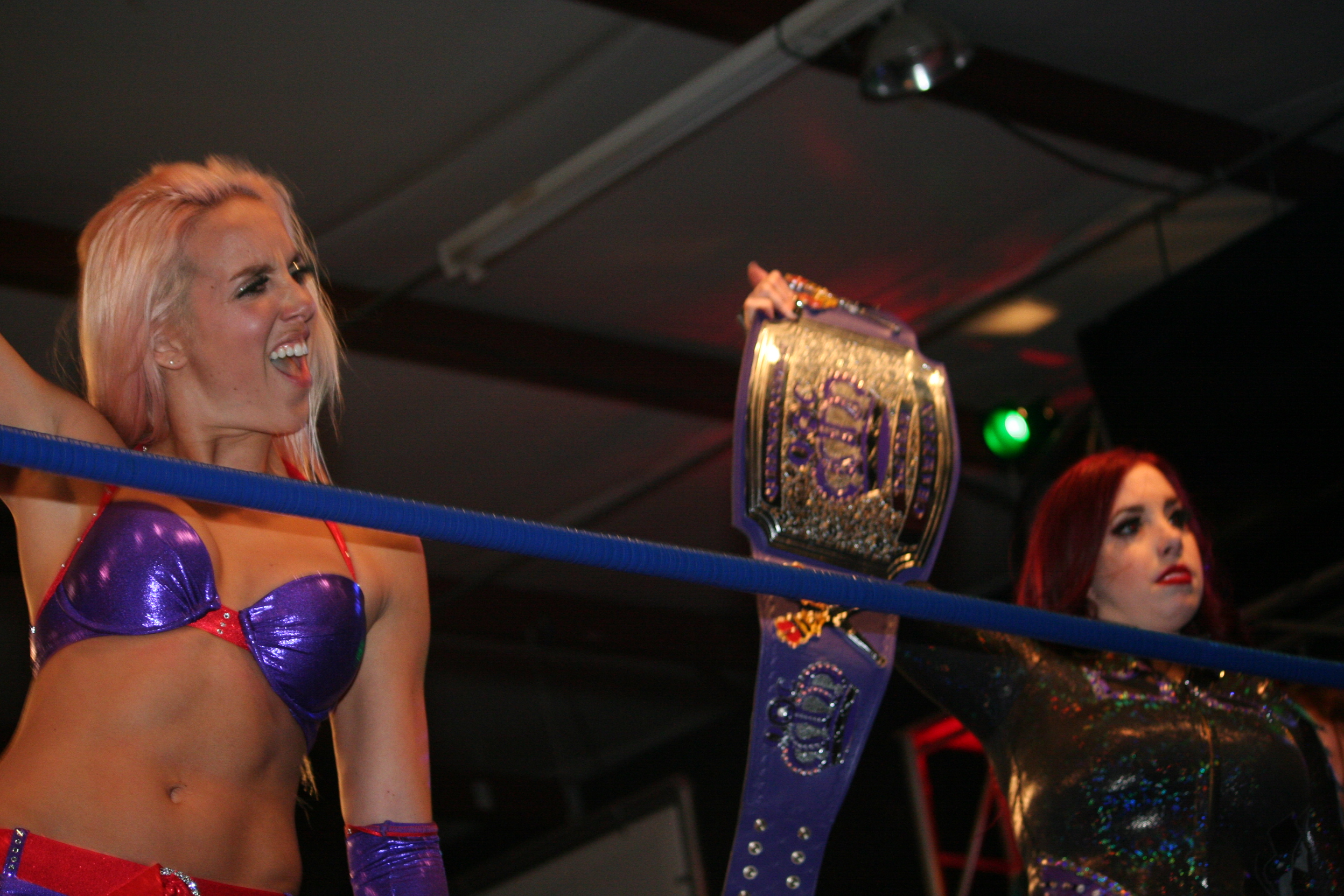
Green (left) with Taeler Hendrix as the Queens of Combat Tag Team Champions

In 2016, Green toured Japan twice for World Wonder Ring Stardom (WWRS). Her first tour was three months long, but was cut short by a broken collarbone while wrestling in India. Green's second tour of Japan was in late 2016, where she teamed with Santana Garrett for the 2016 Goddesses of Stardom Tag League. During this tour, Green also challenged Wonder of Stardom Champion Kairi Hojo to a match but lost. Green was undefeated in singles bouts in Japan, prior to her loss to Hojo.

Queens of Combat 17 on February 18, 2017, saw the start of the QOC Tag Team Championship tournament to crown the first QOC Tag Team Champions. Van Ness teamed with Taeler Hendrix and defeated Aja Perera and Kiera Hogan in the first round. At Queens of Combat 18, also on February 18, they defeated Nevaeh and Rachael Ellering in the semi-finals. Hendrix and Van Ness defeated The Lucha Sisters (Leva Bates and Mia Yim) to become the first QOC Tag Team Champions.

In September 2018, Green performed on the All In pay-per-view show, the first independent wrestling event in the U.S. to draw a live attendance of at least 10,000 fans. Green wrestled Britt Baker, Madison Rayne, and Tessa Blanchard in a Four corner survival match.

=== Total Nonstop Action Wrestling / Impact Wrestling (2016–2018) ===
On January 7, 2016, Green made her Total Nonstop Action Wrestling (TNA) debut under the ring name Chelsea, losing to Jade. The following night on January 8 at TNA One Night Only: Live!, she wrestled in a number one contenders gauntlet battle royal match for the TNA Knockouts Championship, entering the ongoing match at number four before being eliminated by Awesome Kong.

In June 2016, Green officially signed with Impact. She made her televised debut as a heel on the September 29 episode of Impact Wrestling under the new ring name Laurel Van Ness, defeating Madison Rayne. On the October 20 episode of Impact Wrestling, Van Ness attacked Allie which led to a match between the two where Van Ness was victorious. She attacked Allie again the following week, which led to another match between the two on the December 8 episode of Impact Wrestling, Van Ness was defeated.

In late 2016, Van Ness formed an on-screen relationship with Braxton Sutter. On February 23, 2017, the two were set to marry until Van Ness got rejected by Sutter during their wedding when he professed that he was in love with Allie (who is Sutter's legitimate wife). The following week of Impact Wrestling, the Lady Squad quietly disbanded when former leader Maria's contract expired.

In March, Van Ness started a maniacal gimmick, wrestling with a severely disheveled appearance (including a messy, damaged wedding dress and chaotic-looking make-up), barefoot, and carrying a wine bottle to the ring. Grado tried to propose to her on July 27, however he was interrupted by Kongo Kong.

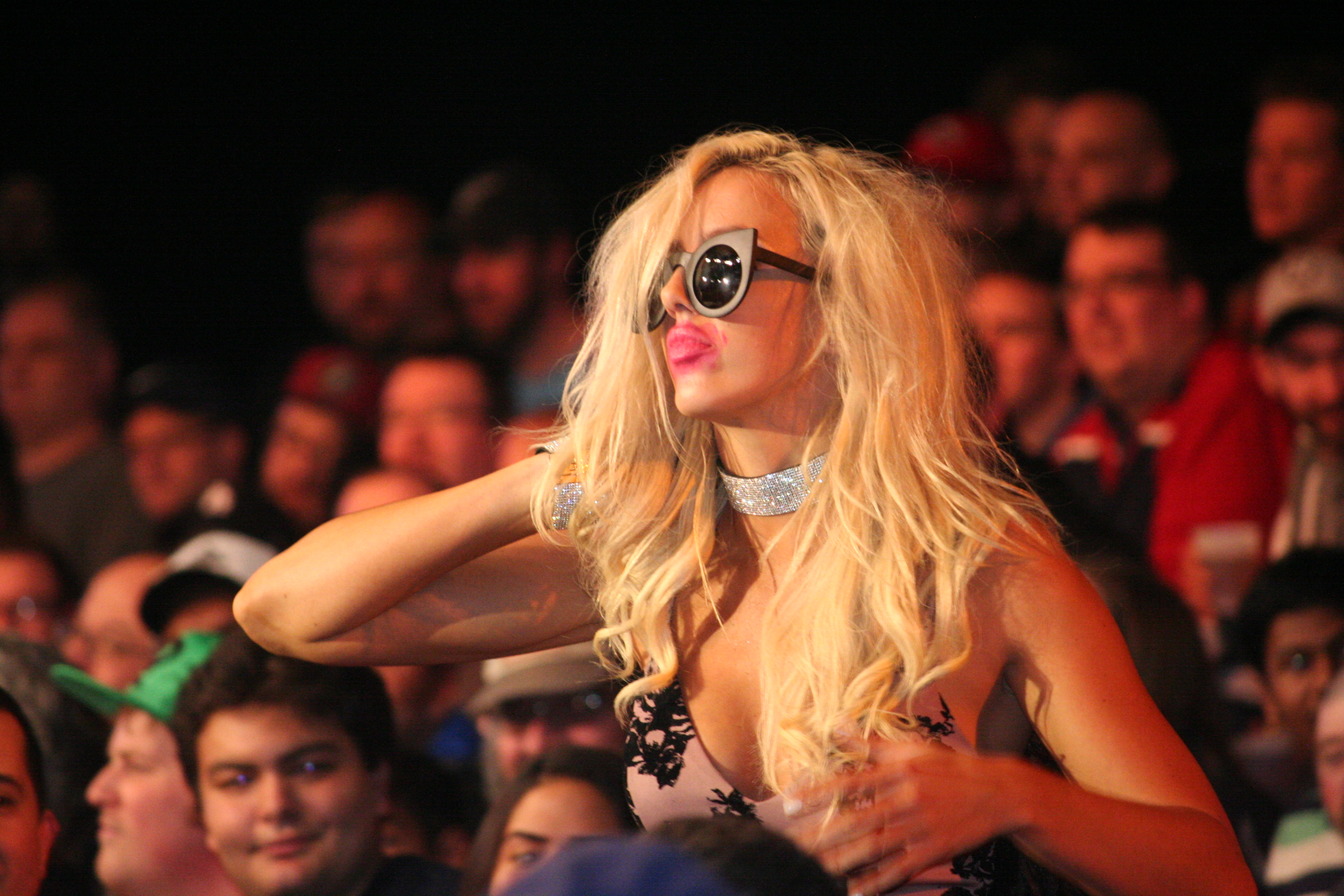
Van Ness at Bound for Glory in November 2017

On the August 24 episode of Impact, Van Ness came out, all cleaned-up, during Grado's deportation farewell address. She took out a wedding ring, asked Grado if he wanted to marry her and he said yes, establishing herself as a babyface for the first time in Impact. However, after Grado found out that Van Ness was Canadian, not American, he called off the wedding on the September 7 episode of Impact. Van Ness began turning heel when she reverted to her emotionally chaotic gimmick, which later included going out in the crowd and campaigning for a husband. On November 5, at Bound for Glory, Van Ness attacked Grado during his Monster's Ball match against Abyss, completing her heel turn, only to be on the receiving end of Rosemary's mist.

On November 8, which aired on a tape delay on December 14, Van Ness defeated Rosemary in a tournament final for the vacant Impact Knockouts Championship. During that time she also returned to her 'normal' ring gear instead of the ruined wedding dress, but retaining her chaotic/'drama' gimmick. At Genesis, Van Ness defeated Allie to retain the title. on the February 8 episode of Impact, Van Ness defeated Kiera Hogan to retain the title. Behind the scenes, Green planned to leave Impact Wrestling upon her contract's expiration, believing WWE would then immediately hire her, but Impact's producers cast her as champion before Green notified them she intended to leave. So, Green asked for her contractual release from the company while one of its onscreen titleholders; management, predictably, refused to release her while she was still champion in its storylines. On January 15, 2018, Impact officially released Green after she had completed her matches in the television tapings (where she ensured a smooth storyline continuity by losing the Knockouts Title to Allie).

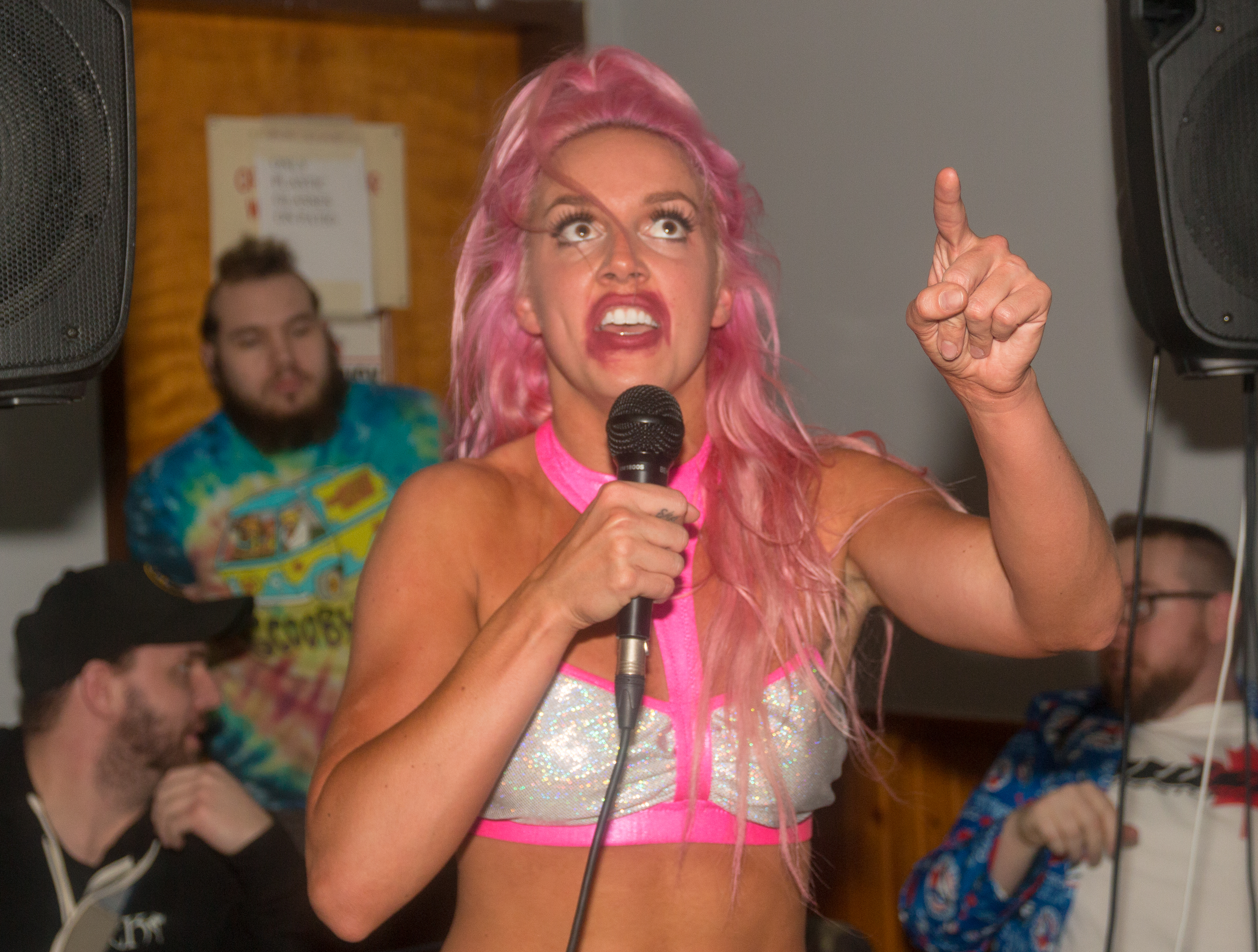
Green engaging in post-match theatrics following a loss, at a PWA show in Guelph, Ontario in February 2018

=== Lucha Underground (2018) ===
Green debuted in Lucha Underground at the season four tapings of Lucha Underground on February 25, 2018, under the stage name Reklusa. Green wrestled a fatal four-way with Jeremiah Crane, XO Lishus, and Marty "The Moth" Martinez. On October 10, Reklusa lost to Pentagón Dark in the main event.

=== WWE (2018–2021) ===
==== Sporadic appearances and Tough Enough (2014–2015) ====
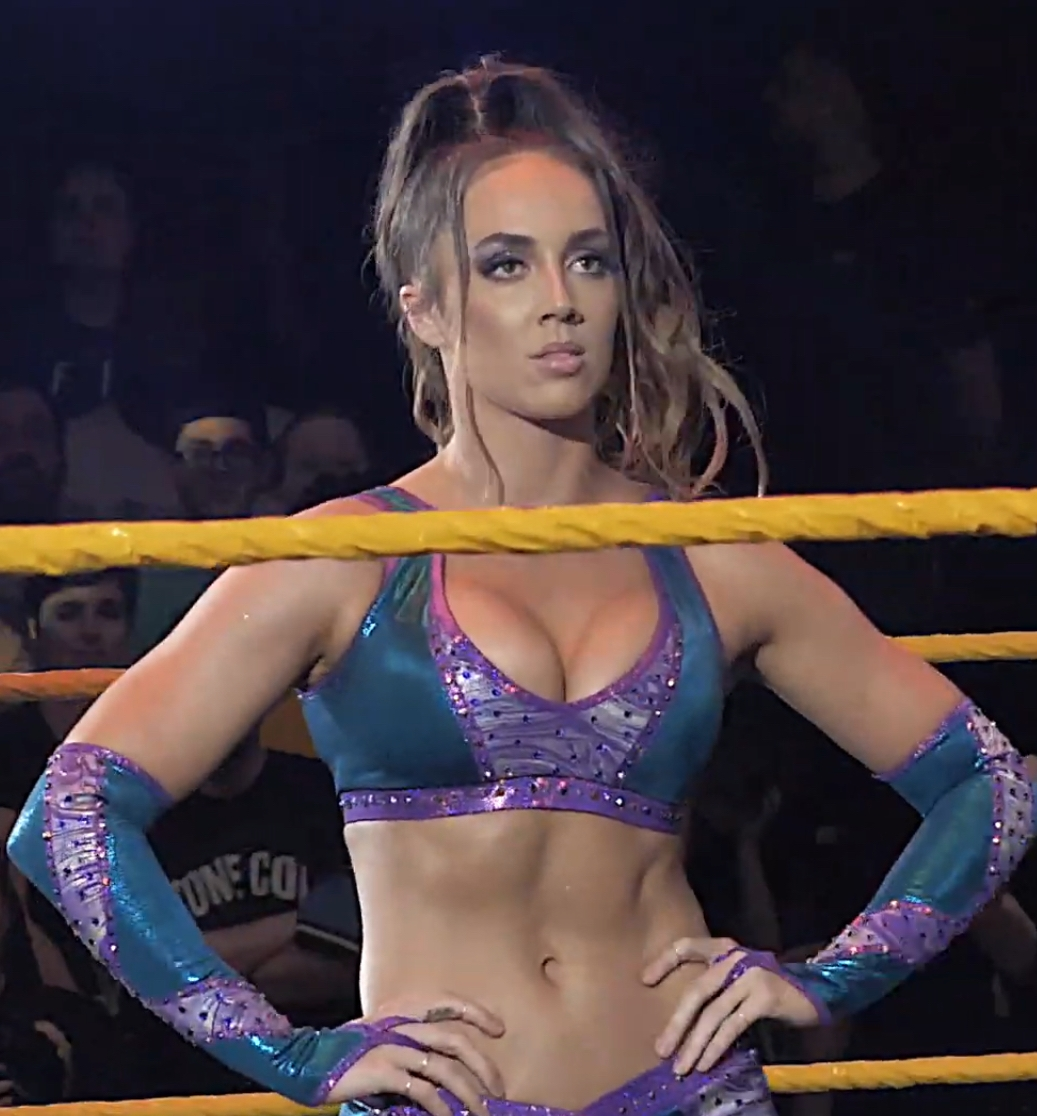
Green in 2020

Green made her first WWE appearance before signing for the company on the August 11, 2014 episode of Raw during the feud between Brie Bella and Stephanie McMahon, portraying Bella's real-life husband Daniel Bryan's physical therapist "Megan Miller," confessing that the two had been having an affair before an infuriated Bella stormed the ring and slapped her. In 2015, Green reappeared under her real name, as a contestant on the sixth season of the re-launched Tough Enough, finishing in fourth place for the females.

==== NXT (2018–2020) ====
Green took as part in a WWE tryout in 2018 and was signed on August 3, and reported to the WWE Performance Center on October 8. She made her NXT in-ring debut at a live event on October 26, competing under her familiar "psychotic" gimmick. However, she suffered a broken wrist during her first TV match on the March 13, 2019 NXT tapings and underwent surgery the following day on March 14. Green returned to the ring on June 29 at a NXT live event. Green appeared on the December 23, 2019 edition of Raw, competing in a losing effort against Charlotte Flair. On January 8, 2020, she returned to NXT alongside her new manager Robert Stone. On January 26, Green competed in the women's Royal Rumble match at the pay-per-view of the same name, which was eventually won by Flair. On the March 4 episode of NXT, Green defeated Shotzi Blackheart to qualify for a Ladder match at Takeover: Tampa Bay to determine the #1 contender for the NXT Women's Championship. The ladder match was moved to the April 8 episode of NXT where the match was won by Io Shirai. On the May 27 episode of NXT, she fired Robert Stone. Following the wind-up of Green's partnership with Stone, WWE had planned to call her up to Raw, but after the show's executive director Paul Heyman left the position, the plan was scrapped.

==== SmackDown (2020–2021) ====
Green made her SmackDown debut on the November 13, 2020 edition of SmackDown, where she participated in a fatal four-way qualifying match against Liv Morgan, Natalya, and Tamina to earn a spot at Survivor Series as part of the women's team, which Morgan won. Following the match, it was revealed that Green had broken her wrist again and that the planned finish which saw Green winning had to be changed to Morgan. After months of inactivity, on April 15, 2021, WWE released Green from her contract alongside other wrestlers.

=== Ring of Honor (2021) ===
On July 11, 2021, Green made her surprise debut at Ring of Honor (ROH)'s Best in the World pay-per-view event, introduced by Maria Kanellis-Bennett (who was an onscreen personality and behind-the-scenes producer for ROH). Originally, Green was scheduled to wrestle in the ROH Women's World Championship tournament; however, Green suffered an arm/wrist fracture prior to the date of her first round match, and the Maryland Athletic Commission (every match except the final was taped for ROH's weekly TV show in Baltimore, Maryland) didn't medically clear her in time to participate. While recovering from injury, Green appeared as one of the onscreen commentators for the tournament's first round matches.

=== Return to Impact Wrestling (2021–2022) ===
On July 17, 2021, at Slammiversary, Green returned to Impact Wrestling, but under her real name, wrestling in an intergender tag team match with real-life fiancé Matt Cardona, defeating Brian Myers and Tenille Dashwood. In October, Green entered the tournament to crown the first Impact Digital Media Champion: she defeated Madison Rayne in the first round, and lost to Jordynne Grace in the finals at the Bound for Glory pay-per-view show.

On January 8, 2022, at Hard to Kill, Green participated in the inaugural Knockouts Ultimate X match, which was won by Tasha Steelz. On the March 24, 2022 episode on Impact Wrestling, Green and Cardona attacked Mickie James after James was defeated by Steelz in a street fight match, turning heel in the process.

On the July 21 episode of Impact!, Green alongside Deonna Purrazzo, now dubbed as "VXT", faced the Knockouts World Champion Jordynne Grace and Mia Yim, which they were victorious. On August 12, at the pre-show of Emergence, VXT defeated Rosemary and Taya Valkyrie to win the Impact Knockouts World Tag Team Championship. They lost the title on October 7 at Bound for Glory to The Death Dollz (Jessicka, Rosemary and Valkyrie), ending their reign at 56 days. Green had her last match with the company against Mickie James on the November 11 episode of Impact in a losing effort. After her loss to James, Green and Purazzo would have a backstage segment where Green would say she was "going home". It would then be reported that Green had left Impact officially.

=== Return to WWE (2023–present) ===
==== WWE Women's Tag Team Champion (2023–2024) ====
On January 28, 2023, Green made her surprise return to WWE at Royal Rumble as a participant in the Women's Royal Rumble match. Entering the match at number 20, Green was quickly eliminated by Rhea Ripley in five seconds, a Women's Royal Rumble record. Upon her return, she became a member of the Raw brand, and would soon adopt the gimmick of a "Karen".

On the March 27 episode of Raw, Green teamed up with Sonya Deville and defeated the team of "Michin" Mia Yim and Candice LeRae to qualify for the Women's WrestleMania Showcase match. At WrestleMania 39, Green and Deville were unsuccessful, with the match being won by Ronda Rousey and Shayna Baszler. Green and Deville were drafted to the Raw brand as part of the 2023 WWE Draft. On the July 3 episode of Raw, after a five-match losing streak, Green and Deville won a tag team turmoil match for a WWE Women's Tag Team Championship opportunity and defeated Liv Morgan and Raquel Rodriguez for the titles on the July 17 episode of Raw to win her first championship in WWE.

On August 7, Deville was reported to have suffered an ACL injury and had to relinquish her half of the tag team title. A week later, despite Green wanting to hold auditions for a new tag team partner, a returning Piper Niven took one half of the tag team titles and declared she would be Green’s new partner. Although Green touted herself as a two-time champion, WWE recognizes this change as a continuation of Green's original title reign with Deville, ending Green's reign with Deville at 28 days. On the October 30 episode of Raw, Green won her first singles match on the main roster where she defeated Natalya in a Trick-or-Street Fight match. The following night, Green and Niven returned to NXT to successfully defend the tag team titles against Chase University (Thea Hail and Jacy Jayne) at Week 2 of NXT: Halloween Havoc. On December 11, it was announced that Green and Niven would defend their tag team titles against new number one contenders Kayden Carter and Katana Chance. The following week on Raw, Green and Niven lost the tag team titles to Carter and Chance, ending their reign at 126 days and Green's individual reign at 154 days. On the January 8, 2024 episode of Raw, Green and Niven were unsuccessful in regaining the titles in a rematch.

At Royal Rumble, Green entered at #14 in the women's Royal Rumble match, lasting over 17 minutes before being eliminated by Becky Lynch. At Night 2 of the 2024 WWE Draft, Green and Niven were drafted to the SmackDown brand. Green made a surprise appearance at Week 2 of Spring Breakin' on April 30 where she was announced as NXT Women's Champion Roxanne Perez's next title challenger but failed to defeat Perez the following week. Green then competed in the women's Money In The Bank ladder match at Money in the Bank on July 6 in her home country of Canada, but was unsuccessful after the match was won by Tiffany Stratton. On November 2 at Crown Jewel, Green and Niven completed in a fatal four-way tag team match for the WWE Women's Tag Team Championship in a losing effort.

==== Inaugural Women's United States Champion and The Green Regime (2024–2026) ====
On the November 22, 2024 episode of SmackDown, Green entered the tournament to crown the inaugural Women's United States Champion, defeating Blair Davenport and WWE Women's Tag Team Champion Bianca Belair in a triple threat match in the preliminary round. After defeating Bayley in the semifinals, Green advanced to the finals at Saturday Night’s Main Event on December 14, where she defeated Michin to become the inaugural Women's United States Champion, her first singles title win in WWE. Additionally, Green and her husband Matt Cardona (who performed in WWE under the ring name Zack Ryder) became the first husband and wife duo to win the women's and men's United States Championships. After the title win, Green took on the gimmick of America's "head of state" with Niven acting as Green's bodyguard (dubbed as Green's Secret Hervice, a pun on Secret Service).

On the January 10, 2025 episode of SmackDown, Green successfully defend the title against Michin in a rematch. At Royal Rumble on February 1, Green competed in the Royal Rumble match entering at number 5 where she lasted over 26 minutes, eliminating Lash Legend and B-Fab in the process before inadvertently being eliminated by Piper Niven. On the March 7 episode of SmackDown, Green again defeated Michin in a Philadelphia Street Fight to retain the title when Alba Fyre interfered on her behalf and joining The Secret Hervice. On the March 18 episode of NXT, Green successfully defended the title against Sol Ruca. Her new stable with Niven and Fyre was then named The Green Regime. On the April 25 episode of SmackDown, Green lost the title to Zelina Vega, ending her reign at 132 days. On May 24 at Saturday Night's Main Event XXXIX, Green failed to regain the Women's United States Championship from Vega while suffering a nose injury.

On the August 19 episode of NXT, The Green Regime appeared to aid the NXT North American Champion Ethan Page in his feud against Tavion Heights and Tyra Mae Steele. Green and Page emerged victorious at NXT Heatwave in a mixed tag team match. At Lucha Libre AAA Worldwide (AAA) Day of the Dead on November 2, Green and Page defeated La Hiedra and Mr. Iguana to win the AAA World Mixed Tag Team Championship. On the November 7 episode of SmackDown, Green defeated Giulia to win her second Women's United States Championship, becoming a double champion in the process. On the January 2 episode of Smackdown, Green lost the title back to Giulia after interference from Kiana James, ending her second reign at 56 days. On the February 7, 2026 episode of AAA on Fox, Page and Green lost the AAA World Mixed Tag Team Championship to Mr. Iguana and Lola Vice, ending the pair's reign at 97 days.

==== WWE Women's Champion (2026) ====
After the departure of Fyre from WWE in April 2026 and the injury of Niven in late 2025, Green formed an alliance with Tiffany Stratton, turning face for the first time since 2022. At Night 2 of SummerSlam on August 2, Green defeated Stratton, Jade Cargill, Charlotte Flair and Lash Legend in a five-way Ladder match to win the Interim WWE Women's Championship, due to lineal champion Rhea Ripley being out with an injury. On the August 7 episode of SmackDown, Green and Stratton challenged Fatal Influence (Fallon Henley and Lainey Reid) for the WWE Women's Tag Team Championship in a losing effort after interference from Jacy Jayne. After the match, however, Green suffered a legitimate injury in her orbital bone. The following week on SmackDown, SmackDown General Manager Nick Aldis asked Green to relinquish the title as she was not medically cleared to compete, but Green relented. Aldis then gave Green thirty days to get cleared and defend the title. On September 11, WWE retroactively ended Ripley's reign on August 2 and Green was recognized as the lineal champion. On the September 11 episode of SmackDown, Green defended her title within the allotted 30-day period when she defeated Nia Jax to retain the title. At Crown Jewel on November 7, Green defeated Women's World Champion Liv Morgan to win the 2026 Women's Crown Jewel Championship. Immediately after the match, Stratton turned on Green and successfully cashed in her Money in the Bank briefcase for the WWE Women's Championship, ending Green’s reign at 97 days.

== Personal life ==
On April 4, 2019, her 28th birthday, Green announced her engagement to American professional wrestler Matt Cardona. The two had been dating since January 2017. They were married on New Year’s Eve 2021 in Las Vegas. Green announced on January 16, 2024, that she attained a United States green card.

Green has supraventricular tachycardia, a condition that causes electrical irregularities in the atrias resulting in cardiac arrythmias. She underwent surgery in May 2026 to correct the condition.

Green is a fan of association football and supports English Premier League club Chelsea.

== Filmography ==
=== Film ===
Year	Title	Role	Notes
2016	Chokeslam!	Angel	
2018	Heel Kick!	Herself	Cameo
2020	Parallel Minds	Alexa	
2022	Last Date	Kim	Short film
2023	American Nightmare: Becoming Cody Rhodes	Herself	Documentary
2024	A Bluegrass Christmas	Claire Crosby	

=== Television ===
Year	Title	Role	Notes
2015	WWE Tough Enough	Contestant	Season 6
2024	News Hour	Herself	1 episode
2024	Celtic Warrior Workouts	Herself	1 episode
2025	Dimension 20	Herself	4 episodes
2025	Dhar Mann	Wrestler	1 episode
2025	Watch What Happens Live with Andy Cohen	Herself	1 episode
2025	WWE Unreal	Herself	Docuseries

=== Video games ===
Year	Title	Role	Notes
2019	WWE SuperCard	Chelsea Green	Video game debut
2024	WWE Champions	Chelsea Green	
2024	WWE 2K24	Chelsea Green	
2025	WWE 2K25	Chelsea Green	
2026	WWE 2K26	Chelsea Green	

== Championships and accomplishments ==
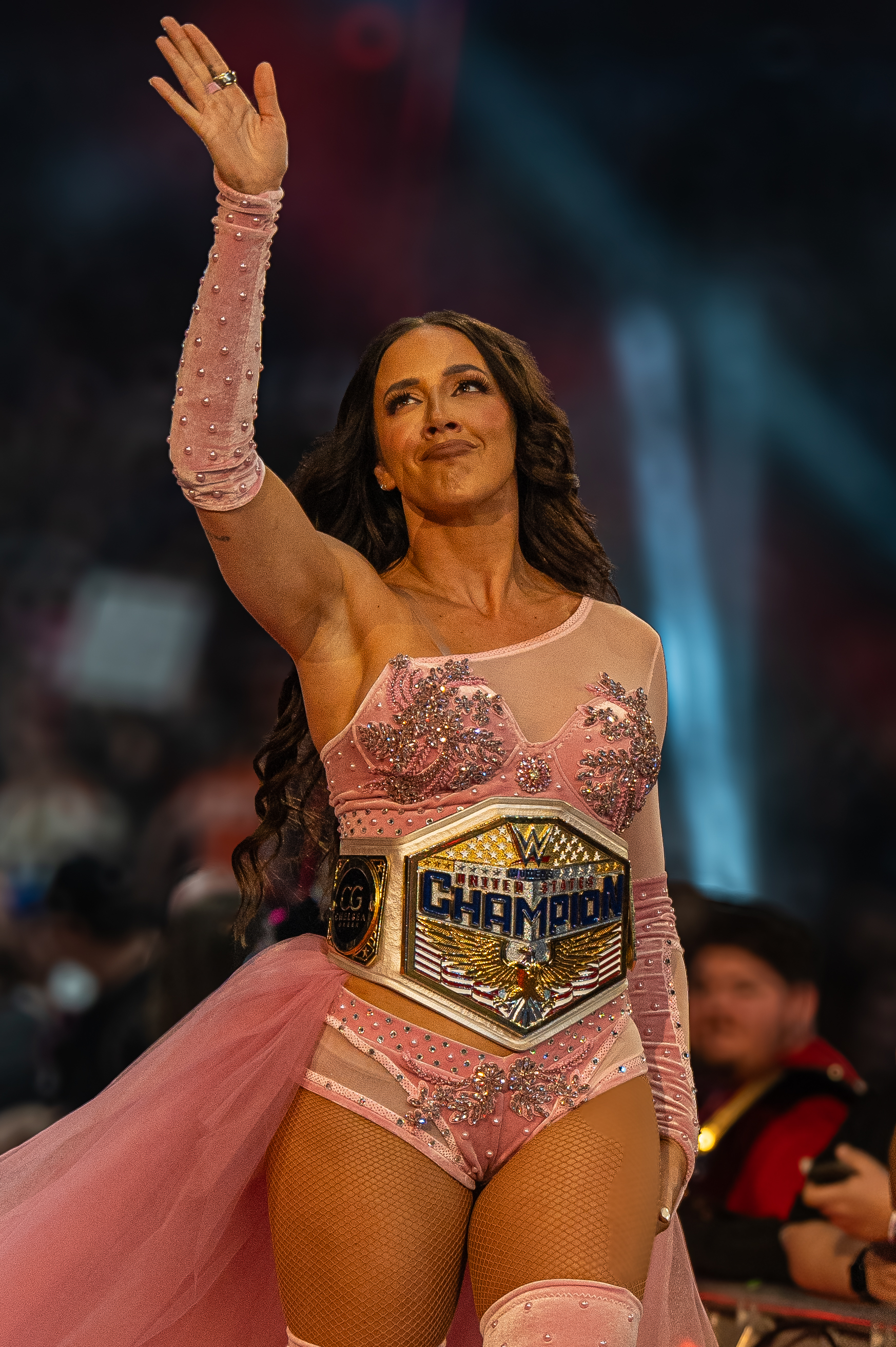
Green is the inaugural two-time WWE Women's United States Champion...

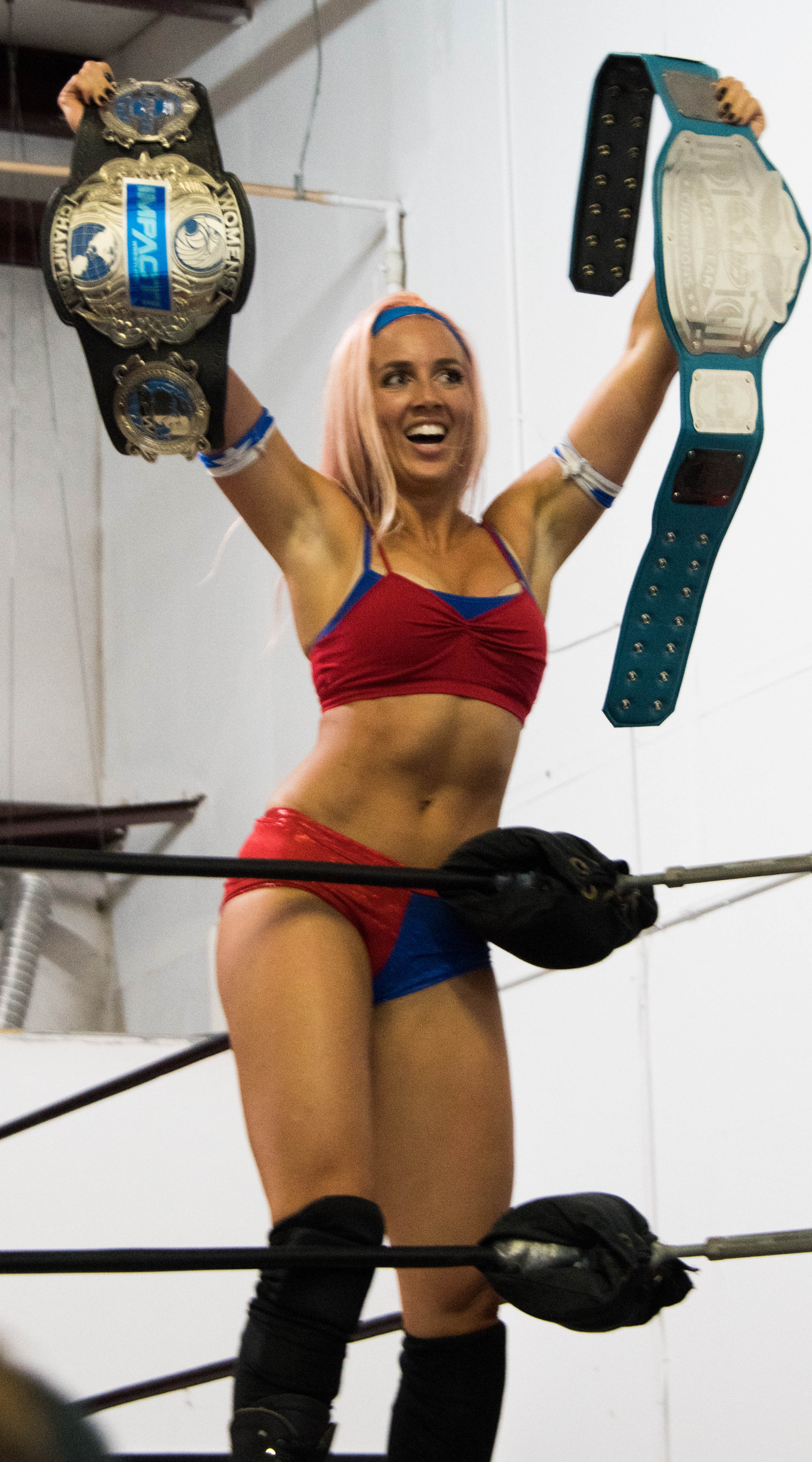
...a former one-time Impact Knockouts Champion, a former one-time PW2.0 Women's Tag Champion...

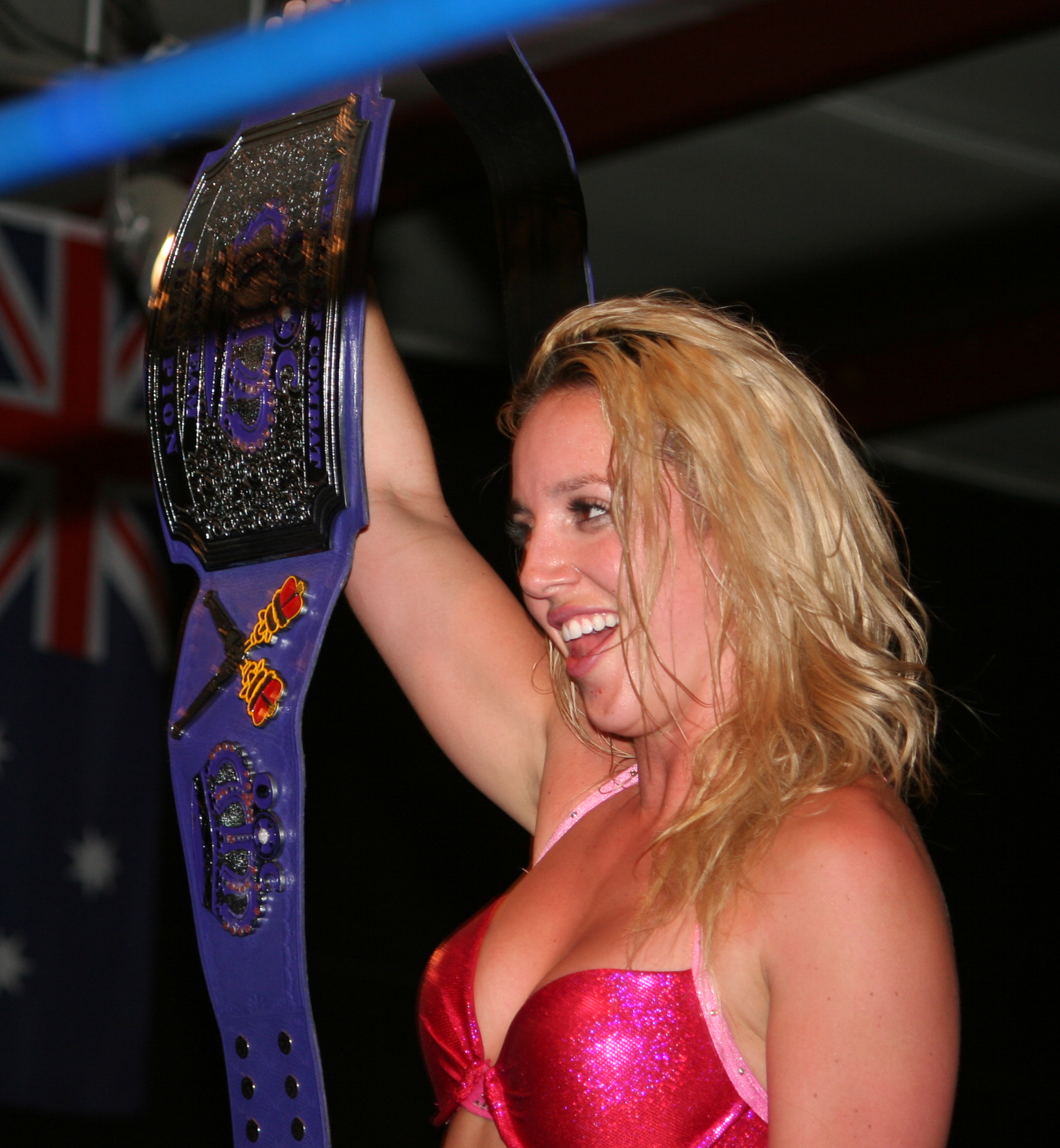
...and a former one-time QOC Tag Team Champion.

- All-Star Wrestling
  - ASW Women's Championship (1 time)
  - ASW Women's Championship Tournament (2015)
- ESPN
  - SummerSlam Night 2 Moment of the Night Champion (2026)
- Impact Wrestling
  - Impact Knockouts Championship (1 time)
  - Impact Knockouts World Tag Team Championship (1 time) – with Deonna Purrazzo
- National Wrestling Alliance
  - NWA Women's Invitational Cup (2021)
- Lucha Libre AAA Worldwide
  - AAA World Mixed Tag Team Championship (1 time) – with Ethan Page
- Pro Wrestling Illustrated
  - Ranked No. 26 of the top 50 female singles wrestlers in the PWI Female 50 in 2017 and 2019
- Pro Wrestling 2.0
  - PW2.0 Women's Tag Team Championship (1 time) – with Santana Garrett
- Queens of Combat
  - QOC Tag Team Championship (1 time) – with Taeler Hendrix
  - QOC Tag Team Championship Tournament (2017) – with Taeler Hendrix
- WWE
  - WWE Women's Championship (1 time)
  - WWE Women's United States Championship (2 times, inaugural)
  - WWE Women's Tag Team Championship (1 time) – with Sonya Deville / Piper Niven
  - WWE Women's Crown Jewel Championship (2026)
  - Interim WWE Women's Championship Tournament (2026)
  - WWE Women's United States Championship Tournament (2024)
