= Bound for Glory (2017) =

2017 Impact Wrestling pay-per-view event

- Promotional poster featuring various Impact wrestlers
- Promotion: Impact Wrestling
- Date: November 5, 2017
- City: Ottawa, Ontario, Canada
- Venue: Aberdeen Pavilion
- Attendance: 650

Pay-per-view chronology
← Previous; Slammiversary XV	Next → Redemption

Bound for Glory chronology
← Previous; 2016	Next → 2018

The 2017 Bound for Glory was a professional wrestling pay-per-view (PPV) event produced by Impact Wrestling. It took place on November 5, 2017, at the Aberdeen Pavilion in Ottawa, Ontario. It was the thirteenth event under the Bound for Glory chronology, the second and last Impact pay-per-view event of 2017. It was also the first and only Bound for Glory event to take place in November, and the second Bound for Glory event to take place outside of the United States.

Due to Impact Wrestling's partnership with Mexican Promotion Lucha Libre AAA Worldwide (AAA), wrestlers from that promotion also appeared on the card, including El Hijo del Fantasma, Pagano (wrestler), El Texano Jr., Garza Jr., and Johnny Mundo also with Impact Wrestling's Partnership with Japanese Promotion Pro Wrestling Noah, wrestlers from that promotion also appeared on the card, including Taiji Ishimori and GHC Heavyweight Champion Eddie Edwards.

In October 2017, with the launch of the Global Wrestling Network, the event became available to stream on demand.

== Production ==
=== Storylines ===
Bound for Glory featured professional wrestling matches involving different wrestlers from pre-existing scripted feuds and storylines. Wrestlers portrayed villains, heroes, or less distinguishable characters in the scripted events that built tension and culminate in a wrestling match or series of matches.

On August 17, a video package was shown at Destination X revealing that Johnny Impact will be debuting for the company next week. On the August 24 episode of Impact!, he made his televised in-ring debut in a Gauntlet for the Gold match for the vacant Impact Global Championship, ending in the final three before being eliminated by eventual winner Eli Drake. The following week, Impact and Eddie Edwards interrupted Eli Drake's championship celebration, which led to a tag-team match on the main-event, which Drake and Chris Adonis won. On the September 14 episode of Impact!, Johnny Impact defeated Low Ki to become the number one contender to the Impact Global Championship at Victory Road. After the match, Drake and Adonis brutally attacked Impact. The following week, Impact defended his number one contender status in two matches, defeating both KM and Texano in the same night. At Victory Road, Impact was defeated by Drake and failed to win the Impact Global Championship. After the match, he was attacked by Drake and Adonis but was saved by Garza Jr. However, the two of them were assaulted by The Latin American Xchange. On the October 12 episode of Impact!, Impact defeated Garza in a number one contendership match to challenge Eli Drake for the Impact Global Championship at Bound for Glory.

It was announced that Impact Knockouts Champion Sienna would defend her title against Allie, Gail Kim, and Taryn Terrell. However, Terrell was pulled from the match due to leaving Impact. On November 4, 2017, it was announced that the scheduled match between Rosemary and Taya Valkyrie had been cancelled, due to unforeseen personal circumstances regarding Taya.

== Reception ==
Other on-screen personnel
Commentator	Jeremy Borash
Commentator	Josh Mathews
Ring announcer	Jeffrey Scott
Referee	Brandon Tolle
Referee	John E. Bravo
Referee	Kris Levin
Interviewers	McKenzie Mitchell

Bound for Glory received negative reviews by critics. Mike Johnson of PWInsider summarized Bound for Glory by writing that "Impact has their chance to make a statement but instead does the same old thing". This was referencing the "completely bullshit finish" of Alberto El Patrón's decisive interference in the "really, really good" Drake-Impact main event, which "was the same overbooked ending that we've seen in a ton of Impact main events dating back a decade plus" - despite those who were "blamed for these decisions in the past" (Vince Russo, Jeff Jarrett, or Dixie Carter) having left the company. Johnson felt this was a highly inappropriate way to treat "fans in a brand new market" and die-hard paying customers at Impact's "biggest show of the year."

Jason Powell of Pro Wrestling Dot Net described Bound for Glory as "a poor show with few redeeming qualities ... the new creative regime made a lousy first impression". Regarding the main event, Powell criticized the "bush league TNA finish" and "a chair shot to the head in 2017".

Mike McMahon of Pro Wrestling Torch wrote that Bound for Glory was "really bad ... 3/10 at most. There wasn't any matches that stood out as being great, and at the same time, a lot of it felt flat ... The booking on the show was below average, at best." Also, McMahon felt that it was "absolutely inexcusable to make El Patron the focal point of the company" given his "long history" of screwing up.

Adam Martin of WrestleView wrote that "Bound for Glory disappoints in Ottawa" and that "the pacing of the show was really bad".

Larry Csonka of 411Mania rated the show a "bad" rating of 3/10. He wrote that although he wanted the show to be great, "highly questionable booking, some bad wrestling and mostly flat action with a crowd that died as the night went on" were reasons why the show failed to deliver. He would end his review stating "Nothing was special, nothing was memorable in a good way; this show failed its fans."

== Results ==
No.	Results	Stipulations	Times
1	Trevor Lee (c) defeated Dezmond Xavier, Garza Jr., Matt Sydal, Petey Williams and Sonjay Dutt	Six-way match for the Impact X Division Championship	12:25
2	Taiji Ishimori defeated Tyson Dux	Singles match	04:50
3	Abyss defeated Grado	Monster's Ball match (Since Grado lost, his work visa was terminated and he was forced to leave the United States)	10:40
4	Team Impact (Ethan Carter III, Eddie Edwards and James Storm) defeated Team AAA (El Hijo del Fantasma, Pagano and Texano)	Six-man tag team match	15:30
5	Ohio Versus Everything (Dave Crist and Jake Crist) (c) defeated The Latin American Xchange (Santana and Ortiz) (with Konnan)	5150 Street Fight for the Impact World Tag Team Championship	10:35
6	Gail Kim defeated Sienna (c) and Allie	Three-way match for the Impact Knockouts Championship	9:40
7	Lashley and King Mo (with American Top Team) defeated Moose and Stephan Bonnar	Six Sides of Steel tag team match	10:40
8	Eli Drake (c) (with Chris Adonis) defeated Johnny Impact	Singles match for the Impact Global Championship	19:30
(c) / – the champion(s) heading into the match

== See also ==
- 2017 in professional wrestling
- Professional wrestling in Canada
- Bound for Glory Series
