= Impact Wrestling Redemption =

2018 professional wrestling event

Redemption
- Official poster featuring various Impact wrestlers
- Promotion: Impact Wrestling
- Date: April 22, 2018
- City: Orlando, Florida
- Venue: Impact Zone

Pay-per-view chronology
| ← Previous; Bound for Glory | Next → Slammiversary XVI |

Redemption was a professional wrestling pay-per-view (PPV) event produced by Impact Wrestling that took place on April 22, 2018, at the Impact Zone in Orlando, Florida. It was the first and only event under the Redemption chronology and the first event in the 2018 Impact Wrestling pay-per-view schedule. Wrestlers from Lucha Libre AAA Worldwide (AAA) and Lucha Underground, with whom Impact had partnerships, also appear on the card.

Eight matches were contested at the event. In the main event, Pentagón Jr. defeated Austin Aries and Fénix in a three-way match for the Impact World Championship. In other prominent matches, Eli Drake and Scott Steiner defeated The Latin American Xchange (Santana and Ortiz) to win the Impact World Tag Team Championship, Ohio Versus Everything (Dave Crist, Jake Crist and Sami Callihan) defeated Eddie Edwards, Moose and Tommy Dreamer in a House of Hardcore match, and Matt Sydal and Allie retained the X Division and Knockouts Championships respectively, with Sydal defeating Petey Williams, and Allie defeating Su Yung. The event also marked the Impact debut of Tessa Blanchard.

It was also Impact's final pay-per-view event overall to take place at the Impact Zone at Universal Studios Florida, as the company would return once more to touring in various venues around North America.

== Production ==
=== Storylines ===
Redemption will feature professional wrestling matches involving different wrestlers from pre-existing scripted feuds and storylines. Wrestlers portrayed villains, heroes, or less distinguishable characters in the scripted events that built tension and culminate in a wrestling match or series of matches.

Austin Aries was originally scheduled to defend the Impact World Championship against Alberto El Patrón. However, El Patrón was released from Impact Wrestling on April 7 after legitimately no showing the Lucha Underground vs. Impact Wrestling event in New Orleans at Wrestlecon the previous night. The match became a triple threat match between Aries, Pentagón Jr. and Rey Fenix, which Pentagon won. The following night at the House of Hardcore 40, Aries grabbed the microphone after his match against Brian Cage, and stated that they should do the match again at Redemption for the Impact World Championship.

On March 15 during the Feast or Fired episode of Impact!, Eli Drake received the case for the tag team title opportunity. On the April 12 episode of Impact!, Drake announced that he would be cashing in his case at Redemption and he would be teaming with Scott Steiner to challenge The Latin American Xchange for the Impact World Tag Team Championship.

== Event ==
Other on-screen personnel
| Commentator | Josh Mathews |
| Commentator | Don Callis |
| Ring announcer | Jeffery Scott |
| Referee | Brandon Tolle |
| Referee | John E. Bravo |
| Referee | Kris Levin |
| Interviewers | McKenzie Mitchell |

== Aftermath ==
During the event, Konnan was attacked backstage culminating to a string of LAX losses due to its leaders absence. On the May 24th edition of Impact Wrestling, Eddie Kingston returned renamed as King took over as leader of LAX helping the team regain the tag titles on the June 21 edition of Impact Wrestling. On the same night, Konnan returned and accused King of organizing a hit on him which he admitted leading to Homicide and Hernandez attacking The Latin American Xchange creating a civil war which culminated to a 5150 street fight.

Su Yung would attack Allie on the April 26 edition of Impact, this time debuting her legion of 'Undead Brides' in an attempt to put Allie in a coffin only for Rosemary to make the save, leading to the Su Yung/Rosemary feud that culminated in the 'Death of Rosemary' which led to Su Yung overcoming the Demon Assassin by putting her in a coffin and setting it ablaze in the May 17th edition of Impact. Allie would then have her last stand against Su Yung in a last rites match for the knockouts title, which Allie lost and was buried by Su Yung.

== Reception ==
Redemption was met with primarily positive reviews. Larry Csonka of 411mania rated the event 7 stars out of 10 felt "it was a good return to PPV for the company with a little something for everyone. We had some good wrestling, the debut of Tessa Blanchard, some surprising title changes and retentions, and an overall sense of fun the product has lacked overall on PPV for a long time'. Massive praise went to the Aries-Pentagon-Fenix match and House of Hardcore match."

Mike McMahon from PWTorch wrote that "I don't think there's any doubt, this PPV blew Bound for Glory out of the water. Almost every single match delivered, and the main event was well put together. Almost every match told a logical and good story. The action was very good. Everything was solid."

Prowrestling.net editor, Jason Powell said, "Redemption on a high note and it was refreshing to see the company go against the grain. Furthermore, it was good to see a title match end with a clean finish rather than the all too typical nonsense we’ve seen on far too many Impact pay-per-views over the years. The main event was highly entertaining and it was nice to end the show in a way that shakes things up in an unexpected manner going into the next set of television tapings."

== Results ==
| No. | Results | Stipulations | Times |
|---|---|---|---|
| 1 | Aerostar defeated Drago | Singles match | 11:45 |
| 2 | Eli Drake and Scott Steiner defeated The Latin American Xchange (Santana and Ortiz) (c) | Tag team match for the Impact World Tag Team Championship (This was Drake's Feast or Fired Tag Team Title match) | 07:55 |
| 3 | Brian Cage defeated Dezmond Xavier, DJZ, El Hijo del Fantasma, Taiji Ishimori and Trevor Lee | X Division Six-way match | 12:50 |
| 4 | Taya Valkyrie defeated Kiera Hogan | Singles match | 08:05 |
| 5 | Matt Sydal (c) defeated Petey Williams | Singles match for the Impact X Division Championship (This was Williams' Feast or Fired X Division Title match) | 11:35 |
| 6 | Ohio Versus Everything (Dave Crist, Jake Crist and Sami Callihan) defeated Eddie Edwards, Moose and Tommy Dreamer | House of Hardcore match | 12:55 |
| 7 | Allie (c) defeated Su Yung (with Braxton Sutter) | Singles match for the Impact Knockouts Championship | 07:15 |
| 8 | Pentagón Jr. defeated Austin Aries (c) and Fénix | Three-way match for the Impact World Championship | 16:20 |
(c) / – the champion(s) heading into the match

== See also ==
- 2018 in professional wrestling
