= Larry Csonka (journalist) =

American professional wrestling journalist

- Died: May 18, 2020
- Citizenship: United States
- Years active: 2002–2020
- Known for: professional wrestling journalism
- Children: 2

Larry Thomas Csonka (1978 – May 18, 2020) was a prolific American professional wrestling reporter and critic mainly associated with 411Mania where he was editor-in-chief from 2007 until his death.

== Early life ==
Larry Thomas Csonka was born and raised in Pittsburgh, Pennsylvania. His interest in wrestling began early as he started watching shows on Saturday mornings with his grandmother at age five.

== Career ==
Csonka's writing career began in 2002 and he joined 411Mania in 2004. Csonka was offered the job after he became displeased with the sites lackluster reporting on Total Nonstop Action Wrestling and started writing his own on the sites fan forum, impressing staff at 411Mania. Csonka wrote reviews for every major wrestling show, and consumed 18 to 30 hours of wrestling per week, covering World Wrestling Entertainment, All Elite Wrestling, New Japan Pro-Wrestling, Ring of Honor, CMLL, Impact Wrestling, EVOLVE and the NWA Wrestling, as well as many other shows. He covered several LGBT related controversies in wrestling during his career. He also worked as a transcriber of podcasts and radio shows.

As the wrestling landscape changed on the internet, impacting the ways news is delivered, filtered and processed, Csonka remained one of the few constants in the wrestling journalism. Trought his work he became a prominent figure of the online wrestling community.

== Personal life ==
Csonka was married and had two daughters.

== Health issues and death ==
Csonka experienced health issues throughout 2019, when his left leg had to be amputated due to a blood infection that was magnified because of his diabetes. He died on May 18, 2020.

Csonka's death was met with on outpouring of grief among his fellow wrestling journalists. Csonka's colleagues at 411Wrestling created the "Semi-Annual Larry Csonka Memorial Fact or Fiction Tournament" in honor of his journalistic work.
