= TNA Knockouts World Championship =

Women's professional wrestling world championship

- The current TNA Knockouts World Championship belt

Details
- Promotion: Total Nonstop Action Wrestling
- Date established: October 14, 2007
- Current champion: Indi Hartwell
- Date won: October 11, 2026

Other names
- TNA Women's World Championship (2007–2008); TNA Women's Knockout Championship (2008–2010); TNA Knockouts Championship (2010–2017); Impact Wrestling Knockouts Championship (2017); Unified GFW Knockouts Championship (2017); GFW Knockouts Championship (2017); Impact Knockouts Championship (2017–2021); Impact Knockouts World Championship (2021–2024); TNA Knockouts World Championship (2024–present)
Statistics
- First champion: Gail Kim
- Most reigns: Gail Kim (7 reigns)
- Longest reign: Taya Valkyrie (377 days)
- Shortest reign: Gail Kim (7th reign, 18 hours)
- Oldest champion: Mickie James (43 years, 135 days)
- Youngest champion: Taylor Wilde (22 years, 150 days)
- Heaviest champion: Awesome Kong (272 lbs (123 kg))
- Lightest champion: Miss Tessmacher (109 lbs (49 kg)

The TNA Knockouts World Championship is a women's professional wrestling world championship owned by Total Nonstop Action Wrestling (TNA). The championship debuted on October 14, 2007, at the Bound for Glory pay-per-view (PPV) event and the inaugural champion was Gail Kim. The current champion is Indi Hartwell, who is in her first reign. She won the title by defeating Xia Brookside at Bound for Glory on October 11, 2026.

== History ==
=== TNA Knockout ===
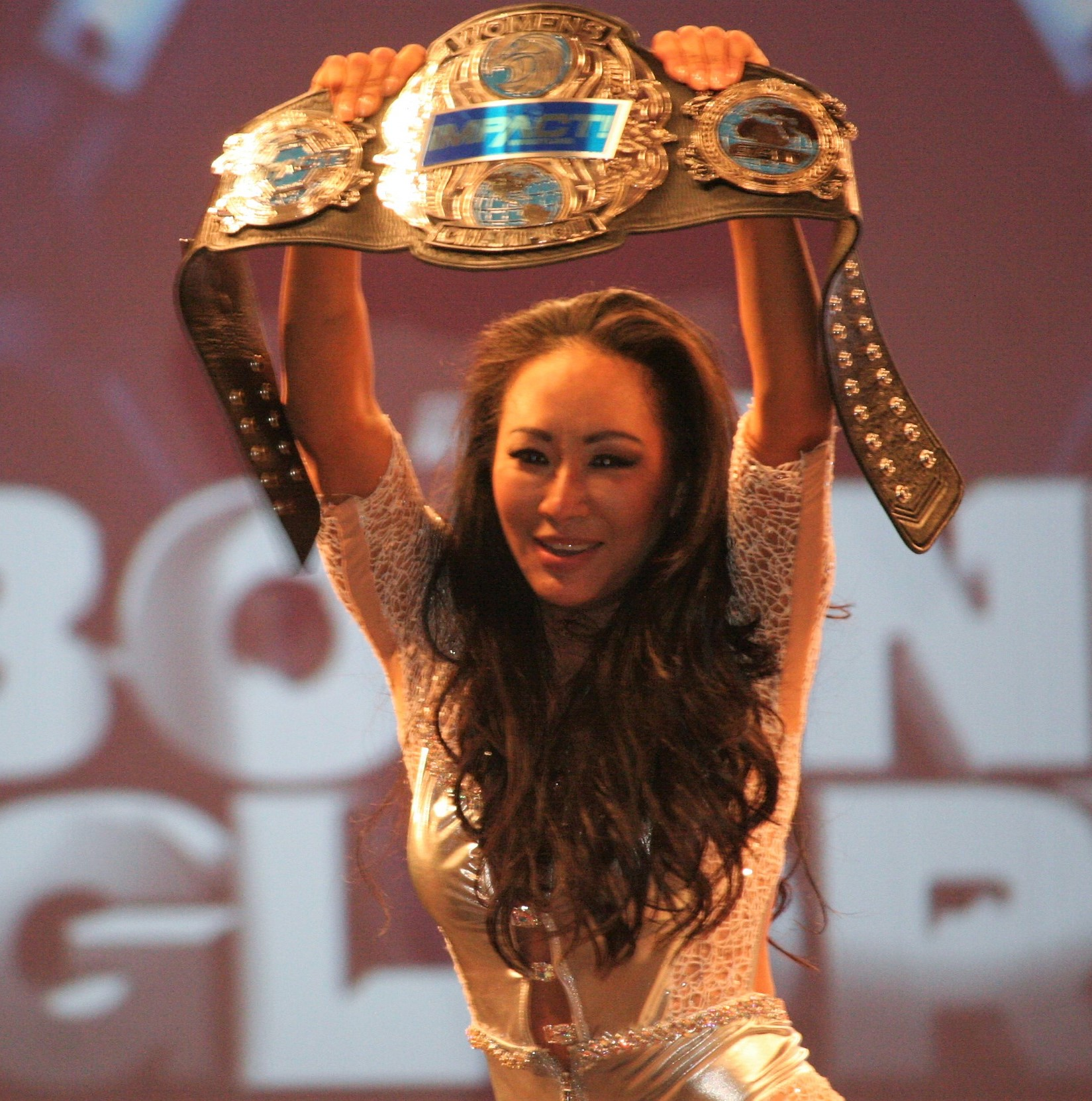
Inaugural and record-setting 7-time champion Gail Kim.

TNA Knockout, or just Knockout for short, is the term used by TNA to refer to its onscreen female performers; this is similar to TNA's main rival World Wrestling Entertainment and their Divas pseudonym. TNA's first women's accomplishment was announced at TNA's first weekly pay-per-view event on June 19, 2002. It was called the "Miss TNA" Crown. The holder of the crown was determined in a lingerie battle royal on June 19, 2002, which aired on June 26, 2002. The participants in the match were Alexis Laree, Elektra, Erin Bray, Francine, Miss Joni, Sasha, Shannon, Taylor Vaughn, and Teresa Tyler. Vaughn last eliminated Elektra to win the crown. The TNA Knockout of the Year is another award in TNA given to the knockout who achieved the most or had the best run that year. The most recent Knockout of the Year was Jordynne Grace receiving the award in 2024.

On the August 20, 2009 episode of TNA Impact!, backstage interviewer Lauren announced that TNA were planning to host an eight-team single elimination tag team tournament to crown the first TNA Knockouts Tag Team Champions. The tournament began on the following Impact! and continued on for four weeks, concluding on September 20 at TNA's No Surrender PPV event. There, the team of Sarita and Taylor Wilde defeated The Beautiful People (Madison Rayne and Velvet Sky) to become the first champions. (Note: TNA Knockouts title is the main women's title of the company. On August 20, 2009, the TNA Knockouts Tag Team Championship officially became TNA's second women's championship, separate from the first, main, and established TNA Knockouts Championship, giving the TNA Knockouts division and the TNA Knockouts title more credibility and complementing TNA's first Knockouts women's title. The title is also separate from the TNA Digital Media Championship (established September 30, 2021), which is an intergender championship that was inaugurally won by Knockout Jordynne Grace.) Two DVDs on the topic of the TNA Knockouts have been released by TNA. The first was named Knockouts: The Ladies of TNA Wrestling Vol.1 and was released on August 29, 2006. Knocked Out: The Women of TNA Wrestling was the second, released on October 7, 2008.

=== Creation ===
TNA first announced in early September 2007 through their TNA Mobile service that they planned to start an official women's division and debut a women's title soon. Later that month, TNA began to promote a 10 knockout gauntlet match to be held on October 14, 2007 at TNA's Bound for Glory PPV event to crown the first-ever TNA Women's Champion. At the event, Gail Kim defeated Ms. Brooks, Christy Hemme, Awesome Kong, Roxxi Laveaux, Talia Madison, Shelly Martinez, Jackie Moore, ODB, and Angel Williams to become the first champion. The championship was renamed in 2008 to the TNA Women's Knockout Championship until 2010 when it became simply known as the TNA Knockouts Championship.

== Championship Tournament(s) ==
=== Impact Knockouts Championship Tournament (2017) ===
On November 23, 2017, it was announced after Gail Kim retired and vacated the Impact Knockouts Championship that a 6-woman tournament would be held to determine the new Knockouts Champion.

Semifinals
Laurel Van Ness	Pin
Madison Rayne	—
KC Spinelli	5:43
Sienna	—
Allie	6:16
Rosemary	Pin

Final
Laurel Van Ness	Pin
Rosemary	13:00

== Championship belt designs ==
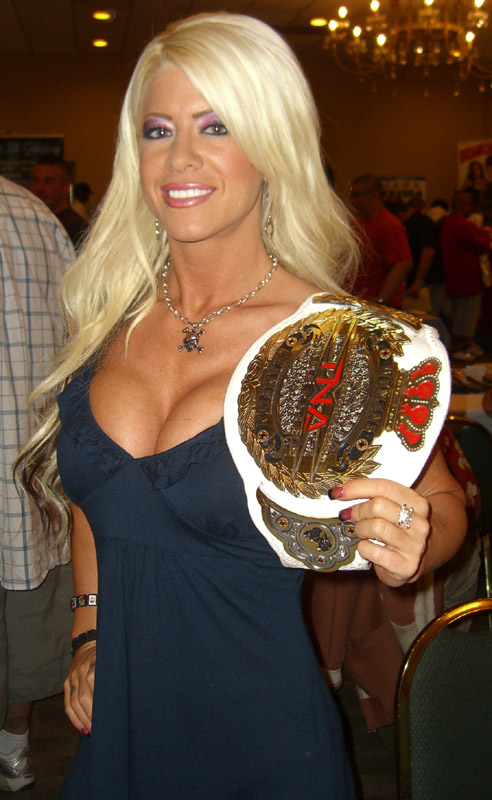
Six-time champion Angelina Love holding the original title design (2007–2014)

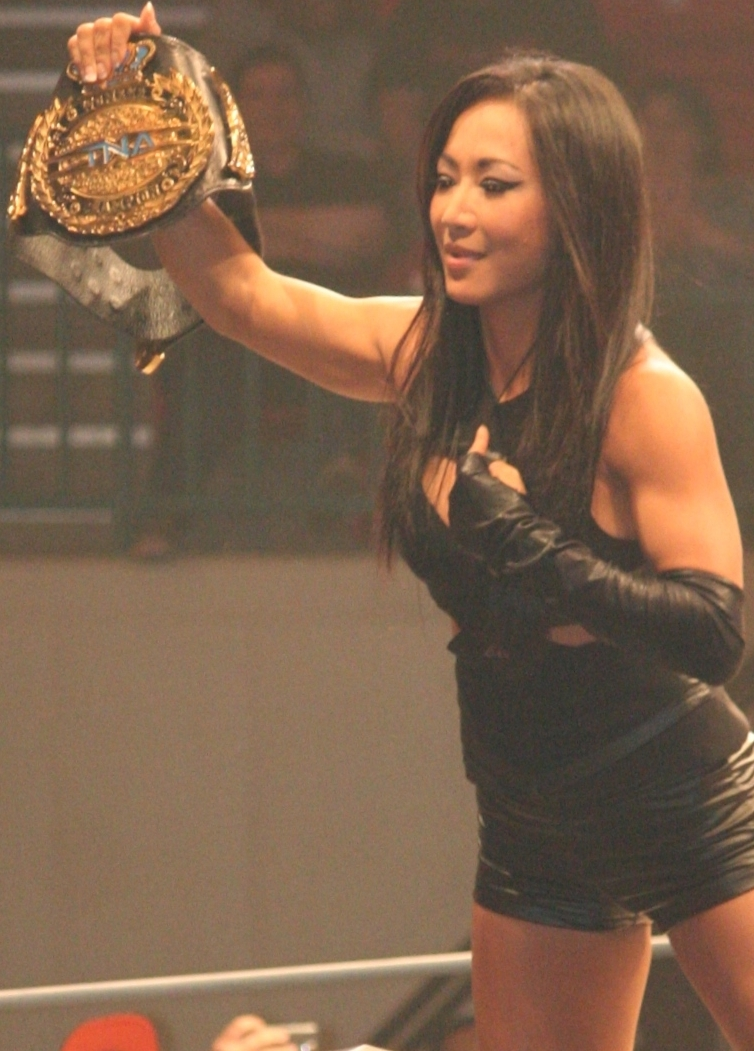
Gail Kim with the black-strap variant of the original design (2014–2016)

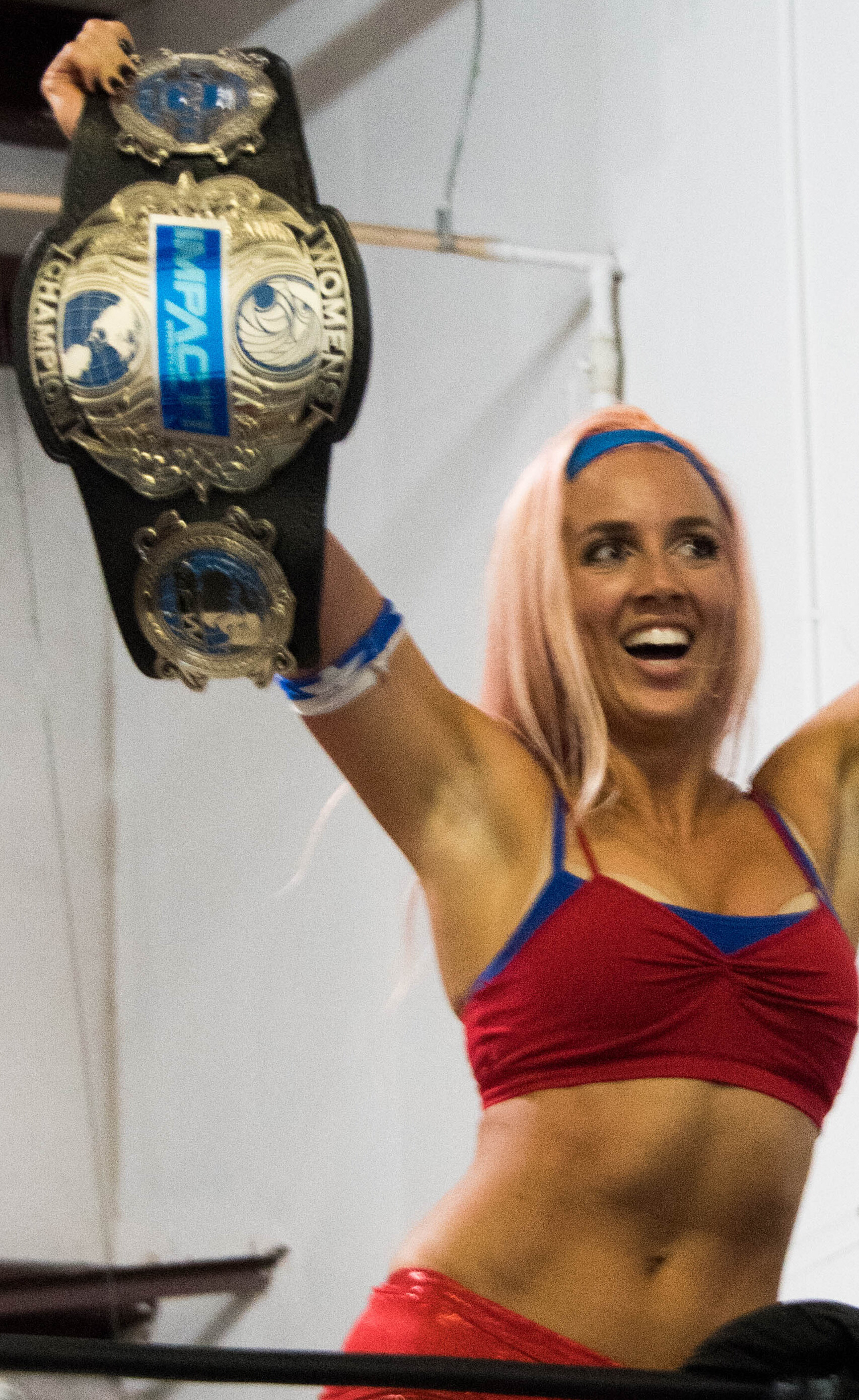
Laurel Van Ness with the second design (2016–2017)

Throughout its history, the Knockouts Championship has featured four distinct belt designs and three recognized variants.

The first design, introduced at Bound for Glory 2007, featured a white leather strap with dual-tone gold and silver plates, red gem accents, and a crown motif atop the center plate. The center plate displayed the red "TNA" logo with the words "Women's" and "Champion" engraved above and below it respectively. Notably, the term "Knockout" did not appear anywhere on the title.

In December 2014, TNA unveiled an updated variant of this design via its official Instagram account. The championship now featured a black leather strap with blue color accents to match the company’s branding. The plates were refinished in full gold, removing the silver inlays, though the overall design and structure remained unchanged.

Upon the titles unification with the Global Force Wrestling (GFW) Women's Championship, it adopted a re-coloured version of that belt as Impact began to re-brand as GFW. The GFW logo in the center plate was later covered with an Impact Wrestling relief plate after the company reverted to the Impact name.

At Redemption, a third design was unveiled. It featured new silver plates with blue detailing, the Impact Wrestling logo in the center, and side plates displaying the company’s owl symbol and the letters "KO". In January 2020, the belt was recolored with red enamel and a darker metallic finish to match the company’s refreshed branding. The 2018 design—along with its 2020 red variant—remained in use until January 2024.

At Hard to Kill 2024, the current fourth design was introduced following the company’s reversion to the TNA Wrestling name. This version pays homage to the original 2007 title, returning to a white leather strap with taller gold plates, red accents, and two additional side plates—one on each end. The modern TNA Wrestling logo replaces the former crown motif atop the center plate.

== Reigns ==
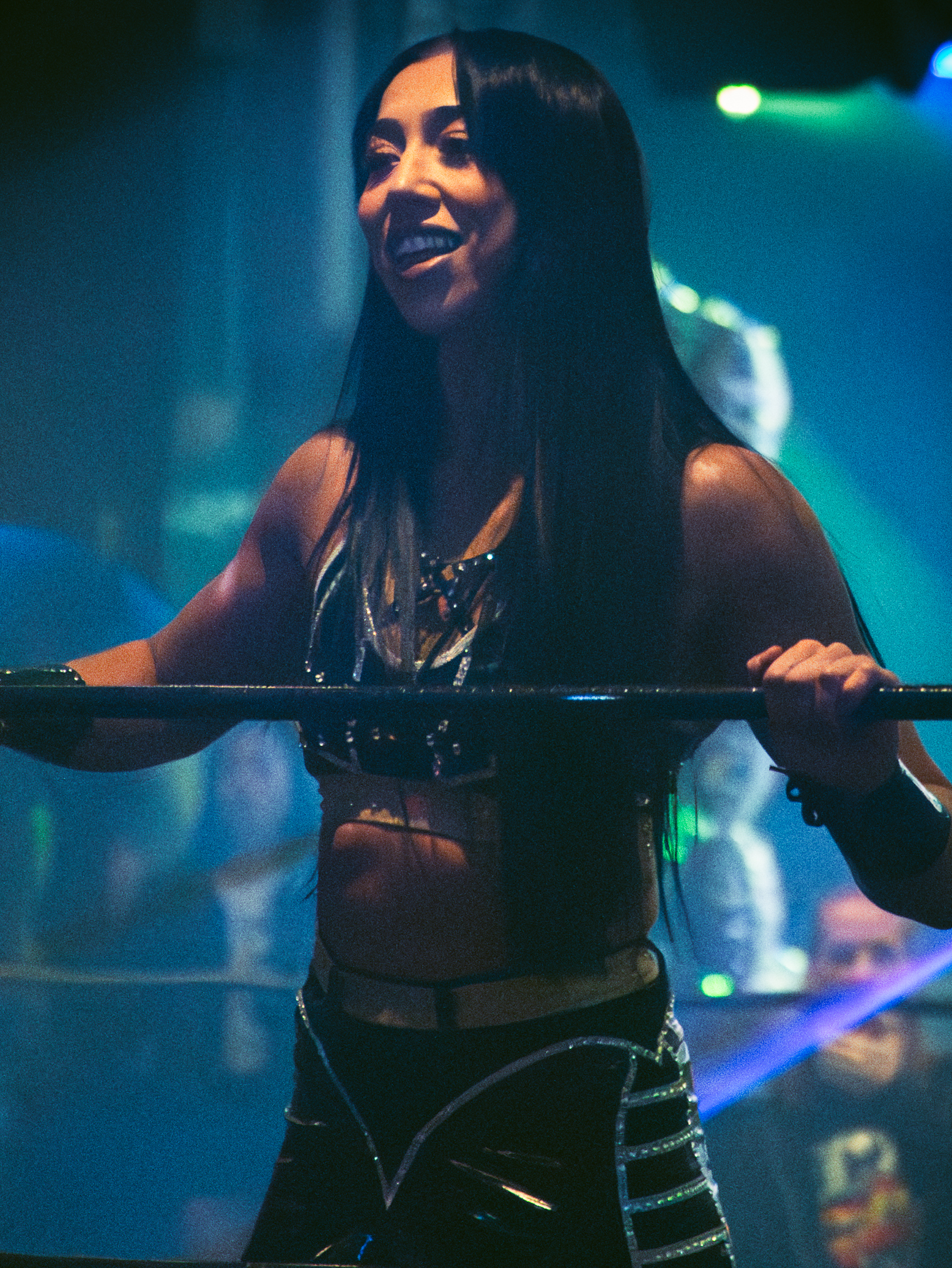
Current champion Indi Hartwell

As of November 5, 2026, there have been 73 reigns among 34 champions with five vacancies. The inaugural champion was Gail Kim, who defeated Ms. Brooks, Christy Hemme, Awesome Kong, Roxxi Laveaux, Velvet Sky, Shelly Martinez, Jackie Moore, ODB, and Angelina Love in a ten Knockout Gauntlet for the Gold match on October 24, 2007, at TNA's Bound for Glory PPV event. She also holds the record for the most reigns, with seven. Kim also holds the record for shortest reign in the title's history, during her seventh reign at 18 hours, while Taya Valkyrie's reign holds the record for longest in the title's history, with 377 days.

Indi Hartwell is the current champion in her first reign. She won the title by defeating Xia Brookside at Bound for Glory on October 11, 2026, in Tampa, Florida.

== See also ==
- List of current champions in Total Nonstop Action Wrestling
- World Women's Championship (disambiguation)
