= The Green Regime =

American professional wrestling tag team

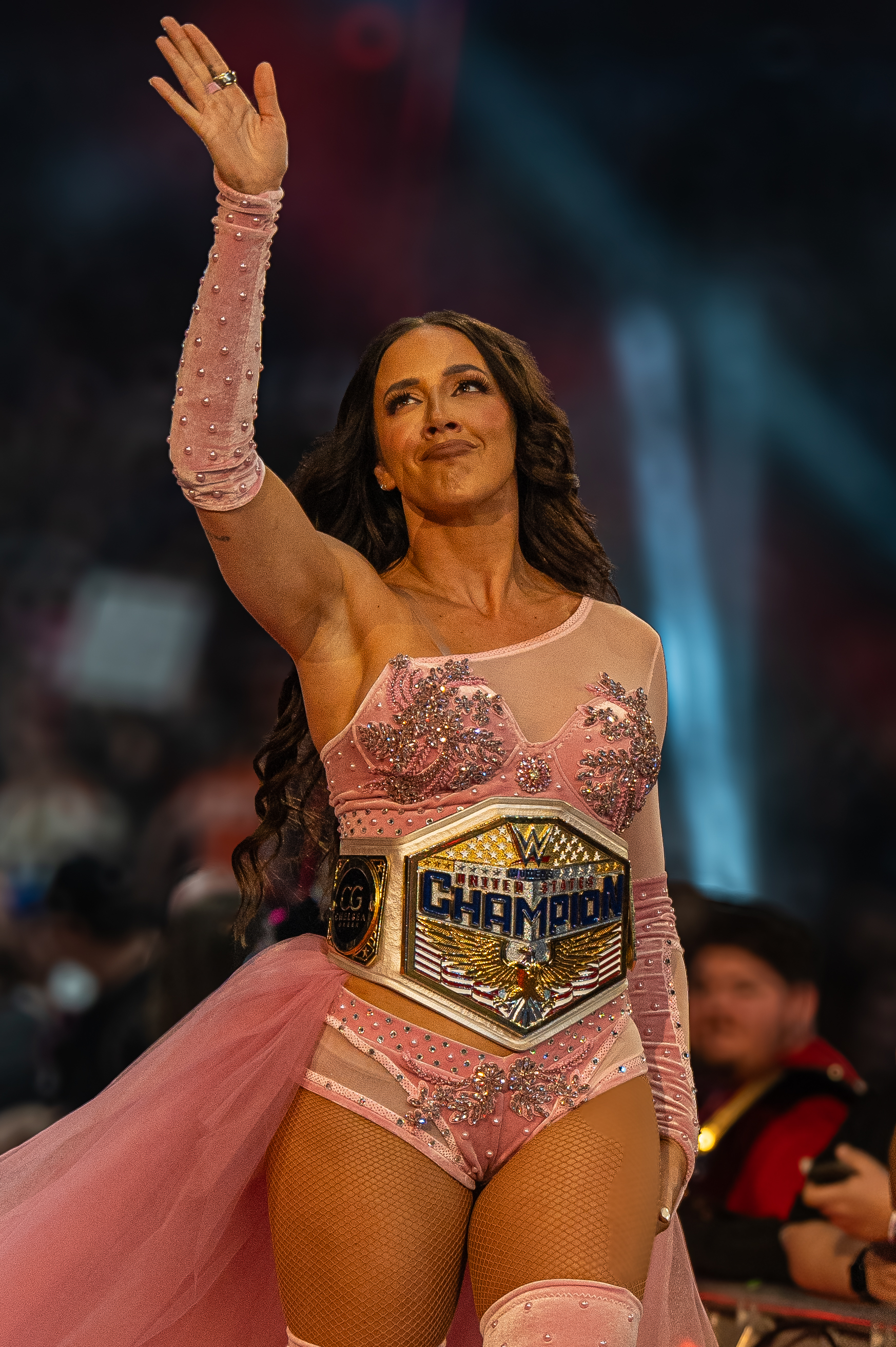
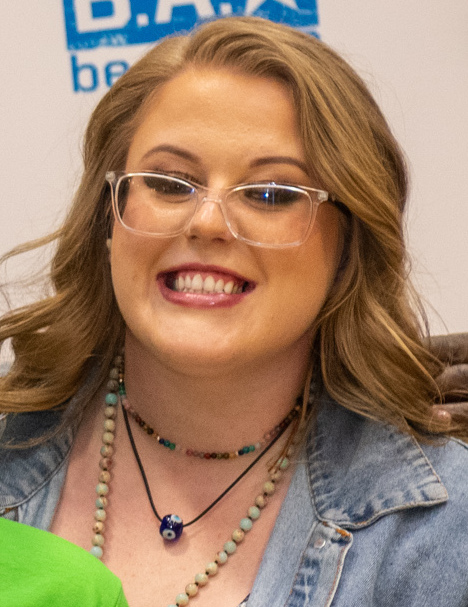
- Chelsea Green (left) and Piper Niven (right)

Tag team
- Name(s): Chelsea Green and Piper Niven; The Green Regime
- Leader: Chelsea Green
- Members: Piper Niven
- Billed heights: Green: 5 ft 7 in (1.70 m); Niven: 5 ft 8 in (1.73 m); Fyre: 5 ft 8 in (1.73 m)
- Former members: Alba Fyre
- Debut: August 14, 2023
- Years active: 2023–present

The Green Regime is a professional wrestling tag team performing in WWE on the SmackDown brand. The team is composed of leader, Chelsea Green, and Piper Niven. Green is a former two-time and the inaugural WWE Women's United States Champion and a former WWE Women's Champion , while Green and Niven are one-time WWE Women's Tag Team Champions.

In August 2023, Green and Niven formed a tag team to defend the WWE Women's Tag Team Championships, with Niven replacing Green's former tag team partner Sonya Deville who had suffered an injury and had to relinquish her half of the titles. In December 2024, Green became the inaugural Women's United States Champion and formed The Green Regime stable with the addition of Alba Fyre, who left the group in April 2026 after departing WWE. Since Fyre's departure and Niven's 2025 injury, the group as been on hiatus.

== History ==
=== Green and Niven tag team partnership (2023–2024) ===
On the July 17, 2023 episode of Raw, Chelsea Green and Sonya Deville defeated Liv Morgan and Raquel Rodriguez to win the WWE Women's Tag Team Championship. On August 7, however, Deville was reported to have suffered an ACL injury and had to relinquish her half of the title. On the August 14 episode of Raw, despite Green wanting to hold auditions for a new tag team partner, a returning Piper Niven took her half of the tag team titles and declared she would be Green’s new partner. Although Chelsea has touted herself as a two-time champion, WWE recognizes this change as a continuation of Green's original title reign with Deville and ending Green's reign with Deville at 28 days. On October 31 at Night 2 of NXT: Halloween Havoc, Green and Niven defeated Chase University (Thea Hail and Jacy Jayne) to successfully retain their titles. On the December 18 episode of Raw, Green and Niven lost the titles to Kayden Carter and Katana Chance, ending their reign at 126 days and Green's individual reign at 154 days. On the January 8, 2024 episode of Raw, Green and Niven failed to regain the titles in a rematch.

At Night 2 of the 2024 WWE Draft, Green and Niven were drafted to the SmackDown brand. At Clash at the Castle: Scotland on June 15, Niven faced Bayley for the WWE Women's Championship but failed to win the title despite interference from Green. On November 2 at Crown Jewel, Green and Niven battled in a fatal four-way tag team match for the WWE Women’s Tag Team Championship but they lost.

=== The Green Regime (2024–present) ===
On December 14, Green became the inaugural Women's United States Champion at Saturday Night's Main Event XXXVII. After the title win, Green took on the gimmick of the United States's "head of state" with Niven acting as Green's bodyguard (dubbed as Green's Secret Hervice, a pun on Secret Service). On the March 8, 2025 episode of SmackDown, Alba Fyre joined the stable after assisting Green to defend the Women's United States Championship against Michin in a Philadelphia Street Fight match. As a result, The Green Regime stable was formed and Fyre joining Niven as part of The Secret Hervice tag team. On the April 25 episode of SmackDown, Green lost the title to Zelina Vega, ending her reign at 132 days. In August, The Green Regime appeared on NXT to aid the NXT North American Champion Ethan Page in his feud against Tavion Heights and Tyra Mae Steele, with Green and Page emerged victorious at NXT Heatwave in a mixed tag team match. In the following month, it was reported that Niven had suffered a serious neck injury, putting her out of action indefinitely. At Lucha Libre AAA Worldwide (AAA) Day of the Dead on November 2, Green and Page defeated La Hiedra and Mr. Iguana to win the AAA World Mixed Tag Team Championship. Five days later on SmackDown, Green defeated Giulia to win her second Women's United States Championship. Green lost the title back to Giulia on the January 2, 2026 episode of SmackDown, ending her second reign at 56 days. On the February 7, 2026 episode of AAA on Fox, Page and La Hiedra, whom was substituting for Green due to an injury, lost the AAA World Mixed Tag Team Championship to Mr. Iguana and Lola Vice, ending their reign at 97 days. On April 24, Fyre was released by WWE.

After the departure of Fyre from WWE in April 2026 and the injury of Niven in late 2025, Green formed an alliance with Tiffany Stratton, turning face for the first time since 2022. At Night 2 of SummerSlam on August 2, Green defeated Stratton, Jade Cargill, Charlotte Flair and Lash Legend in a five-way Ladder match to win the Interim WWE Women's Championship, due to lineal champion Rhea Ripley being out with an injury. WWE later recognizes her reign as the lineal reign beginning on August 2. On the August 7 episode of SmackDown, Green and Stratton challenged Fatal Influence (Fallon Henley and Lainey Reid) for the WWE Women's Tag Team Championship in a losing effort. After the match, however, Green suffered a legitimate injury in her orbital bone. The following week on SmackDown, SmackDown General Manager Nick Aldis asked Green to relinquish the title as she was not medically cleared to compete, but Green relented. Aldis then gave Green thirty days to get cleared and defend the title.

On September 11, 2026, WWE retroactively ended Ripley's reign on August 2 and Green was recognized as the lineal champion. On the September 11 episode of SmackDown, Green defended her title within the allotted 30-day period when she defeated Nia Jax to retain the title.

== Members ==
*	Founding member
L	Leader

=== Current ===
Member		Joined
Chelsea Green (L)	*	August 14, 2023
Piper Niven	*	August 14, 2023

=== Former ===
Member	Joined	Left
Alba Fyre	March 8, 2025	April 24, 2026

== Sub-groups ==
Affiliate	Members	Tenure	Type
The Secret Hervice	Piper Niven; Alba Fyre	2025–2026	Tag team

== Championships and accomplishments ==
- Lucha Libre AAA Worldwide
  - AAA World Mixed Tag Team Championship (1 time) – Green with Ethan Page
- WWE
  - WWE Women's United States Championship (2 times, inaugural) – Green
  - WWE Women's Tag Team Championship (1 time) – Green and Niven
  - WWE Women’s United States Championship Tournament (2024) – Green
  - WWE Women's Speed Championship #1 Contender Tournament (2025) – Fyre
  - WWE Women's Championship (1 time) - Green
