= Royal Rumble (2025) =

WWE premium live event

- Promotional poster featuring various WWE wrestlers
- Promotion: WWE
- Brand(s): Raw; SmackDown; NXT
- Date: February 1, 2025
- City: Indianapolis, Indiana
- Venue: Lucas Oil Stadium
- Attendance: 70,343

WWE event chronology
← Previous; Saturday Night's Main Event XXXVIII	Next → NXT Vengeance Day

Royal Rumble chronology
← Previous; 2024	Next → 2026

The 2025 Royal Rumble, also promoted as Royal Rumble: Indianapolis, was a professional wrestling premium live event (PLE) produced by WWE, held for wrestlers from the promotion's Raw, SmackDown, and NXT brand divisions. It was the 38th annual Royal Rumble event and took place on Saturday, February 1, 2025, at Lucas Oil Stadium in Indianapolis, Indiana. This was the first Royal Rumble to not take place during the month of January, and also WWE's first PLE to air on Netflix in most markets outside the United States, following the WWE Network's merger under the service in January 2025 in those affected areas. It was also the first Royal Rumble to be held in an active National Football League stadium.

The event was based around the Royal Rumble match, a modified 30-person battle royal in which the participants enter at timed intervals instead of all beginning in the ring at the same time and the respective men's and women's winners received a world championship match at WrestleMania. For the 2025 event, the men's and women's winners received a choice of which championship to challenge for at WrestleMania 41. The men's winner could choose to challenge for either Raw's World Heavyweight Championship or SmackDown's Undisputed WWE Championship, while the women's winner had the choice between Raw's Women's World Championship and SmackDown's WWE Women's Championship. The 2025 Men's Royal Rumble match, which was the main event of the card, was won by Raw's Jey Uso, who last eliminated John Cena. The match also set the record for the longest Royal Rumble match ever held at 1:20:15. The 2025 Women's Royal Rumble match, which was the opening bout, was won by SmackDown's Charlotte Flair, who last eliminated NXT's Roxanne Perez, becoming the first woman to win two Royal Rumble matches, first winning it in 2020. Also in that match, Perez set the record for the longest time spent in a single women's Royal Rumble at 1:07:47 while Nia Jax set the record for most eliminations in a single women's Royal Rumble at nine.

In addition to the two Royal Rumble matches, two other matches were contested on the card, which were for SmackDown championships. In the first, #DIY (Johnny Gargano and Tommaso Ciampa) defeated The Motor City Machine Guns (Alex Shelley and Chris Sabin) by 2–1 in a two out of three falls match to retain the WWE Tag Team Championship, while Cody Rhodes defeated Kevin Owens in a Ladder match to retain the Undisputed WWE Championship. The event also saw the returns of Charlotte Flair, Alexa Bliss, Nikki Bella, AJ Styles, and Trish Stratus, the first match of former Total Nonstop Action Wrestling (TNA) wrestler Jordynne Grace under a WWE contract, and an appearance by TNA World Champion Joe Hendry. This was also the final Royal Rumble appearance of John Cena as an in-ring performer due to his retirement from professional wrestling at the end of 2025.

== Production ==
=== Background ===
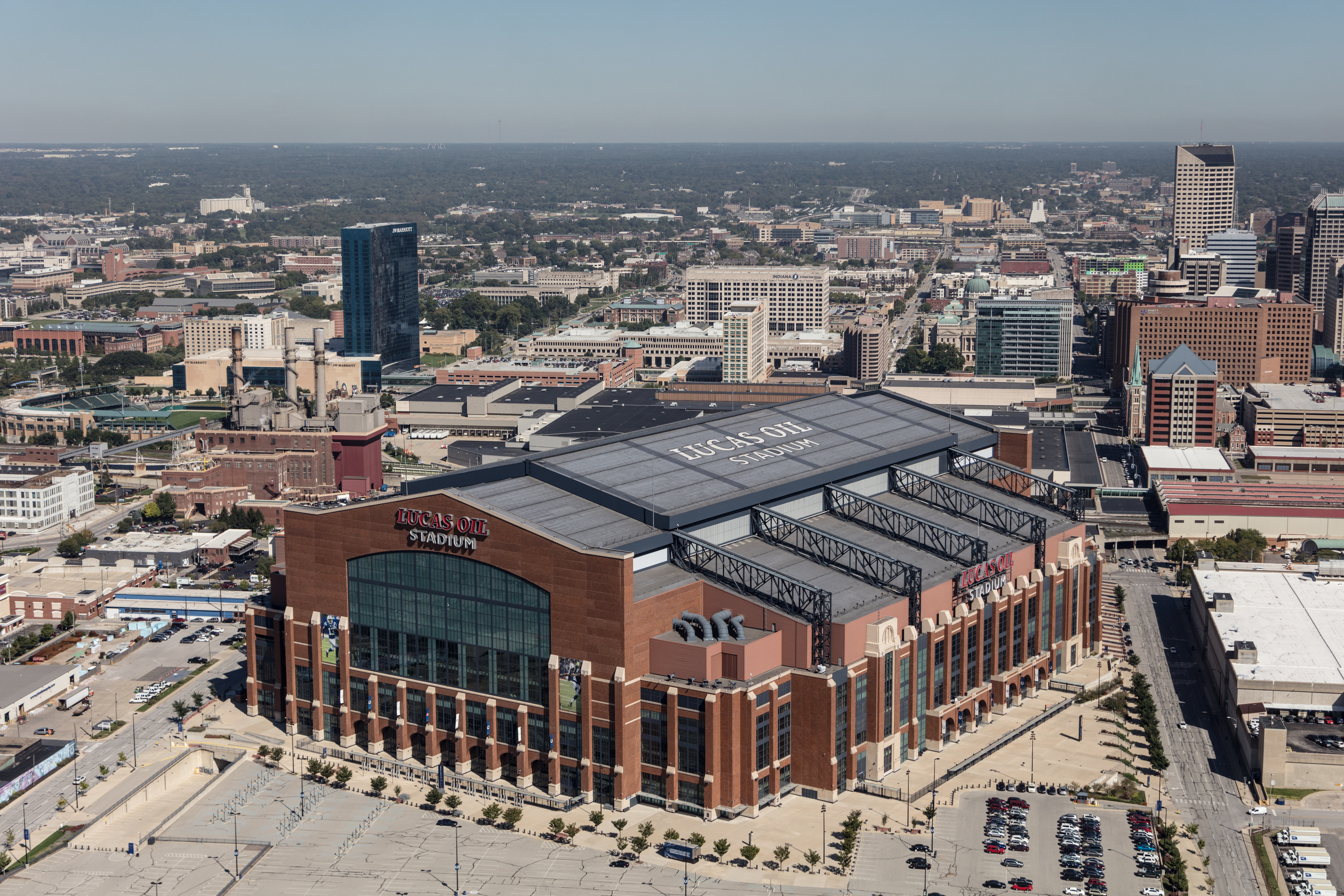
The 38th annual Royal Rumble event was held at the Lucas Oil Stadium in Indianapolis, Indiana, which was the first Royal Rumble hosted in an active National Football League stadium.

The Royal Rumble is an annual professional wrestling premium live event (PLE), originally produced every January by WWE since 1988; that first event was a television special before it became a pay-per-view (PPV) event beginning in 1989 and then also simulcast on WWE's livestreaming platforms since 2015. It is one of the promotion's original four PPVs, along with WrestleMania, SummerSlam, and Survivor Series, referred to as the "Big Four", and as of August 2021, it is considered one of the "Big Five", along with Money in the Bank. It is named after and centered on the Royal Rumble match.

From the event's inception in 1988 up through the 2024 event, the Royal Rumble was held annually in late January. On June 24, 2024, WWE announced a partnership with the Indiana Sports Corp. which would see the 2025 Royal Rumble, as well as a future WrestleMania and a future SummerSlam, held at the Lucas Oil Stadium in Indianapolis, Indiana, subsequently marking the first Royal Rumble to be held in an active National Football League (NFL) stadium. The date for the 38th Royal Rumble was announced for Saturday, February 1, 2025, thus marking the first Royal Rumble held outside of January. The event primarily featured wrestlers from the Raw and SmackDown brand divisions, but with a select few NXT wrestlers, veterans, and other surprise entrants also participating in the Rumble matches. Tickets went on sale on November 15, 2024. The official theme songs of the event were "Von Dutch" by Charli XCX and "Even If It Kills Me" by Papa Roach.

The Royal Rumble match is a modified battle royal in which the participants enter at timed intervals instead of all beginning in the ring at the same time, and the match generally features 30 wrestlers. Since 1993, the winner traditionally earns a world championship match at that year's WrestleMania. For 2025, the men and women could choose to challenge for either Raw or SmackDown's top championship at WrestleMania 41: the men had their choice between Raw's World Heavyweight Championship Championship or SmackDown's Undisputed WWE Championship, while the women could choose either Raw's Women's World Championship or SmackDown's WWE Women's Championship.

=== Broadcast outlets ===
The PLE was broadcast on traditional PPV outlets worldwide. It was also available to livestream on Peacock in the United States, SonyLIV in India, SuperSport in Sub-Saharan Africa, Disney+ in the Philippines, Abema in Japan, Netflix in most other international markets, and the WWE Network in a select few countries that had not yet transferred to Netflix due to pre-existing contracts. This marked the first Royal Rumble, and WWE's first PLE, to livestream on Netflix following the WWE Network's merger under the service in January 2025 in those areas.

On January 9, 2025, WWE announced a multi-year deal with Cosm in which select WWE PLEs would be broadcast from Cosm's "shared reality" immersive 87-foot-diameter LED domes, with locations in Los Angeles, California and Dallas, Texas (similar to Las Vegas's Sphere). WWE's first PLE to be broadcast from Cosm's domes was the 2025 Royal Rumble.

=== Storylines ===
The event included matches that resulted from scripted storylines. Results were predetermined by WWE's writers on the Raw and SmackDown brands, while storylines were produced on WWE's weekly television shows, Monday Night Raw and Friday Night SmackDown.

On November 13, 2024, it was announced that John Cena would be competing at the Royal Rumble, which would in turn be his last Royal Rumble appearance as Cena announced at the 2024 Money in the Bank that he would be retiring at the end of 2025. During the Raw premiere on Netflix on January 6, 2025, Cena announced he would compete in the Royal Rumble match to try and earn an opportunity to win his 17th world championship at WrestleMania 41.

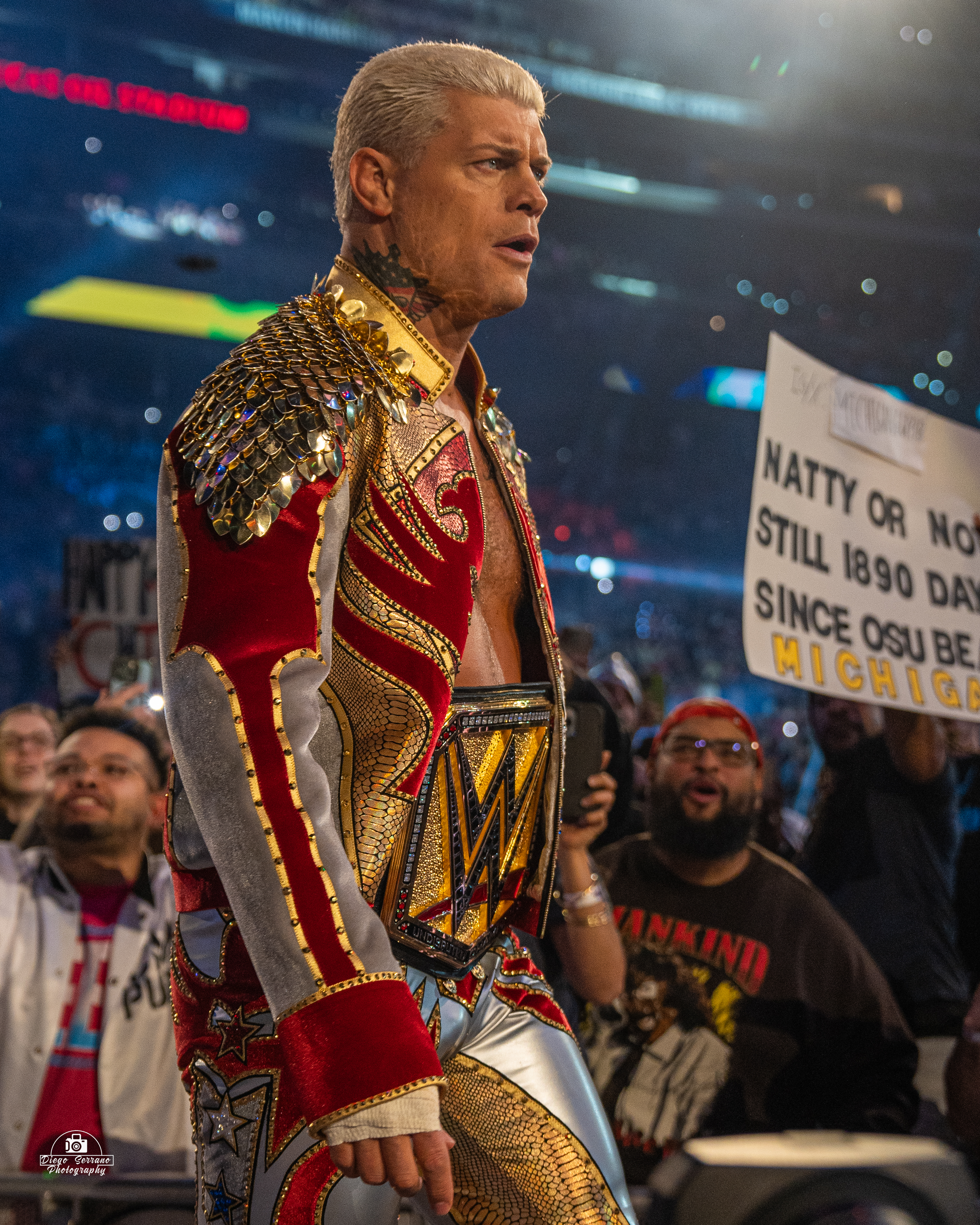
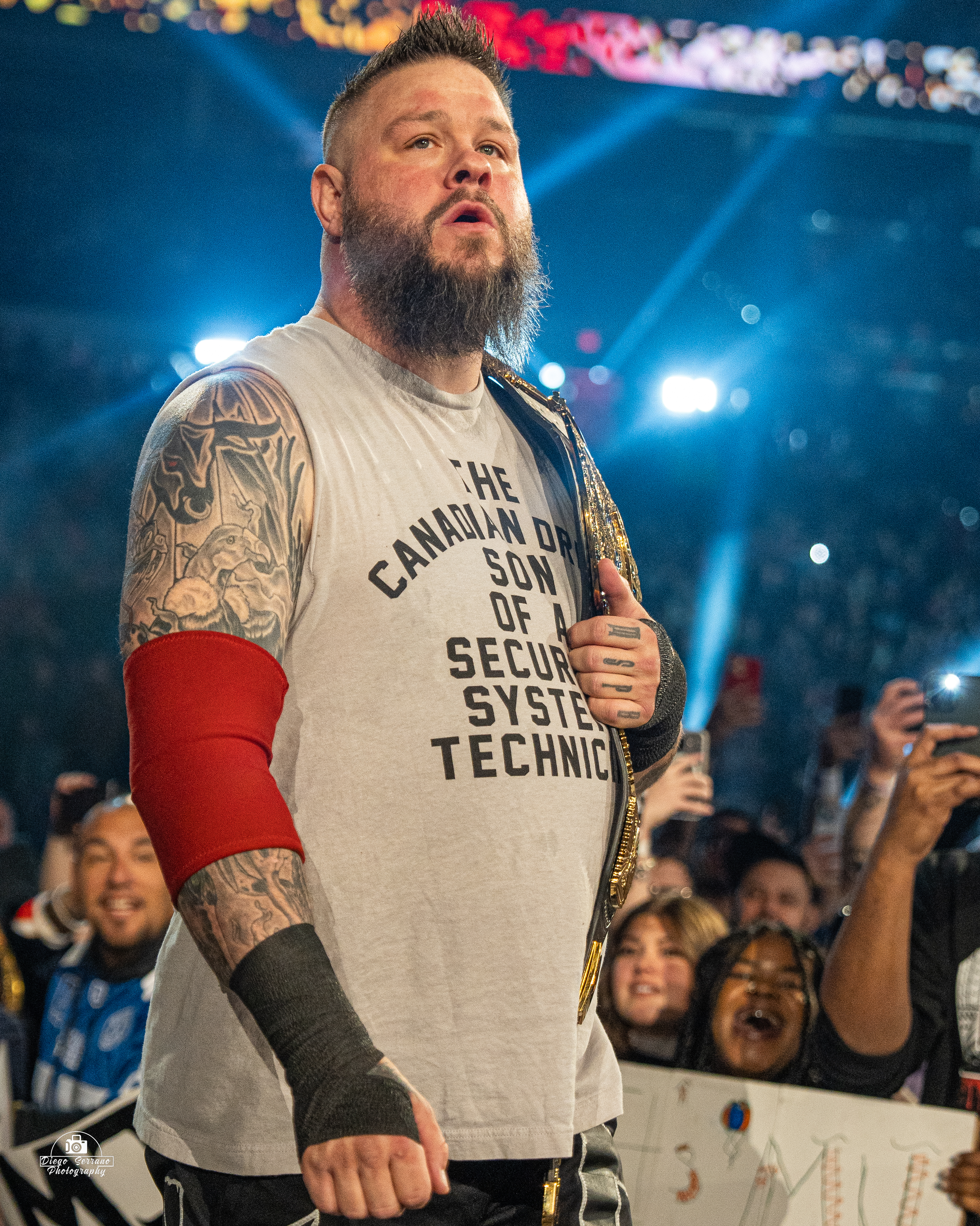
Cody Rhodes defended SmackDown's Undisputed WWE Championship in a ladder match against Kevin Owens, who had stolen the "Winged Eagle" version of the championship belt as he claimed he was the "true champion" following their match at Saturday Night's Main Event XXXVII.

At Bad Blood in October 2024, Undisputed WWE Champion Cody Rhodes set aside his differences with longtime rival Roman Reigns to face The Bloodline (Solo Sikoa and Jacob Fatu), which was won by Rhodes and Reigns. Following the event, fans captured footage of Kevin Owens having an altercation with Rhodes in the parking lot as he was entering his bus, which culminated with Owens attacking Rhodes, thus turning heel. Owens considered Rhodes teaming with Reigns as a betrayal due to Owens's past issues with Reigns and the original Bloodline. Rhodes and Owens eventually faced each other at Saturday Night's Main Event XXXVII on December 14 for the title and due to the 1980s retro theme of the event, Rhodes wore the "Winged Eagle" version of the WWE Championship belt. During the match, Owens performed a Stunner on Rhodes and pinned him, which lasted more than 3 seconds, but the referee had inadvertently been knocked out of the ring when Owens had hit the Stunner. While the referee was still incapacitated, Owens grabbed a chair and attempted to attack Rhodes only for Rhodes to seize it and perform a Cross Rhodes on Owens onto the chair. The referee subsequently recovered and counted the pin, thus Rhodes retained the title. After the event went off the air, Owens attacked Rhodes with a package piledriver and stole the Winged Eagle belt, subsequently claiming to be the "true champion". On the December 27 episode of SmackDown, the brand's general manager Nick Aldis demanded that Owens return the Winged Eagle belt or be fired. Owens stated that he would only give it back if he received a rematch against Rhodes. Aldis declined and said that the demand was non-negotiable. Rhodes interrupted and stated that he did not want Owens to return it as he wanted a chance at revenge on Owens and take it back himself, thus challenging Owens to a rematch as a ladder match at the Royal Rumble with both the Undisputed and Winged Eagle belts suspended above the ring, which Aldis reluctantly made official.

After losing the WWE Tag Team Championship in August 2024, #DIY (Tommaso Ciampa and Johnny Gargano) vowed to do whatever it took to regain the title. However, during this time, there were signs of dissension between Ciampa and Gargano as the former took on a more aggressive character. On the November 15 episode of SmackDown, Ciampa interrupted a title match between The Street Profits (Angelo Dawkins and Montez Ford) and defending champions The Motor City Machine Guns (Alex Shelley and Chris Sabin), attacking both teams as Gargano tried to calm him down, further teasing the team's dissension. On the December 6 episode, #DIY defeated Motor City Machine Guns to regain the title after Gargano hit Sabin with a low blow, revealing that the dissension was a ruse, turning both men heel in the process. A rematch between the two teams took place on the January 3, 2025, episode, but the match ended in a no contest after a brawl between Los Garza (Angel and Berto) and Pretty Deadly (Elton Prince and Kit Wilson) spilled into the ring. On the January 17 episode, Motor City Machine Guns defeated Los Garza, and then Pretty Deadly the following week. Later that night, Motor City Machine Guns announced that #DIY would defend the title against them at the Royal Rumble in a two out of three falls match, which was made official.

== Event ==
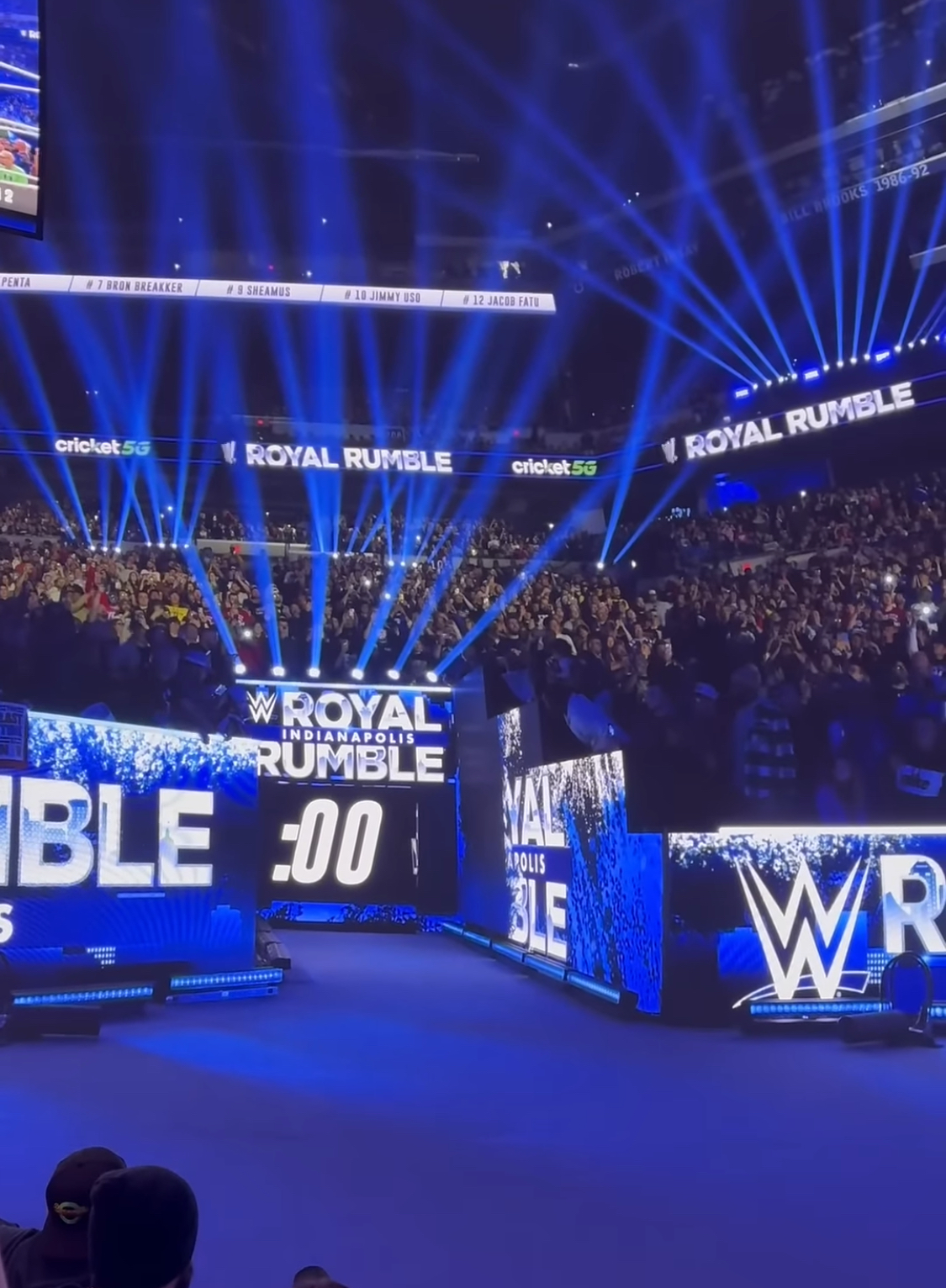
Royal Rumble stage.

Other on-screen personnel
Role:	Name:
English commentators	Michael Cole
English commentators	Wade Barrett
English commentators	Pat McAfee
Spanish commentators	Marcelo Rodríguez
Spanish commentators	Jerry Soto
Ring announcer	Alicia Taylor
Referees	Danilo Anfibio
Referees	Shawn Bennett
Referees	Jessika Carr
Referees	Dan Engler
Referees	Daphanie LaShaunn
Referees	Eddie Orengo
Referees	Chad Patton
Referees	Charles Robinson
Referees	Ryan Tran
Referees	Rod Zapata
Interviewers	Cathy Kelley
Interviewers	Byron Saxton
Pre-show panel	Jackie Redmond
Pre-show panel	Big E
Pre-show panel	Joe Tessitore
Pre-show panel	Peter Rosenberg
Pre-show panel	Bubba Ray Dudley

=== Preliminary matches ===
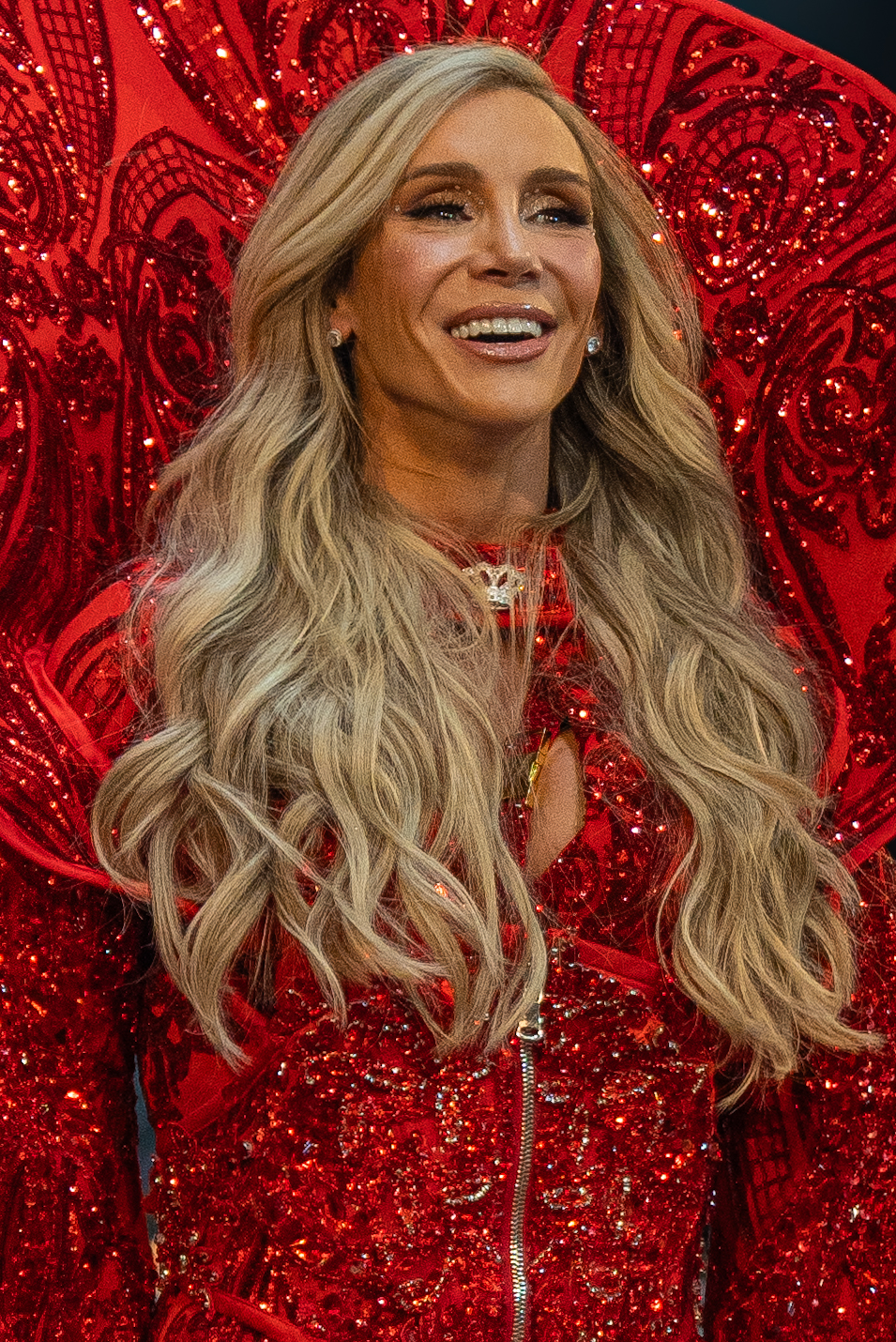
In winning the 2025 Women's Royal Rumble match, Charlotte Flair became the first woman to win multiple Royal Rumble matches, after her first win in 2020.

The PLE opened with the Women's Royal Rumble match. Iyo Sky and Liv Morgan started the match at #1 and #2, respectively. Several entered the match from NXT: Roxanne Perez (#3), Lash Legend (#9), Jaida Parker (#16), Stephanie Vaquer (#24), and NXT Women's Champion Giulia (#28). Also in the match were the two main roster secondary champions: Raw's Women's Intercontinental Champion Lyra Valkyria (#4) and SmackDown's Women's United States Champion Chelsea Green (#5). Former Total Nonstop Action Wrestling (TNA) wrestler Jordynne Grace, who had just signed a multi-year contract with WWE, entered the match at #19, marking her first official match as a WWE wrestler. There were also several returns: Alexa Bliss (#21), who had been out for two years on maternity leave, Charlotte Flair (#27), whose return was announced a couple weeks beforehand on SmackDown, and WWE Hall of Famers Trish Stratus (#25) and Nikki Bella (#30). Nia Jax (#29) set the record for the most eliminations in a single women's Royal Rumble match at nine, eliminating Sky, Morgan, WWE Women's Tag Team Champions Bianca Belair (#10) and Naomi (#15), Zelina Vega (#22), Vaquer, Stratus, Raquel Rodriguez (#26), and Bella. The final four were Flair, Bella, Perez, and Jax. In the closing moments, after Jax eliminated Bella, Flair eliminated Jax. Flair then eliminated Perez to win the match, earning a world title match at WrestleMania 41 and becoming the first woman to win two Royal Rumbles, previously winning in 2020. Perez also set the record for the longest time spent in a single Women's Rumble match at 1:07:47.

Next, #DIY (Tommaso Ciampa and Johnny Gargano) defended the WWE Tag Team Championship against The Motor City Machine Guns (Alex Shelley and Chris Sabin) in a two out of three falls match. #DIY got the first fall after Ciampa pinned Shelley after a running knee strike. The Motor Machine Guns tied up the falls after Shelley pinned Gargano after Skull and Bones. As The Motor Machine Guns set up for Skull and Bones again, two hooded figures appeared, which caused a distraction, allowing #DIY to hit Meet in the Middle, and Ciampa pinned Shelley to retain the titles. After the match, The Street Profits (Angelo Dawkins and Montez Ford) revealed themselves as the hooded figures and laid out both teams.

In the penultimate match, Cody Rhodes defended the Undisputed WWE Championship against Kevin Owens in a Ladder match, with both the Undisputed and Winged Eagle belts suspended above the ring. During the match, Owens attempted a Package Piledriver, but Rhodes countered, backdropping Owens onto a ladder. Owens hit a Fisherman's Buster Suplex to Rhodes onto a ladder bridged inside the ring, laying both men completely out as officials, as well as Sami Zayn, came out to check on them. The two continued until Owens attempted another Package Piledriver on the announce table, but Rhodes countered, driving Owens through a bridged ladder with an Alabama Slam. Cody then climbed the ladder and unhooked both championship belts to retain.

=== Main event ===
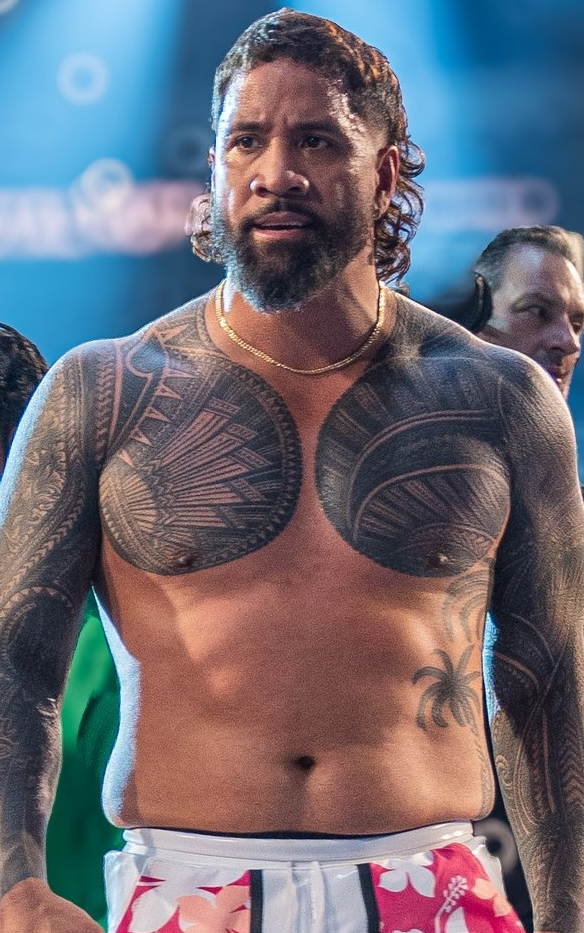
Jey Uso won the 2025 Men's Royal Rumble match.

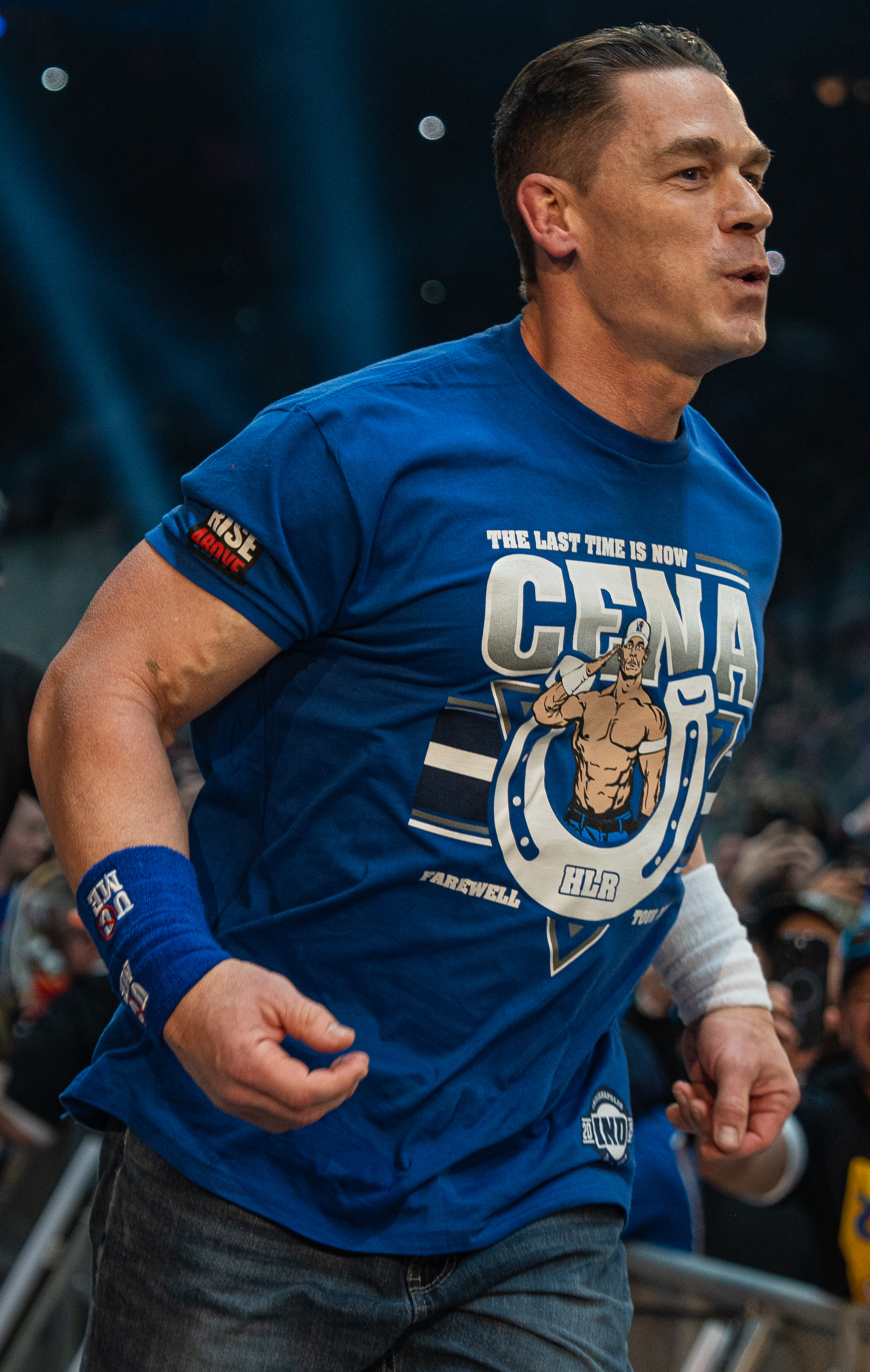
John Cena, the runner-up, wrestled in his final Royal Rumble match and event.

The main event was the Men's Royal Rumble match. Rey Mysterio and Penta started the match at #1 and #2, respectively. Akira Tozawa entered at #8 but was attacked by Carmelo Hayes (#4), who had just been eliminated; Tozawa was carried to the back and ruled unable to compete and was replaced by YouTuber and rapper IShowSpeed. Speed entered the match, but he was hit with a Spear by Raw's Intercontinental Champion Bron Breakker (#7) and was eliminated. TNA World Champion Joe Hendry (#15) entered the match as a surprise entrant. Roman Reigns entered at #16 and eliminated Breakker, Sheamus (#9), Hendry, and The Miz (#14). Drew McIntyre entered at #17 and SmackDown's United States Champion Shinsuke Nakamura entered at #19. AJ Styles returned from injury at #21. Braun Strowman entered at #22 and went right after Jacob Fatu (#12). Strowman would eliminate Fatu before he was eliminated by John Cena, who entered at #23. With Reigns and Cena having a standoff in the ring, CM Punk entered at #24 and had a three-way stare off until Seth "Freakin" Rollins entered at #25. Logan Paul was the final entrant at #30. With everybody down, Reigns and Rollins tried to eliminate each other, but Punk snuck up from behind and eliminated them both, who was subsequently eliminated by Paul. Outside the ring, Rollins delivered a Curb Stomp to Reigns and then began attacking Punk as officials tried to break the three men up. Rollins hit a second Curb Stomp to Reigns on the steel steps before storming off from ringside. The final three were Cena, Paul, and Jey Uso (#20). As Cena attempted the Attitude Adjustment on Paul, Jey hit a Superkick on Paul, followed by Cena clotheslining Paul over the top rope to eliminate him. Cena and Uso were fighting on the apron after going over the top rope. Uso hit a Superkick on Cena, who held on. Cena attempted the Attitude Adjustment, but Uso landed feet-first in the ring and then knocked Cena off the apron to win the match, earning a world title match at WrestleMania 41. At 1:20:15, this became the longest Royal Rumble match ever held.

== Reception ==
Writing for the Wrestling Observer Newsletter, wrestling journalist Dave Meltzer gave the Women's Royal Rumble match 3.5 stars and Men's Royal Rumble match 4.5 stars respectively, the WWE Tag Team Championship Two out of three falls match 3.25 stars, and the Undisputed WWE Championship Ladder match 4.5 stars.

== Aftermath ==
During the Royal Rumble post-show, John Cena announced that he would be participating in the men's Elimination Chamber match at Elimination Chamber as it would be his last time at an opportunity to compete for a world championship in the main event of a WrestleMania, claiming that it was "best for business".

=== Raw ===
After appearing on both Raw and SmackDown over the next week to make his decision, 2025 Men's Royal Rumble winner Jey Uso was attacked by World Heavyweight Champion Gunther on the February 10 episode of Raw. Uso subsequently declared that he would face Gunther for Raw's World Heavyweight Championship at WrestleMania 41, setting up a rematch from Saturday Night's Main Event XXXVIII.

Seth "Freakin" Rollins, CM Punk, and Roman Reigns would continue their rivalry. At Elimination Chamber, after Punk eliminated Rollins in the men's Elimination Chamber match, Rollins performed a Stomp on Punk, resulting in his elimination. This resulted in a Steel Cage match between the two being scheduled for the March 10 episode of Raw, where Rollins won after a returning Reigns pulled him out of the cage to attack him as revenge from the Royal Rumble. Afterwards, enraged by Heyman tending to Punk in the ring, Reigns also attacked Punk. On March 21, after a confrontation between Rollins, Punk, and Reigns on SmackDown that day, they were scheduled for a triple threat match at WrestleMania 41.

After being transferred to the Raw brand, AJ Styles would have various encounters with Logan Paul over the next few weeks and on the March 31 episode of Raw, they were scheduled for a match at WrestleMania 41.

=== SmackDown ===
After appearing on the following week's episodes of Raw, NXT, and SmackDown, 2025 Women's Royal Rumble winner Charlotte Flair confronted Tiffany Stratton following the latter's title defense on the February 14 episode of SmackDown and announced that she had chosen to challenge Stratton for SmackDown's WWE Women's Championship at WrestleMania 41. Also that same episode, Stratton retained the title against Jax after being attacked by Candice LeRae. Afterwards, LeRae and Jax attacked Stratton, prompting Trish Stratus, who was in the crowd, to come in and assist Stratton. This led to a tag team match pitting Stratton and Stratus against Jax and LeRae for Elimination Chamber.

In the tag team division, The Street Profits (Angelo Dawkins and Montez Ford) defeated #DIY (Johnny Gargano and Tommaso Ciampa) to win the WWE Tag Team Championship on the March 14 episode of SmackDown. On the April 4 episode, The Motor City Machine Guns (Alex Shelley and Chris Sabin) defeated #DIY in a rematch to become the number one contenders for the title. The title match took place on the April 18 episode, where The Street Profits won via disqualification after #DIY interfered and stole the title belts. As a result, a Tables, Ladders, and Chairs match between the three teams was scheduled for the following week, where The Street Profits retained.

=== Broadcasting changes ===
In continuing WWE's near worldwide transition to Netflix, this would be the final Royal Rumble to air on SonyLIV in India before migrating to Netflix on April 1. This would also be the final Royal Rumble to air on Disney+ in the Philippines before moving to Netflix on January 1, 2026. Throughout 2025, many of the select few countries that were still on the WWE Network due to pre-existing contracts gradually merged to Netflix with nearly all international markets on Netflix by January 1, 2026. Additionally, on August 6, 2025, WWE announced that ESPN's direct-to-consumer streaming service would assume the streaming rights of WWE's main roster PLEs in the United States. This was originally to begin with WrestleMania 42 in April 2026, but was pushed up to September 2025 with Wrestlepalooza. As such, this was the last Royal Rumble to livestream on Peacock in the US.

== Results ==
No.	Results	Stipulations	Times
1	Charlotte Flair won by last eliminating Roxanne Perez	30-woman Royal Rumble match for a world championship match at WrestleMania 41	1:10:20
2	#DIY (Johnny Gargano and Tommaso Ciampa) (c) defeated The Motor City Machine Guns (Alex Shelley and Chris Sabin) by 2–1	Two out of three falls match for the WWE Tag Team Championship	14:00
3	Cody Rhodes (c) defeated Kevin Owens by retrieving both championship belts	Ladder match for the Undisputed WWE Championship; The "Undisputed" and "Winged Eagle" championship belts were suspended above the ring and both had to be retrieved in order to win.	25:05
4	Jey Uso won by last eliminating John Cena	30-man Royal Rumble match for a world championship match at WrestleMania 41	1:20:15
(c) / – the champion(s) heading into the match

=== Women's Royal Rumble match entrances and eliminations ===
– Raw
– SmackDown
– NXT
– Hall of Famer (HOF)
– Unaffiliated
– Winner

Draw	Entrant	Brand/Status	Order	Eliminated by	Time	Elimination(s)
1	Iyo Sky	Raw	21	Nia Jax	1:06:45	1
2	Liv Morgan	Raw	24	Nia Jax	1:07:00	2
3	Roxanne Perez	NXT	29	Charlotte Flair	1:07:47 (Note: Iyo Sky broke the longevity record for the Women's Royal Rumble, previously held by Bayley who lasted 1:03:03 in 2024. This record was broken by Liv Morgan then Roxanne Perez less than a minute later)	1
4	Lyra Valkyria	Raw	2	Ivy Nile	16:13	0
5	Chelsea Green	SmackDown	9	Piper Niven	26:52	2
6	B-Fab	SmackDown	1	Chelsea Green	07:20	0
7	Ivy Nile	Raw	3	Maxxine Dupri	16:29	1
8	Zoey Stark	Raw	5	Bianca Belair and Naomi	16:58	1
9	Lash Legend	NXT	8	Chelsea Green	17:22	0
10	Bianca Belair	SmackDown	23	Nia Jax	49:17	1
11	Shayna Baszler	Raw	6	Bayley	10:12	1
12	Bayley	Raw	26	Nikki Bella	46:59	1
13	Sonya Deville	Raw	7	Iyo Sky	06:04	1
14	Maxxine Dupri	Raw	4	Pure Fusion Collective (Note: Team name for the group consisting of Shayna Baszler, Sonya Deville, and Zoey Stark.)	01:20	1
15	Naomi	SmackDown	20	Nia Jax	38:04	1
16	Jaida Parker	NXT	10	Jordynne Grace	06:54	0
17	Piper Niven	SmackDown	14	Charlotte Flair	24:10	1
18	Natalya	Raw	11	Liv Morgan	17:14	0
19	Jordynne Grace	Unaffiliated	15	Giulia	22:41	1
20	Michin	SmackDown	13	Charlotte Flair	16:59	0
21	Alexa Bliss	SmackDown	12	Liv Morgan	11:01	0
22	Zelina Vega	SmackDown	16	Nia Jax (Note: Jax had not entered the match yet before eliminating Vega.)	18:04	0
23	Candice LeRae	SmackDown	17	Trish Stratus	16:32	0
24	Stephanie Vaquer	NXT	19	Nia Jax	19:02	0
25	Trish Stratus	HOF	18	Nia Jax	13:13	1
26	Raquel Rodriguez	Raw	22	Nia Jax	15:02	0
27	Charlotte Flair	SmackDown	—	Winner (Note: First two-time Women's Rumble winner)	15:04	4
28	Giulia	NXT	25	Roxanne Perez	10:08	1
29	Nia Jax	SmackDown	28	Charlotte Flair	08:13	9
30	Nikki Bella	HOF	27	Nia Jax	03:04	1

=== Men’s Royal Rumble match entrances and eliminations ===
– Raw
– SmackDown
– Hall of Famer (HOF)
– TNA
– Celebrity entrant
– Unaffiliated
– Winner

Draw	Entrant	Brand/Status	Order	Eliminated by	Time	Elimination(s)
1	Rey Mysterio	Raw (HOF)	6	Jacob Fatu	24:41	0
2	Penta	Raw	14	Finn Bálor	42:05	1
3	Chad Gable	Raw	5	Jacob Fatu	21:38	0
4	Carmelo Hayes	SmackDown	1	Bron Breakker	06:59	0
5	Santos Escobar	SmackDown	2	Bron Breakker	05:42	0
6	Otis	Raw	3	Bron Breakker and IShowSpeed	09:43	1
7	Bron Breakker	Raw	12	Roman Reigns	22:26	3
8	IShowSpeed (Note: Replaced Akira Tozawa after Tozawa was attacked during his entrance by Carmelo Hayes.)	Celebrity	4	Otis (Note: Otis was already eliminated when he eliminated Speed.)	00:56	1
9	Sheamus	Raw	10	Roman Reigns	15:38	0
10	Jimmy Uso	SmackDown	13	Jacob Fatu	15:34	0
11	Andrade	SmackDown	7	Jacob Fatu	03:17	0
12	Jacob Fatu	SmackDown	16	Braun Strowman	24:16	4
13	Ludwig Kaiser	Raw	8	Penta	00:06	0
14	The Miz	SmackDown	9	Roman Reigns	05:25	0
15	Joe Hendry	TNA	11	Roman Reigns	03:35	0
16	Roman Reigns	SmackDown	26	CM Punk	37:15	4
17	Drew McIntyre	Raw	21	Damian Priest	26:55	0
18	Finn Bálor	Raw	18	John Cena	11:10	1
19	Shinsuke Nakamura	SmackDown	15	Jey Uso	03:17	0
20	Jey Uso	Raw	—	Winner	36:59	3
21	AJ Styles	SmackDown	24	Logan Paul	21:02	1
22	Braun Strowman	SmackDown	17	John Cena	02:12	1
23	John Cena	Unaffiliated	29	Jey Uso	30:31	3
24	CM Punk	Raw	27	Logan Paul	18:46	2
25	Seth "Freakin" Rollins	Raw	25	CM Punk	17:14	0
26	"Dirty" Dominik Mysterio	Raw	19	Damian Priest	04:09	0
27	Sami Zayn	Raw	20	Jey Uso	05:22	0
28	Damian Priest	SmackDown	22	LA Knight	06:14	2
29	LA Knight	SmackDown	23	AJ Styles	05:06	1
30	Logan Paul	Raw	28	John Cena	11:19	2
