= Saturday Night's Main Event XXXVII =

2024 WWE television special and livestreaming event

- Promotional poster featuring Cody Rhodes and Kevin Owens
- Promotion: WWE
- Brand(s): Raw; SmackDown
- Date: December 14, 2024
- City: Uniondale, New York
- Venue: Nassau Veterans Memorial Coliseum
- Attendance: 15,021

WWE event chronology
← Previous; NXT Deadline	Next → Saturday Night's Main Event XXXVIII

Saturday Night's Main Event chronology
← Previous; XXXVI	Next → XXXVIII

Saturday Night's Main Event XXXVII was a 2024 professional wrestling television special produced by WWE, held for wrestlers from the promotion's main roster brands, Raw and SmackDown. It was the 37th edition of the periodic Saturday Night's Main Event series and was simulcast on NBC and Peacock in the United States and aired on YouTube internationally. The event took place on December 14, 2024, at the Nassau Veterans Memorial Coliseum in Uniondale, New York. The was the first Saturday Night's Main Event since July 2008 and featured the crowning of the inaugural WWE Women's United States Champion.

== Production ==
=== Background ===
Saturday Night's Main Event is a series of American professional wrestling television specials produced by WWE via NBC. The series was originally broadcast from 1985 to 1992, with the 1992 events produced by Fox, and were briefly held again from 2006 to 2008 by NBC. After Saturday Night's Main Event XXXVI in July 2008, WWE quietly discontinued the program with it being replaced with hour-long WrestleMania highlights specials begininng with WrestleMania 25.

After 16 years in September 2024, as part of NBC's acquisition of rights to air Friday Night SmackDown on the USA Network in the United States, Saturday Night's Main Event was reinstated to be simulcast on USA and NBC's streaming service Peacock in the United States, with WWE's YouTube channel streaming the program internationally. The 37th Saturday Night's Main Event, known as Saturday Night's Main Event XXXVII, was scheduled for December 14, 2024, at the Nassau Veterans Memorial Coliseum in Uniondale, New York and featured wrestlers from the Raw and SmackDown brands. On December 6, it was announced that WWE Hall of Famer and former Governor of Minnesota Jesse "The Body" Ventura would provide commentary at the event.

=== Storylines ===
The event included five matches that resulted from scripted storylines. Results were predetermined by WWE's writers on the Raw and SmackDown brands, while storylines were produced on WWE's weekly television shows, Monday Night Raw and Friday Night SmackDown.

In November 2024, WWE announced a tournament for the inaugural WWE Women's United States Championship for SmackDown, with the final to take place at Saturday Night's Main Event XXXVII.

== Results ==
No.	Results	Stipulations	Times
1^{D}	Motor City Machine Guns (Alex Shelley and Chris Sabin) defeated A-Town Down Under (Austin Theory and Grayson Waller) by pinfall	Tag team match	5:05
2	Drew McIntyre defeated Sami Zayn by pinfall	Singles match	10:06
3	Liv Morgan (c) defeated Iyo Sky by pinfall	Singles match for the Women's World Championship	9:05
4	Gunther (c) defeated Finn Bálor and Damian Priest by pinfall	Triple threat match for the World Heavyweight Championship	11:05
5	Chelsea Green (with Piper Niven) defeated Michin by pinfall	Singles match for the inaugural WWE Women's United States Championship	8:05
6	Cody Rhodes (c) defeated Kevin Owens by pinfall	Singles match for the Undisputed WWE Championship	12:02
(c) / – the champion(s) heading into the match; D / – this was a dark match

=== WWE Women's United States Championship Tournament ===
First round SmackDown; November 15 – December 6, 2024
Candice LeRae B-Fab	— 10:02
Bayley	Pinfall
Bianca Belair Blair Davenport	— 10:04
Chelsea Green	Pinfall
Lash Legend (Note: Jade Cargill was originally slated to participate, but was kayfabe attacked backstage by an unknown assailant (later revealed to be Naomi) during the November 22 episode of SmackDown and was pulled from the tournament. She was replaced by NXT's Lash Legend.) Piper Niven	— 10:34
Michin	Pinfall
Naomi Elektra Lopez	— 7:32
Tiffany Stratton	Pinfall

Semifinals; SmackDown; December 13, 2024
Bayley	12:12
Chelsea Green	Pinfall
Michin	Pinfall
Tiffany Stratton	8:23

Final; Saturday Night's Main Event; December 14, 2024
Chelsea Green	Pinfall
Michin	8:05
