= Lash Legend =

American professional wrestler (born 1997)

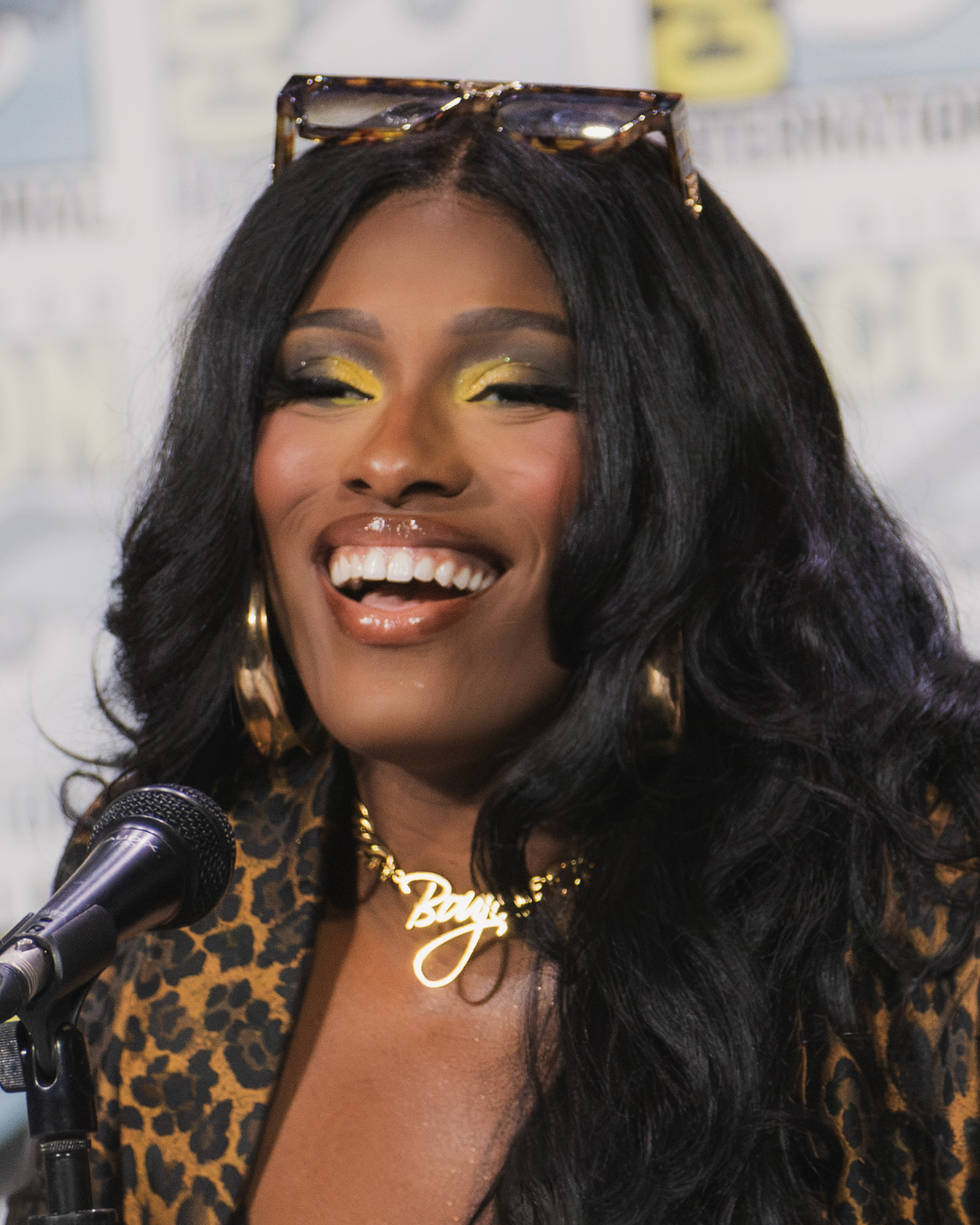
- Legend in 2026

Personal information
- Born: Anriel Howard; May 6, 1997 (age 29) Atlanta, Georgia, U.S.
- Spouse: Trick Williams (m. 2026)

Professional wrestling career
- Ring name: Lash Legend
- Billed height: 6 ft 0 in (183 cm)
- Billed from: Atlanta, Georgia
- Trained by: WWE Performance Center
- Debut: December 7, 2021
- Basketball career

Career information
- High school: Westlake (Atlanta, Georgia)
- College: Texas A&M (2015–2018); Mississippi State (2018–2019)
- WNBA draft: 2019: 2nd round, 24th overall pick
- Drafted by: Seattle Storm
- Playing career: 2019–2019
- Position: Guard
- Number: 5

Career history
- 2019: Seattle Storm

Career highlights
- First-team All-SEC (2019); AP Honorable Mention All-American (2019); SEC All-Freshman Team (2016)
- Stats at Basketball Reference

Anriel Howard (born May 6, 1997) is an American professional wrestler. As of December 2020, she is signed to WWE, where she performs on the SmackDown brand under the ring name Lash Legend. She is a former one-time WWE Women's Tag Team Champion.

Howard is a former college and professional basketball player who played for the Seattle Storm of the Women's National Basketball Association (WNBA).

== Basketball career ==
=== College ===
Howard came out of high school as the 100th rated recruit of the 2015 Class per ESPN's HoopGurlz rankings. She was also rated the 15th best forward at her position. Howard committed to play for Texas A&M. She played for them for three seasons before she transferred to Mississippi State for her senior season.

During her time at Texas A&M, Howard was the first player in Texas A&M history to have over 1,000 career rebounds with the school, getting 1,002 rebounds. She also set an NCAA Tournament record with 27 rebounds in a 2016 NCAA tournament game. She was named to the Southeastern Conference (SEC) All-Freshman team during her first year with the Aggies.

Howard announced she was going to transfer following her junior season, and ultimately chose to go to Mississippi State. Howard stated, "As soon as I landed I felt like it was the place...In high school when I was recruited, I just felt like Texas A&M was the place for me on my visit. Usually when I go on a visit there's something that I question, but I just never got that feeling and that was the first time ever."

She was named to the 2019 First Team All-SEC by both the Associated Press (AP) and Coaches, 2019 SEC All-Tournament Team, and to the 2019 AP All-American Honorable Mention team during her one season with the Bulldogs.

==== College career statistics ====
Year	Team	GP	GS	MPG	FG%	3P%	FT%	RPG	APG	SPG	BPG	TO	PPG
2015–16	Texas A&M	32	17	16.9	.465	0.0	.558	6.5	0.4	0.7	0.3	1.1	4.6
2016–17	Texas A&M	34	34	31.1	.415	**.500**	.660	10.4	0.9	**1.5**	0.3	2.0	10.2
2017–18	Texas A&M	36	36	**33.6**	.441	.308	**.752**	**12.2**	**1.9**	1.0	0.4	2.1	12.1
2018–19	Mississippi State	36	36	29.1	**.512**	.337	.725	8.4	1.5	1.1	**0.5**	2.1	**16.4**
Career		138	123	27.9	.462	.331	.701	9.4	1.2	1.1	0.4	1.8	11.0
Statistics retrieved from Sports-Reference.

=== WNBA ===
In the 2019 WNBA draft, Howard was taken 24th overall by the Seattle Storm. After debuting against the Minnesota Lynx on May 29, Howard played a total of three games with the Storm. She was waived from the team early in the season.

==== WNBA career statistics ====
Legend
GP	Games played	GS	Games started	MPG	Minutes per game	RPG	Rebounds per game
APG	Assists per game	SPG	Steals per game	BPG	Blocks per game	PPG	Points per game
TO	Turnovers per game	FG%	Field-goal percentage	3P%	3-point field-goal percentage	FT%	Free-throw percentage
**Bold**	Career best	°	League leader

==== Regular season ====
Year	Team	GP	GS	MPG	FG%	3P%	FT%	RPG	APG	SPG	BPG	TO	PPG
2019	Seattle	3	0	6.7	.400	.500	.000	1.0	0.0	0.3	0.0	0.7	1.7
Career		3	0	6.7	.400	.500	.000	1.0	0.0	0.3	0.0	0.7	1.7

== Professional wrestling career ==
=== WWE ===
==== Debut and early beginnings (2020–2023) ====
Howard signed with WWE on December 2, 2020. She first appeared on the NXT 2.0 premiere in a backstage segment congratulating Bron Breakker, on his victory against LA Knight, and a week later NXT, Howard made her official debut during a backstage segment with Franky Monet, presenting herself as Lash Legend. On the September 28 episode of NXT, Legend began being regularly featured as host of a pre-taped talk show segment, Lashing Out with Lash Legend. On the December 10 episode of 205 Live, Howard made her in-ring debut, defeating Amari Miller.

In February 2022, Legend and Miller confirmed they would team up to compete at the Women's Dusty Rhodes Tag Team Classic; however, the duo was lost in the first round to Io Shirai and Kay Lee Ray. On March 8, at NXT: Roadblock, Legend interviewed Nikkita Lyons during Lashing Out with Lash Legend, resulting in the two having a heated argument. The two rival wrestlers faced each other on the April 5 and 26 episodes of NXT, where Legend lost to Lyons both times. At Spring Breakin', Legend and Natalya lost to Cora Jade and Lyons in a tag team match. Shortly after, Legend entered the NXT Women's Breakout Tournament; she lost to Roxanne Perez in the semifinals. Over the next few months, Legend would lose to the likes of Fallon Henley, Wendy Choo, Shotzi and Lyra Valkyria while also failing to win title opportunities in battle royals. Since of August 2022, through live events, Legend found an ally in Jakara Jackson. They had their first televised appearance as a team on the November 11 episode of NXT Level Up, where they lost to Diamond Mine's Ivy Nile and Tatum Paxley.

==== The Meta-Four (2023–2025) ====
On May 28, 2023, at NXT Battleground, during a British Rounds Rules match for the NXT Heritage Cup between the champion Noam Dar and Dragon Lee, Legend alongside Jackson interfered in favor of Dar, helping him to retain the Heritage Cup in the process. Dar would introduce the group of himself, Legend, Jackson and Oro Mensah as The Meta-Four. On the February 20, 2024, episode of NXT, Legend faced Lyra Valkyria for the NXT Women's Championship in an open challenge. However, Legend failed to defeat Valkyria for the title. At NXT Battleground, she participated in a six-women ladder match to crown the first NXT Women's North American Championship, but failed to win the championship. At Week 1 of NXT: The Great American Bash on July 30, Jackson and Legend failed to defeat The Unholy Union (Alba Fyre and Isla Dawn) for the WWE Women's Tag Team Championship; prior to their match, Legend and the rest of The Meta-Four turned face when stablemate Oro Mensah began feuding with Ethan Page, who attacked him and Noam Dar backstage back in May.

On the October 11 episode of SmackDown, Legend and Jackson made their main roster debut where they unsuccessfully challenged WWE Women's Tag Team Champions Bianca Belair and Jade Cargill for the title. On the October 18 episode of SmackDown, Legend defeated Piper Niven to win her debut singles match on the main roster. On the October 22 episode of NXT, Legend and Jackson fought Sky and Sane to a no contest after interference from Niven and Chelsea Green. On the following episode of SmackDown, the three brands' general managers announced that Belair and Cargill will defend their titles against Legend and Jackson, Sky and Sane, and Green and Niven in a fatal four-way tag team match at Crown Jewel where Belair and Cargill retained their titles. On the November 29 tape delay episode of SmackDown, Legend replaced Cargill in the preliminary round of the tournament to crown the inaugural Women's United States Championship, where she lost to Michin in a triple threat match also involving Niven. At Royal Rumble on February 1, 2025, Legend participated in her first Royal Rumble match as entrant #9, lasting 17 minutes before being eliminated by Chelsea Green, and scoring no eliminations. On the April 29 episode of NXT, Meta-Four would meet in a backstage segment in which they announced their mutual agreement to disband, citing personal singles ventures.

==== The Irresistible Forces (2025–present) ====
At Evolution on July 13, 2025, Legend entered the 20-woman battle royal and was the runner up of the match. On the November 7, 2025 episode of SmackDown, Legend made her return to the blue brand as a heel by attacking Alexa Bliss, helping Nia Jax to win against Charlotte Flair, and in the process, aligning herself with Jax as a tag team. At Survivor Series: WarGames, Legend and Jax teamed with Becky Lynch and The Kabuki Warriors (Asuka and Kairi Sane) to face AJ Lee, Alexa Bliss, Charlotte Flair, and Rhiyo (Rhea Ripley and Iyo Sky) in the WarGames match in a losing effort. At the Royal Rumble event on January 31, 2026, Legend entered the namesake match as entrant #15 where she scored five eliminations before being eliminated by Ripley. On the February 27 episode of SmackDown, Legend and Jax, now known as The Irresistible Forces, defeated Rhiyo to win the WWE Women's Tag Team Championship, marking the first championship in her career. At WrestleMania 42 Night 1 on April 18, Legend and Jax lost the titles to Brie Bella and the returning Paige, who filled in for an injured Nikki Bella, ending their reign at 50 days. At Saturday Night’s Main Event XLIV on May 23, Legend and Jax failed to regain the titles. At Night 2 of SummerSlam on August 2, Legend failed to capture the Interim WWE Women's Championship in a ladder match as it was won by Chelsea Green. On the September 25 episode of SmackDown, Legend defeated Charlotte Flair and Giulia to qualify for the Women's Money in the Bank ladder match. At the event on October 10, Legend failed to win the match as it was won by Tiffany Stratton.

=== Total Nonstop Action Wrestling (2025) ===
At Sacrifice on March 14, 2025, Jakara Jackson and Lash Legend made their Total Nonstop Action Wrestling (TNA) debut where they appeared after the TNA Knockouts World Tag Team Championship match to confront the new champions Ash by Elegance and Heather by Elegance. On the April 3 episode of Impact!, Jackson and Legend made their TNA in-ring debut, defeating Spitfire (Dani Luna and Jody Threat). On April 27 at Rebellion, Jackson and Legend competed in a four-way tag team match for the TNA Knockouts World Tag Team Championship, but failed to win.

== Other media ==
On September 30, 2024, Howard, as Lash Legend, announced her new YouTube series, Dash of Lash, a weekly cooking show premiering on October 17 which will also feature NXT wrestlers as guests.

Howard, as Lash Legend, made her video game debut as a playable character in WWE 2K25. She later appeared in WWE 2K26.

== Personal life ==
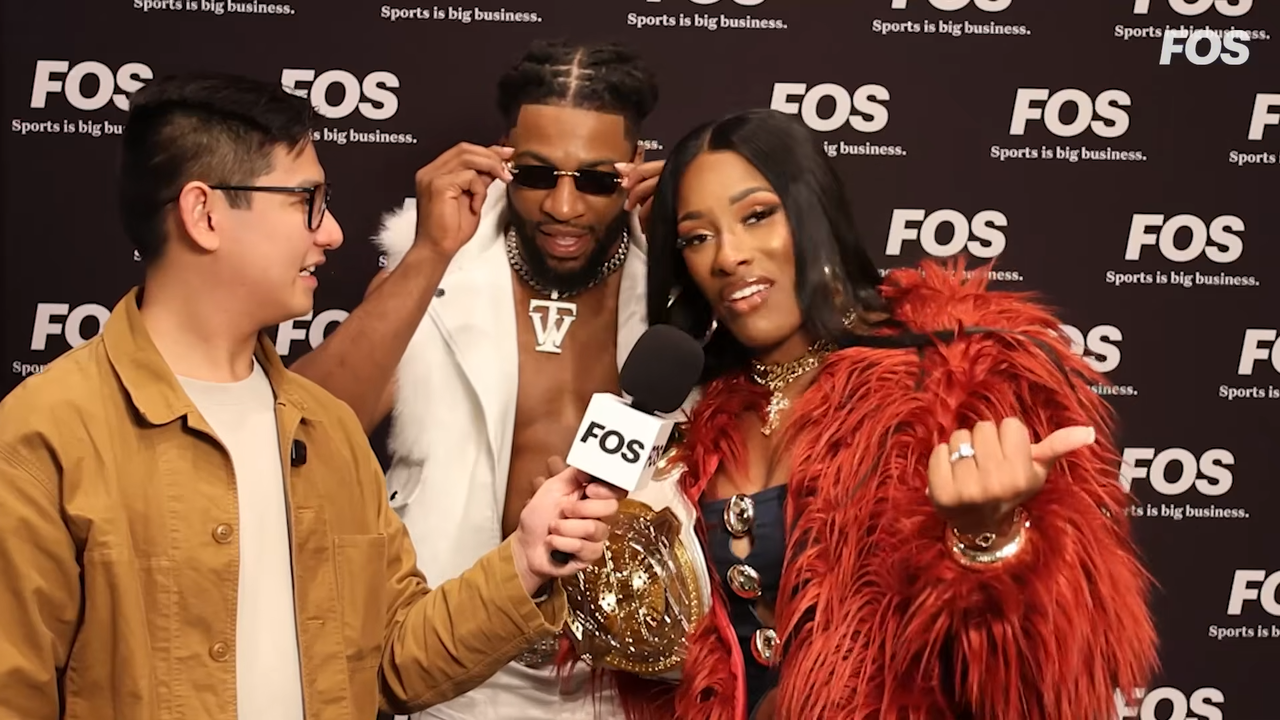
Lash Legend and her husband Trick Williams getting interviewed at FOS 2026.

On June 20, 2026, Howard married fellow professional wrestler Matrick Belton, better known under the ring name Trick Williams, in Port Antonio, Jamaica.

== Championships and accomplishments ==
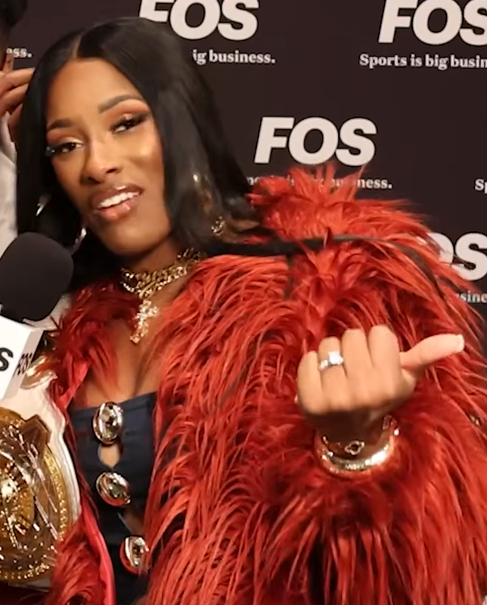
Lash Legend is a 1-time WWE Women's Tag Team Champion.

- Pro Wrestling Illustrated
  - Ranked No. 73 of the top 250 female wrestlers in the PWI Women's 250 in 2025
- WWE
  - WWE Women's Tag Team Championship (1 time) – with Nia Jax
