= WWE Women's United States Championship =

Professional wrestling championship

- The WWE Women's United States Championship belt with default side plates (2026–present)

Details
- Promotion: WWE
- Brand: SmackDown
- Date established: December 14, 2024
- Current champion: Jacy Jayne
- Date won: August 14, 2026
Statistics
- First champion: Chelsea Green
- Most reigns: 2 reigns: Chelsea Green; Giulia
- Longest reign: Giulia (1st reign, 133 days)
- Shortest reign: Chelsea Green (2nd reign, 56 days)
- Oldest champion: Chelsea Green (34 years, 217 days)
- Youngest champion: Tiffany Stratton (26 years, 358 days)
- Heaviest champion: Tiffany Stratton (143 lb (65 kg))
- Lightest champion: Zelina Vega (106 lb (48 kg))

The Women's United States Championship is a women's professional wrestling championship created and promoted by the American promotion WWE, defended on the SmackDown brand division. It is one of two secondary women's championships on WWE's main roster, along with the WWE Women's Intercontinental Championship on Raw. Established in November 2024, the inaugural champion was Chelsea Green. The current champion is Jacy Jayne, who is in her first reign. She won the title by defeating Tiffany Stratton on the August 14, 2026, episode of SmackDown.

== History ==
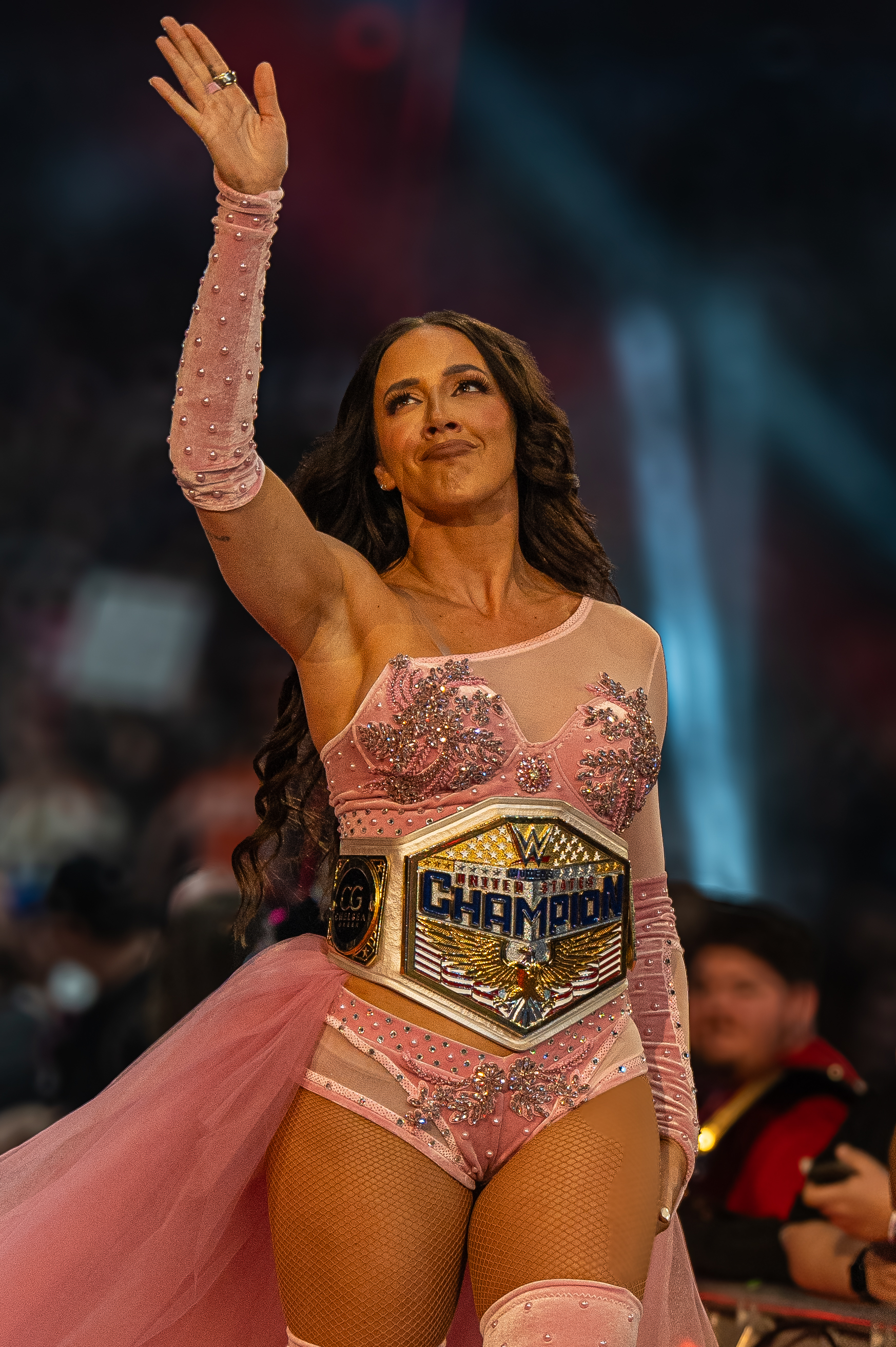
Inaugural and record-tying two-time champion Chelsea Green

The American professional wrestling promotion WWE was founded in April 1963, but it never had a secondary women's championship until the NXT Women's North American Championship was introduced for the developmental brand NXT in April 2024. Later that year during the November 8, 2024, episode of SmackDown, the brand's general manager Nick Aldis unveiled the WWE Women's United States Championship as a secondary championship for the main roster women's division on the SmackDown brand, countering the men's WWE United States Championship. The WWE Women's Intercontinental Championship was subsequently introduced for Raw on November 25.

Prior to the November 15 episode of SmackDown, Aldis announced that tournament matches to determine the inaugural Women's United States Champion would begin on that night's episode. WWE Chief Content Officer Paul "Triple H" Levesque subsequently revealed the tournament bracket, featuring 12 women from the SmackDown roster in four triple threat matches for the first round, with the winners of each advancing to the semifinals in singles matches with those winners then facing off in the tournament final at Saturday Night's Main Event XXXVII on December 14, 2024. Tournament participants announced were Bayley, B-Fab, Candice LeRae, Bianca Belair, Chelsea Green, Blair Davenport, Michin, Piper Niven, Jade Cargill, Naomi, Tiffany Stratton, and Elektra Lopez. Cargill, however, was pulled from the tournament due to a backstage assault and was replaced by NXT's Lash Legend. In the tournament final at Saturday Night's Main Event on December 14, Green defeated Michin to become the inaugural champion.

== Inaugural tournament ==
First round SmackDown; November 15 – December 6, 2024
Candice LeRae B-Fab	— 10:02
Bayley	Pinfall
Bianca Belair Blair Davenport	— 10:04
Chelsea Green	Pinfall
Lash Legend (Note: Jade Cargill was originally slated to participate, but was kayfabe attacked backstage by an unknown assailant (later revealed to be Naomi) during the November 22 episode of SmackDown and was pulled from the tournament. She was replaced by NXT's Lash Legend.) Piper Niven	— 10:34
Michin	Pinfall
Naomi Elektra Lopez	— 7:32
Tiffany Stratton	Pinfall

Semifinals; SmackDown; December 13, 2024
Bayley	12:12
Chelsea Green	Pinfall
Michin	Pinfall
Tiffany Stratton	8:23

Final; Saturday Night's Main Event; December 14, 2024
Chelsea Green	Pinfall
Michin	8:05

== Belt design ==
The belt design is identical to the men's version, but like all women's championships in WWE, it is smaller and on a white strap and it has small blue text that reads "Women's" placed above the words "United States"; the eight stars that divides "United States" and "Champion" were placed above and surrounds the word "Women's". Like all of WWE's other championship belts, the two side plates feature a removable center section which can be customized with the champion's logos; the default side plates feature a WWE logo over a silver globe. On the August 21, 2026, episode of SmackDown, reigning champion Jacy Jayne introduced an updated version of the belt where the main plate received a minor update with a blue background behind the stars at the top of the plate, which was first introduced with Trick Williams's custom version of the men's title in July 2026.

== Reigns ==
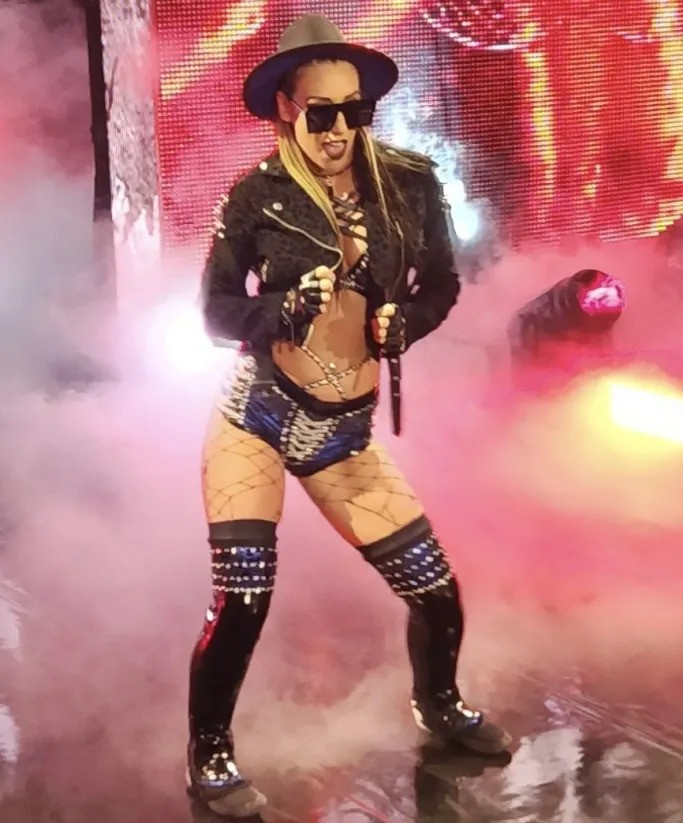
Current champion Jacy Jayne

As of November 18, 2026, there have been seven reigns between five different champions. The inaugural champion was Chelsea Green, who is tied with Giulia for the most reigns at two. Giulia's first reign is the longest at 133 days, while Green's second reign is the shortest at 56 days. Green is the oldest champion at 34 years, 217 days old, while Tiffany Stratton is the youngest at 26.

Jacy Jayne is the current champion in her first reign. She won the title by defeating Tiffany Stratton on the August 14, 2026, episode of SmackDown in Boston, Massachusetts.

Key
No.	Overall reign number
Reign	Reign number for the specific champion
Days	Number of days held
Days recog.	Number of days held recognized by the promotion
+	Current reign is changing daily

No.	Champion	Championship change			Reign statistics			Notes	Ref.
No.	Champion	Date	Event	Location	Reign	Days	Days recog.	Notes	Ref.
WWE: SmackDown
1	Chelsea Green	December 14, 2024	Saturday Night's Main Event XXXVII	Uniondale, NY	1	132	131	Defeated Michin in a tournament final to become the inaugural champion.	
2	Zelina Vega	April 25, 2025	SmackDown	Fort Worth, TX	1	63	62		
3	Giulia	June 27, 2025	SmackDown	Riyadh, Saudi Arabia	1	133	133		
4	Chelsea Green	November 7, 2025	SmackDown	Greenville, SC	2	56	56		
5	Giulia	January 2, 2026	SmackDown	Buffalo, NY	2	112	111		
6	Tiffany Stratton	April 24, 2026	SmackDown	Fort Worth, TX	1	112	112		
7	Jacy Jayne	August 14, 2026	SmackDown	Boston, MA	1	96+	96+		

== Combined reigns ==
As of November 18, 2026.

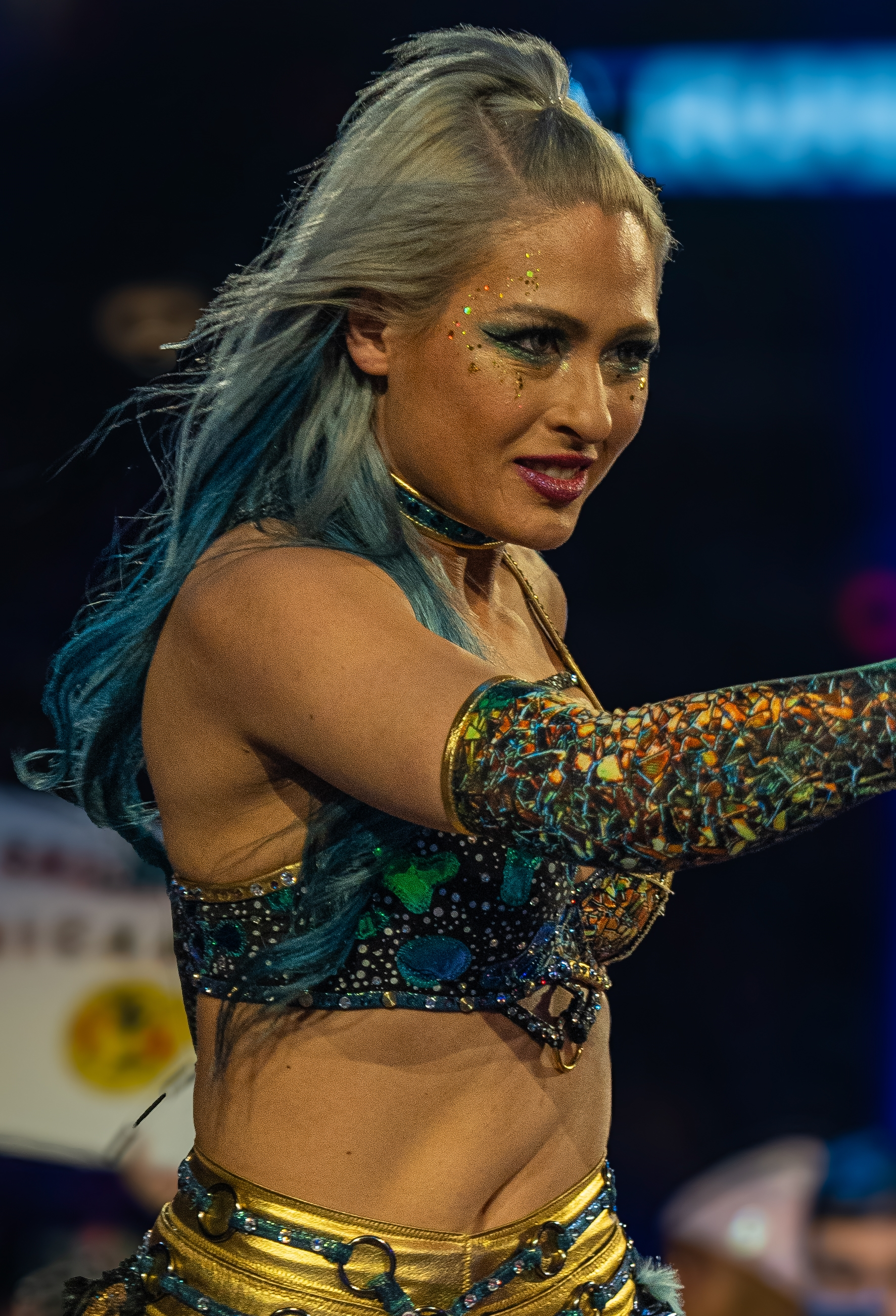
Record-tying two-time and longest-reigning champion Giulia

†	Indicates the current champion

Rank	Wrestler	No. of reigns	Combined days	Combined days rec. by WWE
1	Giulia	2	245	244
2	Chelsea Green	2	188	187
3	Tiffany Stratton	1	112	
4	Jacy Jayne †	1	96+	
5	Zelina Vega	1	63	62

== See also ==
- Women's championships in WWE
