= Tiffany Stratton =

American professional wrestler (born 1999)

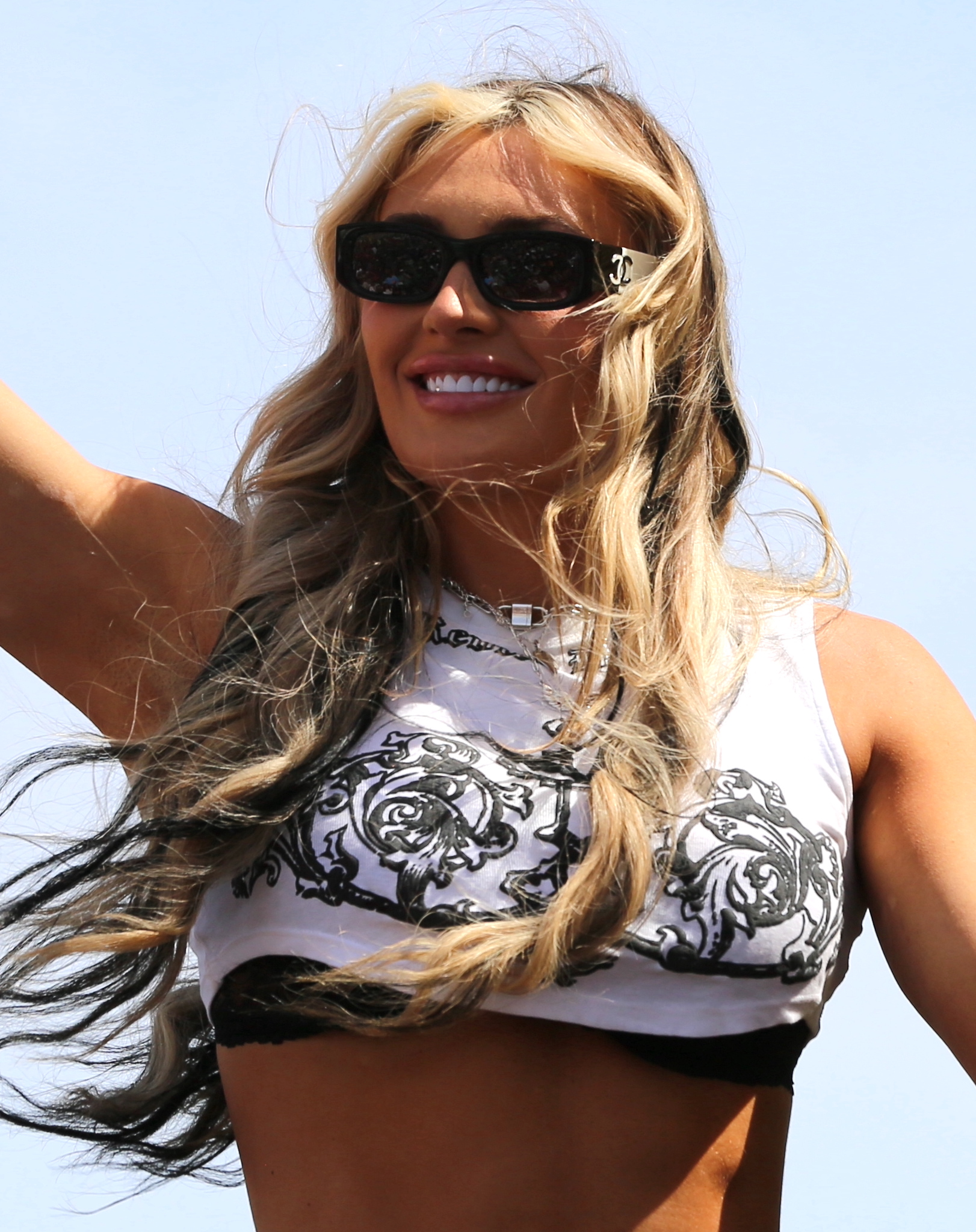
- Stratton in 2026

Personal information
- Born: Jessica Lynn Woynilko; May 1, 1999 (age 27) Prior Lake, Minnesota, U.S.
- Education: St. Catherine University

Professional wrestling career
- Ring name: Tiffany Stratton
- Billed height: 5 ft 7 in (1.70 m)
- Billed weight: 143 lb (65 kg)
- Billed from: Minneapolis, Minnesota
- Trained by: Ken Anderson; Greg Gagne; WWE Performance Center
- Debut: November 16, 2021

Jessica Lynn Woynilko (born May 1, 1999) is an American professional wrestler and former gymnast. She is signed to WWE, where she performs on the SmackDown brand under the ring name Tiffany Stratton and is the current WWE Women's Champion in her second reign.

After winning weightlifting and bodybuilding championships, Woynilko's parents wanted her to become a professional wrestler and had her trained by Greg Gagne. She signed with WWE in August 2021 and debuted in November, before joining the developmental brand, NXT, where she won the NXT Women's Championship once. She was then promoted to the main roster on SmackDown in February 2024, where she became a two-time WWE Women's Champion, one-time WWE Women's United States Champion and also the winner of the 2024 & 2026 Women's Money in the Bank.

== Early years ==
Jessica Woynilko was born on May 1, 1999, in Prior Lake, Minnesota. She graduated from St. Catherine University in Saint Paul and practiced trampoline gymnastics for several years. Her gymnastics career ended in 2017, when she suffered an undiagnosed stress fracture in her foot. Woynilko's parents wanted her to pursue a career in professional wrestling in 2019, so her mother contacted former American Wrestling Association (AWA) wrestler Greg Gagne to train Woynilko prior to joining WWE. She cites watching Charlotte Flair on SmackDown as her inspiration for becoming a professional wrestler.

== Professional wrestling career ==
=== WWE (2021–present) ===
==== NXT (2021–2024) ====
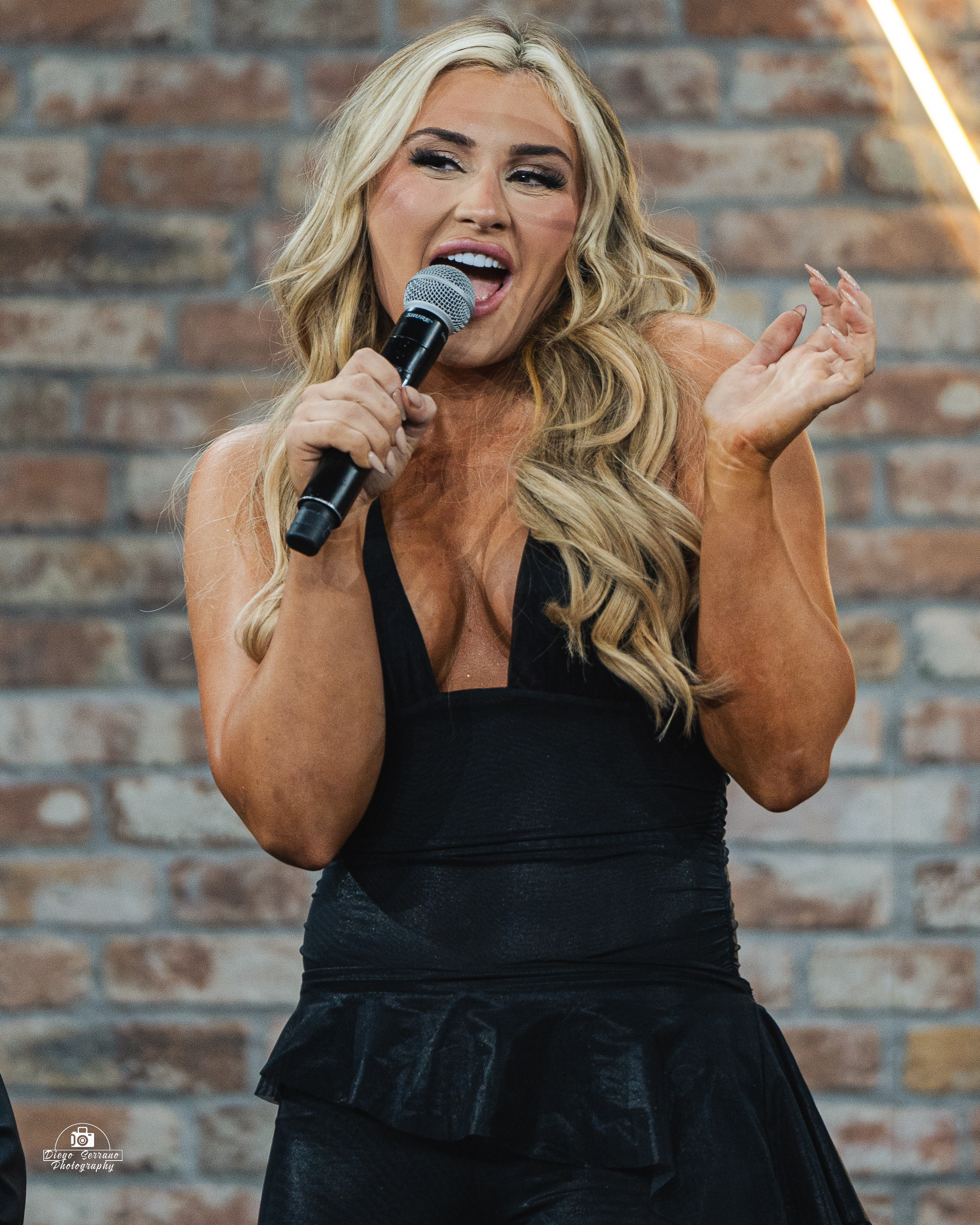
Stratton in 2024

On August 30, 2021, Woynilko was the only woman announced in a new group of recruits who would be training at the WWE Performance Center. During a taping of the November 16 episode of 205 Live, she made her professional wrestling debut under the ring name Tiffany Stratton, defeating Amari Miller. On December 28, she debuted as a heel on WWE's developmental brand, NXT, with a rich, spoiled 'daddy's girl' gimmick, defeating Fallon Henley.

In March 2022, Stratton began her first feud with Sarray, whom she attacked for rejecting her offer to replace her necklace with one Stratton would give to her. Sarray responded by costing Stratton her matches over the following weeks, resulting in Stratton defeating Sarray on the April 19 episode of NXT. On May 24, she replaced the injured Nikkita Lyons in the NXT Women's Breakout Tournament, but eventually lost to Roxanne Perez in the finals. Stratton next feuded with Wendy Choo, defeating her at NXT: The Great American Bash on July 5, before losing to Choo in a lights out match on the August 23 episode of NXT. After taking time off due to an injury, Stratton returned in January 2023 at NXT: New Year's Evil. At NXT Stand & Deliver on April 1, she competed in a ladder match for the NXT Women's Championship, which was won by Indi Hartwell. She failed to win the title from Hartwell in a triple threat match also involving Perez on April 25 at Spring Breakin'.

Stratton took part in an eight-woman single-elimination tournament, in which she defeated Gigi Dolin in the quarterfinals, Perez in the semifinals, and Lyra Valkyria in the finals at NXT Battleground on May 28 to win the NXT Women's Championship, her first championship in her career. On June 27, at NXT: Gold Rush, Stratton made her first successful title defense against Chase University's Thea Hail. During the match, Hail submitted Stratton, which the referee did not see after a distraction by Drew Gulak. This led to a submission match for the title at NXT The Great American Bash on July 30, where Stratton defeated Hail, after Andre Chase threw in the towel when Stratton locked Hail in a submission. On the September 12 episode of NXT, Stratton lost the title to Becky Lynch, ending her reign at 107 days. She failed to regain the title from Lynch in an Extreme Rules match at NXT No Mercy on September 30. On December 9, she competed in the women's Iron Survivor Challenge at NXT Deadline, which was won by Blair Davenport.

At NXT: New Year's Evil on January 2, 2024, Stratton lost to Fallon Henley in a "ranch hand or servant for a day" match, thus she had to work at Henley's ranch for a day the following week, in what marked her final NXT appearance. On January 27, at the Royal Rumble pay-per-view, Stratton entered the women's Royal Rumble match at number 29, eliminating Perez, before being eliminated by the eventual winner Bayley.

==== Main roster debut and WWE Women's Champion (2024–2025) ====
On February 2, Stratton was officially assigned to the SmackDown brand. Stratton defeated Zelina Vega on the February 16 episode of SmackDown to qualify for the women's Elimination Chamber match at the titular event on February 24, where she eliminated Naomi, before being eliminated by Liv Morgan. At Backlash France on May 4, she failed to win the WWE Women’s Championship from Bayley in a triple threat match, also involving Naomi. Stratton then formed an alliance with Queen of the Ring winner and WWE Women’s Champion Nia Jax. On July 6, Stratton won the women’s Money in the Bank ladder match at the namesake event. At Survivor Series WarGames on November 30, Stratton participated in her first WarGames match alongside Jax, Morgan, Raquel Rodriguez and Candice LeRae, where they lost to Naomi, Bayley, Bianca Belair, Rhea Ripley and Iyo Sky.

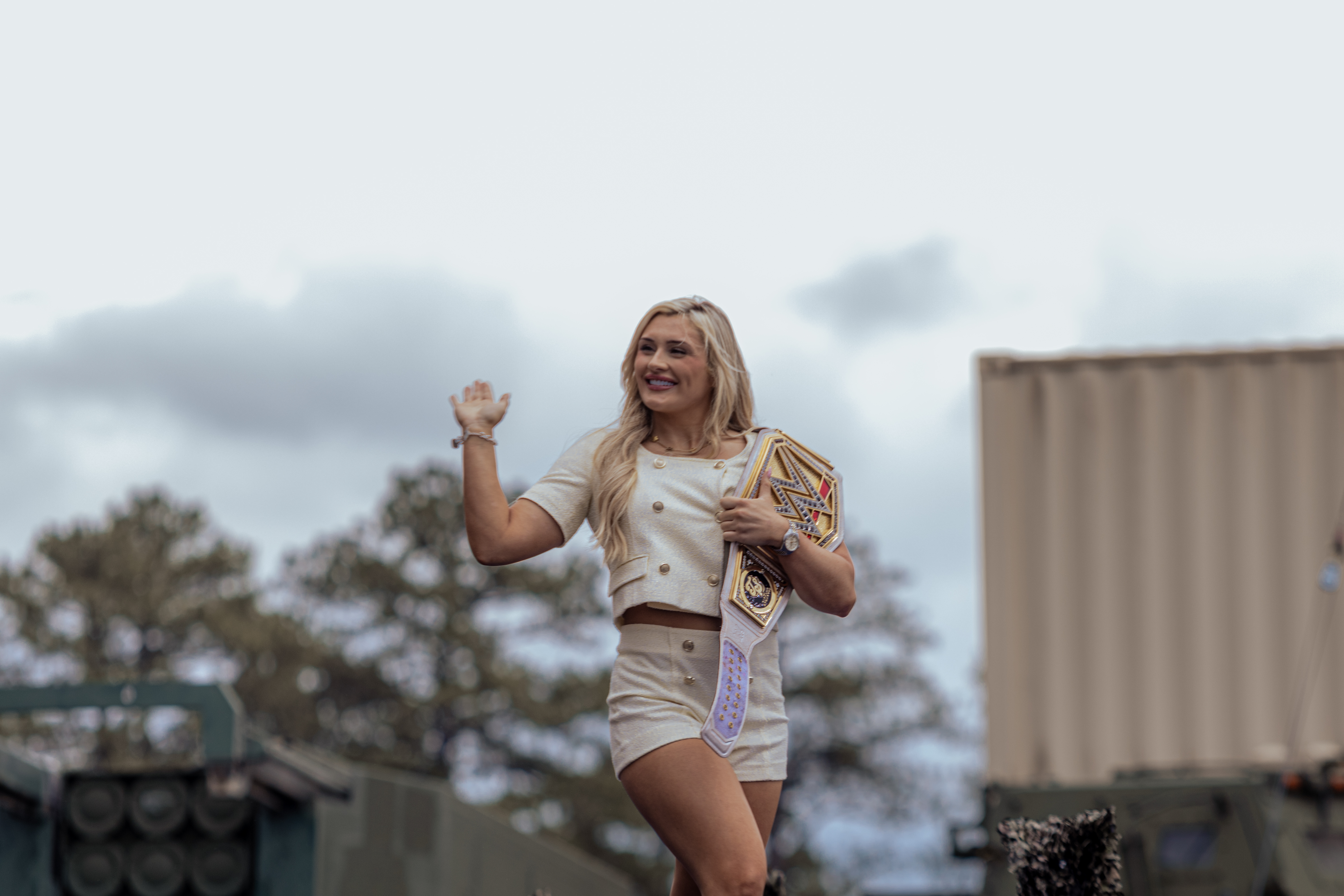
Stratton as WWE Women's Champion in June 2025

On the January 3, 2025 episode of SmackDown, after assisting Jax in her title defense against Naomi, Stratton turned on Jax and LeRae and cashed in her Money in the Bank contract on Jax to win the WWE Women's Championship. She made her first successful title defense against Bayley on January 17. On the February 14 episode of SmackDown, Stratton defeated Jax via disqualification to retain the title, after interference from LeRae. She was then attacked by Royal Rumble winner Charlotte Flair, who challenged her for the WWE Women's Championship at WrestleMania 41, fully turning Stratton face for the first time in her career. On Night 1 of WrestleMania on April 19, Stratton defeated Flair to retain the title. Stratton retained her title against Jax on the May 16 episode of SmackDown, and in a Last Woman Standing match on the June 27 episode to end their feud. After teaming with Trish Stratus at the Elimination Chamber event to defeat Nia Jax and Candice LeRae, Stratton successfully defended the title against Stratus on July 13 at Evolution. Stratton then successfully defended the title against Queen of the Ring winner Jade Cargill on Night 1 of SummerSlam on August 2. At Crown Jewel on October 11, Stratton faced Women's World Champion Stephanie Vaquer for the WWE Women's Crown Jewel Championship in a losing effort, suffering her first loss in 2025. At Saturday Night's Main Event on November 1, Stratton lost the title to Cargill, ending her reign at 302 days.

==== Continued championship reigns (2026–present) ====
After a two-month hiatus, Stratton returned at the Royal Rumble on January 31, 2026 as the final entrant in the namesake match. She finished in second place, being the last competitor eliminated by winner Liv Morgan. On the February 6, episode of SmackDown, Stratton defeated Chelsea Green and Lash Legend to qualify for the Elimination Chamber match at Elimination Chamber. At the event on February 28, Stratton failed to win the match as she was the last competitor eliminated by Rhea Ripley. On the April 24 episode of SmackDown, Stratton defeated Giulia to win the Women's United States Championship for the first time in her career. On the May 8th and May 22nd editions of SmackDown, she retained her title against Kiana James and Lash Legend. In early June, she started a feud with Jade Cargill, Michin and B-Fab, teaming up with Charlotte Flair (losing to Cargill and Michin), as well as Alexa Bliss and her new tag team partner Chelsea Green (losing to Cargill's trio). At Night of Champions on June 27, Stratton retained the title against Cargill after Flair cost Cargill the win. At Night 2 of SummerSlam on August 2, Stratton, in her home state of Minnesota, competed in a ladder match for the Interim WWE Women's Championship, which was won by Chelsea Green. On the August 7 episode of SmackDown, Stratton and Green challenged Fatal Influence (Fallon Henley and Lainey Reid) for the WWE Women's Tag Team Championship in a losing effort after interference from Jacy Jayne. The following week on SmackDown on August 14, Stratton lost the title to Jayne ending her reign at 112 days.

At Money in the Bank on October 10, Stratton won her second women's Money in the Bank ladder match. At Crown Jewel on November 7, Stratton turned heel and cashed in her Money in the Bank against Green after her match against Morgan and won the WWE Women's Championship for her second time.

== Professional wrestling style and persona ==
Woynilko's finishing maneuver, inspired by her trampoline gymnastics background, is a variation of the triple jump moonsault using the ropes, called the Prettiest Moonsault Ever. She previously used a springboard into a corkscrew as a finisher. Upon her wrestling debut, Stratton was given the gimmick of a stereotypical, rich 'daddy's girl'. She cites Paris Hilton and the character of Sharpay Evans from High School Musical as inspirations for the gimmick.

== Other media ==
=== Video games ===
Year	Title	Role	Notes
2023	WWE SuperCard	Tiffany Stratton	
2023	WWE 2K23	Tiffany Stratton	Pretty Sweet Pack DLC
2024	WWE 2K24	Tiffany Stratton	
2025	WWE 2K25	Tiffany Stratton	
2026	WWE 2K26	Tiffany Stratton	

== Championships and accomplishments ==
=== Gymnastics ===
Event	Date	Location	Place and Sport
2016 Winter Classic	February 20, 2016	Battle Creek, Michigan	2nd-DM (Open)
2016 Elite Challenge	May 7, 2016	Colorado Springs, Colorado	4th-TR (Open); 5th-DM
2016 USA Gymnastics Championships	June 12, 2016	Providence, Rhode Island	7th-TR (Open); 3rd-DM
2017 Winter Classic	February 25, 2017	Battle Creek, Michigan	7th-DM
2017 Elite Challenge	May 20, 2017	Colorado Springs, Colorado	7th-TR (Open)

=== Professional wrestling ===
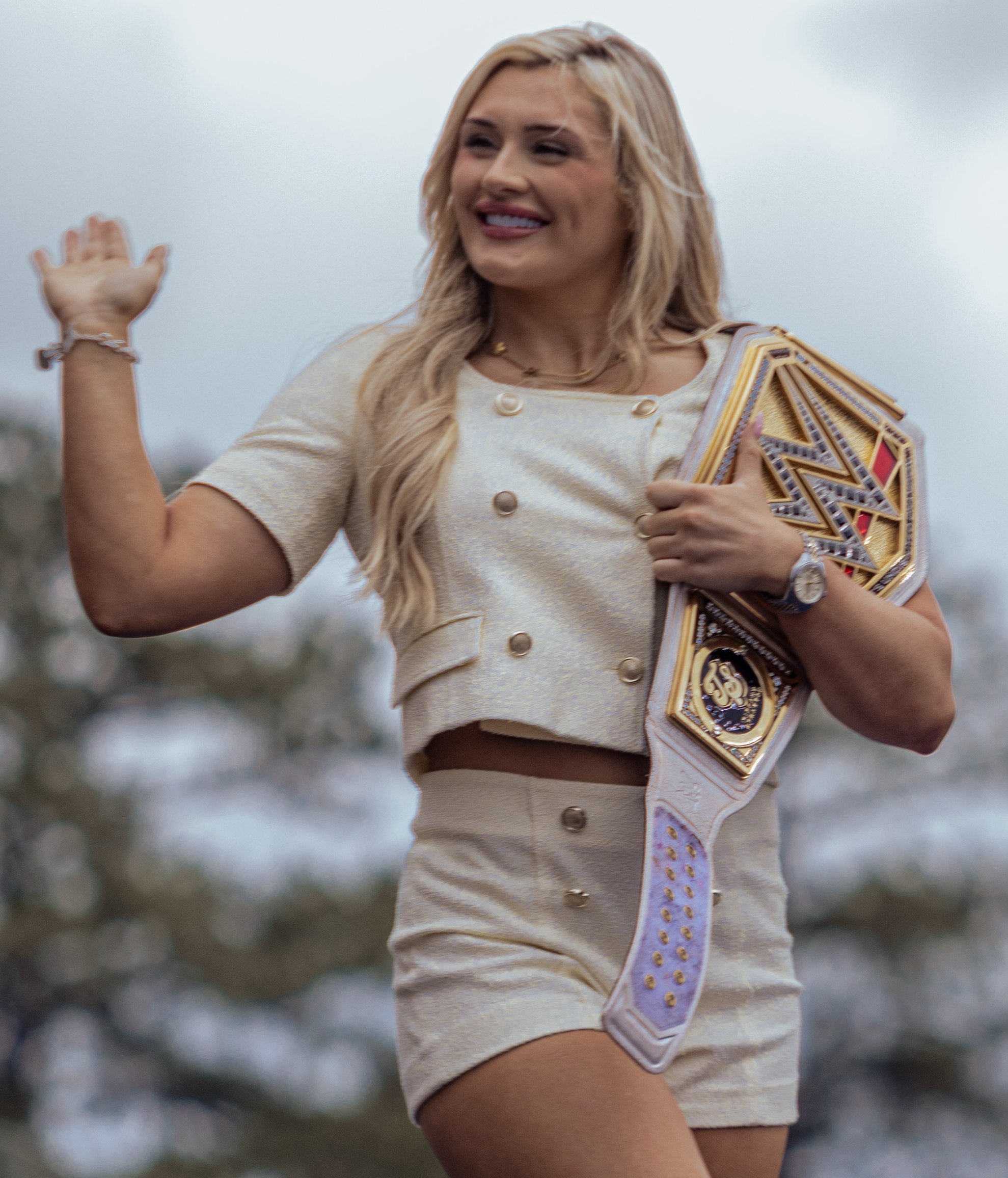
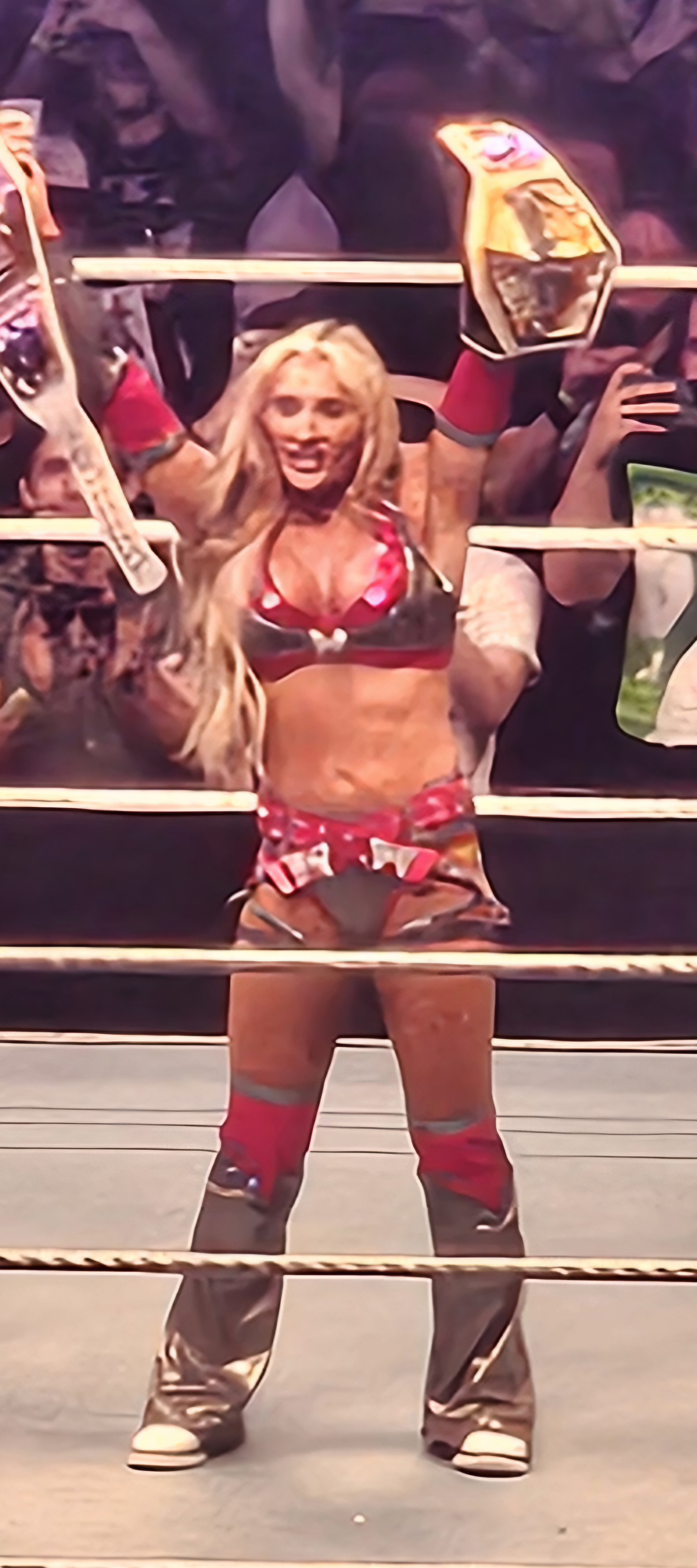
Stratton is the current and two-time WWE Women's Champion and a one-time WWE Women's United States Champion
- Pro Wrestling Illustrated
  - Ranked No. 25 of the top 250 female singles wrestlers in the PWI Women's 250 in 2023
  - Ranked No. 4 of the top 250 female singles wrestlers in the PWI Women's 250 in 2025
- Women's Wrestling Fan Awards
  - Breakout Star of the Year (2023)
- WWE
  - WWE Women's Championship (2 times, current)
  - WWE Women's United States Championship (1 time)
  - NXT Women's Championship (1 time)
  - Women's Money in the Bank (2024, 2026)
  - NXT Women's Championship Tournament (2023)
  - NXT Year-End Award (1 time)
    - Female Superstar of the Year (2023)
  - Slammy Award (1 time)
    - NXT Superstar of the Year (2024)
