= Jade Cargill =

American professional wrestler (born 1992)

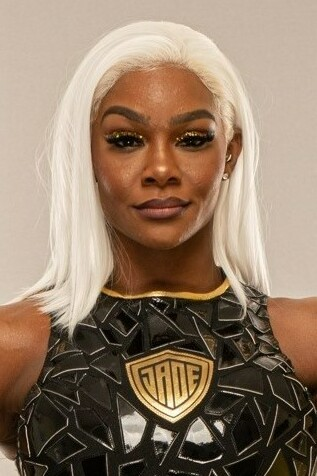
- Cargill in 2022

Personal information
- Born: June 3, 1992 (age 34) Gifford, Florida, U.S.
- Education: Jacksonville University
- Spouse: Brandon Phillips
- Children: 1
- Relative: Peter Cargill (cousin)

Professional wrestling career
- Ring name: Jade Cargill
- Billed height: 5 ft 10 in (178 cm)
- Billed weight: 160 lb (73 kg)
- Billed from: Vero Beach, Florida
- Trained by: AR Fox; Bryan Danielson; Dustin Rhodes; Mark Henry; Q. T. Marshall; Sonjay Dutt; William Regal; WWE Performance Center
- Debut: March 3, 2021

Jade Cargill (born June 3, 1992) is an American professional wrestler. She has been signed to WWE since September 2023, where she performs on the SmackDown brand. She is also known for her tenure in All Elite Wrestling (AEW) from 2020 to 2023.

Since completing her post-secondary education, Cargill then debuted as a professional wrestler in 2018 where she was trained by Mark Henry. In 2020, Cargill then signed to the upstart All Elite Wrestling (AEW) promotion, where she was the inaugural AEW TBS Champion, a reign that lasted for 508 days. Cargill then left AEW in 2023 and signed with the WWE, where she made her in-ring debut at the 2024 Royal Rumble. In WWE, she is a one-time WWE Women's Champion, a two-time WWE Women's Tag Team Champion, and won the Queen of the Ring tournament in 2025.

== Early life ==
Jade Cargill was born on June 3, 1992 in Gifford, Florida. She is of Jamaican descent and her father was a first generation immigrant from Jamaica. She began playing basketball at the age of six. She attended Sebastian River High School, Florida Air Academy, and Vero Beach High School, helping her teams to two basketball district championships. In 2009, Cargill played Amateur Athletic Union basketball for the Orlando Comets.

Cargill attended Jacksonville University, where she played basketball for the Jacksonville Dolphins as a forward/guard. In her sophomore year, she was named Atlantic Sun Player of the Week. In her senior year, she led the Jacksonville Dolphins in rebounds and steals, and was named to the Atlantic Sun Preseason First Team. While at Jacksonville University, Cargill joined the Omicron Delta chapter of the Alpha Kappa Alpha sorority. After graduating from Jacksonville University with a social science degree, Cargill spent time in France, where she played basketball and modelled. Cargill later attained a master's degree in child psychology and worked with foster children as a child psychologist until 2019.

== Professional wrestling career ==
=== Training (2018–2023) ===
Interested in becoming a professional wrestler, Cargill was introduced to WWE veteran Mark Henry by a mutual friend. Taking advice from Henry, who she described as her "mentor", in 2018 Cargill attended the Face 2 Face professional wrestling school in Morrow, Georgia owned by Heath Slater, Ron Simmons, and Teddy Long. In April 2019, Cargill attended a WWE tryout at the WWE Performance Center. Subsequently, Cargill began training at AR Fox's WWA4 Academy. She then trained at Nightmare Factory under Q. T. Marshall and Dustin Rhodes. Sonjay Dutt and Bryan Danielson started coaching her when they arrived in All Elite Wrestling (AEW) in 2021, at the request of AEW founder and owner Tony Khan. After signing with WWE in 2023, she received training from their Performance Center.

=== All Elite Wrestling (2020–2023) ===
Cargill made her professional wrestling debut with AEW on the November 11, 2020, episode of Dynamite, interrupting Cody Rhodes, and teasing the arrival of Shaquille O'Neal. The next day, Tony Khan announced that Cargill had signed a multi-year contract with AEW. She began feuding with Rhodes and his wife Brandi, leading to a tag team match pitting her and O'Neal against Rhodes and Red Velvet on the March 3, 2021, episode of Dynamite; the match was won by Cargill and O'Neal. On the March 17 episode of Dynamite, Cargill wrestled her first singles match, defeating Dani Jordyn. Despite Matt Hardy offering his managerial services to Cargill, he was shunned in favor of Mark Sterling, which was announced on the May 28 episode of Dynamite.

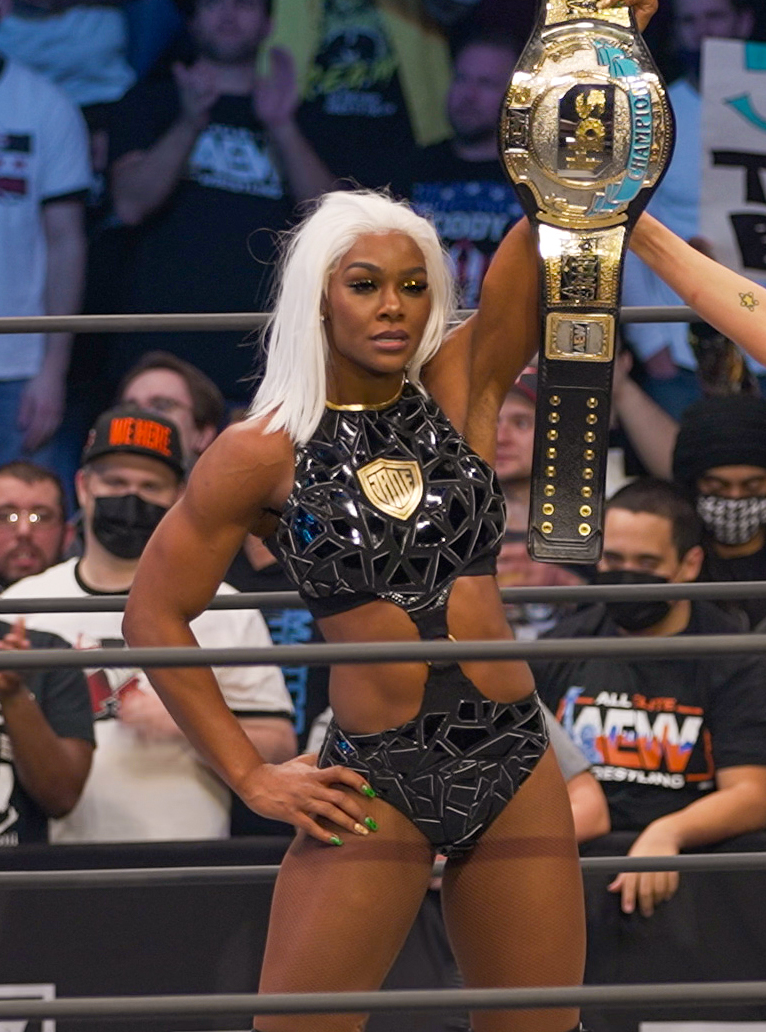
Cargill as AEW TBS Champion; she held the championship for 508 days.

In October 2021, it was announced that Cargill would participate in a tournament to determine the inaugural AEW TBS Champion, and would be one of four women to receive a first round bye. Cargill went on to defeat Red Velvet in the quarterfinals on November 24 and Thunder Rosa in the semifinals on December 29. On January 5, 2022, she defeated Ruby Soho in the tournament final to become the TBS Champion. Cargill was named "Rookie of the Year" for 2021 by both Pro Wrestling Illustrated and the Wrestling Observer Newsletter. In mid-April 2022, she formed her own stable called the Baddies, which consisted of her, Kiera Hogan and Red Velvet. At Double or Nothing, Stokely Hathaway became her new manager, replacing Sterling. In June 2022, Leila Grey became part of the Baddies, replacing an injured Red Velvet. Around the same time, Cargill began feuding with the debuting Athena. At All Out, Cargill squashed Athena in a match that lasted less than five minutes. After defeating other challengers such as Madison Rayne and Diamante, Cargill began a feud with Nyla Rose, who stole her TBS Championship belt. The feud between the two culminated at Full Gear, where Cargill defeated Rose to retain her title. On January 5, 2023, Cargill reached the one-year mark as TBS Champion. The following week, she became the longest-reigning champion in AEW's history at 373 days, surpassing Hikaru Shida's 372-day reign as AEW Women's World Champion. She would hold this accolade until August 2025, where she was surpassed by Kazuchika Okada's 509-day reign as AEW Continental Champion.

Cargill's reign as TBS Champion lasted until Double or Nothing in May 2023. At the event, Cargill made her entrance as her line sisters from the Alpha Kappa Alpha sorority performed a dance routine to "Pretty Girls Walk" by Big Boss Vette. Cargill defeated Taya Valkyrie in a scheduled title defense, before she lost the title in an open challenge to the returning Kris Statlander in less than 50 seconds, ending both her reign (at 508 days) and her 60-match unbeaten streak. After a hiatus of several months, Cargill returned on the September 9 episode of Collision, attacking Statlander. On the September 15 episode of Rampage, Cargill lost to Statlander in a title rematch, which marked Cargill's final match in AEW. Cargill's 508-day TBS Championship reign remained as the longest reign for the title until October 17, 2025, when Mercedes Moné broke the record.

=== WWE (2023–present) ===
==== Women's Tag Team Champion (2023–2025) ====
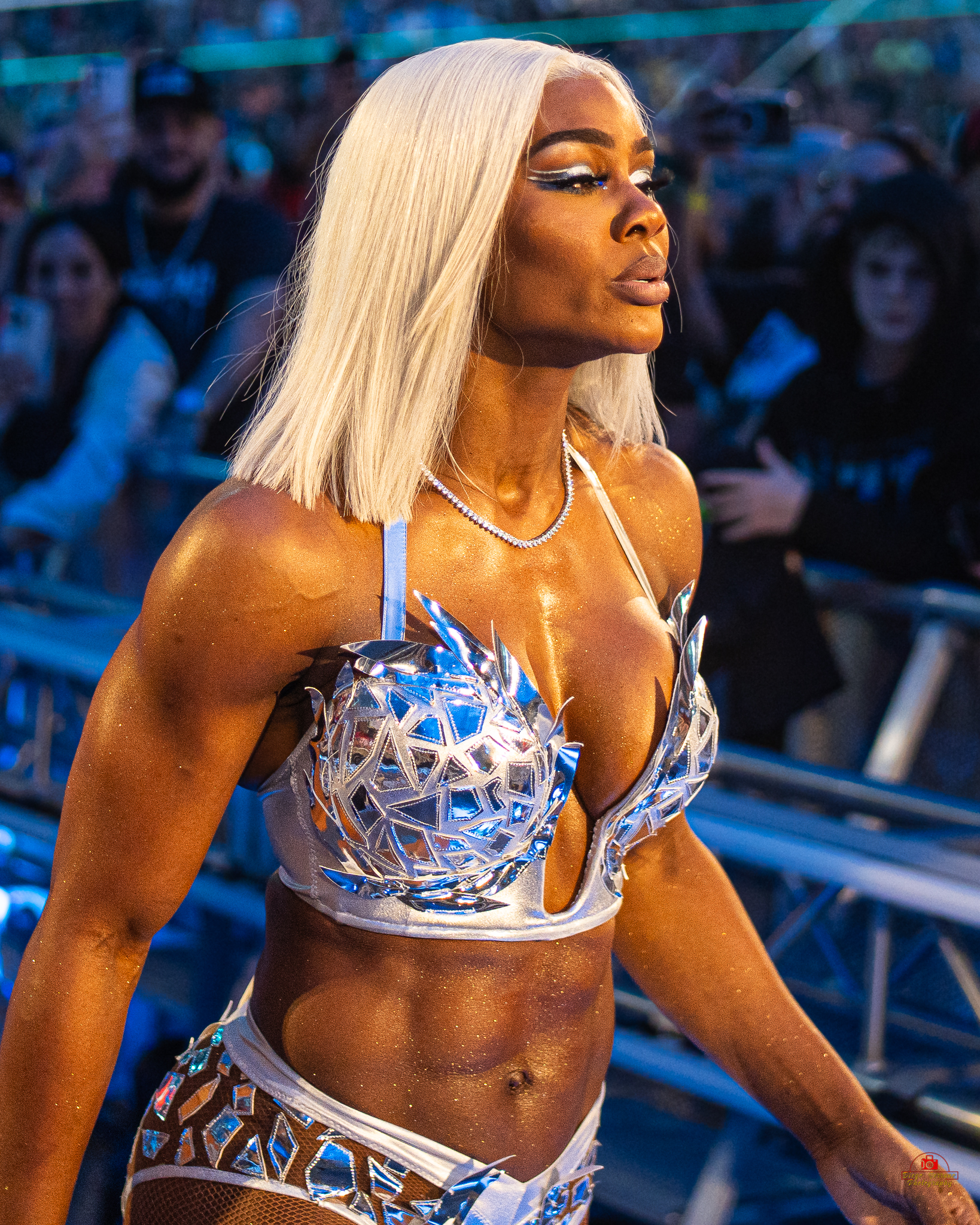
Cargill made her WWE debut at the 2024 Royal Rumble

Following Cargill's departure from AEW, she reported to the WWE Performance Center in Orlando, Florida in September 2023. Later that month, WWE announced that Cargill had signed a multi-year contract and had begun training at the Performance Center. She was WWE's first signing under TKO Group Holdings. Cargill made her first appearance on WWE programming during the Fastlane pre-show on October 7, where she was shown arriving at the arena and was met by WWE chief content officer Triple H. She subsequently made brief appearances on Raw, NXT, and SmackDown, teasing which brand she would join.

In January 2024, Cargill made her in-ring debut for WWE at the Royal Rumble, competing in the women's Royal Rumble match. She entered the match at number 28, eliminating Nia Jax, Becky Lynch, and Naomi before being eliminated by the number 30 entrant, Liv Morgan. Cargill was subsequently assigned to the SmackDown brand. She made her debut on the March 29 episode of SmackDown, saving Naomi and Bianca Belair from an attack by Damage CTRL. At WrestleMania XL, Cargill, Naomi and Belair defeated Damage CTRL in a six-woman tag team match when Cargill pinned Dakota Kai. At Backlash France, Cargill and Belair defeated the Kabuki Warriors to win the WWE Women's Tag Team Championship. Cargill then participated in the 2024 Queen of the Ring tournament; she defeated Piper Niven in the first round but was eliminated after losing to Nia Jax in the quarterfinals by disqualification. At King and Queen of the Ring, Cargill and Belair successfully defended their titles against Candice LeRae and Indi Hartwell. At Clash at the Castle: Scotland, Cargill and Belair lost the titles to the Unholy Union in a triple threat match; they regained the titles at Bash in Berlin. They then retained at Crown Jewel. In November, Cargill was written off television after she was mysteriously attacked backstage, removing her from the WarGames match at Survivor Series: WarGames. Naomi replaced her as the one-half of tag team champions in December.

In March 2025, Cargill returned at Elimination Chamber, attacking Naomi before the women's Elimination Chamber match officially started and caused Naomi to be eliminated. On the following episode of SmackDown, Naomi revealed herself as the person that attacked Cargill. On the April 4 episode, following another brawl, SmackDown general manager Nick Aldis scheduled a match between them at WrestleMania 41, the first non-title women's singles match at WrestleMania since 2006 and the first without a stipulation. Cargill won the match at night one of the event.

==== WWE Women's Champion (2025–2026) ====
In June 2025, Cargill entered the 2025 Queen of the Ring tournament. She won the tournament by defeating Asuka in the finals at Night of Champions, earning a WWE Women's Championship match at SummerSlam. On the following episode of SmackDown, Cargill was attacked by Naomi during a backstage segment, leading to a no holds barred match at Evolution which Cargill won, thus ending their feud. Cargill failed to win the WWE Women's Championship from Tiffany Stratton on Night 1 of SummerSlam. On the October 24 episode of SmackDown, Cargill appeared to save Stratton from an attack by Giulia and Kiana James, but then attacked Stratton, and turned heel. At Saturday Night's Main Event XLI, Cargill defeated Stratton to win the WWE Women's Championship. During the March 20, 2026 episode of SmackDown, Cargill formed an alliance with B-Fab and Michin after the trio attacked Rhea Ripley. At WrestleMania 42 Night 2 on April 19, Cargill lost the title to Ripley, ending her reign at 169 days. At Clash in Italy on May 31, in a WrestleMania rematch Cargill failed to regain the title from Ripley after interference from Charlotte Flair. At Night of Champions, Cargill failed to win the Women's United States Championship from Tiffany Stratton after interference from Chelsea Green and Flair. At Night 2 of SummerSlam on August 2, Cargill failed to capture the Interim WWE Women's Championship in a ladder match as it was won by Green. At Sunday Night's Main Event on September 6, Cargill, B-Fab and Michin defeated the team of Flair, Alexa Bliss and Tatum Paxley. In November, Fatal Influence (Jacy Jayne, Fallon Henley and Lainey Reid) allied with Cargill and Michin (with B-Fab) as they face Flair, Bliss, Paxley, Bayley, and Stephanie Vaquer in a WarGames match at Survivor Series: WarGames on November 28. This will be Cargill's WarGames match debut.

== Professional wrestling style and persona ==
Cargill wrestles in a powerhouse style. Her signature moves include a bicycle kick and a chickenwing facebuster which she calls Jaded. While in AEW, she was nicknamed That Bitch.

Cargill has credited wrestler Chyna and X-Men character Storm as her inspirations. She has also cited Jacqueline Moore and Jazz as being among her favorite wrestlers.

== Other media ==
=== Film ===
Year	Title	Role	Notes	Ref.
TBA	True Threat	Meeka	Acting debut	

=== Television ===
Year	Title	Role	Notes	Ref.
2021	Rhodes to the Top	Herself	—N/a	—N/a
2024	Celebrity Family Feud	Herself	Episode: "Men of WWE vs. Women of WWE"	—N/a

=== Video games ===
Year	Title	Notes	Ref.
2023	AEW Fight Forever	Video game debut	
2024	WWE 2K24	Global Superstars Pack DLC	
2025	WWE 2K25	—N/a	
2026	WWE 2K26	—N/a	

== Personal life ==
Cargill met her partner, former Cincinnati Reds second baseman Brandon Phillips, in 2015; the couple have a daughter together. In March 2023, Cargill and Phillips were announced as owners of the Texas Smoke, the fourth franchise of Women's Professional Fastpitch (WPF), based in Austin, Texas. Cargill's cousin Peter Cargill played for the Jamaica national football team in the 1980s and 1990s. Cargill's mother died in December 2023 due to cancer.

== Basketball career statistics ==
Legend
GP	Games played	GS	Games started	MPG	Minutes per game	RPG	Rebounds per game
APG	Assists per game	SPG	Steals per game	BPG	Blocks per game	PPG	Points per game
TO	Turnovers per game	FG%	Field-goal percentage	3P%	3-point field-goal percentage	FT%	Free-throw percentage
**Bold**	Career best	°	League leader

=== College ===
Year	Team	GP	GS	MPG	FG%	3P%	FT%	RPG	APG	SPG	BPG	TO	PPG
2010–11	Jacksonville	27	0	11.5	36.2	36.2	57.9	2.7	0.1	0.8	0.2	**0.6**	2.9
2011–12	Jacksonville	**31**	**27**	23.7	38.9	38.9	**72.3**	**8.3**	0.5	**1.8**	0.2	1.5	**9.8**
2012–13	Jacksonville	29	27	**26.8**	38.1	38.3	72.0	7.8	**1.4**	1.7	**0.7**	2.0	**9.8**
2013–14	Jacksonville	30	5	20.8	**42.0**	**42.2**	64.3	6.4	0.7	1.1	0.0	1.6	8.0
**Career**		117	59	20.9	39.1	39.3	69.0	6.4	0.7	1.4	0.3	1.4	7.7
Statistics retrieved from Sports Reference.

== Championships and accomplishments ==
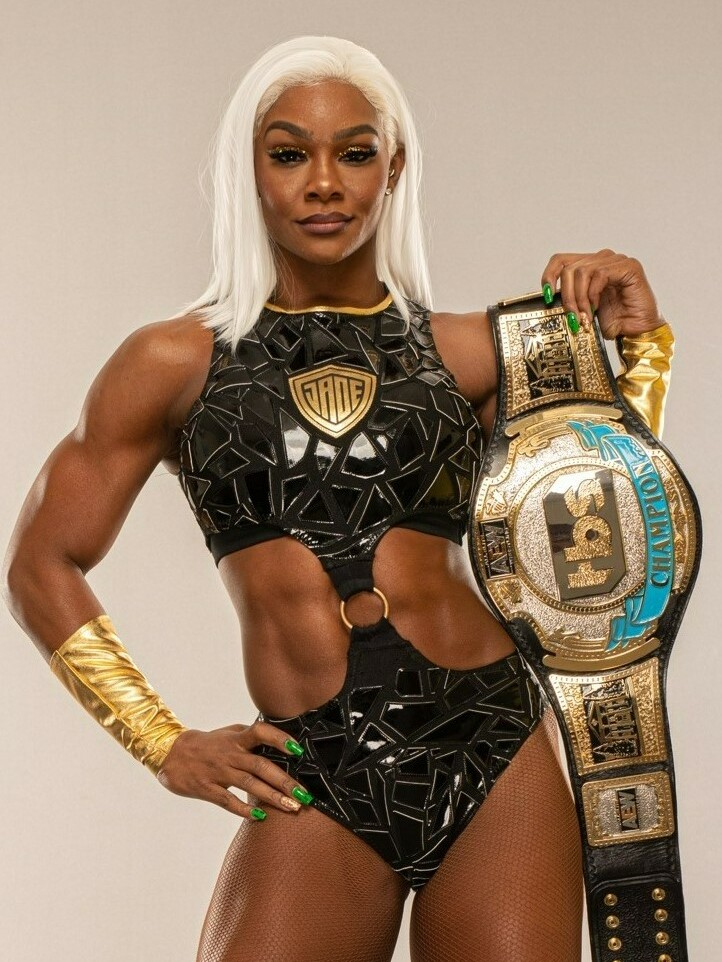
Cargill is a former one-time AEW TBS Champion.

- All Elite Wrestling
  - AEW TBS Championship (1 time, inaugural)
  - TBS Championship Tournament (2022)
  - AEW Dynamite Award (1 time)
    - Breakout Star – Female (2022)
- Pro Wrestling Illustrated
  - Ranked No. 5 of the top 150 female wrestlers in the PWI Women's 150 in 2022
  - Ranked No. 1 of the top 100 tag teams in the PWI Tag Team 100 in 2024 – with Bianca Belair
  - Rookie of the Year (2021)
  - Tag Team of the Year (2024) – with Bianca Belair
- Wrestling Observer Newsletter
  - Rookie of the Year (2021)
- WWE
  - WWE Women's Championship (1 time)
  - WWE Women's Tag Team Championship (2 times) – with Bianca Belair
  - Queen of the Ring (2025)
  - Slammy Award (1 time)
    - Tag Team of the Year (2025) – with Bianca Belair
