= Championships in Total Nonstop Action Wrestling =

Total Nonstop Action Wrestling has maintained at least one primary world championship and tag team championship for its male performers since 2002.

For their female performers, a world championship and tag team championship existed from 2007 and 2009. The tag team title was abandoned in 2013. In 2020 Impact Wrestling re-introduced the Knockouts tag team championship.

During the first five years of the promotion, founder Jeff Jarrett had an agreement with the National Wrestling Alliance (NWA) to use the NWA World Heavyweight Championship and NWA World Tag Team Championship. On May 13, 2007, the NWA announced it would end their relationship with TNA Wrestling effective immediately stripping Christian Cage and Team 3D of their titles.

On May 14, 2007, Following the end of the NWA relationship Total Nonstop Action Wrestling introduced new official TNA Championship belts. In September 2007, TNA first announced through their TNA Mobile service that they planned to start an official women's division and debut a women's title soon. On October 14, TNA introduced the Knockouts Championship at Bound for Glory event to crown the inaugural Champion.

== Overview of titles ==
=== Male ===
#	Name	Years
1	NWA World Heavyweight Championship	2002 – 2007 (Used as a part of an agreement with the NWA)
2	TNA World Championship	2007 – present
3	NWA World Tag Team Championship	2002 – 2007 (Used as a part of an agreement with the NWA)
4	TNA World Tag Team Championship	2007 – present

=== Female ===
#	Name	Years
1	TNA Knockouts World Championship	2007 – present
2	TNA Knockouts World Tag Team Championship	2009 – 2013, 2020 – present

== Superlative reigns ==
=== Male ===
==== Top 10 World Championship reigns ====
The following list shows the top 10 World Championship reigns in Impact Wrestling history.

No.	Team	Title	Reign	Length (days)	Notes
1	Josh Alexander	Impact World Championship	2	335	
2	Jeff Jarrett	NWA World Heavyweight Championship	3	305	
3	Bobby Roode	TNA World Heavyweight Championship	1	256	
4	AJ Styles	TNA World Heavyweight Championship	1	211	
5	Jeff Jarrett	NWA World Heavyweight Championship	1	203	
6	Johnny Impact	Impact World Championship	1	196	
7	Sting	TNA World Heavyweight Championship	2	189	
8	Rich Swann	Impact World Championship	1	183	
9	Moose	TNA World Championship	1	182	
10	Jeff Jarrett	NWA World Heavyweight Championship	2	182	
11	Samoa Joe	TNA World Heavyweight Championship	1	182	

==== Longest per championship ====
The following list shows the longest reigning champion for each world championship created and/or promoted by Impact Wrestling.

No.	Champion	Title	Reign	Dates held	Length (days)	Notes
1	Jeff Jarrett	NWA World Heavyweight Championship	3	June 2, 2004 – April 3, 2005	305	
2	Josh Alexander	Impact World Championship	2	April 23, 2022 – March 24, 2023	335	

==== Most reigns per championship ====
The following list shows the wrestlers with the most reigns for each world championship created and/or promoted by Impact Wrestling.

No.	Champion	Title	No. of reigns	Notes
1	Jeff Jarrett	NWA World Heavyweight Championship	6	
2	Kurt Angle	TNA World Championship	6	

==== Most total World Championship reigns ====
The following list shows the wrestlers who have the most world championship reigns in total, combining all titles they have held as recognized by TNA. This list also shows the titles that they won to achieve this record (minimum two world championship reigns).

No.	Champion	Titles	No. of Reigns	Notes
1	Kurt Angle	TNA World Heavyweight Championship (6 times); IWGP Heavyweight Championship (1 time)	7	
2	Jeff Jarrett	NWA World Heavyweight Championship (6 times)	6	
3	AJ Styles	NWA World Heavyweight Championship (3 times); TNA World Heavyweight Championship (2 times)	5	
3	Sting	NWA World Heavyweight Championship (1 time); TNA World Heavyweight Championship (4 times)	5	
5	Lashley	TNA World Heavyweight Championship (4 times)	4	During his fourth reign the title was known as the Impact World Heavyweight Championship
6	Austin Aries	Impact World Championship (3 times)	3	During his first reign the title was known as the TNA World Heavyweight Championship
6	Christian Cage	NWA World Heavyweight Championship (2 times); Impact World Championship (1 time)	3	
6	Jeff Hardy	TNA World Heavyweight Championship (3 times)	3	
6	Moose	TNA World Championship (2 times); TNA World Heavyweight Championship (1 time)	3	
10	Bobby Roode	TNA World Heavyweight Championship (2 times)	2	
10	Bully Ray	TNA World Heavyweight Championship (2 times)	2	
10	Ethan Carter III	TNA World Heavyweight Championship (2 times)	2	
10	Eric Young	Impact World Championship (2 times)	2	During his first reign the title was known as the TNA World Heavyweight Championship
10	Eddie Edwards	Impact World Championship (2 times)	2	During his first reign the title was known as the TNA World Heavyweight Championship
10	Matt Hardy	TNA World Heavyweight Championship (2 times)	2	
10	Mr. Anderson	TNA World Heavyweight Championship (2 times)	2	
10	Josh Alexander	Impact World Championship (2 times)	2	
10	Rich Swann	Impact World Championship (1 time); TNA World Heavyweight Championship (1 time)	2	
10	Ron Killings	NWA World Heavyweight Championship (2 times)	2	

==== Top 10 Tag Team Championship reigns ====
The following list shows the top 10 tag team championship reigns in Impact Wrestling history.

No.	Team	Title	Reign	Length (days)	Notes
1	The North (Ethan Page and Josh Alexander)	Impact World Tag Team Championship	1	380	
2	The Latin American Xchange (Ortiz and Santana)	Impact World Tag Team Championship	3	261	
3	America's Most Wanted (Chris Harris and James Storm)	NWA World Tag Team Championship	6	250	
4	The Good Brothers (Doc Gallows and Karl Anderson)	Impact World Tag Team Championship	2	231	
5	Beer Money, Inc. (Robert Roode and James Storm)	TNA World Tag Team Championship	4	212	
6	Decay (Abyss and Crazzy Steve)	TNA World Tag Team Championship	1	197	
7	The Wolves (Davey Richards and Eddie Edwards)	TNA World Tag Team Championship	5	186	
8	Christian's Coalition (AJ Styles and Tomko)	TNA World Tag Team Championship	1	184	
9	The Motor City Machine Guns (Alex Shelley and Chris Sabin)	TNA World Tag Team Championship	1	182	
10	The Latin American Xchange (Hernandez and Homicide)	NWA World Tag Team Championship	2	175	

==== Longest per championship ====
The following list shows the longest reigning champion for each tag team championship created and/or promoted by Impact Wrestling.

Title	Champion	Reign	Dates held	Length (days)	Notes
NWA World Tag Team Championship	America's Most Wanted (Chris Harris and James Storm)	6	October 11, 2005 – June 18, 2006	250	
Impact World Tag Team Championship	The North (Ethan Page and Josh Alexander)	1	July 5, 2019 – July 19, 2020	380	

==== Most reigns per championship ====
The following list shows the wrestlers with the most reigns for each tag team championship created and/or promoted by Impact Wrestling.

No.	Champion	Title	No. of reigns	Notes
1	America's Most Wanted (Chris Harris and James Storm)	NWA World Tag Team Championship	6	
2	The Wolves (Davey Richards and Eddie Edwards)	Impact World Tag Team Championship	5	
2	Beer Money, Inc. (Bobby Roode and James Storm)	Impact World Tag Team Championship	5	

==== Most total Tag Team Championship reigns ====
The following list shows the wrestlers who have the most tag team championship reigns in total as individuals, combining all titles they have held as recognized by Impact Wrestling. This list also shows the titles that they won to achieve this record. (minimum five tag team championship reigns).

No.	Champion	Titles	No. of Reigns	Notes
1	James Storm	NWA World Tag Team Championship (7 times); TNA World Tag Team Championship (7 times)	14	
2	Bobby Roode	NWA World Tag Team Championship (2 times); TNA World Tag Team Championship (6 times)	8	
2	Christopher Daniels	NWA World Tag Team Championship (6 times); TNA World Tag Team Championship (2 times)	8	
3	Chris Harris	NWA World Tag Team Championship (7 times)	7	
3	Hernandez	NWA World Tag Team Championship (2 tines); TNA World Tag Team Championship (5 times)	7	
3	Eric Young	NWA World Tag Team Championship (2 times); TNA World Tag Team Championship (4 times); TNA Knockouts Tag Team Championship (1 time)	7	During two reigns the TNA World Tag Team Championship were known as the Impact World Tag Team Championship
6	AJ Styles	NWA World Tag Team Championship (4 times); TNA World Tag Team Championship (2 times)	6	
6	Eddie Edwards	TNA World Tag Team Championship (6 times)	6	
8	Brother Devon	NWA World Tag Team Championship (1 time); TNA World Tag Team Championship (2 times); IWGP Tag Team Championship (2 times)	5	
8	Brother Ray	NWA World Tag Team Championship (1 time); TNA World Tag Team Championship (2 times); IWGP Tag Team Championship (2 times)	5	
8	Davey Richards	TNA World Tag Team Championship (5 times)	5	

=== Female ===
==== Top 10 Women's World Championship reigns ====
The following list shows the top 10 Women's World Championship reigns in Impact Wrestling history.

No.	Team	Title	Reign	Length (days)	Notes
1	Taya Valkyrie	Impact Knockouts Championship	1	377	
2	Deonna Purrazzo	Impact Knockouts Championship	2	343	
3	Taryn Terrell	TNA Knockouts Championship	1	279	
4	Rosemary	TNA Knockouts Championship	1	266	
5	Gail Kim	TNA Knockouts Championship	5	232	
6	Gail Kim	TNA Knockouts Championship	2	210	
7	Jordynne Grace	Impact Knockouts World Championship	2	208	
8	Madison Rayne	TNA Knockouts Championship	3	188	
9	Jordynne Grace	Impact Knockouts Championship	1	182	
10	Awesome Kong	TNA Knockouts Championship	2	178	

==== Top 10 Women's tag team championship reigns ====
The following list shows the top 10 women's tag team championship reigns in Impact Wrestling history.

No.	Team	Title	Reign	Length (days)	Notes
1	Eric Young and ODB	TNA Knockouts Tag Team Championship	1	478	
2	The Death Dollz (Jessicka, Rosemary and Taya Valkyrie)	Impact Knockouts World Tag Team Championship	1	142	
3	The Beautiful People (Lacey Von Erich, Madison Rayne and Velvet Sky)	TNA Knockouts Tag Team Championship	1	141	
4	The IInspiration (Jessie McKay and Cassie Lee)	Impact Knockouts World Tag Team Championship	1	133	
5	Hamada and Taylor Wilde	TNA Knockouts Tag Team Championship	1	132	
6	Gail Kim and Madison Rayne	TNA Knockouts Tag Team Championship	1	125	
7	Mexican America (Rosita and Sarita)	TNA Knockouts Tag Team Championship	1	121	
8	Sarita and Taylor Wilde	TNA Knockouts Tag Team Championship	1	106	
9	TnT (Brooke Tessmacher and Tara)	TNA Knockouts Tag Team Championship	1	106	
10	The Influence (Madison Rayne and Tenille Dashwood)	Impact Knockouts World Tag Team Championship	1	106	

== Total reigns ==
=== Most total Championship reigns ===
The following list shows the wrestlers who have the most championship reigns in total, combining all titles they have held as recognized by Impact Wrestling. This list also shows the titles that they won to achieve this record.

No.	Champion	Titles	No. of Reigns	Notes
1	AJ Styles	NWA World Heavyweight Championship (3 times); TNA World Heavyweight Championship (2 times); TNA Legends/Global/Television Championship (2 times); TNA X Division Championship (6 times); NWA World Tag Team Championship (4 times); TNA World Tag Team Championship (2 times)	19	
2	James Storm	TNA World Heavyweight Championship (1 time); TNA King of the Mountain Championship (1 time); NWA World Tag Team Championship (7 times); TNA World Tag Team Championship (7 times)	16	
3	Eric Young	Impact World Championship (2 times); TNA Legends/Global/Television/King of the Mountain Championship (3 times); TNA X Division Championship (1 time); NWA World Tag Team Championship (2 times); TNA World Tag Team Championship (4 times); TNA Knockouts Tag Team Championship (1 time)	13	During his first reign as World Champion the title was known as the TNA World Heavyweight Championship and during two reigns the Tag Team title was known as the Impact World Tag Team Championship
4	Chris Sabin	TNA World Heavyweight Championship (1 time); TNA X Division Championship (8 times); Impact World Tag Team Championship (3 times)	12	During his first reign the title was known as the TNA World Tag Team Championship
5	Austin Aries	Impact World Championship (3 times); Impact Grand Championship (1 time); TNA X Division Championship (6 times); TNA World Tag Team Championship (1 time)	11	During his first reign the title was known as the TNA World Heavyweight Championship
5	Bobby Roode	TNA World Heavyweight Championship (2 times); TNA King of the Mountain Championship (1 times); NWA World Tag Team Championship (2 times); TNA World Tag Team Championship (6 times)	11	
5	Christopher Daniels	TNA X Division Championship (3 times); TNA World Tag Team Championship (2 times); NWA World Tag Team Championship (6 times)	11	
6	Kurt Angle	TNA World Heavyweight Championship (6 times); IWGP Heavyweight Championship (1 time); TNA X Division Championship (1 time); TNA World Tag Team Championship (2 times)	10	

== See also ==
- List of current champions in Impact Wrestling
- List of former championships in Impact Wrestling
