= List of current champions in TNA Wrestling =

Total Nonstop Action Wrestling (TNA) is an American professional wrestling promotion based in Nashville, Tennessee. Title reigns are either determined by professional wrestling matches or are awarded to a wrestler as a result of the culmination of various scripted storylines. There are three active singles championships and one active tag team championship for male wrestlers, with two singles and a tag team championship specifically for female wrestlers (though on some rare occasions a title has been held by someone of the opposite gender).

Nine wrestlers currently hold the championships. The list includes the number of times the wrestler has held the title, the date and location of the win, and a description of the winning bout. The following is correct as of November 21, 2026.

== Overview ==
=== Men ===
At the top of the TNA championship hierarchy is the TNA World Championship. The championship is currently held by first-time champion Leon Slater, who defeated Nic Nemeth in his Option C title opportunity at Bound for Glory on October 11, 2026.

The secondary titles are the TNA International Championship and TNA X Division Championship. The current TNA International Champion is first-time champion A. J. Francis, who defeated Jason Hotch on the November 19, 2026 taping of Thursday Night Impact! (air date TBD). The current TNA X Division Champion is four-time champion Amazing Red, who defeated BDE, Cedric Alexander, Fabian Aichner, KC Navarro, Rich Swann, and Ryan Nemeth in a seven-way scramble at Bound for Glory to win the vacant title. The title was previously vacated by Leon Slater to invoke Option C for a TNA World Championship match at Bound for Glory.

The TNA World Tag Team Championship is currently held by two-time champions The Nemeths (Nic Nemeth and Ryan Nemeth). They won the title by defeating The Hardys (Matt Hardy and Jeff Hardy) in a Steel Cage tornado tag team match at Lockdown on August 23, 2026.

A wrestler who has held the World, X Division, and Tag Team Championships is recognized to have won the TNA Triple Crown. If any winner of the Triple Crown has also won the International Championship or either the TNA Television Championship or the Impact Grand Championship (both defunct), they are also recognized to have won the TNA Grand Slam.

=== Women ===
The top singles championship specifically contested for female wrestlers - promoted as the Knockouts division - is the TNA Knockouts World Championship, which is currently held by first-time champion Indi Hartwell, who defeated Xia Brookside at Bound for Glory on October 11, 2026.

The secondary championship for female wrestlers is the TNA Knockouts Television Championship. The current champion is first-time champion Elayna Black. She won the title by defeating M by Elegance on the November 19, 2026 taping of Thursday Night Impact! (air date TBD).

The championship for female tag teams is the TNA Knockouts World Tag Team Championship, which is held by first-time champions Apex (Zoey Serrano and Shayna Baszler). They defeated Allie and Kiera Hogan at Bound for Glory on October 11, 2026.

A female wrestler who has held the Knockouts, Knockouts Tag Team and now defunct TNA Digital Media Championship. is considered to have won the Knockouts Triple Crown.

== Current champions ==
As of November 21, 2026

=== Men's division ===
Singles

Championship	Current champion(s)	Reign	Date won	Days held	Location	Notes	Ref.
TNA World Championship	Leon Slater	1	October 11, 2026	41	Tampa, Florida	Defeated Nic Nemeth in his Option C title opportunity at Bound for Glory.	
TNA International Championship	A. J. Francis	1	November 19, 2026	2	Calgary, Alberta, Canada	Defeated Jason Hotch during theThursday Night Impact! tapings. (Air date TBD)	
TNA X Division Championship	Amazing Red	4	October 11, 2026	41	Tampa, Florida	Defeated BDE, Cedric Alexander, Fabian Aichner, KC Navarro, Rich Swann, and Ryan Nemeth in a seven-way scramble at Bound for Glory to win the vacant title.	

Tag team

Championship	Current champions	Reign	Date won	Days held	Location	Notes	Ref.
TNA World Tag Team Championship	The Nemeths (Nic Nemeth and Ryan Nemeth)	2	August 23, 2026	90	Chicago, Illinois	Defeated The Hardys (Matt Hardy and Jeff Hardy) in a Steel Cage tornado tag team match at Lockdown.	

=== Knockouts (Women's) division ===
Singles

Championship	Current champion	Reign	Date won	Days held	Location	Notes	Ref.
TNA Knockouts World Championship	Indi Hartwell	1	October 11, 2026	41	Tampa, Florida	Defeated Xia Brookside at Bound for Glory.	
TNA Knockouts Television Championship	Elayna Black	1	November 19, 2026	2	Calgary, Alberta, Canada	Defeated M by Elegance during the Thursday Night Impact! tapings. (Air date TBD)	

Tag team

Championship	Current champions	Reign	Date won	Days held	Location	Notes	Ref.
TNA Knockouts World Tag Team Championship	Apex (Zoey Serrano and Shayna Baszler)	1	October 11, 2026	41	Tampa, Florida	Defeated Allie and Kiera Hogan at Bound for Glory.	

== See also ==
- Championships in Total Nonstop Action Wrestling
- List of former championships in Total Nonstop Action Wrestling
- List of TNA personnel
