= List of former championships in Total Nonstop Action Wrestling =

In professional wrestling, championships are competed for in scripted storylines by a promotion's roster of contracted wrestlers. Total Nonstop Action Wrestling (TNA, formerly Impact Wrestling) is a Nashville, Tennessee-based professional wrestling promotion. The promotion was founded in 2002; in the company's 23-year history, fourteen different unique championships, some originating from other promotions, have been promoted by TNA and later abandoned by the promotion. The following is a list of the promotion's former championships that were once active and contended for by its roster.

== Defunct championships promoted by TNA ==
This section of championships are a list of titles which were exclusive to TNA.

Sanctioned

No.	Championship	Date of introduction	First champion(s)	Date retired	Final champion(s)	Years active	Notes
1	TNA King of the Mountain Championship (Note: Was known as the TNA Legends Championship from 2008–2009, the TNA Global Championship from 2009–2010, and the TNA Television Championship from 2010–2014.)	October 23, 2008	Booker T	August 13, 2016	Bobby Lashley	8	The title was unified with the TNA World Heavyweight Championship by Lashley and officially deactivated by TNA President Billy Corgan.
2	Impact Grand Championship	October 2, 2016	Aron Rex	June 4, 2018	Austin Aries	2	Aries unified the title with the Impact World Championship during a press conference before Slammiversary XVI.
3	TNA World Heavyweight Championship	April 8–10, 2020 (Note: This date marks the introduction of title as an unofficial unsanctioned championship. The championship received official recognition from Impact Wrestling on February 23, 2021.)	Moose	March 13, 2021	Rich Swann	1	Moose was defeated by Impact World Champion Rich Swann to unified the championships.
4	TNA Digital Media Championship	September 30, 2021	Jordynne Grace	March 29, 2025	Steph De Lander	1	Executive Santino Marella stripped Steph De Lander from the title replacing it with the TNA International Championship.

Unsanctioned

No.	Championship	Date of introduction	First champion(s)	Date retired	Final champion(s)	Months active	Notes
1	TNA World Beer Drinking Championship	November 11, 2007	James Storm	February 26, 2008	James Storm	4	Rhino destroyed the championship belt, thus deactivating the title. This episode aired on tape delay on March 6, 2008.

== Past championships used by TNA ==
Promotion	Championship	Last TNA champion	Reign
World Wrestling Entertainment	NXT Tag Team Championship	The Hardy Boyz	October 7, 2025 – October 25, 2025
All Elite Wrestling	AEW World Championship	Kenny Omega	December 2, 2020 – November 13, 2021
Lucha Libre AAA World Wide	AAA Mega Championship (Note: Referred to as the "Mexican Heavyweight Championship" by TNA.)	Jeff Jarrett	June 18, 2011 – March 18, 2012
Lucha Libre AAA World Wide	AAA Reina de Reinas Championship	Deonna Purrazzo	August 14, 2021 – April 23, 2022
Inoki Genome Federation	IWGP Heavyweight Championship (Note: Referred to as the "IWGP World Heavyweight Championship" by TNA.)	Kurt Angle	June 29, 2007 – February 17, 2008
Global Force Wrestling	GFW Global Championship	Alberto El Patrón	April 22, 2017 – July 2, 2017
Global Force Wrestling	GFW Women's Championship	Sienna	April 21, 2017 – July 2, 2017
Global Force Wrestling	GFW Tag Team Championship	The Latin American Xchange (Ortiz and Santana)	April 23, 2017 – July 2, 2017
Global Force Wrestling	GFW NEX*GEN Championship	Cody Rhodes (Note: Won the championship as Cody Rhodes, but defended it in Impact Wrestling as Cody.)	Nov 25, 2016 – June 2, 2017
Lutte Internationale	International Heavyweight Championship (Note: Referred to as the "Canadian International Heavyweight Championship" by TNA.)	PCO	July 20, 2024 - present (independent of TNA since January 19, 2025)
National Wrestling Alliance	NWA Worlds Heavyweight Championship (Note: Referred to as the "NWA World Heavyweight Championship" by TNA.)	Christian Cage	January 14, 2007 – May 13, 2007
National Wrestling Alliance	NWA World Women's Championship	Leilani Kai	March 12, 2003 – June 19, 2004
National Wrestling Alliance	NWA World Tag Team Championship	Team 3D (Brother Ray and Brother Devon)	April 15, 2007 – May 13, 2007
New Japan Pro-Wrestling	IWGP Tag Team Championship (Note: Referred to as the "IWGP World Tag Team Championship" by TNA.)	Team 3D (Brother Ray and Brother Devon)	October 18, 2009 – January 4, 2010
New Japan Pro-Wrestling	IWGP Junior Heavyweight Tag Team Championship	The Motor City Machine Guns (Alex Shelley and Chris Sabin)	January 4, 2009 – July 5, 2009
Ring of Honor	ROH Women's World Championship	Deonna Purrazzo	January 9, 2022 – May 4, 2022

== See also ==
- List of current champions in TNA Wrestling
- List of Total Nonstop Action Wrestling alumni
- List of Total Nonstop Action Wrestling tournaments
