= Grand Slam (professional wrestling) =

Professional wrestling accomplishment

The Grand Slam is an accomplishment recognized by various professional wrestling promotions in the United States and Japan. It is a distinction given to a professional wrestler who has either won four specific championships within a promotion throughout their career, or all available championships. (Note: Oftentimes both, as was the case during WWE's original 1997 introduction of the term, and during its 2015 revision.) Promotions that recognize this include WWE (since 1997), Total Nonstop Action Wrestling (since 2009), Ring of Honor (since 2018), New Japan Pro-Wrestling (since 2021), and All Elite Wrestling (since 2025). The four titles typically include three singles championships, one of them usually being a world title, plus a tag team championship.

== U.S. national promotions ==
=== WWE ===
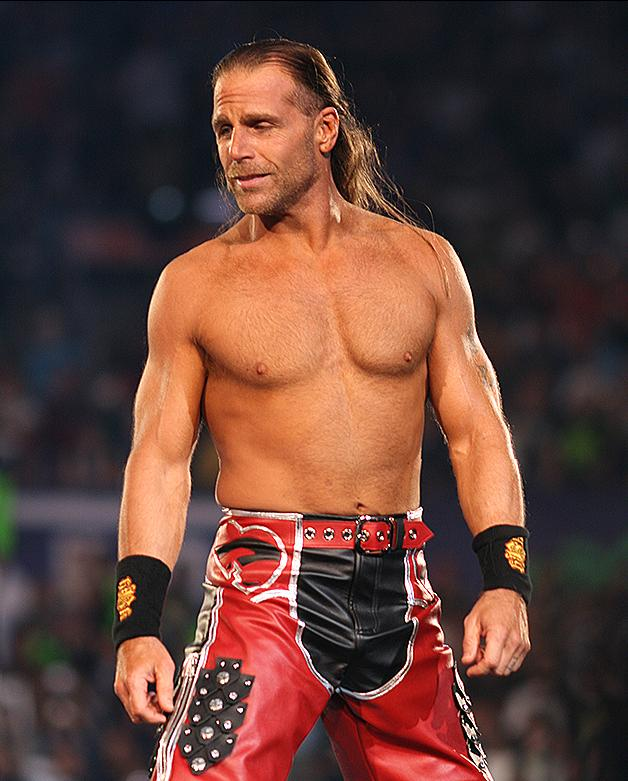
Shawn Michaels, the first WWF/E Grand Slam winner

In WWE (formerly WWF), the term "Grand Slam" was originally used by Shawn Michaels to describe himself upon winning the European Championship on September 20, 1997. Michaels previously held the WWF Championship, Intercontinental Championship, and the World Tag Team Championship—the titles that composed the Triple Crown.

In May 2001, the promotion's website indicated that the Hardcore Championship was an acceptable substitute for the European Championship in the Grand Slam. Kane, who had defeated Triple H for the Intercontinental Championship at Judgment Day on May 20, 2001, was acknowledged as a Grand Slam winner as he had "become the only superstar in World Wrestling Federation history that has held the Intercontinental title as well as the Hardcore, Tag Team and WWF titles".

In April 2006, Kurt Angle was noted as being a former Grand Slam winner on WWE.com, having won the WWE, WWE Tag Team, Intercontinental, and European Championship, indicating that WWE considered the WWE Tag Team Championship to be an acceptable substitute for the World Tag Team Championship. In August 2007, WWE.com published an article listing Shawn Michaels' championship reigns that completed the Grand Slam. They included the WWE, World Heavyweight, World Tag Team, Intercontinental, and European Championship. The inclusion of the World Heavyweight Championship indicated that WWE considered the title to be an acceptable substitute for the WWE Championship in completing the Grand Slam.

At ECW One Night Stand in June 2006, Rob Van Dam became the first superstar acquired by WWE after the purchase of World Championship Wrestling and Extreme Championship Wrestling in 2001 to complete the Grand Slam when he defeated John Cena for the WWE Championship. Booker T became the second star acquired by the purchase to complete the Grand Slam when he defeated Rey Mysterio for the World Heavyweight Championship at The Great American Bash in July 2006. Booker has held the World Tag Team, Intercontinental, and Hardcore titles. Also in 2006, WWE revived the ECW Championship and established it as a third world championship in its promotion. Despite this, however, the ECW Championship was never considered as a world title that was part of WWE's Grand Slam eligibility.

Following WrestleMania 31 in 2015, WWE (which four years earlier ended the brand extension and unified several titles before that) established an updated version of the Grand Slam consisting of the four then-active men's titles in WWE: the WWE World, Intercontinental, United States, and WWE Tag Team Championships. Thirteen wrestlers have been recognized as Grand Slam winners under these new parameters (including five who were already recognized as Grand Slam winners under the original guidelines). The brand extension was re-established a year later in 2016 and WWE indicated that two new championships that had been introduced, the Universal Championship (which would be retired in April 2024) and the SmackDown Tag Team Championship, would count as acceptable substitutes for their counterpart titles (WWE Championship and WWE Tag Team, now World Tag Team, respectively) as part of the Grand Slam.

Chris Jericho completed the original format the fastest, completing it in 728 days between December 1999 and December 2001, while Kurt Angle completed the modern format the fastest, completing it in 966 days between February 2000 and October 2002. John Cena took the longest time to complete the modern format, doing so in 7,911 days between March 2004 and November 2025.

On February 21, 2021, WWE acknowledged The Miz as the first wrestler to complete the Grand Slam twice under the revised 2015 format after winning his second WWE Championship.

In May 2023, WWE added another world championship with a new version of the World Heavyweight Championship. As of 2026, it is still unclear if this title has been added as an acceptable substitute for WWE's Grand Slam.

==== List of WWE Grand Slam winners ====
As of November 15, 2026, there have been 23 individual Grand Slam Champions. 18 wrestlers have only achieved it once; 7 under the original format and 11 under the modern format, while five wrestlers have achieved the Grand Slam under both formats, three of whom automatically became modern Grand Slam champions at the introduction of the modern format (with the same titles they won while becoming original Grand Slam champions), and two who became modern Grand Slam champions after the modern format was introduced (with different titles won to complete both formats).

Text
Dates in **bold**	The date the wrestler completed the Grand Slam
Names in **bold**	Indicates Grand Slam winner under both formats
Dates in italics	The wrestler has won that title, but does not contribute to their Grand Slam because they had already won the Grand Slam or they had already won a title at the same level
——	Indicates future reigns are impossible due to retirement, death, or title discontinuation
Colors
	Won all Grand Slam eligible titles under either format
	Won title as a member of the Raw brand
	Won title as a member of the SmackDown brand
	Won title as a member of the ECW brand
	Won title as a member of the NXT brand
	Won title when the brand extension was not in effect

===== Original format (established 1997) =====
Champion	Primary championships (either needed)		Secondary championship	Tag team championships (either needed)		Tertiary championships (either needed)	
Champion	WWF/WWE	World Heavyweight	Intercontinental	WWF/World Tag Team	WWE/Raw/World Tag Team	European	Hardcore
Shawn Michaels	March 31, 1996	November 17, 2002	October 27, 1992	August 28, 1994 (with Diesel)	December 13, 2009 (with Triple H)	**September 20, 1997**	——
Triple H	August 23, 1999	September 2, 2002	October 21, 1996	**April 29, 2001** (with Stone Cold Steve Austin)	December 13, 2009 (with Shawn Michaels)	December 11, 1997	——
Kane	June 28, 1998	July 18, 2010	**May 20, 2001**	July 13, 1998 (with Mankind)	April 19, 2011 (with Big Show)	——	April 1, 2001
**Chris Jericho**	**December 9, 2001**	September 7, 2008	December 12, 1999	May 21, 2001 (with Chris Benoit)	June 28, 2009 (with Edge)	April 2, 2000	May 28, 2001
**Kurt Angle**	October 22, 2000	January 10, 2006	February 27, 2000	——	**October 20, 2002** (with Chris Benoit)	February 8, 2000	September 10, 2001
**Eddie Guerrero**	**February 15, 2004**	——	September 4, 2000	——	November 17, 2002 (with Chavo Guerrero Jr.)	April 3, 2000	——
Rob Van Dam	**June 11, 2006**	——	March 17, 2002	March 31, 2003 (with Kane)	December 7, 2004 (with Rey Mysterio)	July 22, 2002	July 22, 2001
Booker T	——	**July 23, 2006**	July 7, 2003	October 30, 2001 (with Test)	——	——	May 4, 2002
**Jeff Hardy**	**December 14, 2008**	June 7, 2009	April 10, 2001	June 29, 1999 (with Matt Hardy)	April 2, 2017 (with Matt Hardy)	July 8, 2002	July 10, 2001
John "Bradshaw" Layfield	June 27, 2004	——	**March 9, 2009**	May 25, 1999 (with Faarooq)	——	October 22, 2001	June 3, 2002
Christian		**May 1, 2011**	September 23, 2001	April 2, 2000 (with Edge)		October 30, 2001	March 17, 2002
**Big Show**	November 14, 1999	December 18, 2011	**April 1, 2012**	August 22, 1999 (with The Undertaker)	July 26, 2009 (with Chris Jericho)	——	February 25, 2001

===== Revised format (established 2015) =====
The modern WWE Grand Slam consists of the WWE, Intercontinental, United States, and World Tag Team (formerly WWE/Raw Tag Team) Championships. Two other championships—the Universal and WWE Tag Team (formerly SmackDown Tag Team) Championships—were added in 2016 as alternative titles to the WWE title and Tag Team Championships respectively following the reintroduction of the brand extension. In regards to the United States Champion, due to its lineage, WWE only counts United States Championship reigns that took place in WWE since 2001, whether it bore the WCW or WWE moniker. For example, Edge and Kurt Angle each held the title when it was still referred to as the WCW United States Championship. Eddie Guerrero’s first reign does not count as a result of this rule, since it took place in WCW.

Champion	Primary championships (either needed)		Secondary championships (both needed)		Tag team championships (either needed)	
Champion	WWF/WWE	Universal	Intercontinental	United States	WWE/Raw/World Tag Team	SmackDown/WWE Tag Team
**Kurt Angle**	October 22, 2000	——	February 27, 2000	October 22, 2001	**October 20, 2002** (with Chris Benoit)	——
**Eddie Guerrero**	**February 15, 2004**	——	September 4, 2000	July 27, 2003	November 17, 2002 (with Chavo Guerrero Jr.)	——
Edge	**January 8, 2006**	——	July 24, 1999	November 12, 2001	November 5, 2002 (with Rey Mysterio)	
**Big Show**	November 14, 1999	——	**April 1, 2012**	October 19, 2003	July 26, 2009 (with Chris Jericho)	
The Miz (2 times)	November 22, 2010	——	**July 23, 2012**	October 5, 2009	November 16, 2007 (with John Morrison)	January 27, 2019 (with Shane McMahon)
Daniel Bryan	August 18, 2013	——	**March 29, 2015**	September 19, 2010	September 16, 2012 (with Kane)	May 7, 2019 (with Rowan)
**Chris Jericho**	December 9, 2001	——	December 12, 1999	**January 9, 2017**	June 28, 2009 (with Edge)	
Dean Ambrose	June 19, 2016	——	December 13, 2015	May 19, 2013	**August 20, 2017** (with Seth Rollins)	
Roman Reigns	November 22, 2015	August 19, 2018	**November 20, 2017**	September 25, 2016	May 19, 2013 (with Seth Rollins)	
Randy Orton	October 7, 2007	——	December 14, 2003	**March 11, 2018**	August 21, 2021 (with Riddle)	December 4, 2016 (with Bray Wyatt and Luke Harper)
Seth Rollins (2 times)	March 29, 2015	April 7, 2019	**April 8, 2018**	August 23, 2015	May 19, 2013 (with Roman Reigns)	
**Jeff Hardy**	December 14, 2008	——	April 10, 2001	**April 16, 2018**	April 2, 2017 (with Matt Hardy)	April 9, 2019 (with Matt Hardy)
Kofi Kingston	**April 7, 2019**	——	June 29, 2008	June 1, 2009	August 22, 2011 (with Evan Bourne)	July 23, 2017 (with Big E and Xavier Woods)
Rey Mysterio	July 25, 2011	——	April 5, 2009	**May 19, 2019**	November 5, 2002 (with Edge)	May 16, 2021 (with Dominik Mysterio)
AJ Styles	September 11, 2016	——	June 8, 2020	July 7, 2017	**April 10, 2021** (with Omos)	
Kevin Owens		August 29, 2016	September 20, 2015	April 2, 2017	**April 1, 2023** (with Sami Zayn)	
Finn Bálor		August 21, 2016	February 17, 2019	February, 28, 2022	**September 2, 2023** (with Damian Priest)	
John Cena	April 3, 2005	——	**November 10, 2025**	March 14, 2004	October 24, 2010 (with David Otunga)	——
Sami Zayn	**June 27, 2026**	——	March 8, 2020	August 29, 2025	April 1, 2023 (with Kevin Owens)	

==== List of WWE Women's Grand Slam winners ====
In May 2019, Bayley was announced as WWE's first-ever Women's Grand Slam champion, having won the Raw (now WWE Women's Championship), SmackDown (now Women's World Championship), and NXT singles championships, and the WWE Women's Tag Team Championship.

In late 2024/early 2025, WWE introduced two women's secondary titles for the main roster—the WWE Women's United States Championship and WWE Women's Intercontinental Championship. It has not yet been revealed how WWE will handle these in regards to the women's Grand Slam.

As of November 15, 2026, there have been seven individual Women's Grand Slam champions. Rhea Ripley has completed the Grand Slam the fastest, completing it in 1,200 days between December 2019 and April 2023, while Becky Lynch took the longest time to complete the Grand Slam, doing so in 2,257 days between September 2016 and September 2023.

Champion	Singles championships (all three needed)			Tag team championship
Champion	Raw/WWE Women's	SmackDown/ Women's World	NXT Women's	Women's Tag Team
Bayley	February 13, 2017	**May 19, 2019**	August 22, 2015	February 17, 2019 (with Sasha Banks)
Asuka	**April 15, 2020**	December 16, 2018	April 1, 2016	October 6, 2019 (with Kairi Sane)
Sasha Banks	July 25, 2016	**October 25, 2020**	February 11, 2015	February 17, 2019 (with Bayley)
Charlotte Flair	April 3, 2016	November 14, 2017	May 29, 2014	**December 20, 2020** (with Asuka)
Rhea Ripley	April 11, 2021	**April 1, 2023**	December 18, 2019	September 20, 2021 (with Nikki A.S.H.)
Becky Lynch	April 8, 2019	September 11, 2016	**September 12, 2023**	February 27, 2023 (with Lita)
Iyo Sky	August 5, 2023	**March 3, 2025**	June 7, 2020	September 12, 2022 (with Dakota Kai)

==== List of WWE NXT Grand Slam winners ====
On April 4, 2026, at Stand & Deliver, Tony D'Angelo won the NXT Championship and became the first-ever NXT Grand Slam champion, having previously won the NXT North American Championship, NXT Tag Team Championship, and NXT Heritage Cup. However, with the Heritage Cup being retired, the closest former Heritage Cup winner who can pursue Grand Slam is Channing "Stacks" Lorenzo, as he needs both the NXT Championship and North American Championship.

Champion	Primary championship	Secondary championship	Tag team championship	Tertiary championship
Champion	NXT	North American	Tag Team	Heritage Cup
Tony D'Angelo	**April 4, 2026**	October 8, 2024	July 30, 2023 (with Channing "Stacks" Lorenzo)	May 14, 2024

=== TNA Wrestling (2009) ===
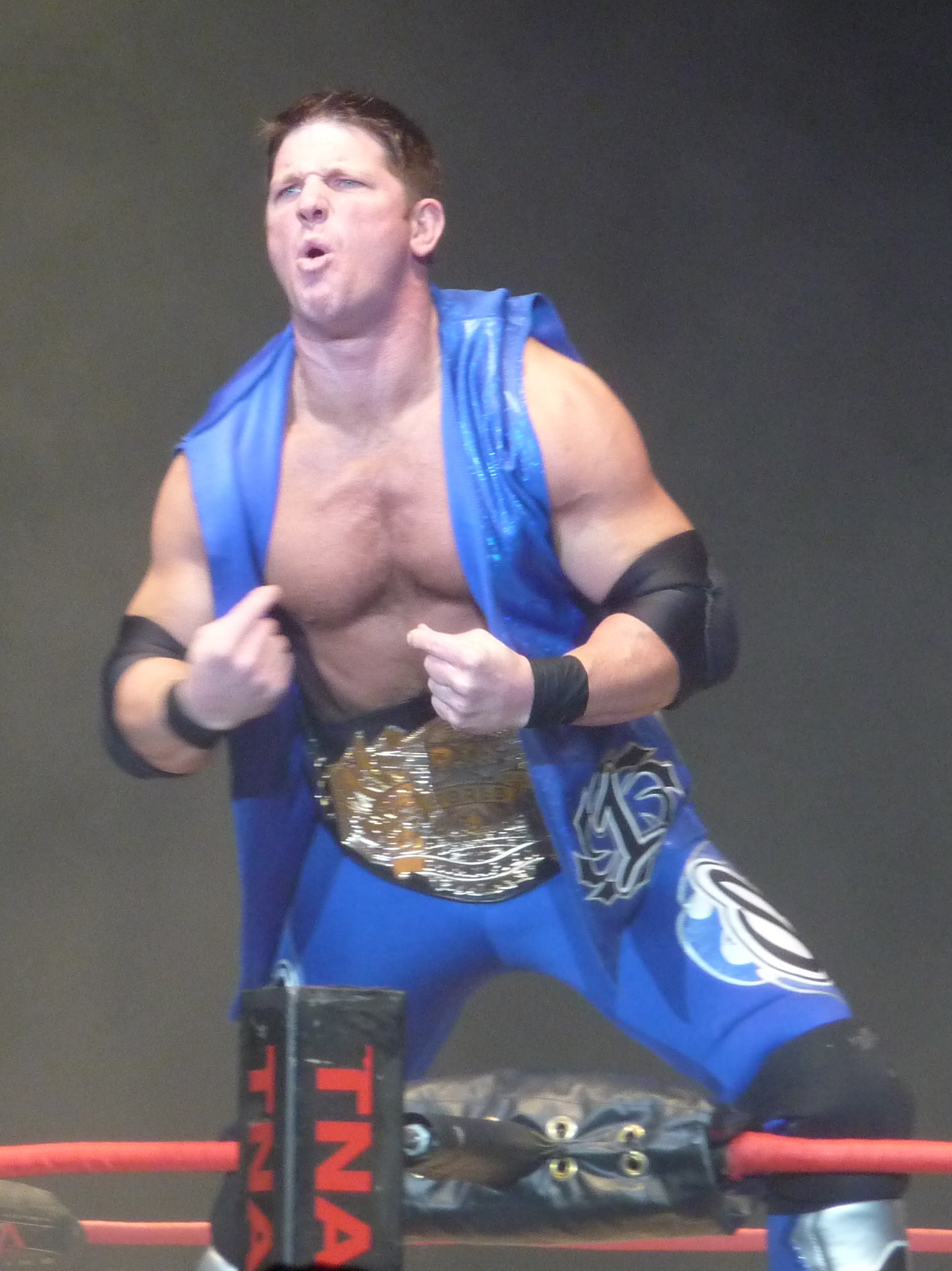
A.J. Styles – the first TNA Grand Slam winner and the only man to be a Grand Slam Champion in both TNA and WWE

The first Total Nonstop Action Wrestling (TNA - known as Impact Wrestling from 2017–2023) Grand Slam winner was crowned on March 15, 2009, at TNA's Destination X pay-per-view event. At said event, then three-time TNA Triple Crown champion A.J. Styles defeated Booker T for the TNA Legends Championship. On the March 19 episode of TNA's primary television program, TNA Impact!, announcer Mike Tenay stated that Styles had become the first TNA Grand Slam winner by capturing the World Heavyweight (NWA or TNA), World Tag Team (NWA or TNA), X Division, and Legends Championships (The Legends Championship was subsequently renamed the Global, Television, and King of the Mountain Championship, before being fully retired).

Under TNA's definition of the Grand Slam, wrestlers are eligible to be a multiple Grand Slam winner each time they complete a new circuit. Thus far, only A.J. Styles has won the Grand Slam on more than one occasion. On August 15, 2016, the TNA King of the Mountain Championship was once again retired when Lashley unified the title into his TNA World Heavyweight Championship. In an article from March 26, 2018, on the Impact Wrestling website, the eligibility of the Impact Grand Championship, which replaced the King of the Mountain Championship, as a Grand Slam title was confirmed. During a press conference on June 4, 2018, Austin Aries unified the Impact Grand Championship with the Impact World Title. The eligibility of the TNA International Championship was confirmed as a Grand Slam title after Frankie Kazarian won the TNA World Title in late 2025, with him previously holding the X Division, International, and Tag Team Titles.

==== List of TNA Grand Slam winners ====
Text
Dates in **bold**	The date the wrestler completed the Grand Slam
Dates in italics	The wrestler has won that title, but it does not contribute to their Grand Slam because they had already won the Grand Slam or they had already won a title at that same level
Indicates future reigns are impossible due to the title being discontinued or no longer under Impact’s control

Champion	Primary championships (either needed)		Secondary championship	Tag team championships (either needed)		Tertiary championships (one needed)		
Champion	NWA World Heavyweight	TNA/Impact World (Heavyweight)	X Division	NWA World Tag Team	TNA/Impact World Tag Team	Legends/Global/TV/KOTM	Grand	International
AJ Styles	June 11, 2003	September 20, 2009	June 19, 2002	July 3, 2002 (with Jerry Lynn)	October 14, 2007 (with Tomko)	**March 15, 2009**	——	
Abyss	November 19, 2006		**May 16, 2011**	February 4, 2004 (with A.J. Styles)	September 19, 2014 (with James Storm)	January 9, 2011	——	
Samoa Joe	——	April 13, 2008	December 11, 2005	——	July 15, 2007 (with no partner)	**September 27, 2012**	——	
Eric Young	——	**April 10, 2014**	December 7, 2008	October 12, 2004 (with Bobby Roode)	April 15, 2008 (with Kaz)	October 18, 2009	——	
Austin Aries	——	July 8, 2012	September 11, 2011	——	January 25, 2013 (with Bobby Roode)	——	**January 14, 2018**	
Frankie Kazarian	——	**November 13, 2025**	March 31, 2004	——	April 15, 2008 (with Eric Young)	——	——	September 26, 2025

=== Ring of Honor (2018) ===
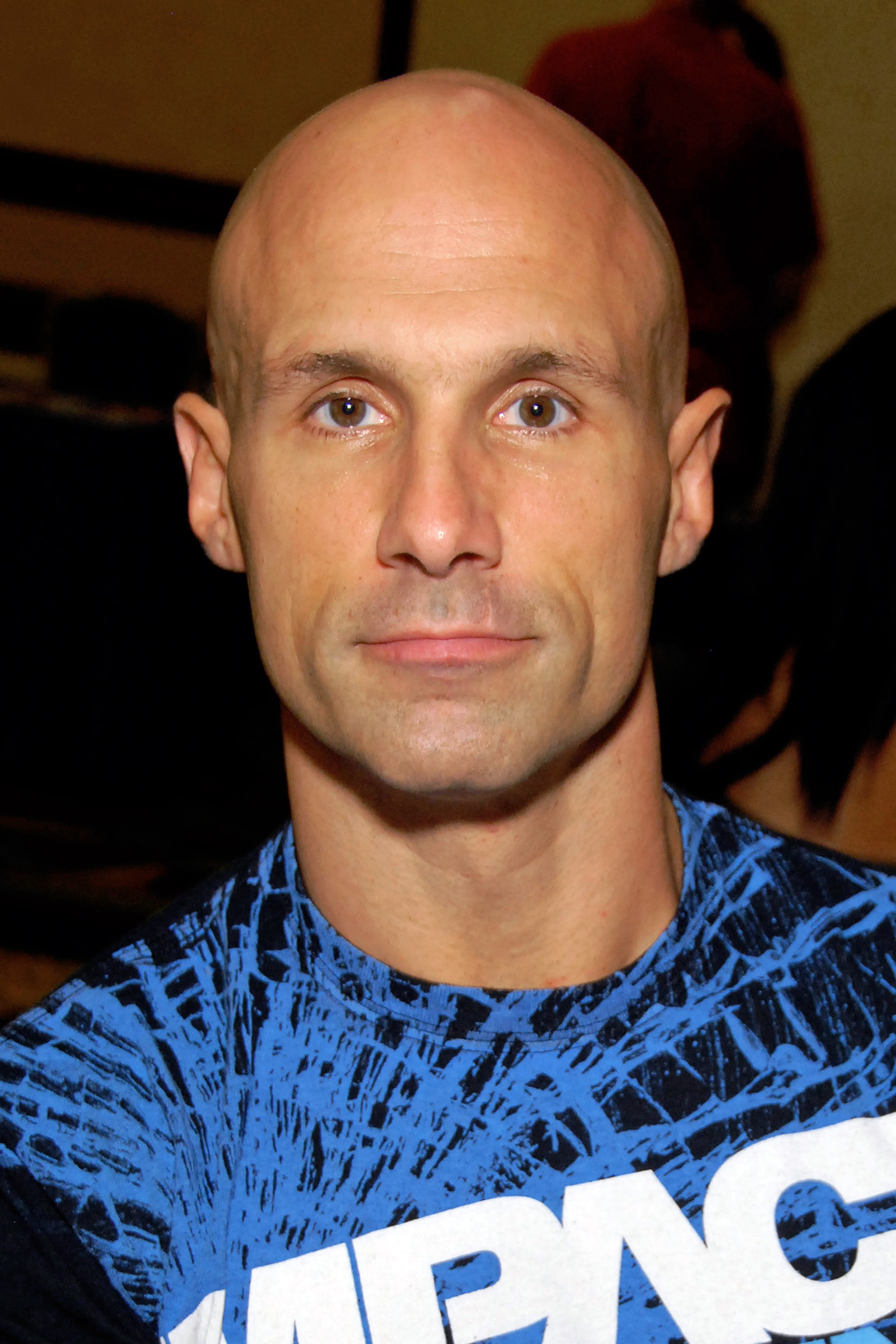
Inaugural ROH Grand Slam winner Christopher Daniels

In 2018, Ring of Honor (ROH) established its own version of the Grand Slam, which consists of the ROH World Championship, ROH World Television Championship, ROH World Tag Team Championship, and ROH World Six-Man Tag Team Championship. Christopher Daniels was the first wrestler to achieve this feat, doing so at the ROH 16th Anniversary Show, when he won the Six-Man titles to complete the Grand Slam. After Jay Lethal won the ROH World Tag Team Championship, he was announced as a Grand Slam Champion since he had won the ROH Pure Championship in the past, indicating that the Pure and Six-Man Tag Team Titles are interchangeable as the fourth component to the ROH Grand Slam.

==== List of ROH Grand Slam winners ====
Text
Dates in **bold**	The date the wrestler completed the Grand Slam
Colors
	Won all Grand Slam eligible titles

Champion	Primary championship	Secondary championship	Tag team championship	Tertiary championships (either needed)	
Champion	World	World Television	World Tag Team	Pure	World Six-Man Tag Team
Christopher Daniels	March 10, 2017	December 10, 2010	September 21, 2002 (with Donovan Morgan)		**March 9, 2018** (with Frankie Kazarian and Scorpio Sky)
Matt Taven	**April 6, 2019**	March 2, 2013	September 18, 2015 (with Michael Bennett)		December 2, 2016 (with T. K. O'Ryan and Vinny Marseglia)
Jay Lethal	June 19, 2015	August 13, 2011	**December 13, 2019** (with Jonathan Gresham)	March 5, 2005	August 21, 2026 (with Blake Christian and Lee Johnson)

=== All Elite Wrestling (2025) ===
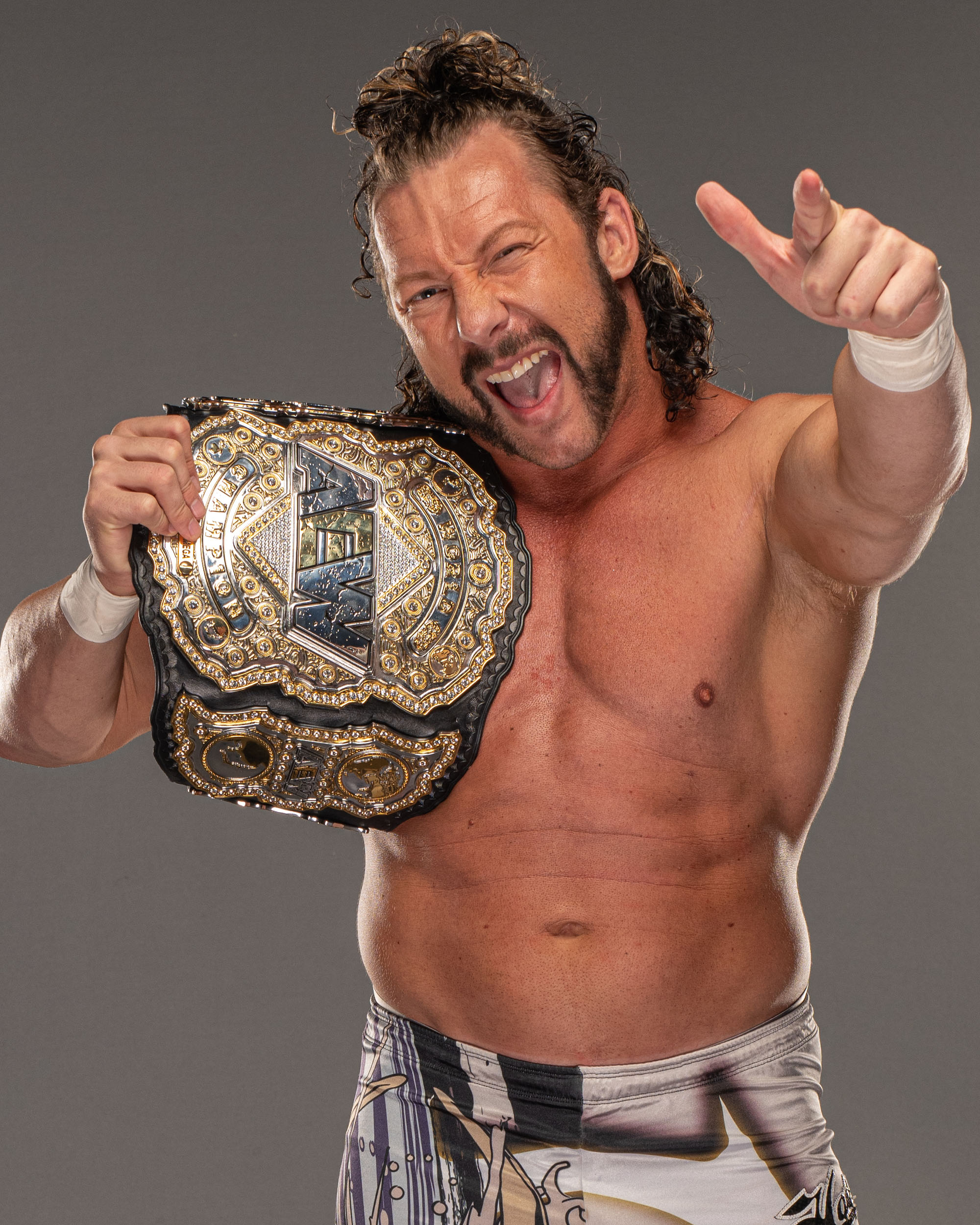
Kenny Omega, AEW's first Grand Slam winner

In All Elite Wrestling (AEW), Kenny Omega became recognized as the company's first-ever Grand Slam Champion upon winning the AEW International Championship at Revolution on March 9, 2025, after having previously won the AEW World Championship (pictured with Omega), the AEW World Tag Team Championship, and the AEW World Trios Championship two times—the titles that compose AEW's Triple Crown of which Omega was also the first to achieve.

==== List of AEW Grand Slam winners ====
Text
Dates in **bold**	The date the wrestler completed the Grand Slam

Champion	Primary championship	Secondary championship	Tag team championship	Trios championship
Champion	World	International	World Tag Team	World Trios
Kenny Omega	December 2, 2020	**March 9, 2025**	January 21, 2020 (with Adam Page)	September 4, 2022 (with Matt Jackson and Nick Jackson)

== U.S. regional/independent promotions ==
=== Florida Championship Wrestling (2012) ===
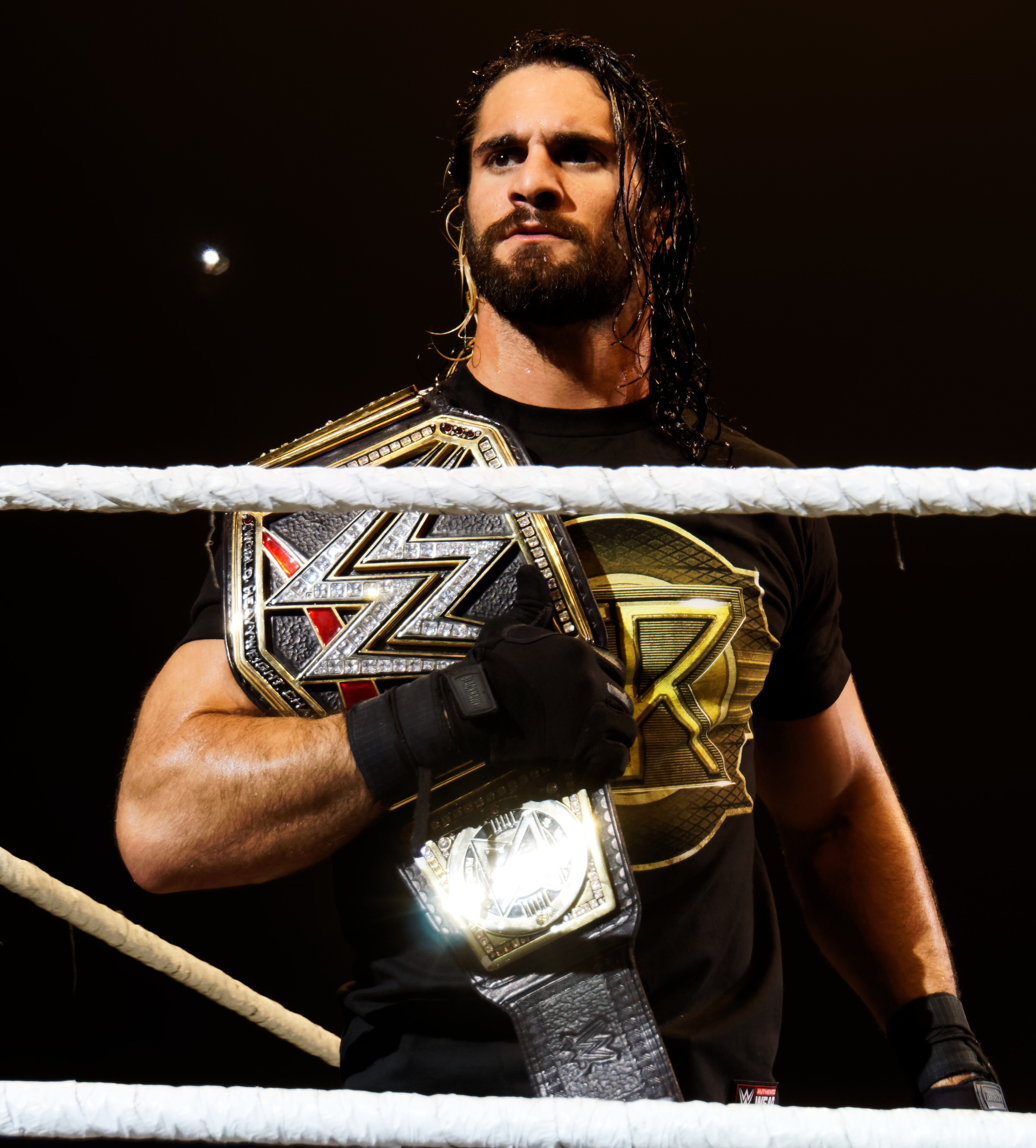
Seth Rollins is the only wrestler to complete both the FCW and WWE Grand Slam.

In Florida Championship Wrestling (FCW), WWE's former developmental territory, a Grand Slam winner was a wrestler who had won every championship that was available in FCW. All FCW titles were retired when FCW changed its name to NXT.

==== List of FCW Grand Slam winners ====
Text
Dates in **bold**	The date the wrestler completed the Grand Slam

Champion	Primary championship	Secondary championship	Tag team championship
Champion	Florida Heavyweight	FCW Jack Brisco 15 Championship	Florida Tag Team
Seth Rollins	**February 23, 2012**	January 13, 2011	March 25, 2011 (with Richie Steamboat)
Richie Steamboat	**July 25, 2012**	January 13, 2012	March 25, 2011 (with Seth Rollins)

== Japan ==
=== New Japan Pro-Wrestling (2021) ===
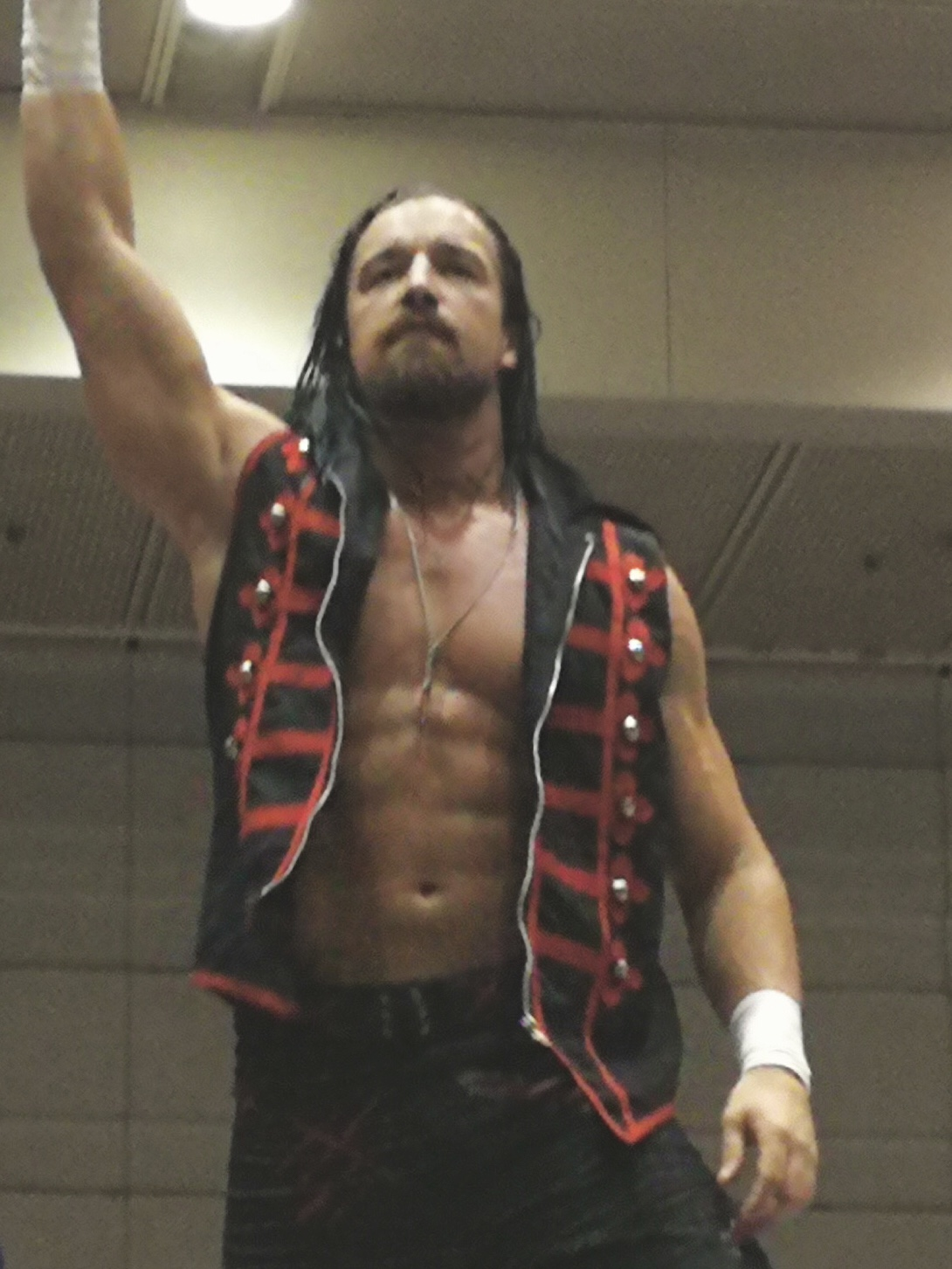
Inaugural NJPW Grand Slam winner Jay White

In 2021, New Japan Pro-Wrestling retroactively established its own version of the Grand Slam, occasionally also referred to as the Quadruple Crown, consisting of the IWGP Heavyweight Championship, the IWGP United States Heavyweight Championship, the IWGP Intercontinental Championship and the NEVER Openweight Championship. The NJPW Grand Slam is unique in Grand Slams as it consists of four singles championships. Jay White was the first to achieve this feat, completing the circuit on May 3, 2021, at Wrestling Dontaku 2021. It is currently unknown if another NJPW Grand Slam will be established, as the IWGP Intercontinental Championship was retired in 2026, and the United States Championship in 2023 in favor of the IWGP Global Heavyweight Championship.

==== List of NJPW Grand Slam winners ====
Text
Dates in **bold**	The date the wrestler completed the Grand Slam

Champion	Primary championship	Secondary championships (both needed)		Tertiary championship
Champion	IWGP Heavyweight	IWGP Intercontinental	IWGP United States Heavyweight	NEVER Openweight
Jay White	February 11, 2019	September 22, 2019	January 28, 2018	**May 3, 2021**
Hiroshi Tanahashi	July 17, 2006	January 4, 2014	**August 14, 2021**	January 30, 2021
Will Ospreay	April 4, 2021	April 4, 2021	**June 12, 2022**	January 4, 2019

=== Ice Ribbon (2012) ===
In the joshi puroresu (women's professional wrestling) promotion Ice Ribbon, the Grand Slam consists of the ICE×60/ICE×∞ Championship, the International Ribbon Tag Team Championship, the Triangle Ribbon Championship and the IW19 Championship.

==== List of Ice Ribbon Grand Slam winners ====
Text
Dates in **bold**	The date the wrestler completed the Grand Slam

Champion	Primary championship	Secondary championship	Tag team championship	Tertiary championship
Champion	ICE×∞	Triangle Ribbon	International Ribbon Tag Team	IW19
Tsukasa Fujimoto	January 4, 2010	December 11, 2010	December 23, 2010 (with Hikaru Shida)	**June 1, 2012**
Hikari Minami	July 19, 2010	July 26, 2026	**August 30, 2026** (with Manami Katsu)	May 27, 2011

=== Tokyo Joshi Pro Wrestling (2023–present) ===
In TJPW, the Grand Slam consists of all the available titles promoted by the company. They are the Princess of Princess Championship, the Princess Tag Team Championship, and the International Princess Championship. On March 18, 2023, during the Grand Princess event, Rika Tatsumi became the first Grand Slam champion in TJPW's history.

==== List of Tokyo Joshi Pro Wrestling Grand Slam winners ====
Text
Dates in **bold**	The date the wrestler completed the Grand Slam

Champion	Primary championship	Secondary championship	Tag team championship
Champion	Princess of Princess Championship	International Princess Championship	Princess Tag Team Championship
Rika Tatsumi	January 4, 2021	**March 18, 2023**	November 3, 2019 (with Miu Watanabe)
Miu Watanabe	**March 31, 2024**	October 9, 2022	November 3, 2019 (with Rika Tatsumi)
Yuki Arai	**March 29, 2026**	January 4, 2024	July 9, 2022 (with Saki Akai)

=== World Wonder Ring Stardom (2022–present) ===
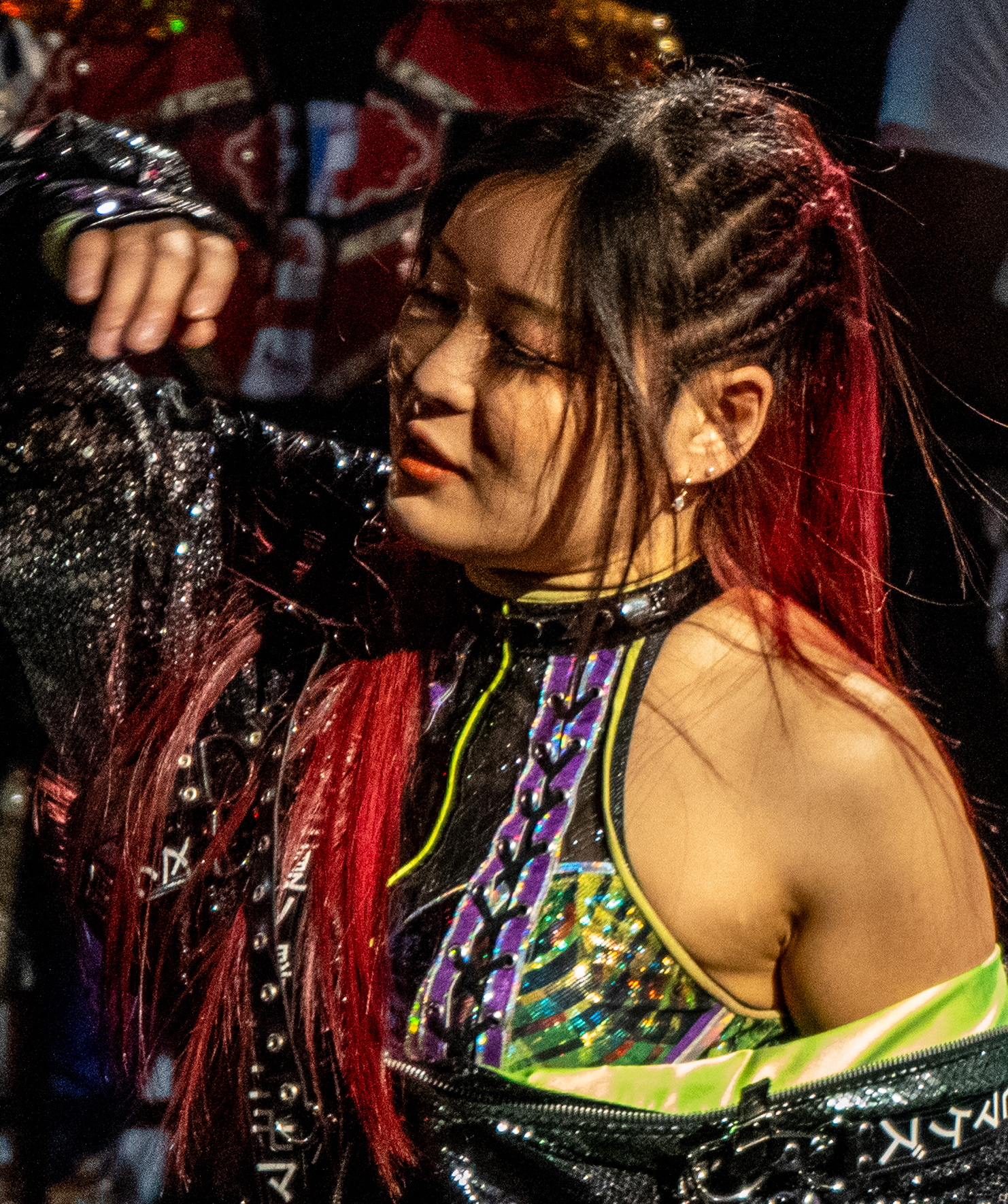
Inaugural Stardom Grand Slam winner Io Shirai.

In the joshi puroresu (women's professional wrestling) promotion World Wonder Ring Stardom, the Grand Slam consists of all the available titles promoted by the company (except for the rookie-exclusive Future of Stardom Championship and New Blood Tag Team Championship). They are the World of Stardom Championship, the Wonder of Stardom Championship, the Goddesses of Stardom Championship, the Artist of Stardom Championship and the High Speed Championship. The SWA World Championship was also originally part of this lineup, but it was deactivated in 2022. The notion of "grand slam" was first officially mentioned on May 5, 2022, when Mayu Iwatani became the second wrestler in the company to achieve the feat, after Io Shirai.

In early 2026, Starlight Kid unequivocally stated that winning the World of Stardom Championship would complete the Grand Slam for her, despite having never so much as competed for the SWA World Championship during its existence. Thus signalling its removal as a necessity. Furthermore, she specified that it would constitute a "true/complete Grand Slam" (Note: Japanese: 真のグランドスラム／完全なグランドスラム, Hepburn: shin no gurandosuramu/kanzen na gurandosuramu), as – on top of the regular constituents – she had also previously held the Future and New Blood titles. Akin to the "Super Slam" concept in other sports (most closely resembling that of figure skating).

==== List of World Wonder Ring Stardom Grand Slam winners ====
Text
Dates in **bold**	The date the wrestler completed the Grand Slam

Champion	Primary championships		Tag team championships		Junior division championship	Tertiary championship (defunct)
Champion	World of Stardom Championship	Wonder of Stardom Championship	Goddesses of Stardom Championship	Artist of Stardom Championship	High Speed Championship	SWA World Championship
Io Shirai	April 29, 2013	May 17, 2015	May 6, 2015 (with Mayu Iwatani)	December 7, 2014 (with Mayu Iwatani and Takumi Iroha)	May 6, 2014	**May 21, 2016**
Mayu Iwatani	June 21, 2017	July 27, 2014	May 6, 2015 (with Io Shirai)	December 29, 2013 (with Hiroyo Matsumoto and Miho Wakizawa)	October 11, 2015	**May 5, 2022**

== See also ==
- Championship unification – Combining two or more professional wrestling championships into a single championship
- Triple Crown (professional wrestling)
- Undisputed championship (professional wrestling) – Unquestioned top title in a promotion
