= Slammiversary XVI =

2018 Impact Wrestling pay-per-view event

- Promotional poster featuring various Impact wrestlers
- Promotion: Impact Wrestling
- Date: July 22, 2018
- City: Toronto, Ontario, Canada
- Venue: The Rebel Complex
- Attendance: 3,700

Pay-per-view chronology
← Previous; Redemption	Next → Bound for Glory

Slammiversary chronology
← Previous; XV	Next → XVII

Slammiversary XVI was a professional wrestling pay-per-view (PPV) event produced by Impact Wrestling. The event took place on July 22, 2018, at The Rebel Complex in Toronto, Ontario, Canada. It was the fourteenth event under the Slammiversary chronology.

Eight professional wrestling matches were contested at the event and were broadcast live on pay-per-view. The main event saw Impact World Champion Austin Aries successfully defended his title against Moose. The undercard also featured acclaimed matches such The Latin American Xchange retaining the Impact World Tag Team Championship by defeating The OGz in a 5150 Street Fight, and Pentagón Jr. defeating Sami Callihan in a Mask vs. Hair match. The event received universal acclaim from fans and critics.

== Storylines ==
The event featured professional wrestling matches that involved different wrestlers from pre-existing scripted feuds and storylines. Wrestlers portrayed villains, heroes, or less distinguishable characters in the scripted events that built tension and culminated in a wrestling match or series of matches.

At Redemption, Impact Wrestling announced the date for Slammiversary XVI. At the June 4 Slammiversary press conference, two title matches were announced for the event.

== Event ==
Other on-screen personnel
Commentator	Josh Mathews
Commentator	Don Callis
Ring announcer	Jeffery Scott
Referee	Brandon Tolle
Referee	John E. Bravo
Referee	Kris Levin
Referee	Harry Demerjian
Interviewers	Alicia Atout

The pay-per-view opened with Fenix, Johnny Impact, Petey Williams and Taiji Ishimori in a Fatal 4-way match. Impact performed a Starship Pain on Fenix to win the match. Rich Swann was scheduled to participate in this match, but due to a concussion that he suffered during a match in MLW, he was replaced by Williams.

Next, Allie faced Tessa Blanchard. In the end, Blanchard performed a hammerlock DDT on Allie to win the match.

After that, Eddie Edwards faced Tommy Dreamer in a House of Hardcore rules match. Edwards won after he performed a Boston Knee Party on a chair into Dreamer's face. After the match, Dreamer offer Edwards his hand. Edwards' accepted the handshake after his wife, Alisha Edwards, arrived at ringside. Dreamer gave a kendo stick to Edwards. Alisha Edwards and Dreamer left, while Edwards stayed in the ring.

Later, Matt Sydal defended the Impact X Division Championship against Brian Cage. He failed to do so, as Cage performed a Drill Claw on Sydal to win the title.

In the fifth match, Su Yung defended the Impact Knockout Championship against Madison Rayne. Yung applied the Mandible Claw until Rayne fainted to retain the title. After the match, Yung put Rayne inside a coffin.

Next, The Latin American Xchange (Santana and Ortiz) accompanied by Konnan defended the Impact World Tag Team Championship against The OGz (Hernandez and Homicide), who were accompanied by King, in a 5150 Street Fight. Santana performed a Frog Splash on Homicide who were laying on thumbtacks to retain the title.

After that, Pentagon Jr. defeated Sami Callihan in a Mask vs. Hair match, when Pentagon performed a package piledriver to win the match. After the match, Pentagon shaved Callihan's hair with a razor on the ramp, while Fenix held Callihan's arms.

In the main event, Austin Aries defended the Impact World Championship against Moose. Toronto Blue Jays outfielder Curtis Granderson served referee's duties for the pre-match (where the championship belt is displayed by the referee before the start) events. Aries performed a brainbuster to retain the title.

== Reception ==
Slammiversary received widespread critical acclaim. Nolan Howell of Slam Wrestling declared that "Impact Wrestling made a statement here with what could be the best show of the year, at least in American wrestling". Howell's best-rated match was the Impact World Tag Team Championship match at 4.5 out of 5 stars, noting that "it really captured some of the old LAX feel, with great brawling and hardcore spots that really took the blood feud atmosphere up a notch". He rated the main event 4.25 stars out of 5, noting that it "was going to be hard for this to top the rest of the card, but it delivered and then some with Aries continuing his run as one of the top heels in the game. Moose delivered on his end as well with some great big man offense and demonstrating an ability to go beyond that with his bumping."

Mike McMahon of the Pro Wrestling Torch Newsletter rated the Mask vs. Hair match 4.75 stars, describing the match as "very hardcore", and that "it's different from anything else you'll see on a mainstream wrestling level in the U.S." He declared the match as one of his "favorite matches all year so far, across any promotion". He rated the four-way match 4.5 stars, noting that Johnny Impact is "a guy that, if booked the right way, Impact can build around". He also rated the Impact World Tag Team Championship match 4.5 stars, while noting that while he's "OK with just one hardcore match on a show", both Edwards-Dreamer and LAX-OGz "had culminated and called for a more aggressive match". He also observed that the two matches were different, as "LAX vs. OGz was a lot more athletic with more big moves, while Dreamer and Edwards relied on more weapons".

The writer of the Slammiversary report on 411 Mania, Larry Csonka, rated the event an 8.5 out of 10 which was higher than last year's event that was given 7.2 out of 10. Csonka stated that Slammiversary "was a rather great show with a lot of great wrestling to love, and a PPV show that felt, for the first time in a long time, they really gave the talent a chance to go out, do their thing and succeed. This was a tremendously enjoyable show, with nothing at all BAD, and the roster stepping up big time and simply delivering. It's amazing that when you allow the talent to really do their thing and have a hot crowd that good things happen."

Jason Powell from Pro Wrestling Dot Net praised the event as being a "very good effort from Impact Wrestling". He felt that the opening match was "the type of crazy and fun four-way one would expect from these guys", the Impact World Tag Team Championship match as a "crazy brawl that the broadcast team and production had a hard time keeping up with". Powell praised the Mask vs. Hair match, while noting that it "was really good for what it was, but it would have been terrific in the culmination of a long blood feud". Of the Impact World Championship match, Powell said that it was a "good main event with hard work from both men and a crowd that surprisingly didn't lose much momentum despite the Pentagon vs. Callihan semi main event being so insane".

Dave Meltzer's Wrestling Observer Newsletter rated the Mask vs. Hair match and the Impact World Championship match as the best of the show at 4.25 out of 5 stars, and the four-way match and the Impact World Tag Team Championship match 3.75 stars. The worst rated match was the Impact Knockouts Championship match at 1.5 stars.

== Results ==
No.	Results	Stipulations	Times
1	Johnny Impact defeated Fenix, Taiji Ishimori and Petey Williams	Four-way match	12:30
2	Tessa Blanchard defeated Allie	Singles match	11:00
3	Eddie Edwards defeated Tommy Dreamer	House of Hardcore Rules match	11:10
4	Brian Cage defeated Matt Sydal (c)	Singles match for the Impact X Division Championship	9:45
5	Su Yung (c) defeated Madison Rayne	Singles match for the Impact Knockouts Championship	6:50
6	Latin American Xchange (Santana and Ortiz) (with Konnan) (c) defeated The OGz (Hernandez and Homicide) (with King)	5150 Street Fight for the Impact World Tag Team Championship	13:40
7	Pentagón Jr. (mask) defeated Sami Callihan (hair)	Mask vs. Hair match	18:15
8	Austin Aries (c) defeated Moose	Singles match for the Impact World Championship	15:50
(c) / – the champion(s) heading into the match

== See also ==
- 2018 in professional wrestling
- Professional wrestling in Canada
- List of Impact Wrestling pay-per-view events
