= Moose (wrestler) =

American professional wrestler and football player (born 1984)

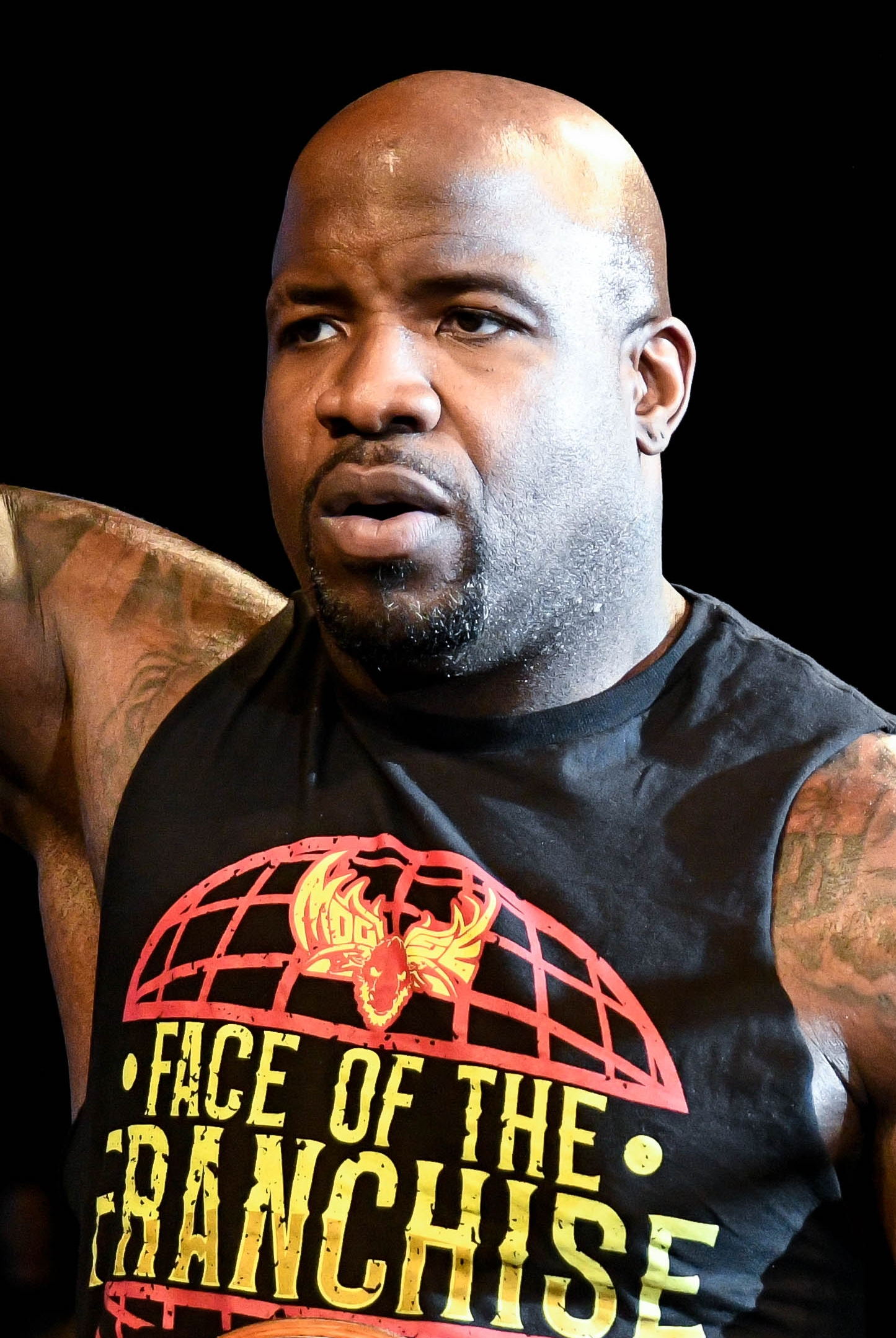
- Moose in 2025
- Born: Quinn Ojinnaka; April 23, 1984 (age 42); Seabrook, Maryland, U.S.
- Education: Syracuse University
- Professional wrestling career
- Ring name(s): Moose; Moose Ojinnaka; Quinn Ojinnaka
- Billed height: 6 ft 5 in (1.96 m)
- Billed weight: 299 lb (136 kg)
- Billed from: Atlanta, Georgia; Orlando, Florida
- Trained by: Curtis Hughes; ROH Wrestling Academy; Scott D'Amore
- Debut: February 23, 2012
- Football career
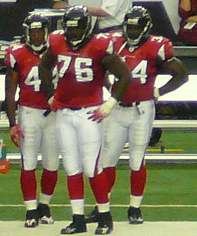
- Ojinnaka (center) with Jason Snelling and Ovie Mughelli in 2009

No. 76, 69
- Position: Offensive tackle / guard

Personal information
- Listed height: 6 ft 5 in (1.96 m)
- Listed weight: 295 lb (134 kg)

Career information
- High school: DeMatha Catholic (Hyattsville, Maryland)
- College: Syracuse
- NFL draft: 2006: 5th round, 139th overall pick

Career history
- Atlanta Falcons (2006–2009); New England Patriots (2010); St. Louis Rams (2011)*; Indianapolis Colts (2011); St. Louis Rams (2012)
- * Offseason or practice squad member only

Career NFL statistics
- Games played: 62
- Games started: 20
- Stats at Pro Football Reference

Quinn Ojinnaka // (born April 23, 1984), better known by his ring name Moose, is an American professional wrestler and former professional football player. He is signed to Total Nonstop Action Wrestling (TNA).

He has also worked for Ring of Honor (ROH), New Japan Pro-Wrestling (NJPW), Pro Wrestling Noah, Evolve Wrestling, and Revolution Pro Wrestling (RPW). In 2016, Moose signed with Total Nonstop Action Wrestling (TNA) which would later be known as Impact Wrestling. Moose would go on to become a two-time Impact Grand Champion, one-time TNA World Heavyweight Champion (2020–2021), one-time TNA X Division Champion, and two-time TNA World Champion.

As an offensive lineman, Ojinnaka played college football for the Syracuse Orange and was drafted by the Atlanta Falcons in the fifth round of the 2006 NFL draft. He went on to play for the New England Patriots, St. Louis Rams, and Indianapolis Colts.

== Early life ==
Quinn Ojinnaka was born on April 23, 1984, the son of Pete Ojinnaka and Rebecca Ojinnaka. Born in Seabrook, Maryland. He attended DeMatha Catholic High School in Hyattsville, Maryland, where he earned All-Prince George’s County offensive lineman honors as a senior when his team had an 11–0 season that included the Washington Catholic Athletic Conference championship.

== College career ==
Ojinnaka attended Syracuse, where he played in 44 games with 23 starts in four years. In 2005, he started 2 games as a junior. He was part of an offensive line that blocked for the first Syracuse duo to each run for 800 yards (Damien Rhodes and Walter Reyes) since 1979. The team allowed 199 sacks, the second-most in the Big East Conference. In 2006, Ojinnaka played in the 2006 Las Vegas All-American Classic for the East squad after starting all 11 games as a senior.

== Professional football career ==
Pre-draft measurables
Height	Weight	Arm length	Hand span	40-yard dash	10-yard split	20-yard split	20-yard shuttle	Three-cone drill	Vertical jump	Broad jump	Bench press
6 ft 4 5/8 in (1.95 m)	309 lb (140 kg)	34 in (0.86 m)	9 5/8 in (0.24 m)	5.45 s	1.83 s	3.10 s	4.84 s	7.90 s	29.5 in (0.75 m)	9 ft 1 in (2.77 m)	21 reps
All values from NFL Combine/Pro Day

=== Atlanta Falcons ===
Ojinnaka was selected in the fifth round (139th overall) of the 2006 NFL draft by the Atlanta Falcons. As a rookie in 2006, he played in 11 games. He saw playing time on special teams in Weeks 1–4 and 8–13. He played on the offensive line for the first time in his professional career when he replaced Wayne Gandy who had been injured against the Tampa Bay Buccaneers.

In 2007, Ojinnaka played in 11 games, and had seven starts at left tackle. His first career NFL start at left tackle was against the San Francisco 49ers. He played in eight games in 2008. In 2009, he played in nine games, and started the final five games at right guard in place of an injured Harvey Dahl.

=== New England Patriots ===
On August 23, 2010, Ojinnaka was traded to the New England Patriots for a seventh round pick in the 2011 NFL draft. After serving his one-game suspension in Week 1, Ojinnaka was inactive for the team's next two games. He was released on September 30, 2010. The Patriots re-signed Ojinnaka on October 7, 2010. In total, he was active for eight games in 2010, all as a reserve.

=== St. Louis Rams (first stint) ===
Ojinnaka signed with the St. Louis Rams on August 6, 2011. He was released on September 3.

=== Indianapolis Colts ===
The Indianapolis Colts signed Ojinnaka on October 5, 2011.

=== St. Louis Rams (second stint) ===
Ojinnaka signed with the Rams on March 22, 2012. He was waived on September 2, 2012.

He was re-signed on September 12, 2012, when Scott Wells injured his foot and Robert Turner moved from left guard to center. However, he was released again on October 22, 2012.

== Professional wrestling career ==
=== Early career (2012–2014) ===
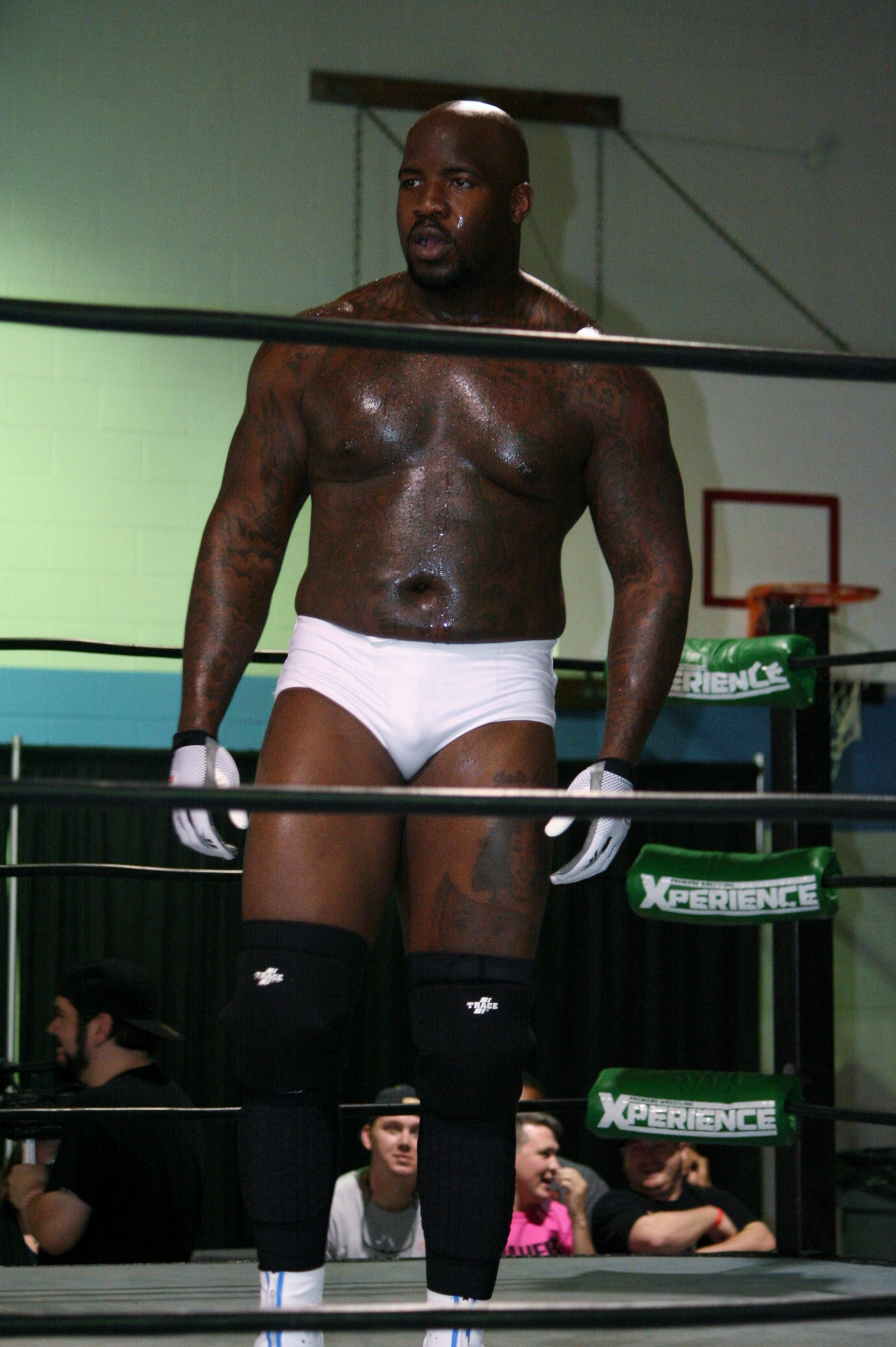
Moose in 2014.

Ojinnaka started his professional wrestling training in 2012 under Mr. Hughes at WWA4, and attended WWE training camps. On February 22, 2014, he made his debut for Dragon Gate USA, working alongside the Bravado Brothers in a bodyguard role. On May 6, 2015, Global Force Wrestling (GFW) announced Ojinnaka as part of their roster. Because he was signed to a Ring of Honor (ROH) contract, Ojinnaka only worked GFW's house shows and not television tapings.

=== Ring of Honor (2014–2016) ===
After Ojinnaka appeared at ROH's Best in the World 2014 event on June 22, 2014, and the promotion announced two days later that it had signed him to a contract. Ojinnaka then adopted the ring name Moose and formed a partnership with R.D. Evans and Veda Scott. On December 7, 2014, at Final Battle 2014, Moose, accompanied by Prince Nana and Stokely Hathaway, defeated R.D. Evans. On March 1, 2015, at the ROH 13th Anniversary Show, Moose defeated Mark Briscoe in a singles match, marking his first major win within Ring of Honor. Moose beforehand "squashed" wrestlers, such as Colby Corino. Moose's undefeated streak ended on May 16 at Global Wars '15, when he was defeated by Cedric Alexander. On June 19 at Best in the World '15, Moose's manager Veda Scott turned on him and formed a new partnership with Alexander. At the PPV, Moose lost a three-way match against Roderick Strong. At Final Battle, he lost against Michael Elgin. At Best in the World '16, Moose teamed with War Machine but lost against Bullet Club. Ojinnaka left ROH on July 8, 2016, with reports linking him to both WWE and Total Nonstop Action Wrestling (TNA).

=== New Japan Pro-Wrestling (2015–2016, 2021) ===
From 2015 to 2016, through ROH's relationship with New Japan Pro-Wrestling (NJPW), Moose sporadically wrestled for NJPW. On August 3, 2021, Moose was announced for Resurgence, as part of a partnership between Impact and NJPW. At Resurgence on August 14, Moose lost to Tomohiro Ishii. On November 13, at Battle in the Valley, he defeated Juice Robinson.

=== Total Nonstop Action Wrestling/Impact Wrestling ===
==== Impact Grand Champion (2016–2017) ====
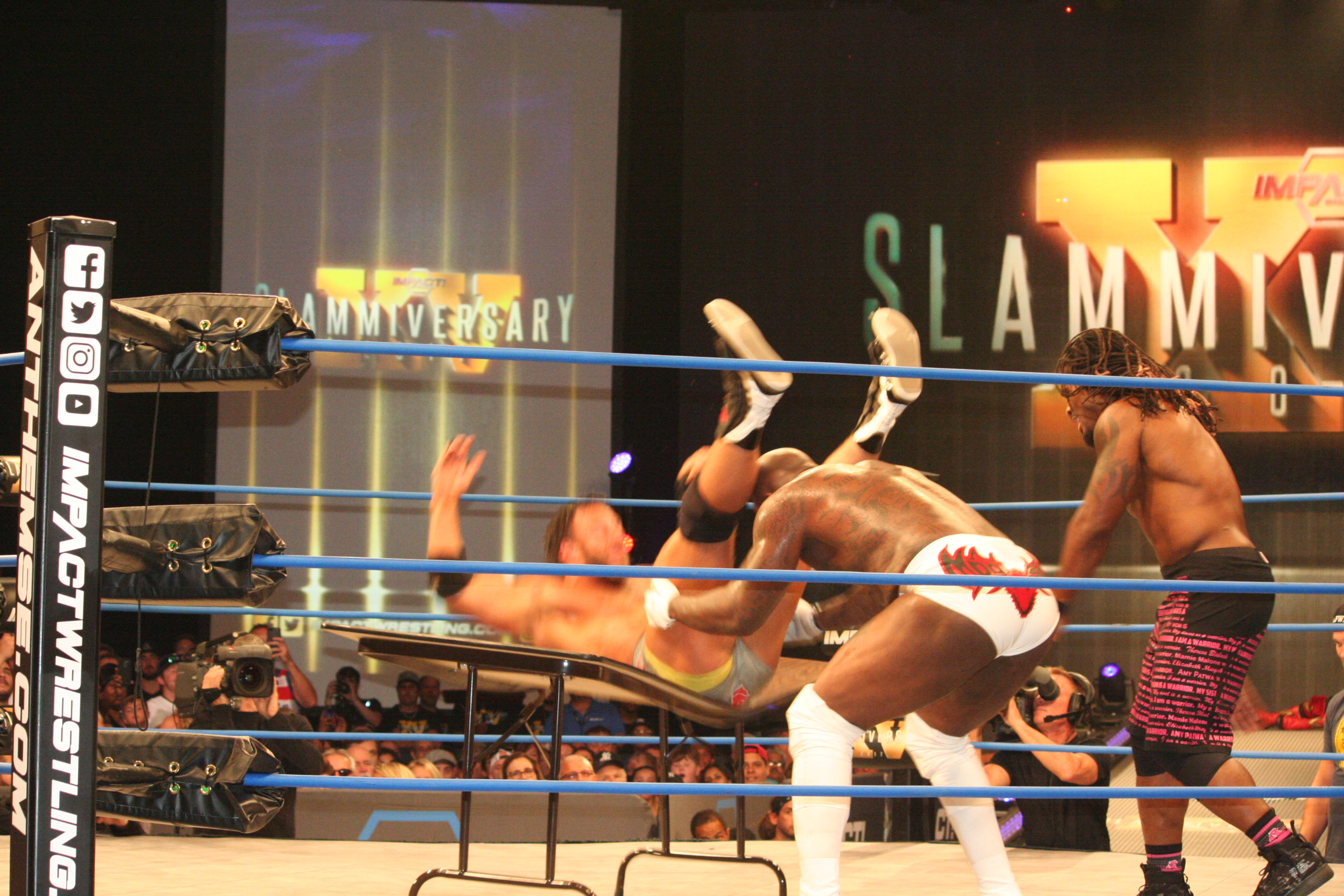
Moose teamed up with DeAngelo Williams to wrestle Eli Drake and Chris Adonis at Slammiversary XV.

Moose made his TNA debut on the July 12, 2016, Destination X edition of Impact Wrestling, interrupting the main event match between TNA World Heavyweight Champion Bobby Lashley and TNA X Division Champion Eddie Edwards, aligning himself with Mike Bennett and Maria, establishing himself as a heel. Ojinnaka reportedly had signed a two-year exclusive deal with the promotion. On the July 28 episode of Impact Wrestling, Moose made his in-ring debut, defeating indy wrestler David Starr. On the August 11 episode of Impact Wrestling, Moose and Bennett defeated Eddie Edwards and Ethan Carter III. On the August 19 episode of Impact Wrestling, Moose defeated Edwards.

On the August 25 episode of Impact Wrestling, Moose participated in a battle royal to determine the number one contender to the TNA World Heavyweight Championship but was eliminated by Mike Bennett. The following week, Moose refused to help Bennett during his World Heavyweight Championship match against Lashley and attacked him after the match, dissolving their partnership and turning face in the process. On October 2, Moose defeated Bennett at Bound for Glory. On the October 13 episode of Impact Wrestling, he defeated Ethan Carter III for having a match against Lashley to determine the number one contender to the TNA World Heavyweight Championship. However, on the October 20 episode of Impact Wrestling, Moose was defeated by Lashley. On the November 10 episode of Impact Wrestling, Moose lost to Bennett by countout, thus not qualified for the four-way match the following week to determine another new contender number one for the TNA World Heavyweight Championship.

On December 1 episode of Impact Wrestling, Moose answered Aron Rex's Open Challenge and defeated him for the Impact Grand Championship. Moose successfully retained his title against Rex in a rematch the following week. After the match, he had a confrontation against the returning Drew Galloway. On the January 5, 2017 episode of Impact Wrestling, he successfully retained his title against Mike Bennett by decision. After the match, Moose was challenged by Bennett for a No Disqualification match at One Night Only: Live!, which he won once again. On January 19, Moose lost the Impact Grand Championship to Galloway. At Genesis, Moose was defeated by Galloway in a rematch and failed to regain the title. On the February 9 episode of Impact Wrestling, Moose saved Cody's wife Brandi Rhodes from an attack by Rosemary and Decay. The following week, Moose and Brandi defeated Abyss and Crazzy Steve. On the March 23 episode of Impact Wrestling, Cody thanked Moose for helping Brandi Rhodes while he was away. However, after learning Brandi had Moose's phone number, Cody attacked Moose. On the March 2 episode of Impact Wrestling, Moose was attacked by Cody and brawled with him, resulting in Cody running away from Moose. The same night, Moose defeated Galloway to regain the Impact Grand Championship. On the March 30 episode of Impact Wrestling, Moose retained his title against Cody.

After successfully defending the Impact Grand Championship against Randy Reign at Border City Wrestling, Moose was attacked by Chris Adonis. At Turning Point, Moose challenged Lashley for the Impact World Heavyweight Championship, but was defeated. On the April 27 episode of Impact Wrestling, Moose defended his title against Davey Richards but the match ended in a no-contest. After the match, DeAngelo Williams and Gary Barnidge, who were on Moose's side during the match, attacked Richard. On the May 30 episode of Impact Wrestling, Moose challenged Lashley for the Impact World Heavyweight Championship once again, but was ultimately defeated. On the June 1 episode of Impact Wrestling, Moose retained his title against Eli Drake. After being challenged for a tag-team match at Slammiversary XV by Adonis and Drake, Moose revealed his tag-team partner on the June 22 episode of Impact Wrestling, who was DeAngelo Williams. At the event, Moose and Williams defeated Adonis and Drake. On the July 13 episode of Impact Wrestling, Moose retained his title against Naomichi Marufuji when the match ended in a no-contest, after an attack by Ethan Carter III. On the August 3 episode of Impact Wrestling, Moose lost the Impact Grand Championship to Carter.

==== Championship pursuits and various feuds (2017–2020) ====
On the August 24 episode of Impact Wrestling, Moose was involved in the 20-man gauntlet match for the vacated GFW Global Championship which was won by Eli Drake. On the September 14 episode of Impact Wrestling, Lashley called Moose during his last Impact Wrestling night and the two brawled against each other on the Impact Zone. However, Moose was attacked by Lashley's MMA team, the American Top Team, with the help of Dan Lambert. On the October 12 episode of Impact Wrestling, Moose reveals that his partner against Lashley and the American Top Team will be Stephan Bonnar. Then, the duo vandalized the ATT Dojo and stole many of Dan Lambert's belts and trophies. Two weeks later, Moose defeated Lashley by disqualification after being attacked by Lambert. At Bound for Glory, Moose and Stephan Bonnar were defeated by Lashley and King Mo in a Six Sides of Steel match. On the November 16 episode of Impact Wrestling, Moose was saved by James Storm during a beatdown of the American Top Team. Then, on the December 7 episode of Impact Wrestling, Moose and James Storm were defeated by Lashley and Dan Lambert. The following month, Moose, teaming with Eddie Edwards, was defeated by Lashley and KM. However, during the Impact special episode Genesis, Moose defeated Lashley. After the match, Lashley turned face and both him and Moose attacked Dan Lambert and an American Top Team member. After the beatdown, Moose and Lashley shook each other's hands, thus ending the rivalry.

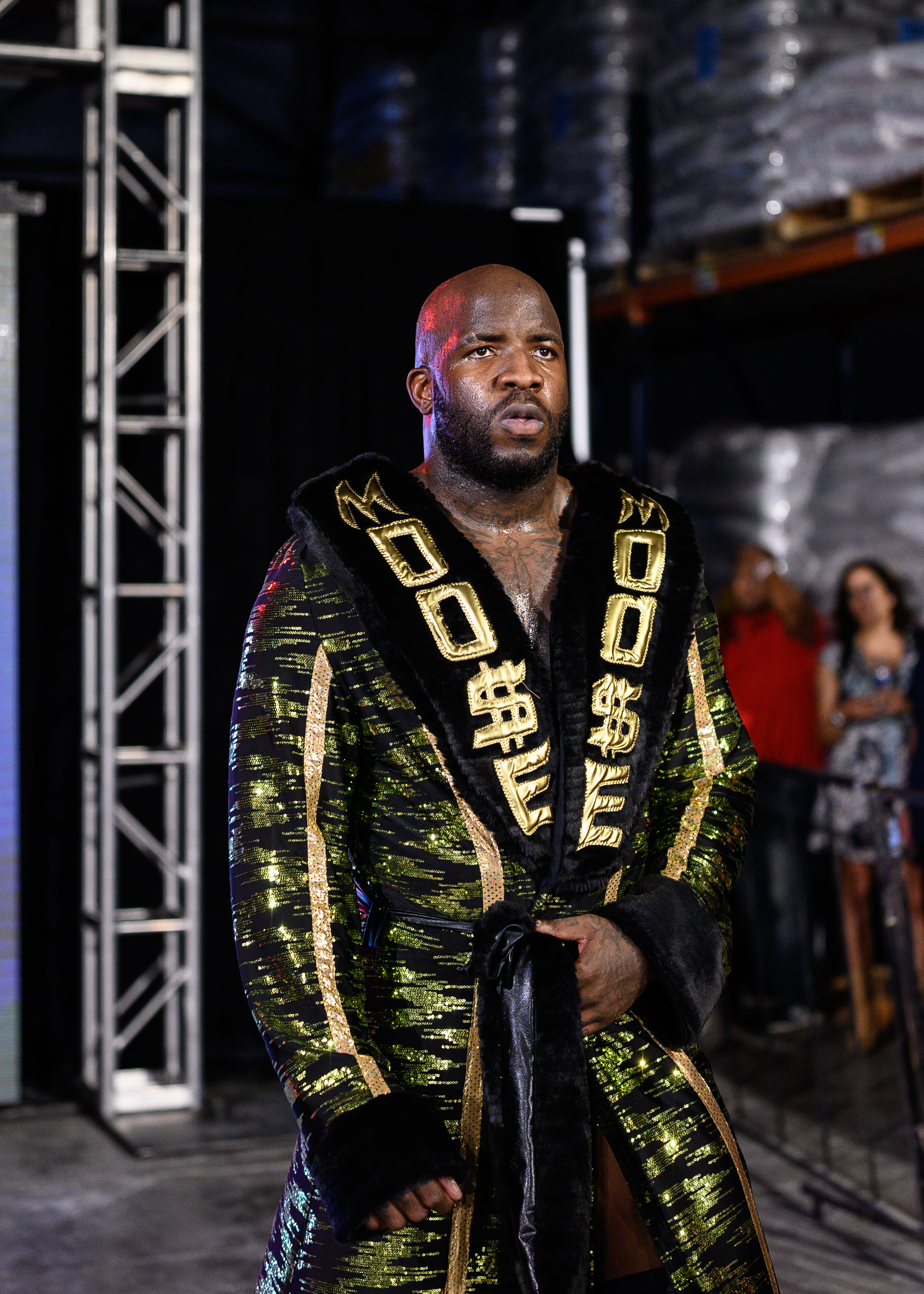
Moose in 2019.

On the February 1 episode of Impact Wrestling, Moose and Johnny Impact defeated Ethan Carter III and Alberto El Patron. The following week, Moose participated in a four-way match including the three wrestlers to determine the number one contender for the Impact World Championship, which was won by Johnny Impact. On the March 15 episode of Impact, Moose participated at the Feast or Fired match, which he grabbed a briefcase. The following week, Moose revealed that his briefcase contained a World Championship contract. However, on the April 5 episode of Impact, Moose was defeated by Eli Drake after an intervention by Ohio Versus Everything in a case (World Championship) vs. case (Tag Team Championship) match, and lost his World Championship contract. The following week, Moose defeated Sami Callihan. At Redemption, Moose, Eddie Edwards and Tommy Dreamer were defeated by OVE in a House of Hardcore match. After the PPV, Moose went to a series of victories, defeating Braxton Sutter on the April 26 episode of Impact, and Kongo Kong the following month.

On the June 7 episode of Impact Wrestling, Moose was ranked No. 1 of the Top 5 Impact Wrestling Dummies of Eli Drake. Then, he confronted Drake and challenged him for a match, before being attacked and humiliated. The following week at House of Hardcore 43, Moose defeated Drake and became the number one contender for the Impact World Championship at Slammiversary XVI against Austin Aries. At Slammiversary, Moose lost to Aries.

On August 12 (which aired on tape delay on August 30) at Impact! ReDefined, Moose and Edwards were scheduled for a match with Aries and his ally Killer Kross. Having apparently been attacked by Kross backstage, Moose would make his way ringside in bandages, but upon being tagged in, Moose instead attacked Edwards with a spear, revealing a ruse and thus aligning himself with Aries and Kross, turning heel in the process. Moose and Edwards would feud throughout the rest of 2018 with Killer Kross and Tommy Dreamer also getting involved in their feud. Their final clash happened at Homecoming in a street fight where Eddie won. After quietly dissolving his partnership with Kross (Aries left the company after dropping his title to Johnny Impact at Bound for Glory), Moose would move into a feud with The Rascalz (Trey Miguel, Zachary Wentz and Dezmond Xavier).

Over the course of the feud, Moose would form an alliance with The North (Ethan Page and Josh Alexander), with the trio defeating The Rascalz at Rebellion. Moose and The North would then enter a storyline with the returning Rob Van Dam and Sabu, with Tommy Dreamer assisting his ECW partners. Moose then defeated Van Dam at Slammiversary XVII. On October 20, 2019, at Bound for Glory, Moose defeated Ken Shamrock.

==== Self proclaimed TNA World Heavyweight Champion (2020–2021) ====
On April 28, 2020, at Rebellion Night 2, Moose appeared with the old TNA World Heavyweight Championship title (in its 2011–2017 design) and declared himself the new TNA World Champion after defeating Hernandez and Michael Elgin. Moose made his first "title defense" on the May 12 edition of Impact!, defeating Suicide. He continued to defend it unofficially against the likes of Hernandez, Suicide twice, and Crazzy Steve. At the time, Impact Wrestling did not officially recognize Moose's TNA World Heavyweight Championship reign as an official title reign on either its web site or during the weekly broadcasts of Impact. At Slammiversary, Moose defeated Tommy Dreamer in an Old School Rules match, retaining the title. On the August 18 episode of Impact, Moose was attacked by a returning EC3, stealing his belt. This led to a match between the two at Bound for Glory, which Moose won.

On the February 23, 2021, episode of Impact!, after a post match beatdown of Jake Something from Moose, Scott D'Amore made Moose's TNA Championship a "sanctioned" title. Later that night, Moose made his first official title defense defeating Something in the show's main event. In that episode, it was also announced Moose would get his long desired Impact World Championship match against Rich Swann at Sacrifice. At the event, Moose failed to capture the title. At Under Siege, Moose won a six-way match also featuring Sami Callihan, Chris Sabin, Chris Bey, Trey Miguel, and Matt Cardona to earn a shot at the Impact World Championship, which was then held by Kenny Omega. On the June 10, 2021 episode of Impact!, it was announced by decision of D'Amore and AEW president Tony Khan that Moose's match against Omega would take place at Daily's Place in Jacksonville, Florida, making Callihan and the Good Brothers unable to interfere as they were scheduled for an earlier match held at the Impact Zone in Nashville. However, Moose was unsuccessful after an interference of The Young Bucks. At Slammiversary, Moose was defeated by Chris Sabin.

==== Impact World Champion (2021–2023) ====
In September, Moose would form an alliance with W. Morrissey as the two started a feud with Eddie Edwards. The feud would hit its climax at Victory Road as Moose and Morrissey defeated Edwards and Sami Callihan, and during the post match assault, the duo attacked Edwards' wife Alisha as well, thus extending the feud. At Bound for Glory, Moose won the Call Your Shot Gauntlet match, thus earning a shot at any championship. Later that night, he cashed in his Call Your Shot, defeating newly crowned Impact World Champion Josh Alexander to win the title for the first time. On November 20 at Turning Point, Moose made his first successful title defense against Edwards in a Full Metal Mayhem match. At the start of 2022, he went on to retain the title against Matt Cardona and W. Morrissey at Hard To Kill, against Morrissey at No Surrender, and against Heath at Sacrifice.

After successfully retaining the title against Heath, Moose was attacked by a returning Josh Alexander, who announced that he had signed both a new multi-year Impact Wrestling contract, and a contract to face Moose for his World title in the main event of Rebellion. On April 1, 2022, at Multiverse of Matches, Moose teamed with Honor No More's PCO to take on Alexander and Jonah in a losing effort. At Rebellion, Moose lost the Impact World Championship to Alexander, ending his reign at 182 days. Two weeks later, at Under Siege, Moose attempted to hijack the show but was attacked by a returning Sami Callihan. This led to a Monster's Ball match at Slammiversary, where Moose lost. The feud continued at Against All Odds, with Moose winning a Clockwork Orange House of Fun match after Steve Maclin attacked Callihan. On the August 18 episode of Impact!, Moose competed in a six-way elimination match to determine the number one contender to the Impact World Championship, which was won by Eddie Edwards. At Victory Road, he competed in a three-way Barbed Wire Massacre won by Maclin that also involved Callihan. On October 7 at Bound for Glory, Moose participated in the Call Your Shot Gauntlet, eliminating four people before being eliminated by Maclin. On November 18, at Over Drive, Moose lost to Bully Ray in a tables match.

On the December 1 episode of Impact!, Moose started a feud with Joe Hendry over the Impact Digital Media Championship. On January 13, 2023, at Hard To Kill, Moose defeated Hendry for the title after a low blow, but the match was restarted by new Director of Authority Santino Marella, where Hendry retained the title. On February 24, at No Surrender, Moose fought Hendry for the title in a Dot Combat match, but failed to win. On March 30, at Multiverse United, Moose lost against Jeff Cobb. On April 16, at Rebellion, Moose fought for Team Bully and lost a 10-wrestler Hardcore War against Team Dreamer. On June 9 at Against All Odds, Moose competed in the 8-4-1 match to determine the number one contender for the Impact World Championship, which was won by Nick Aldis. On July 15 at Slammiversary, Myers and Moose was involved in the Impact World Tag Team Championship four-way tag team match, which was won by Subculture (Mark Andrews and Flash Morgan Webster). On September 14, 2023, at Impact 1000, Moose competed in a Feast or Fired match where he got a case. The following week, Moose revealed that his briefcase contained a World Championship contract. At Bound for Glory on October 21, Moose competed in a Monster's Ball match which was won by PCO. Backstage at the same event, Moose stated that he would cash-in his Feast or Fired contract and challenge for the Impact World Championship at Hard to Kill.

==== The System (2024–2026) ====
During the "Countdown to Hard to Kill" pre-show, Moose appeared alongside DeAngelo Williams, Eddie Edwards, Brian Myers and Alisha Edwards, calling themselves "The System". On the main card, Moose defeated Alex Shelley to win the newly renamed TNA World Championship. After the match, Moose was confronted by Nic Nemeth. On February 23 at No Surrender, Moose successfully defended his title against Shelley in a No Surrender Rules match. On March 8 at Sacrifice, Moose successfully defended his title against Eric Young. On April 20 at Rebellion, Moose successfully defended his title against Nic Nemeth. After the match, Moose was attacked by a returning Matt Hardy. On May 3 at Under Siege, The System defeated Hardy and Speedball Mountain (Trent Seven and Mike Bailey). On June 14 at Against All Odds, Moose successfully defended his title against Matt Hardy in a Broken Rules match. On July 20 at Slammiversary, Moose lost the TNA World Championship in six-way elimination match to Nic Nemeth, he was eliminated second by Joe Hendry, ending his second reign at 189 days. At Emergence the following month, after The System had competed in an eight-man tag team match, Moose called out Nemeth for his contractual rematch. At the event on September 13, Moose failed to win the TNA World Championship from Nemeth. At Bound for Glory on October 6, Moose was defeated by Mike Santana. On the November 7 episode of Impact!, Moose defeated "Speedball" Mike Bailey to win the TNA X Division Championship for the first time. At Turning Point, Moose would successfully defend his title against Laredo Kid. At Final Resolution, Moose would defeat Kushida to retain his X Division Title.

Moose would begin a feud with Ace Austin, after Moose confronted Austin and insulting Austin's partner, Chris Bey. At Genesis, Moose would successfully defend his X Division Title against Austin. On March 14 at Sacrifice, Moose successfully defended the X Division Championship against Jeff Hardy in a ladder match. On April 27 at Rebellion, he defeated KC Navarro, Leon Slater, Matt Cardona, El Hijo del Vikingo, and Sidney Akeem in an Ultimate X match. On July 20 at Slammiversary, Moose lost the title to Leon Slater, ending his reign at 266 days, but post-match endorsed Slater and turned face for the first time since 2018. On August 20 at Emergence, Moose failed to defeat NXT wrestler Trick Williams for the TNA World Championship.

On the January 22, 2026 episode of Impact!, Moose and JDC were both kicked out of The System, and were replaced by Bear Bronson and Cedric Alexander.

==== Singles competition (2026–present) ====
After being kicked out of the System, Moose remained aligned with Alisha Edwards who defected from the stable due to their actions, and would go on to defeat Cedric Alexander, Brian Myers, and Bear Bronson in back-to-back-to-back matches. On March 27 at Sacrifice, Moose defeated Eddie Edwards by disqualifaction after he was attacked by Special Agent 0 of the Order 4. On April 11 at Rebellion, Moose was defeated by Special Agent 0 after he was distracted due to Alisha seemingly suffering an injury. During the main event world title match between Mike Santana and Eddie Edwards, Moose made an appearance and showed a video of Alisha lying about her injury and that she was working in secret with The System.

=== WWE (2025–present) ===
Moose made his surprise WWE debut on the February 18, 2025 episode of NXT facing off the NXT Champion Oba Femi while teasing a match between the two down the line, also having a confrontation later on with the NXT Heritage Cup Champion Lexis King agreeing to defend his TNA X-Division Championship against him on the next week's episode. On the February 25 episode, he successfully defended his championship against King. After the match, Femi challenged Moose to a match for the former's NXT Championship at Roadblock. At the event on March 11, Moose failed to win the title from Femi. On the September 23 episode of NXT, Moose, along with other wrestlers of the TNA roster, took part in a major storyline, where they invaded NXT and brawled with various wrestlers on the NXT roster.

== Personal life ==
Ojinnaka is of Nigerian Igbo descent. On May 29, 2009, he was arrested for domestic battery in Gwinnett County, Georgia, after he allegedly struck and spat at his wife during an argument over a female friend of his on Facebook, according to a police report. He told police that his wife had tried to stab him with a pen, and she said he threw her on some stairs before tossing her out of the house. He was later suspended by the NFL for the first game of the 2010 regular season. Ojinnaka's wife divorced him after he announced his intention to leave the NFL and become a professional wrestler.

== Championships and accomplishments ==
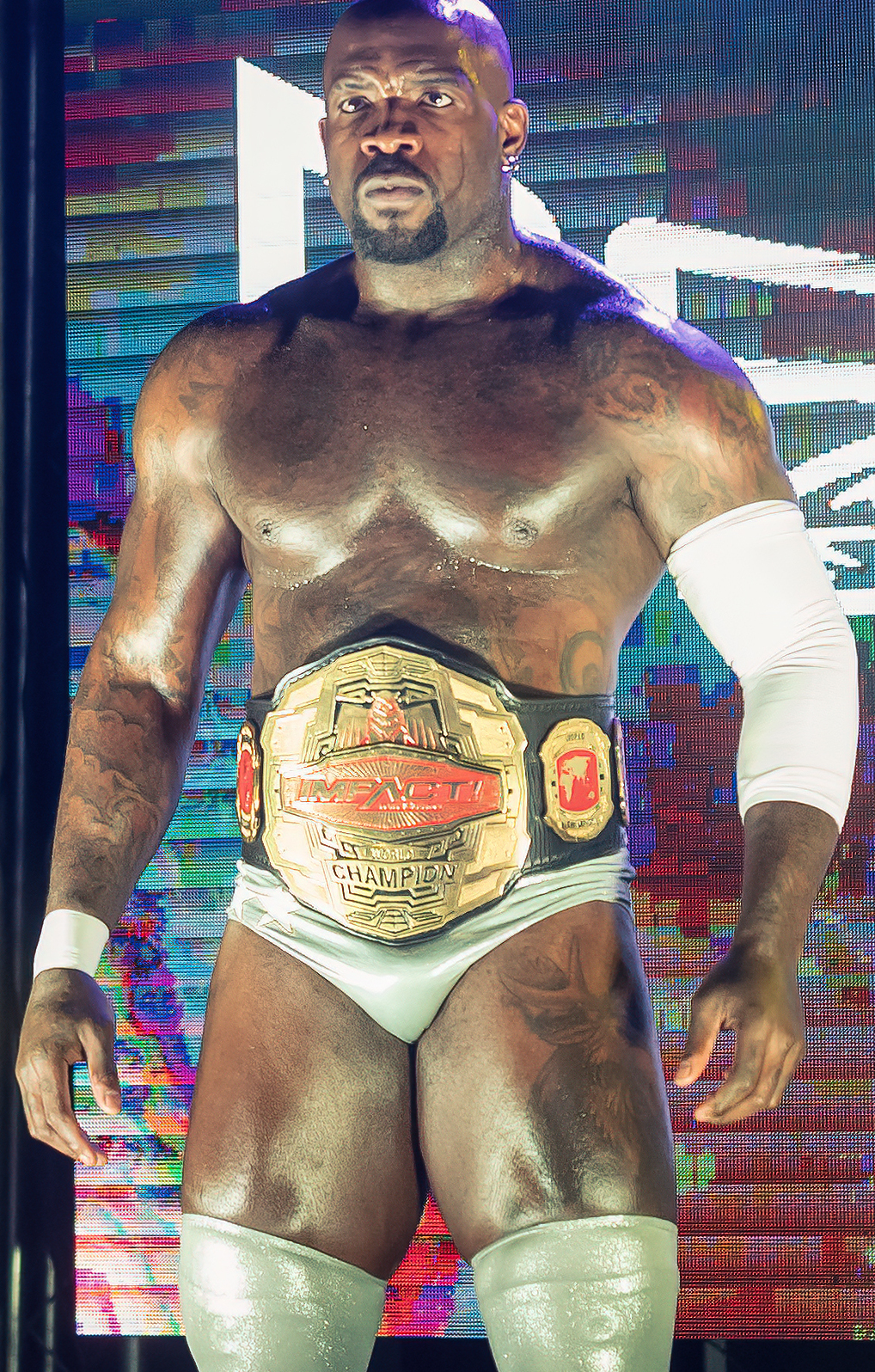
Moose is a two-time TNA World Champion...

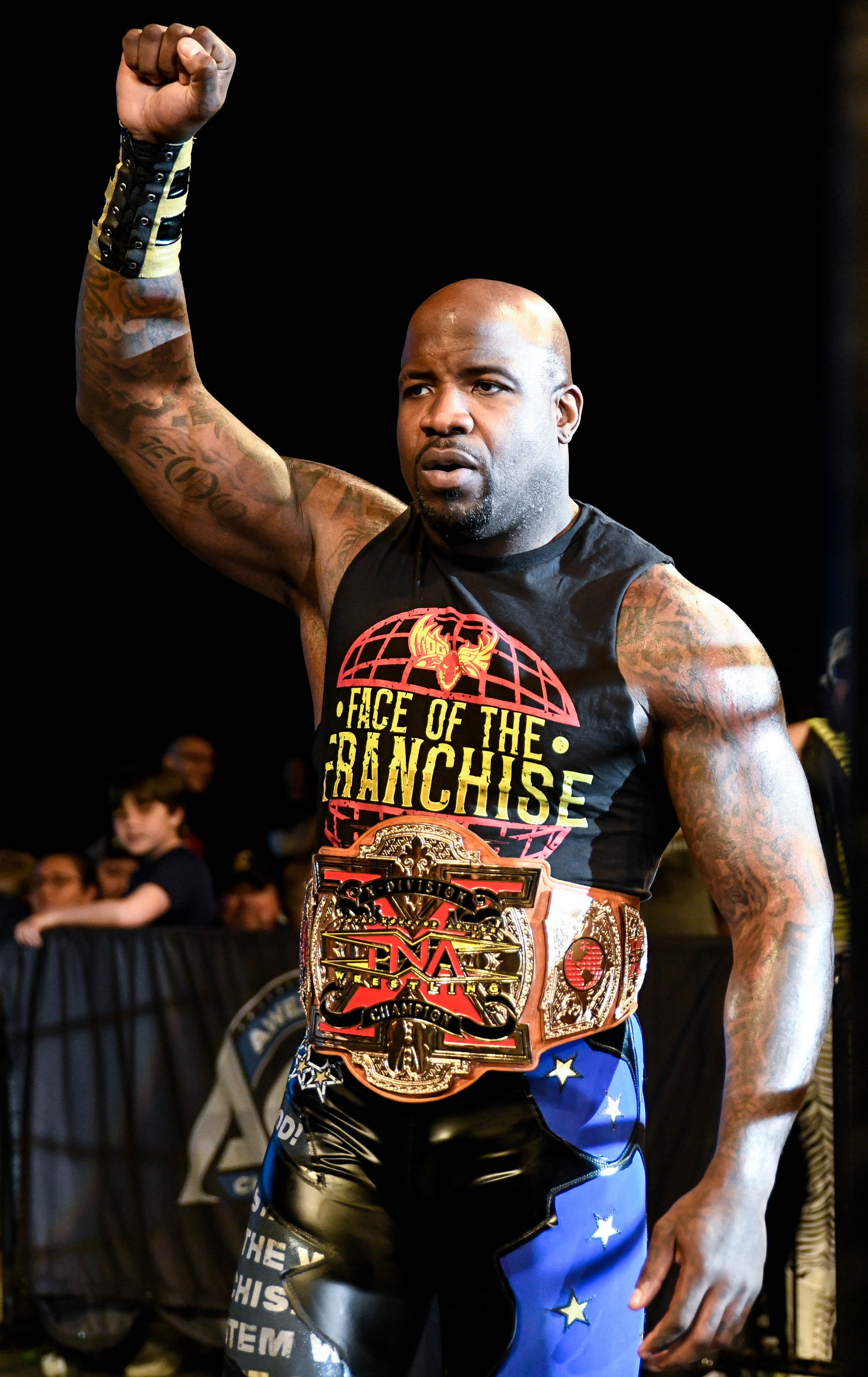
...and a former one-time TNA X Division Champion.

- German Wrestling Federation
  - GWF Heavyweight Championship (1 time)
- I Believe in Wrestling
  - SCW Florida Heavyweight Championship (1 time)
- International Pro Wrestling: United Kingdom
  - IPW:UK World Championship (1 time)
- Noble Champions Group
  - NCG Sovereign States Championship (1 time)
- Pro Wrestling 2.0
  - PW2.0 Heavyweight Championship (1 time)
- Pro Wrestling Illustrated
  - Rookie of the Year (2015)
  - Ranked No. 15 of the top 500 singles wrestlers in the PWI 500 in 2024
- Premiere Wrestling Xperience
  - PWX Innovative Television Championship (1 time)
- Sans Restriction
  - Sans Restriction Heritage Championship (1 time)
- Southern Wrestling Association
  - SWA Tag Team Championship (1 time) – with A. R. Fox
  - Rhymer Cup (2015) – with A. R. Fox
- Total Nonstop Action Wrestling/Impact Wrestling
  - TNA/Impact World Championship (2 times)
  - TNA World Heavyweight Championship (1 time, inaugural)
  - TNA X Division Championship (1 time)
  - Impact Grand Championship (2 times)
  - TNA Year End Awards (1 time)
    - Faction of the Year (2025) as The System
  - Call Your Shot Gauntlet (2021)
  - Feast or Fired (2018, 2023 – World Championship contract)
  - TNA Joker's Wild (2017)
- VIP Wrestling
  - VIP Heavyweight Championship (1 time)
- World Series Wrestling
  - WSW Australian Championship (1 time, current)

== See also ==
- List of gridiron football players who became professional wrestlers
- List of multi-sport athletes
- List of Nigerian Americans
