= Impact Grand Championship =

Former professional wrestling championship

Details
- Promotion: Impact Wrestling
- Date established: October 2, 2016
- Date retired: June 4, 2018 (unified with the TNA World Championship)
Statistics
- First champion: Aron Rex
- Final champion: Austin Aries
- Most reigns: Moose (2 reigns)
- Longest reign: Moose (2nd Reign, 174 days)
- Shortest reign: Josh Mathews (1st Reign, 1 day)
- Oldest champion: Austin Aries (39 years, 274 days)
- Youngest champion: Drew Galloway (31 years, 215 days)
- Heaviest champion: Moose 299 lb (136 kg)
- Lightest champion: Josh Mathews 143 lb (65 kg)

The Impact Grand Championship was a professional wrestling championship owned by Impact Wrestling.

== History ==
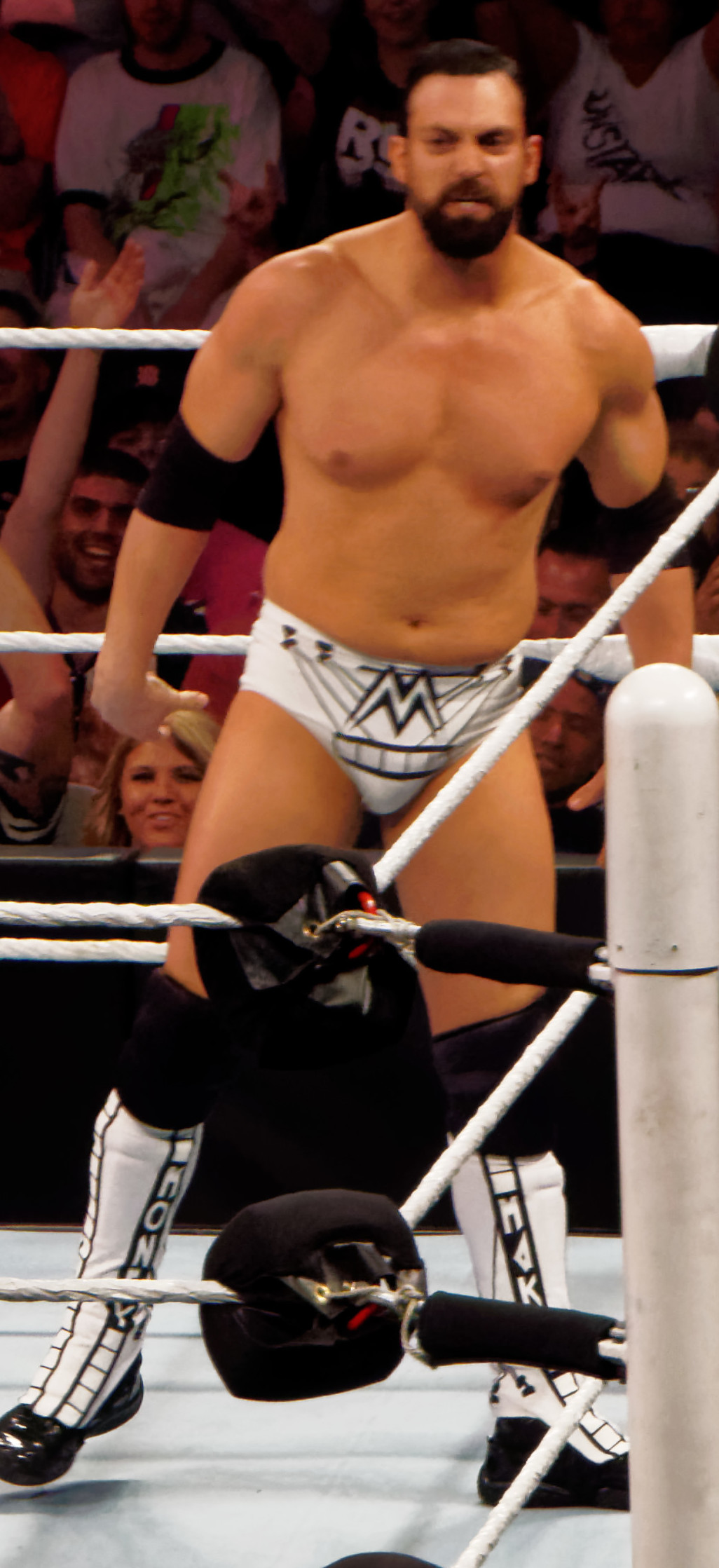
Inaugural champion Aron Rex

The title was introduced at the August 13, 2016, tapings of TNA's television program Impact Wrestling, after then-TNA President Billy Corgan announced that the TNA King of the Mountain Championship would be deactivated and retired in favor of the new championship. Corgan also announced an eight-man single elimination tournament that would feature new rules that would apply to the title. The new rules would be similar to how bouts were contested in professional wrestling in Europe in which each match would consist of three timed rounds, with a team of judges to determine the outcome based on points, if there is no winner via pin or submission within the time limit. The final match of the tournament took place at Bound for Glory on October 2, with Aron Rex becoming the inaugural champion by defeating Eddie Edwards (replacement for the legitimately injured Drew Galloway).

On the January 25, 2018 Genesis episode of Impact!, Matt Sydal defeated champion Ethan Carter III in a "No Rounds, No Judges" match. Subsequent title defenses would also be contested under standard rules, no longer using rounds, points systems or judges.

On June 4, 2018, during the Slammiversary XVI press conference, Austin Aries announced that the Grand and Impact World Championship would be merged/unified.

=== Original rules ===
- Three 3 minute rounds, with special event matches going 5 minutes per round.
- 10 point must system.
- Judging categories: Physicality, aggressiveness, controlling the action.
- Wins can happen anytime via pin or submission.
- If there is no winner after three rounds, a winner is decided by judge's decision.

== Championship Tournament(s) ==
=== Inaugural championship tournament (2016) ===
Quarterfinals
Braxton Sutter	06:43
Drew Galloway	Sub
Eddie Edwards	Sub
Mahabali Shera	06:53
Aron Rex	Pin
Trevor Lee	04:55
Jessie Godderz	08:14
Eli Drake	Pin

Semifinals
Drew Galloway	Split
Eddie Edwards	09:00
Aron Rex	Pin
Eli Drake	08:41

Final
Eddie Edwards †	15:00
Aron Rex	Split

† Edwards replaced Drew Galloway, who was legitimately injured before the finals.

== Reigns ==
=== Reigns ===
As of June 24, 2026, there have been eight reigns between seven different wrestlers. Aron Rex became the inaugural champion by defeating Eddie Edwards in the tournament final at 2016's Bound for Glory on October 2. Moose holds the most reigns with two, with his second reign being the longest at 174 days, while Josh Mathews' reign is the shortest at one day.

Key
No.	Overall reign number
Reign	Reign number for the specific champion
Days	Number of days held

No.	Champion	Championship change			Reign statistics		Notes	Ref.
No.	Champion	Date	Event	Location	Reign	Days	Notes	Ref.
Impact Wrestling
1	Aron Rex	October 2, 2016	Bound for Glory	Orlando, FL	1	7	Defeated Eddie Edwards in a tournament final by split decision to become the inaugural champion. Edwards was a substitute for Drew Galloway, who was legitimately injured.	
2	Moose	October 9, 2016	Impact Wrestling	Orlando, FL	1	90	Aired on tape delay on December 1, 2016.	
3	Drew Galloway	January 7, 2017	Impact Wrestling	Orlando, FL	1	5	Aired on tape delay on January 19, 2017.	
4	Moose	January 12, 2017	Impact Wrestling	Orlando, FL	2	174	Won by split decision. Aired on tape delay on March 2, 2017.	
Global Force Wrestling (GFW)
5	Ethan Carter III	July 5, 2017	Impact!	Orlando, FL	1	128	Won by split decision. Aired on tape delay on August 3, 2017.	
Impact Wrestling
6	Matt Sydal	November 10, 2017	Impact!	Ottawa, ON	1	64	Aired on tape delay on January 25, 2018.	
7	Josh Mathews	January 13, 2018	Impact!	Orlando, FL	1	1	Mathews was gifted the title by Matt Sydal. Aired on tape delay March 15, 2018.	
8	Austin Aries	January 14, 2018	Impact!	Orlando, FL	1	141	Defeated Matt Sydal (defending on Josh Mathews' behalf) in a Winner Takes All match, with Aries' Impact World Heavyweight Championship also at stake. Aired on tape delay on March 29, 2018.	
—	Unified	June 4, 2018	Slammiversary XVI Press Conference	Toronto, ON	—	—	Aries unified the title with the TNA World Championship.	

== Combined reigns ==
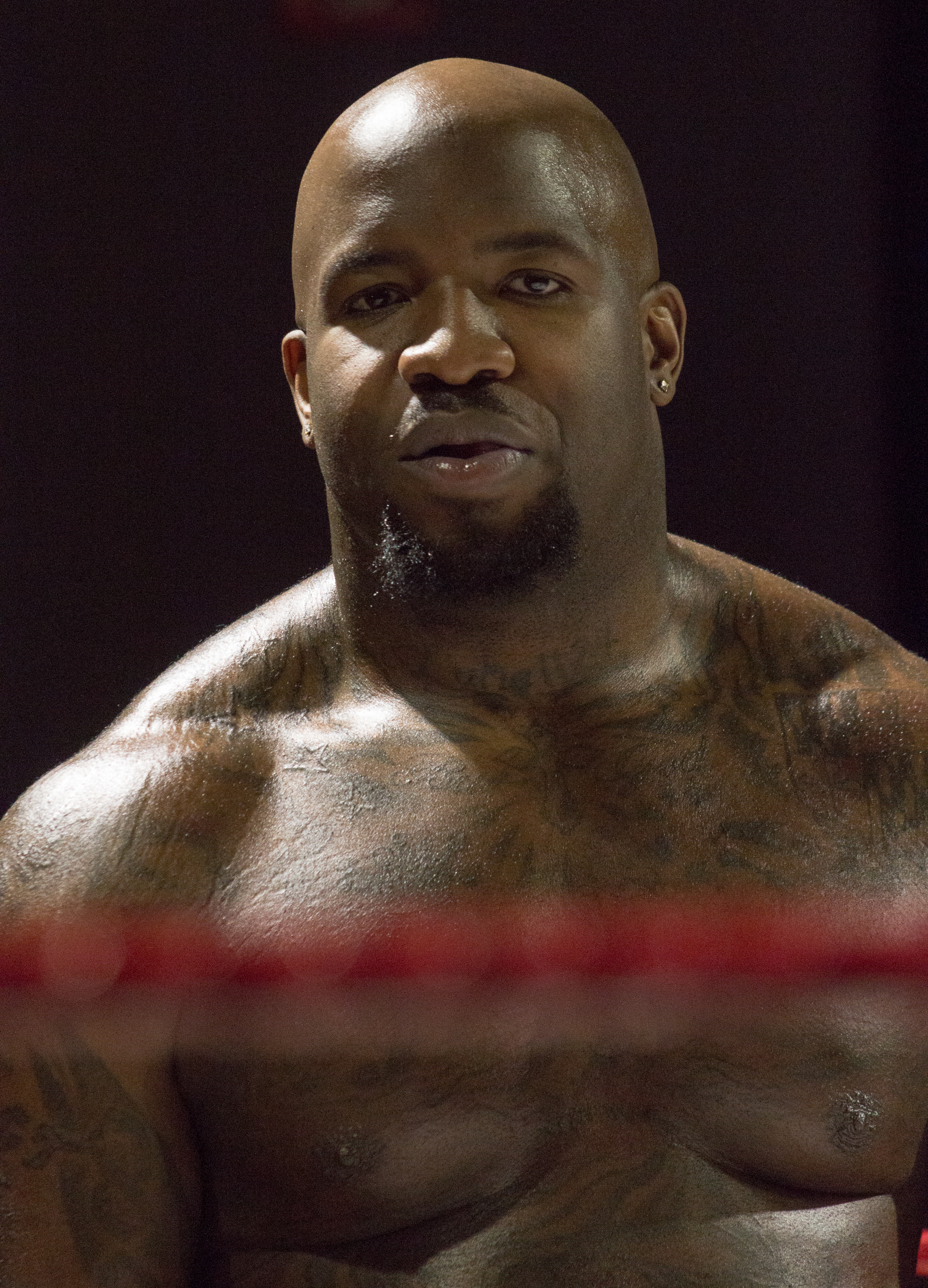
Record two-time, longest reigning and combined reigning champion Moose

Rank	Wrestler	No. of reigns	Combined days
1	Moose	2	264
2	Austin Aries	1	141
3	Ethan Carter III	1	128
4	Matt Sydal	1	64
5	Aron Rex	1	7
6	Drew Galloway	1	5
7	Josh Mathews	1	1

== See also ==
- List of former championships in Total Nonstop Action Wrestling
