= TNA Television Championship =

Former professional wrestling championship

- The TNA Television Championship belt

Details
- Promotion: Total Nonstop Action Wrestling (TNA)
- Date established: October 23, 2008
- Date retired: August 12, 2016

Other names
- TNA Legends Championship (2008–2009); TNA Global Championship (2009–2010); TNA Television Championship (2010–2014); TNA King of the Mountain Championship (2015–2016)
Statistics
- First champion: Booker T
- Final champion: Bobby Lashley
- Most reigns: Eric Young (3 reigns)
- Longest reign: Abyss (396 days)
- Shortest reign: P. J. Black and Bobby Lashley (1 day)
- Oldest champion: Kevin Nash (49 years)
- Youngest champion: Robbie E (27 years)
- Heaviest champion: Abyss (350 Ibs)
- Lightest champion: Robbie E (201 Ibs)

The TNA Television Championship was a professional wrestling championship owned by the promotion Total Nonstop Action Wrestling (TNA, later Impact Wrestling, now TNA). It was introduced on the October 23, 2008 episode of TNA's television program TNA Impact! as the TNA Legends Championship. It was later known as the TNA Global Championship and the TNA King of the Mountain Championship. The title appeared in Global Force Wrestling (GFW), during a talent exchange partnership.

As a professional wrestling championship, it was won via a planned ending to a match or awarded to a wrestler because of a storyline. All title changes occurred at TNA-promoted events. Reigns that occurred on TNA Impact!, or its later title Impact Wrestling, usually aired on tape delay. The first champion was Booker T. The final champion was Lashley, as the title was retired on August 12, 2016. There were a total of 26 reigns among 20 wrestlers.

== History ==
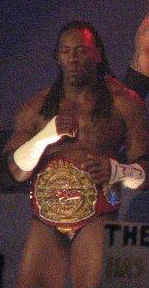
Booker T, inaugural TNA Legends Champion

The title was introduced during a storyline that pitted The TNA Front Line against The Main Event Mafia. In the weeks leading up to the unveiling of the physical belt, Booker T carried around a steel briefcase. On the October 23, 2008, episode of Impact!, Booker T removed the belt from the briefcase, introducing it as the "TNA Legends Championship", and declaring himself the first champion. He went on to state that the championship was his and that he would defend it when he saw fit; this meant that the championship was unsanctioned by TNA in the storyline.

On March 15, 2009, at TNA's Destination X pay-per-view (PPV) event, AJ Styles defeated Booker T to win the championship. Afterwards on the March 19, 2009, episode of Impact!, Styles was credited as becoming the first TNA Grand Slam Champion, by winning the World Heavyweight (NWA or TNA), the World Tag Team (NWA or TNA), the TNA X Division Championship, and the Legends Championship. TNA Management Director Jim Cornette then announced that the TNA Legends Championship had become an official TNA sanctioned championship thanks to Styles defeating Booker T for it legally via the contract the two had signed to make the match official.

On the October 29, 2009, episode of Impact!, then-champion Eric Young renamed the title the "TNA Global Championship". He went on to declare that he was not going to defend it against any American wrestlers nor on American soil. However, Young's first defense was on the December 10, 2009, episode of Impact! in Orlando, Florida against Japanese female wrestler Hamada. Young's second, third and fourth defenses lived up to his earlier decree, when he defended against Suicide in Glasgow, Hamada in Bournemouth, and unsuccessfully against Welsh wrestler Rob Terry in Cardiff, Wales at a live event on January 27, 2010. On the July 22, 2010, episode of Impact!, Terry lost the Global Championship to AJ Styles. Styles then renamed the title the "TNA Television Championship" on the July 29, 2010, episode of Impact!.

On the April 19, 2012, episode of the newly titled Impact Wrestling, TNA General Manager Hulk Hogan ordered that the TNA Television Championship had to be defended every week. The weekly title defenses lasted until the June 21, 2012, episode of Impact Wrestling.

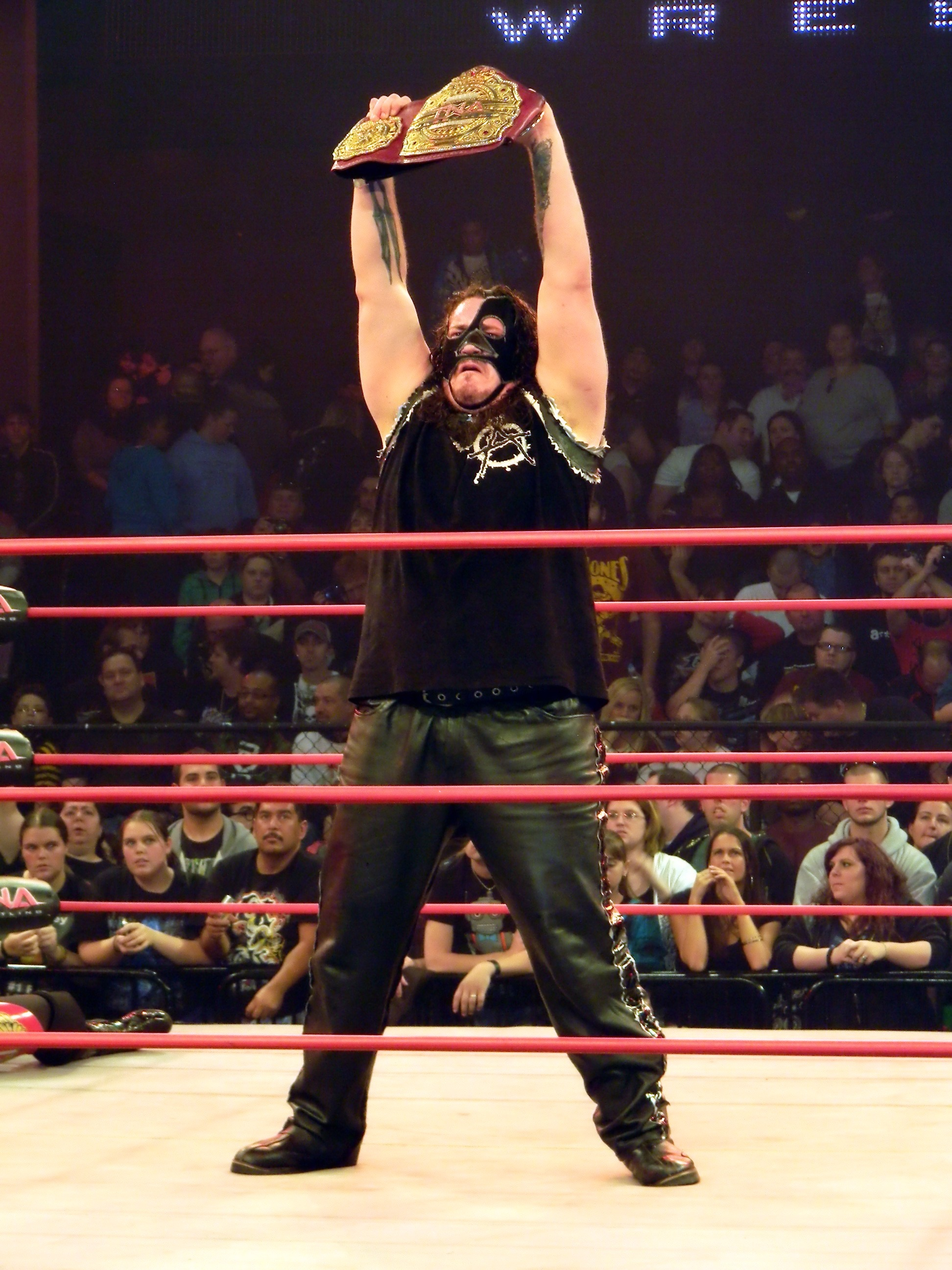
Abyss was the longest reigning champion

On July 3, 2014, TNA Executive Director Kurt Angle declared the championship inactive. The title was reactivated on June 25, 2015, by TNA under the new name of the "TNA King of the Mountain Championship." TNA announced that a new champion would be determined in a King of the Mountain match at their Slammiversary PPV event on June 28. Jeff Jarrett defeated Matt Hardy, Eric Young, Drew Galloway, and Bobby Roode to win the championship. The title ended up appearing in GFW at a July 9 live event where Young attacked Jarrett and stole the championship belt.

During the August 18, 2016, taping of Impact Wrestling, it was announced that the King of the Mountain Championship was vacated, deactivated and retired with announcement of a new title, the Impact Grand Championship.

== Reigns ==
The inaugural champion was Booker T, who awarded the championship to himself on the October 23, 2008, episode of Impact!. Eric Young holds the record for most reigns, with three, and is the only wrestler to hold the title under all four of its incarnations. Abyss' second reign is the longest in the title's history at 396 days. P. J. Black and Lashley share the record for shortest reign in the title's history at one day. Abyss holds the record for combined days as champion, with 460. Lashley was the final champion, having defeated James Storm for the championship with his X Division and World Heavyweight Championships on the line, and unifying the title with his World Title, thus retiring the King of the Mountain Championship in the process.

Overall, there have been 25 reigns shared among 19 wrestlers, with three vacancies and two deactivations.

== See also ==
- List of former championships in Total Nonstop Action Wrestling
