= Mario Bokara =

Croatian-American professional wrestler

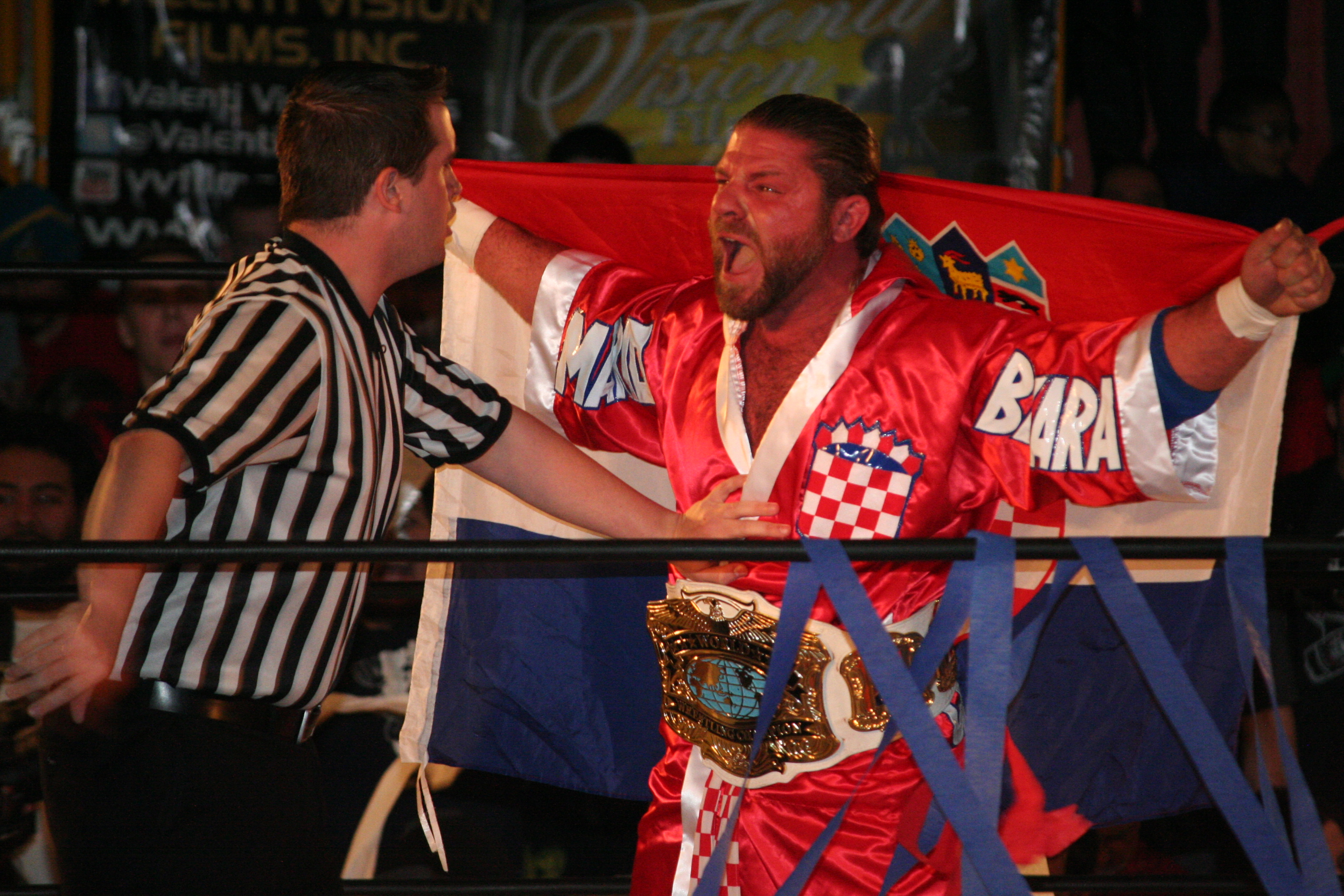
- Bokara in 2014

Personal information
- Born: New Milford, New Jersey

Professional wrestling career
- Ring name(s): Mario Bokara; Mo Sexton; Mo Sexy; Mo Sextyn
- Billed height: 5 ft 11 in (180 cm)
- Billed weight: 220 lb (100 kg)
- Billed from: Rahway, New Jersey; Croatia
- Trained by: Rip Rogers; Gino Caruso
- Debut: August 2000

Mario Bokara is a Croatian-American professional wrestler. He is known for his time with Impact Wrestling.

== Professional wrestling career ==
=== Independent circuit (2000–present) ===
Bokara started wrestling in August 2000. Using the ring name Mo Sexton, Bokara began wrestling in and around the New Jersey independent circuit for promotions such as Jersey Championship Wrestling, Jersey All Pro Wrestling, American Championship Entertainment and World Xtreme Wrestling. In the summer of 2005, Bokara wrestled two matches for WWE's Velocity and Sunday Night Heat programs losing to Simon Dean and Rob Conway. In 2006, Bokara was signed to WWE's developmental territory Ohio Valley Wrestling, leaving after a few months. At OVW Six Flags Summer Sizzler Series 2006, Bokara as Mo Sexton, along with Cody Runnels, Kasey James, Roadkill and Chet the Jet defeated Jack Bull, Pat Buck, Rahim, Deuce and Domino. In 2010 at Mercury Rising, Bokara, Bryan Danielson and Christopher Daniels were defeated by Dan Maff for the American Championship Entertainment heavyweight championship. In 2012, Bokara began wrestling for New Jersey's Pro Wrestling Syndicate as Mo Sexton but would eventually start wrestling there under his real name in 2013, in addition to highlighting his Croatian heritage. In April 2014, Bokara won the PWS Heavyweight Championship by defeating Bonesaw and Kevin Matthews in a triple threat match for his first reign. He would go on to lose the belt to Bonesaw at PWS's Nightmare Before Christmas in December 2014. Bokara won the belt again in March 2015 by defeating Fallah Bahh. Two months later, he would lose the championship to Dan Maff. On November 19, 2016, Bokara defeated Crowbar, Anthony Bowens and Bull James at a Wrestlepro event. At Create A Pro Wrestling Academy's Unsettled Differences, Bokara defeated Kevin Matthews.

=== Impact Wrestling / Global Force Wrestling (2017–2018) ===
Bokara debuted for Impact Wrestling on the March 23, 2017 episode of Impact Wrestling, teaming with Fallah Bahh and Idris Abraham in a losing effort to Mahabali Shera, Garza Jr. and Laredo Kid. On April 2, 2017, it was reported that Bokara officially signed a one-year deal with Impact Wrestling. On the April 27 of Impact!, Bokara and Bahh lost to the Veterans of War (Mayweather and Wilcox). Bokara and Bahh were once again defeated by the Veterans of War in the first round of the GFW Tag Team Championship tournament. At One Night Only: No Surrender 2017 Bokara was defeated by Dezmond Xavier. On the August 31, 2017 edition of Impact, Bokara and Bahh were defeated by oVe.

On January 2, 2018, Bokara underwent a successful surgery for a torn ACL and Meniscus reconstruction.

== Championships and accomplishments ==
- American Championship Entertainment
  - ACE Heavyweight Championship (1 time)
  - ACE Diamond Championship (1 time)
  - ACE Tag Team Championship (1 time) – with Jay Lethal
- Create A Pro Wrestling Academy
  - CAP Championship (1 time)
- East Coast Pro Wrestling
  - ECPW Heavyweight Championship (1 time)
  - ECPW Television Championship (1 time)
  - ECPW Tag Team Championship (2 times) – with Red Hot Russ
- JWA Wrestling Alliance
  - JWA Tag Team Championships (1 time) - with Red Hot Russ
- Monster Factory Pro Wrestling
  - MFPW Tag Team Championship (1 time) – with Fallah Bahh
  - MF Cup Tournament (2017) – with Fallah Bahh
- NWA Cyberspace
  - NWA Cyberspace Tag Team Championships (1 time) - with Julio Dinero
- Pro Wrestling Syndicate
  - PWS Heavyweight Championship (2 times)
