= Fallah Bahh =

American professional wrestler (born 1985)

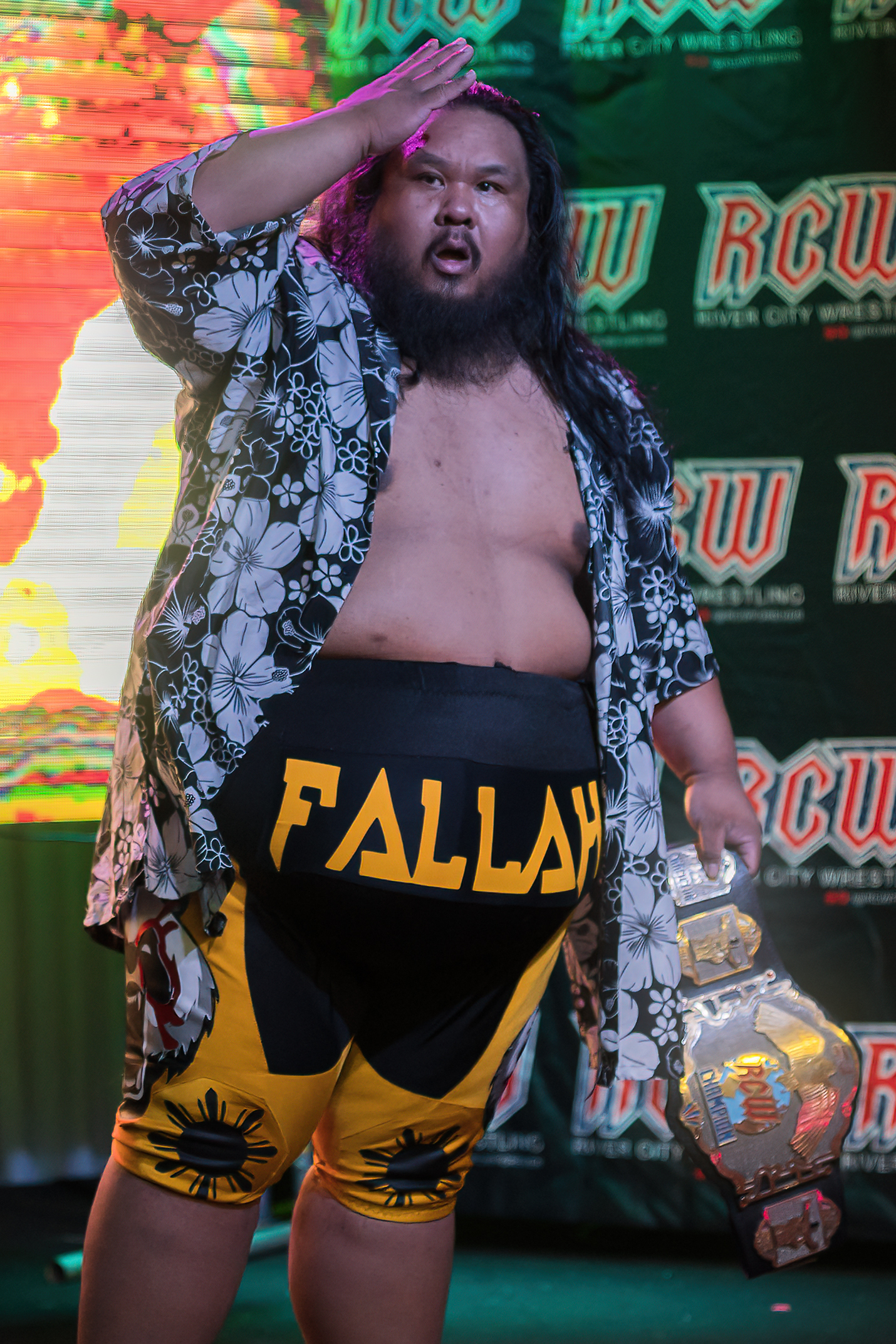
- Bahh in September of 2021

Personal information
- Born: Francis Flores; August 12, 1985 (age 41) Bloomfield, New Jersey, United States

Professional wrestling career
- Ring name(s): Fala; Fallah; Fallah Bahh; Franciz
- Billed height: 5 ft 11 in (1.80 m)
- Billed weight: 425 lb (193 kg)
- Billed from: Nueva Ecija, Philippines
- Trained by: Kevin Knight
- Debut: 2005

Francis Flores (born August 12, 1985) is an American professional wrestler. He currently performs on the independent circuit – predominantly for WrestlePro – under the ring name Fallah Baah. He is best known for his time with Impact Wrestling. Baah began his wrestling career on New Jersey's independent circuit, wrestling for both the Independent Wrestling Federation (IWF) and Monster Factory Pro Wrestling (MFPW).

== Professional wrestling career ==
=== Early Career (2005–2017) ===
Flores began his wrestling career in 2005, wrestling under the name Franciz for Independent Wrestling Federation in New Jersey. While in IWF, Flores would become a three time tag team champion as well one time IWF American Champion, defeating Kareem West for the title and a two time IWF Heavyweight Champion.

In 2011, Flores wrestled under the names Fala / Fallah, before fully transitioning to using Fallah Bahh. In 2016, Bahh began teaming with Mario Bokara and Bobby Wayward under the tag team name The Money and the Miles for New Jersey's Monster Factory Pro Wrestling, winning the MFPW Tag Team Championship with Bokara on October 15, 2016.

=== Impact Wrestling (2017–2022) ===
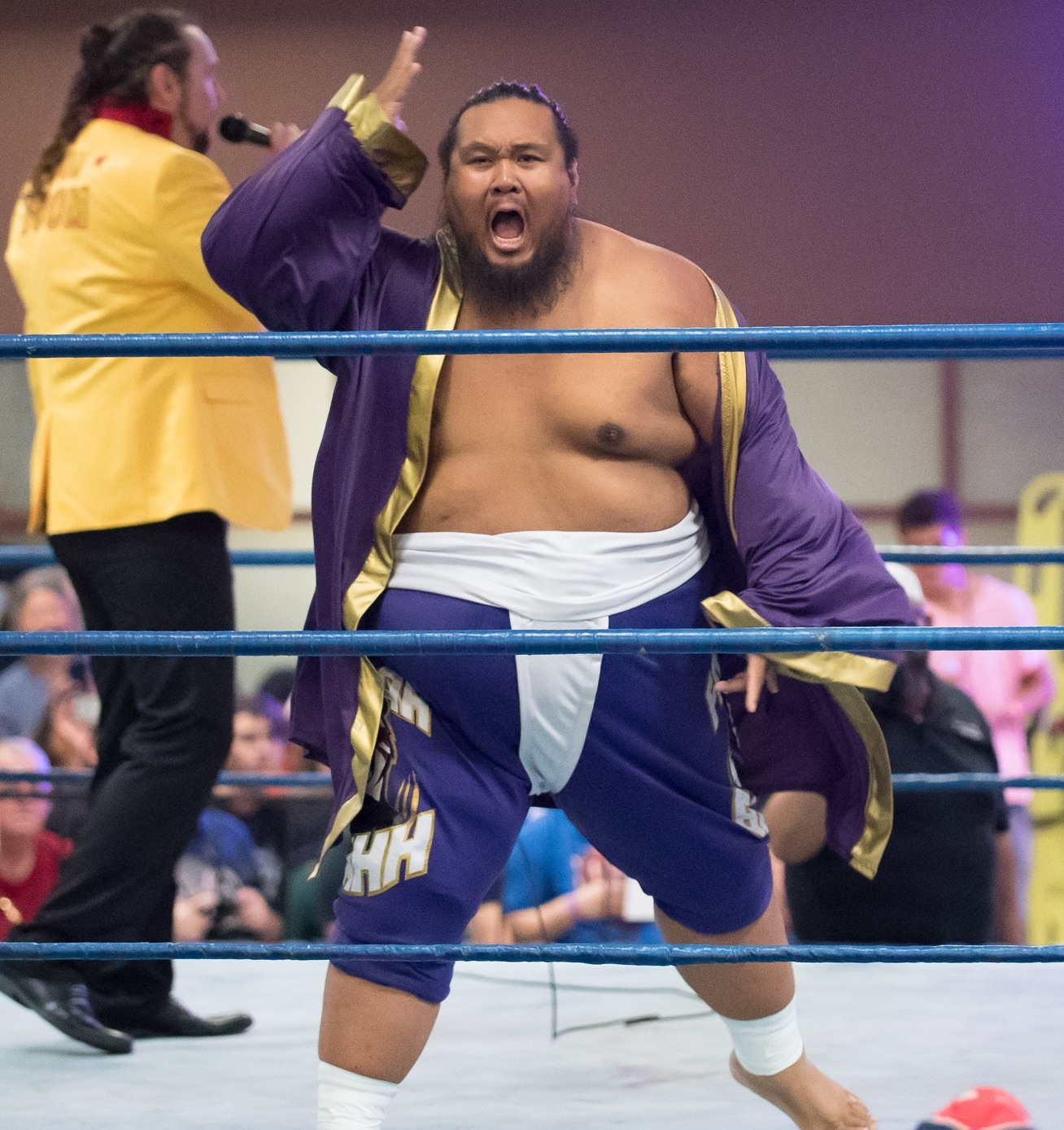
Fallah Bahh in 2018

On the March 3, 2017, taping of Impact!, Fallah Bahh made his Impact Wrestling debut in a six-man tag match. He teamed up with Idris Abraham and Mario Bokara against Laredo Kid, Garza Jr., and Mahabali Shera in a losing effort. It was revealed on April 2, 2017, that Bahh had signed a deal with the company. On the November 16 episode of Impact! Bahh competed in an Impact Grand Championship match against champion Ethan Carter III. Bahh won the first round, but lost in the third round via pinfall. On the Thanksgiving episode of Impact! Bahh took part in the annual Turkey Bowl match, renamed "Eli Drake’s Gravy Train Turkey Trot" for the night alongside Allie, Garza Jr., Richard Justice and Eddie Edwards taking on the team of KM, Laurel Van Ness, El Hijo del Fantasma, Chris Adonis and Caleb Konley, with Bahh's team picking up the win.

Bahh once again competed for the Impact Grand Championship on the January 4, 2018, episode of Impact!, facing off against champion Ethan Carter III and Matt Sydal in a three-way in a losing effort. On September 13 episode of Impact!, Austin Aries granted Bahh a match for the Impact World Championship. Bahh faced Aries in the main event of that episode, but was not able to win the title as he lost to Aries. Bahh formed a tag team in Impact with KM. on the October 11 episode of Impact, Bahh, Eddie Edwards and Johnny Impact lost to Austin Aries, Moose and Killer Kross. On the February 1 episode of Impact, Bahh lost to Psycho Clown. On the February 15 episode of Impact, Team IMPACT (Bahh, Eddie Edwards, Eli Drake and Sami Callihan) lost to Team AAA (Psycho Clown, Vikingo, Aerostar and Puma King). On the March 1 episode of Impact, Bahh and KM defeated Reno Scum. Following KM’s departure in 2019, Bahh forged an alliance with TJP in September, and they began feuding with Michael Elgin. This also marked the first time Bahh spoke in English on television, as during an early part of his tenure in Impact, he often repeated his surname (“Bahh!”), interpreting it into a sentence.

In October 2021, Bahh entered a tournament to determine the inaugural Impact Digital Media Champion, where he defeated Sam Beale in the first round but lost to Jordynne Grace in the final at Bound for Glory. In January 2022, his profile was removed from Impact's official website, signaling the end of his run with the company.

== Championships and accomplishments ==
- Chaotic Wrestling
  - CW Tag Team Championship (2 times) – with Kongo
- Impact Wrestling
  - Gravy Train Turkey Trot (2017) – with Eddie Edwards, Allie, Richard Justice, and Garza Jr.
  - Gravy Train Turkey Trot (2018) – with KM, Alisha Edwards, Kikutaro and Dezmond Xavier
- Independent Wrestling Federation
  - IWF Heavyweight Championship (2 times)
  - IWF American Championship (1 time)
  - IWF Tag Team Championship (3 times) – with Travis Blake (1), Chris Steeler (1), and Dan McGuire (1)
  - 4th Annual Commissioner's Cup (2006) – with Fred Sampson
  - Commissioner's Cup Tag Team Tournament (2008) – with Travis Blake
- Monster Factory Pro Wrestling
  - MFPW Tag Team Championship (2 times) – with Bobby Wayward (1) and Mario Bokara (1)
  - MF Cup Tournament (2017) – with Mario Bokara
- NWA Liberty City/NWA On Fire
  - NWA On Fire Tag Team Championship (2 times) – with Makua
- Pro Wrestling Illustrated
  - Ranked 370 of the top 500 singles wrestlers in the PWI 500 in 2009
- Pro Wrestling Syndicate
  - PWS Heavyweight Championship (1 time)
  - PWS Tag Team Championship (1 time) – with DJ Phat Pat
- Reality of Wrestling
  - ROW Heavyweight Championship (1 time)
- River City Wrestling
  - RCW Championship (1 time)
- Warriors of Wrestling
  - WOW Tag Team Championship (1 time) – with Harley
- WrestlePro
  - WrestlePro Tag Team Championship (1 time) – with KM
  - WrestlePro Alaska Tag Team Championship (1 time) – with KM
  - WrestlePro Silver Championship (1 time)
  - WrestlePro Alaska Last Frontier Championship (1 time)
