= Kevin Matthews (wrestler) =

American professional wrestler

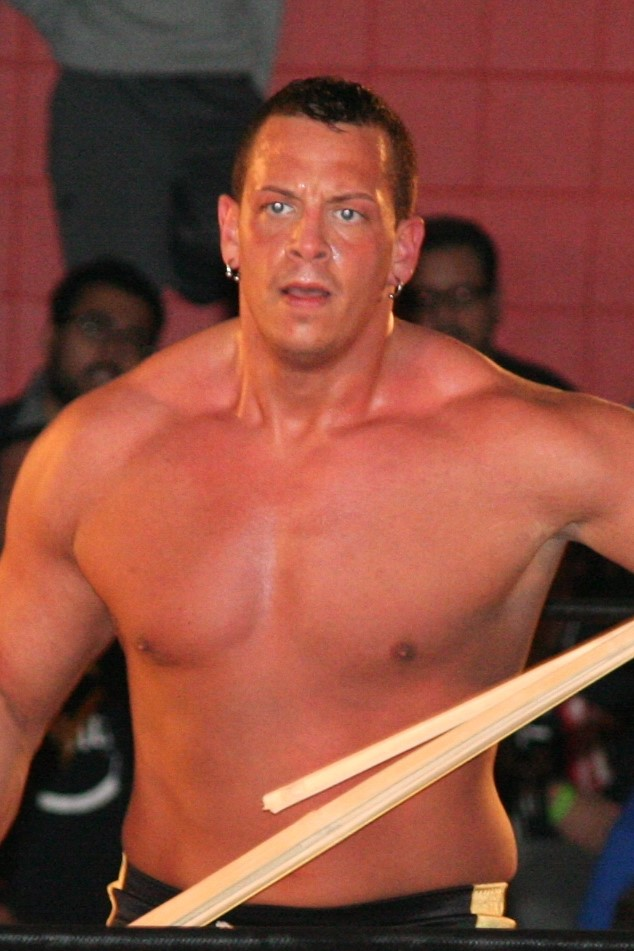
- Matthews in 2014

Personal information
- Born: Kevin Matthew McDonald; February 10, 1983 (age 43) New York City, U.S.

Professional wrestling career
- Ring name(s): Bobby Hollywood; Kevin Matthews; KM; Kydd Enigma
- Billed height: 6 ft 5 in (1.96 m)
- Billed weight: 265 lb (120 kg)
- Billed from: Brooklyn, New York
- Debut: March 18, 2000

Kevin Matthew McDonald (born February 10, 1983) is an American professional wrestler. He is signed to All Elite Wrestling (AEW) as a coach and producer. He is best known for his time in Impact Wrestling, under the ring name KM.

== Professional wrestling career ==
=== Independent promotions and WWE appearance (2000–2014) ===
As a native of New York, Matthews wrestled in many promotions around New York City and New Jersey early in his career. In 2004 he wrestled for World Xtreme Wrestling in Pennsylvania, teaming up with Greg Matthews. He was managed by Krissy Vaine. On June 14, 2005, Matthews wrestled as enhancement talent in his only appearance in WWE. He teamed with Nick Berk, losing to MNM (Joey Mercury and Johnny Nitro).

He also wrestled in Wrestling Superstars Unleashed from 2006-2010. On December 12, 2009 Matthews lost to Tito Santana at NWS/WSU The Awesome Challenge in Flemington, New Jersey. Matthews spent most of his career performing for Pro Wrestling Syndicate. On May 8, 2010 Matthews defeated boxing legend Butterbean for the PWS Heavyweight Title. The title was vacated on August 20, 2010. He would regain the title by defeating Sami Callihan on June 2, 2012. On November 20, 2012 Matthews dropped the title to Matt Hardy. He would win the title back by defeating Hardy on February 9, 2013. During his reign he defeated Colt Cabana, Anthony Nese, and Homicide. He would drop the title to Alex Reynolds on September 20, 2013. On May 17, 2014 he defeated Jeff Jarrett.

=== Impact Wrestling (2017–2019) ===
On March 6, 2017, it was reported that McDonald had signed with Impact Wrestling. On the March 30 episode of Impact!, he debuted as Sienna's cousin, defeating Braxton Sutter with interference from Sienna, thus establishing himself as a heel. On the May 25 episode of Impact Wrestling, KM teamed with Kongo Kong defeating Braxton Sutter and Mahabali Shera, after both teams began a feud with each other. On the June 15 episode of Impact Wrestling that occurred in Mumbai, India, KM competed in a Gauntlet match for the inaugural Sony SIX Invitational Trophy, which was won by Mahabali Shera after KM was eliminated by Shera.

On July 2, during the Pre Show of Slammiversary XV, KM teamed with Kongo Kong and Laurel Van Ness losing to Mahabali Shera, Braxton Sutter, and Allie in a six-person tag team match. On the January 18, 2018, Impact Wrestling tapings, KM attacked James Storm with a beer bottle, smashing it over his head, after he joined the American Top Team.

KM then later formed an alliance with Fallah Bahh turning face in the process. In March 2019, his profile was moved to the alumni section of the Impact roster page on their website. Subsequently he stopped appearing on Impact Wrestling's weekly program.

Matthews would later argue with Impact Wrestling Executive Vice President Scott D'Amore on Twitter over the amount they pay their talent.

=== All Elite Wrestling (2021–present) ===
KM debuted for All Elite Wrestling (AEW) on October 4, 2021 on an episode of AEW Dark: Elevation in a match against Sonny Kiss. On the May 11, 2022 episode of AEW Dynamite, KM would appear as a security guard in a contract signing between MJF and Wardlow for a match at Double or Nothing. He would again appear on Elevation against John Silver on June 27, 2022. In Rochester, New York on July 6, he would return as a part of American Top Team with Dan Lambert, for the TNT Championship match between Scorpio Sky and Wardlow.

In June 2023, it was reported the Matthews had taken a job as a backstage coach/producer for AEW.

== Championships and accomplishments ==
- Impact Wrestling
  - Gravy Train Turkey Trot (2018) – with Fallah Bahh, Alisha Edwards, Kikutaro, Dezmond Xavier
- Pro Wrestling Illustrated
  - PWI ranked him #211 of the top 500 singles wrestlers in the PWI 500 in 2017
- Pro Wrestling Syndicate
  - PWS Heavyweight Championship (3 times)
- Stars & Stripes Championship Wrestling
  - SSCW Television Championship (1 time)
- World Xtreme Wrestling
  - WXW Tag Team Championship (1 time) – with Greg Matthews
- WrestlePro
  - UCE Championship (1 time)
  - WrestlePro Tag Team Championship (1 time) – with Fallah Bahh
  - WrestlePro Alaska Tag Team Championship (1 time) – with Fallah Bahh
