= Great Canadian Wrestling =

Canadian professional wrestling promotion

- Logo of the Great Canadian Wrestling
- Acronym: GCW
- Founded: 2005
- Style: Professional wrestling
- Headquarters: Oshawa, Ontario, Canada
- Website: http://gcwe.ca/

Great Canadian Wrestling (GCW) is an independent professional wrestling promotion company based in Oshawa, Ontario. GCW was founded in 2005 and promotes shows throughout Southern Ontario. Since 2005, the company also hosts an annual Great Canadian Wrestling Expo; it takes place over several days and brings together a large group of wrestlers. Currently, four championships are defended at GCW events.

GCW events featured a roster of wrestlers who compete regularly for the promotion as well as occasional appearances by wrestlers currently signed with major promotions. In addition, a group of "legends", or veteran wrestlers from other promotions, also would compete on occasion for GCW.

On February 18, 2009, GCW began an online broadcast titled GCWtv.

In November 2015, GCW rebranded itself as Infinity Wrestling.

== History ==
GCW gives out the Ontario Indy Wrestling Awards annually. It is eligible to all wrestling promotions and wrestlers who perform in Ontario.

== Wrestling Expo ==
Beginning in 2005, the promotion's first year, GCW has assembled a group of wrestlers from various promotions to compete in a multi-day event known as the Great Canadian Wrestling Expo. The first Expo attracted 600 visitors. It also included merchandise sales from a wide variety of vendors, an auction, and opportunities to meet with the wrestlers for autographs and photographs. Ed the Sock was named commissioner for the event; proceeds from the weekend were donated to the Sick Kids Foundation. In 2006, the event was combined with the 10th Annual Anime North Convention. The event featured primarily traditional wrestling matches. However, it also included gimmick matches such as one between wrestlers competing as the Green Power Ranger and the Red Power Ranger for leadership of the Power Rangers, as well as an encounter between Team Sailor Moon and Team Rocket. This cross-promotional event attracted 11,286 paid attendees. Since 2006, GCW has continued to promote a series of shows along with Anime North.

== Wrestlers ==
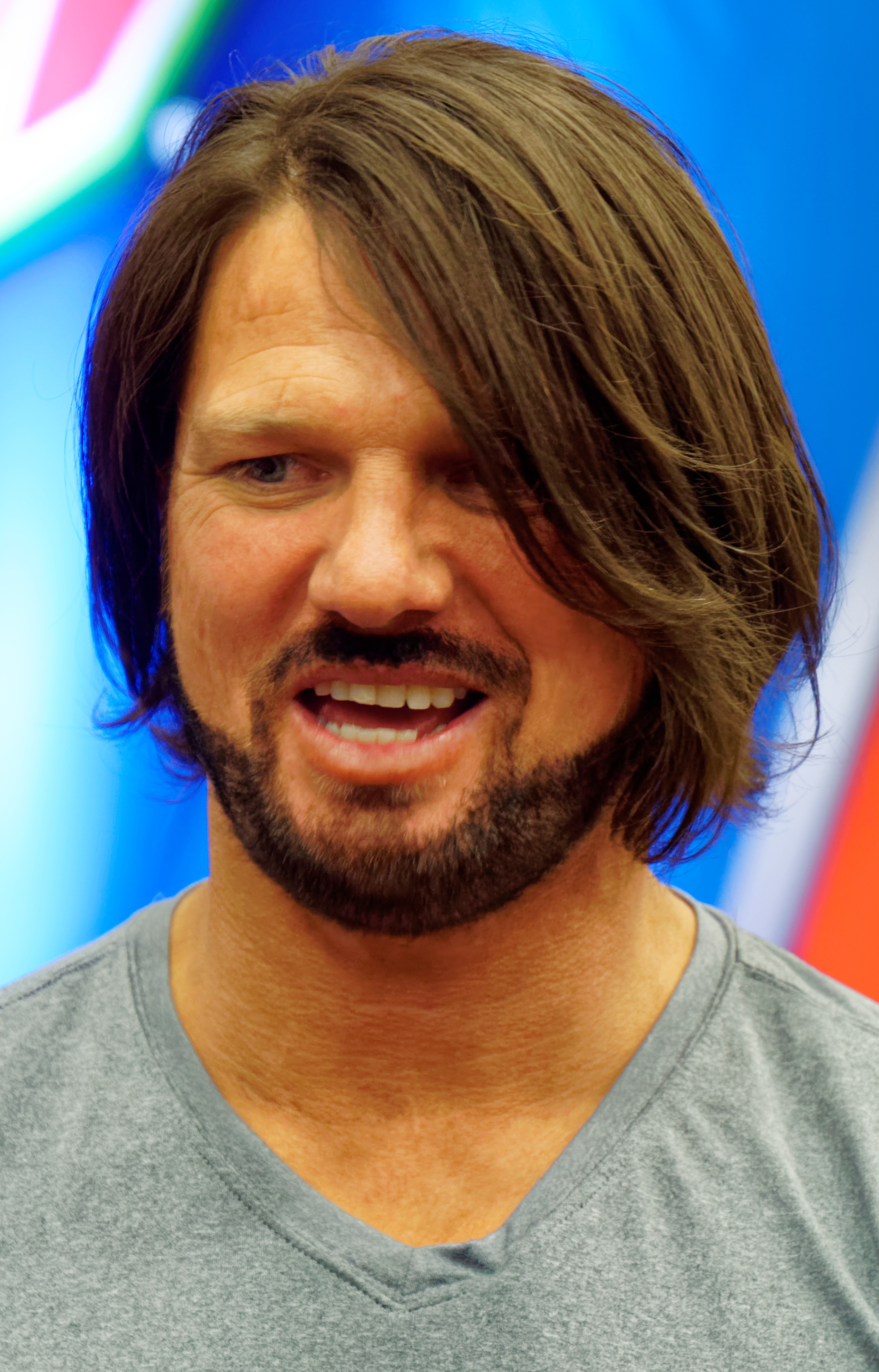
WWE wrestler A.J. Styles made appearances for GCW.

Although GCW promotes matches with many wrestlers who have not appeared in major promotions, the organization also has an agreement with Total Nonstop Action Wrestling (TNA) that facilitates events titled TNmAyhem, in which wrestlers from TNA compete. The first of these cards took place on May 24, 2007, and features appearances by such wrestlers as Raven, Christopher Daniels, and A.J. Styles. GCW events also feature wrestlers who have gained fame in major American promotions, such as Billy Gunn, The Honky Tonk Man, and Koko B. Ware.

=== Roster ===
GCW had a regular group of wrestlers that competed for the promotion; this includes both male and female wrestlers. In addition, many wrestlers made sporadic appearances for the company. On the company roster, GCW divides these occasional performers into two groups: legends (longtime wrestlers, many of whom are semi-retired) and superstars (wrestlers who currently compete, or have recently competed, for major promotions).

==== Regular roster ====
GCW's regular roster consisted of wrestlers who competed for the promotion on a regular basis:

- Akira Raijin
- Andrew Davis
- Asylum
- Black Serpent
- Brad Freakin Martin
- Bruno Davis
- Bryan Youngblood
- Cody 45
- Cody Deaner
- Crazzy Steve
- Darryl Extreme
- Hayden Avery
- Hornet
- Jake O'Reilly
- James Champagne
- Jeremy Prophet
- Josh Alexander
- King Sphinx
- Matt Burns
- Michael Elgin
- Oroku Ghemma
- Otis Idol
- Phil Atlas
- Razz Monsour
- Rico Montana
- Sebastian Suave
- Sombra
- Steve Brown
- Tiger Star
- Tyler Tirva
- Xtremo

==== W.I.L.D. Division ====
The W.I.L.D. Division consisted of GCW's female wrestlers:

- 21st Century Fox
- Cat Power
- Cherry Bomb
- Deanna Conda
- Jennifer Blake
- Kacey Diamond
- Krystal Banks
- LuFisto
- Mercy
- Miss Danyah
- PJ Tyler
- Nattie Neidhart
- Portia Perez
- Stefany Sinclair
- Tiana Ringer
