= TNA Turkey Bowl =

American wrestling competition

The TNA Turkey Bowl is a special match that airs on the Thanksgiving night episode of Impact!. Initially, it was a tournament held in 2007 and 2008 that aired on the Thanksgiving night episode of TNA Impact!, and consisted of three preliminary three-way matches. Each match featured a member of the Heavyweight Division, the X Division, and the Tag Team Division, with the winner of the match going on to the finals. The winner of the finals, also a three-way match, won $25,000. The wrestler who was pinned in the finals was forced to put on a turkey suit. The 2008 Turkey Bowl would be the last until 2011, where it would return, but as a single match going forward. This format lasted until 2016, save for a two year absence, and for the 2017 Turkey Bowl, it was changed to a five-on-five intergender tag team match.

== Results ==
=== 2007 ===
The inaugural Turkey Bowl was on the November 13, 2007 Thanksgiving edition of TNA Impact! It consisted of three qualification matches to get the Turkey Bowl. The winner of the match was Samoa Joe who pinned A.J. Styles. As a result, Styles was forced into the turkey suit.

No.	Results	Stipulations	Time
1	Samoa Joe defeated Johnny Devine and Kip James	Three-way qualification match for the Turkey Bowl	03:00
2	Chris Sabin defeated Abyss and Brother Devon	Three-way qualification match for the Turkey Bowl	06:00
3	A.J. Styles defeated Christian Cage and Jay Lethal	Three-way qualification match for the Turkey Bowl	13:00
4	Samoa Joe defeated A.J. Styles and Chris Sabin	Turkey Bowl match where the loser is forced into a turkey suit	29:34

=== 2008 ===
The Turkey Bowl returned on the November 27, 2008 Thanksgiving edition of TNA Impact! It consisted of three qualification matches to get to the Turkey Bowl. The winner of the match was Rhino who pinned Alex Shelley. As a result, Shelley was forced into the turkey suit.

No.	Results	Stipulations	Time
1	Rhino defeated Sonjay Dutt (w/ SoCal Val) and Hernandez	Three-way qualification match for the Turkey Bowl	03:30
2	Alex Shelley defeated Consequences Creed and Cute Kip	Three-way qualification match for the Turkey Bowl	03:43
3	Sheik Abdul Bashir defeated Jimmy Rave and Matt Morgan	Three-way qualification match for the Turkey Bowl	03:30
4	Rhino defeated Alex Shelley and Sheik Abdul Bashir	Turkey Bowl match where the loser is forced into a turkey suit	05:11

=== 2011 ===
The Turkey Bowl returned on the November 24, 2011 Thanksgiving edition of Impact Wrestling. Unlike the past tournaments, this one only featured one round instead of having three semi-finals matches. It also did not feature a member of the three divisions. The match featured a one on one match between Eric Young and Robbie E. The winner of the match was Young who pinned Robbie E, but since Robbie E was knocked out, Robbie T was forced into the turkey suit.

No.	Results	Stipulations	Time
1	Eric Young defeated Robbie E (w/ Robbie T)	Turkey Bowl match where the loser is forced into a turkey suit	03:30

=== 2012 ===
The Turkey Bowl returned on the November 22, 2012 Thanksgiving edition of Impact Wrestling. Like the previous year, the Turkey Bowl only featured one round instead of having three semi-finals matches. It also did not feature a member of the three divisions. The match was a three-way between Eric Young, Jessie Godderz and Robbie E. The winner of the match was Young who pinned Godderz. As a result, Godderz was forced into the turkey suit.

No.	Results	Stipulations	Time
1	Eric Young defeated Jessie Godderz and Robbie E	Turkey Bowl match where the loser is forced into a turkey suit	03:31

=== 2013 ===
The Turkey Bowl returned on the November 28, 2013 Thanksgiving edition of Impact Wrestling. The match featured the first ever tag team Turkey Bowl match between The BroMans (Jessie Godderz & Robbie E) facing Dewey Barnes and Norv Fernum. The winners of the match were The BroMans. As a result, Barnes and Fernum were forced into the turkey suits.

No.	Results	Stipulations	Time
1	The BroMans (Jessie Godderz & Robbie E) defeated Dewey Barnes and Norv Fernum	Turkey Bowl match where the loser is forced into a turkey suit	00:18

=== 2016 ===
The Turkey Bowl returned after three years for the November 24, 2016 Thanksgiving edition of Impact Wrestling. Once again, the Turkey Bowl featured Robbie E, who took on Grado in singles completion, defeating him. Aiden O'Shea was the special outside enforcer for the match to ensure that the loser would put on the turkey suit.

No.	Results	Stipulations	Time
1	Robbie E defeated Grado	Turkey Bowl match where the loser is forced into a turkey suit	03:51

=== 2017 ===
Global Champion Eli Drake renamed the Turkey Bowl match as "Eli Drake’s Gravy Train Turkey Trot", where the singles match, used in the previous two Turkey Bowls, was nixed in favor of a five-on-five intergender tag team match.

Eddie Edwards was named as captain of a team consisting of himself, Allie, Richard Justice, Fallah Bahh and Garza Jr., while Chris Adonis was named as captain of the opposing team consisting of himself, El Hijo del Fantasma, Caleb Konley, KM and Laurel Van Ness. As Adonis was the one who got pinned, he had to wear the turkey suit. Adonis initially refused, but Jeremy Borash told him that he would force Drake into it instead, making Adonis reluctantly put it on. Afterwards, the other wrestlers got into a food fight and when Adonis tried to pie Edwards, he moved and Drake got pied instead.

No.	Results	Stipulations	Time
1	Eddie Edwards, Allie, Richard Justice, Fallah Bahh and Garza Jr. defeated Chris Adonis (w/ Eli Drake), El Hijo del Fantasma, Caleb Konley, Laurel Van Ness and KM	Turkey Bowl match where the loser is forced into a turkey suit	16:13

=== 2018 ===
The 2018 Turkey Bowl, promoted as "The Second Annual Eli Drake Gravy Train Turkey Trot", was aired on November 22, 2018. It continued with the five-on-five intergender tag team match, established the previous year.

Fallah Bahh was named as captain of a team consisting of himself, KM, Kikutaro, Dezmond Xavier and Alisha Edwards, while Eli Drake was named as captain of the opposing team consisting of himself, Katarina, Jake Crist, Rohit Raju and Glenn Gilbertti. The teams were chosen by way of a raffle. All wrestlers involved took an oath prior to the match stating that if they were pinned or submitted, they will wear the turkey suit. As Gilbertti was the one who got pinned, he had to wear the turkey suit. Josh Mathews reminded Gilbertti of the oath, but he did not want to put on the turkey suit. Scarlett Bordeaux, the object of Gilbertti's affections, came down to the ring and persuaded him to wear the turkey suit. When he did so, she called him an idiot and walked away.

No.	Results	Stipulations	Time
1	Fallah Bahh, KM, Dezmond Xavier, Kikutaro and Alisha Edwards defeated Eli Drake, Jake Crist, Rohit Raju, Katarina and Glenn Gilbertti (w/ Ohio Versus Everything and the Desi Hit Squad)	Turkey Bowl match where the loser is forced into a turkey suit	16:04

=== 2023 ===
The 2023 Turkey Bowl, promoted once again as The Gravy Train Turkey Trot, returned after a five-year hiatus and was aired on November 23, 2023. It was an eight-man tag team match.

Jake Something, Mike Bailey, Johnny Swinger and PCO defeated Champagne Singh, Jai Vidal and The Good Hands (John Skyler and Jason Hotch) to win. As Vidal was the one who got pinned, he had to wear the turkey suit, but he did not want to put it on. However, per the stipulation, he had to wear the suit or risk being fired from Impact Wrestling. His stablemates Gisele Shaw and Savannah Evans would ultimately force Vidal into the turkey suit.

No.	Results	Stipulations	Time
1	Jake Something, Mike Bailey, Johnny Swinger and PCO defeated Champagne Singh, Jai Vidal and The Good Hands (John Skyler and Jason Hotch)	Turkey Bowl match where the loser is forced into a turkey suit	5:15

=== 2024 ===
In 2024, TNA added a Turkey Bowl match to a TNA+ monthly special for the first time.

Promoted as a "Thanksgiving Turkey Bowl", it was a six-way match that took place on November 29 (the night after Thanksgiving) at Turning Point. The winner of the match was Joe Hendry who pinned Brian Myers. As a result, Myers was forced into the turkey suit.

No.	Results	Stipulations	Time
1	Joe Hendry defeated Brian Myers, Eric Young, Hammerstone, John Skyler and Rhino	Turkey Bowl match where the loser is forced into a turkey suit	8:16

=== 2025 ===
The 2025 Turkey Bowl, promoted once again as the "Thanksgiving Turkey Bowl", aired on November 27, 2025. It was a six-way match. The winner of the match was Brian Myers who pinned Ryan Nemeth. As a result, Nemeth was forced into the turkey suit.

No.	Results	Stipulations	Time
1	Brian Myers defeated Eric Young, Mance Warner, Ryan Nemeth, The Home Town Man and Trey Miguel	Turkey Bowl match where the loser is forced into a turkey suit	8:26
