= Allie (wrestler) =

Canadian professional wrestler (born 1987)

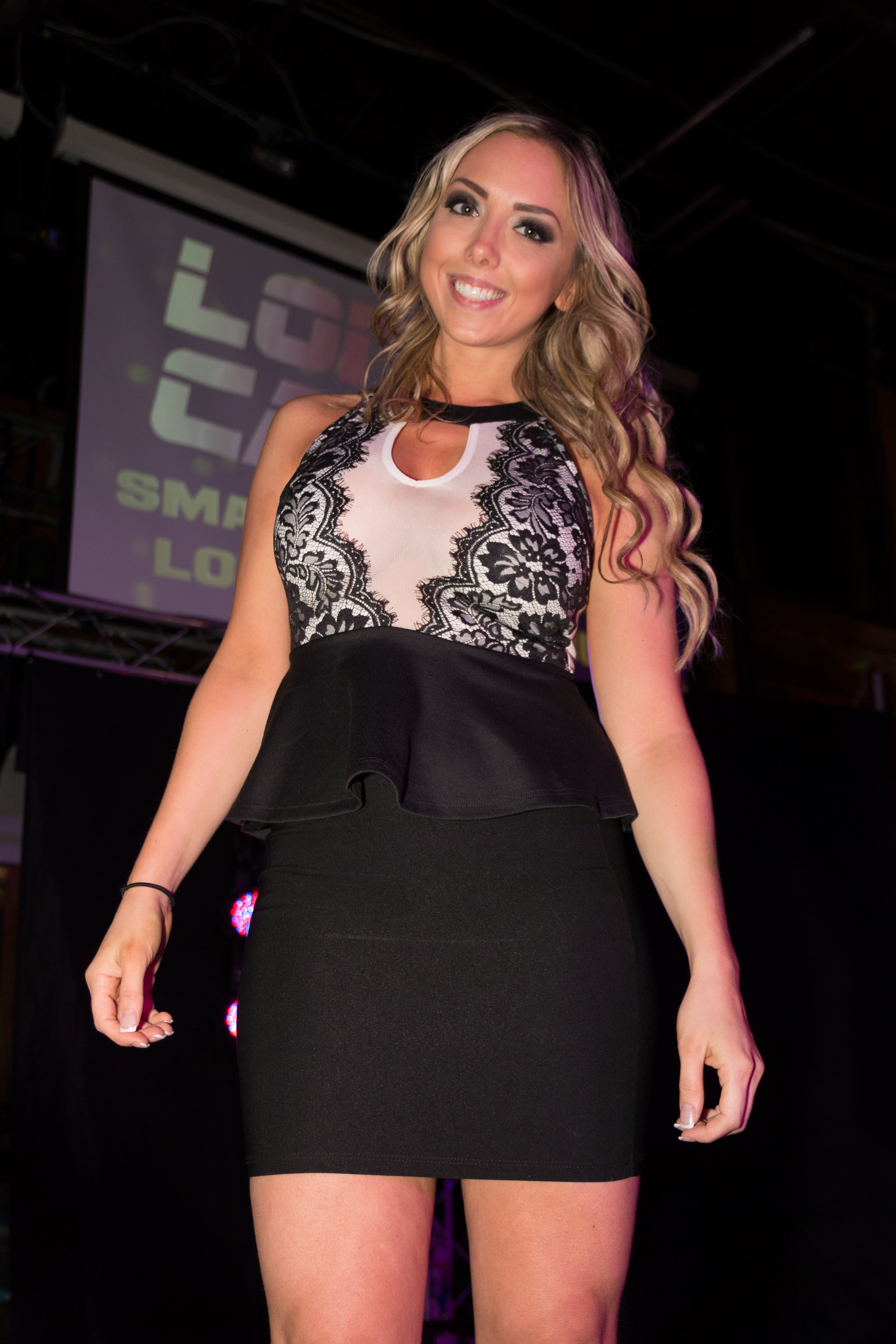
- Allie in 2015

Personal information
- Born: Laura Dennis; September 3, 1987 (age 39) Toronto, Ontario, Canada
- Spouse: The Blade (m. 2013)

Professional wrestling career
- Ring name(s): Allie; The Bunny; Laura Dennis; Cherry Bomb
- Billed height: 5 ft 5 in (1.65 m)
- Billed weight: 119 lb (54 kg)
- Billed from: Toronto, Ontario, Canada
- Trained by: Rob Etcheverria, Derek Wylde
- Debut: May 15, 2005

Laura Dennis (born September 3, 1987) is a Canadian professional wrestler. She is signed to Total Nonstop Action Wrestling (TNA), where she performs under the ring name Allie and is a member of DemonXBunny, alongside Rosemary

She is known for her time in All Elite Wrestling (AEW) from 2019 to 2023, where she performed under the ring name The Bunny. She has also competed for Great Canadian Wrestling, NCW Femmes Fatales, Shimmer Women Athletes, Shine Wrestling, Women Superstars Uncensored (WSU) and Combat Zone Wrestling (CZW) under the ring name Cherry Bomb. With tag team partner Kimber Lee, collectively known as The Kimber Bombs, they have held the Shine Tag Team Championship and the Shimmer Tag Team Championship both once. She is also a former one-time WSU Champion.

== Professional wrestling career ==
=== Canadian promotions (2005–2016) ===
On her seventeenth birthday, Dennis signed up to begin training at the Squared Circle Training centre based in Toronto, Ontario, with Rob Etcheverria. Etchevaria named her Cherry Bomb, and she began wrestling under the name. She later trained with Derek Wylde. She debuted in May 2005 in Oshawa, Ontario.

Cherry Bomb debuted for the Pure Wrestling Association (PWA) in a match with 21st Century Fox on July 22, 2005. She competed in the Elite 8 Tournament, but was eliminated by Danyah Rivietz in the first round. Later in the night, she aligned with Kristal Banks only to lose to the tag team of Tiana Ringer and Luscious Lily. She scored her very first victory against 21st Century Fox at a PWX event. In January 2006, Cherry Bomb lost to 21st Century Fox in a match to determine the inaugural PWA Elite Women's Champion.

She appeared for Ottawan promotion, Capital City Championship Combat, in 2008. Cherry Bomb also wrestled for Classic Championship Wrestling (CCW), and once held their Women's Championship, which she successfully defended against Evilyn, Alexxis, and Jaime D.

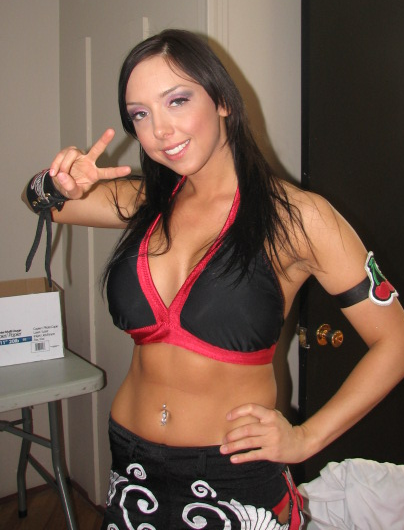
Cherry Bomb in 2011

Cherry Bomb was part of the debut show of NCW Femmes Fatales on September 5, 2009, where she lost to Sara Del Rey. She gained her first victory in the promotion on February 6, 2010, when she defeated Mistress Belmont. She was scheduled to wrestle against Daffney at NCW Femmes Fatales' third show, but was unable to make the show. At Femmes Fatales IX on July 7, 2012, Cherry Bomb and Sweet Cherrie unsuccessfully challenged The Canadian NINJAs (Portia Perez and Nicole Matthews) for the Shimmer Tag Team Championship. After the match, Cherry Bomb attacked Sweet Cherrie, blaming her for the loss.

On May 1, 2006, Cherry Bomb debuted in Great Canadian Wrestling (GCW), quickly associating herself with Jake O'Reilly, whom she began managing. In 2006, Cherry Bomb wrestled at the Super Hardcore Anime Wrestling Expo show, a combination of the 10th Annual Anime North Convention and GCW's Great Canadian Wrestling Expo show, where she teamed with LuFisto and Darkston as Team Sailor Moon to defeat Team Rocket (Timothy Dalton, Pandora and Steve Brown). She competed in the tournament to determine the inaugural GCW W.I.L.D. Champion on November 18, 2006, and defeated Portia Perez in the first round before losing to Sirelda, the eventual winner of the tournament, in the semi-finals. She continued competing in GCW throughout early 2007, teaming up with Hayden the Destroyer to defeat Cody Deaner and Portia Perez at New Year's Evil on January 12, and teaming with Sirelda to gain a victory over Deanna Conda and Aurora on April 13. The following night, on April 14, she won the W.I.L.D. Championship by defeating the reigning champion, April Hunter, Hailey Rogers, and Miss Danyah in a fatal four-way match at the Anarchy in Angus show. She successfully defended the championship by defeating the Southside Stranglerette by disqualification, and held the championship for just over two months, before she was defeated by Miss Danyah at Random Acts of Violence on June 22. On September 7, 2007, Cherry Bomb suffered a neck injury during a victory over Danyah. The injury forced her to take a nine-month hiatus from wrestling.

=== Shimmer Women Athletes (2008–2016) ===
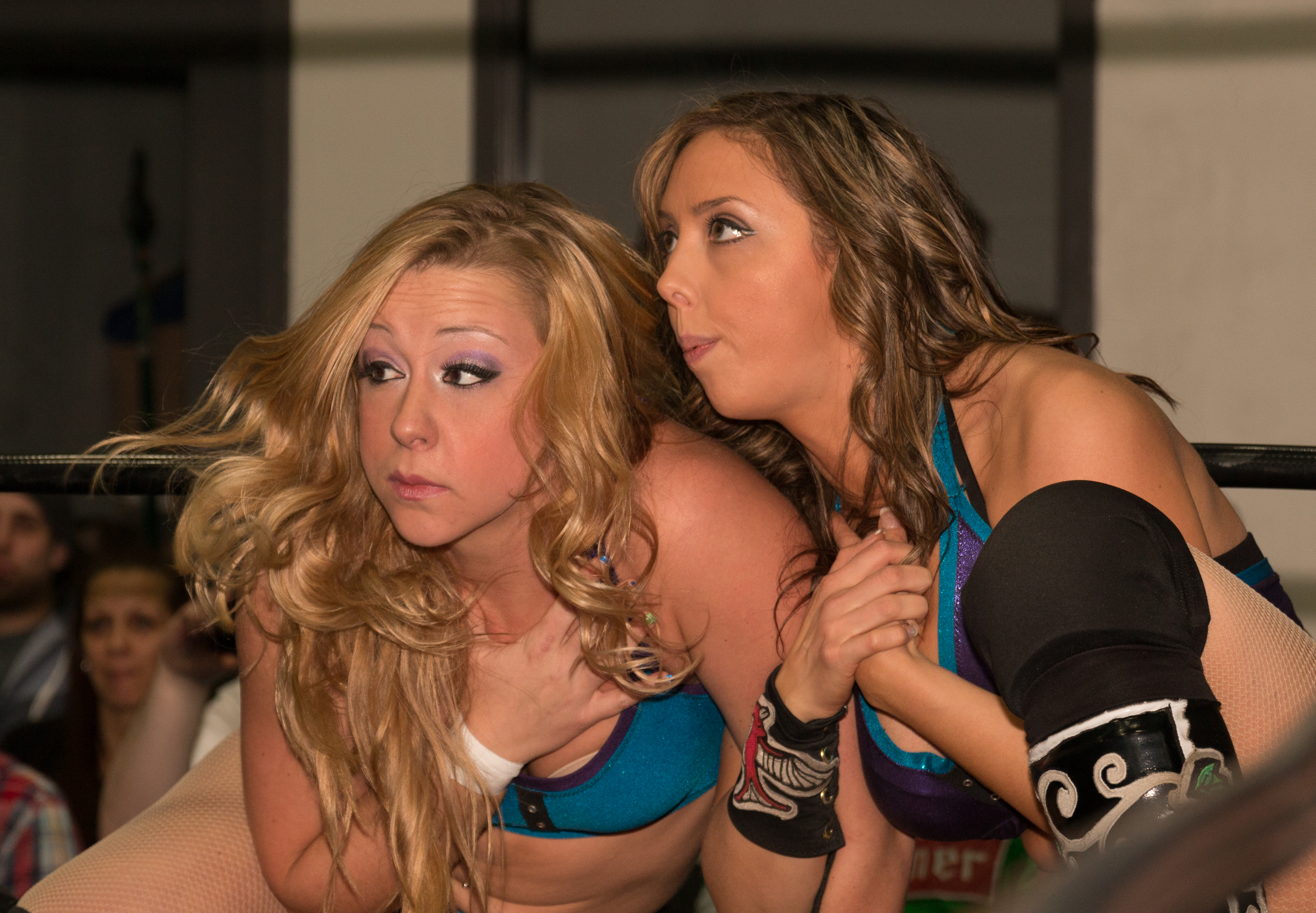
The Kimber Bombs: Kimber Lee, left, and Cherry Bomb in 2014

Cherry Bomb had her first match for Shimmer Women Athletes as part of the SPARKLE Division, losing a match against Melanie Cruise on October 19, 2008. She later formed a regular tag team with Kimber Lee in Shimmer, briefly called Team Combat Zone before being renamed The Kimber Bombs. In October 2013, the Kimber Bombs unsuccessfully challenged 3G (Kellie Skater and Tomoka Nakagawa) for the Shimmer Tag Team Championship. Throughout 2014, The Kimber Bombs continued to compete in Shimmer's tag team division against teams including Leva Bates and Veda Scott, Ray and Leon, Bambi Hall, and KC Cassidy, and The Buddy System (Heidi Lovelace and Solo Darling). On April 11, 2015, The Kimber Bombs defeated 3G to win the Shimmer Tag Team Championship. They lost the title to Evie and Heidi Lovelace on June 26, 2016.

=== Other promotions (2010–2017) ===
In June 2010, Cherry Bomb debuted for Women Superstars Uncensored (WSU), where she lost to Daizee Haze. She won the WSU Championship on May 9, 2015, by defeating reigning champion LuFisto.

Dennis was invited for a try-out match with World Wrestling Entertainment (WWE) at the May 17, 2010, episode of Raw, and she appeared in a segment with Goldust during the show. In March 2011, Dennis attended a try-out camp at Florida Championship Wrestling, WWE's then-developmental territory.

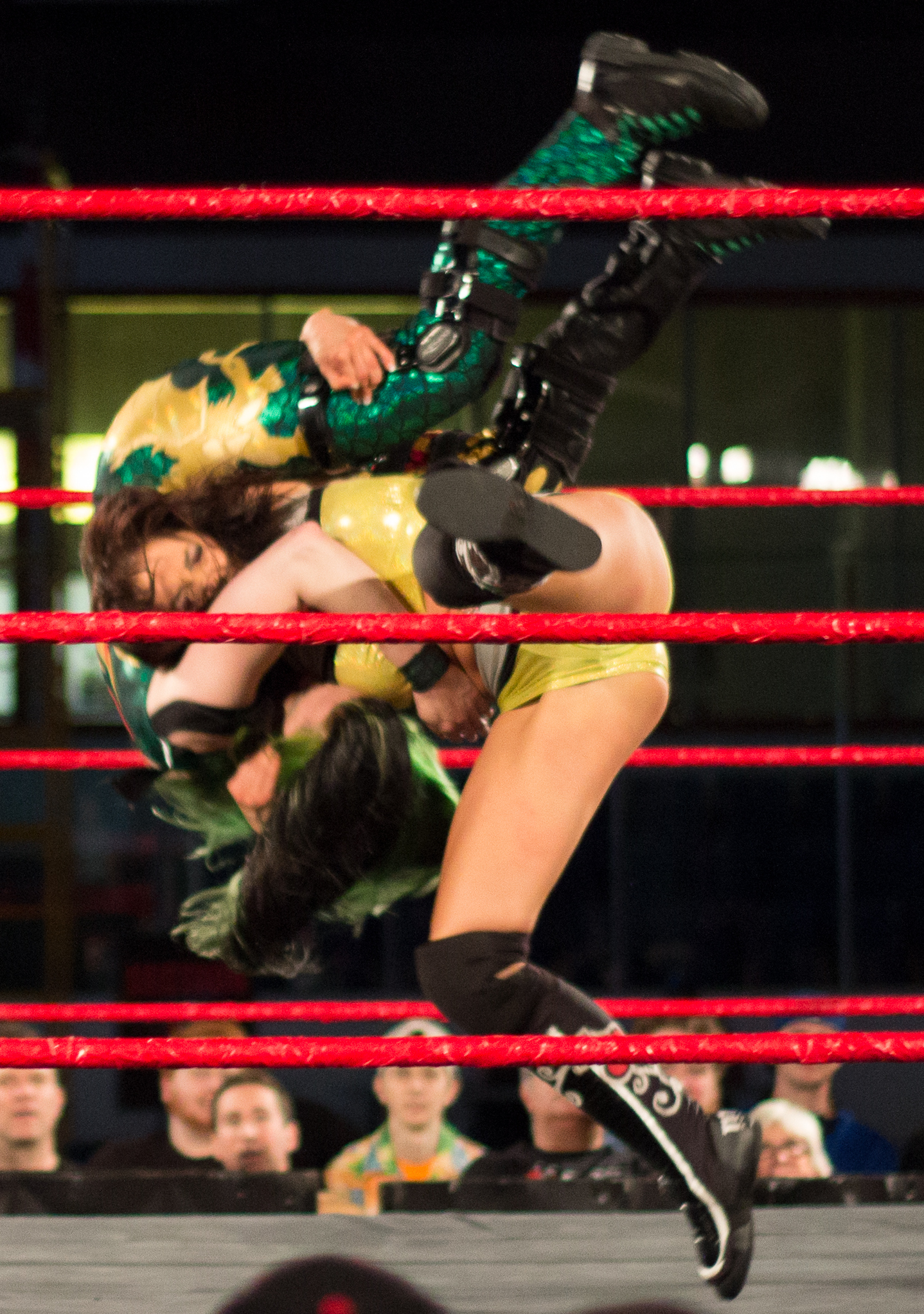
Cherry Bomb executing a DVD on MsChif during a Ring of Honor taping.

In 2013, Cherry Bomb began wrestling for Ring of Honor, appearing at the Ring of Honor Wrestling television tapings on March 3 and April 5. Her debut match for the promotion resulted in a loss in a four-way match against MsChif, Athena, and Scarlett Bordeaux. She won her second bout, a singles match against MsChif in May.

Under her 'Allie' ring name, it was announced that she would be making her debut for the Lucha Libre AAA Worldwide promotion by taking part in the Lucha Libre World Cup (2016) Women's Division Tournament. She would be a part of 'Team Canada' alongside fellow Canadians KC Spinelli, and the AAA Reina de Reinas Champion at the time, Taya.

=== Japanese promotions (2010, 2012) ===
Cherry Bomb toured Japan in November 2010. She teamed with Sexy Star and Madison Eagles in a loss to Hailey Hatred, Yoshiko Tamura, and Makoto. She then appeared at a Super FMW show, teaming with Sexy Star again to defeat Senri Kuroki and Kaori Yoneyama. Cherry Bomb returned to Japan in July 2012, and on July 28 made her debut for the Ice Ribbon promotion with a win over Kurumi. At the following day's Kaientai Dojo and Reina X World co-promoted event, Cherry Bomb teamed with Aki Kanbayashi to defeat Alex Lee and Bambi in a tag team match.

=== Shine Wrestling (2012–2016) ===
In July 2012, Cherry Bomb debuted for Shine Wrestling at their inaugural show, where she lost to Christina Von Eerie. She returned to the promotion in February 2014, where The Kimber Bombs participated in the tournament to determine the inaugural Shine Tag Team Champions; they were eliminated in the first round by eventual winners The Lucha Sisters (Leva Bates and Mia Yim). The Kimber Bombs continued to compete in tag team competition, defeating the S-N-S Express (Sassy Stephie and Jessie Belle Smothers) at Shine 21, and at Shine 23, they unsuccessfully challenged Legendary (Malia Hosaka and Brandi Wine) for the Shine Tag Team Championship. In a rematch at Shine 25, The Kimber Bombs won the championship. On October 2, at Shine 30, The Kimber Bombs were stripped of the title by Lexie Fyfe, due to Cherry Bomb's knee injury.

=== Combat Zone Wrestling (2012–2016) ===
Cherry Bomb began appearing for Combat Zone Wrestling (CZW) in late 2012, alongside her real-life boyfriend Pepper Parks. She lost her debut match for the promotion to Nevaeh at Cerebral in October 2012. Cherry Bomb and Parks quickly became villainous characters known as the "fitness power couple", doling out fitness and health advice to the audience. They defeated Greg Excellent and Candice LeRae in a mixed tag team match at Down with the Sickness 2013, after Cherry Bomb attacked Excellent with a kettle bell. Cherry Bomb and Parks continued to feud with Excellent in late 2013, which resulted in Cherry Bomb being forced to conform to Excellent's lifestyle, a distinct contrast to Cherry Bomb and Parks' fitness power couple gimmick. On March 8, 2014, at CZW's High Stakes internet pay-per-view, Parks defeated Excellent to "win back" Cherry Bomb.

In 2015, Cherry Bomb and Parks would align themselves with BLK Jeez, forming the villainous stable known as TV Ready. On December 12 at CZW's seventeenth annual Cage of Death event, TV Ready would go on to win the CZW World Tag Team Championship, defeating Dan Barry and Sozio. On May 14, 2016, TV Ready lost the CZW World Tag Team Championship to Da Hit Squad at Prelude to Violence 2016, the match would also be Cherry Bomb and Parks' final appearance for CZW after signing with Total Nonstop Action Wrestling.

On September 10, 2016, Cherry Bomb returned to CZW to accompany her husband Pepper Parks and BLK Jeez to the ring, as TV Ready challenged Da Hit Squad for the CZW World Tag Team Championship, in a losing effort.

=== Impact Wrestling (2013–2019) ===
==== Early appearances (2013–2015) ====
Dennis initially appeared for TNA in the year of 2013 on the December 5 edition of Impact Wrestling in a squash match, losing to Gail Kim.

Two years later in the year of 2015, Dennis appeared for TNA again under her real name on February 14 through the company's One Night Only PPV Knockouts Knockdown 2015 in a match against Gail Kim, once again in a losing effort. Dennis returned to TNA on the TKO: Night of Knockouts edition of Impact Wrestling on April 24, where she defeated Jade but won by disqualification.

==== The Lady Squad (2016–2017) ====
On March 23, 2016, Dennis signed a contract with TNA. She was given the new ring name Allie and aligned herself with Maria and Sienna after Allie revealed that she is Maria's apprentice, establishing herself as a heel in the process. A few weeks after her signing, Allie teamed up with Sienna and lost to Gail Kim and Jade in a tag team match.

On August 25, 2016, during a special Turning Point edition of Impact Wrestling, Allie turned face and won the TNA Knockouts Championship in a five–way match against the champion Sienna, Madison Rayne, Marti Bell and Jade. Allie would unknowingly pin Madison after being knocked out by Marti Bell with a baton, winning the Knockouts Championship. On the September 1 Impact, Allie dropped the title to Maria after she was forced to lie down, gaining sympathy from the crowd in the process. A few weeks later, Allie was attacked by Laurel Van Ness, which lead into a match between the two. On the October 27 episode of Impact Wrestling, Allie faced her first singles match against Van Ness in a losing effort.

In the following week, Allie was forced to dress as a pilgrim where she hit Maria with a pumpkin pie. On the December 2 episode of Impact Wrestling, Allie was again attacked by Van Ness after she slapped Maria in the face which led to a match between both of them on the December 9 episode of Impact Wrestling, where Allie revealed her to be "training" with Braxton Sutter, before subsequently winning the match. On the January 5, 2017, episode of Impact Wrestling, Allie faced Sienna where she lost due to interference from Van Ness. On the January 12, 2017, episode of Impact Wrestling, Allie assisted Sutter in getting a victory over Mike Bennett, thus entering him into her feud with Maria. On the February 23, 2017, episode of Impact Wrestling, Allie was forced to be the ring bearer for the wedding of Braxton Sutter (who is Allie's real-life husband) and Van Ness, which ended abruptly, when Sutter rejected the wedding and professed his love for Allie. The following week on Impact Wrestling, Maria went to fire Allie, but she responded by quitting, ending their feud after Maria left the company.

==== Various storylines (2017–2018) ====
Throughout early 2017, Allie continued her on screen relationship with Sutter, accompanying him to his matches and vice versa. On the May 25 episode of Impact Wrestling, Laurel Van Ness and Sienna would jump Allie, prompting Rosemary to return and save her. Rosemary later explained that "the hive" sent her to protect Allie, beginning an alliance between the two. On the June 8 episode, Allie came out and saved Rosemary from being attacked by Sienna and Van Ness, fending them off with a kendo stick. At Slammiversary, Allie would make an appearance as she chased Van Ness away again with a kendo stick, saving Rosemary from interference during the championship match against Sienna. On August 31, 2017, episode of GFW Impact Wrestling, Allie was attacked by Taryn Terrell backstage which lead into a tag team match between the four. At Bound for Glory, Allie competed in a Three-way match for the Impact Knockouts Championship but failed to win the title. During the second half of 2017, Allie and Braxton Sutter ended their on camera relationship without any explanation. However during a January 2018 episode of Impact (which aired March 1, 2018), Sutter made his return to Impact television, where he turned heel and revealed that he dropped Allie like "a bad habit." Also in January 2018, she defeated Van Ness to become Knockouts Champion for the second time. (again, the episode did not air until March 2018, even though it was filmed in January) Allie successfully defended her title against Sienna on the March 22 episode of Impact Wrestling. After the match, Sutter proposed to Allie, only to provide distraction for Su Yung to attack Allie. This led into a title match between the two at Redemption, when Allie successfully retained her title over Yung. On the April 26 episode of Impact!, Allie had another successful title defense against Taya Valkyrie. After the match, Allie was attacked by Yung, and was saved by Rosemary.

==== Dark Allie (2018–2019) ====
On the May 3 episode of Impact!, after Rosemary was defeated by Su Yung and buried in a coffin that Su Yung set alight, promos showed Allie channeling Rosemary's spirit through her, dressing like Rosemary and stating that she was ready to get her revenge on Su Yung for what she did to her best friend. At Under Pressure, Allie lost the Knockout's Championship to Su Yung in a Last Rites match. At Slammiversary XVI, Allie lost to Tessa Blanchard. On August 30 episode of Impact! ReDefined, Allie unsuccessfully challenged Yung for the title in a three–way match, which was won by Tessa Blanchard. At Bound for Glory, Allie entered into the Undead Realm, when she rescued Kiera Hogan from Yung and her undead bridesmaids. When both left the Undead Realm, Allie appeared to be possessed. Following the next couple of months, Allie showed a darker and villainous version of herself. She aligned herself with Yung and turned on her friend Hogan under possession thus turning heel. At Homecoming, Allie and Su Yung defeated Jordynne Grace and Kiera Hogan. On March 8 episode, Team Rosemary defeated Team Su Yung, putting Allie in the possession of Rosemary. On the March 29 episode of Impact Wrestling, Allie was shown "dying" in Rosemary's arms, officially writing off her television character. On March 23, 2019, Impact decided not to renew her contract and she left the company.

=== All Elite Wrestling (2019–2023) ===
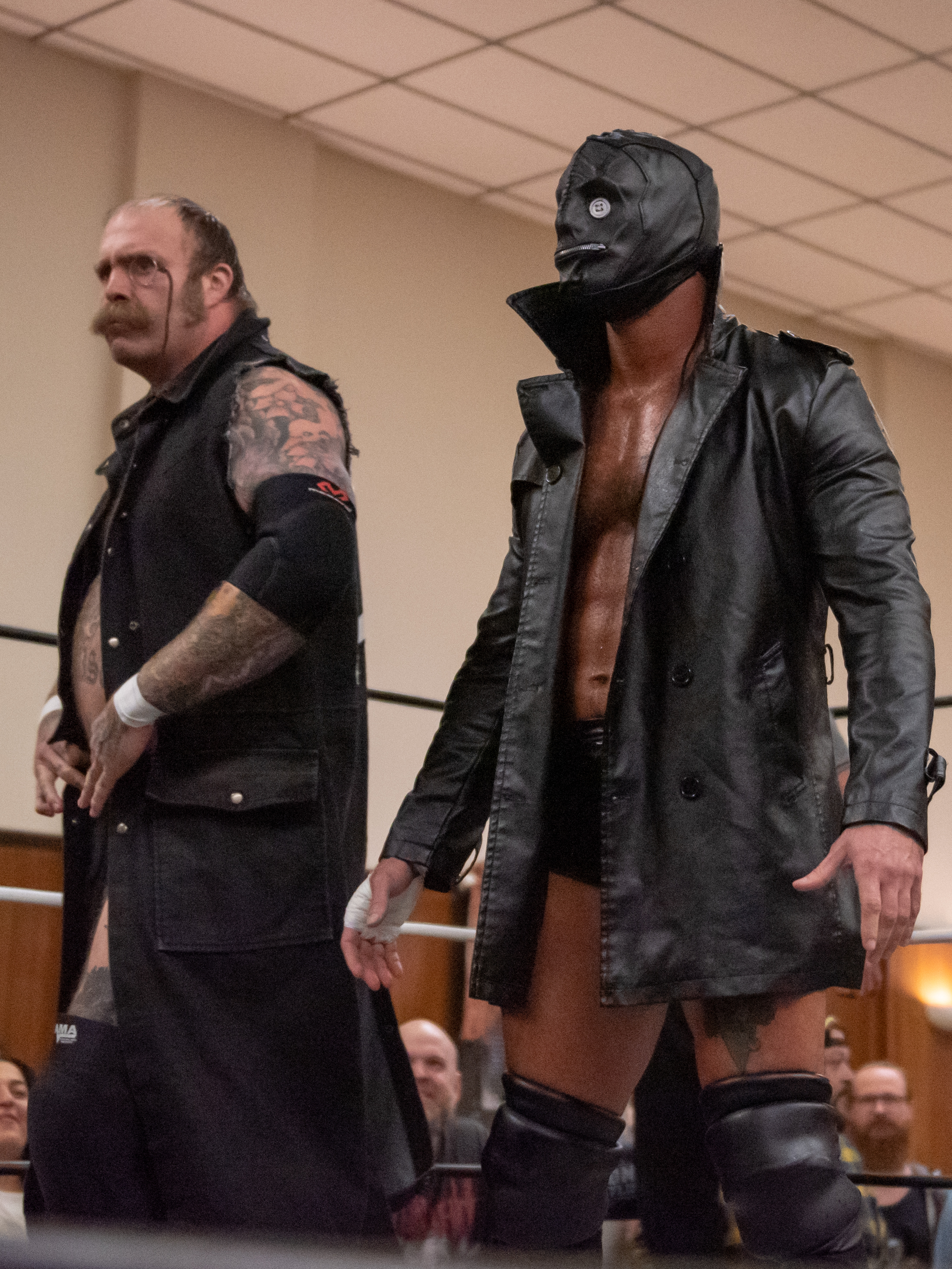
During her time in AEW, Dennis performed as "the Bunny" and primarily managed The Butcher and the Blade tag team. The Blade (right) is Dennis' husband Jesse Guilmette.

It was announced on the March 21, 2019, edition of "Road to Double or Nothing" that Allie had signed with All Elite Wrestling (AEW). She debuted at Fyter Fest, defeating Leva Bates after a superkick. At Fight for the Fallen, she was defeated by Brandi Rhodes. Allie also was part of the AEW Women's Casino Battle Royal at All Out getting eliminated at number 16 by eventual winner Nyla Rose after working with Britt Baker to eliminate Rhodes.

On the November 27 episode of AEW Dynamite, Allie debuted a variation of her "Dark Allie" character The Bunny appearing as a manager/valet for her husband The Blade and his partner The Butcher by making an entrance via a hole in the mat of the ring and attacking Cody, turning heel in the process. In May 2020, Allie ceased appearing with The Butcher and The Blade and began a romantic storyline with Q. T. Marshall, thus turning face in the process. On the June 2 episode of AEW Dark, Allie arrived with Marshall to the arena in a corvette and accompanied him to the ring for his match to Brandi and Dustin Rhodes's behest. After a couple of months of managing Marshall and Rhodes, Allie returned to in-ring competition on the June 16 episode of AEW Dark, by teaming with Brandi Rhodes and defeating the team of Kenzie Paige and Red Velvet. Allie and Brandi, now known as "The Nightmare Sisters", entered the Women's Tag Team Cup Tournament, which started on August 3. The Nightmare Sisters advanced to the final, when they were defeated by the team of Diamante and Ivelisse.

On the October 20 episode of AEW Dark, Allie turned heel once again when she returned as The Bunny and aligned with Eddie Kingston's stable, betraying Marshall during his match against Pentagón Jr. On August 4, 2021, at Homecoming, The Bunny was defeated by Leyla Hirsch in a match to determine the challenger for the NWA World Women's Championship at NWA EmPowerrr. On the November 5 episode of AEW Rampage, The Bunny took part in the AEW TBS Championship Tournament where she faced Red Velvet in the first round and lost. After months of feuding, the Bunny teamed up with Penelope Ford to take on Anna Jay and Tay Conti in a street fight on the December 31 episode of Rampage, which they lost. On February 23, 2022, The Bunny faced Jade Cargill on Dynamite for the TBS Championship which The Bunny lost. On March 30 on Dynamite, The Bunny took part in the AEW Owen Hart Cup where she faced Toni Storm and lost.

On February 8, 2023, special episode of Dynamite named Championship Fight Night, The Bunny faced the AEW Women's World Champion Jamie Hayter in a Championship Eliminator match. During the match, The Bunny was reportedly injured, which was later confirmed on June by The Butcher that The Bunny sustained a broken orbital bone. Bunny was removed from AEW’s website roster on November 9, 2023, after both parties mutually agreed to part ways ending her 4 year tenure with the company.

=== Return to Total Nonstop Action Wrestling (2025–present) ===
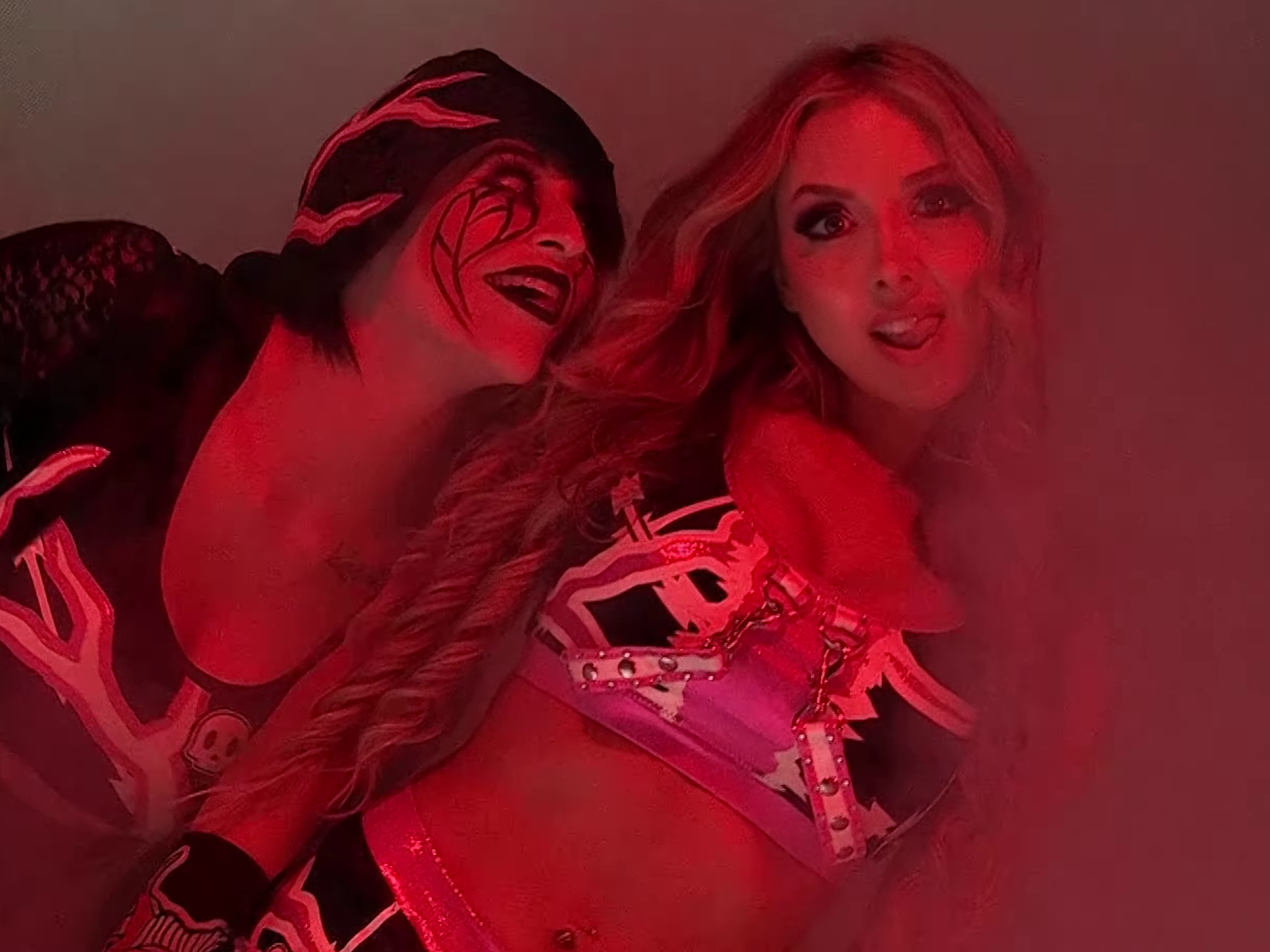
Allie is one-half of RoseXBunny with Rosemary (left).

Allie returned to Total Nonstop Action Wrestling (TNA; formerly Impact Wrestling) on May 25, 2025 at Border Brawl as the coach for Team Canada. On the March 12, 2026 episode of Impact!, Allie returned to TNA in a vignette with Rosemary. On the April 30 episode of Impact!, Allie had her first match in TNA since 2019, where, alongside Mara Sadè and Rosemary, defeated The Diamond Collective (Mila Moore, Tessa Blanchard, and Victoria Crawford). On June 28 at Slammiversary, she and Rosemary defeated The Elegance Brand (Heather by Elegance and M by Elegance) to win the TNA Knockouts World Tag Team Championship. After Slammiversary, Rosemary would suffer an injury. On August 23 at Lockdown, Allie teamed with a returning Kiera Hogan to defeat The Elegance Brand (Heather by Elegance and M by Elegance) to retain the TNA Knockouts World Tag Team Championship. At Bound for Glory on October 11, Allie and Hogan lost the titles to Apex (Shayna Baszler and Zoey Serrano). On the October 22 episode of Impact!, Hogan turned on Allie by attacking her alongside Tasha Steelz, only for Allie to be saved by a debuting Shotzi Blackheart.

== Professional wrestling style and persona ==
Her Bunny character takes inspiration from Baby (from House of 1000 Corpses and The Devil's Rejects), Katherine Pierce (from The Vampire Diaries) and the movie The Strangers.

== Other media ==
Allie

Twitch information
- Channel: alliewrestling
- Years active: 2020–present
- Genre: Gaming
- Followers: 13 thousand
- Last updated: April 28, 2024

Dennis posed for the 2010 Nearly Naked Ladies of Wrestling Calendar, which was set up in aid of the Canadian Breast Cancer Foundation. She appears as herself in the 2011 independent film Beat Down.

== Personal life ==
On September 21, 2013, Dennis married American professional wrestler Jesse Guilmette, better known under the ring names Pepper Parks, Braxton Sutter, and The Blade. She has been a vegetarian for ethical reasons since she was 14 years old, and a vegan since late 2014. Dennis was once a long term London, Ontario, resident, and as a result it is often mistakenly believed to be her birthplace.

== Filmography ==
Film

Year	Title	Role	Notes
2012	Beat Down	Cherry Bomb	
2020	Givers of Death	Girlfriend	
2022	Puppet Master: Doktor Death	Rebecca	Short film
2024	Roommate Regret	Axelle	
2024	My Nanny Stole My Life	Rachel	
2024	Barbie & Kendra Crash Joe Bob’s Drive-In Jamboree!	The Bunny	Short film

Television

Year	Title	Role	Notes
2022	Hey! (EW)	Herself	

== Championships and accomplishments ==
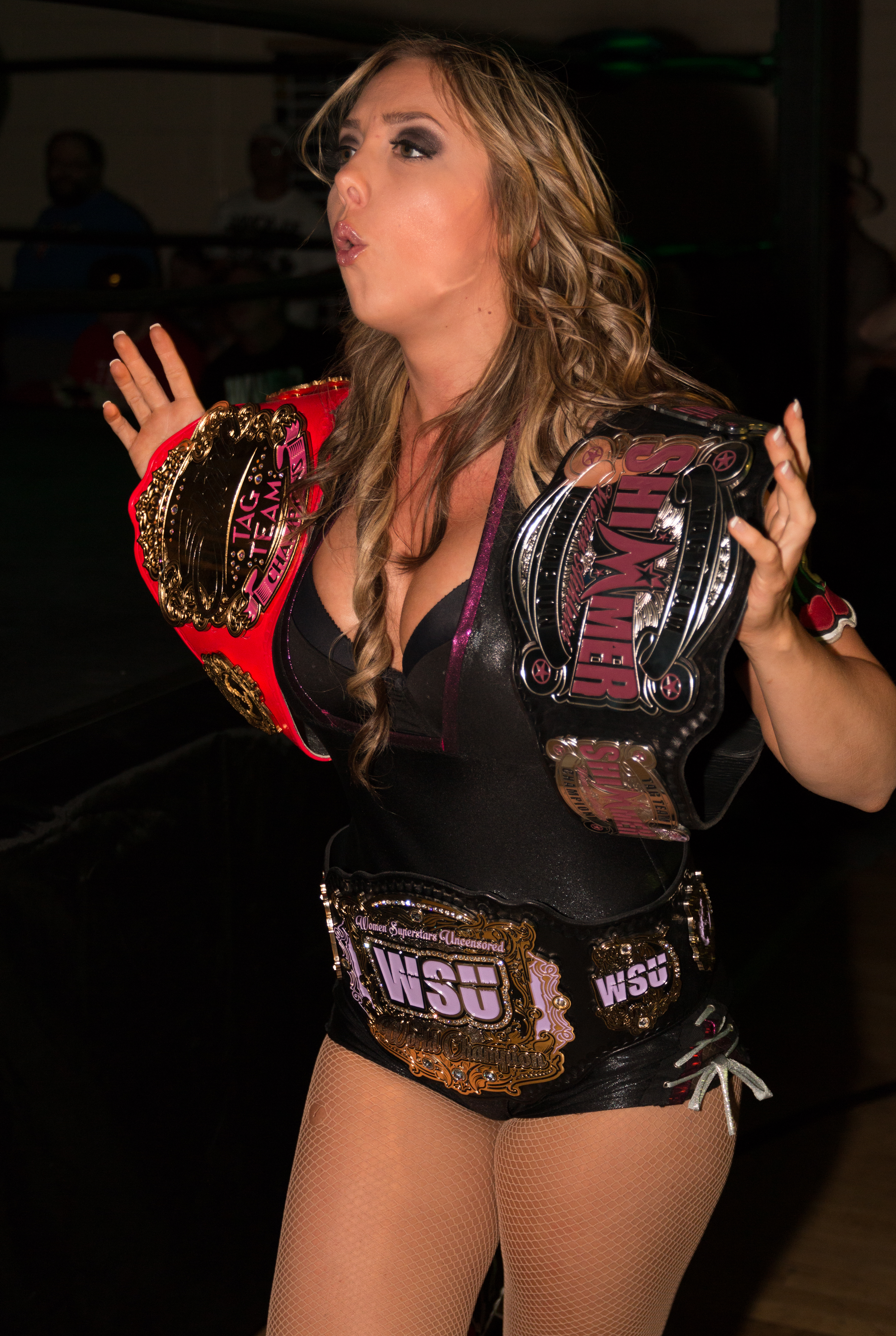
Cherry Bomb with the WSU Championship belt around her waist, the Shimmer Tag Team Championship belt on her left shoulder, and the Shine Tag Team Championship on her right shoulder.

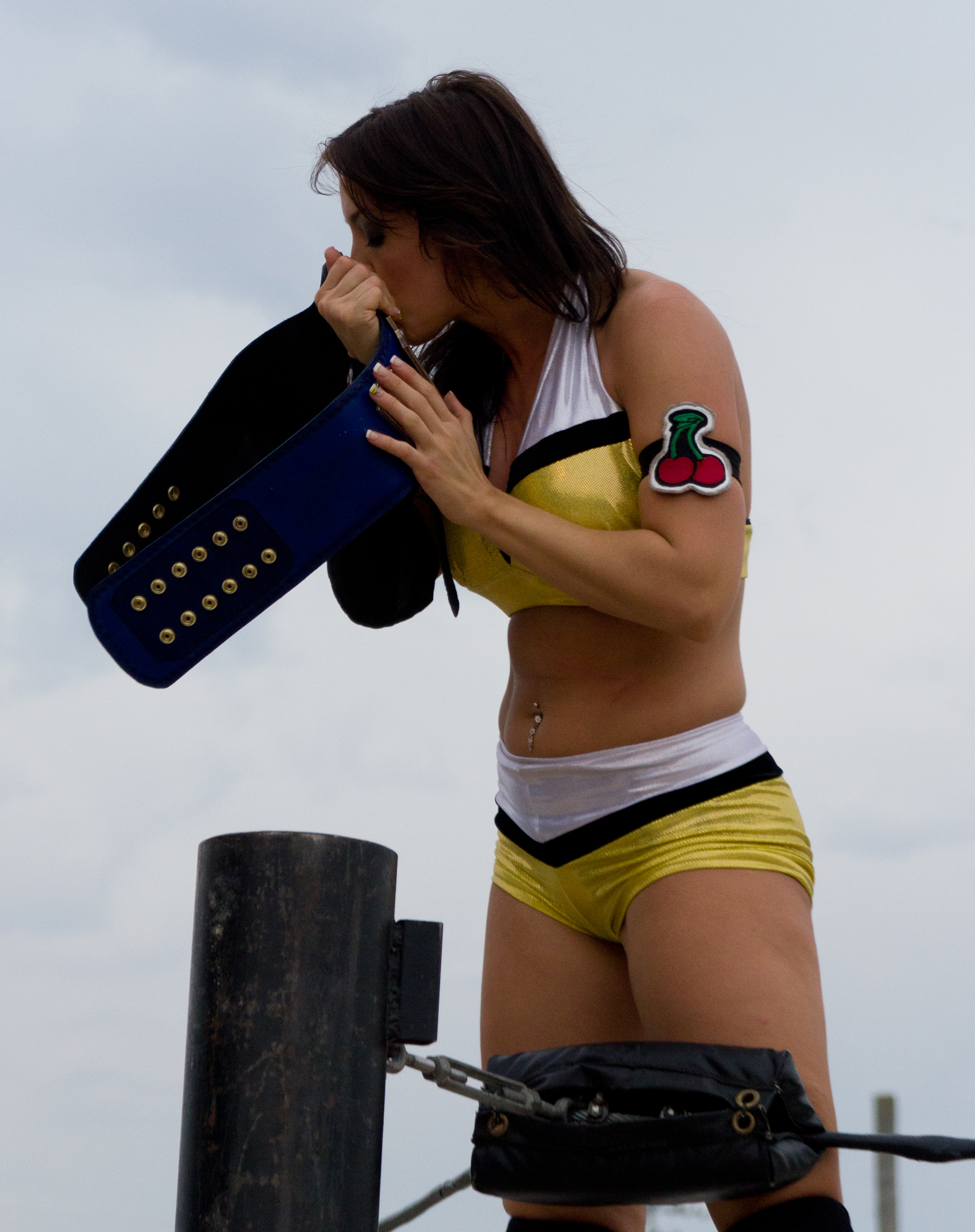
Cherry Bomb as the CCW Women's Champion.

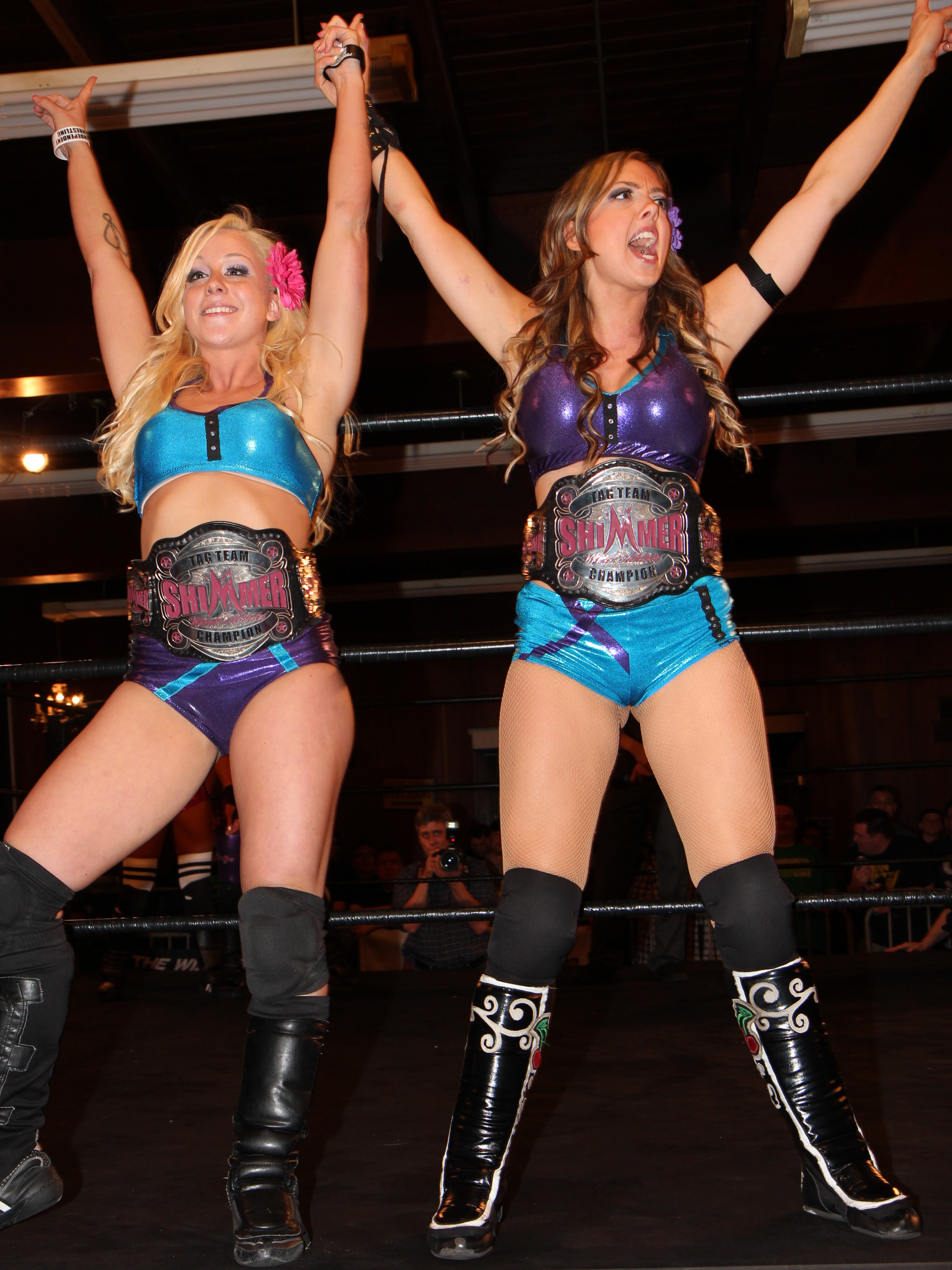
Alongside Kimber Lee, Cherry Bomb captured the Shimmer Tag Team Championship in 2015

- All Elite Wrestling
  - AEW Dynamite Awards (1 time)
    - Biggest WTF Moment (2022) – TayJay (Anna Jay and Tay Conti) vs. The Bunny and Penelope Ford in a Street Fight on New's Year Smash (December 31)
- Classic Championship Wrestling
  - CCW Women's Championship (2 times)
- Great Canadian Wrestling
  - W.I.L.D. Champion (1 time)
- Ontario Indy Wrestling Awards
  - Female Wrestler of the Year (2009)
- Pro Wrestling Illustrated
  - Ranked No. 8 of the top 50 female wrestlers in the PWI Female 50 in 2015
  - Ranked No. 17 of the top 100 female singles wrestlers in the PWI Women's 100 in 2019
- Pro Wrestling Xtreme
  - PWX Women's Champion (1 time)
- Shimmer Women Athletes
  - Shimmer Tag Team Championship (1 time) – with Kimber Lee
- Shine Wrestling
  - Shine Tag Team Championship (1 time) – with Kimber Lee
- Squared Circle Wrestling
  - Girls Grand Prix 2 (2013)
- Total Nonstop Action Wrestling / Impact Wrestling
  - TNA/Impact Knockouts Championship (2 times)
  - TNA Knockouts World Tag Team Championship (1 time) – with Rosemary and Kiera Hogan
  - Gravy Train Turkey Trot (2017) – with Eddie Edwards, Richard Justice, Fallah Bahh, and Garza Jr.
- Rise Wrestling
  - Rise Year End Awards (1 time)
    - Moment of the Year (2019) Allie returning as Cherry Bomb to face off Rosemary at RISE 13: Legendary
- Women Superstars Uncensored
  - WSU Championship (1 time)

== See also ==
- List of vegans
