= Danyah =

Canadian professional wrestler

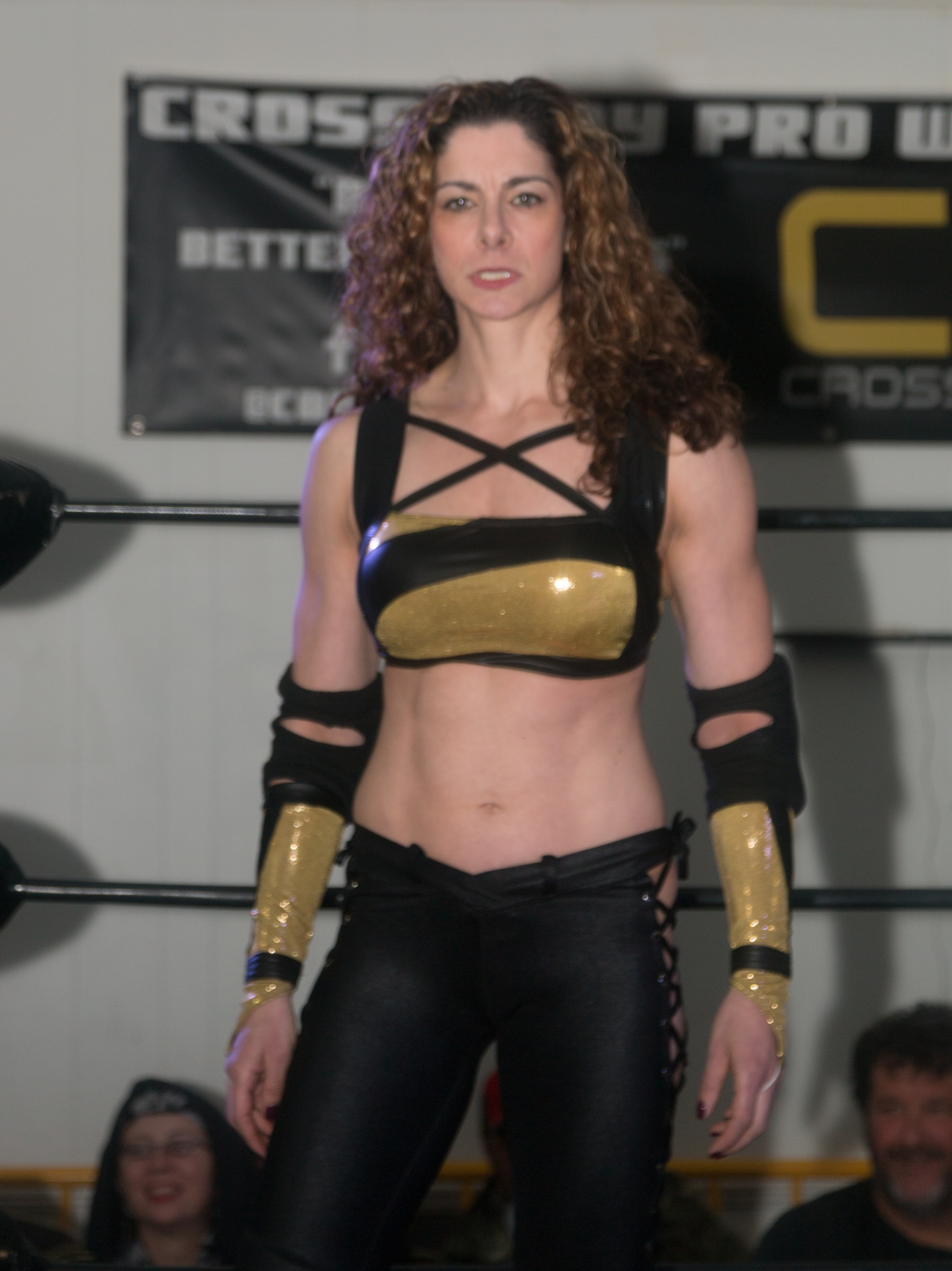
- Danyah in 2017

Personal information
- Born: Danyah (Rivietz) Glanville; February 25 Toronto, Ontario, Canada

Professional wrestling career
- Ring name(s): Danyah; Miss Danyah; Danyah Rays; Alexandra the Great
- Billed height: 5 ft 9 in (1.75 m)
- Billed weight: 128 lb (58 kg)
- Billed from: Las Vegas, Nevada
- Trained by: Johnny Devine; Rob Fuego
- Debut: 2005

Danyah (Rivietz) Glanville, better known by her ring name Danyah, is a Canadian professional wrestler. She is best known for her work in Shimmer Women Athletes as well as all-women's promotions in America and Canada. Danyah is currently a fitness professional/fitness model, and competitive CrossFit athlete based out of Toronto, Ontario, Canada, and still wrestles on the side.

== Professional wrestling career ==
Following in the footsteps of Gail Kim and Traci Brooks, Danyah came to the wrestling business through the Squared Circle Pro Wrestling facility and the Devine Dungeon. Prior to her wrestling career she had a background in kickboxing and fitness.

She has wrestled well known wrestlers such as Nattie Neidhart, Gail Kim, and Traci Brooks. She also wrestles in Canada under the name Miss Danyah. Danyah was voted best female body in the wrestling business in PWI magazine in 2010 and 2011.

After missing the first show where she was scheduled to take on She Nay Nay Danyah will make her debut for NCW Femmes Fatales in a Fatal 4 Way also involving the debuting PJ Tyler, She Nay Nay and Addy Starr. Once again Danyah couldn't make it to NCW Femmes Fatales so the Fatal 4 Way got cancelled. She is now booked for the Third Show.

=== Shimmer Women Athletes ===
Danyah made her Shimmer Women Athletes debut as part of the opening match of Volume 17. She teamed with Jennifer Blake in a losing effort against Rain and Jetta. Later in the night on Volume 18 they lost to the team of Malia Hosaka and Lexie Fyfe. She competed in her first singles match on Volume 19 where she lost to the returning Serena Deeb. Later in the night on Volume 20 she also lost to Amazing Kong. She came back on Volume 21 in a losing effort to Nikki Roxx but was able to score the first victory against Cat Power as part of Volume 22. She was scheduled to take part at the May 2009 tapings of Volumes 23 to 26, but was unable to get there due to travelling issues.

=== Wrestlicious ===
Rivietz portrayed Polish powerhouse Alexandra the Great in season 1 of Jimmy Hart's Wrestlicious.

Alexandra made her in-ring debut facing Brooke Lynne in a winning effort via disqualification when Kickstart Katie attacked Alexandra. She was also one of the 20 wrestlers competing in the "Hoedown Throwdown" 20-girl battle royal to determine the two contenders for the Wrestlicious Takedown title. On the May 19 episode of Takedown, Alexandra faced Kickstart Katie in a submission match against. She ended up winning when Lacey Von Erich put Lynne in the Von Erich Claw to make her drop her towel and give Alexandra the victory over Katie. She was set to team up with Azizza against Amber Lively and Marley but claimed that Lacey Von Erich injured her during the course of the last match. They would be replaced by The Lunch Ladies.

== Championships and accomplishments ==
- Great Canadian Wrestling
  - GCW W.I.L.D. Championship (3 times)
- Pro Wrestling Illustrated
  - Ranked No. 36 of the best 50 female singles wrestlers in the PWI Female 50 in 2009
- Pro Wrestling Xtreme
  - PWX Women's Championship (1 time)
- Pure Wrestling Association
  - Elite 8 Cup (2007)

== CrossFit career ==
- Iron Force Athletics Athlete
- Competes in various local and regional competitions
