= Independent Wrestling Federation =

- Created by: Kevin Knight
- Opening theme: "Live To Win" by Paul Stanley
- Country of origin: United States
- No. of episodes: 399

Production
- Camera setup: Multicamera setup
- Running time: Approximately 2 hours per event

Original release
- Release: March 14, 1998 – 2017

The Independent Wrestling Federation (IWF) is a professional wrestling promotion based in Nutley, New Jersey. The IWF features upcoming talent, in some cases, which have made it to the World Wrestling Entertainment (WWE). Along with producing live events for the public, the IWF also gives youth clinics and acts as a wrestling school. The wrestling school trains teens and adults, and former WWE star Tito Santana is among the instructors.

IWF events occur weekly on Saturday nights. In most events, championship matches occur. Before each week's shows, the IWF website features their Eruption webcast which gives a preview of the upcoming show.

== Wrestling School ==
Established in 1999, IWF Wrestling School trains hundreds of wrestlers and managers from 16 states and six countries that perform in bouts around the globe. The IWF wrestling school has taught former many athletes, from former WWE wrestlers to teenagers. The wrestling school usually features clinics from former and current wrestling superstars. Tom Prichard, John Bradshaw Layfield, Tito Santana, Honky Tonk Man, Steven Richards, Nunzio, Ricky Steamboat, Ken Shamrock, Dawn Marie, Tom Brandi (Sal Sincere), Steve Corino, Jim Powers, Bushwhacker Luke and Simon Diamond have hosted clinics.

In addition to his role as an instructor, WWE Hall of Famer Tito Santana began wrestling with IFW in 2005. Santana, a two-time WWE Tag Team Champion, also held the IWF Tag Team Championship in the latter part of his career.

NXT graduate and former Raw performer Darren Young trained, graduated, and wrestled in the IWF. While wrestling for the IWF, he was known as "Bonecrusher" Fred Sampson. Other graduates of note include former Total Nonstop Action]] talent Rob Eckos (ring name Robbie E.), and current NXT General manager Robert Stone), who is also mentioned in the Darren Aronofsky film "The Wrestler", and "Pretty Boy" Moby Plinko, better known as music producer Keven Maroda. Eckos and Maroda trained together under Kevin Knight in 2000.

On April 30, 2014, the IWF Centre (Independent Wrestling Federation's school) relocated and opened in Nutley, NJ at a state-of-the-art 7,000 sq-ft facility with a new wrestling ring, padded amateur wrestling/MMA room, 3 dressing rooms, pro shop, nutrition store, and a private party room.

On June 26, 2017, the IWF held its last training school session.

== History ==
The Independent Wrestling Federation began in 1998, as a road show. The IWF traveled to local high schools and venues to perform live events. In 1999, the IWF moved into its current home in Nutley, New Jersey, known as the IWF Centre. The IWF CustomMuscle Centre houses not only the wrestling events, but also wrestling clinics, a training facility, and serves as a wrestling school.

At February Fury in 2009, Kevin Knight was beat for his IWF Heavyweight Title by Chris Steeler. This not only marked the first time the Ross Family held every title (excluding Junior Heavyweight), but Steeler became the first GrandSlam winner (has held every IWF Championship). Kevin Knight was able to win a 16-man battle royal to become number one contender for Steeler's title at March Madness. Steeler remained champion throughout the later events. The Heavyweight championships stayed on Steeler's waist for all of 2009 since winning the title in February. Chachi won the Tournament of Champions in December to win the vacant American Championship.

== Current champions ==
| Championship | Current Champion(s) | Date won | Days | Won from |
|---|---|---|---|---|
| IWF Heavyweight Champion | Biggie Biggs | April 14, 2018 | 3,012 | VACANT |
| IWF Junior Heavyweight Champion | Weasel | June 28, 2017 | 3,302 | "First Class" Justin Adams |
| IWF Tag Team Champions | Robert Atkins and Brian Atkins (The Atkins Brothers) | June 24, 2017 | 3,306 | Juan Vargas & Tony Graves |
| IWF American Champion | "First-Class" Justin Adams | June 24, 2017 | 3,306 | "Golden Boy" Michael Cammett |

== Current roster ==
| Wrestler | Notes |
|---|---|
| Biggie Biggs | |
| Benjamin T Asher | |
| Brian Atkins | IWF Tag Team Champion |
| Dark Oracle Sage | IWF Heavyweight Champion |
| Dracko | |
| Eloy Fiesta | |
| Jason Hendrix | |
| Jayden Stehle | |
| Justin Bongiovi | |
| Kareem West | |
| Kevin Knight | |
| KC Bonilla | |
| Mad Dawg Jenkins | |
| Robert Atkins | IWF Tag Team Champion |
| Shane O'Brien | |
| Tony Graves | |
| Weasel | IWF Junior Heavyweight Champion |
