= TNA Emergence =

Professional wrestling event series

Emergence
- Promotions: Total Nonstop Action Wrestling
- First event: Emergence (2020)
- Last event: Emergence (2025)

Emergence was a professional wrestling event produced by Total Nonstop Action Wrestling. The first event was held in 2020, and it was held annually during the month of August.

== History ==
Since of April 2020, due to the COVID-19 pandemic in the United States, Impact had to present the majority of its programming from a behind closed doors set at Skyway Studios in Nashville, Tennessee. The inaugural Emergence event took place on August 14, 2020, at the Skyway Studios, but aired on tape delay within two nights, with the first being on August 18, and the second on August 25. The second Emergence, which filmed on August 15–16, 2021, at the Skyway Studios, and aired on tape delay on August 20, saw the return of live attendance.

== Events ==
#	Event	Date	City	Venue	Main event	Ref.
1	Emergence (2020)	August 18, 2020 (Note: The event was taped on August 14, 2020.)	Nashville, Tennessee	Skyway Studios	The Motor City Machine Guns (Alex Shelley and Chris Sabin) (c) vs. The North (Ethan Page and Josh Alexander) for the Impact World Tag Team Championship	
1	Emergence (2020)	August 25, 2020	Nashville, Tennessee	Skyway Studios	Deonna Purrazzo (c) vs. Jordynne Grace in a 30-minute Iron Woman match for the Impact Knockouts Championship	
2	Emergence (2021)	August 20, 2021 (Note: The event was taped on August 15–16, 2021.)	Nashville, Tennessee	Skyway Studios	Christian Cage (c) vs. Brian Myers for the Impact World Championship	
3	Emergence (2022)	August 12, 2022	Chicago, Illinois	Cicero Stadium	Josh Alexander (c) vs. Alex Shelley for the Impact World Championship	
4	Emergence (2023)	August 27, 2023	Toronto, Ontario, Canada	Rebel Entertainment Complex	Trinity (c) vs. Deonna Purrazzo for the Impact Knockouts World Championship	
5	Emergence (2024)	August 30, 2024	Louisville, Kentucky	Old Forester’s Paristown Hall	Nic Nemeth (c) vs. Josh Alexander in a 60-minute Iron man match for the TNA World Championship	
6	Emergence (2025)	August 15, 2025	Baltimore, Maryland	Chesapeake Employers Insurance Arena	Trick Williams (c) vs. Moose for the TNA World Championship	
(c) – refers to the champion(s) heading into the match
