= TNA Emergence (2025) =

Professional wrestling event

Emergence
- Promotional poster
- Promotion: Total Nonstop Action Wrestling
- Date: August 15, 2025
- City: Baltimore, Maryland
- Venue: Chesapeake Employers Insurance Arena

TNA+ Monthly Specials chronology
← Previous; Against All Odds	Next → Victory Road

Emergence chronology
← Previous; 2024	Next → Last

The 2025 Emergence was a professional wrestling event produced by Total Nonstop Action Wrestling. It took place on August 15, 2025, at Chesapeake Employers Insurance Arena in Baltimore, Maryland, and will air on TNA+. It was the sixth event under the Emergence chronology. Wrestlers from WWE's NXT brand, with which TNA has a partnership, also appeared at the event.

Ten matches were contested at the event, including two on the Countdown to Emergence pre-show. In the main event, NXT wrestler Trick Williams defeated Moose to retain the TNA World Championship. In other prominent matches, The Hardys (Jeff Hardy and Matt Hardy) defeated The Rascalz (Zachary Wentz and Myron Reed) to retain the TNA World Tag Team Championship, Steve Maclin defeated Jake Something in a No Disqualification, No Countout match to retain the TNA International Championship, and in the opening bout, Leon Slater defeated Cedric Alexander to retain the TNA X Division Championship.

The event received positive reviews from critics, with much praise being directed to both the X Division and World title matches.

== Production ==
=== Background ===
Emergence is a professional wrestling event produced by Total Nonstop Action Wrestling (TNA). The first event was held in 2020, and it is annually held during the month of August. On June 26, 2025, it was announced that the 2025 Emergence would take place on August 15, 2025, at the Chesapeake Employers Insurance Arena in Baltimore, Maryland.

=== Storylines ===
The event will feature several professional wrestling matches that involved different wrestlers from pre-existing scripted feuds, plots, and storylines. Wrestlers portray heroes, villains, or less distinguishable characters in scripted events that build tension and culminate in a wrestling match or series of matches. Storylines are produced on TNA's weekly programs, Impact! and Xplosion.

At Slammiversary, The Nemeths (Nic Nemeth and Ryan Nemeth) lost their TNA World Tag Team Championship to The Hardys (Matt Hardy and Jeff Hardy in a four-way ladder match also involving The Rascalz (Zachary Wentz and Myron Reed) and Fir$t Cla$$ (A. J. Francis and KC Navarro). Two weeks later on the July 31 episode of TNA Impact!, The Rascalz defeated The Nemeths, but post-match, The Nemeths announced they were invoking their contractually obligated rematch against The Hardys at Emergence. They would later disparage the people of Rhode Island, where the show was being held, before The Home Town Man came out to defend them. Unfortunately, he'd be attacked by The Nemeths before being saved by security. The following week, TNA Director of Authority Santino Marella suspended Nic due to the attack on The Home Town Man, while putting Ryan in a match against The Home Town Man on the Countdown to Emergence pre-show; the TNA World Tag Team Championship match was changed to The Hardys defending the titles against The Rascalz.

On the July 31 TNA Impact!, Leon Slater defeated Jason Hotch and Cedric Alexander to retain the TNA X Division Championship, pinning Hotch to do so. Afterwards, Alexander congratulated Slater and said that they both needed to fight each other again to see who was the better man. TNA then announced that Slater would defend the TNA X Division Championship against Alexander at Emergence.

Also on the July 31 TNA Impact!, The System (Moose and Eddie Edwards) defeated TNA World Champion Trick Williams and A. J. Francis, where Moose pinned Williams following failed interference from KC Navarro. Subsequently, TNA announced that Williams would defend the TNA World Championship against Moose at Emergence.

On the June 19 episode of TNA Impact!, Jake Something made his return from injury and initially feuded with Mance Warner, before setting his sights on Steve Maclin's TNA International Championship. Three weeks later on July 10, Maclin retained his title against both Warner and Something in a three-way match, in which Warner was pinned. Something would later get a singles opportunity for the title against Maclin on the August 7 episode of TNA Impact!, but the match ended in a double countout. Santino Marella then made a rematch official between both men for Emergence in a No Disqualification, No Count-out match.

On the Countdown to Slammiversary pre-show, The Elegance Brand (Ash by Elegance and Heather by Elegance) defeated The IInspiration (Cassie Lee and Jessica McKay) to retain the TNA Knockouts World Tag Team Championship due to outside interference by M by Elegance and The Personal Concierge. Three weeks later on the August 7 episode of TNA Impact!, Léi Yǐng Lee and Xia Brookside defeated M and Heather, as Ash took on Jacy Jayne for the TNA Knockouts World Championship later that night, somewhat putting themselves in the tag team title picture. The following week, Santino Marella announced that at Emergence, The Elegance Brand (represented by Heather and M) would defend the TNA Knockouts World Tag Team Championships against Lee and Brookside, The IInspiration, and Jayne's Fatal Influence stablemates Fallon Henley and Jazmyn Nyx in a four-way tag team match.

After losing to then-TNA X Division Champion Moose on the July 17 TNA Impact!, Sami Callihan was baited to leave his boots in the ring as a sign of retirement, but ultimately decided against it. Two weeks later on July 31, Callihan was interviewed by commentator Tom Hannifan about the comments made by Moose and the decision of retirement. Though Callihan believes his time is winding down, he still wanted to prove to himself that he was still a capable wrestler, and as such, called out Mike Santana for a match at Emergence. The match would be made official the following week. Callihan later reiterated the week after on TNA Impact! that if he lost to Santana at Emergence, he would indeed retire from in-ring competition.

On the August 14 episode of TNA Impact!, Indi Hartwell and Dani Luna were victorious in a tag team match against Harley Hudson and Myla Grace. However, as the two walked back up the ramp, Rosemary, returning after losing a Monster's Ball match against Xia Brookside in June, appeared from the crowd and sprayed Hartwell's face with green mist. In an interview backstage, Rosemary labelled herself as the "gatekeeper" of the Knockouts Division and declared that anyone who wanted to move up had to go through her. As a result, TNA announced a match between Hartwell and Rosemary for the Countdown to Emergence pre-show.

== Reception ==
Ryan Ciocco of 411Mania felt the show was "buoyed by a handful of awesome matches," highlighting the X Division Title opener, the Knockouts Tag and International Title bouts, and the World Title main event, but critiqued that a majority of the matches wavered "around average to good territory," noting that some of them needed more time. He gave it a 7 out of 10, concluding that "there was more good than bad." Chris Vetter of Pro Wrestling Dot Net praised the X Division Title opener and the World Title main event for being "very good matches" that bookended the event, and also gave credit to both the World Tag and International Title bouts. He noted that the show felt awkward with mentioning its "bigger names (Masha, Kazarian, Hendry, Nic Nemeth) were not wrestling" and saw some matches (The System's match, the women's four-way tag) being little more than set up for a future match. Kristian Thompson of TJR Wrestling called Moose-Williams "a really good main event" and Williams' "best match against a TNA opponent so far," Alexander-Slater a "good opener," and the World Tag Title match a "decent outing". He gave it a 6.5 out of 10, saying: "This show was the personification of a non-PLE TNA event. Solid wrestling, with one match that stood above all the others and no notable moments or title changes."

== Results ==
No.	Results	Stipulations	Times
1^{P}	Indi Hartwell defeated Rosemary by pinfall	Singles match	5:27
2^{P}	The Home Town Man defeated Ryan Nemeth by pinfall	Singles match	5:41
3	Leon Slater (c) defeated Cedric Alexander by pinfall	Singles match for the TNA X Division Championship	14:28
4	Matt Cardona defeated Mustafa Ali (with Tasha Steelz, Agent 0, and The Great Hands (John Skyler and Jason Hotch)) by pinfall	Singles match	9:45
5	Fir$t Cla$$ (A. J. Francis and Rich Swann) defeated The System (Brian Myers and Eddie Edwards) (with Alisha Edwards) by pinfall	Tag team match	8:37
6	Mike Santana defeated Sami Callihan by pinfall	Baltimore Street Fight; Since Callihan lost, he retired from in-ring competition.	11:13
7	The Elegance Brand (Heather by Elegance and M by Elegance) (with Ash by Elegance and The Personal Concierge) (c) defeated The IInspiration (Cassie Lee and Jessica McKay) (with Mara Sadè), Fatal Influence (Fallon Henley and Jazmyn Nyx) (with Jacy Jayne), and Léi Yǐng Lee and Xia Brookside (with Masha Slamovich) by pinfall	Four-way tag team match for the TNA Knockouts World Tag Team Championship	11:22
8	Steve Maclin (c) defeated Jake Something by pinfall	No Disqualification, No Countout match for the TNA International Championship	12:22
9	The Hardys (Jeff Hardy and Matt Hardy) (c) defeated The Rascalz (Zachary Wentz and Myron Reed) by pinfall	Tag team match for the TNA World Tag Team Championship	11:52
10	Trick Williams (c) defeated Moose by pinfall	Singles match for the TNA World Championship	16:45
(c) / – the champion(s) heading into the match; P / – the match was broadcast on the pre-show
