= Impact Wrestling Emergence (2023) =

2023 Impact Wrestling event

Emergence
- Promotional poster
- Promotion: Impact Wrestling
- Date: August 27, 2023
- City: Toronto, Ontario, Canada
- Venue: Rebel Entertainment Complex

Impact Plus Monthly Specials chronology
| ← Previous; Against All Odds | Next → Victory Road |

Emergence chronology
| ← Previous; 2022 | Next → 2024 |

The 2023 Emergence was a professional wrestling event produced by Impact Wrestling. It took place on August 27, 2023, at the Rebel Entertainment Complex in Toronto, Ontario, Canada, and aired on Impact Plus and YouTube. It was the fourth event under the Emergence chronology.

Eleven matches were contested at the event, including two on the pre-show and one taped as a digital exclusive. In the main event, Trinity defeated Deonna Purrazzo to retain the Impact Knockouts World Championship. In other prominent matches, Lio Rush, Brian Myers, Bully Ray and Moose defeated Josh Alexander and Time Machine (Chris Sabin, Alex Shelley and Kushida), The Rascalz (Trey Miguel and Zachary Wentz) defeated Subculture (Mark Andrews and Flash Morgan Webster) to win the Impact World Tag Team Championship, Sanada defeated Jake Something; and Eric Young defeated Deaner in a No Disqualification match in the opening bout. The event also marked the return of Sanada and the return from injury by Steve Maclin to assault Josh Alexander. It was also announced during the show, that Jordynne Grace would return at Victory Road.

== Production ==
=== Background ===
Emergence is a professional wrestling event produced by Impact Wrestling. The first event was held in 2020, and it is annually held during the month of August. On April 16, 2023, at Rebellion, it was announced that the 2023 Emergence would take place on August 27, 2023, at the Rebel Entertainment Complex in Toronto, Ontario, Canada.

=== Storylines ===
The event featured several professional wrestling matches that involved different wrestlers from pre-existing scripted feuds, plots, and storylines. Wrestlers portrayed heroes, villains, or less distinguishable characters in scripted events that built tension and culminated in a wrestling match or series of matches. Storylines are produced on Impact's weekly television program.

At Slammiversary, Impact announced that New Japan Pro-Wrestling (NJPW)'s IWGP World Heavyweight Champion Sanada, who previously wrestled for Impact - then known as Total Nonstop Action Wrestling (TNA) - and was a former Impact X Division Champion, would be competing at Emergence. On August 17, Impact announced that Sanada's opponent will be Jake Something in a non-title match.

At Slammiversary, Trinity defeated Deonna Purrazzo to capture the Impact Knockouts World Championship, forcing Purrazzo to submit for the first time in Impact. Two weeks later on Impact!, after Trinity competed in a tag team match, Purrazzo confronted the new champion, challenging Trinity to a rematch at Emergence.

After suffering a torn triceps in April that forced him to vacate the Impact World Championship, Josh Alexander returned to Impact at Slammiversary three months later, confronting new world champion Alex Shelley. On the subsequent episode of Impact!, Alexander cut an in-ring promo, revealing he is cleared to compete again before calling out Shelley. Shelley would come out, but the two would then be joined by Impact X Division Champion Lio Rush, teasing that he would soon invoke Option C for his own world title opportunity. Shelley's longtime friend and Time Machine teammate Kushida would soon join the three, reminding Rush that he himself has an X Division title shot after winning an Ultimate X match at Slammiversary. Ultimately, Alexander, Shelley, and Kushida would be ambushed by Bully Ray, Brian Myers and Moose, who offered Rush the chance to join them, but he instead walked away. The following week, Time Splitters (Shelley and Kushida) defeated Moose and Myers in a tag team match before being attacked again by them, as well as Ray and Rush. Alexander would come down to aid Time Splitters, as would Chris Sabin, who Rush took the X Division title from at Slammiversary after a pre-match attack. Following the altercation, Impact announced that Alexander and Time Machine (Shelley, Sabin, and Kushida) will team up against Ray, Myers, Moose, and rush in an eight-man tag team match at Emergence.

On August 2, Impact announced a four-team tournament to determine who would challenge Impact World Tag Team Champions Subculture (Mark Andrews and Flash Morgan Webster) at Emergence. The tournament began on the August 3 episode of Impact!, when The Rascalz (Trey Miguel and Zachary Wentz) defeated Mike Bailey and Jonathan Gresham to advance to the final. The following week, Rich Swann and Sami Callihan defeated former champions ABC (Ace Austin and Chris Bey) to advance as well. The finals took place on the August 17 Impact!, where The Rascalz defeated Swann and Callihan to win the tournament.

For several months, Johnny Swinger was challenged by Impact President Scott D'Amore to win fifty consecutive matches to earn an Impact World Championship match. After many failed attempts and schemes, Swinger finally won his opportunity after defeating Zicky Dice in a Loser Leaves Impact match on the July 27 episode of Impact!. A few weeks later on the August 10 episode, Swinger was in a backstage interview to discuss when he'd invoke his opportunity before being interrupted by Sheldon Jean and Impact Digital Media Champion Kenny King, who'd brag about how his title's reach extends far beyond that of the world title. With that, on August 15, Impact announced that Swinger would use his title opportunity to challenge King for the Digital Media Championship at Emergence.

Eddie Edwards and Frankie Kazarian had been feuding for the past several months over who was the rightful leader of the locker room. This saw matches between the two at Against All Odds and Slammiversary, with their respective wives Alisha Edwards and Traci Brooks getting involved as well. On the August 10 episode of Impact!, after Alisha won her match, Kazarian attacked Eddie was about to hit him with a kendo stick, only to inadvertently strike Alisha from behind when winding up. The following week, Eddie provided a medical update for Alisha in a backstage interview before being confronted by Kazarian. He had apologized after striking Alisha and suggested that he and Eddie go their separate ways before anyone else was unnecessarily hurt. Eddie, however, suggested otherwise, challenging Kazarian to meet him where their careers began: The wrestling school of their trainer, Killer Kowalski. On August 23, Impact announced that Eddie and Kazarian will face off in a "Back to School" match at Emergence in honor of Kowalski.

At Slammiversary, Eric Young returned to Impact Wrestling, teaming with Scott D'Amore to defeat Bully Ray and Deaner. Young was thought to have been "killed off" by Deaner in a cinematic prison fight where Deaner stabbed Young, giving the former control of their stable Violent By Design (later renamed The Design). However, on the August 3 Impact!, Young revealed extra footage from the encounter, showing he had survived and proclaiming that the concept of Eric Young is an idea that will live forever. Since then, The Design (Deaner and Kon) targeted Young, ambushing him during his matches as Deaner sat upon Young's prone body. On August 24, after Deaner won his match, he challenged Young to a no disqualification match for Emergence, which Young accepted.

== Event ==
Other on-screen personnel
| Role: | Name: |
|---|---|
| Commentators | Tom Hannifan |
| Commentators | Matthew Rehwoldt |
| Commentators | Gail Kim (Knockouts Championship match) |
| Ring announcer | David Penzer |
| Referees | Daniel Spencer |
| Referees | Allison Leigh |
| Referees | Frank Gastineau |
| Interviewer | Gia Miller |

=== Pre-show ===
Three matches took place on the pre-show, with one taped as a digital exclusive. In the opener, Mike Bailey faced Alan Angels. In the closing stages, Angeles delivered a backstabber and an avalanche powerbomb for a two-count. As Angels was attempting the Angels Strike, Bailey countered it into the Tornado Kick and delivered the Ultima Weapon for the three-count.

In the pre-show main event, JOYA (Yuya Uemura and Joe Hendry) faced The Good Hands (Jason Hotch and John Skyler). In the closing stages, Hendry delivered a Fallaway slam to Skyler for a two-count. Hotch and Skyler then delivered a Death drop to Hendry, but Uemura broke up the pin attempt. Hendry then delivered an assisted cutter to Hotch for the win.

=== Preliminary matches ===
The event began with a ten-bell salute to Terry Funk and Windham Rotunda, who both recently died.

In the opening match, Eric Young faced Deaner (with Kon) in a No Disqualification match. In the opening stages, Deaner used a chain to choke Young and then delivered a neckbreaker for a two-count. Deaner then stapled Young's fingers and armpit. Young then delivered a ladder top-rope elbow drop for a two-count. Young then delivered a Death Valley Driver into a trashcan. Young then handcuffed Kon to the turnbuckle, but Kon broke free. Deaner then delivered a low blow to Young Kon and delivered a chokeslam to Young through two chairs for a two-count. Young then delivered a Death Valley Driver to both Kon and Deaner through a barbed wire board, allowing Young to deliver a piledriver to Deaner on the board for the win.

Next, MK Ultra (Killer Kelly and Masha Slamovich) defended the Impact Knockouts World Tag Team Championship against The Death Dollz (Courtney Rush and Jessicka), Jody Threat and KiLynn King and The SHAWntourage (Gisele Shaw and Savannah Evans) (with Ji Vidal). In the closing stages, Slamovich delivered a saito suplex to Rush for a two-count. Rush then used a schoolboy pin on Slamovich for a two-count. Rush then delivered a Spear to Slamovich, Evans delivered a Samoan Drop to Rush, Jessicka delivered a headbutt to Evans, King delivered a roundhouse kick to Evans, Shaw delivered a spinning pump kick to King and Kelly delivered a Death Valley Driver to King: allowing King and Slamovich to deliver a double package piledriver to Rush for the three-count.

Next, Kenny King (with Sheldon Jean) defended the Impact Digital Media Championship against Johnny Swinger. In the closing stages, Swinger delivered an elbow drop to King for a two-count. Swinger then delivered a belly-to-belly suplex and a slingshot leg drop, but King responded with a powerslam for a two-count. As Swinger was going to the top-rope, Jean pushed him, this the referee ejected him. De to the referee being distracted, Heath came out AJ delivered the Wake-up Call to King, allowing Swinger to pin King for a two-count. As Swinger was again going to the top-rope, King stopped him and delivered the Royal Flush to retain the title. After the match, King and Jean attacked Swinger, forcing multiple referees and security guards to stop him. Tommy Dreamer then came out to stop King, but King attacked him and then left. Later on, a match was made between King and Dreamer in a Title vs. Career match for the Digital Media title.

Next, Subculture (Mark Andrews and Flash Morgan Webster) (with Dani Luna) defended the Impact World Tag Team Championship against The Rascalz (Trey Miguel and Zachary Wentz). In the opening stages, Andrews delivered a Norten Lights Suplex to Miguel for a two-count. The Rascalz then delivered a suplex/double stomp combination to Webster for a two-count. As The Rascalz were attempting Hot Fire Flame, Webster got the knees up and used a schoolboy pin on Andrews for a two-count. The Rascalz then delivered Hot Fire Flame and a rolling cutter to Andrews, but Webster broke up the pin attempt. The Good Hands (Jason Hotch and John Skyler) and ABC (Ace Austin and Chris Bey) then came out to attack each other. Luna then delivered diving splash to both ABC and The Good Hands. Miguel then sprayed Webster with a spray paint (unbeknownst to the referee) and delivered an assisted fireman's carry double stomp to become the new champions.

The next match was a Back to School match that took place in Chaotic Wrestling School (Killer Kowalski's school) with no disqualifications. The match was contested between Frankie Kazarian and Eddie Edwards. In the closing stages, Kazarian delivered a hurricarana to Edwards into an exposed concrete floor. Edwards then delivered a backpack stunner for a two-count. Alisha Edwards then came out and distracted Kazarian, allowing Edwards to deliver the Boston Knee Party for the three-count.

Next, Sanada faced Jake Something. In the closing stages, Sanada delivered a Russian leg sweep and a springboard crossbody for a two-count. Sanada then locked in Skull's End, but Something escaped. Sanada then delivered the Magic Whip neckbreaker for a two-count. As Sanada was attempting a moonsault, Something countered it into a mid-air Michinoku Driver and a powerbomb for a two-count. As Something was attempting The Void, Sanada countered it into Deafall for the win.

In the penultimate match, Lio Rush, Brian Myers, Bully Ray and Moose faced Josh Alexander and Time Machine (Chris Sabin, Alex Shelley and Kushida). In the opening stages, as Rush was attempting the Final Hour, Alexander countered it into a German suplex and delivered a rolling senton to Moose for a two-count. Moose then delivered an uppercut, but as he was attempting a powerbomb, Alexander countered it into an ankle lock, but Moose reached the ropes. Alexander then locked in a sharpshooter, but Myers delivered The Roster Cut to Alexander to break up the submission attempt. As Sabin was attempting a suicide dive, Moose caught him and delivered a uranage to Sabin through a table. As Bully Ray was attempting to deliver a powerbomb to Shelley through a table, PCO came out and attacked Bully Ray. As PCO was attempting to deliver a chokeslam to Bully Ray, Myers delivered a low blow to PCO. Myers, Moose and Bully Ray then delivered a triple powerbomb to PCO through a table, but PCO got up and chased Bully Ray. Steve Maclin then made his return and attacked Alexander, allowing Moose to deliver a Spear to Alexander for the win.

=== Main event ===
In the main event, Trinity defended the Impact Knockouts World Championship against Deonna Purrazzo. In the opening stages, as Trinity was attempting a headscissors takedown, Purrazzo countered it into a piledriver and a backstabber for a two-count. Trinity then delivered a Samoan Drop and a diving crossbody for a two-count. Trinity then delivered a headscissors and a split-legged moonsault for another nearfall. Purrazzo then delivered a pump kick and locked in the Venus de Milo, but Trinity escaped. Trinity then delivered a full-nelson bomb, but Purrazzo kicked out. Trinity then delivered a Code Red and then locked in Starstruck, forcing Purrazzo to tap out.

== Results ==
| No. | Results | Stipulations | Times |
|---|---|---|---|
| 1^{D} | Dirty Dango (with Alpha Bravo) defeated Kevin Knight by pinfall (Note: The match was taped for an Impact Digital Exclusive that aired on August 30.) | Singles match | 5:11 |
| 2^{P} | Mike Bailey defeated Alan Angels by pinfall | Singles match | 9:55 |
| 3^{P} | JOYA (Yuya Uemura and Joe Hendry) defeated The Good Hands (Jason Hotch and John Skyler) by pinfall | Tag team match | 6:46 |
| 4 | Eric Young defeated Deaner (with Kon) by pinfall | No Disqualification match | 13:12 |
| 5 | MK Ultra (Killer Kelly and Masha Slamovich) (c) defeated The Death Dollz (Courtney Rush and Jessicka), Jody Threat and KiLynn King, and The SHAWntourage (Gisele Shaw and Savannah Evans) (with Jai Vidal) by pinfall | Four-way tag team match for the Impact Knockouts World Tag Team Championship | 9:07 |
| 6 | Kenny King (c) (with Sheldon Jean) defeated Johnny Swinger by pinfall | Singles match for the Impact Digital Media Championship | 7:12 |
| 7 | The Rascalz (Trey Miguel and Zachary Wentz) defeated Subculture (Mark Andrews and Flash Morgan Webster) (c) (with Dani Luna) by pinfall | Tag team match for the Impact World Tag Team Championship | 18:03 |
| 8 | Eddie Edwards defeated Frankie Kazarian by pinfall | "Back to School" match (Note: The match took place at Killer Kowalski's wrestling school (Chaotic Wrestling) in Boston, Massachusetts.) | 4:36 |
| 9 | Sanada defeated Jake Something by pinfall | Singles match | 13:13 |
| 10 | Bully Ray, Brian Myers, Lio Rush and Moose defeated Josh Alexander and Time Machine (Alex Shelley, Chris Sabin and Kushida) by pinfall | Eight-man tag team match | 22:46 |
| 11 | Trinity (c) defeated Deonna Purrazzo by submission | Singles match for the Impact Knockouts World Championship | 15:44 |
(c) / – the champion(s) heading into the match; D / – this was a dark match; P / – the match was broadcast on the pre-show

=== Impact World Tag Team Championship #1 Contender's Tournament bracket ===
Semifinals; Impact; July 28 (aired August 3 & 10)
The Rascalz (Trey Miguel and Zachary Wentz) | Pin
Mike Bailey and Jonathan Gresham | 9:11
Sami Callihan and Rich Swann | Pin
ABC (Ace Austin and Chris Bey) | 11:12

Final; Impact! July 29 (aired August 17)
The Rascalz | Pin
Sami Callihan and Rich Swann | 14:02

== See also ==
- 2023 in professional wrestling
