= Impact Wrestling Emergence (2020) =

2020 Impact Wrestling special

Emergence (2020)
- Promotional poster
- Promotion: Impact Wrestling
- Date: August 14, 2020 (aired August 18 and 25, 2020)
- City: Nashville, Tennessee
- Venue: Skyway Studios
- Attendance: 0 (behind closed doors) (Note: The event was held without a paying audience due to the COVID-19 pandemic in the United States.)

Impact! special episodes chronology
← Previous; Rebellion	Next → Impact 1000

Emergence chronology
← Previous; First	Next → 2021

The 2020 Emergence was a professional wrestling television special produced by Impact Wrestling. The event took place behind closed doors at Skyway Studios in Nashville, Tennessee on August 18 and 25, 2020 as a two-part special episode for the company's weekly television program, Impact!.

The event comprised a total of 10 matches, with five occurring on the August 18 broadcast and five on August 25. In the main event of the August 18 broadcast, The Motor City Machine Guns (Alex Shelley and Chris Sabin) defeated The North (Ethan Page and Josh Alexander) to retain the Impact World Tag Team Championship, while in the main event of the August 25 broadcast, Deonna Purrazzo defeated Jordynne Grace by two falls to one in the first Knockouts 30-minute Iron Woman match to retain the Impact Knockouts Championship.

== Production ==
=== Background ===
Other on-screen personnel
Role	Name
Commentators	Josh Mathews
Commentators	Madison Rayne
Ring announcer	David Penzer
Referees	Brandon Tolle
Referees	Daniel Spencer
Backstage interviewer	Gia Miller

On August 4, 2020, Impact Wrestling announced that Emergence will be a two night special of the company's television programme, Impact!, that will be broadcast on AXS TV on August 18 and 25, 2020.

=== Storylines ===
The matches are made from scripted storylines, where wrestlers portray heroes, villains, or less distinguishable characters in scripted events that build tension and culminate in a wrestling match or series of matches. Results are predetermined by Impact Wrestling writers, while storylines are produced on their weekly television program, Impact!.

On the July 21 episode of Impact!, The Motor City Machine Guns (Alex Shelley and Chris Sabin) defeated The North (Ethan Page and Josh Alexander) to win the Impact World Tag Team Championship for the second time. On the August 4 episode of Impact!, The North confronted The Motor City Machine Guns to announce their cashing in their rematch clause for the tag titles at Emergence, with Impact announcing it will take place on night one.

At Slammiversary, Deonna Purrazzo defeated Jordynne Grace by submission to win the Impact Knockouts Championship. On the July 28 episode of Impact!, Purrazzo defeated Kimber Lee in a singles match by submission, and after the match, Grace attacked Purrazzo whilst her arm was in a sling, as a result of muscle damaged caused by the armbar submission that made Grace submit to Purrazzo at Slammiversary, causing Purrazzo to flee from the ring. On August 12, it was announced that Purrazzo will defend the title against Grace on night two of Emergence.

At Slammiversary, Chris Bey defeated Willie Mack to win the Impact X Division Championship. The following weeks saw Rohit Raju align himself with Bey and stir up animosity between him and TJP. On the August 11 episode of Impact!, Raju convinced Bey to give both him and TJP an X Division title shot in a three-way match at Emergence, with Impact announcing it will take place on night one.

== Results ==
Night 1 (August 18)
No.	Results	Stipulations	Times
1	Rohit Raju defeated Chris Bey (c) and TJP (with Fallah Bahh) by pinfall	Three-way match for the Impact X Division Championship	10:50
2	Moose (c) defeated Trey by pinfall	Singles match for the unsanctioned TNA World Heavyweight Championship	8:30
3	The Good Brothers (Doc Gallows and Karl Anderson) defeated Ace Austin and Madman Fulton by pinfall	Tag team match	10:56
4	Kylie Rae defeated Taya Valkyrie by pinfall	Singles match with Rosemary as special guest referee	4:49
5	The Motor City Machine Guns (Alex Shelley and Chris Sabin) (c) defeated The North (Ethan Page and Josh Alexander) by pinfall	Tag team match for the Impact World Tag Team Championship	13:25
(c) / – the champion(s) heading into the match

Night 2 (August 25)
No.	Results	Stipulations	Times
1	Eddie Edwards (c) defeated Rob Van Dam (with Katie Forbes) by pinfall	Singles match for the Impact World Championship	7:19
2	Crazzy Steve defeated Johnny Swinger by pinfall	Blindfold match with Cousin Jake as special guest referee	1:23
3	Brian Myers defeated Willie Mack by pinfall	Singles match	9:38
4	Larry D defeated John E. Bravo by pinfall	Singles match with Acey Romero as special guest referee	0:39
5	Deonna Purrazzo (c) defeated Jordynne Grace 2–1	30-minute Iron Woman match for the Impact Knockouts Championship	30:00
(c) / – the champion(s) heading into the match

=== Iron Woman match ===
Score		Point winner	Decision	Notes	Time
Purrazzo	Grace	Point winner	Decision	Notes	Time
0	1	Jordynne Grace	Technical Submission	Grace made Purrazzo pass out in a rear naked choke	25:18
1	1	Deonna Purrazzo	Pinfall	Purrazzo pinned Grace after hitting her with the title belt	28:46
2	1	Deonna Purrazzo	Submission	Purrazzo submitted Grace to a Fujiwara armbar	29:56
