= The Rascalz =

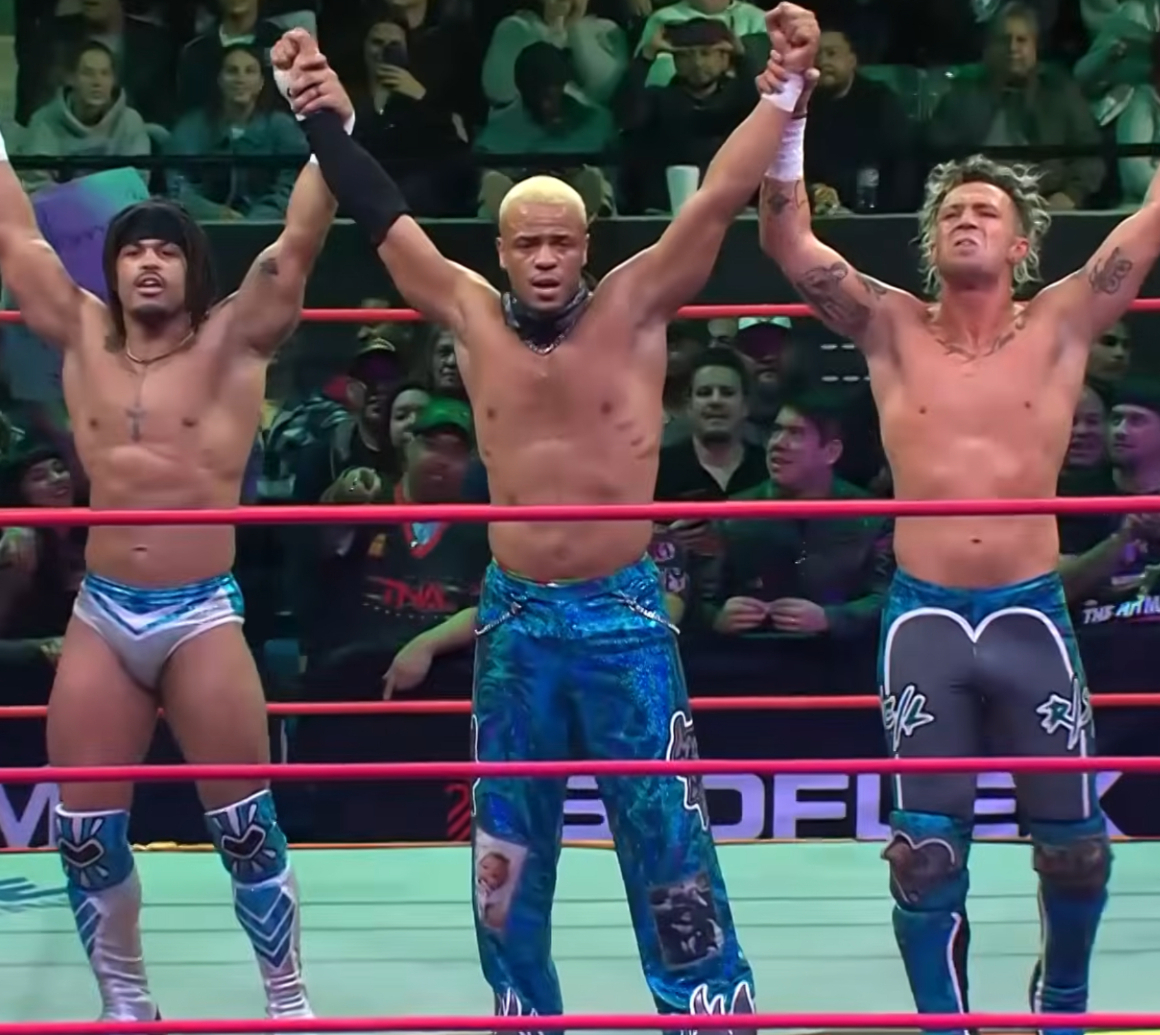
- The Rascalz in 2025. From left to right: Dezmond Xavier, Myron Reed, and Zachary Wentz.

Stable
- Members: Dezmond Xavier / Dez / Wes Lee; Zachary Wentz / Wentz / Nash Carter; Myron Reed
- Name(s): The Rascalz; MSK
- Billed heights: Wentz: 5 ft 10 in (1.78 m); Reed: 6 ft 0 in (1.83 m); Xavier: 5 ft 9 in (1.75 m)
- Combined billed weight: 526 lb (239 kg)
- Billed from: Dayton, Ohio
- Former members: Trey Miguel / Trey
- Debut: March 31, 2018
- Years active: The Rascalz: 2018–2020; 2022–present MSK: 2020–2022; 2024

The Rascalz are an American professional wrestling stable, consisting of Zachary Wentz, Myron Reed, and Dezmond Xavier. They are signed to All Elite Wrestling (AEW) and Ring of Honor (ROH). They are best known for their tenures in Total Nonstop Action Wrestling (TNA), where Wentz is a former one-time TNA X Division Champion, and Wentz and former member Trey Miguel are former one-time Impact World Tag Team Champions.

Zachary Wentz and Dezmond Xavier first teamed together as members of Scarlet and Graves, a stable in Combat Zone Wrestling (CZW). In 2018, Wentz and Xavier formed The Rascalz alongside Trey Miguel and Myron Reed. Wentz, Xavier and Miguel made their debut in Impact Wrestling shortly after. The trio would depart from the company in November 2020 with Xavier and Wentz signing with WWE the following month while Miguel went his separate way and returned to Impact Wrestling the following January. In WWE, Xavier and Wentz's names were changed to Wes Lee and Nash Carter, respectively, and they performed on the NXT brand as MSK, where they were a two-time NXT Tag Team Champions. In April 2022, Carter was released from his WWE contract and reverted as Wentz as he returned to the independent circuit, reuniting The Rascalz with Miguel and Reed. In 2023, Wentz returned to Impact Wrestling. In mid-2024, Wentz and Miguel had a short reunion with Lee in WWE before Lee turned on The Rascalz and feuded with them. At the end of 2024, Reed departed from the stable but returned in mid-2025. In October 2025, Lee was released by WWE. He reverted to Xavier and reunited with The Rascalz a month later. In January 2026, the stable departed TNA and signed with AEW. In the same month, Miguel was released from his AEW contract and announced that he would be taking a hiatus from professional wrestling but would later return to TNA.

== History ==
=== Background and formation ===
Dezmond Xavier and Zachary Wentz teamed with each other for the first time at a Rockstar Pro event Amped on December 12, 2015, by defeating Ohio Is 4 Killers (Dave Crist and Jake Crist). They soon formed an alliance with Dave Crist, JT Davidson and Brittany Blake called Scarlet And Graves at a Combat Zone Wrestling event Seventeen on February 13, 2016, by defeating Conor Claxton, Frankie Pickard and Neiko Sozio. Xavier and Wentz won many tag team titles as part of the stable including the CZW World Tag Team Championship twice and the All American Wrestling Tag Team Championship once. In CZW, they split up from Dave Crist and JT Davidson, with whom Xavier and Wentz had begun feuding and continued to compete as Scarlet And Graves. Xavier and Wentz teamed with their future partner Trey Miguel for the first time to defeat Ohio Is 4 Killers (Dave Crist, Jake Crist and Sami Callihan) in a doors match at EVILution on July 8, 2017.

Scarlet and Graves dissolved in 2017 and Xavier and Wentz formed a tag team called The Rascalz in Fight Club Pro by teaming with Meiko Satomura against Travis Banks and Aussie Open in a six-person tag team match at the second day of the Dream Tag Team Invitational tournament on March 31, 2018.

=== Independent circuit (2018–2020) ===
Xavier and Wentz added Trey Miguel and Myron Reed as the new members of Rascalz in CZW at Welcome to the Combat Zone on April 7, 2018. They defeated Bandido and Flamita and Ohio Versus Everything in a three-way match. At FCP's International Tekkers: Nothing Is True, Everything Is Permitted, Xavier and Wentz captured The Wrestling Revolver's PWR Tag Team Championship by defeating the defending champions Millie McKenzie and Pete Dunne and The Besties In The World (Davey Vega and Mat Fitchett) in a three-way match. They successfully defended the titles in a one-night tag team tournament against Killer Death Machines (Jessicka Havok and Nevaeh), The Crew (Jason Cade and Shane Strickland) and the Latin American Exchange (Santana and Ortiz) at Catalina Wrestling Mixer 2. Miguel and Reed also participated in the tournament, losing to Besties in the World in the opening round. Rascalz held the PWR Tag Team Championship until It's Always Sunny In Iowa on March 3, 2019, where they lost the titles to Latin American Exchange in a three-way match, also involving Besties in the World. Reed would leave the group after Miguel, Xavier and Wentz signed with Impact Wrestling.

On May 12, Miguel and Wentz won the WC Big Top Tag Team Championship at WrestleCircus event Encore by defeating The Dirty Devils (Andy Dalton and Isaiah James) and The Riegel Twins (Logan and Sterling) in a three-way match. After a successful title defense against the Riegel Twins and Private Party (Isiah Kassidy and Marq Quen) at Big Top Revival, Miguel and Wentz vacated the titles on July 25. In the United Kingdom-based Southside Wrestling Entertainment, Xavier and Wentz captured the SWE Tag Team Championship by defeating Chris Tyler and Stixx at III Manors on August 10. They lost the titles to Deadly Sins at Lock, Stock And Three Smoking Rascalz.

=== Pro Wrestling Guerrilla (2018–2020) ===
Dezmond Xavier and Zachary Wentz debuted for Pro Wrestling Guerrilla (PWG) at Time is a Flat Circle on March 23, 2018, by defeating Bandido and Flamita in a tag team match. The following month, during the night one of All Star Weekend on April 20, Rascalz defeated The Chosen Bros (Jeff Cobb and Matt Riddle) and The Young Bucks (Matt and Nick Jackson) in a three-way match to capture the World Tag Team Championship. Rascalz made their first successful title defense the following night against Violence Unlimited. Rascalz would retain the titles throughout the rest of 2018 and 2019 as they successfully defended the titles against The Young Bucks, Lucha Brothers, Latin American Exchange and Best Friends in quick succession. At Two Hundred, Rascalz retained the title against LAX and Lucha Brothers in a three-way match. They successfully defended the titles against Flamita and Rey Horus at Mystery Vortex VI and LAX in a ladder match at Sixteen. Due to the COVID-19 pandemic causing PWG to postpone running shows for over a year, the team remained champions even after signing with WWE/NXT, eventually vacating the titles. At 1025 days, their reign is the longest ever in the promotion’s history.

=== Impact Wrestling (2018–2020) ===
The Rascalz signed with Impact Wrestling in the fall of 2018. Dezmond Xavier had already worked for Impact (then known as Global Force Wrestling), having won the GFW Super X Cup tournament in 2017. Zachary Wentz and Trey Miguel made their first appearance in Impact by teaming with Ace Austin as enhancement talents against oVe (Dave Crist, Jake Crist and Sami Callihan) in a losing effort on the September 6 episode of Impact!. A vignette aired promoting the debut of Rascalz on the November 15 episode of Impact!. Rascalz made their debut as a fan favorite team on the November 29 episode of Impact! as Xavier and Wentz defeated Chris Bey and Mike Sydal. Miguel was in their corner for the match. Rascalz began their feud against Moose in 2019, which led to Rascalz making their pay-per-view debut against Moose and The North in a six-man tag team match at Rebellion, which Rascalz lost. During the match, the ring names of Xavier, Miguel and Wentz were shortened to Dez, Trey and Wentz respectively.

Dez and Wentz would lose to North at Code Red. The Rascalz would then go on to defeat oVe members Dave Crist, Jake Crist and Madman Fulton at A Night You Can't Mist. On the June 7 episode of Impact Wrestling, Dez and Wentz received their first opportunity for the World Tag Team Championship against The Latin American Exchange (Santana and Ortiz), which they lost via disqualification after Wentz interfered in the match. This led to a rematch between the two teams for the titles at Slammiversary XVII. On the July 5 episode of Impact Wrestling, Dez and Wentz defeated Trey in a three-way match to earn the right to be LAX's opponents at Slammiversary. In the meanwhile, LAX lost the titles to The North, which led to North being added into the match, making it a three-way match for the titles, where North retained the titles. Rascalz would then defeat Andy Dalton, Matthew Palmer and Steve O Reno at Bash at the Brewery.

At Slammiversary, The Rascalz, represented by Dez and Wentz, issued an open challenge to any tag team. The reunited Motor City Machine Guns (Alex Shelley and Chris Sabin) accepted the challenge and won the match. Trey challenged for the vacant Impact World Championship in the main event. However, the match was won by Eddie Edwards.

On November 11, it was revealed that The Rascalz would be leaving Impact amid interest from both WWE and All Elite Wrestling. During the November 17 tapings, The Rascalz were given a "send off" by the Impact locker room. Trey confirmed the following day that he, Dez and Wentz were in fact finished with Impact Wrestling. However, since then, Trey Miguel has made his return to IMPACT, effectively ending The Rascalz as a trio.

=== WWE (2020–2022) ===
On December 2, 2020, it was announced that Xavier and Wentz had signed with WWE and would be reporting to the WWE Performance Center. On the January 13, 2021, episode of NXT, Xavier and Wentz debuted as Wes Lee and Nash Carter respectively under the new team name MSK. They defeated Jake Atlas and Isaiah "Swerve" Scott in the first round of the Dusty Rhodes Tag Team Classic tournament. The duo then defeated Drake Maverick and Killian Dain in the second round on the January 27 episode of NXT to advance to the semi-finals. On the February 10 episode, they defeated Legado Del Fantasma (Joaquin Wilde and Raul Mendoza) in the semi-finals. On February 14, at NXT TakeOver: Vengeance Day, MSK defeated the Grizzled Young Veterans (James Drake and Zack Gibson) in the finals to become the 2021 Dusty Rhodes Tag Team Classics winners. At NXT Takeover: Stand & Deliver, MSK defeated Grizzled Young Veterans and Legado Del Fantasma in a triple threat tag team match to win the vacant NXT Tag Team Championship. MSK would have their first successful title defense against the team of Killian Dain and Drake Maverick on the April 13 episode of NXT. At NXT Takeover: In Your House, MSK teamed with NXT North American Champion Bronson Reed to take on Legado Del Fantasma in a winners take all match, where the team of MSK and Reed were successful. At NXT: Halloween Havoc on October 26, MSK lost their titles to Imperium, ending their reign at 201 days. They regained their title from Imperium several months later on April 2, 2022, at NXT Stand & Deliver in a triple threat match that also involved the Creed Brothers.

However, on April 6, Carter was released from his WWE contract and the NXT Tag Team Championship was declared vacant two days later. Lee continued as a singles wrestler in NXT and went on to become the then-longest-reigning NXT North American Champion at 269 days.

=== Return to independent circuit (2022–present) ===
On June 9, 2022, it was announced that The Rascalz would be reforming with Miguel, Wentz and Reed, facing the team of Blake Christian, Nick Wayne and Fuego Del Sol at Warrior Wrestling 24 on June 26. On May 7, 2023, at an Insane Wrestling Revolution event, Miguel and Reed defeated The Death Threat Army in a tag team match for the IWR World Tag Team Championship.

On December 10, 2024, after winning Wrestling Revolver's REVOLVER World Championship three days prior, Reed, disgruntled that he does not have the same opportunities as his stablemates in the top wrestling promotions, announced his departure from The Rascalz. After his departure, Reed defeated Wentz at Game Changer Wrestling (GCW) Thank Me Later on January 11, 2025 and Miguel in a REVOLVER World Championship match at The Wrestling Revolver Square Game on January 31. On March 28, 2026 at Maple Leaf Pro Wrestling pay-per-view event Multiverse representing AEW/ROH, Dezmond Xavier, Myron Reed, and Zachary Wentz faced Amazing Red, Mascara Dorada, and Mistico but in a losing effort.

=== Return to Impact / Total Nonstop Action Wrestling (2023–2026) ===
On the June 29, 2023, episode of Impact Wrestling, Wentz made his return to the promotion, attacking Chris Sabin during his match against Miguel and reuniting The Rascalz in the company as villains in the process. At Emergence, Miguel and Wentz won the Impact World Tag Team Championship for the first time in their careers by defeating Subculture (Mark Andrews and Flash Morgan Webster). At Bound for Glory, The Rascalz lost the Impact World Tag Team Championships to Ace Austin and Chris Bey, ending their reign at 55 days. On the November 9 episode of Impact Wrestling, Reed made his Impact Wrestling debut by joining The Rascalz. Since then, Reed has made sporadic appearances for the company, with his final appearance being on the April 25, 2024 episode of Impact! where he lost to Mike Santana before being quietly removed from the company's roster.

On the July 4, 2024 episode of Impact!, NXT wrestler Charlie Dempsey made his Total Nonstop Action Wrestling (TNA) debut appearance by attacking Miguel and Leon Slater during their match. On the July 11 episode of Impact!, Wentz lost to Dempsey in the latter's TNA in-ring debut after interference from Dempsey's No Quarter Catch Crew (NQCC) stablemate Myles Borne. As Tavion Heights joined Dempsey and Borne after the match, TNA Director of Authority Santino Marella scheduled a six-man tag team match between The Rascalz and NQCC. Wes Lee, the former Dezmond Xavier who reunited with The Rascalz in NXT, made his return to TNA on July 20 at Slammiversary with The Rascalz to defeat NQCC in a six-man tag team match. Lee later turned on The Rascalz in the following month. On the August 8 episode of Impact!, Wentz defeated KC Navarro and NXT's Dante Chen in a three-way match to qualify for an Ultimate X match at Emergence on August 30, where Wentz defeated champion Mike Bailey, Hammerstone, Jason Hotch, Laredo Kid and NXT's Riley Osborne in the Ultimate X match for TNA X Division Championship, winning it for the first time in his career. At Victory Road on September 13, Wentz lost the title to Bailey, ending his reign at 14 days. At Genesis on January 19, 2025, Wentz and Miguel failed to defeat TNA World Tag Team Champions The Hardys (Matt Hardy and Jeff Hardy) for the titles. Later that night, it was announced that Wentz and Miguel will face NXT Tag Team Champions Nathan Frazer and Axiom for the titles (which they were unable to challenge for in October 2024 after Miguel had to undergo an unexpected minor surgery) on the January 23 episode of Impact!, where they lost after Lee and his new allies, Tyriek Igwe and Tyson Dupont, interfered in the match. On the January 30 and February 6 episodes of Impact!, Wentz and Miguel ran out to save Ace Austin from Lee, Igwe and Dupont after Austin's matches against Lee and Dupont respectively. Despite their past differences, Austin joined The Rascalz in their feud against Lee. At Sacrifice on March 14, The Rascalz and Austin defeated Lee, Igwe and Dupont in a "Lucha Rules" six-man tag team match to end the feud.

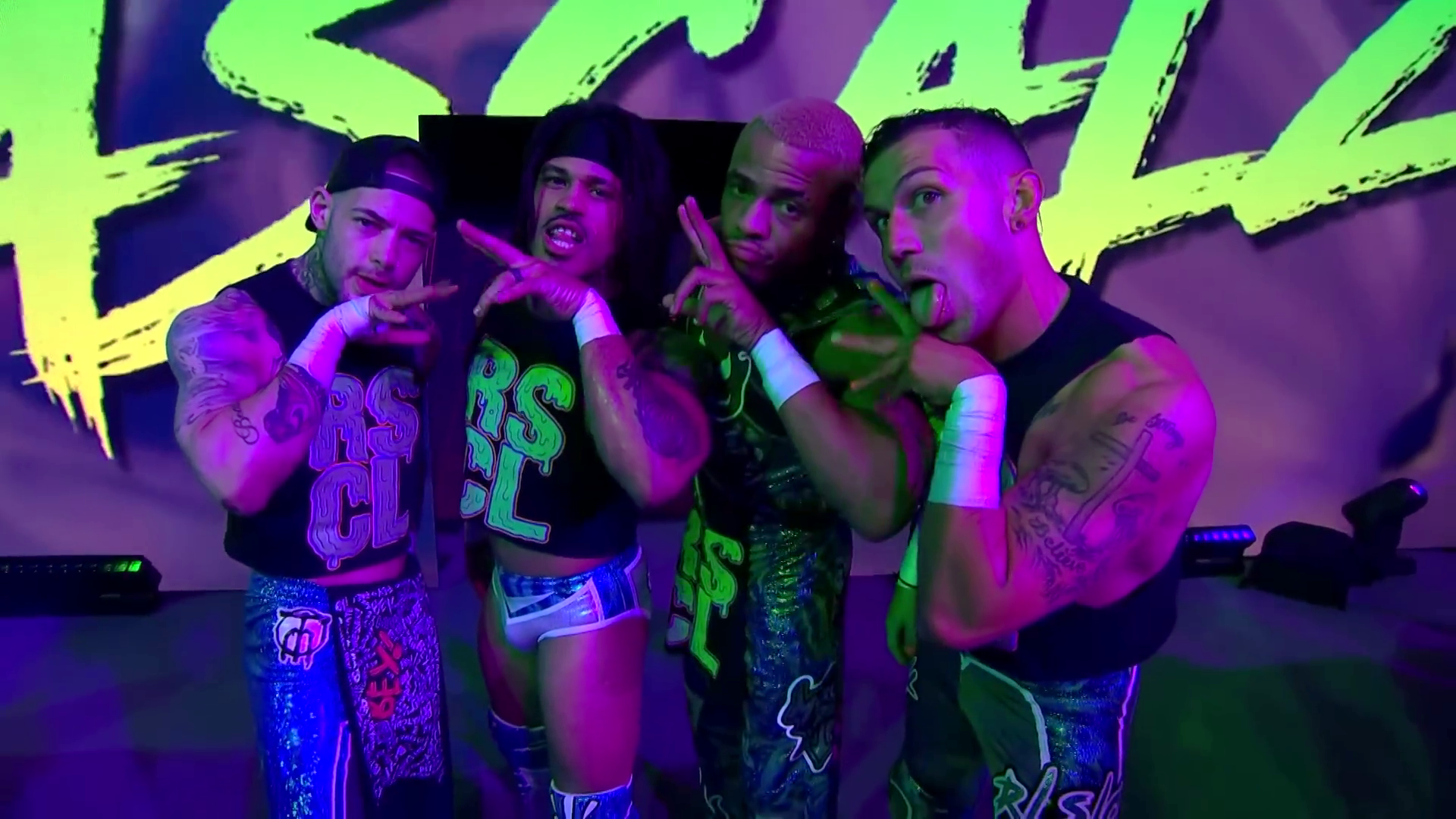
The Rascalz (Trey Miguel, Dezmond Xavier, Myron Reed, and Zachary Wentz (from left to right)) in November 2025

On the July 3 episode of Impact!, Miguel was scheduled to face Nic Nemeth but was later reported as sidelined due to a hernia injury. Wentz replaced Miguel and was accompanied by Reed, who reunited with The Rascalz in the process. It was later reported that Reed is working for TNA as a free agent on a freelance basis. At Emergence on August 15, Reed challenged for the TNA World Tag Team Championship for the first time with Wentz but they failed to defeat The Hardys for the titles. On the September 12 episode of Impact!, Wentz, Reed, Miguel (who returned from injury) and Jake Something faced each other in a four-way match, where Reed won to face Leon Slater for the TNA X Division Championship at Victory Road at September 26 but failed to win the title. Following his release from WWE in October, Lee, now reverted to Dezmond Xavier and turned face, reunited with The Rascalz at Turning Point on November 14, where they defeated The System (Brian Myers, Eddie Edwards, JDC, and Moose) in an eight-man tag team match. This also marked the first time where all four members of The Rascalz wrestled as a team. It was later reported that Xavier is not contracted to TNA but will have creative plans in place for him.

On January 13, 2026, it was reported that the contracts of all members of the stable had expired and TNA elected not to opt-in, making The Rascalz free agents.

=== Return to WWE (2024–2025) ===
After losing a Last Chance match for the NXT North American Championship at NXT Heatwave, Wes Lee, on the July 9, 2024 episode of NXT, was about to announce that he would walk away but was interrupted by Miguel (who makes his WWE debut appearance) and the returning Wentz. Miguel and Wentz convinced Lee to stay and the trio reunite for the first time since 2020. At Week 2 of NXT: The Great American Bash on August 6, Wentz and Lee (as MSK) failed to defeat NXT Tag Team Champions Nathan Frazer and Axiom for the titles. After the match, Lee turned on Miguel and Wentz, lashing out at the latter for leaving him back in 2022 and turning heel for the first time in his career. Wentz returned to NXT on August 20 to attack Lee and a match between Wentz and Lee was made official for NXT No Mercy a week later. A day after winning the TNA X Division Championship at Emergence, Wentz became the third TNA wrestler to walk into WWE with a TNA championship and he defeated Lee at NXT No Mercy on September 1. Two days later on NXT, Miguel and Wentz defeated Gallus (Mark Coffey and Wolfgang) and Hank Walker and Tank Ledger in a triple threat tag team match for a NXT Tag Team Championship match. However, Miguel and Wentz failed to appear for the title match after Lee had taken out Miguel offscreen. In reality, it was reported that Miguel had to undergo an unexpected minor surgery. Lee then challenged Wentz to a Street Fight match at Week 1 of NXT's CW premier on October 1, where Lee won to end the feud for the year.

On the May 6, 2025, episode of NXT, Wentz made a temporary return to NXT where he participated in a 25-man battle royal to become the #1 contender for the NXT Championship. During the battle royal, he reignited his feud with Lee but both men were eventually eliminated. Lee was released by WWE in October, ending his nearly five-year tenure with the promotion. On the October 21 episode of NXT, Wentz participated in the Speed Championship #1 Contender's Tournament where he lost to Jasper Troy in the first round.

=== All Elite Wrestling / Ring of Honor (2026–present) ===
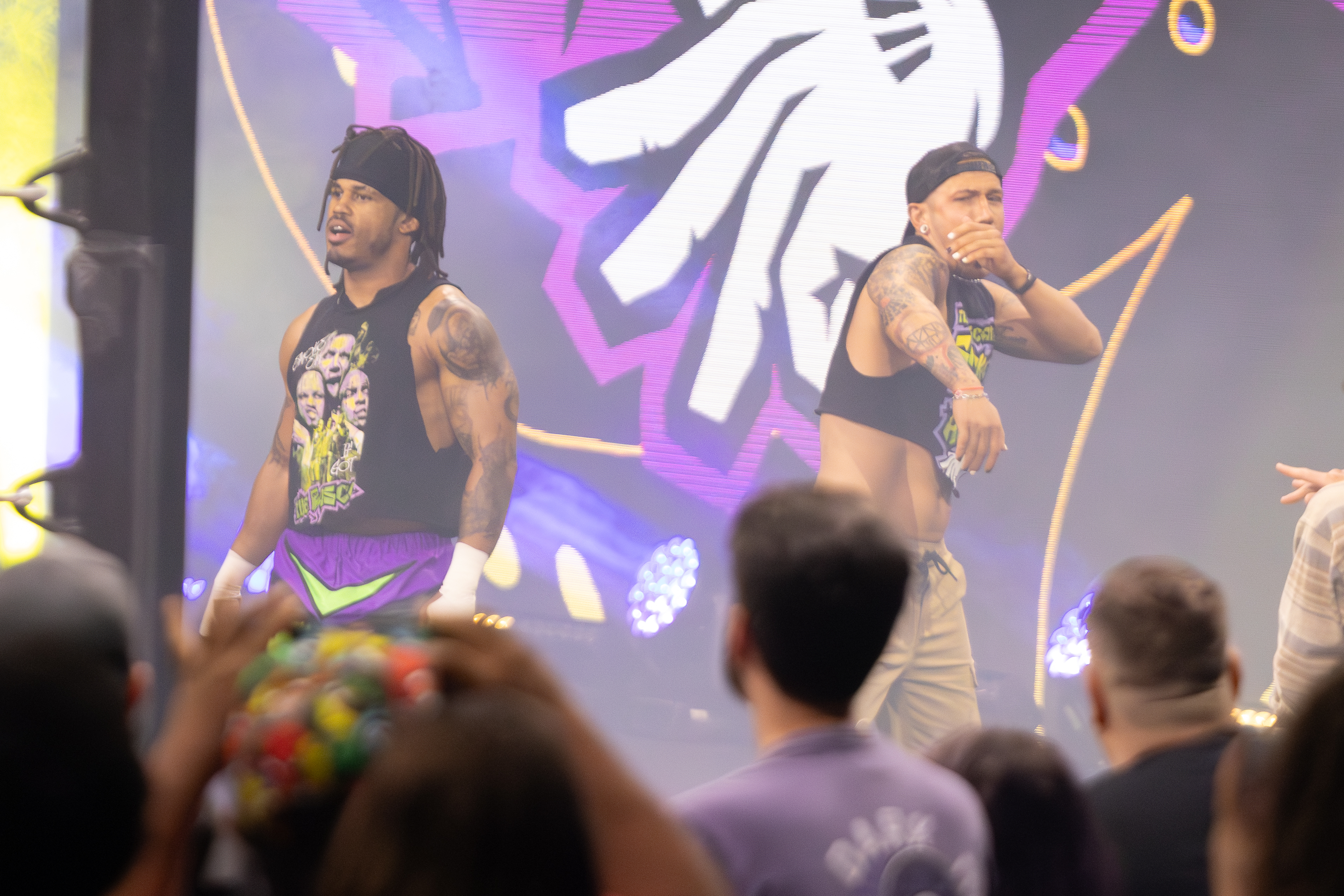
Xavier and Wentz at Supercard of Honor 2026.

In January 2026, it was reported by Fightful Select that all four members of the stable had signed with All Elite Wrestling (AEW). On January 14, 2026 at Dynamite: Maximum Carnage, AEW aired a video teasing The Rascalz's arrival. The stable (barring Miguel) made their on-screen debut on January 17 at Collision: Maximum Carnage in a backstage segment with Lexy Nair. The following day, Miguel was reported to have been released from AEW due to past controversial remarks. Miguel apologized for his remarks and announced that he would be taking a hiatus from professional wrestling, but later re-signed to TNA. On the January 31 episode of Collision, Xavier and Wentz made their AEW in-ring debut, defeating CRU (Action Andretti and Lio Rush). On the February 11 episode of Dynamite, Reed made his in-ring debut, teaming with Xavier in a three-way tag team match for an AEW World Tag Team Championship match, which was won by The Young Bucks (Matt Jackson and Nick Jackson). Over the following months, the Rascalz would appear in AEW's sister promotion Ring of Honor (ROH) and challenge for various tag team and singles championships in both promotions.

== Members ==
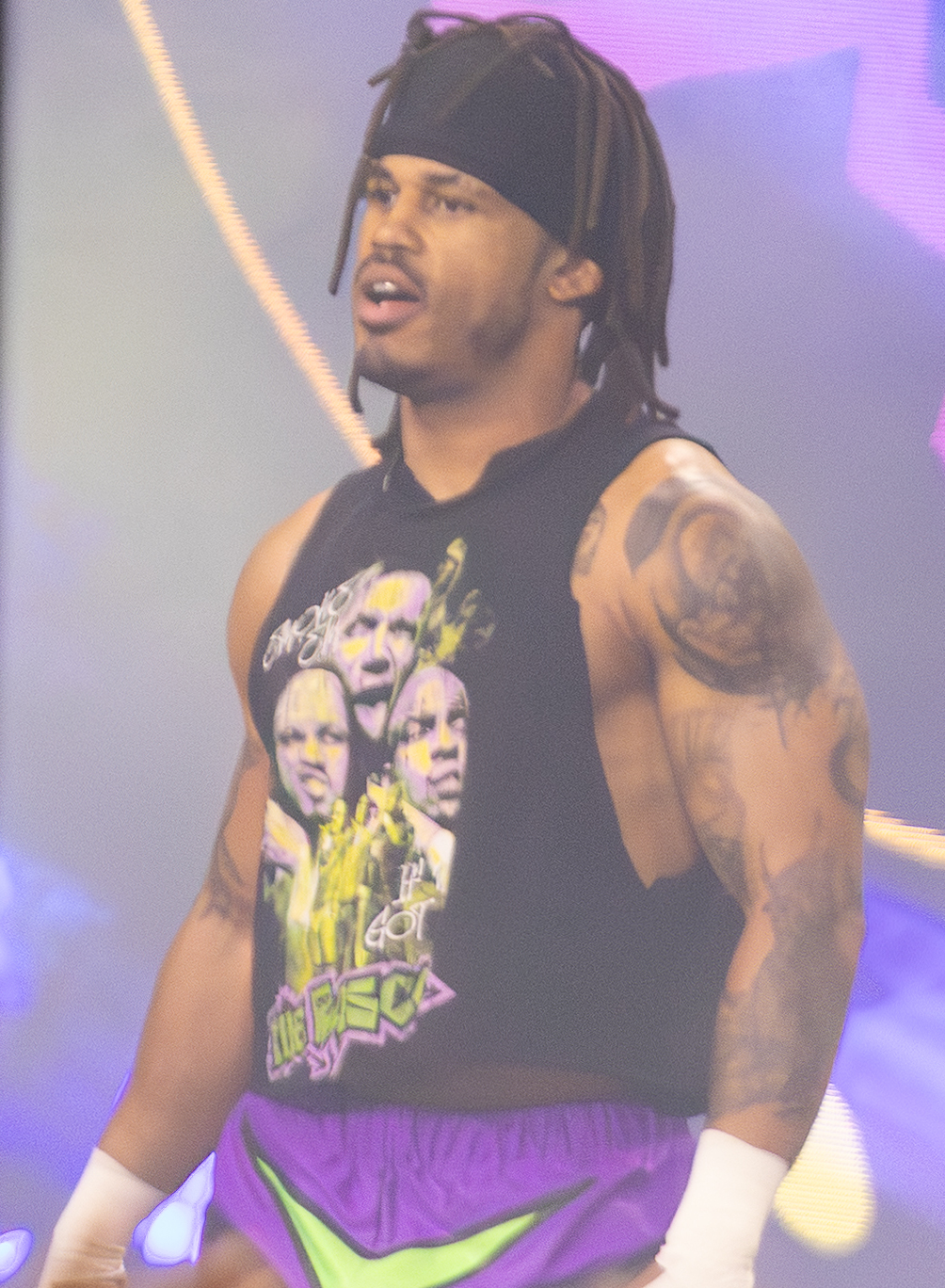
Dezmond Xavier

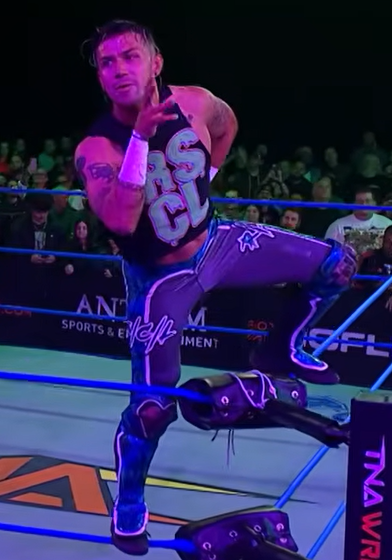
Zachary Wentz

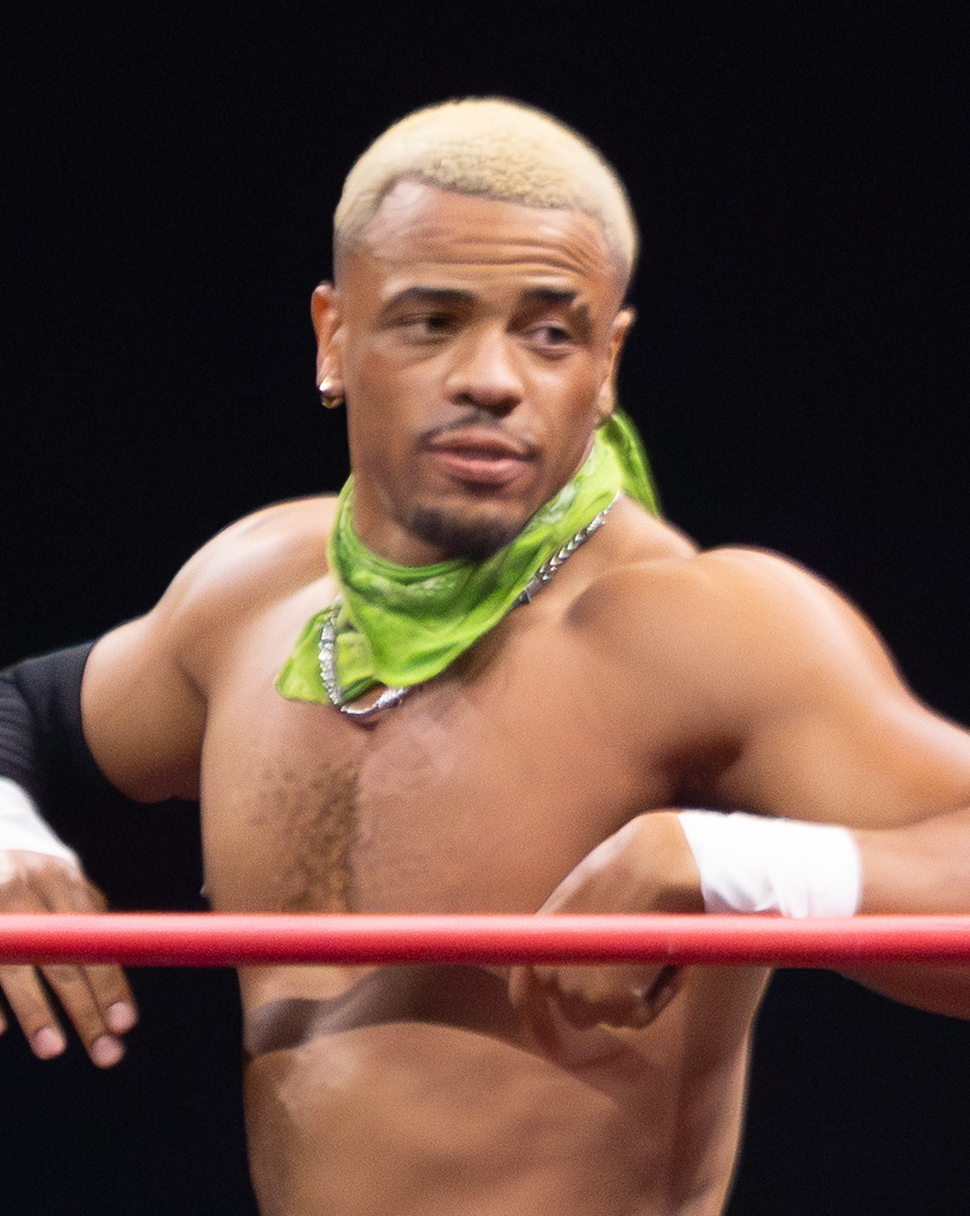
Myron Reed

*	Founding member(s)

=== Current ===
Member		Joined
Dezmond Xavier / Dez / Wes Lee	*	March 31, 2018
Zachary Wentz / Wentz / Nash Carter	*	March 31, 2018
Myron Reed		April 7, 2018

=== Former ===
Member	Joined	Left
Trey Miguel / Trey	April 7, 2018	January 18, 2026

== Sub-groups ==
=== Former ===
Affiliate	Members	Tenure	Promotion
MSK	Nash Carter/Zachary Wentz; Wes Lee	2020–2022; 2024	WWE

== Championships and accomplishments ==
- All American Wrestling
  - AAW Tag Team Championship (1 time) – Xavier and Wentz
- Black Label Pro
  - BLP Midwest Championship (1 time) – Reed
- Circle 6 Wrestling
  - Circle 6 World Championship (1 time) – Wentz
- Destiny Wrestling
  - Destiny Next Generation Championship 1 time) – Miguel
- Combat Zone Wrestling
  - CZW World Tag Team Championship (2 times) – Xavier and Wentz
- Gleat
  - G-Infinity Championship (1 time) – Miguel and Wentz
- Independent Wrestling Expo
  - IWE Heavyweight Championship (1 time) – Reed
- Pro Wrestling Guerrilla
  - PWG World Tag Team Championship (1 time) – Xavier and Wentz
- Southside Wrestling Entertainment
  - SWE Tag Team Championship (1 time) – Xavier and Wentz
  - SWE Speed King Championship (1 time) – Miguel
- The Wrestling Revolver
  - Revolver World Championship (2 times) – Miguel (1), Reed (1)
  - Revolver Remix Championship (1 time, current) – Wentz
  - Revolver World Tag Team Championship (3 times) – Xavier and Wentz (2), Wentz and Miguel (1)
  - PWR Tag Team Championship One Night Tag Team Tournament (2018) – Xavier and Wentz
- Total Nonstop Action Wrestling / Impact Wrestling
  - TNA X Division Championship (1 time) – Wentz
  - Impact World Tag Team Championship (1 time) – Miguel and Wentz
  - GFW Super X Cup (2017) – Xavier
  - Impact Turkey Bowl (2018) – Xavier with KM, Alisha Edwards, Kikutaro, Fallah Bahh
  - Impact World Tag Team Championship #1 Contendership Tournament (2023) – Miguel and Wentz
- VIP Wrestling
  - VIP Tag Team Championship (1 time) – Reed and Wentz
- WrestleCircus
  - WC Big Top Tag Team Championship (1 time, final) – Miguel and Wentz
- WWE
  - NXT Tag Team Championship (2 times) – Lee and Carter
  - Men's Dusty Rhodes Tag Team Classic (2021) – Lee and Carter
- Xtreme Intense Championship Wrestling
  - XICW Tag Team Championship (1 time) – Miguel, Xavier, and Wentz with Aaron Williams, Dave Crist, and Kyle Maverick
