= TNA Emergence (2024) =

2024 TNA Wrestling event

Emergence
- Promotional poster
- Promotion: Total Nonstop Action Wrestling
- Date: August 30, 2024
- City: Louisville, Kentucky
- Venue: Old Forester's Paristown Hall

TNA+ Monthly Specials chronology
← Previous; Against All Odds	Next → Victory Road

Emergence chronology
← Previous; 2023	Next → 2025

The 2024 Emergence was a professional wrestling event produced by Total Nonstop Action Wrestling. It took place on August 30, 2024, at Old Forester's Paristown Hall in Louisville, Kentucky, and aired on TNA+. It was the fifth event under the Emergence chronology.

Eight matches were contested at the event, including two on the Countdown to Emergence pre-show. In the main event, Nic Nemeth defeated Josh Alexander 3–2 in an Iron Man match to retain the TNA World Championship. In another prominent match, which was the opening bout, Zachary Wentz defeated defending champion Mike Bailey, NXT superstar Riley Osborne, Jason Hotch, Hammerstone and Laredo Kid in an Ultimate X match to win the TNA X Division Championship. The event was also notable for the TNA debut of John Layfield.

== Production ==
=== Background ===
Emergence is a professional wrestling event produced by Total Nonstop Action Wrestling (TNA). The first event was held in 2020, and it is annually held during the month of August. On June 14, 2024, at Against All Odds, it was announced that the 2024 Emergence would take place on August 30, 2024, at the Old Forester's Paristown Hall in Louisville, Kentucky.

=== Storylines ===
The event will feature several professional wrestling matches that involved different wrestlers from pre-existing scripted feuds, plots, and storylines. Wrestlers portray heroes, villains, or less distinguishable characters in scripted events that build tension and culminate in a wrestling match or series of matches. Storylines are produced on TNA's weekly programs, Impact! and Xplosion.

On the August 1 episode of Impact!, an Ultimate X match was announced for Emergence for the TNA X Division Championship, with qualifying matches to occur for the following weeks. On August 8, TNA X Division Champion Mike Bailey would defeat Trent Seven and Jake Something to ensure he would defend his title in Ultimate X. Later in the night, Zachary Wentz defeated KC Navarro and NXT wrestler Dante Chen to be the second man to advance. The following week, NXT's Riley Osborne and Jason Hotch qualified for Ultimate X after defeating Chris Bey and John Skyler, and Ace Austin and Rich Swann, respectively. The week after, Hammerstone defeated Kushida and Frankie Kazarian, and Laredo Kid defeated Bhupinder Gujjar and Jai Vidal, to become the final two participants in Ultimate X.

At Slammiversary, Nic Nemeth and Josh Alexander both competed in a six-way elimination match for the TNA World Championship, then held by Moose. Both would make it to the final three after Alexander hit Joe Hendry with a low blow before eliminating him, turning heel for the first time since 2021. Nemeth would then eliminate Alexander and Frankie Kazarian to win the title. Two weeks later on TNA Impact!, Alexander would lay out Nic's brother Ryan Nemeth after the latter's match with Kazarian, before confronting Nic after his successful title defense against Mustafa Ali. The week after, Alexander finally explained his actions at Slammiversary after several refusals, stating that his work paved the way for people like Hendry and Nemeth to thrive in TNA but ultimately went underappreciated. Nemeth then interrupted and attacked Alexander, promising him a title match anytime he wanted. The match would happen the following week but unfortunately ended in a time limit draw. When Nemeth demanded five more minutes, Alexander first refused but changed his mind only after hitting Nemeth with a low blow. The result, however, would stand due to Nemeth's compromised condition. TNA eventually announced that Nemeth and Alexander would have a rematch for the TNA World Championship at Emergence in a 60-minute iron man match.

Following Rebellion, The System (Moose, Brian Myers, Eddie Edwards, and Alisha Edwards) had begun feuding with several wrestlers in TNA. "Broken" Matt Hardy, making his full-time return to TNA in over 7 years, attacked Moose following his TNA World Championship match with Nic Nemeth, making his title aspirations clear. Joe Hendry would also become an enemy of The System after pinning Myers in a "Champions vs. All-Stars" 16-person intergender tag team match on the May 16 episode of TNA Impact!. At Against All Odds, Hardy challenged Moose for the TNA World Championship in a Broken Rules match. The match saw constant interference by The System and a run-in by Hardy's wife Rebecca Hardy, ultimately ending with Moose retaining the title against Hardy. Post-match, The System and their newest member Johnny Dango Curtis (JDC) continued to assault Matt and Rebecca until a combined force of Hendry, Nic and Ryan Nemeth, and a returning Jeff Hardy ran them all off. During the build to Slammiversary, The System would begin to target Mike Santana, who had also returned to TNA at Rebellion with the goal of winning the TNA World Championship. During Santana's "Road to Slammiversary" world title qualifying match against Frankie Kazarian on the June 27 TNA Impact!, JDC pushed Santana into the ring post out of the referee's view, causing him to bleed and lose the match by countout. The following week, Hendry would qualify for the world title match at Slammiversary. Two weeks later, The Hardys (Matt and Jeff) challenged then TNA World Tag Team Champions Myers and Edwards for the titles, only to fail thanks again to interference by JDC. After the match, The System would injure Jeff's neck, taking him out of action for about a month. While Jeff was being stretchered out, Matt found that JDC had also attacked Rebecca backstage. This culminated at Slammiversary where Matt defeated JDC and, during the TNA World Title elimination match, Hendry eliminated Moose, causing the latter to lose the title. For the next month, The System reignited their rivalry with Santana while also having to deal with Hendry. After a brawl in a parking lot on the August 8 TNA Impact!, Moose defeated Santana the following week after The System had attacked him backstage prior to the match. They were about to attack Santana afterward until Hendry came to his aid, who revealed that Moose and JDC would face The Hardys in a tag team match next week The Hardys would emerge victorious before getting into a brawl alongside Hendry and Santana against The System. TNA then announced on their website that Hendry, Santana, and The Hardys would face The System (Moose, Myers, Edwards, and JDC) in an eight-man tag team match at Emergence.

On the August 1 TNA Impact!, PCO and Steph De Lander partook in a wedding ceremony, a culmination of a budding romance storyline between the two. However, the segment was crashed by a returning Matt Cardona, De Lander's tag team partner on the independent circuit. He initially seemed cordial and even had a gift for the pair, which turned out to be a cinderblock as Cardona attacked PCO and inadvertently struck TNA Director of Authority Santino Marella, who presided over the ceremony, as he tried to take De Lander back with him. Cardona would also ruin PCO and De Lander's honeymoon, taking PCO out again with the help of two unknown assistants. On August 15, Marella threatened to sue Cardona for attacking him during the wedding unless he signed on for a match with PCO that night. Cardona flipped that proposal for a six-man tag team match the next week with him, De Lander, and a mystery partner against PCO, Rhino, and Xia Brookside (the best man and maid of honor at the wedding, respectively). However, Cardona claimed not to be medically cleared from a torn pectoral muscle he previously suffered, thus giving De Lander two new partners in Kon and Madman Fulton; unfortunately, they lost, much to Cardona's chagrin and De Lander's relief. PCO and Cardona's singles match would then be signed for Emergence, but Cardona claimed to have reaggravated his injury in training. He then told Marella that he would have another mystery opponent for PCO at the event.

== Results ==
No.	Results	Stipulations	Times
1^{P}	Frankie Kazarian defeated Kushida by pinfall	Singles match	9:57
2^{P}	PCO (c) defeated Shera (with Matt Cardona) by pinfall	Singles match for the TNA Digital Media Championship and Canadian International Heavyweight Championship	5:58
3	Zachary Wentz defeated Mike Bailey (c), Hammerstone, Jason Hotch, Laredo Kid and Riley Osborne	Ultimate X match for the TNA X Division Championship	10:23
4	Steve Maclin defeated Eric Young by pinfall	Singles match	9:53
5	Jordynne Grace and Spitfire (Dani Luna and Jody Threat) defeated Ash by Elegance and The Malisha (Alisha Edwards and Masha Slamovich) (with The Personal Concierge) by pinfall	Six-knockout tag team match	8:03
6	ABC (Ace Austin and Chris Bey) (c) defeated Fir$t Cla$$ (A. J. Francis and KC Navarro) by pinfall	Tag team match for the TNA World Tag Team Championship	11:40
7	The System (Moose, Brian Myers, JDC and Eddie Edwards) defeated Joe Hendry, Mike Santana, and The Hardys ("Broken" Matt Hardy and Jeff Hardy) by pinfall	Eight-man tag team match	19:17
8	Nic Nemeth (c) defeated Josh Alexander 3–2	60-minute Iron Man match for the TNA World Championship	60:00
(c) / – the champion(s) heading into the match; P / – the match was broadcast on the pre-show

=== Iron Man match ===
Score		Point winner	Decision	Notes	Time
Nemeth	Alexander	Point winner	Decision	Notes	Time
1	0	Nic Nemeth	Pinfall	Nemeth pinned Alexander with an inside cradle	10:55
2	0	Nic Nemeth	Pinfall	Nemeth pinned Alexander after the Danger Zone	24:31
2	1	Josh Alexander	Pinfall	Alexander pinned Nemeth after the C4 Spike	44:03
2	2	Josh Alexander	Pinfall	Alexander pinned Nemeth after the C4 Spike	44:46
3	2	Nic Nemeth	Pinfall	Nemeth pinned Alexander after the C4 Spike	59:49
