= Steve Maclin =

American professional wrestler (born 1987)

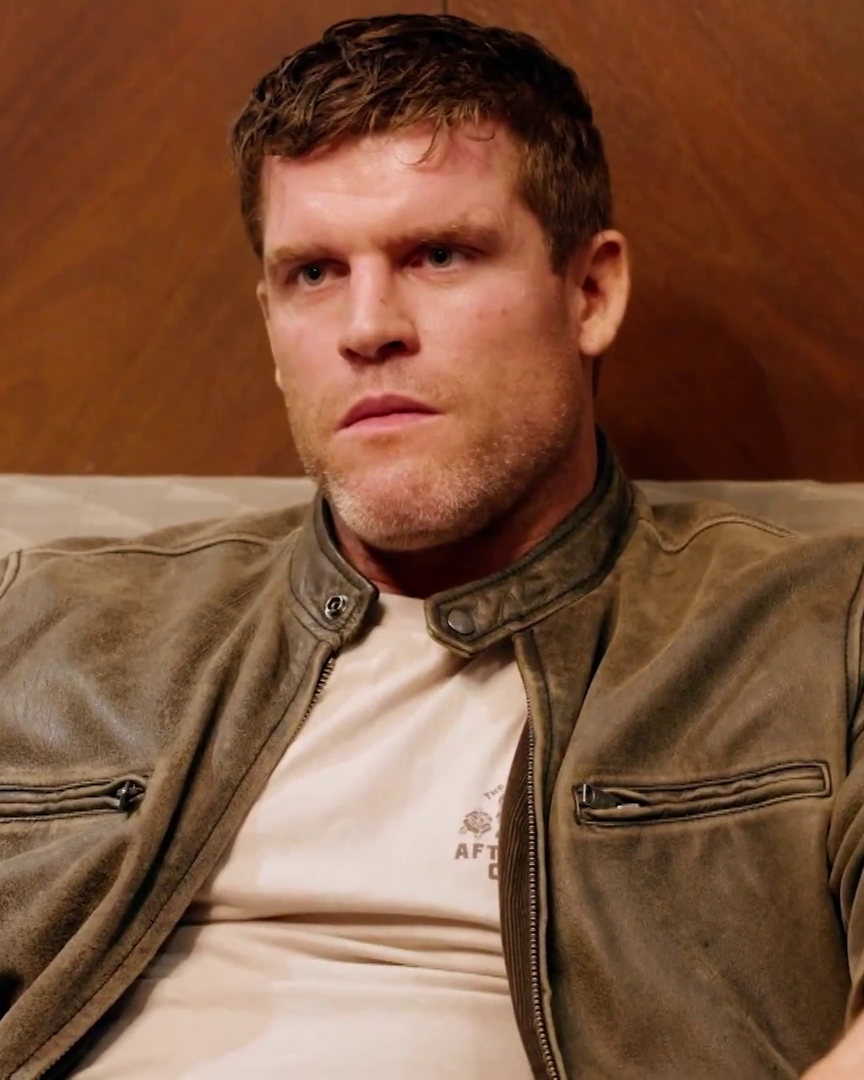
- Maclin in 2026

Personal information
- Born: Stephen Kupryk; May 26, 1987 (age 39) Rutherford, New Jersey, U.S.
- Spouse: Deonna Purrazzo (m. 2022)

Professional wrestling career
- Ring name(s): Steve Cutler; Steve Maclin; Tommy Maclin
- Billed height: 6 ft 1 in (185 cm)
- Billed weight: 227 lb (103 kg)
- Billed from: Rutherford, New Jersey
- Trained by: Danny Cage; Larry Sharpe; WWE Performance Center
- Debut: January 26, 2012
- Military service
- Allegiance: United States
- Branch: United States Marine Corps
- Service years: 2007–2011
- Rank: Corporal
- Unit: Second Battalion, Eighth Marine
- Conflicts: War in Afghanistan

Stephen Kupryk (born May 26, 1987) is an American professional wrestler. He is performing on the independent circuit under the ring name Steve Maclin, primarily for Maple Leaf Pro Wrestling (MLP). He is best known for his time in Total Nonstop Action Wrestling (TNA) and WWE.

After finishing his military enlistment in 2011, he began his professional wrestling career in 2012 on the independent scene as Tommy Maclin. He signed with WWE in 2014 to perform on their developmental territory NXT as Steve Cutler, where he was a member of The Forgotten Sons stable. He was called up to the main roster as part of the SmackDown brand in 2020 before being released in 2021. He signed with Total Nonstop Action Wrestling (TNA; formerly Impact Wrestling) that same year as Steve Maclin, becoming one-time Impact World Champion, and the inaugural and two-time TNA International Champion. He departed TNA in 2026.

== Early life ==
Stephen Kupryk was born on May 26, 1987, in Rutherford, New Jersey. In 2007, he enlisted in the United States Marine Corps, being deployed twice in the War in Afghanistan as a machine gunner with the Second Battalion, Eighth Marine Regiment.

== Professional wrestling career ==
=== Early career (2012–2014) ===
Kupryk began training in professional wrestling after completing his military enlistment. He made his debut on January 26, 2012, at a Monster Factory Pro Wrestling (MFPW) event under the ring name Tommy Maclin, where he defeated Anthony Bennett. In MFPW, he won the MFPW Heavyweight Championship and the MFPW Tag Team Championship.

=== WWE (2014–2021) ===
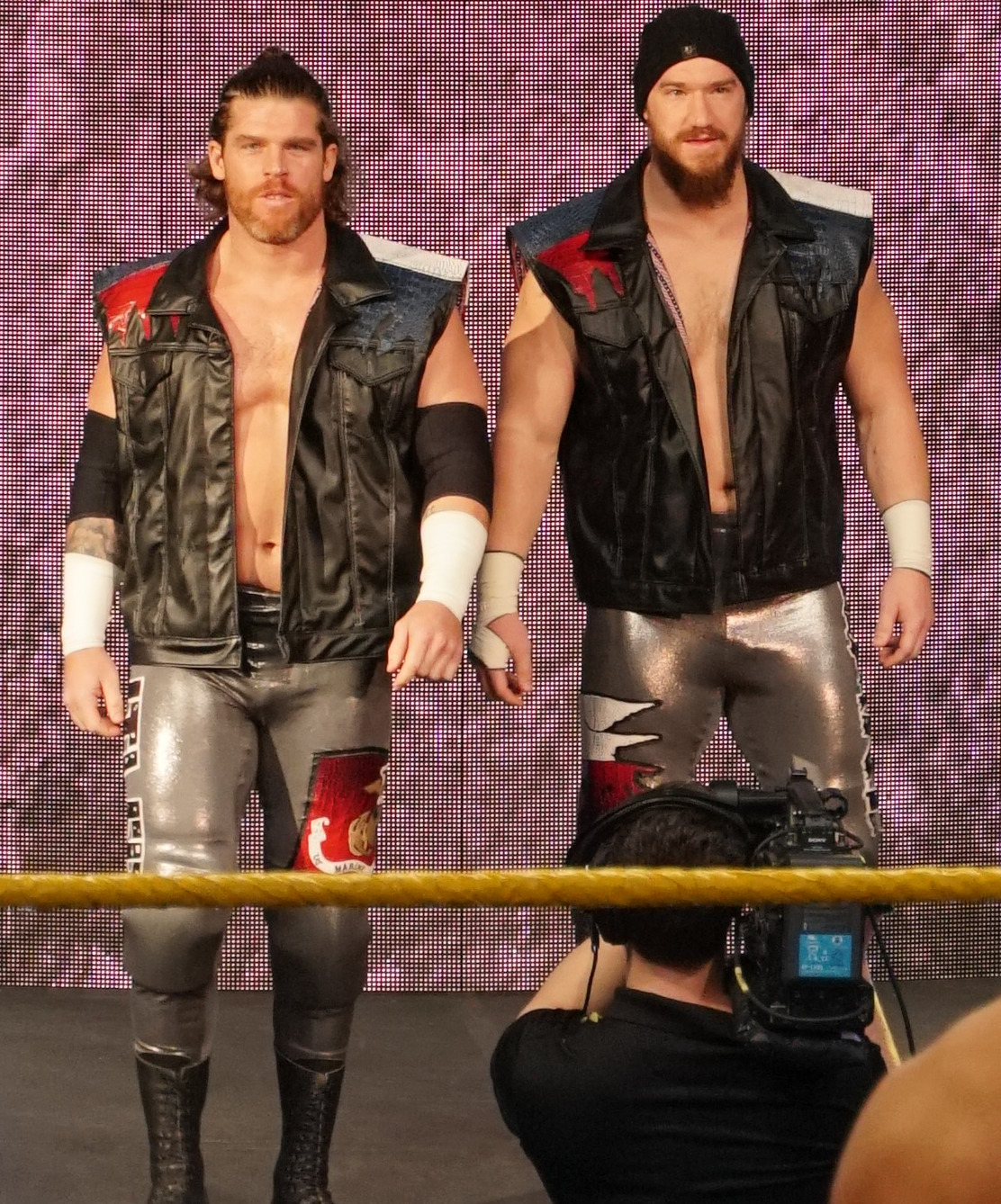
Cutler (left) with The Forgotten Sons stablemate Wesley Blake in 2018.

In 2014, Kupryk signed a contract with the WWE and began training at the WWE Performance Center. He made his debut under the ring name Steve Cutler on the July 3 episode of NXT, losing to CJ Parker. In February 2018, he began teaming with Jaxson Ryker and Wesley Blake as the villainous stable The Forgotten Sons. The trio made their first televised appearance the August 29 episode of NXT in a backstage segment with general manager William Regal. Cutler and Blake represented the group in the 2019 Dusty Rhodes Tag Team Classic, where they defeated Danny Burch and Oney Lorcan in the first round and Moustache Mountain in the semi-finals before losing to Aleister Black and Ricochet in the final. At NXT TakeOver: XXV, Cutler and Blake competed in a fatal four-way ladder match for the vacant NXT Tag Team Championship, and despite interference from Ryker, the two were unsuccessful in winning. The group entered the 2020 Dusty Rhodes Tag Team Classic, but were eliminated in the first round by Imperium (Fabian Aichner and Marcel Barthel).

On the April 10, 2020, episode of SmackDown, The Forgotten Sons made their main roster debut, defeating Lucha House Party (Gran Metalik and Lince Dorado). On the May 1 episode of SmackDown, they defeated SmackDown Tag Team Champions The New Day (Big E and Kofi Kingston). This led to a fatal four-way tag team match also involving Lucha House Party, and John Morrison and the Miz for the title at Money in the Bank, where The New Day retained. The Forgotten Sons began portraying themselves as American patriots, with Cutler and Ryker highlighting their services in the Marines. However, the gimmick was dropped due to a controversial tweet by Ryker supporting President Donald Trump in the middle of the Black Lives Matter movement and the George Floyd protests, which led to backlash from backstage, social media, and within the fan base. The Forgotten Sons were then taken off television as a result. On the December 4 episode of SmackDown, Cutler and Blake, now known as The Knights of the Lone Wolf, made their return by accompanying King Corbin to the ring as they helped him defeat Murphy. However, on February 4, 2021, Cutler was released from his WWE contract.

=== Independent circuit (2021–present) ===
After being released by WWE, Kupryk began appearing on the independent scene as Steve Maclin, working for various promotions.

On June 6, 2026, Maclin and his wife Deonna Purrazzo held their own event named Battle For The Brave, with the proceeds of the show going towards the Tunnels to Towers foundation, which assists military veterans, first responders and their families with things such as mortgages, smart homes and college tuitions. The event featured talent from various promotions such as All Elite Wrestling, Major League Wrestling, and Total Nonstop Action Wrestling. Maclin competed in a 12-man gauntlet match, which was won by Richard Holliday.

=== Impact Wrestling / Total Nonstop Action Wrestling (2021–2026) ===
==== Early feuds (2021–2023) ====
On June 3, 2021, it was announced that Maclin had signed a contract with Impact Wrestling. He made his in-ring debut as a heel on the June 17 episode of Impact!, defeating Jason Page. Maclin started a feud with Petey Williams, defeating him at Emergence and on the September 9 episode of Impact!. Maclin then entered a tournament to determine the new X Division Champion, where he defeated Williams and Black Taurus in the first round, only to lose to Trey Miguel in the final at Bound for Glory, when he pinned New Japan Pro-Wrestling (NJPW) talent El Phantasmo. He got another chance at the title by defeating then-number one contender Laredo Kid on the November 18 episode of Impact!, making it a three-way match at Turning Point, but lost to Miguel again when he pinned Kid. In December, Maclin kidnapped Miguel backstage and received another shot at the X-Division title at Hard To Kill, with the added stipulation that if Maclin lost, he would not get another title opportunity as long as Miguel was champion. At Hard To Kill, Maclin failed to beat Miguel, and could no longer challenge for the X Division Championship.

On the January 20, 2022, episode of Impact!, Maclin fought Jonathan Gresham for the ROH World Championship in a losing effort. At No Surrender, he was part of Team Impact in a 10-man tag team match against Honor No More, but failed to win after Eddie Edwards betrayed them. On March 5, at Sacrifice, Maclin interfered in Rhino's match with Edwards after hitting the former with a kendo stick. At Rebellion, he defeated Chris Sabin and Jay White in a three-way match. On the May 5 episode of Impact!, Maclin lost against NJPW talent Tomohiro Ishii. Two days later, at Under Siege, he lost to Sabin. On the Slammiversary pre-show, Maclin competed in the Reverse Battle Royal, but was eliminated by Chris Bey. On July 1, at Against All Odds, Maclin interfered in the Clockwork Orange House of Fun match by attacking Sami Callihan and helped Moose get the victory. On August 12, at Emergence, he lost against Callihan in a no disqualification match. Six days later, Maclin competed in a six-way elimination match to determine the number one contender to the Impact World Championship, which was won by Edwards. On September 23, at Victory Road, he won a three-way Barbed Wire Massacre against Callihan and Moose. At Bound for Glory, Maclin competed in the Call Your Shot Gauntlet, where the winner could choose any championship match of their choice, being the runner-up in the match after losing to the returning Bully Ray.

==== Impact World Champion (2023–2024) ====
On January 13, 2023, at Hard To Kill, Maclin defeated Rich Swann in a Falls Count Anywhere match. On February 24, at No Surrender, Maclin defeated Brian Myers, PCO and Heath, who Maclin pinned, in a four-way match to become the number one contender for Josh Alexander's Impact World Championship. On March 24, at Sacrifice, Maclin replaced an injured Alexander to team with Swann and Frankie Kazarian, facing Time Machine (Shelley, Sabin, and Kushida) in a losing effort. On April 16, at Rebellion, Maclin defeated Kushida to win the vacant Impact World Championship. On the May 11 episode of Impact!, Maclin made his first successful title defense against Rhino. On May 26 at Under Siege, Maclin successfully retained the title against PCO in a no disqualification match. After the match, Maclin and Bully Ray put Scott D'Amore through a flaming table. On June 9 at Against All Odds, Maclin lost the title to Alex Shelley, ending his reign at 54 days. On June 30, Maclin got his title rematch against Shelley during Night One of Impact's Down Under Tour, but failed to win.

Maclin was set to team with Bully Ray to face Scott D'Amore and a mystery partner at July's Slammiversary, but Impact announced that Maclin is unable to compete due to a "serious injury" he got during their Down Under Tour, which was revealed to be a groin tear. On August 27, at Emergence, Maclin made his return from injury and went after Josh Alexander. On September 8, at Victory Road, Maclin lost to Alexander in the main event. Maclin would then be a part of a three way feud between Moose, Rhino, and PCO. This would lead to a 4-man Monster's Ball match at Bound for Glory, which would be won by PCO.

On January 13, 2024 at Hard To Kill, Maclin would compete in the first match for the newly rebranded TNA, defeating Rich Swann. On the January 18 episode of Impact!, Maclin began a feud with Nic Nemeth. Maclin would then begin a partnership with The Rascalz to counter Nemeth's partnership with Mike Bailey and Trent Seven. After weeks of trading blows with each other, Maclin finally faced off against Nemeth at Sacrifice, where he lost. On the March 14 episode of Impact!, Maclin and The Rascalz would lose to Nemeth and Speedball Mountain, ending their feud. Following this, Maclin and The Rascalz would go their separate ways. On April 20 at Rebellion, Maclin was defeated by a returning Mike Santana.

==== International Champion and departure (2024–2026) ====
On May 3 at Under Siege, Maclin teamed with Frankie Kazarian and lost to Eric Young and Josh Alexander. On June 14 at Against All Odds, Maclin teamed with Santana to defeat The Rascalz. On the June 27 episode of Impact!, Maclin defeated Sami Callihan in a "Road to Slammiversary" qualifier, entering a six-way elimination match for the TNA World Championship. At the event, he was the first one eliminated by Moose. On August 30 at Emergence, Maclin lost to Young, and would shake his hand afterwards, turning face for the first time in his career. On September 13 at the "Countdown to Victory Road", Maclin teamed with Young to defeat Hammerstone and Jake Something. On the October 10 episode of Impact!, Steve Maclin and Eric Young would begin a feud with Josh Alexander and The Northern Armory. After The Northern Armory took out Young, Maclin would challenge Alexander to a match at Bound for Glory, which he lost. At Turning Point, Maclin would defeat Alexander in a no disqualification match. On December 13, at Final Resolution, Maclin competed in a four-way match to determine the number one contender to the TNA World Championship, which was won by Joe Hendry.

On April 17, 2025 at Unbreakable, Maclin entered the tournament to crown the inaugural TNA International Championship, defeating Eddie Edwards and Ace Austin in a triple threat match in the preliminary round. Later in the show, he defeated A. J. Francis and Eric Young to become the inaugural TNA International Champion. On April 27 at Rebellion, Maclin defeated Young in his first title defense. On June 6 at Against All Odds, Maclin successfully defended the TNA International Championship against Mance Warner. On August 15 at Emergence, Maclin defeated Jake Something in a No Disqualification, No Countout match to retain his title. On the September 23 episode of WWE NXT, Maclin, along with other wrestlers of the TNA roster, took part in a major storyline, where they invaded NXT and brawled with various wrestlers on the NXT roster. On September 26 at Victory Road, Maclin would lose the TNA International Championship to Frankie Kazarian, ending his reign at 162 days, but regained it from Kazarian on October 12 at Bound for Glory to become the first-ever two-time International Champion. On December 5 at Final Resolution, Maclin dropped the title to NXT's Channing "Stacks" Lorenzo, ending his second reign at 54 days.

On the January 22, 2026 episode of Impact!, Maclin competed in the Feast or Fired match, where he secured one of the four briefcases. The following week's episode revealed that Maclin had the briefcase that contained the "fired" message, forcing him to (kayfabe) leave TNA. In the following weeks, Maclin would turn heel and begin a feud with the reigning TNA World Champion Mike Santana, believing himself to be too selfless that it cost him his job, and would attack Santana on various occasions. On the March 5, episode of Impact!, Director of Operations Daria Rae officially reinstated Maclin and was granted a world title match against Santana at Sacrifice by Director of Authority Santino Marella. On March 27 at Sacrifice, the bout was ruled a no contest after Maclin was legitimately knocked out after taking a superkick from Santana. TNA President Carlos Silva announced that Maclin was not diagnosed with a concussion. Maclin wrestled in what would be his final TNA match on the May 22 of Impact!, where he unsuccuessfully challenged Santana for the TNA World Championship in a Sacrifice rematch. On June 7, it was announced that Maclin was granted his release from TNA. It was also reported that Maclin had voiced frustration to TNA management on the company's creative direction prior to his release.

=== Maple Leaf Pro Wrestling (2026–present) ===
Maclin made his debut for Maple Leaf Pro Wrestling (MLP) on the August 20, 2026 episode of Mayhem, attacking Psycho Mike and would go on to defeat him a week later. Maclin then began a feud with All Elite Wrestling's Adam Copeland, leading to a Street Fight at Northern Rising on October 3, where Maclin was defeated.

== Other media ==
In September 2025, Maclin, alongside his wife Deonna Purrazzo, launched their own podcast named Boots to Boots.

== Personal life ==
In 2020, Kupryk started dating fellow professional wrestler and New Jersey native Deonna Purrazzo. They were married on November 10, 2022.

== Championships and accomplishments ==
- Boca Raton Championship Wrestling
  - BRCW Heavyweight Championship (1 time)
- Destiny World Wrestling
  - Destiny Wrestling World Championship (1 time)
- Monster Factory Pro Wrestling
  - MFPW Heavyweight Championship (2 times)
  - MFPW Tag Team Championship (1 time) – with Mike Spanos
- Total Nonstop Action Wrestling/Impact Wrestling
  - Impact World Championship (1 time)
  - TNA International Championship (2 times, inaugural)
  - Feast or Fired (2026 – Pink Slip)
- Pro Wrestling Illustrated
  - Ranked No. 41 of the top 500 singles wrestlers in the PWI 500 in 2023
- The Wrestling Revolver
  - Revolver World Championship (1 time)
  - Revolver World Tag Team Championship (3 times) – with Westin Blake (1), Alex Colon and RSP (2), Dark Pledge (1)
