= TNA+ Monthly Specials =

TNA Wrestling's live monthly events airing on TNA+

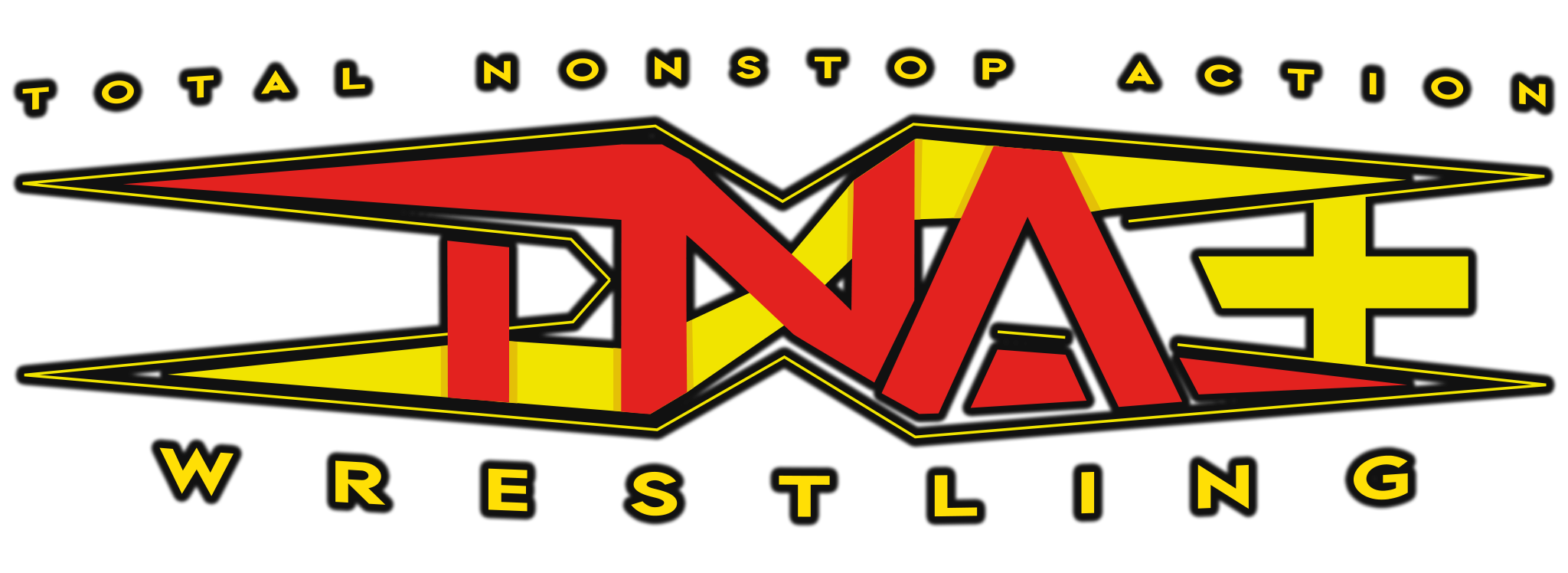
TNA+ logo

TNA+ Monthly Specials are a series of live professional wrestling events held by Total Nonstop Action Wrestling and broadcast exclusively on its streaming service, TNA+ (formerly Impact Plus).

On April 28, 2019, during Rebellion, the promotion (then known as Impact Wrestling) announced the launch of Impact Plus, which replaced their previous streaming service, the Global Wrestling Network (GWN). The service would feature its own series of monthly specials, which in-turn succeed the previous One Night Only series of events that were primarily taped for pay-per-view and, later, GWN. Unlike those events, these specials are broadcast live on the service and are connected to the angles from the promotion's weekly television series, Impact!, leading into the company's main pay-per-view events.

Beginning in 2021, the monthly specials were also streamed on YouTube through the "Impact Wrestling Ultimate Insiders" membership program introduced on August 3. On May 27, 2024, TNA announced that the "YouTube Ultimate Insiders" membership program would close on June 1. On August 26, TNA announced that the "YouTube Insiders" membership program would close on August 30.

== Past events ==
=== 2019 ===
Event	Date	Location	Venue	Main event
Code Red	May 5, 2019	New York City, New York	NYC Arena	Sami Callihan vs. Tommy Dreamer in an oVe Rules match
A Night You Can't Mist	June 8, 2019	Philadelphia, Pennsylvania	2300 Arena	Johnny Impact and Michael Elgin vs. The Great Muta and Tommy Dreamer in a Tag team match
Bash at the Brewery	July 5, 2019	San Antonio, Texas	Freetail Brewing Company	Rob Van Dam vs. Sami Callihan
Unbreakable	August 2, 2019	Santa Ana, California	Esports Arena	Sami Callihan vs. Tessa Blanchard to determine the #1 Contender to the Impact World Championship
Victory Road	September 14, 2019	Enid, Oklahoma	Stride Bank Center	Michael Elgin vs. TJP
Prelude to Glory	October 18, 2019	South Bend, Indiana	Palais Royale	Naomichi Marufuji, Rhino and Rob Van Dam vs. The North (Ethan Page and Josh Alexander) and Michael Elgin in a Six-man tag team match
Turning Point	November 9, 2019	Hazleton, Pennsylvania	Holy Family Academy	Sami Callihan (c) vs. Brian Cage for the Impact World Championship
No Surrender	December 7, 2019	Dayton, Ohio	The Brightside Music & Event Venue	Sami Callihan (c) vs. Rich Swann for the Impact World Championship

=== 2020 ===
Event	Date	Location	Venue	Main event
Bash at the Brewery 2	January 10, 2020	San Antonio, Texas	Freetail Brewing Company	Ohio Versus Everything (Dave Crist, Jake Crist, Madman Fulton and Sami Callihan) vs. Brian Cage, Rich Swann, Tessa Blanchard and Willie Mack in an Eight-person Tag team Elimination match
Sacrifice	February 22, 2020	Louisville, Kentucky	Davis Arena	Tessa Blanchard vs. Ace Austin in a Non-title Champion vs. Champion match
Victory Road	October 3, 2020	Nashville, Tennessee	Skyway Studios	Eric Young (c) vs. Eddie Edwards for the Impact World Championship
Turning Point	November 14, 2020	Nashville, Tennessee	Skyway Studios	Rich Swann (c) vs. Sami Callihan for the Impact World Championship
Final Resolution	December 12, 2020	Nashville, Tennessee	Skyway Studios	Rich Swann (c) vs. Chris Bey for the Impact World Championship

=== 2021 ===
Event	Date	Location	Venue	Main event
Genesis	January 9, 2021	Nashville, Tennessee	Skyway Studios	Willie Mack vs. Moose in an "I Quit" Match
No Surrender	February 13, 2021	Nashville, Tennessee	Skyway Studios	Rich Swann (c) vs. Tommy Dreamer for the Impact World Championship
Sacrifice	March 13, 2021	Nashville, Tennessee	Skyway Studios	Rich Swann (c - Impact) vs. Moose (c - TNA) for the Impact World Championship and TNA World Heavyweight Championship
Hardcore Justice	April 10, 2021	Nashville, Tennessee	Skyway Studios	Team Dreamer (Eddie Edwards, Rich Swann, Willie Mack and Trey Miguel) vs. Violent By Design (Eric Young, Joe Doering, Deaner and Rhino) in a Hardcore War
Under Siege	May 15, 2021	Nashville, Tennessee	Skyway Studios	Moose vs. Chris Sabin vs. Matt Cardona vs. Sami Callihan vs. Trey Miguel vs. Chris Bey in a Six-way match to determine the number one contender for Impact World Championship at Against All Odds
Against All Odds	June 12, 2021	Nashville, Tennessee; Jacksonville, Florida (main event)	Skyway Studios; Daily's Place (main event)	Kenny Omega (c) vs. Moose for the Impact World Championship
Homecoming	July 31, 2021	Nashville, Tennessee	Skyway Studios	Eddie Edwards vs. W. Morrissey in a Hardcore match
Emergence	August 20, 2021	Nashville, Tennessee	Skyway Studios	Christian Cage (c) vs. Brian Myers for the Impact World Championship
Victory Road	September 18, 2021	Nashville, Tennessee	Skyway Studios	Christian Cage (c) vs. Ace Austin for the Impact World Championship
Knockouts Knockdown	October 9, 2021	Nashville, Tennessee	Skyway Studios	Decay (Rosemary and Havok) (c) vs. The Influence (Madison Rayne and Tenille Dashwood) for the Impact Knockouts Tag Team Championship
Turning Point	November 20, 2021	Sunrise Manor, Nevada	Sam's Town Live	Moose (c) vs. Eddie Edwards in a Full Metal Mayhem match for the Impact World Championship
Throwback Throwdown II	December 18, 2021	Louisville, Kentucky	Davis Arena	Sex Ferguson (c) vs. Santa Claus in a North Pole Street Fight for the IPWF International Commonwealth Television Championship

=== 2022 ===
Event	Date	Location	Venue	Main event
No Surrender	February 19, 2022	Westwego, Louisiana	Alario Center	Team Impact (Chris Sabin, Rhino, Rich Swann, Steve Maclin and Willie Mack) vs. Honor No More (Matt Taven, Mike Bennett, PCO, Vincent and Kenny King) (with Maria Kanellis-Bennett) in a 10-man tag team match
Sacrifice	March 5, 2022	Louisville, Kentucky	Old Forester's Paristown Hall	Moose (c) vs. Heath for the Impact World Championship
Under Siege	May 7, 2022	Newport, Kentucky	Promowest Pavilion at Ovation	Josh Alexander (c) vs. Tomohiro Ishii for the Impact World Championship
Against All Odds	July 1, 2022	Atlanta, Georgia	Center Stage	Josh Alexander (c) vs. Joe Doering for the Impact World Championship
Emergence	August 12, 2022	Cicero, Illinois	Cicero Stadium	Josh Alexander (c) vs. Alex Shelley for the Impact World Championship
Victory Road	September 23, 2022	Nashville, Tennessee	Skyway Studios	Moose vs. Sami Callihan vs. Steve Maclin in a Three-way Barbed Wire Massacre
Over Drive	November 18, 2022	Louisville, Kentucky	Old Forester's Paristown Hall	Josh Alexander (c) vs. Frankie Kazarian for the Impact World Championship
Throwback Throwdown III	December 2, 2022 (taped November 25)	Winston-Salem, North Carolina	Benton Convention Center	Team Impact Provincial Wrestling Federation (Colt McCoy, Tim Burr, Frank The Butcher, Giuseppe Scovelli Sr., and Giuseppe Scovelli Jr.) vs. Team Great Lakes Unionized Wrestling (Devon Damon, Neptune, Lord Humongous, and Manfred The Mad Mammal) in an 5-on-4 handicap elimination tag team match

=== 2023 ===
Event	Date	Location	Venue	Main event
No Surrender	February 24, 2023	Sunrise Manor, Nevada	Sam's Town Live	Josh Alexander (c) vs. Rich Swann for the Impact World Championship
Sacrifice	March 24, 2023	Windsor, Ontario, Canada	St. Clair College Sportsplex	Frankie Kazarian, Rich Swann and Steve Maclin vs. Time Machine (Kushida, Alex Shelley and Chris Sabin)
Under Siege	May 26, 2023	London, Ontario, Canada	Western Fair District Agriplex	Steve Maclin (c) vs. PCO in a no disqualification match for the Impact World Championship
Against All Odds	June 9, 2023	Columbus, Ohio	Ohio Expo Center	Steve Maclin (c) vs Alex Shelley for the Impact World Championship
Emergence	August 27, 2023	Toronto, Ontario, Canada	Rebel Entertainment Complex	Trinity (c) vs. Deonna Purrazzo for the Impact Knockouts World Championship
Victory Road	September 8, 2023	White Plains, New York	Westchester County Center	Josh Alexander vs. Steve Maclin
Turning Point	November 3, 2023 (taped October 27)	Newcastle upon Tyne, England	Walker Activity Dome	Will Ospreay vs. Eddie Edwards
Final Resolution	December 9, 2023	Mississauga, Ontario, Canada	Don Kolov Arena	Josh Alexander and Zack Sabre Jr. vs. The Motor City Machine Guns (Alex Shelley and Chris Sabin)

=== 2024 ===
Event	Date	Location	Venue	Main event
No Surrender	February 23, 2024	Westwego, Louisiana	Alario Center	Moose (c) vs. Alex Shelley in a No Surrender Rules match for the TNA World Championship
Sacrifice	March 8, 2024	Windsor, Ontario, Canada	St. Clair College Sportsplex	Moose (c) vs. Eric Young for the TNA World Championship
Under Siege	May 3, 2024	Albany, New York	Washington Avenue Armory	"Broken" Matt Hardy and Speedball Mountain (Trent Seven and Mike Bailey) vs. The System (Moose, Brian Myers and Eddie Edwards)
Against All Odds	June 14, 2024	Cicero, Illinois	Cicero Stadium	Moose (c) vs. "Broken" Matt Hardy in a Broken Rules match for the TNA World Championship
Emergence	August 30, 2024	Louisville, Kentucky	Old Forester's Paristown Hall	Nic Nemeth (c) vs. Josh Alexander in a 60-minute Iron Man match for the TNA World Championship
Victory Road	September 13, 2024	San Antonio, Texas	Boeing Center at Tech Port	Nic Nemeth (c) vs. Moose for the TNA World Championship
Turning Point	November 29, 2024	Winston-Salem, North Carolina	Benton Convention Center	Nic Nemeth (c) vs. Eddie Edwards for the TNA World Championship
Final Resolution	December 13, 2024	Atlanta, Georgia	Center Stage	Nic Nemeth (c) vs. A. J. Francis for the TNA World Championship

=== 2025 ===
Event	Date	Location	Venue	Main event
Sacrifice	March 14, 2025	El Paso, Texas	El Paso County Coliseum	Joe Hendry, Matt Hardy, Elijah, Leon Slater, and Nic Nemeth vs. The System (Brian Myers, Eddie Edwards, and JDC) and The Colóns (Eddie Colón and Orlando Colón) in a 10-man tag team steel cage match
Unbreakable	April 17, 2025	Paradise, Nevada	Cox Pavilion	Steve Maclin vs. A. J. Francis vs. Eric Young in a Tournament final for the inaugural TNA International Championship
Under Siege	May 23, 2025	Brampton, Ontario, Canada	CAA Centre	Joe Hendry and Elijah vs. Trick Williams and Frankie Kazarian
Against All Odds	June 6, 2025	Tempe, Arizona	Mullett Arena	Trick Williams (c) vs. Elijah for the TNA World Championship
Emergence	August 15, 2025	Baltimore, Maryland	Chesapeake Employers Insurance Arena	Trick Williams (c) vs. Moose for the TNA World Championship
Victory Road	September 26, 2025	Edmonton, Alberta, Canada	Edmonton Expo Centre	Leon Slater (c) vs. Myron Reed for the TNA X Division Championship
Turning Point	November 14, 2025	Winter Park, Florida	Full Sail University	Mike Santana and Steve Maclin vs. Frankie Kazarian and Nic Nemeth
Final Resolution	December 5, 2025	El Paso, Texas	El Paso County Coliseum	Frankie Kazarian (c) vs. JDC for the TNA World Championship

=== 2026 ===
Event	Date	Location	Venue	Main event
No Surrender	February 13, 2026	Nashville, Tennessee	The Pinnacle	Mike Santana and Leon Slater vs. Nic Nemeth and Eddie Edwards
Sacrifice	March 27, 2026	Westwego, Louisiana	Alario Center	Mike Santana (c) vs. Steve Maclin for the TNA World Championship
