= Impact Wrestling Emergence (2021) =

2021 Impact Wrestling event

Emergence (2021)
- Promotional poster featuring various Impact wrestlers
- Promotion: Impact Wrestling
- Date: August 15–16, 2021 (aired August 20, 2021)
- City: Nashville, Tennessee
- Venue: Skyway Studios

Impact Plus Monthly Specials chronology
← Previous; Homecoming	Next → Victory Road

Emergence chronology
← Previous; 2020	Next → 2022

The 2021 Emergence was a professional wrestling event produced by Impact Wrestling. It was taped on August 15 and 16, 2021 and aired on Impact Plus on August 20, 2021. It was held at Skyway Studios in Nashville, Tennessee. It was the second event in the Emergence chronology.

Nine matches were contested at the event. In the main event, Christian Cage defeated Brian Myers to retain the Impact World Championship. In other prominent matches, Ace Austin defeated Chris Sabin, Moose, and Sami Callihan in a four-way match to become the number one contender to the Impact World Championship, The Good Brothers (Doc Gallows and Karl Anderson) defeated Rich Swann and Willie Mack, and Violent By Design (Joe Doering and Rhino) to retain the Impact World Tag Team Championship, and Josh Alexander defeated Jake Something to retain the Impact X Division Championship.

The event garnered positive reviews from critics, with much praise being directed to the X Division title match between Jake Something and Josh Alexander.

== Production ==
=== Background ===
In August 2020, Impact Wrestling held a two-night special titled Emergence for their television programme Impact!. On August 5, 2021, Impact announced that Emergence would take place on August 20, 2021 through Impact Plus.

=== Storylines ===
The event featured professional wrestling matches that involved different wrestlers from pre-existing scripted feuds and storylines. Storylines were produced on the weekly television programs, Impact! and Before the Impact.

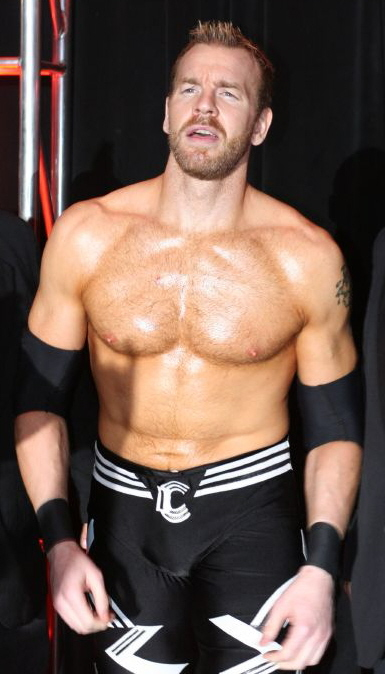
Christian Cage walked into Emergence as Impact World Champion.

On the Impact! following Homecoming, Impact advisor Tommy Dreamer announced a battle royal for the August 12 episode, where the winner will become the number one contender and face the Impact World Champion at Emergence. On the August 12 episode of Impact!, Brian Myers would last eliminate Chris Sabin and Moose to win the match and earn the title shot at Emergence. Meanwhile, Christian Cage defeated Kenny Omega on the debut episode of AEW Rampage on August 13, 2021, to win the Impact World Championship. Thus, Cage would replace Omega in the main event of Emergence and have his first title defense against Myers. Meanwhile, the four men last eliminated in the battle royal - Moose, Sabin, Ace Austin, and Sami Callihan - would face off in a four-way match to determine the next number one contender to the championship.

At Slammiversary, The Good Brothers (Doc Gallows and Karl Anderson) captured their second Impact World Tag Team Championship, defeating Rich Swann and Willie Mack, Fallah Bahh and No Way, and champions Violent By Design (VBD) (Joe Doering and Rhino). VBD would later set sights on Swann and Mack, who they believed cost them the titles. Swann and Mack beat VBD's Deaner and Rhino on the July 29 episode of Impact!, before Deaner would defeat Mack at Homecoming. The following week on Impact!, VBD confronted The Elite (Omega, Gallows, and Anderson), letting them know that they are enacting their rematch clause at Emergence. When they went to notify Impact EVP Scott D'Amore, he was in talks with Swann and Mack about their own title match aspirations. D'Amore later made a three-way tag team match for the championship between The Good Brothers, Swann and Mack, and VBD for Emergence.

On the August 5 episode of Impact!, Jake Something defeated Trey Miguel, Daivari, and Rohit Raju in a four-way match to become the number one contender to Josh Alexander's Impact X Division Championship. The two men will wrestle for the title at Emergence.

At Slammiversary, after Impact Knockouts Champion Deonna Purrazzo defended her title against mystery opponent Thunder Rosa, Mickie James made her return to Impact to invite Purrazzo to NWA EmPowerrr. Purrazzo showed disrespect to James, leading to the latter kicking the former in the face as a result. On the subsequent episode of Impact!, James and Purrazzo confronted each other and came close to blows, before producer Gail Kim came out to calm them down and Purrazzo accepted James' invitation to defend the title at EmPowerrr. On the Impact! following Homecoming, James arrived to have Purrazzo sign the contract to make the Knockouts title match at Empowerrr official, her opponent revealed to be Melina. On the August 19 episode of Impact!, after Melina made her Impact in-ring debut by defeating Brandi Lauren, Purrazzo attacked her and a brawl ensued. Matthew Rehwoldt and Trey Miguel came out to assist Purrazzo and Melina respectively. Later that night, Impact announced that Rehwoldt and Purrazzo will face Trey and Melina in a mixed tag team match at Emergence.

On the July 22 episode of Impact!, Taylor Wilde made her return to Impact and went after Kaleb with a K, leading to them having a match the following week where Wilde won. Wilde explained her two month absence on the August 5 episode of Impact!, saying she was reported as a suspicious person to border security and suspected Tenille Dashwood was behind it, revealing that the person was identified as 'Kalvin With a K'. The following week, Wilde and Dashwood had a match, with a returning Madison Rayne helping Dashwood by tossing Wilde into the ring post. On the August 19 episode of Impact!, Rayne brought back her talk show 'Locker Room Talk', with Dashwood as her special guest. Dashwood explained that Rayne was the tag team partner she was looking for and they would call themselves 'The Influence'. Rayne revealed that she will make her in-ring return when she faces Wilde at Emergence.

On the June 17 episode of Impact!, Steve Maclin (formerly known in WWE as Steve Cutler) made his debut, where he has since competed against enhancement talent. After a double countout with Trey Miguel on the July 29 episode of Before The Impact, Maclin would attempt to injure Miguel with a steel chair, before Petey Williams would stop him. Since then, Maclin would continue to ambush Williams, including at Homecoming, and in the World Championship number one contender's battle royal. On August 12, it was announced that Williams would face Maclin at Emergence.

On the August 12 episode of Impact!, Matt Cardona was going up against John Skyler when Rohit Raju and Shera came to cause a distraction, allowing Skyler to get the upset victory. The following week, Cardona took on Shera when Raju attempted to distract him like before, but Chelsea Green was able to pull him off the apron and Cardona got the win over Shera. Later that night, it was announced that Cardona and Raju will have a match at Emergence.

== Event ==
Other on-screen personnel
Commentators	Matt Striker
Commentators	D'Lo Brown
Ring announcer	David Penzer
Referees	Brian Hebner
Referees	Brandon Tolle
Referees	Daniel Spencer
Interviewer	Gia Miller

=== Preliminary matches ===
The opening match of the event was Matt Cardona (with Chelsea Green) versus Rohit Raju (with Shera). Raju stalls by going out of the ring but goes back outside after Cardona hits a shoulder tackle. Cardona misses a baseball slide to Raju but lands a big boot on the floor. Cardona attempts a slingshot crossbody but gets caught in the ring skirt pulled by Raju, allowing Shera to attack him while the referee is distracted. Raju stomps on Cardona and sends him back outside, leaving Shera to clothesline him on the floor. Raju lands a buzzsaw kick on Cardona for two, avoids the dropkick and hits a clothesline in the back of his head, but kicks out at two. Cardona escapes the armbar and gets a neckbreaker on Raju, the two trading strikes before Cardona gets Raju up for a flapjack. Raju counters Cardona's splash by getting his knees up, hits a neckbreaker and a front suplex, but only gets a near fall. Cardona avoids a cannonball from Raju and hits a Reboot that he kicks out, goes for "Radio Silence" but gets caught in a crossface followed by a flatliner from Raju, but manages to kick out. Raju misses a stomp to Cardona and gets hit with a second rope dropkick and a cutter for a near fall. Shera distracts the referee to allow Raju to roll up Cardona for the pin, but gets caught with his feet on the ropes. Cardona hits "Radio Silence" for the victory. After the match, Shera attacks Cardona with a chokebreaker but gets thwarted when Green steps in and forces him and Raju to leave the ring.

Next, an eight-person tag team match involved Decay (Black Taurus, Crazzy Steve, Havok, and Rosemary) against the team of Fallah Bahh, No Way, Savannah Evans, and Tasha Steelz. Steelz tags in Evans and delivers a big boot to Rosemary, who tags in Steve and bites Evans before being sent to her corner. Bahh hits a belly-to-belly suplex on Steve who manages to escape and tag Taurus in, leading to him landing a sling blade on Bahh and headbutt him to Decay's corner where they bite him. Steve lands a dropkick on Bahh before tagging in Rosemary, who eats a big boot from Evans who tagged in as well. Evans misses a leg drop but manages to drag Rosemary to her corner and tag Steelz to stomp her. Rosemary tags Havok and she hits the Sky High on Steelz, but her pin gets broken up by Evans and the two exchange strikes with each other. Steve and No Way square off before the latter catches the former into a suplex. Bahh misses an elbow drop and gets hit with a top-rope twisting corkscrew from Taurus. Rosemary and Taurus hit a double spear on Bahh, allowing Taurus to get the win for his team.

The third match was Petey Williams versus Steve Maclin. The two start brawling on the ramp before Williams sends Maclin into the steel steps. Back in the ring, the match begins and Williams gets a tornado DDT on Maclin, then hits a dropkick followed by a dive to the outside. Williams continues the assault with punches on the ramp and chops on the barricade to Maclin. Maclin counters a hurricanrana from Williams into a powerbomb on the apron, followed by suplex on the floor and a flying elbow off the apron. Back in the ring, Williams gets some shots on Maclin, but gets caught in an Angle Slam and a neckbreaker. Williams gets a small package on Maclin for two, who takes him down with a clothesline, but manages to get a Russian legsweep and a German suplex before hitting a running knee. Maclin comes back with a double underhook backbreaker, but gets caught in a slingshot codebreaker from Williams, who goes for the "Canadian Destroyer" but gets speared in the corner by Maclin for a near fall. Williams applies a sharpshooter on Maclin who escapes by biting his wrist, then low blows him and hits a sitout slam for the win. After the match, Maclin tosses Williams to the outside.

The fourth match saw Madison Rayne (with Tenille Dashwood and Kaleb with a K) against Taylor Wilde. Wilde hits a series of arm drags that sends Rayne outside to regroup. Wilde hits a dive on Kaleb before getting caught by Rayne with a slingshot in the ropes. Wilde escapes a headlock and lands a back suplex on Rayne. The two trade strikes with each other before Wilde hits a tilt-a-whirl backbreaker on Rayne for two. Rayne hits a ripcord cutter for a two count, gets caught in a bridging German suplex by Wilde, but Kaleb distracts the referee. Dashwood tosses Rayne her loaded bag to distract the referee, allowing her to send Wilde into the steel ring post, and give Rayne the opportunity to roll her up for the win.

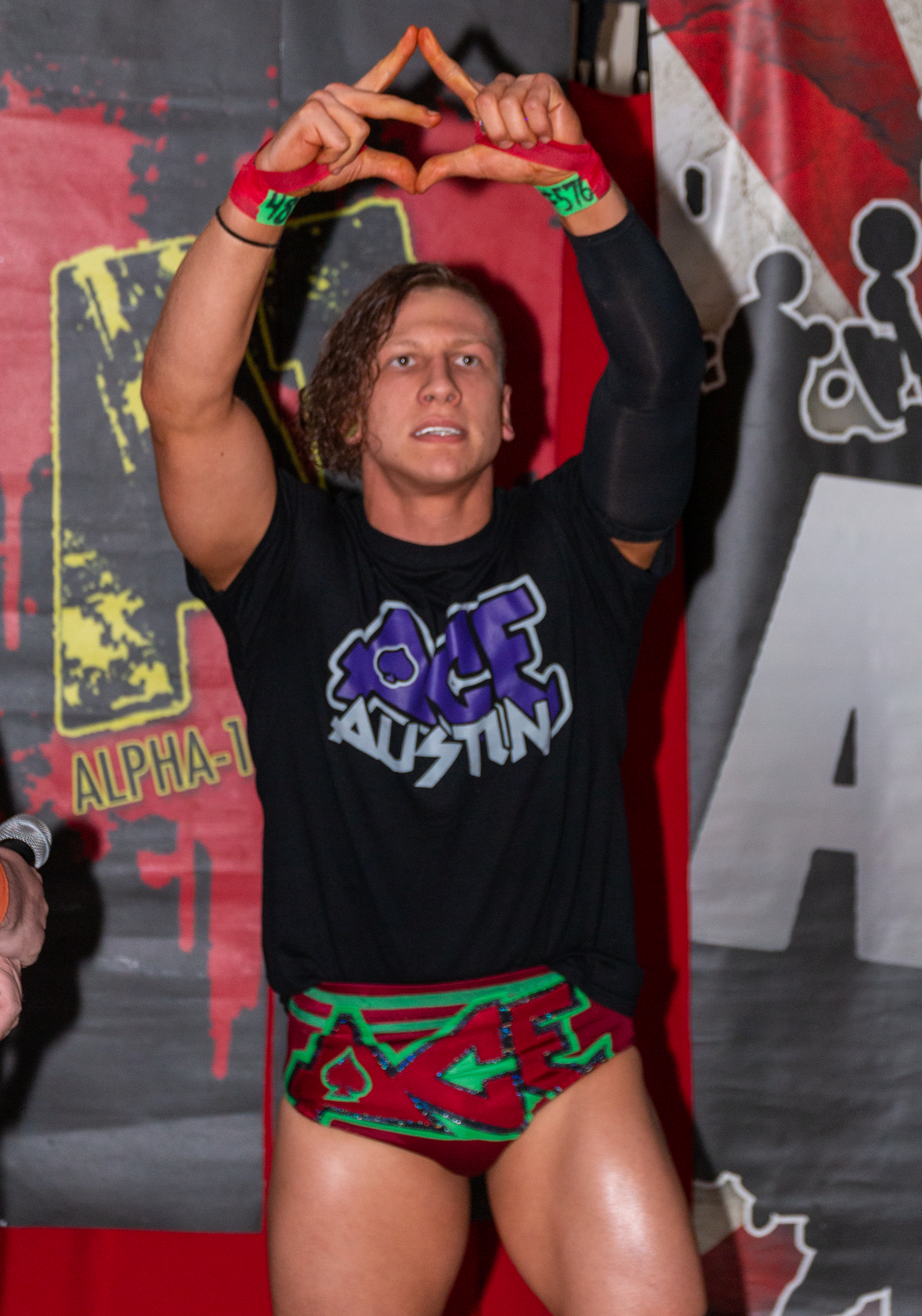
Ace Austin won a four-way match to become number one contender to the Impact World Championship.

The fifth match involved Ace Austin (with Madman Fulton), Chris Sabin, Moose, and Sami Callihan in a four-way match, where the winner becomes the number one contender for the Impact World Championship. Callihan delivers chops and kicks to Moose before Sabin takes him out with a hurricanrana. Austin and Sabin battle in the ring, but Callihan sends the latter to the outside, then gives the former a Death Valley driver into the corner. Callihan kicks Fulton on the outside, but gets booted by Moose, who powerbombs Sabin over the top rope to the floor. Austin hits a Fosbury Flop on Callihan and Moose, but gets powerbombed by the latter on the apron. Moose takes control of the action in the ring, but Sabin fights back with an enzuigiri, a dropkick into the corner, and a tornado DDT for two. Austin gets some offense on Moose and Sabin, hits "The Fold" on Callihan for a near fall, but gets caught in a spike piledriver for another near fall. All four men exchange strikes and moves in the ring that takes them down. Sabin and Callihan trade chops with each other, before the latter takes the former out with a piledriver. Moose hits a pair of uranages on Austin, but gets hit with a chair by Callihan, allowing Austin to get the roll up and win.

The sixth match was contested between Jake Something and Josh Alexander for the X Division Championship. The two lock up before Alexander grounds Jake to the mat, but he's able to power out of it. Alexander tries for the ankle lock early on, but Jake sends him to the corner and hits a running spear. Alexander gets a northern lights suplex for two and continues to lay stomps and punches to Jake. Alexander takes a forearm from Jake before returning with a back elbow, but gets hit with a press that sends him outside. The two trade shots with each other, Alexander goes for a backsplash on Jake from the ring, but gets caught into a Death Valley driver on the floor. Back in the ring, Jake and Alexander trade punches with each other, the former delivering a delayed vertical suplex for a near fall. Alexander hits a knee drop from the second rope, then delivers ten German suplexes to Jake, but he kicks out at two. Alexander goes for the ankle lock but Jake pushes him outside, who then hits a dive on the ramp. Jake hits a falcon arrow for two, but Alexander comes back with a clothesline to the back of the head, followed by a spinning slam for a near fall. Jake gets a belly-to-belly suplex on Alexander, the two deliver ripcord elbows to each other, but Jake hits a lariat before charging at Alexander in the corner. Alexander gets the ankle lock on Jake, who manages to grab the ropes to break the hold, but gets booted to the outside. Alexander hits the "C4" on the apron, but Jake is able to enter the ring to stop the ten count, and deliver a powerbomb for two. Alexander gets another "C4" on Jake to win and retain his title. The two shake hands after the match.

Next, a mixed tag team match involved Deonna Purrazzo and Matthew Rehwoldt against Trey Miguel and Melina. Purrazzo and Melina square off before the latter applies an armlock on the former, then tags Trey who maintains that hold. Rehwoldt tags in before getting dropkicked by Trey, who tags Melina and slams her onto Rehwoldt for two. Melina gets a front facelock on Rehwoldt, but gets caught into his corner, where Purrazzo pulls her hair before Rehwoldt hits a running spear. Purrazzo and Rehwoldt continue to wear Melina down to prevent her from tagging Trey in. Melina hits a neckbreaker and tags Trey, who lands a flurry of shots followed by a double foot stomp, but Rehwoldt kicks out at two. Rehwoldt avoids the slam from Trey and Melina, delivers a double Russian legsweep with Purrazzo, and prevents Trey from tagging in the match. Melina rolls up Rehwoldt for two, but gets attacked by Purrazzo from the outside, allowing Rehwoldt to roll her up for the victory.

In the penultimate match, The Good Brothers (Doc Gallows and Karl Anderson) defended the Impact World Tag Team Championship against Rich Swann and Willie Mack, and Violent By Design (Joe Doering and Rhino) (with Eric Young and Deaner). Doering and Gallows start off by exchanging punches with each other. Mack tags in and hits a baseball slide on Doering, who counters a suplex attempt into his own, and tags Rhino into the match. Mack tags Swann and they hit a splash and leg drop combo on Rhino. Gallows hits a back body drop on Swann for two, and The Good Brothers continue the advantage, tagging in and out while beating on Swann. Gallows delivers a fifteen second delayed vertical suplex on Swann for two. Doering and Rhino take advantage of Swann with a slam and elbow drop from the former and some stomps and punches from the latter. Swann fights back with a low dropkick to Rhino, but Anderson knocks Mack off the apron, and applies a leg lock on Swann. Swann hits an enzuigiri on Anderson and tags Mack in, who takes VBD out and hits a standing moonsault on Anderson, while Swann takes Doering out on the outside. Mack hits a stunner on Anderson, goes to the top rope but gets pushed off by Rhino, who makes the tag. Gallows distracts Rhino so that Anderson can roll him up to retain the tag titles. Young berates Rhino for losing the match and failing Violent By Design.

=== Main event ===
In the main event, Brian Myers (with Sam Beale) went up against Christian Cage for the Impact World Championship. The two exchange holds on the mat, before Cage hits multiple shoulder blocks on Myers, who retreats to the bottom rope. Myers gets some shots on Cage who returns with a kick, he escapes a spear attempt by going outside, but gets sent into the post before being chopped against the barricade. Cage chases Beale following a distraction, who then runs into the ring steps, allowing Myers to slam Cage on the apron. Myers takes control of the action in the ring, Cage fights back with some right punches, but gets tripped by Myers while running the ropes. Myers lands a kick to Cage's head followed by a DDT for two, misses the top-rope elbow drop, and the two exchange punches. Cage delivers punches to Myers in the corner before hitting a second rope dropkick for two. Cage prepares to hit the "Killswitch", but goes after Beale on the outside, leaving him open to a spear by Myers for a near fall. Cage lands a tornado DDT on Myers for another near fall, hits a spear followed by the "Killswitch" to win and retain his title.

== Reception ==
Jack Irene of 411Mania gave the event a 7.5 out of 10. He felt the mixed tag match was the only "low point" that did "nothing special and never really picked up" but was positive towards the rest of the card, praising the X-Division title bout for being "one of the greatest X-Division matches of all time" and the Impact title main event for having "nice technical displays from both men" He called it an "[A]ll around good show here for IMPACT as they head in a new direction." Darrin Lilly of PWTorch called it a "Solid show from top to bottom", praising Alexander-Something for having "an excellent back and forth match" that continued "Alexander's streak of good X Division matches" and Cage-Myers for being "an enjoyable match." He concluded: "You can always count on the Impact Plus specials to deliver a fun night of entertainment." John Powell of Slam Wrestling felt that Myers was out of place in his Impact World title bout against Cage but gave praise to Something for having "the skills and endurance to put on a main event match" during his X Division title match against Alexander, calling it "one of the very best, if not the best, match that Impact has staged this year." He gave the event 3.5 out of 5 stars and called it: "Another mixed bag from Impact. Some really good matches and some really weak, mediocre matches."

== Aftermath ==
After the event, Impact announced that Christian Cage will defend the Impact World Championship against Ace Austin at Victory Road.

On the following Impact!, Eric Young blamed Rhino for failing to regain the tag titles for Violent By Design, and they began torturing him in the following weeks to cure him of "the sickness". On the September 16 episode of Impact!, after losing to Decay, Rhino was attacked by Young, Deaner, and Joe Doering, thus kicking him out of the VBD.

On the September 2 episode of Impact!, Rohit Raju and Shera defeated Matt Cardona and Chelsea Green in a tag team match, after Raju took out the latter with a knee strike. Two weeks later, Cardona attacked Raju and Shera earlier in the day, and was berated by Impact EVP Scott D'Amore when he came to him later that night. D'Amore announced that a no disqualification match between Cardona and Raju would take place at Victory Road, as long as the former does not lay his hands on the latter until that day.

== Results ==
No.	Results	Stipulations	Times
1	Matt Cardona (with Chelsea Green) defeated Rohit Raju (with Shera) by pinfall	Singles match	11:35
2	Decay (Black Taurus, Crazzy Steve, Havok, and Rosemary) defeated Fallah Bahh, No Way, Savannah Evans, and Tasha Steelz by pinfall	Eight-person tag team match	8:35
3	Steve Maclin defeated Petey Williams by pinfall	Singles match	9:58
4	Madison Rayne (with Tenille Dashwood and Kaleb with a K) defeated Taylor Wilde by pinfall	Singles match	7:27
5	Ace Austin (with Madman Fulton) defeated Chris Sabin, Moose, and Sami Callihan by pinfall	Four-way match to determine the number one contender for the Impact World Championship	11:21
6	Josh Alexander (c) defeated Jake Something by pinfall	Singles match for the Impact X Division Championship	17:14
7	Matthew Rehwoldt and Deonna Purrazzo defeated Trey Miguel and Melina by pinfall	Mixed tag team match	10:15
8	The Good Brothers (Doc Gallows and Karl Anderson) (c) defeated Rich Swann and Willie Mack, and Violent By Design (Joe Doering and Rhino) (with Eric Young and Deaner) by pinfall	Three-way tag team match for the Impact World Tag Team Championship	10:51
9	Christian Cage (c) defeated Brian Myers (with Sam Beale) by pinfall	Singles match for the Impact World Championship	12:15
(c) / – the champion(s) heading into the match
