= Jake Something =

American professional wrestler (born 1989)

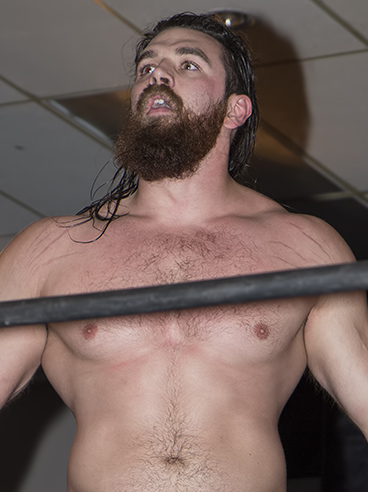
- Doyle in December 2017

Personal information
- Born: Jacob Doyle; July 25, 1989 (age 37) Midland, Michigan, U.S.

Professional wrestling career
- Ring name(s): Cousin Jake; Jacob Hollows; Jake Deaner; Jake Doyle; Jake Holmes; Jake Something
- Billed height: 6 ft 2 in (188 cm)
- Billed weight: 262 lb (119 kg)
- Billed from: The Deaner Compound
- Trained by: Austin Aries; Chris Hero; Daizee Haze; Delirious; Grizzly Redwood; Rhett Titus; ROH Dojo
- Debut: January 2, 2010

Jacob Doyle (born July 25, 1989) is an American professional wrestler. He is signed to All Elite Wrestling (AEW), where he performs under his real name, stylized as Jake Doyle, and is a member of the Don Callis Family. He also performs on the independent circuit. He is best known for his two tenures in Total Nonstop Action Wrestling (TNA), where he wrestled under the ring name Jake Something.

== Professional wrestling career ==
=== Independent circuit (2010–present) ===
Doyle was trained by ROH Dojo. He made his professional wrestling debut at an Insanity Pro Wrestling (IPW) event on January 2, 2010, losing to Chris Hall. In the ensuing years Doyle worked for national companies such as Ring of Honor (ROH) and the National Wrestling Alliance (NWA), and independent promotions such as AAW Wrestling (AAW), Border City Wrestling (BCW) and Deadlock Pro-Wrestling (DPW).

=== Impact Wrestling (2017–2022) ===
He first appeared on the March 23, 2017 episode of Impact! under the ring name Jake Holmes, where he lost to Bobby Lashley. He had two more matches for Impact Wrestling as an enhancement talent the following month.

On March 9, 2018, at the Last Chancery event that featured Impact Wrestling and Border City Wrestling wrestlers, Doyle, now known as Jake Deaner, formed a tag team with Cody Deaner called "The Deaners", losing to Desi Hit Squad (Gursinder Singh and Rohit Raju). In April 2019, he officially signed a contract with Impact Wrestling. Later that month, vignettes began airing of The Deaners on their farm called The Deaner Compound. The Deaners made their Impact! debut on the April 26 episode, defeating Idris Abraham and Joe Coleman. The following month, his ring name was changed to Cousin Jake. At Bound for Glory, Jake took part in the Call Your Shot Gauntlet match, where the winner could choose any championship match of their choice, which was won by Eddie Edwards. On the May 26, 2020 episode of Impact!, The Deaners failed to win the Impact World Tag Team Championship from The North (Ethan Page and Josh Alexander) at The Deaner Compound. On the Countdown to Bound for Glory, The Deaners defeated The Rascalz (Dez and Wentz).

At Turning Point, Jake and Cody were attacked by Eric Young and Joe Doering. During the following weeks, The Deaners feuded with Young and Doering and this resulted in a match between Cody and Young on the December 8 episode of Impact!, which Young won. At Final Resolution, Cody attacked Jake during a match between Rhino and Young, thus ending The Deaners tag team.

Jake then began a feud with Violent By Design, a stable that Cody, now known as Deaner, joined. At Hard To Kill on January 16, 2021, Jake teamed with Rhino and Tommy Dreamer in a loss to Violent By Design in an Old School Rules match. Cousin Jake would change his ring name to Jake Something and defeated Deaner in a singles match at No Surrender and in a tables match on the February 23 episode of Impact!.

On the August 5 episode of Impact!, Something defeated Trey Miguel, Daivari, and Rohit Raju in a four-way match to become the number one contender to the Impact X Division Championship. At Emergence, Something received his championship match against Josh Alexander, where he was unsuccessful in capturing the title. On September 18 at Victory Road, Something competed in a five-way scramble match to determine the number one contender to the X Division Championship, which was won by Laredo Kid. On November 17, he participated in a number one contenders match to the Impact Digital Media Championship, which was won by Chelsea Green.

On January 8, 2022, Something defeated Madman Fulton on the Countdown to Hard To Kill pre-show. On the February 3 episode of Impact!, he teamed with Fulton, Ace Austin, and Mike Bailey for an eight-man tag team match against Bullet Club (Jay White, Chris Bey, Tama Tonga, and Tanga Loa) in a losing effort. At No Surrender, Something defeated Austin, Bey, and Bailey in a four-way match to become the number one contender for the X Division Championship. On March 5 at Sacrifice, Something fought against Trey Miguel for the title in a losing effort. Two days later, Something announced on his Twitter account that he is no longer with Impact Wrestling.

=== All Elite Wrestling (2022) ===
Following his departure from Impact Wrestling, Jake Something would make appearances for All Elite Wrestling. Something made his AEW debut on the May 5 episode of AEW Dark, losing to Jay Lethal. Something would later make two other appearances, losing to Matt Sydal on the June 28 episode of Dark and Danhausen on the July 7 episode of Dark.

=== New Japan Pro Wrestling (2022) ===
Jake Something made his NJPW debut on June 18 episode of NJPW Strong, losing to Brody King. Something would make three more appearances with the company, losing to the likes of Eddie Kingston, Juice Robinson, and Shingo Takagi.

=== Return to Impact/Total Nonstop Action Wrestling (2023–2026) ===
Something made his return to Impact at Slammiversary, losing to Kushida in the Ultimate X match to determine the number one contender for the X-Division Championship. On August 27 at Emergence, Something would face the IWGP World Heavyweight Champion, Sanada, in a losing effort. At Bound for Glory, Something competed in a Call Your Shot Gauntlet match, which would be won by Jordynne Grace.

On January 13, 2024, at Hard to Kill, Something would team with PCO and Rhino to defeat the team of Dirty Dango, Oleg Prudius, and Alpha Bravo. On the January 18 episode of TNA Impact!, Something would win the first match on the newly rebranded show, which was a six-man X Division scramble. On the March 21 episode of Impact!, Something would win the 'Rebellion Referendum' six-pack challenge to challenge Mustafa Ali for the X Division Championship at Rebellion. At the event, Something would face Ali in a losing effort. On the May 16 episode of Impact!, Something attacked Deaner and turned heel. At Slammiversary, Something lost to Mike Santana. At Bound for Glory, Something competed in the 20-person Call Your Shot Gauntlet which was won by Frankie Kazarian. At Final Resolution, Something and Hammerstone were originally scheduled to compete in a Three-way tag team match against The Rascalz (Trey Miguel and Zachary Wentz) and PCO and Sami Callihan but Hammerstone was unable to compete due to an injury leaving Something on his own but lost the match.

On January 19, 2025 at TNA Genesis Jake Something defeated Ashante "Thee" Adonis. At Emergence, Something lost to Steve Maclin in a No Disqualification match failing to win the TNA International Championship. At Bound for Glory, Something competed in 22-person Intergender Call Your Shot Gauntlet failing to win the match. At Turning Point, Something defeated The Home Town Man and Mance Warner in a Three-way match.

His final match in TNA took place on the December 25 episode of Impact!, Something, Jessie McKay, Mance Warner, Ryan Nemeth and Rosemary lost to BDE, Cassie Lee, Dezmond Xavier, Eric Young and Mara Sadè in a ten-person mixed tag team match as his contract would expire on January 1, 2026, ending second tenure with the promotion.

=== Return to AEW (2026–present) ===
On the January 7, 2026 episode of Dynamite, it was announced that Doyle, as "Jake Doyle", had signed with AEW and joined the Don Callis Family after attacking JetSpeed (Kevin Knight and "Speedball" Mike Bailey) off-screen. The following week at Dynamite: Maximum Carnage, Doyle teamed with stablemate Mark Davis to win a four-way tag team match to earn an AEW World Tag Team Championship opportunity. On the January 28 episode of Dynamite, Doyle and Davis unsuccessfully challenged FTR (Cash Wheeler and Dax Harwood) for the tag titles. It was later reported that Doyle suffered a torn bicep during the match, leaving him out of action for 3–6 months. Doyle returned on the May 27 episode of Dynamite. On the October 21 episode of Dynamite, Doyle and Davis defeated the reigning AEW World Tag Team Champions The Young Bucks (Matt Jackson and Nick Jackson) in a championship eliminator match, earning a future title opportunity. On November 4, Doyle and his stablemates competed in a Blood and Guts match at the namesake event, where they were victorious. At Full Gear on November 14, Doyle and Davis failed to win the tag titles from The Young Bucks.

== Championships and accomplishments ==
- AAW Wrestling
  - AAW Heavyweight Championship (1 time)
  - AAW Heritage Championship (1 time)
  - AAW Tag Team Championship (1 time) – with Stallion Rogers
  - Seventh Triple Crown Champion
- Border City Wrestling
  - BCW Can-Am Heavyweight Championship (1 time, current)
  - BCW Can-Am Tag Team Championship (1 time) – with Phil Atlas
- Black Label Pro
  - BLP Heavyweight Championship (1 time)
- Deadlock Pro-Wrestling
  - DPW Worlds Championship (2 times)
  - DPW Worlds Tag Team Championship (1 time) – with "Speedball" Mike Bailey
  - Carolina Classic (2024, 2025)

- DPW Awards (4 times)
  - Wrestler of the Year (2024)
  - Tag Team of the Year (2024) – with "Speedball" Mike Bailey
  - Match of the Year (2024) - with "Speedball" Mike Bailey vs. Violence is Forever (Dominic Garrini and Kevin Ku) at 3rd Anniversary
  - Moment of the Year (2024) – Winning the DPW Worlds Championship at Super Battle

- Glory Pro Wrestling
  - Crown Of Glory Championship (3 times)
- Impact Wrestling
  - Gravy Train Turkey Trot (2023) – with Mike Bailey, Johnny Swinger, and PCO
- Crossfire Wrestling
  - CW Tag Team Championship (1 time) – with Cody Deaner
- Pro Wrestling Illustrated
  - Ranked No. 133 of the top 500 singles wrestlers in the PWI 500 in 2025
- Superkick'D
  - Superkick'D Championship (4 times)
  - Superkick'D King Of The 6IX Championship (2 times)
- The Wrestling Revolver
  - Revolver Remix Championship (1 time)
- Victory Independent Pro Wrestling
  - VIP Tag Team Championship (2 times) – with Donnie Hollows
- Wrestling And Respect
  - WAR Championship (1 time)
  - WAR Tag Team Championship (1 time) – with Donnie Hollows
- Xtreme Intense Championship Wrestling
  - XICW Xtreme Intense Championship (2 times)
  - XICW Light Heavyweight Championship (1 time)
  - XICW Tag Team Championship (2 times) – with Donnie Hollows
