= Impact Wrestling Rebellion (2021) =

2021 Impact Wrestling event

Rebellion (2021)
- Promotional poster featuring Impact World Champion Rich Swann, AEW World Champion Kenny Omega, and Don Callis
- Promotion(s): Impact Wrestling; All Elite Wrestling
- Date: April 25, 2021
- City: Nashville, Tennessee
- Venue: Skyway Studios
- Attendance: 0 (behind closed doors) (Note: The event was held without a paying audience due to the COVID-19 pandemic in the United States.)

Pay-per-view chronology
← Previous; Hard To Kill	Next → Slammiversary

Rebellion chronology
← Previous; 2020	Next → 2022

The 2021 Rebellion was a professional wrestling pay-per-view (PPV) event produced by Impact Wrestling. It took place on April 25, 2021, at the Skyway Studios in Nashville, Tennessee and was streamed live on FITE TV with the pre-show being aired live on AXS TV. It was the third event under the Rebellion chronology.

Nine matches were contested at the event, with one match contested on the pre-show. In the main event, which was a cross-promotional match between Impact and All Elite Wrestling (AEW), AEW World Champion Kenny Omega defeated Impact World Champion Rich Swann in a Winner Takes All match, thus retaining the AEW World Championship and winning the Impact World Championship. In other prominent matches, Jordynne Grace and Rachael Ellering defeated Fire N Flava (Kiera Hogan and Tasha Steelz) to win the Knockouts Tag Team Championship, and Josh Alexander defeated TJP and defending champion Ace Austin to win the X Division Championship in the opening bout. The event also marked the Impact debut of W. Morrissey and the return of Taylor Wilde since 2010.

== Production ==
=== Background ===
Rebellion is a professional wrestling event produced by Impact Wrestling. It is annually held during the month of April, and the event was first held in 2019. Impact Wrestling announced Rebellion would take place in on April 24, 2021. However, on March 25, it was announced that the date of Rebellion moved to April 25.

=== Storylines ===
Other on-screen personnel
English Commentators	Matt Striker
English Commentators	D'Lo Brown
English Commentators	Mauro Ranallo (Main event)
Russian Commentator	Oleg Prudius
Ring announcer	David Penzer
Referees	Brian Hebner
Referees	Aubrey Edwards
Referees	Brandon Tolle
Referees	Daniel Spencer
Interviewer	Gia Miller

The event featured professional wrestling matches that involved different wrestlers from pre-existing scripted feuds and storylines. Wrestlers portray heroes, villains, or less distinguishable characters in scripted events that build tension and culminate in a wrestling match or series of matches.

During All Elite Wrestling's (AEW) special episode of Dynamite titled Winter Is Coming, Impact EVP Don Callis helped Kenny Omega win the AEW World Championship from Jon Moxley, before the pair fled Daily's Place to Skyway Studios for an Impact! taping. The following Tuesday on Impact, Callis and Omega would arrive in a tour bus, discussing the 27-year plan they had to take over the wrestling business. Callis would also intrigue Omega with the prospect of challenging for Impact's titles, with Omega dubbing himself "The Collector". After several appearances on Impact, Omega would make his Impact in-ring debut at Hard To Kill; he teamed with Impact World Tag Team Champions The Good Brothers (Doc Gallows and Karl Anderson) to defeat Chris Sabin, Impact World Champion Rich Swann, and self-proclaimed TNA World Heavyweight Champion Moose (subbing for Alex Shelley). On the March 9 episode of Impact, Impact EVP Scott D'Amore announced that Omega would wrestle in the main event of Rebellion in a title vs. title match, and he would face the winner of a championship unification match between Rich Swann and Moose, which would take place at Sacrifice. Swann won the match, making the match Swann vs. Omega for the Impact and AEW World Championships. On April 15, it was announced that Mauro Ranallo would be the guest commentator for the main event. It was also revealed that in addition to an Impact referee, an AEW referee would also be present to ensure there would be a definitive winner.

On the August 11, 2020 episode of Impact, Brian Myers made his return to the company by answering then-Impact World Champion Eddie Edwards' Impact World Championship open challenge. Myers introduced a new persona called "The World's Most Professional Wrestler", an ironic character as Myers would constantly cheat in his matches and act unprofessional backstage. At Hard To Kill, Myers' friend and former tag team partner Matt Cardona made his debut, defeating Ace Austin by disqualification. Over the following months, Myers would accuse Cardona of being obsessed with him and following him to Impact. For his part, Cardona rebutted that he did not come to fight or team with Myers, and that he is only here for himself. After much tension between the two, Cardona finally challenged Myers to a match at Rebellion, which Myers first refused, but changed his mind the next week.

On the January 26 episode of Impact, Trey Miguel made a surprise return to the company and teamed with Rich Swann, Tommy Dreamer, and Willie Mack to defeat Chris Bey, Moose, Ken Shamrock, and Sami Callihan. Over the following months, Callihan would constantly get in Miguel's face for being hypocritical when he returned not so long after an emotional farewell match, and claimed that he has lost the passion for the business. He would also play harsh mind games with Miguel, invading Miguel's Skull & Bones Professional Wrestling Academy, attacking its trainees and his mentor CK3, and forcing Miguel to wrestle his student Sam Beale - indoctrinated by the message of no passion, before piledriving the rookie. This led to a match between Miguel and Callihan on the March 16 episode of Impact, won by Callihan. Despite the win, Callihan continued the mind games. On the March 23 episode of Impact, after Miguel defeated XXXL's Acey Romero, Romero's tag team partner Larry D would jump him from behind, prompting Callihan to suspiciously save Miguel. Miguel would not do the same when Callihan battled Larry D the following week, where the two would try and outdo each other in a tag team match against XXXL. On the Impact after Hardcore Justice, Callihan would call out Miguel, applauding him for his work at Hardcore Justice and asked that he join him. Miguel refused before Callihan revealed he attacked Tommy Dreamer to make sure Miguel got a place in the main event. Miguel refused to shake Callihan's hand once more before he was blindsided, but still got up from it. The tension between the rivals would now culminate in a Last Man Standing match at Rebellion.

At Turning Point on November 14, 2020, Eric Young attacked The Deaners (Cody Deaner and Cousin Jake) with his enforcer Joe Doering, who returned to the company after appearing at One Night Only: March Breakdown over two years ago. For the next several months, Young and Doering ran roughshod through the Impact locker room, attacking anyone they please (including Rhino while taking out his tag team partner Heath). Young constantly claimed that the wrestling world is "sick" and that they are the cure, and that "This world doesn't belong to you [fans], it belongs to us [i.e. Young and Doering]". Young's cause would gain a new member in Cody Deaner, who with Cousin Jake bore the brunt of Young and Doering's ambushes, and finally turned on his cousin at Final Resolution. Young, Doering, and the now-shortened Deaner, collectively known as Violent By Design (VBD), would defeat Jake, Rhino, and Tommy Dreamer in a six-man tag team match at Hard To Kill. At Sacrifice, Rhino joined the group. On the March 30 episode of Impact, James Storm, accompanied by Chris Sabin, the rechristened Jake Something, and Storm's old AMW tag team partner Chris Harris, defeated Young, accompanied by VBD, in Storm's 1000th match in the company. VBD responded the next week by invading Johnny Swinger's backstage casino "Swinger's Palace" and attacked Harris. At Hardcore Justice, VBD won a Hardcore War against Eddie Edwards, Rich Swann, Willie Mack, and Trey Miguel (subbing for Tommy Dreamer, who was jumped earlier by who is now known as Sami Callihan). On the Impact following Hardcore Justice; Sabin, Edwards, Storm, and Mack united to take down Violent By Design, causing an eight-man tag team match to be made at Rebellion. At the event, Young's pre-existing knee injury was acknowledged, and he handpicked W. Morrissey, formerly known as Colin "Big Cass" Cassidy in WWE, to replace him.

On the Impact after Hardcore Justice, after losing to Impact Knockouts Champion Deonna Purrazzo in a Title vs. Career match, Jazz held her retirement ceremony along with Jordynne Grace. However, the duo would end up being interrupted by Impact Knockouts Tag Team Champions Fire 'N Flava (Kiera Hogan and Tasha Steelz). Jazz and Grace would defeat the champions in an impromptu non-title match before resuming the ceremony, to which Scott D'Amore gave the duo another opportunity for the titles at Rebellion (after Grace and Jazz previously failed to capture them at Sacrifice). Jazz, though, claimed she was a woman of her word and she would stay retired starting that day. She would say to Grace that she has someone in mind for her to partner with at Rebellion. The next week on Impact, after Grace defeated Hogan by disqualification, the debuting Rachael Ellering came out to make the save, confirming her as Grace's tag team partner.

== Results ==
No.	Results	Stipulations	Times
1^{P}	Rosemary and Havok defeated Kimber Lee and Susan by pinfall	Tag team match	7:08
2	Josh Alexander defeated Ace Austin (c) (with Madman Fulton) and TJP by pinfall	Triple Threat match for the Impact X Division Championship	11:15
3	Violent By Design (Deaner, Joe Doering and Rhino) and W. Morrissey (with Eric Young) defeated Chris Sabin, Eddie Edwards, James Storm, and Willie Mack by pinfall	Eight man tag team match	10:05
4	Brian Myers defeated Matt Cardona by pinfall	Singles match	9:45
5	Jordynne Grace and Rachael Ellering (with Jazz) defeated Fire 'N Flava (Kiera Hogan and Tasha Steelz) (c) by pinfall	Tag team match for the Impact Knockouts Tag Team Championship	9:20
6	Trey Miguel defeated Sami Callihan	Last Man Standing match	15:25
7	FinJuice (David Finlay and Juice Robinson) (c) defeated The Good Brothers (Doc Gallows and Karl Anderson) by pinfall	Tag team match for the Impact World Tag Team Championship	10:35
8	Deonna Purrazzo (c) (with Kimber Lee and Susan) defeated Tenille Dashwood (with Kaleb with a K) by pinfall	Singles match for the Impact Knockouts Championship	9:45
9	Kenny Omega (AEW) (with Don Callis, Doc Gallows and Karl Anderson) defeated Rich Swann (Impact) (with Eddie Edwards and Willie Mack) by pinfall	Winner Takes All match for the Impact World Championship and the AEW World Championship	23:00
(c) / – the champion(s) heading into the match; P / – the match was broadcast on the pre-show
