= Slammiversary (2020) =

2020 Impact Wrestling pay-per-view event

- Promotional poster featuring Ace Austin, Eddie Edwards, and Trey
- Promotion: Impact Wrestling
- Date: July 18, 2020
- City: Nashville, Tennessee
- Venue: Skyway Studios
- Attendance: 0 (behind closed doors) (Note: The event was held without a paying audience due to the COVID-19 pandemic in the United States.)

Pay-per-view chronology
← Previous; TNA: There's No Place Like Home (cancelled)	Next → Bound for Glory

Slammiversary chronology
← Previous; XVII	Next → 2021

The 2020 Slammiversary was a professional wrestling pay-per-view (PPV) event produced by Impact Wrestling. It took place on July 18, 2020, at the Skyway Studios in Nashville, Tennessee. It was the sixteenth event under the Slammiversary chronology.

Seven matches were contested at the event. In the main event, Eddie Edwards defeated Ace Austin, Trey, Eric Young, and Rich Swann (the last two being unannounced participants) in a five-way elimination match to win the vacant Impact World Championship. In other prominent matches, Chris Bey defeated Willie Mack to win the Impact X Division Championship, and Deonna Purrazzo defeated Jordynne Grace by submission to capture the Impact Knockouts Championship. The event also marked the Impact debut of Heath and the return of The Motor City Machine Guns (Alex Shelley and Chris Sabin).

== Production ==
Other on-screen personnel
Commentator	Josh Mathews
Commentator	Don Callis
Ring announcer	David Penzer
Referee	Brandon Tolle
Referee	Daniel Spencer
Interviewers	Gia Miller

=== Background ===
On the June 2, 2020, episode of Impact!, it was announced that Slammiversary would take place on July 18, 2020. It took take place (with no fans) at Skyway Studios in Nashville, Tennessee, which was Impact's home base during the bulk of the COVID-19 pandemic.

=== Storylines ===
The event will feature professional wrestling matches that involves different wrestlers from pre-existing scripted feuds and storylines. Wrestlers portrayed villains, heroes, or less distinguishable characters in scripted events that build tension and culminate in a wrestling match or series of matches.

On Night 2 of Rebellion, Tessa Blanchard was due to defend the Impact World Championship against Michael Elgin and Eddie Edwards in a three-way intergender match. However, due to Blanchard and Edwards being stuck in lockdowns in Mexico and Massachusetts respectively as a result of the ongoing COVID-19 pandemic, the match was unable to take place, and Elgin faced Moose and Hernandez in a three-way match instead, which Moose won. On the May 5, 2020, episode of Impact!, it was announced that an eight-man tournament would take place to determine the number one contender for the Impact World Championship. Ace Austin won the tournament during the June 2 episode of Impact! after defeating Wentz, who stood in for Trey after he was attacked before the match, in the tournament final. However, on the following week's episode, it was announced that Blanchard would defend her title against Elgin, Edwards, Austin and Trey in a five-way intergender match at Slammiversary.

On June 22, Impact Wrestling released a statement announcing that alongside the termination of Dave Crist and Joey Ryan's contracts with the promotion, that Elgin had been suspended indefinitely pending a further investigation into allegations of sexual assault made against him. Four days later, Impact released additional statements announcing that both Blanchard and Elgin had their contracts terminated with the promotion, the former being stripped of her Impact World Championship and the latter being a result of the allegations. On the June 30 episode of Impact!, it was announced that Austin, Edwards, Trey, and a mystery opponent will face each other in a four-way match for the vacant title at Slammiversary.

On the June 9 episode of Impact!, Deonna Purrazzo made her return to the company, attacking Knockouts Champion Jordynne Grace after Grace successfully defended the title against Taya Valkyrie. The following week, Purrazzo interrupted Grace's backstage interview and once again attacked her. On the June 23 episode of Impact!, it was announced that Grace will defend the Knockouts title against Purrazzo at Slammiversary.

On Night 1 of Rebellion, Willie Mack defeated Ace Austin to win the X Division Championship, whereas the following week on Night 2, rising star Chris Bey won an X Division four-way match involving Rohit Raju, Suicide, and Trey. After the match, Bey went backstage to state that he deserved to be the #1 contender to the X Division Championship; a match he would get on the May 5 edition of Impact! in a three-way match also involving Austin, but Mack retained the title. Two weeks later on May 19, Mack retained the title by defeating Johnny Swinger, after the latter was told by Bey the previous week that Mack was saying things behind his back. However, after the match, Bey came out and assisted Swinger in a beatdown of Mack. The two eventually formed a team, that Swinger called "The Finesse and Bench Press Express"; though it was mostly as a way to get Bey to another X Division title shot. On the June 23 edition of Impact!, Bey, Swinger, and Raju defeated Mack and The Deaners (Cody and Cousin Jake) in a six-man tag team match after Bey pinned Mack. Two days later, Impact announced that Mack will defend the X Division Championship against Bey at Slammiversary, with Swinger banned from ringside.

On June 29, Impact Wrestling announced a Knockouts gauntlet match for Slammiversary, with the winner becoming the #1 contender to the Knockouts Championship. Rosemary, Nevaeh, Susie, Kiera Hogan, Taya Valkyrie, Tasha Steelz, Alisha Edwards, Kylie Rae, Kimber Lee and Havok were announced to compete in the match. On the July 7 edition of Impact!, former TNA Knockouts Champion Madison Rayne announced during an episode of her chat show, "Locker Room Talk", that she would be returning to the ring to also compete in the gauntlet match.

On the March 17 edition of Impact!, Sami Callihan returned to Impact Wrestling as the mysterious ICU hacker, and launched a fireball into the face of Impact Hall of Fame-designate Ken Shamrock. The feud would culminate on Night 1 of Rebellion in an unsanctioned match, where Shamrock submitted Callihan to an ankle lock. Several weeks later on May 12, Shamrock appeared on "Locker Room Talk" with Madison Rayne and Johnny Swinger, only to be attacked by Michael Elgin, taking him out of the Impact World Championship #1 contender's tournament; whereas the following week, Elgin defeated a noticeably limping Callihan in the first round. The two kept their issues with Elgin going, from Callihan distracting him during his semi-final tournament match with Trey, to an in-ring promo between Elgin and Shamrock, and a three-way match won by Elgin. On those same weeks, The North (Josh Alexander and Ethan Page) had defended the World Tag Team Championships in Canada against questionable challengers, including against Cody Deaner and Wheels Deaner at the Deaner Compound. They eventually returned on the June 16 Impact! to defeat The Rascalz (Dez and Wentz) in a title match. Unfortunately, no one was watching backstage, and were instead watching Ken Shamrock's Greatest Hits on Impact Plus. The next week, Page went on about people watching Shamrock instead of them, leading to Shamrock challenging Alexander to a match that night. However, The North would attack Shamrock before he even got in the ring. The following week, The North came to address their assault, only for Shamrock to come out looking for a fight. He was eventually joined by Callihan, fighting off The North alongside his rival before disappearing into the night. Impact EVP Scott D'Amore, looking to appease to an irate Page, scheduled a tag team title match between The North and the team of Shamrock and Callihan for Slammiversary.

On Night 2 of Rebellion 2020, Moose interrupted Michael Elgin while wearing the old TNA World Heavyweight Championship. Defeating Elgin and Hernandez in three-way match, Moose would proclaim himself TNA World Heavyweight Champion, doing everything to make sure everyone knew it, from pulling out of the Impact World Championship #1 Contender's Tournament, to defending the title against TNA Originals. He defended it against Hernandez, Suicide twice, and Crazzy Steve. After the match with Steve, Tommy Dreamer came down to check on the injured challenger, but Moose attacked Dreamer. Once Dreamer recovered from the assault, he cut a promo on Moose, claiming that he "lacked the passion and drive for his profession, despite having the God-given natural talent". He went on to criticize him for creating a title for himself because he couldn't win any, (despite Moose winning the now-defunct Impact Grand Championship twice), and stated that he would be "a footnote in both the National Football League and professional wrestling" and calling him "a waste of talent". Moose responded by calling Dreamer's comments slanderous and defaming of his character, threatening to sue him and the company unless he was given an apology. The next week, Dreamer formally gave Moose a written apology, albeit with some backhanded remarks that poked at Moose's delusional behavior. Moose would interrupt him, but then told Dreamer that the "TNA Championship Committee" proclaimed him the #1 contender to the TNA World Heavyweight Championship. After the confrontation, Impact announced that Dreamer and Moose would face each other for the TNA World Heavyweight title at Slammiversary in an Old School Rules match.

On April 16, WWE announced that several of their talent, both on-air and recruits, as well as much backstage personnel, were released from their contracts. On June 1, Impact Wrestling released a video on their YouTube channel to promote Slammiversary, featuring a hooded figure drinking and watching the news being broken about said people being released while flashing images of both former Impact and WWE wrestlers, teasing the returns of some of them, including at least one former World Champion. Many names were teased, including the reunion of Team Canada with Michael Elgin, Heath Slater, D'Lo Brown reuniting Aces & Eights, Luke Gallows and Karl Anderson, and Super Eric. At the end of the July 7 edition of Impact!, it was revealed that the former World Champion wouldn't be alone, before ending the vignette with three hands grabbing glasses of alcohol.

On July 18, 2020, Gallows and Anderson announced that they had signed two-year contracts with Impact Wrestling and would be appearing at Slammiversary.

== Results ==
No.	Results	Stipulations	Times
1	The Motor City Machine Guns (Alex Shelley and Chris Sabin) defeated The Rascalz (Dez and Wentz) by pinfall	Tag team match	14:17
2	Moose (c) defeated Tommy Dreamer by pinfall	Old School Rules match for the unsanctioned TNA World Heavyweight Championship	11:18
3	Kylie Rae won by last eliminating Taya Valkyrie (Note: The other participants were: Alisha Edwards, Havok, John E. Bravo (who entered twice dressed as Taya Valkyrie and Rosemary in order of appearance), Katie Forbes, Kiera Hogan, Kimber Lee, Nevaeh, Madison Rayne, Rosemary, Susie, and Tasha Steelz)	Gauntlet for the Gold match to determine the #1 contender for the Impact Knockouts Championship	19:20
4	Chris Bey defeated Willie Mack (c) by pinfall	Singles match for the Impact X Division Championship	10:01
5	The North (Ethan Page and Josh Alexander) (c) defeated Ken Shamrock and Sami Callihan by pinfall	Tag team match for the Impact Tag Team Championship	15:56
6	Deonna Purrazzo defeated Jordynne Grace (c) by submission	Singles match for the Impact Knockouts Championship	15:12
7	Eddie Edwards defeated Ace Austin, Eric Young, Rich Swann and Trey by pinfall	Five-way elimination match for the vacant Impact World Championship; This was Edwards' Call Your Shot championship match.	24:25
(c) / – the champion(s) heading into the match

=== Impact World Championship match ===
Eliminated	Wrestler	Eliminated by	Method of elimination	Time
1	Trey	Eric Young	Pinned after a piledriver	9:35
2	Eric Young	Rich Swann	Pinned with a victory roll	15:38
3	Rich Swann	Ace Austin	Pinned after The Fold	18:53
4	Ace Austin	Eddie Edwards	Pinned after the Die Hard Flowsion	24:25
Winner	Eddie Edwards	—N/a		24:25
