= Violent By Design (professional wrestling) =

Professional wrestling stable

- The logo of Violent By Design The logo of The Design

Statistics
- Leader(s): Eric Young (I); Deaner (II)
- Members: Joe Doering; Rhino; Angels; Kon; Callihan
- Name(s): Violent By Design; The Design
- Billed heights: Young: 5 ft 11 in (1.80 m); Deaner: 6 ft 0 in (1.83 m); Doering: 6 ft 8 in (1.95 m); Rhino: 5 ft 10 in (1.78 m); Angels: 5 ft 8 in (1.73 m); Kon: 6 ft 5 in (1.95 m); Callihan: 5 ft 9 in (1.75 m)
- Combined billed weight: 1,132 lb (513 kg)
- Debut: November 14, 2020
- Disbanded: February 1, 2024
- Years active: 2020–2024

Violent By Design, also known as The Design, was a villainous professional wrestling stable in Impact Wrestling. The stable was originally led by Eric Young, and later by Deaner. The group also consisted of Joe Doering and Rhino, and later Kon, Alan Angels, and Sami Callihan under Deaner's leadership. They are former two-time Impact World Tag Team Champions.

Violent By Design was formed on November 14, 2020, at the Turning Point event, where Doering debuted as Young's enforcer. The stable would later be expanded with the additions of Deaner and Rhino. Rhino was kicked out of the stable in September 2021. After Joe Doering's brain cancer returned, he would go on hiatus from professional wrestling in August 2022. After weeks of teasing new members, Angels and Kon would join in November 2022. In December 2022, Deaner would become the leader of The Design, with Callihan joining for a short time. The stable disbanded in February 2024.

== History ==
=== Beginnings ===
At the Slammiversary event on July 18, 2020, Eric Young made his surprise return to Impact Wrestling as a surprise participant in a match for the vacant Impact World Championship, but he lost the match. He would win the title in September, only to lose it a month later to Rich Swann at Bound for Glory.

Shortly after losing the title, Joe Doering debuted as Young's enforcer at Turning Point and attacked The Deaners (Cody Deaner and Cousin Jake). During the following weeks, Young feuded with Deaner and Rhino and this resulted in a match between Deaner and Young on the December 8 episode of Impact!, which Young won, and a match at Final Resolution, between Young and Rhino, which Young won after Deaner turned on his partners and joined Young.

On the January 5, 2021 episode of Impact!, Deaner appeared in a new look with a bald shaved head, trimmed beard, and the modified name Deaner. At Hard To Kill, the trio was officially named Violent By Design (VBD), as they defeated Dreamer, Rhino, and Jake in an Old School Rules match. On the January 19 episode of Impact!, Young defeated Rhino and proceeded to injure him, taking him out of action. Subsequently, Cousin Jake would change his ring name to Jake Something and defeated Deaner at No Surrender. At Sacrifice, Deaner and Doering defeated Chris Sabin and James Storm in a tag team match after Rhino attacked Sabin, thus joining VBD in the process. At Hardcore Justice, VBD defeated Team Dreamer (Eddie Edwards, Rich Swann, Willie Mack and Trey Miguel) in an eight-man Hardcore War match.

=== Tag Team Champions ===
VBD was scheduled to take on Chris Sabin, Eddie Edwards, James Storm and Willie Mack in an eight-man tag team match at Rebellion but Young suffered an injury and was replaced by the debuting W. Morrissey. Morrisey and VBD went on to win the match. On the May 20 episode of Impact!, Rhino invoked his Call Your Shot Gauntlet championship privilege as he and Doering defeated FinJuice (David Finlay and Juice Robinson) to win the World Tag Team Championship. On the June 3 episode of Impact!, Young declared the titles belonged to the group collectively, and as VBD leader, he would decide who defended them, thus he and Deaner would also be given a share of the titles under the Freebird Rule. At Against All Odds, Doering defeated All Japan Pro Wrestling (AJPW) rival Satoshi Kojima, and Deaner and Rhino retained the tag team titles against Decay (Black Taurus and Crazzy Steve). On July 17, at Slammiversary, they lost the titles to The Good Brothers (Doc Gallows and Karl Anderson) in a four-way tag team match that also involved Rich Swann and Willie Mack, and Fallah Bahh and No Way.

On August 20, at Emergence, they failed to regain the tag titles in a three-way tag team match that also involved Swann and Mack. After that, Young blamed Rhino for failing to recapture the titles and they tortured him to cure him of "the sickness". On the September 16 episode of Impact!, after losing to Decay, Rhino was attacked by Young, Deaner, and Doering, thus kicking him out of the VBD. On the September 30 episode of Impact, Rhino's former tag team partner Heath saved Rhino from a potential attack by VBD, and Heath then looked to give Rhino a hug afterwards, but Rhino would walk out of the ring. In the following weeks, Rhino was not sure which side to take, and Heath asks Impact EVP Scott D'Amore to make a match pitting him and anyone else against Violent By Design at Bound for Glory, which was accepted. At Bound for Glory, Rhino appeared as Heath's tag team partner, where they defeated VBD. On November 20, at Turning Point, Doering and a recovered Young defeated Heath and Rhino in a rematch.

On January 8, 2022, at Hard To Kill, VBD teamed with The Good Brothers to take on Eddie Edwards, Rich Swann, Willie Mack, Heath and Rhino in a 10-man Hardcore War match in a losing effort. In February, they continued their partnership with The Good Brothers during their feud with Bullet Club (Jay White and the Guerillas of Destiny (Tama Tonga and Tanga Loa)), attacking them from behind after a match. At No Surrender, Young lost to White in a match of faction leaders. On March 5, at Sacrifice, VBD defeated The Good Brothers to win the Impact World Tag Team Championship for the second time. At Rebellion, they successfully retained the tag titles in an Eight-Team Elimination Challenge. On May 7, at Under Siege, VBD lost the titles to The Briscoes (Jay Briscoe and Mark Briscoe). On the May 12 episode of Impact!, Young won a Gauntlet for the Gold to get an Impact World Championship match against Josh Alexander at Slammiversary. At the event, Young failed to defeat Alexander for the title. On July 1, at Against All Odds, Doering fought Alexander for the title in a losing effort, thus ending Doering's undefeated streak in Impact Wrestling.

In September, Doering would go on hiatus from professional wrestling after his brain cancer returned. On the November 3 episode of Impact!, Angels and Kon joined the stable.

=== Deaner's takeover and dissolution ===
On the December 1 episode of Impact, Deaner defeated Young in a cinematic prison fight (where it was implied Deaner stabbed him with a shiv) after Young convinced him to do it when Deaner hesitated, thus becoming the new leader of the group (in reality, he departed the company upon the expiry of his contract). The following week, Deaner, Kon, and Angels renamed their group The Design.

After spending the bulk of December feuding with the group, on the January 12, 2023 episode of Impact, Sami Callihan decided to join The Design, having Deaner shave his head as initiation and being renamed simply as Callihan. On April 16 at Rebellion, Callihan turned on The Design by hitting Deaner with a baseball bat.

On February 1, 2024, Deaner officially dissolved The Design, stating that it was his attempt to resurrect VBD, but no matter what he did, he couldn't bring it back to life. He lost a match to PCO and was attacked by Kon right after.

== Members ==
*	Founding member
I–II	Leader(s)

Member		Joined	Left
Eric Young	* I	November 14, 2020	December 1, 2022
Joe Doering	*	November 14, 2020	August 25, 2022
Deaner	II	January 5, 2021	February 1, 2024
Rhino		March 13, 2021	September 26, 2021
Kon		November 3, 2022	February 1, 2024
Angels		November 3, 2022	July 6, 2023
Callihan		January 12, 2023	April 16, 2023

== Championships and accomplishments ==
- Impact Wrestling
  - Impact World Tag Team Championship (2 times) – Young, Doering, Deaner, and Rhino (1); Young, Doering, and Deaner (1)
  - Gauntlet for the Gold (2022 – Heavyweight) – Young
