= Hardcore Justice (2021) =

2021 Impact Wrestling event

- Promotional poster
- Promotion: Impact Wrestling
- Date: April 10, 2021
- City: Nashville, Tennessee
- Venue: Skyway Studios
- Attendance: 0 (behind closed doors) (Note: The event was held without a paying audience due to the COVID-19 pandemic in the United States.)

Impact Plus Monthly Specials chronology
← Previous; Sacrifice	Next → Under Siege

Hardcore Justice chronology
← Previous; 2015	Next → —

The 2021 Hardcore Justice was a professional wrestling event produced by Impact Wrestling. It took place on April 10, 2021, at the Skyway Studios in Nashville, Tennessee, and aired exclusively on Impact Plus. It was the 12th event in the Hardcore Justice chronology, the first to be held since the 2015 event, and the first purchase-only event since the 2012 event.

Nine matches were contested at the event. In the main event, Violent By Design (Eric Young, Deaner, Joe Doering, and Rhino) defeated Team Dreamer (Eddie Edwards, Rich Swann, Willie Mack, and Trey Miguel) in an eight-man Hardcore War match. In other prominent matches, Deonna Purrazzo successfully retained her Impact Knockouts Championship against Jazz in an Old School Rules Title vs. Career match, where Jazz had to retire from in-ring competition, and Tenille Dashwood won a Weapons match to become the number one contender for the Knockouts Championship.

The event garnered mixed reviews from critics, who praised the three-way tag team opening bout, the Knockouts title match, and the Hardcore War main event, but criticized the show's length and stale hardcore stipulations.

== Production ==
=== Background ===
Hardcore Justice is an annual professional wrestling event produced by Impact Wrestling. In 2005, it was originally introduced as a pay-per-view (PPV) event held by Impact Wrestling (then known as Total Nonstop Action Wrestling, TNA). The first event was held in May 2005, and from 2006 to 2012, all events were held in August. The event was known as Hard Justice until 2010. In 2013, TNA dropped Hardcore Justice as a pay-per-view event after announcing that only four pay-per-view events would take place through the year, and it was retained as a special episode of TNA's weekly broadcast, Impact!.

On the Impact! Following Sacrifice, Tommy Dreamer came into the office of Impact Executive Vice President Scott D'Amore, saying that Impact has a problem with its Impact World Tag Team Championship being held hostage outside of the promotion for a month. D'Amore stalled him, then reminded him of the upcoming Hardcore Justice event on Impact Plus, and he let Dreamer book the card for the show.

=== Storylines ===
The event featured professional wrestling matches involving different wrestlers from preexisting scripted feuds and storylines. Wrestlers portray heroes, villains, or less distinguishable characters in scripted events that build tension and culminate in a wrestling match or series of matches.

On the March 23 episode of Impact!, Impact Knockouts Champion Deonna Purrazzo defeated Jazz in a non-title match, with interference from Susan. The following week, while Purrazzo and Susan were having an interview, Jazz attacked them. Jazz would later go to Tommy Dreamer, demanding that she get her hands on Purrazzo. Dreamer would have the two booked for Hardcore Justice, but before that, he talked about how he and Jazz used to be in Extreme Championship Wrestling (ECW) and how they used to have Ultimate Jeopardy matches in ECW. As a match in which all participants wager something, Dreamer asked Jazz to put something at stake, while Purrazzo put her championship on the line. Jazz proclaimed that she is willing to put her career on the line for the title, officially making it a Title vs. Career match.

On the March 30 episode of Impact!, Dreamer held a meeting of various knockouts, announcing a weapons match for Hardcore Justice, with the winner receiving an opportunity for the Impact Knockouts Championship at Rebellion. Alisha Edwards, Havok, Jordynne Grace, Rosemary, Susan, and Tenille Dashwood were announced as participants.

On the March 23 episode of Impact!, Eddie Edwards kicked The Good Brothers (Doc Gallows and Karl Anderson) out of the locker room, seeing how their friendship with AEW World Champion Kenny Omega did not make them "one of the boys". Just as they were about to leave, they encountered Decay (Black Taurus and Crazzy Steve), who mocked how The Good Brothers lost both their tag team titles and the respect of the locker room. On the April 8 episode of Impact!, a match between Black Taurus and Doc Gallows was scheduled for Hardcore Justice.

It was announced that Hardcore Justice will also play host to a Hardcore Blindfold match between Jake Something and Brian Myers. Myers has been wearing an eyepatch since January, after a match with Fallah Bahh, who saw him being "poked" in the eye. On the April 8 episode of Impact!, Myers attacked both Something and his old friend-turned-enemy Matt Cardona, where he accepted Cardona's offer for a match at Rebellion, but not before pushing Something into the steel steps, which had clipped his eye. The Hardcore Blindfold match, essentially a blindfold match with hardcore rules, was scheduled not long after.

On the April 8 episode of Impact!, Tommy Dreamer booked an eight-man tag team Hardcore War featuring himself and three men of his choosing (revealed as Eddie Edwards, Willie Mack, and Impact World Champion Rich Swann) against Violent By Design (Eric Young, Deaner, Joe Doering, and Rhino). The rules of Hardcore War are as follows:

- Two men start alone for five minutes
- Every two minutes, a new man appears from alternating teams
- The match cannot end until the final man has entered
- After all eight men have entered, the match is won by pinfall or submission
- There are no disqualifications

== Reception ==
Jack Irene of 411Mania reviewed the event and gave it a 5 out of 10. He wrote that: "[T]his show was not my favorite. Despite the quality opener and main event, this show dragged, and while it felt different from other IMPACT Plus events, it got stale quickly. It wasn't a complete miss with everything Johnny Swinger touching being great, some decent hardcore action, and fresh matchups. This show met my expectations, and not in a very good way." Bob Kapur of Slam Wrestling gave praise to the three-way tag team opener, the Purrazzo-Jazz Knockouts title match, and the Hardcore War main event, but felt the rest of the show "fell flat – or worse, was just plain bad." He gave the event 2 out of 5 stars, saying: "With highlights coming few and far between, this was a disappointing offering by Impact. Scrapping this show entirely and instead just focusing energies on the Rebellion PPV in two weeks would have been a better idea." Darrin Lilly of PWTorch called it: "Yet another good Impact Plus special. This was quite the prelude to WrestleMania. Nothing was too newsworthy, but there was good action throughout. The show was highlighted by Jazz's retirement match, Johnny Swinger's antics, the Cardona/Myers angle, the Knockouts weapons match, and the main event. Good effort by all."

== Aftermath ==
On the April 15 episode of Impact!, Eddie Edwards and Willie Mack were in the ring, addressing their loss to Violent By Design (VBD) at Hardcore Justice, and called them out for a challenge and accused them of attacking Tommy Dreamer during the show. VBD came out, and Eric Young explained to Edwards that he had nothing to do with Dreamer being laid out before Hardcore War. VBD then surround the ring to attack Edwards and Mack, but Chris Sabin and James Storm arrive to chase them away. As VBD retreats up the ramp, Storm challenges them against the men in the ring to a match at Rebellion. After the show, Impact announced that the eight-man tag team match would take place at the event.

On the April 15 episode of Impact!, a retirement ceremony was held for Jazz but was interrupted by Impact Knockouts Tag Team Champions Fire 'N Flava (Kiera Hogan and Tasha Steelz), leading to an impromptu non-title match where Jazz teamed with Jordynne Grace to defeat Fire 'N Flava. Following the ceremony, Impact EVP Scott D'Amore berated Fire 'N Flava backstage and booked them to defend the tag titles against Jazz and Grace at Rebellion, but Jazz chose to honor the previous match stipulation and told Grace that she would find a new tag team partner for her at Rebellion. The following week, Grace defeated Hogan by disqualification and was beaten down by her and Steelz, but was saved by the debuting Rachael Ellering, confirming her as Grace's tag team partner.

On the April 15 episode of Impact!, Sami Callihan called out Trey Miguel, congratulated him on his work at Hardcore Justice, and asked that he join him. Miguel refused, and Callihan revealed that he took out Tommy Dreamer, ensuring that Miguel got a spot in the Hardcore War main event. Callihan extends his hand to be shaken but Miguel attacks him instead, with Callihan taking out Miguel with an exploder suplex onto a chair. As Callihan walks up the ramp, Miguel gets to his feet. After the show, Impact announced that Callihan and Miguel will fight each other in a Last Man Standing match at Rebellion.

== Results ==
No.	Results	Stipulations	Times
1	Josh Alexander and Petey Williams defeated TJP and Fallah Bahh, and Ace Austin and Madman Fulton	Triple threat tag team match	13:42
2	Shera defeated Hernandez	Chairly Legal match	9:03
3	Doc Gallows (with Karl Anderson) defeated Black Taurus (with Crazzy Steve)	Singles match	8:59
4	Matt Cardona defeated Johnny Swinger	Mystery Crate match	7:56
5	Sami Callihan defeated Sam Beale	Singles match	4:02
6	Jake Something defeated Brian Myers	Hardcore Blindfold match	5:17
7	Tenille Dashwood defeated Alisha Edwards, Havok, Jordynne Grace, Rosemary, and Su Yung	Weapons match to determine the number one contender for the Impact Knockouts Championship	9:35
8	Deonna Purrazzo (c) defeated Jazz	Old School Rules Title vs. Career match for the Impact Knockouts Championship	12:46
9	Violent By Design (Eric Young, Deaner, Joe Doering and Rhino) defeated Team Dreamer (Eddie Edwards, Rich Swann, Willie Mack and Trey Miguel)	Eight-man Hardcore War match	20:28
(c) / – the champion(s) heading into the match
