= Impact Wrestling Sacrifice (2021) =

2021 Impact Wrestling event

Sacrifice (2021)
- Promotional poster
- Promotion: Impact Wrestling
- Date: March 13, 2021
- City: Nashville, Tennessee
- Venue: Skyway Studios
- Attendance: 0 (behind closed doors) (Note: The event was held without a paying audience due to the COVID-19 pandemic in the United States.)

Impact Plus Monthly Specials chronology
← Previous; No Surrender	Next → Hardcore Justice

Sacrifice chronology
← Previous; 2020	Next → 2022

The 2021 Sacrifice was a professional wrestling event produced by Impact Wrestling. It took place on March 13, 2021, at the Skyway Studios in Nashville, Tennessee. It was the 12th event under the Sacrifice chronology and aired on Impact Plus.

Nine matches were contested at the event. In the main event, Rich Swann defeated Moose to unify the Impact World Championship and the TNA World Heavyweight Championship. In other prominent matches, FinJuice (David Finlay and Juice Robinson) defeated The Good Brothers (Doc Gallows and Karl Anderson) to win the Impact World Tag Team Championship, and Ace Austin defeated TJP to win the Impact X Division Championship.

== Production ==
=== Background ===
Sacrifice is an annual professional wrestling event produced by Impact Wrestling (then known as Total Nonstop Action Wrestling). The first one was held in August 2005, but when the PPV names were shuffled for 2006, it was moved to May. On January 11, 2013, TNA announced that in 2013 will be only four PPVs, dropping Sacrifice. The event would return in 2014 and in 2016, the latter as a special edition of Impact Wrestling. The event would be revived in 2020 as a monthly special for Impact Plus.

=== Storylines ===
The event featured nine professional wrestling matches that involved different wrestlers from pre-existing scripted feuds and storylines. Wrestlers portrayed villains, heroes, or less distinguishable characters in scripted events that build tension and culminate in a wrestling match or series of matches.

The main storyline going into the event is Rich Swann putting his Impact World Championship against self-proclaimed TNA World Heavyweight Champion Moose. Ever since Swann defeated Eric Young at Bound for Glory to win the Impact World Championship, he became a frequent target of Moose, now more dangerous than ever after an undisclosed location fight against EC3. Calling Swann a "secondary champion", Moose would constantly target Swann's friend Willie Mack to goad Swann into a championship unification match. Swann finally relented and gave Moose his chance at the Genesis event, where Moose punished Mack in an "I quit" match. Moose would still have to wait for the match, as Swann, Chris Sabin, and himself (replacing Alex Shelley) teamed in the main event of Hard To Kill, but lost against AEW World Champion Kenny Omega and Impact World Tag Team Champions The Good Brothers (Doc Gallows and Karl Anderson). Even then, Moose still had to wait for his match, as Swann defended his title at No Surrender against Tommy Dreamer. Moose later attacked both men after their match and defeated Dreamer in an Old School Rules match on the following Impact!. He attempted to hold the show hostage the next week, forcing Impact EVP Scott D'Amore to eventually come out and officially sanction Moose's TNA World Heavyweight Championship. Moose would later defend the title against Jake Something, who had just wrestled a tables match with Deaner and was attacked by Moose right after. After Moose defeated Something, Swann came out to save Something from another beating. D'Amore later returned to announce that at Sacrifice, Moose would finally get his chance at Swann for the Impact World Championship, and it would be a championship unification match. On the March 9 episode of Impact!, D'Amore announced that whoever wins the unified championship would face AEW World Champion Kenny Omega at Rebellion in a title vs. title match.

On the February 23 episode of Impact!, Jordynne Grace and Jazz defeated Kimber Lee and Susan to become the number one contenders for the Impact Knockouts Tag Team Championship, held by Fire 'N Flava (Kiera Hogan and Tasha Steelz). Though Fire 'N Flava were confident heading into Sacrifice, Grace and Jazz would remark that they were the only team the champions had not yet beat. This led to Hogan being added to Grace's non-title match against Impact Knockouts Champion Deonna Purrazzo on March 2 episode of Impact!, which Purrazzo won.

After Grace defeated Susan on the February 2 episode of Impact!, she and Jazz would be jumped by Deonna Purrazzo and Kimber Lee. During the melee, former Knockouts Champion ODB made her return to Impact after last wrestling at the previous year's Hard To Kill. ODB, Grace, and Jazz later defeated Purrazzo, Lee, and Susan in a six-woman tag team match at No Surrender, which later spurred on the number one contender's match between the team of Grace and Jazz, and the team of Lee and Susan. After that match, ODB would be attacked backstage, with Purrazzo suspected (and later revealed next week) as the culprit. After Purrazzo defeat Grace and Kiera Hogan in the aforementioned three-way match, ODB would come down and lay Purrazzo out, calling her shot for the Knockouts Championship. A title match between the two was penned for Sacrifice.

After No Surrender, it was announced that New Japan Pro-Wrestling's FinJuice (David Finlay and Juice Robinson) would make their Impact Wrestling debut on the subsequent episode of Impact, where they defeated Reno Scum (Adam Thornstowe and Luster the Legend). After the match, Impact World Tag Team Champions The Good Brothers came out to congratulate as they reminisce about the time when Finlay and Robinson were their young boys back in NJPW. However, FinJuice assured them that they were their own people, having been past holders of the IWGP Tag Team Championship much like Gallows and Anderson. The Good Brothers would later battle XXXL (Acey Romero and Larry D) on the next episode of Impact!, before they and FinJuice teamed up to defeat Reno Scum and XXXL the week after. Backstage, tired of hearing the champions degrading them as baggage carriers, FinJuice later challenged The Good Brothers to a match for the Impact World Tag Team Championship, which was accepted and scheduled for Sacrifice.

At Genesis, Ace Austin defeat Blake Christian in the finals of the 2021 Super X Cup tournament. Believing that the cup would secure him a shot at the Impact X Division Championship, he appeared at Hard To Kill the next week, demanding to be inserted into the title match between Chris Bey, Rohit Raju, and the defending champion Manik (TJP). Instead met with a match against new signee Matt Cardona, Austin would constantly demand from Scott D'Amore a match for the X Division Championship. Austin finally won his chance on the February 23 and March 2 Impact! episodes, teaming with Black Taurus and Bey to defeat Josh Alexander, Trey Miguel, and Willie Mack; and then defeating Bey and Taurus in a three-way match. It was later announced on Impact's website that TJP and Austin will face off at Sacrifice for the X Division Championship.

On the January 19 episode of Impact!, Brian Myers looked to get checked out by the doctor after an eye poke in a match. However, the doctor was checking up on Eddie Edwards after his Barbed Wire Massacre with Sami Callihan at Hard To Kill. Seeing it as unprofessional, Myers challenged Edwards to a match next week, which he won by disqualification when Edwards bit Myers. On the February 2 episode of Impact!, Myers would attack Edwards with a hired gun in Hernandez, denouncing him as unprofessional and a backyard wrestler. Edwards would later be saved by Matt Cardona, it led to a tag team match at No Surrender, where Myers and Hernandez defeated Edwards and Cardona. Edwards and Cardona would face Hernandez on the next two episodes of Impact!, as Myers' lawyer Mark Sterling protected him from competing in Impact, which was deemed "unsafe and unprofessional". On the March 9 episode of Impact!, Sterling even filed a lawsuit against Impact for unsafe working conditions, and Myers stating it can be dropped if Edwards was terminated and his history with the company erased. Instead, Scott D'Amore booked Edwards and Myers in a Hold Harmless match, which has relaxed rules instead of submission match rules that Myers initially thought.

== Results ==
No.	Results	Stipulations	Times
1	Decay (Black Taurus and Crazzy Steve) (with Rosemary) defeated Reno Scum (Adam Thornstowe and Luster The Legend) by pinfall	Tag team match	8:00
2	Tenille Dashwood and Kaleb with a K defeated Havok and Nevaeh by pinfall	Intergender tag team match	6:40
3	Violent By Design (Deaner and Joe Doering) (with Eric Young) defeated Chris Sabin and James Storm (with Jake Something) by pinfall	Tag team match	11:30
4	Eddie Edwards defeated Brian Myers by pinfall	Hold Harmless match	16:50
5	Fire 'N Flava (Kiera Hogan and Tasha Steelz) (c) defeated Jordynne Grace and Jazz by pinfall	Tag team match for the Impact Knockouts Tag Team Championship	10:25
6	Ace Austin (with Madman Fulton) defeated TJP (c) by pinfall	Singles match for the Impact X Division Championship	12:10
7	Deonna Purrazzo (c) defeated ODB by submission	Singles match for the Impact Knockouts Championship	8:30
8	FinJuice (David Finlay and Juice Robinson) defeated The Good Brothers (Doc Gallows and Karl Anderson) (c) by pinfall	Tag team match for the Impact World Tag Team Championship	15:00
9	Rich Swann (Impact) defeated Moose (TNA) by pinfall	Singles match to unify the Impact World Championship and the TNA World Heavyweight Championship (Note: The unified championship, which carries the lineage of the Impact World Championship, was briefly referred to as the Impact Unified World Championship before reverting back to the Impact World Championship.)	20:30
(c) / – the champion(s) heading into the match
