= Impact Wrestling Rebellion (2020) =

2020 Impact Wrestling pay-per-view event

Rebellion (2020)
- Promotion: Impact Wrestling
- Date: April 8–10, 2020 (aired April 21 and 28, 2020)
- City: Nashville, Tennessee
- Venue: Skyway Studios
- Attendance: 0 (behind closed doors) (Note: The event was held without a paying audience due to the COVID-19 pandemic in the United States.)

Rebellion chronology
| ← Previous; 2019 | Next → 2021 |

Impact! special episodes chronology
| ← Previous; Total Nonstop Action Wrestling Special! | Next → Emergence |

The 2020 Rebellion was a professional wrestling television special produced by Impact Wrestling and the second event in the Rebellion chronology. The event was initially slated to air live on pay-per-view on April 19, 2020, but due to the COVID-19 pandemic, the event was moved to a closed set at Skyway Studios in Nashville, Tennessee. It was taped between April 8–10, 2020 and was broadcast on April 21 and 28 as a two-part special episode for the company's weekly television program, Impact!.

The event comprised a total of nine matches, with five occurring on the April 21 broadcast and four on April 28. In the main event of the April 21 broadcast, Ken Shamrock defeated Sami Callihan by technical knockout in an unsanctioned match, while in the main event of the April 28 broadcast, Moose defeated Hernandez and Michael Elgin in a three-way match. After the match, Moose declared himself the TNA World Heavyweight Champion, though was not officially recognized as such until February 23, 2021.

== Production ==
=== Background ===
Other on-screen personnel
| Role | Name |
|---|---|
| Commentators | Josh Mathews |
| Commentators | Madison Rayne |
| Ring announcer | David Penzer |
| Referees | Brandon Tolle |
| Referees | Daniel Spencer |
| Backstage interviewer | Gia Miller |

On January 13, 2020, Impact Wrestling announced on its Twitter account that it would be holding a second Rebellion event in April at Terminal 5 in New York, New York. It was later announced that the event would take place on April 19. However, due to the COVID-19 pandemic, the event was rescheduled and taped on a closed set at Skyway Studios in Nashville, Tennessee between April 8 and 10. It aired on tape delay as a two-part special of Impact! on April 21 and 28.

The event was broadcast on AXS TV in the United States and Fight Network in Canada, both owned by Impact's parent company, Anthem Sports & Entertainment, as well as the company's international broadcast partners, such as Twitch.tv.

Tessa Blanchard had missed the tapings resulting in the scheduled Impact World Championship match to be canceled. She was to defend the title against Eddie Edwards and Michael Elgin in a three-way match.

=== Storylines ===
The card included nine matches, split between the two broadcasts; five on April 21 and four on April 28. The matches resulted from scripted storylines, where wrestlers portrayed heroes, villains, or less distinguishable characters in scripted events that built tension and culminated in a wrestling match or series of matches. Results were predetermined by Impact Wrestling writers, while storylines were produced on their weekly television program, Impact!.

== Results ==
Night 1 (April 21)
| No. | Results | Stipulations | Times |
|---|---|---|---|
| 1 | Rhino, Tommy Dreamer, and Crazzy Steve defeated Ohio Versus Everything (Dave Crist, Jake Crist, and Madman Fulton) by pinfall | Six-man tag team match | 9:33 |
| 2 | The Rascalz (Dez and Wentz) defeated TJP and Fallah Bahh, and XXXL (Acey Romero and Larry D) by pinfall | Three-way tag team match | 11:31 |
| 3 | Willie Mack defeated Ace Austin (c) by pinfall | Singles match for the Impact X Division Championship | 13:25 |
| 4 | Kylie Rae defeated Kiera Hogan by submission | Singles match | 9:18 |
| 5 | Ken Shamrock defeated Sami Callihan by technical knockout | Unsanctioned match | 10:44 |
(c) / – the champion(s) heading into the match

Night 2 (April 28)
| No. | Results | Stipulations | Times |
|---|---|---|---|
| 1 | Chris Bey defeated Rohit Raju, Suicide, and Trey by pinfall | X Division Four-way match | 11:37 |
| 2 | Joseph P. Ryan defeated Cousin Jake by pinfall | Singles match | 10:49 |
| 3 | Rosemary defeated Havok by pinfall | Full Metal Mayhem match | 12:26 |
| 4 | Moose (c) defeated Hernandez and Michael Elgin by pinfall | Three-way match for the TNA World Heavyweight Championship | 13:13 |
(c) / – the champion(s) heading into the match

== Aftermath ==
During the main event of the second night, Moose appeared with the title belt used for the Impact World Championship between 2011 and 2017, a time period when the promotion was known as Total Nonstop Action Wrestling (TNA). After the match, he declared himself the TNA World Heavyweight Champion, but the promotion did not officially recognize Moose as champion until February 23, 2021.
