= Slammiversary (2021) =

2021 Impact Wrestling event

- Promotional poster featuring Kenny Omega and Sami Callihan
- Promotion: Impact Wrestling
- Date: July 17, 2021
- City: Nashville, Tennessee
- Venue: Skyway Studios
- Tagline: Our World Changes Again

Pay-per-view chronology
← Previous; Rebellion	Next → Bound for Glory

Slammiversary chronology
← Previous; 2020	Next → 2022

The 2021 Slammiversary was a professional wrestling pay-per-view (PPV) event produced by Impact Wrestling. It took place on July 17, 2021 at the Skyway Studios in Nashville, Tennessee. It was the 17th event under the Slammiversary chronology.

Nine matches were contested at the event, with one match contested on the pre-show. In the main event, Kenny Omega defeated Sami Callihan to retain the Impact World Championship. In other prominent matches, Deonna Purrazzo defeated Thunder Rosa to retain the Impact Knockouts Championship, and Josh Alexander defeated Ace Austin, Chris Bey, Petey Williams, Rohit Raju, and Trey Miguel in an Ultimate X match to retain the X Division Championship in the opening bout. The event also marked the Impact debuts of Jay White, No Way, and Thunder Rosa, and the returns of Mickie James and Chelsea Green (formerly known as Laurel Van Ness).

== Production ==
=== Background ===
On April 25, 2021 at Rebellion, it was announced by Impact Wrestling that Slammivesary would take place in July 2021 at the Skyway Studios in Nashville, Tennessee. On June 3, Impact Wrestling announced that Slammiversary would be open to a limited number of paying fans, with tickets on sale the following morning. It marked the first time Impact would have ticketed fans in attendance for an event during the COVID-19 pandemic, albeit in a limited capacity; the last Impact event to have ticketed fans was on March 7, 2020, just before the pandemic took effect.

=== Storylines ===
Other on-screen personnel
Commentators	Matt Striker
Commentators	D'Lo Brown
Ring announcer	David Penzer
Referees	Brian Hebner
Referees	Brandon Tolle
Referees	Daniel Spencer
Interviewer	Gia Miller

The event featured professional wrestling matches that involved different wrestlers from pre-existing scripted feuds and storylines. Wrestlers portray heroes, villains, or less distinguishable characters in scripted events that build tension and culminate in a wrestling match or series of matches.

Like the previous year, Impact released a video package to promote Slammiversary, featuring images of various wrestlers who had previously appeared with Impact, stars of partner promotion New Japan Pro-Wrestling and many of whom had been recently released by WWE. Included were Samoa Joe, Mickie James, Chelsea Green (known in Impact as Laurel Van Ness), Kazuchika Okada, No Limit (Tetsuya Naito and Yujiro Takahashi), and The Great Muta; also featured were the flags of Mexico, Australia, and Canada, teasing Samurai Del Sol, The IInspiration, and an unknown third party. On May 20, a new video was released featuring new content, including the logo of Bullet Club, and phrases like a blue and pink "II" (for The IInspiration), "Forgotten" (referencing Steve Cutler and Wesley Blake of The Forgotten Sons), and "YES!" (referring to Bryan Danielson).

On the Impact! before Against All Odds, Impact EVP Scott D'Amore and All Elite Wrestling (AEW) president Tony Khan announced that the winner of the Impact World Championship main event between champion Kenny Omega and challenger Moose will go on to Slammiversary, where they defend the championship against Sami Callihan, who has been attempting to get into the title picture while bearing the brunt of frequent attacks and manipulation from Omega and his allies (The Good Brothers (Doc Gallows and Karl Anderson) and Impact EVP Don Callis). At Against All Odds, Omega retained the title by defeating Moose. After the match, Callihan appeared and attacked The Elite. As Callihan was about to attack Omega, Callis fired Callihan, which upset D'Amore. On the following episode of Impact!, Tommy Dreamer - acting as a spokesman for the Anthem Sports & Entertainment board of directors - announced that the board had reinstated Callihan and fired Callis from his EVP role, making the world title main event official. On July 13, it was announced that they will face off in a No Disqualification match.

At Against All Odds, Petey Williams, Trey Miguel, Ace Austin, Chris Bey, and Rohit Raju competed in a five-way match to determine the number one contender to Josh Alexander's X Division Championship. However, Austin's bodyguard Madman Fulton interfered and attacked all other participants, leading to the match being ruled a no contest. On the June 17 episode of Impact!, it was announced that Alexander will defend the X Division Championship at Slammiversary against all five men in an Ultimate X match, the first to be promoted in over two years.

On the May 6 episode of Impact!, Moose defeated James Storm in a match to qualify for the world title number one contender's six-way match at Under Siege. After the match, Moose would deliberately injure Storm's ankle when he wrapped it in a chair, before Chris Sabin, who had qualified for the Under Siege match earlier in the night, would come and save Storm. On the Impact! after Against All Odds, when Moose tried to hold the show hostage and get Scott D'Amore's attention, Sabin, whose knee was injured by Moose at Under Siege, returned to foil Moose's plans. Backstage, Sabin challenged Moose to a match at Slammiversary, which he accepted.

After parting ways with her former allies Kimber Lee and Susan, and having defeated the pair in back-to-back non-title matches, Impact Knockouts Champion Deonna Purrazzo claimed that there is no one left for her to beat. Later that night, after retaining her title in an open challenge against Lady Frost, seven-time Knockouts Champion and Impact Hall of Famer Gail Kim would confront Purrazzo, stating that she will defend her title at Slammiversary against a mystery opponent of her and Scott D'Amore's choosing.

On the July 1 episode of Impact!, Impact World Tag Team Champions Violent By Design (Eric Young, Deaner, Joe Doering, and Rhino) interrupted a tag team match between the team of Rich Swann and Willie Mack and the team of TJP and Fallah Bahh, a match that had big tag team title implications. The following week on Impact!, when the three teams confronted each other in the ring, they were joined by The Good Brothers, who looked to become the champions once again. Impact's new advisor Tommy Dreamer then appeared, stating that Violent By Design would defend the championship against all challengers in a four-way tag team match at Slammiversary. On July 16, it was announced that TJP was removed from the match.

Following the June 24 episode of Impact!, after failing to capture the Impact World Tag Team Championship from Violent By Design, Eddie Edwards would challenge his tag team partner Satoshi Kojima to a match the following week. However, as the challenge was accepted, W. Morrissey would intrude on their conversation, calling the pair a couple of frauds - for Morrissey believes professional wrestling is all about looking out for one's self, and not having any "real friends". The following week on Impact!, while Kojima waited for Edwards to enter the ring, Morrissey appeared on the titantron revealing he attacked Edwards in the parking lot. On the July 8 episode of Impact!, before competing in a 3-on-1 handicap match, Morrissey accepted Edwards' challenge for a match at Slammiversary.

On the July 1 episode of Impact!, after conflicting with Impact Knockouts Tag Team Champions Fire 'N Flava (Kiera Hogan and Tasha Steelz), Havok and Rosemary decided to officially challenge for the titles, leaving a tarot card on Scott D'Amore's desk as a notice. However, Hogan and Steelz felt that they have not earned the opportunity, so D'Amore booked a number one contender's match between Havok and Rosemary, and Kimber Lee and Susan. The following week on Impact!, Havok and Rosemary won the match, making it them against Fire 'N Flava on the Countdown to Slammiversary pre-show.

At Rebellion, Brian Myers defeated former friend Matt Cardona, before Cardona got his win back the following Impact! in doing so getting himself entered into a six-way match to determine the number one contender for the World Championship at Under Siege. Tired of feeling like he has been screwed by Cardona, Myers attacked Cardona backstage on the May 20 episode of Impact! before throwing him into a camera, breaking his orbital bone. On the July 8 episode of Impact!, after Myers and his protégé Sam Beale attacked Jake Something after the latter defeated Myers, Cardona returned for the save. The following week on Impact!, when the four men had an in-ring encounter, Cardona was given a low blow from Tenille Dashwood, who had previous history with Cardona. Scott D'Amore would meet with Cardona backstage, booking an Intergender tag team match for Slammiversary between the team of Cardona and a mystery partner, and the team of Myers and Dashwood.

== Event ==
During the event, Madman Fulton and Shera arrived and angrily confronted the referee for having banned them from ringside during the Ultimate X match where their partners, Austin and Raju respectively, had competed. Scott D'Amore intervened and made an impromptu match, with FinJuice (David Finlay and Juice Robinson) as their opponents. FinJuice won the match.

After Deonna Purrazzo retained her Knockouts Championship against Thunder Rosa, she planned to make a speech but was interrupted by the returning Mickie James.

Following the conclusion of the main event, Kenny Omega, Don Callis, and The Good Brothers were all celebrating in the ring when Jay White entered and stared them down. In a worked shoot event, the pay-per-view ended abruptly while Striker and Brown were still commentating.

== Results ==
No.	Results	Stipulations	Times
1^{P}	Decay (Havok and Rosemary) (with Black Taurus and Crazzy Steve) defeated Fire 'N Flava (Kiera Hogan and Tasha Steelz) (c) by pinfall	Tag team match for the Impact Knockouts Tag Team Championship	8:55
2	Josh Alexander (c) defeated Ace Austin, Chris Bey, Petey Williams, Rohit Raju, and Trey Miguel	Ultimate X match for the Impact X Division Championship	15:45
3	Matt Cardona and Chelsea Green defeated Brian Myers (with Sam Beale) and Tenille Dashwood (with Kaleb with a K) by pinfall	Intergender tag team match	6:05
4	W. Morrissey defeated Eddie Edwards by pinfall	Singles match	11:00
5	FinJuice (David Finlay and Juice Robinson) defeated Madman Fulton and Shera by pinfall	Tag team match	1:15
6	Chris Sabin defeated Moose by pinfall	Singles match	12:00
7	The Good Brothers (Doc Gallows and Karl Anderson) defeated Violent By Design (Joe Doering and Rhino) (c) (with Eric Young and Deaner), Rich Swann and Willie Mack, and Fallah Bahh and No Way by pinfall	Four-way tag team match for the Impact World Tag Team Championship	10:10
8	Deonna Purrazzo (c) defeated Thunder Rosa by pinfall	Singles match for the Impact Knockouts Championship	10:30
9	Kenny Omega (c) (with Don Callis) defeated Sami Callihan by pinfall	No Disqualification match for the Impact World Championship	27:45
(c) / – the champion(s) heading into the match; P / – the match was broadcast on the pre-show
