= Ace Romero =

American professional wrestler

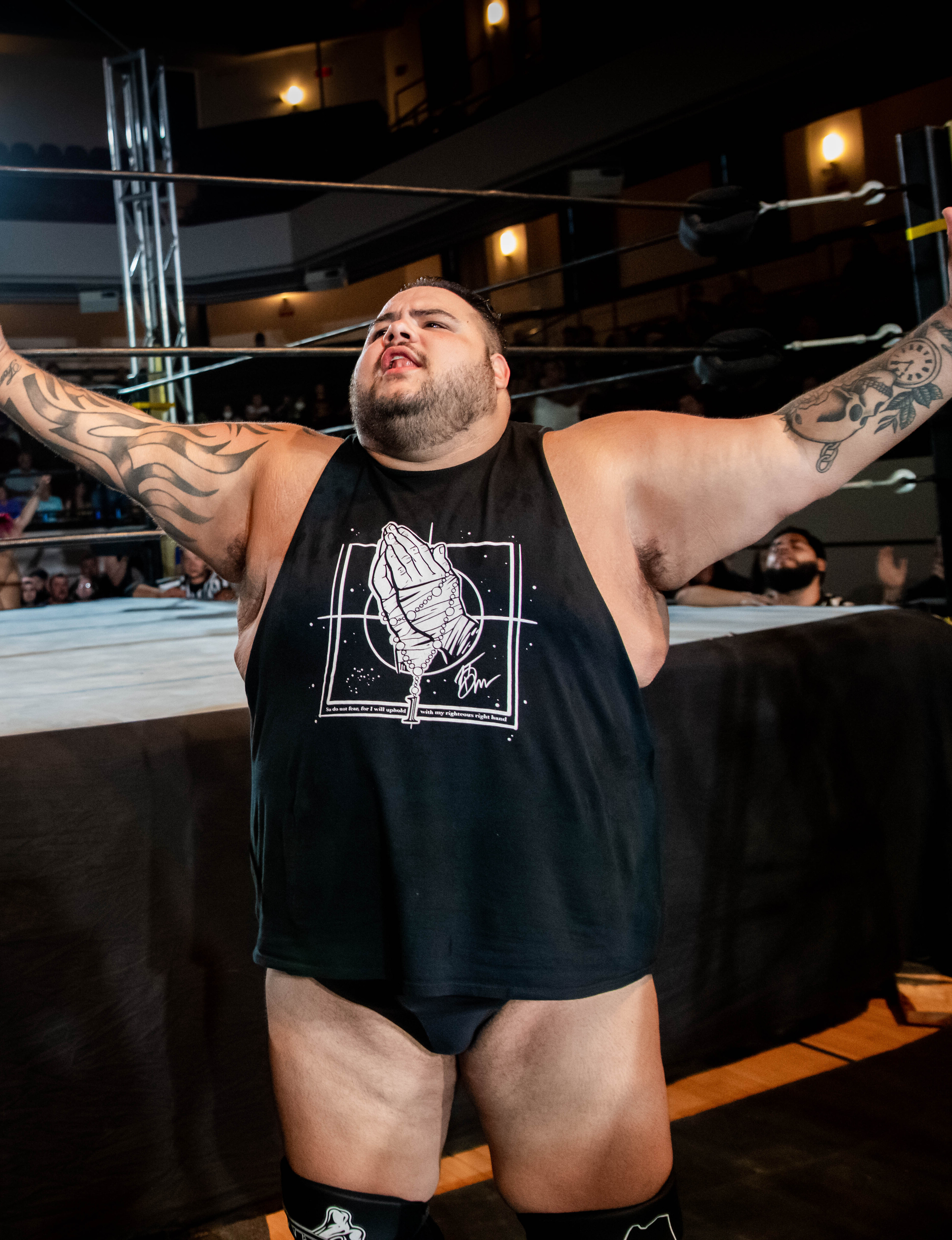
- Romero in 2021

Personal information
- Born: Justin Romero; 1 May 1990 (age 36) Saco, Maine, U.S.

Professional wrestling career
- Ring name(s): Ace Romero; Acey Romero; Acey Baby
- Billed height: 6 ft 0 in (183 cm)
- Billed weight: 376 lb (171 kg)
- Trained by: Oney Lorcan
- Debut: September 6, 2013

Justin Romero (born May 1, 1990) is an American professional wrestler better known by the ring name Ace Romero, He currently performs on the independent circuit. He is best known for his tenure with Impact Wrestling, where he performed under the ring name Acey Romero. He has previously wrestled notably for All Elite Wrestling (AEW), Major League Wrestling (MLW) and Combat Zone Wrestling (CZW).

== Early life ==
Romero was born in Saco, Maine, the first of three children. At the age of four he became a wrestling fan, with The Undertaker being his childhood favorite. In high school he played football and lacrosse at Thornton Academy. During his senior year he was given an essay assignment by his English teacher; "What do you want to do when you grow up?". Romero wrote that he wanted to be a professional wrestler. Romero's mother was a single parent, which didn't allow her time to bring him to a wrestling school. His English teacher, who had encouraged him, helped him by driving him to his first day at wrestling school. Romero was awarded 'best student' during his tryouts and was awarded three-months free tuition at the New England Pro Wrestling Academy.

== Professional wrestling career ==
=== Gay Wrestling (2016-2019) ===
From 2016 to 2019 Ace Romero made gay wrestling videos as The Mountain, for two companies while he was also trying to break into professional wrestling. Wrestler 4 Hire - The Mountain and Muscle Domination Wrestling - The Mountain. He wrestled mainly body builders in skimpy thongs or sometimes they were naked. Even though he wrestled as The Mountain, a number of times he wore his Acey Baby trunks so he was doing gay wrestling videos up until 2019.

=== Major League Wrestling (2018–2019) ===
On December 8, 2018 (which was taped on November 8 at Fightland), Romero made his debut for Major League Wrestling (MLW) on Fusion, defeating Marko Stunt. On the December 28 episode of Fusion, he answered Simon Gotch's Prize Fight Challenge and quickly beat him, throwing some of the $20,000 to the crowd. On the January 25, 2019, episode of Fusion, Romero fought Barrington Hughes to a no contest after Col. Robert Parker interrupted the match and had The Dirty Blondes (Mike Patrick and Leo Brien) attack them, resulting in an impromptu tag team match where Romero and Hughes defeated Parker's team. On the March 9 episode of Fusion, he faced off against Gotch again, winning via disqualification after his Contra Unit (Jacob Fatu and Josef Samael) attacked him. At Battle Riot II on April 5, Romero competed in the Battle Riot match as the tenth entrant, eliminating five competitors before being eliminated by Davey Boy Smith Jr. He would lose to Samael on the April 20 episode of Fusion, getting beat up by the rest of Contra Unit after the match. His final match for MLW happened on the May 25 episode of Fusion, where he teamed up with Hughes to lose to Contra Unit.

=== All Elite Wrestling (2019) ===
On May 25, 2019, Romero made a surprise appearance in the pre-show Casino Battle Royale at the promotion's inaugural event Double or Nothing, eliminating Marko Stunt before being eliminated by Jungle Boy.

=== Impact Wrestling (2019–2021) ===
On October 19, 2019, Romero defeated Larry D in the main event of Impact Wrestling's All Glory special. After the match, he signed a three-year contract with Impact that was offered by Co-Executive Vice President Scott D'Amore, and was given the final spot in the five-way ladder match for the Impact X Division Championship at the following Bound for Glory pay-per-view event. At Bound for Glory, Romero made his televised Impact in-ring debut in the five-way ladder match for the X Division Championship, which was won by Ace Austin. On December 7 at No Surrender, he competed in a five-way Scramble match, that was won by Madman Fulton. Romero made his Impact debut on the December 10 episode of Impact! against Moose in a losing effort, and on the following week lost to Joey Ryan. On February 22, 2020, at Sacrifice, Romero teamed up with Larry D to defeat oVe (Dave Crist and Madman Fulton). On the March 3 episode of Impact!, Romero picked up his first televised win by defeating Joey Ryan.

Romero solidified his partnership with Larry D on the March 31 episode of Impact!, forming a tag team called "XXXL". On the April 14 episode of Impact!, they made their debut in a four-way tag team match against The Rascalz (Dez and Wentz), Reno Scum (Adam Thornstowe and Luster the Legend) and TJP and Fallah Bahh, the latter winning after TJP pinned Thornstowe. The following week on Night 1 of Rebellion, they fought in a three-way tag team match against The Rascalz and TJP and Fallah Bahh, the former winning after Dez pinned Larry D. On the May 5 episode of Impact!, the team picked up their first televised win by defeating oVe. The following months saw XXXL lose matches against the likes of TJP and Fallah Bahh, Reno Scum and The Deaners (Cody and Cousin Jake), the latter of which they beat up after losing to them in their second encounter.

On the July 28 episode of Impact!, Romero joined with Larry D and a bunch of wrestlers in the reality show Wrestle House. After conducting a truce with The Deaners, he defeated Crazzy Steve in a match, where the winner would get to sleep inside the ring. On the August 11 episode of Impact!, Romero took on Larry D, who was under a love spell by Rosemary, in order to get him back to normal, but was defeated after a knockout punch. On the September 1 episode of Impact!, XXXL continued their feud with The Deaners by brawling all around the house, ending with Susie confronting Cousin Jake for breaking the truce between the two teams and "winning" the match. Romero and the rest of the Wrestle House cast returned to the Impact Zone during Knockouts Champion Deonna Purrazzo's Black Tie Affair. On the September 15 episode of Impact!, XXXL continued their Wrestle House rivalry with The Deaners, defeating them in a tag team match. At Victory Road, they faced The Rascalz in a losing effort, and failed to beat them again on the October 6 episode of Impact!.

At Bound for Glory, Romero took part in the Call Your Shot Gauntlet match, where the winner could choose any championship match of their choice, but was eliminated by Heath. On the October 27 episode of Impact!, XXXL fought against The Rascalz again, this time defeating them. After the match, they entered into a rivalry with the Motor City Machine Guns. On the November 10 episode of Impact!, Romero lost to Chris Sabin after missing a senton and taking three enzuigiris. At Turning Point, XXXL lost against the team of Sabin and James Storm. On the December 1 episode of Impact!, they went up against the Motor City Machine Guns in a losing effort and turned heel. On January 16, 2021, at Hard to Kill, Romero was searching for evidence on Larry D being framed for shooting John E. Bravo at his wedding, leading to the both of them going to Tommy Dreamer on the January 19 episode of Impact!, and arresting Taya Valkyrie for using ring rust cologne to change Larry D to "Lawrence D" and providing him with the gun used to kill Bravo.

On February 13 at No Surrender, XXXL teamed with Tenille Dashwood and lost to Decay (Rosemary, Crazzy Steve and Black Taurus) in a six-person tag team match, and would lose to them again in a regular tag team bout three days later on the premiere episode of Before the Impact. They would lose a non-title bout against Impact World Tag Team Champions The Good Brothers (Doc Gallows and Karl Anderson) on the February 23 episode of Impact!, and an eight-man tag team match with Reno Scum against The Good Brothers and New Japan Pro-Wrestling's FinJuice (David Finlay and Juice Robinson) the following week. On the May 13 episode of Impact!, Romero fought in a six-way match to determine the number one contender for the X Division Championship, which was won by NJPW talent El Phantasmo. Two days later, at Under Siege, XXXL competed in a four-way tag team match to determine who will get a shot at the Impact World Tag Team Championship, which was won by Ace Austin and Madman Fulton.

On August 30, Romero requested his release from Impact Wrestling. On October 12, Impact Wrestling granted his release and Romero departed from the company.

=== Independent circuit (2021–present) ===
On September 24, 2022, at Limitless Wrestling's Chasing Forever event, Romero defeated Alec Price to win the Limitless World Championship for the first time. On March 25, 2023, at Reasonable Doubt, Romero lost the title to BEEF in a three-way match that also involved Rip Byson, ending his reign at 182 days. On December 16, at Force of Nature, Romero failed to recapture the title from Channing Thomas in an Anything Goes match.

== Personal life ==
Romero works as a corrections officer at the Long Creek Youth Development Center in South Portland, Maine.

== Championship and accomplishments ==
- Chaotic Wrestling
  - Chaotic Wrestling Tag Team Championship (1 time) - with Alisha, Danny Miles, J. T. Dunn, Mike Verna and Trigga The OG
- Independent Wrestling Entertainment
  - IWE Heavyweight Championship (1 time)
  - IWE Twin Cities Championship (1 time)
  - IWE Tag Team Championship (2 times) - with Roadblock
- Limitless Wrestling
  - Limitless World Championship (1 time)
  - Vacationland Cup (2018, 2022)
- Pro Wrestling Illustrated
  - Ranked No. 417 of the top 500 singles wrestlers in the PWI 500 in 2019
- Pro Wrestling Magic
  - PWM Championship (1 time)
- Eastern Wrestling Alliance
  - EWA Heavyweight Championship (1 time)
- Rockstar Pro Wrestling
  - Rockstar Pro Trios Championship (1 time) - with Clayton Jackson and Maxwell Jacob Friedman
- Xtreme Wrestling Alliance
  - XWA Firebrand Championship (1 time)
  - XWA Tag Team Championship (2 times) - with Anthony Greene (1, inaugural) and J. T. Dunn (1)
