= FinJuice =

Professional wrestling team

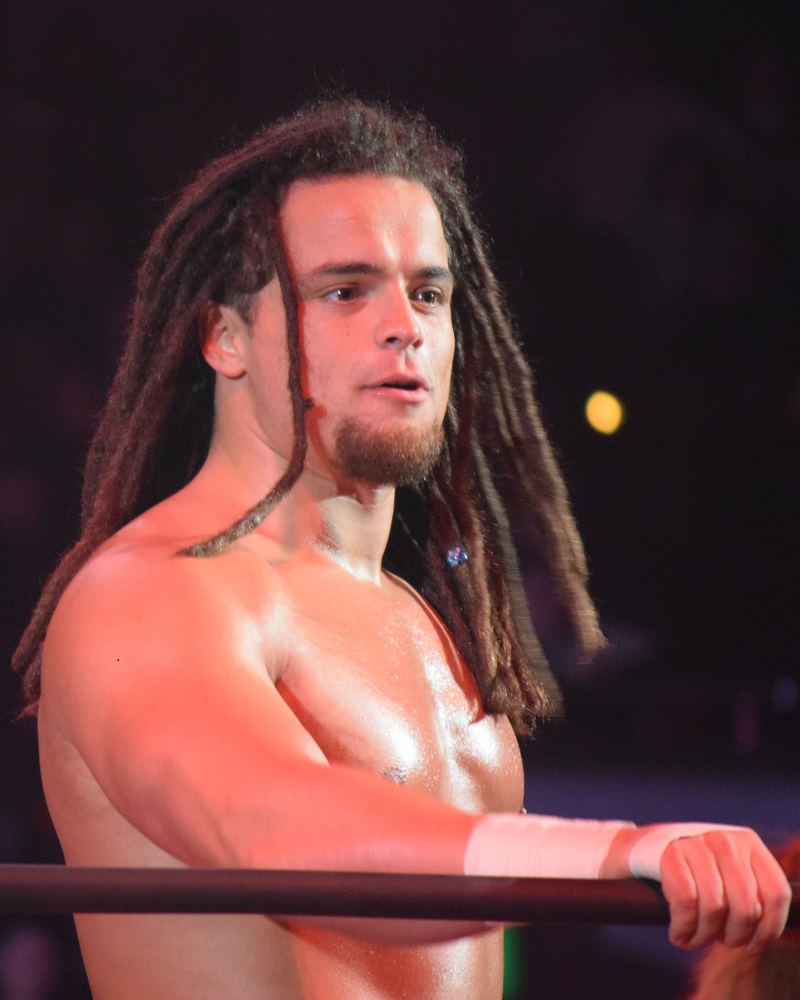
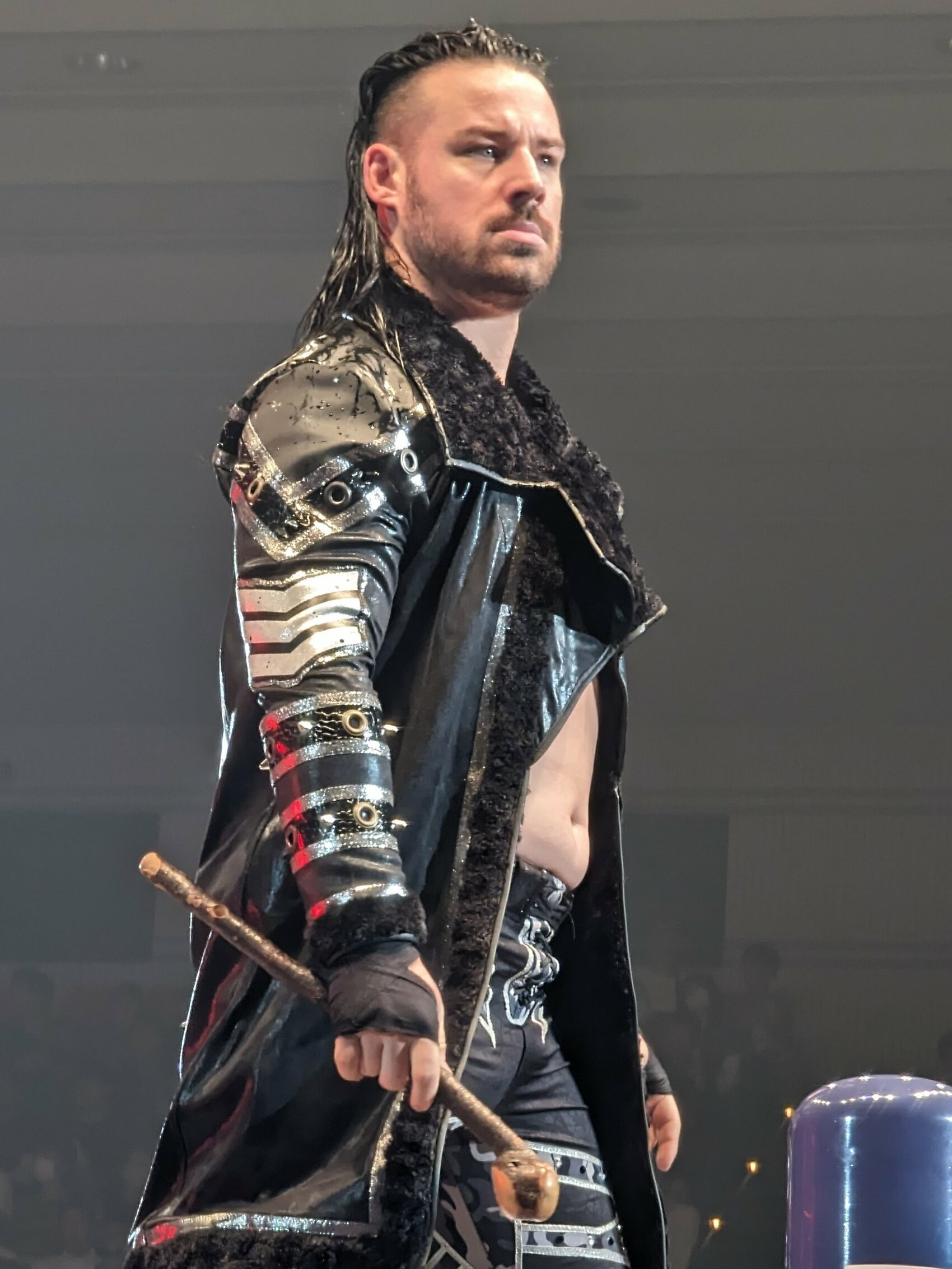
- Robinson (left) and Finlay (right)

Tag team
- Members: Juice Robinson; David Finlay
- Name(s): FinJuice; David Finlay and Juice Robinson
- Billed heights: Robinson: 6 ft 3 in (1.91 m); Finlay: 6 ft 0 in (1.83 m)
- Debut: August 2017
- Years active: 2017–2022
- Trained by: NJPW Dojo

FinJuice was an American professional wrestling tag team consisting of David Finlay and Juice Robinson. The team name consists of Finlay's surname and Robinson's first name Juice. Trained in the dojo of the New Japan Pro-Wrestling promotion, the two came together as a team, in August 2017. In December 2019, the duo won the 2019 World Tag League, followed by the IWGP Tag Team Championship in January 2020 at Wrestle Kingdom 14. FinJuice have also worked for Ring of Honor and Impact Wrestling, where they are former Impact World Tag Team Champions. In 2023, both Finlay and Robinson, became members of Bullet Club branches in different promotions, with Finlay being signed to New Japan Pro-Wrestling (NJPW) as the leader of Bullet Club and BC War Dogs and Robinson to All Elite Wrestling (AEW) as a member of Bullet Club Gold/Bang Bang Gang. In 2026, Finlay and Robinson became members of The Cut.

== History ==
=== New Japan Pro-Wrestling (2017–2022) ===
Both David Finlay and Juice Robinson, entered the New Japan Pro-Wrestling (NJPW) dojo in 2015 and made their debuts for the promotion during the same year. After Finlay and Robinson joined the Taguchi Japan stable in January 2017, Finlay and Robinson formed a tag team named "FinJuice", consisting of Finlay's surname and Robinson's first name Juice. FinJuice worked mostly on the mid-card during the year, sometimes in tag team or multi-man tag matches. On July 7, 2018, at G1 Special in San Francisco, Robinson defeated Jay White to win the IWGP United States Heavyweight Championship. On September 15 at Destruction in Hiroshima, FinJuice teamed with their Taguchi Japan stablemate Ryusuke Taguchi unsuccessfully challenging Bullet Club (Taiji Ishimori, Tama Tonga and Tanga Loa) for the NEVER Openweight 6-Man Tag Team Championship. On September 30 at Fighting Spirit Unleashed, Robinson lost the IWGP United States Heavyweight Championship to Cody. In November, FinJuice took part in the 2018 World Tag League, finishing the tournament with a record of eight wins and five losses, failing to advance to the finals. Their final block match against Best Friends (Beretta and Chuckie T) ended by disqualification, when Chuckie T attacked Finlay with a chair.

On January 4, 2019, at Wrestle Kingdom 13 in Tokyo Dome, Robinson regained the IWGP United States Heavyweight Championship defeating Cody in a rematch. On February 2 on the second night of The New Beginning in USA, Robinson successfully defended the IWGP United States Heavyweight Championship against Beretta. On February 23 in the second night of Honor Rising: Japan, FinJuice unsuccessfully challenged The Briscoe Brothers (Jay Briscoe and Mark Briscoe) for the ROH World Tag Team Championship. During the match, Finlay suffered a shoulder injury, sidelining him for eight months. On June 5, Robinson lost the IWGP United States Heavyweight Championship to the debuting Jon Moxley. At King of Pro-Wrestling, Robinson was defeated by Lance Archer in a no disqualification match for the vacant IWGP United States Heavyweight Championship. After the match, Robinson was attacked by Archer until Finlay returned from injury and made the save. On November 9 at New Japan Showdown in San Jose, Finlay unsuccessfully challenged Archer for the IWGP United States Heavyweight Championship. From November 16 until December 8, Robinson and Finlay took part in the 2019 World Tag League, which the two won by defeating former IWGP Tag Team Champions Los Ingobernables de Japón (EVIL and SANADA) in their last round-robin match.

On January 4, 2020, on the first night of Wrestle Kingdom 14 in Tokyo Dome, Finlay and Robinson defeated the Guerrillas of Destiny (Tama Tonga and Tanga Loa) to win the IWGP Tag Team Championship. They lost the titles back to the Guerrillas of Destiny (Tama Tonga and Tanga Loa) on February 1 at The New Beginning in USA. In August, due to the COVID-19 pandemic in the United States, Finlay and Robinson were unable to work on NJPW events in Japan, leading them to take part in NJPW Strong series. However, due to a leg injury, Robinson was forced to miss the series. Despite Robinson's injury, Finlay reached the finals of the New Japan Cup USA losing to KENTA in the finals on August 21. From November 15 until December 6, Robinson and Finlay took part in the 2020 World Tag League, finishing the tournament with a record of six wins and three losses, advancing to the finals of the tournament. On December 11, Robinson and Finlay were defeated in the finals by Guerrillas of Destiny (Tama Tonga and Tanga Loa).

=== Ring of Honor (2019) ===
In January 2019, FinJuice took part in Ring of Honor (ROH)'s television tapings the formation of Lifeblood, with the goal of bringing honor back to ROH; the stable included Tracy Williams, Bandido, Mark Haskins and Tenille Dashwood. Lifeblood defeated Jay Lethal's handpicked team of Jonathan Gresham, Flip Gordon, Dalton Castle and Jeff Cobb in the main event. Finlay and Robinson, representing Lifeblood, participated in the Tag Wars Tournament. In the first round, they defeated Alex Coughlin and Karl Fredericks, and in the semi-finals, they won in a three-way match over Lethal and Gresham and Coast 2 Coast (LSG and Shaheem Ali). In the final, they were defeated by Villain Enterprises (Brody King and PCO). FinJuice left Ring of Honor in June due to wanting to return to their home promotion New Japan Pro-Wrestling, as well as citing complains about low salary from ROH.

=== Impact Wrestling (2021) ===
On February 13, 2021, at No Surrender, FinJuice appeared on Impact in a pre-taped vignette, announcing that FinJuice would make their debut at the Impact tapings, as part of a partnership between Impact and New Japan Pro-Wrestling. Three days later, on the following week's Impact!, they made their debut and defeated Reno Scum. On March 13, at Sacrifice, FinJuice defeated The Good Brothers (Doc Gallows and Karl Anderson) to win the Impact World Tag Team Championship. They successfully defended their titles against Gallows and Anderson in a rematch at Rebellion. On the May 20 episode of Impact!, FinJuice lost the tag team titles to Violent By Design (Rhino and Joe Doering), ending their reign at 65 days. They would return to the company at Slammiversary, defeating Madman Fulton and Shera.

== Championships and accomplishments ==
- Impact Wrestling
  - Impact World Tag Team Championship (1 time)
- New Japan Pro-Wrestling
  - IWGP United States Heavyweight Championship (2 times) – Robinson
  - IWGP Tag Team Championship (1 time)
  - World Tag League (2019)
