= TNA World Heavyweight Championship (2020–2021) =

American wrestling championship

- The championship was represented by the 2011–2017 TNA World Championship belt

Details
- Promotion: Impact Wrestling
- Date established: April 8–10, 2020 (unofficial; aired April 28); February 23, 2021 (official recognition)
- Date retired: March 13, 2021 (unified with the Impact World Championship)
Statistics
- First champion: Moose
- Final champion: Rich Swann
- Most reigns: All titleholders (1)
- Longest reign: Moose (18 days)
- Shortest reign: Rich Swann (>1 day)
- Oldest champion: Moose (37 years)
- Youngest champion: Rich Swann (30 years)
- Heaviest champion: Moose (295 lb (134 kg))
- Lightest champion: Rich Swann (200 lb (91 kg))

The TNA World Heavyweight Championship was a short-lived professional wrestling world heavyweight championship created and promoted by Impact Wrestling. As part of a storyline in April 2020, Moose began to refer to himself as the TNA World Heavyweight Champion and carrying around the title belt that last represented the championship before it became known as the Impact World Championship. On February 23, 2021, Impact officially sanctioned Moose's TNA World Heavyweight Championship as a separate title from the Impact World Championship.

Impact Wrestling Executive Vice President Scott D'Amore claimed that the championship carried the lineage of the title formerly known as the TNA World Heavyweight Championship, but how much of that lineage was unclear. It would be a short-lived championship, as at Sacrifice on March 13, 2021, Impact World Champion Rich Swann defeated Moose in a championship unification match, deactivating the TNA World Heavyweight Championship. The Impact World Championship became briefly known as the Impact Unified World Championship, and was represented by both title belts, until reigning champion Christian Cage retired the TNA belt on the August 19, 2021, episode of Impact!, returning to a single belt.

== History ==
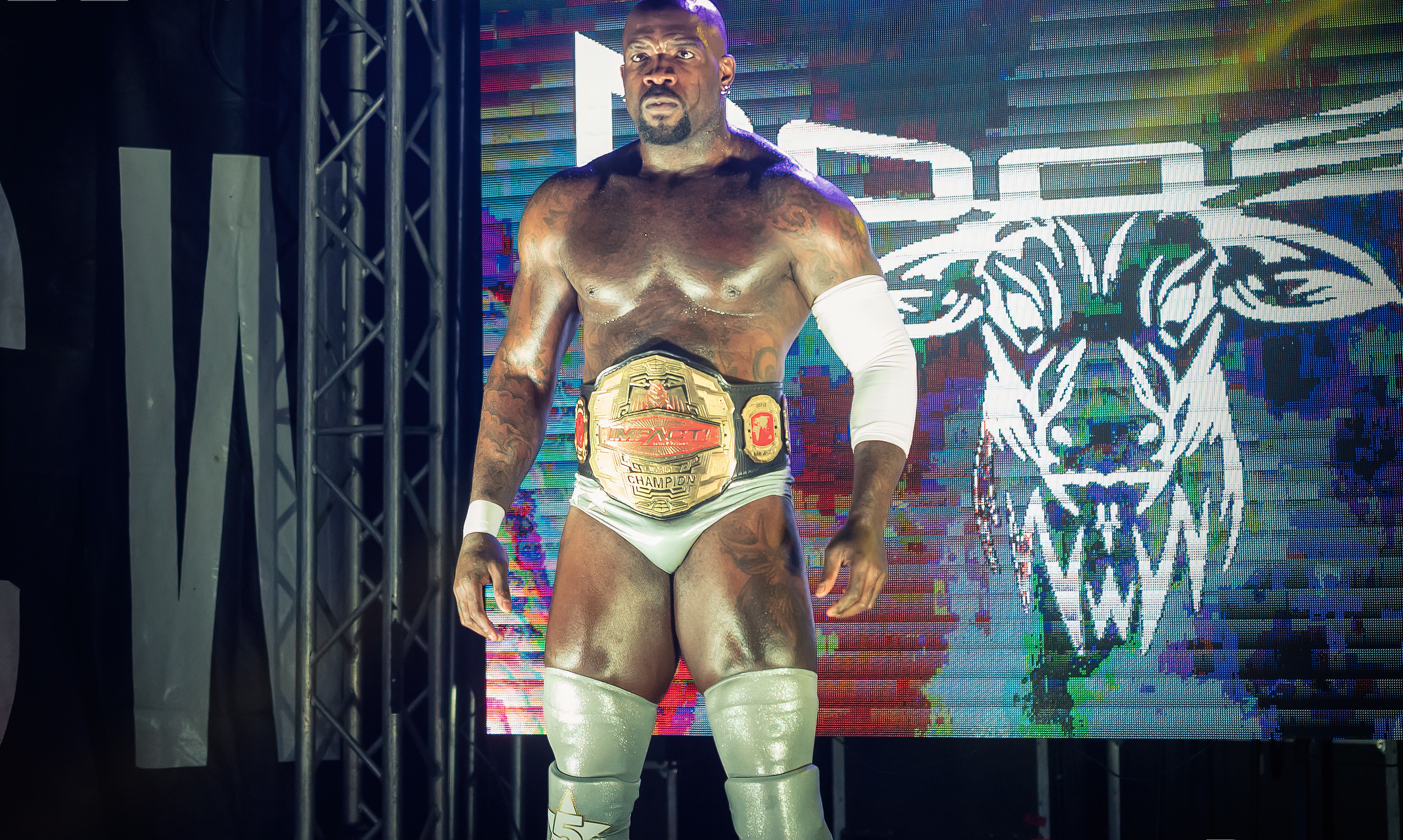
Inaugural champion Moose

Impact Wrestling was originally known as Total Nonstop Action Wrestling (TNA). The promotion was originally affiliated with the National Wrestling Alliance (NWA), and controlled the booking over the NWA World Heavyweight Championship. In 2007, the agreement between TNA and the NWA ended, leading to the creation of the TNA World Heavyweight Championship. TNA changed its name and became Impact Wrestling in March 2017, and the championship was renamed accordingly.

In early 2020, Impact started a storyline where Moose dubbed himself "Mr. TNA," claiming to represent the company's history while battling former stars. During the second part of Rebellion (taped April 8–10 and aired on April 28), Moose defeated Hernandez and Michael Elgin in a triple threat match which was originally scheduled to be for the Impact World Championship, but reigning champion Tessa Blanchard was absent due to the COVID-19 pandemic. Following the match, Moose brought back the championship belt that represented the TNA World Heavyweight Championship from 2011 to 2017 and declared himself the TNA World Heavyweight Champion. While Impact did not officially recognize Moose as champion, Moose defended his self-appointed title several times.

The following year on the February 23, 2021, episode of Impact!, the promotion's Executive Vice President Scott D'Amore announced that Moose's self-proclaimed championship was officially sanctioned as a separate title from the Impact World Championship with Moose immediately recognized as TNA World Heavyweight Champion. D'Amore stated that the championship also carried the lineage of the title formerly known as the TNA World Heavyweight Championship, though how much of that lineage was unclear. After this, D'Amore scheduled a championship unification match for Sacrifice on March 13, 2021, in which Impact World Champion Rich Swann would face TNA World Heavyweight Champion Moose to determine Impact's undisputed world champion. At the event, Swann defeated Moose to unify the titles. The TNA World Heavyweight Championship was deactivated, while the Impact World Championship became briefly known as the Impact Unified World Championship with Swann carrying both championship belts. Subsequent Impact World Champions Kenny Omega and Christian Cage also carried both title belts, until Cage formally retired the TNA belt on the August 19, 2021, episode of Impact!.

== Reigns ==
Key
No.	Overall reign number
Reign	Reign number for the specific champion
Days	Number of days held
Days recog.	Number of days held recognized by the promotion
+	Current reign is changing daily

No.	Champion	Championship change			Reign statistics			Notes	Ref.
No.	Champion	Date	Event	Location	Reign	Days	Days recog.	Notes	Ref.
†	Moose	April 8–10, 2020	Rebellion; Night 2	Nashville, TN	—	319–321	301	Moose unofficially declared himself the TNA World Heavyweight Champion after defeating Hernandez and Michael Elgin in a triple threat match, which was originally scheduled to be for the Impact World Championship, but reigning champion Tessa Blanchard missed the tapings due to the COVID-19 pandemic. This event aired on tape delay on April 28, 2020.	
1	Moose	February 23, 2021	Impact!	Nashville, TN	1	18	18	Impact Wrestling officially sanctioned Moose's TNA World Heavyweight Championship as a separate title from the Impact World Championship.	
2	Rich Swann	March 13, 2021	Sacrifice	Nashville, TN	1	<1	<1	This was a championship unification match in which Swann defended the Impact World Championship.	
—	Unified	March 13, 2021	Sacrifice	Nashville, TN	—	—	—	Rich Swann defeated Moose to unify the TNA World Heavyweight Championship with his Impact World Championship, which briefly became known as the Impact Unified World Championship.	

== See also ==
- List of former championships in Total Nonstop Action Wrestling
