= Skyway Studios =

Film and television studio in Nashville, Tennessee

General information
- Location: 3201 Dickerson Pike; Nashville, Tennessee; 91505
- Coordinates: 36°14′1.7448″N 86°45′23.7312″W
- Opening: 2015
- Owner: Julie Carell Stadler

Website
- Official website

Skyway Studios is a film and television production studio located in Nashville, Tennessee. Opening in 2015, the studio was once a former studio facility for the Christian Broadcasting Network.

== Notable productions ==
The studio has hosted tapings for the syndicated daytime talk show Pickler & Ben from 2017 to 2019.

The Grammy Award-winning hard rock band Halestorm would film music videos for their songs "Darkness Always Wins" and "The Steeple" at the studio.

From 2020 to 2021, Total Nonstop Action Wrestling (TNA) would hold several television tapings for Impact!, Xplosion, and later Before The Impact at the studio due to the COVID-19 pandemic. TNA would also hold several pay-per-view events beginning with the 2020 Slammiversary. Initially holding events behind closed doors, the promotion would gradually begin allowing fans to attend shows at the studio starting with the 2021 Slammiversary pay-per-view.

From March 21, 2022 to November 4, 2023, the National Wrestling Alliance would hold television tapings for its weekly shows Powerrr and NWA USA.

Due to the aftermath of Hurricane Helene, TNA rescheduled a set of tapings which were set to be at the Spartanburg Memorial Auditorium in Spartanburg, South Carolina to the Skyway Studios on October 2, 2024 and October 3, 2024.
