= TNA World Championship =

Men's professional wrestling world championship

- The current TNA World Championship belt (2024 - present)

Details
- Promotion: Total Nonstop Action Wrestling
- Date established: May 13, 2007
- Current champion: Leon Slater
- Date won: October 11, 2026

Other names
- TNA World Heavyweight Championship (2007–2017); Impact Wrestling World Heavyweight Championship (2017); Unified GFW World Heavyweight Championship (2017); GFW Global Championship (2017); Impact Global Championship (2017-2018); Impact World Championship (2018–2024); Impact Unified World Championship (2021); TNA World Championship (2024–present)
Statistics
- First champion: Kurt Angle
- Most reigns: Kurt Angle (6 reigns)
- Longest reign: Josh Alexander (2nd reign, 335 days)
- Shortest reign: Josh Alexander (1st reign, 3 minutes)
- Oldest champion: Sting (52 years, 113 days)
- Youngest champion: Leon Slater (22 years, 14 days)
- Heaviest champion: Moose (299 lb (136 kg))
- Lightest champion: Tessa Blanchard (125 lb (57 kg))

The TNA World Championship is a professional wrestling world championship created and promoted by Total Nonstop Action Wrestling (TNA). It is the promotion's principal championship. Like most professional wrestling championships, the title is won via pinfall or submission. The current champion is Leon Slater, who is in his first reign. He won the title by defeating Nic Nemeth in his Option C title opportunity at Bound for Glory on October 11, 2026.

Before the championship was created, TNA controlled the NWA World Heavyweight Championship via an agreement with the National Wrestling Alliance (NWA). In 2007, the agreement between TNA and the NWA ended, leading to the creation of the TNA World Heavyweight Championship. The championship was unveiled on May 14, 2007, at the taping of TNA's primary television program, Impact!, which aired on May 17, 2007. The inaugural champion was Kurt Angle, who also holds the record for the most reigns at six.

After TNA changed its name and became Impact Wrestling in March 2017, the title was renamed to reflect the change. After Impact Wrestling rebranded to Global Force Wrestling (GFW) later that year, the title was unified with the original GFW Global Championship at Slammiversary XV and became the Unified GFW World Heavyweight Championship. Following Destination X, the title took the GFW Global Championship name and kept the former TNA lineage. On October 23, 2017, the GFW name was dropped, and the company name reverted to Impact Wrestling when the company severed ties with Jeff Jarrett, and he took the GFW name with him. However, Impact Wrestling kept the Global Championship name for their championship and the title was then called the Impact Global Championship. On the February 1, 2018, episode of Impact!, the title became known as the Impact World Championship. On June 4, 2018, the title was unified with the Impact Grand Championship and on March 13, 2021, it was unified with the TNA World Heavyweight Championship, which was briefly sanctioned in 2021 as a separate title from the Impact World Championship. In January 2024, Impact Wrestling reverted to the TNA name, thus renaming the title as TNA World Championship.

== History ==
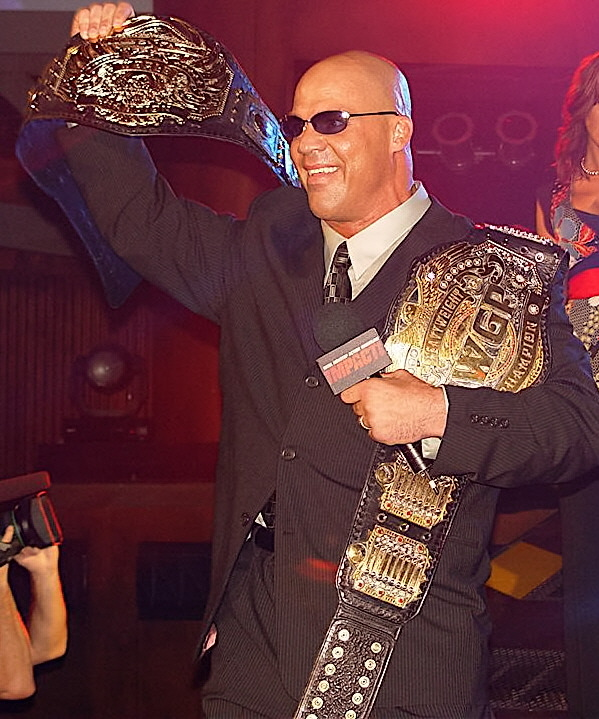
Inaugural champion Kurt Angle, pictured here with the TNA World Championship (right hand)

TNA Wrestling was formed as NWA: Total Nonstop Action in May 2002. Later that year, TNA was granted control over the NWA World Heavyweight and World Tag Team Championships by the National Wrestling Alliance (NWA) governing body; subsequently becoming an official NWA territory as NWA-TNA. On June 19, 2002, NWA-TNA held its first show; a weekly pay-per-view event. The main event of the telecast was a twenty-man Gauntlet for the Gold match in which 20 men sought to throw each other over the top rope and down to the floor in order to eliminate others, until there were two men left who wrestle a standard singles match to become the first TNA-era NWA World Heavyweight Champion. Ken Shamrock defeated Malice to win the vacant championship with Ricky Steamboat as the guest referee at the event.

=== Creation ===
The NWA World Heavyweight and World Tag Team Championships were contested for in TNA until May 13, 2007, when NWA ended their five-year agreement with TNA, which had allowed the latter full control over both titles. NWA Executive Director Robert Trobich also stripped then-NWA World Heavyweight Champion Christian Cage and then-NWA World Tag Team Champions Team 3D of their respective championships, ostensibly because Cage refused to defend the NWA World Heavyweight Championship against wrestlers from other NWA territories. That same day, TNA were scheduled to produce their Sacrifice event, in which both Cage and Team 3D were to defend their respective championships. On the card, Cage was scheduled to defend the NWA World Heavyweight Championship against Kurt Angle and Sting in a three-way match.

That night, the onscreen graphic used to refer to the champions and their respective championships credited both Cage and Team 3D as still being NWA champions. Angle defeated Cage and Sting to win the World Heavyweight Championship.

During subsequent TV tapings for the next two episodes of Impact!, TNA did not acknowledge the NWA ending their agreement with TNA but gave a storyline explanation as to why a new championship was created. Management Director Jim Cornette, TNA's on-screen authority figure at the time, decided that "due to TNA's growing worldwide exposure, the company needed to have its own TNA title belts". At the first episode, broadcast on tape delay on May 17 Angle introduced himself as the "new TNA World Heavyweight Champion". but later on, Cornette stripped Angle of the TNA championship due to the controversial finish of the match at Sacrifice. and scheduled a King of the Mountain match for the championship at TNA's Slammiversary on June 17, 2007. This match type involves five participants racing to gain a pinfall or submission to become eligible to hang a championship belt to win. On May 15, 2007, Jeremy Borash unveiled the TNA World Heavyweight Championship belt on that day's edition of TNA's online video podcast TNA Today.

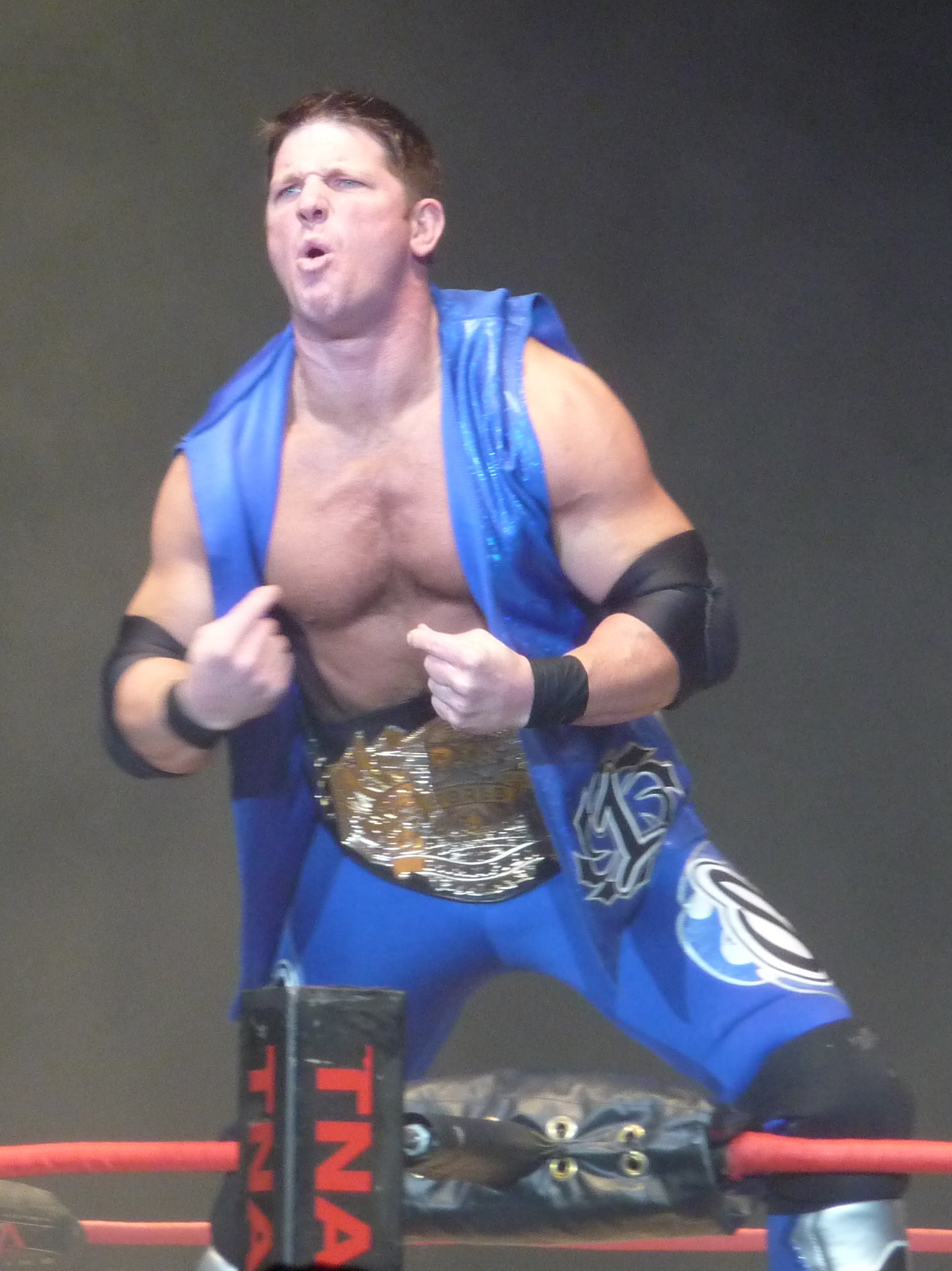
Two-time champion AJ Styles with the belt in 2010

The five participants for the King of the Mountain match were determined in a series of standard wrestling matches that took place on Impact! leading up to the event, with Angle defeating Rhino in the first bout to gain entry on the May 17 episode of Impact!. On the May 24 episode of Impact!, Samoa Joe defeated Sting to become the second participant. The third qualification match was held on the May 31 episode of Impact! between A.J. Styles and Tomko, which Styles won. The next bout pitted Chris Harris against James Storm on the June 7 episode Impact!, which ended in a double disqualification, therefore neither man advanced to the King of the Mountain match. The final qualification match was won by Christian Cage over Abyss on the June 14 episode of Impact!. Angle ended up winning the King of the Mountain match at Slammiversary over Joe, Cage, Styles and Harris, who was a mystery participant chosen by Cornette, to become the "undisputed TNA World Heavyweight Champion".

=== Re-branding ===
In early 2017 After TNA rebranded as Impact Wrestling, the name of its flagship show, the TNA World Heavyweight Championship changed its name to the Impact Wrestling World Heavyweight Championship to reflect the name changes of the company.

At Slammiversary XV, GFW Global Champion Alberto El Patron defeated Impact Wrestling World Heavyweight Champion Bobby Lashley to unify the titles, with the GFW Global Championship being dropped and the Impact World Heavyweight Championship changing its name to the Unified GFW World Championship as Impact Wrestling began rebranding once again as GFW. In September 2017, GFW reverted their branding to Impact Wrestling, the championship then became known as the Impact Global Championship.

On the February 1, 2018, episode of Impact!, the title became known as the Impact World Championship. On June 4, 2018, the title was unified with the Impact Grand Championship, with the latter title being officially retired.

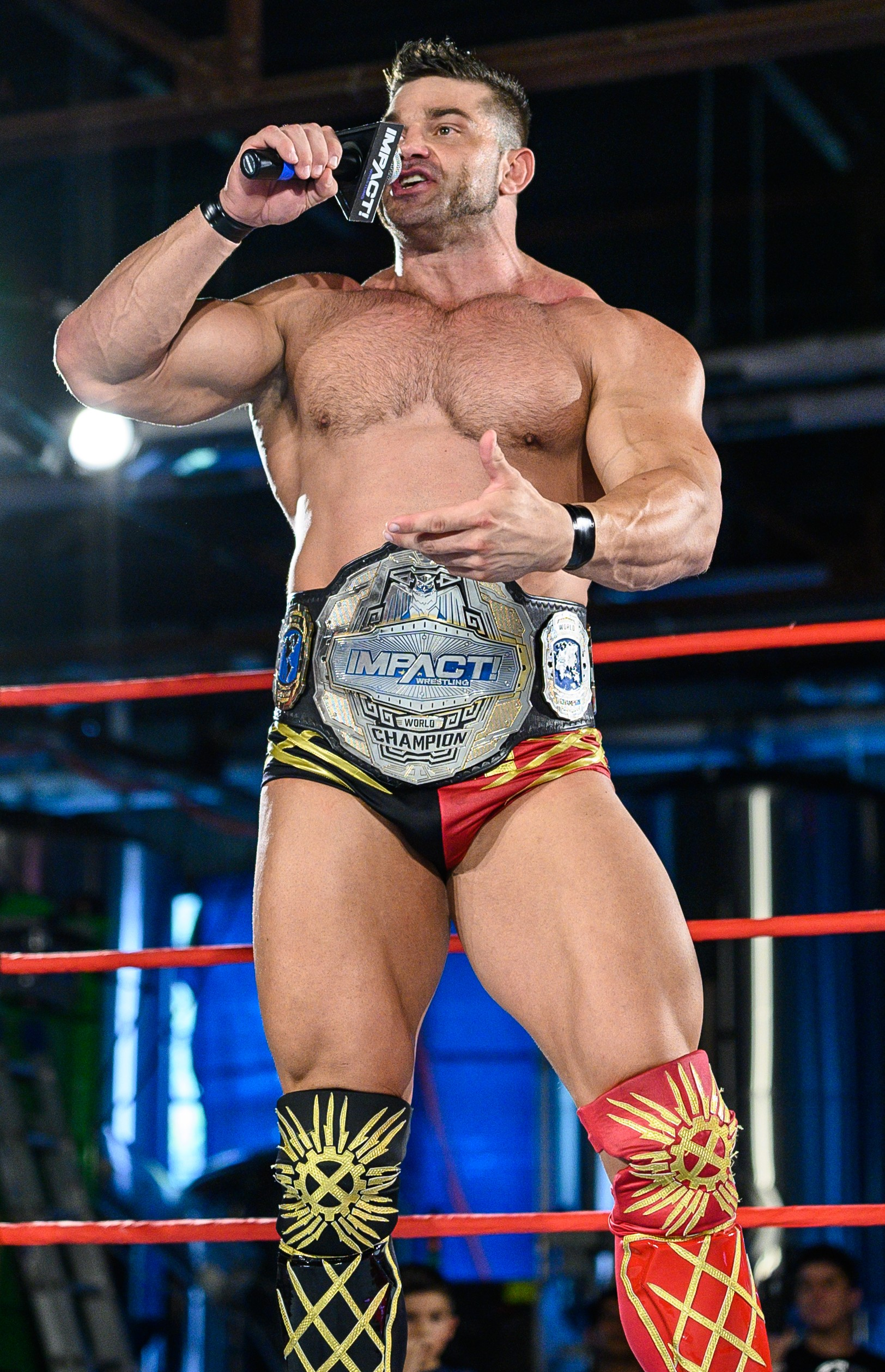
Brian Cage with the Impact World Championship in 2019.

At Rebellion, Moose appeared with the old TNA World Heavyweight Championship belt (its 3rd design from 2011 to 2017, later modified with a white strap) and declared himself the new TNA World Heavyweight Champion after defeating Hernandez and Michael Elgin in a triple threat match, which was originally to be for the Impact World Championship but reigning champion Tessa Blanchard missed the tapings due to the COVID-19 pandemic. While the title was not recognized as an official championship by Impact, Moose had several title defenses. On the February 23, 2021, episode of Impact!, Executive Vice President Scott D’Amore officially sanctioned Moose's self-proclaimed championship. At Sacrifice, Impact World Champion Rich Swann defeated Moose to unify the championships. The TNA title was deactivated, and the Impact World Championship was briefly referred to as the Impact Unified World Championship.

=== Return to TNA name ===
As Impact Wrestling returned to its original name, TNA Wrestling, the world title also reverted back to its original name. It has been known as the TNA World Championship ever since.

== Championship tournaments ==
=== TNA World Heavyweight Championship Tournament (2010) ===
On the August 19, 2010, edition of TNA Impact!, the TNA World Heavyweight Championship was vacated, after champion Rob Van Dam suffered a storyline injury. The title was put up in a tournament featuring the top eight ranked wrestlers in the TNA Championship Committee rankings. The finals of the tournament would take place at Bound for Glory on October 10, where Jeff Hardy was victorious and crowned the new champion.

=== TNA World Heavyweight Championship Tournament (2013) ===
On October 29, 2013, TNA President Dixie Carter vacated the TNA World Heavyweight Championship after the previous champion A.J. Styles. Carter scheduled an eight-man tournament to determine a new champion, that would begin on November 7. Seven of the eight men were former TNA World Heavyweight Champions including Jeff Hardy, Chris Sabin, Bobby Roode, James Storm, Kurt Angle, Austin Aries, and Samoa Joe. The eighth would be determined later in the night in a gauntlet match, which was eventually won by Magnus last eliminating Kazarian and Sting. Match stipulations for the tournament were determined by spinning the "Wheel of Dixie"; options included a Falls Count Anywhere match, a Bull Rope match, a Submission match, a Ladder match, a Full Metal Mayhem match, a Coalminer's Glove match, a Tables match, a Dixieland match, a Tuxedo match, and Last Man Standing match. The Storm/Roode match was originally a Bull Rope match but Storm asked Carter to change it to a Florida Death match, which was not on the "Wheel of Dixie", which Carter agreed to. Also, the winner would be decided at TNA Final Resolution of 2013.

== Championship belt designs ==
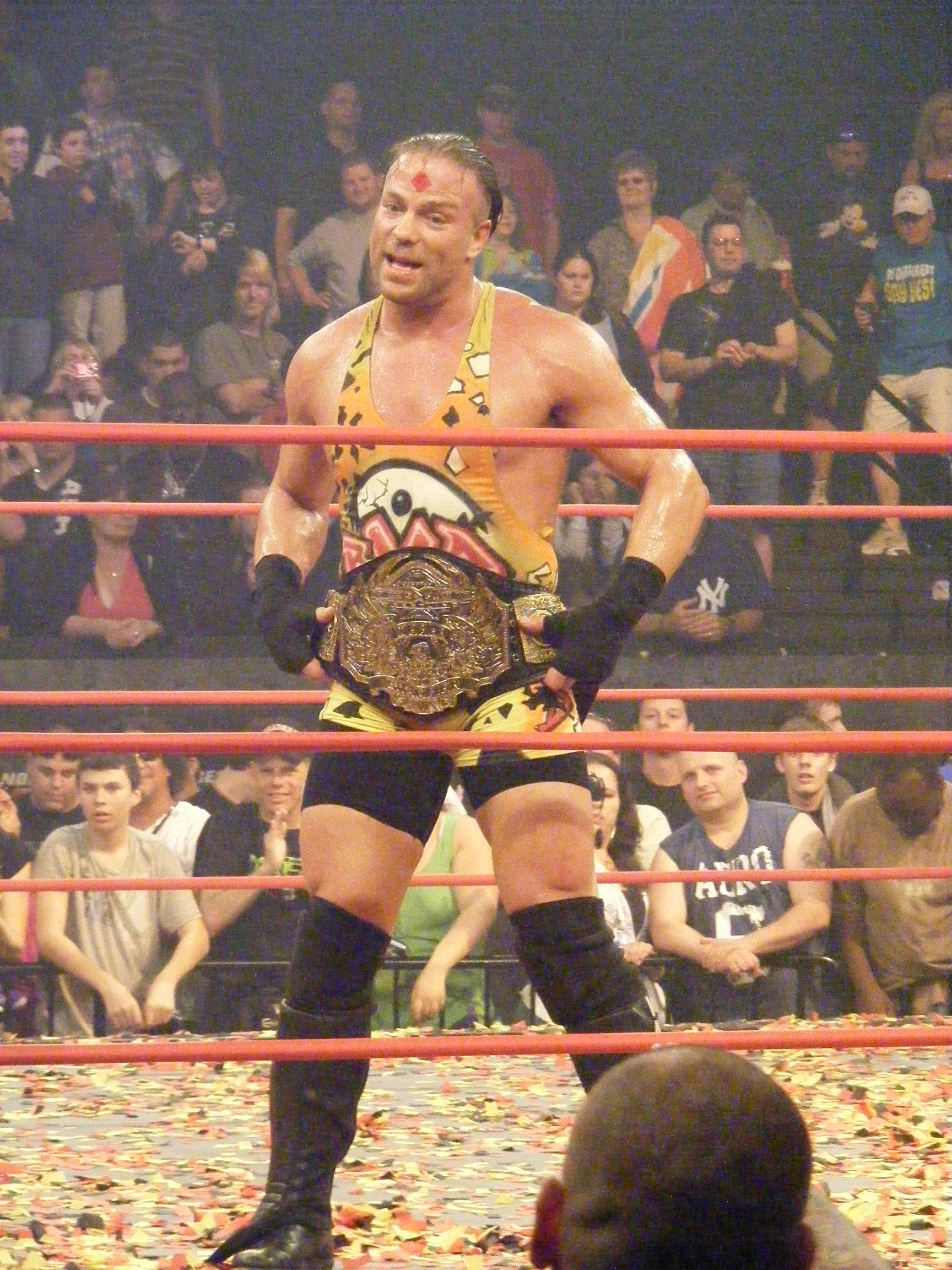
Rob Van Dam with the original TNA World Heavyweight Championship belt

The championship has had seven belt designs, with the original title belt (which was unveiled in May 2007) having on its center plate an imprint of an eagle with its wings extended. The word "World" was placed above the eagle's head on a ribbon. The ribbon was wrapped around the bird's wings and body. Five stars were engraved on the ribbon when it passed over each of the bird's wings and the word "Champion" as it passed over the bird's talons. The words "Heavyweight Wrestling" were printed across the bird's chest. At the top of the center plate there was TNA logo. Four smaller side plates had an imprint of a globe centered with TNA's logo at the top and bottom of each. At each end of the title belt there was a small plate that covered the championship belt snaps with TNA's logo engraved on each.

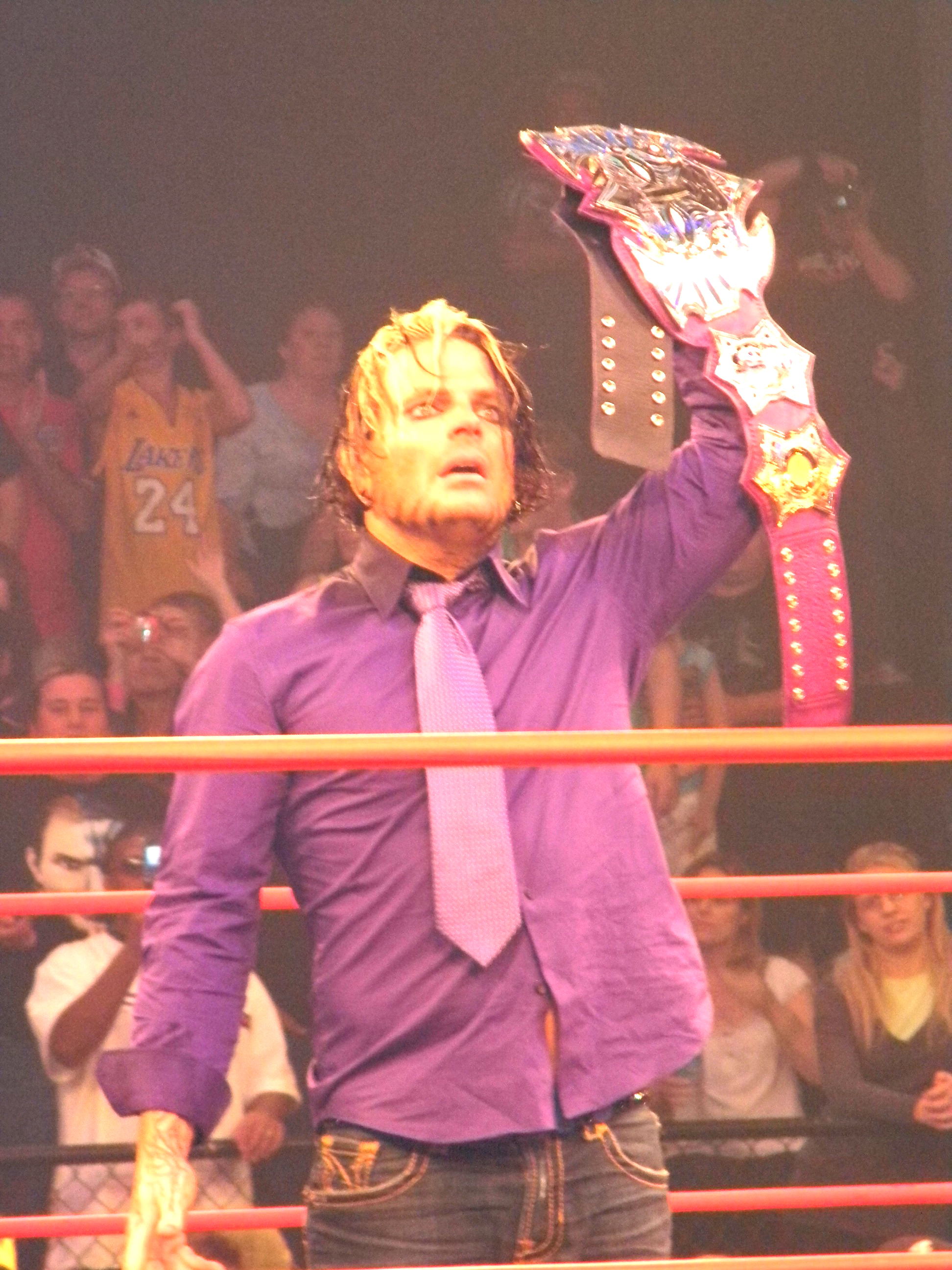
Jeff Hardy with his custom "Immortal Championship", which would later become the official second title belt design after being used by other champions

At the November 8, 2010, tapings of the November 11 episode of Impact!, TNA introduced a new design for the TNA World Heavyweight Championship belt, which the champion Jeff Hardy dubbed the "Immortal Championship", as part of the Immortal storyline. The new design consisted of a purple strap with a silver center plate depicting a masked head (designed to resemble Hardy's face with face paint), the TNA logo on the forehead and blue lines along the mask. There were four irregular dodecagonal side plates on the title belt, shaped like stars with rounded edges on two of the sides of these plates.

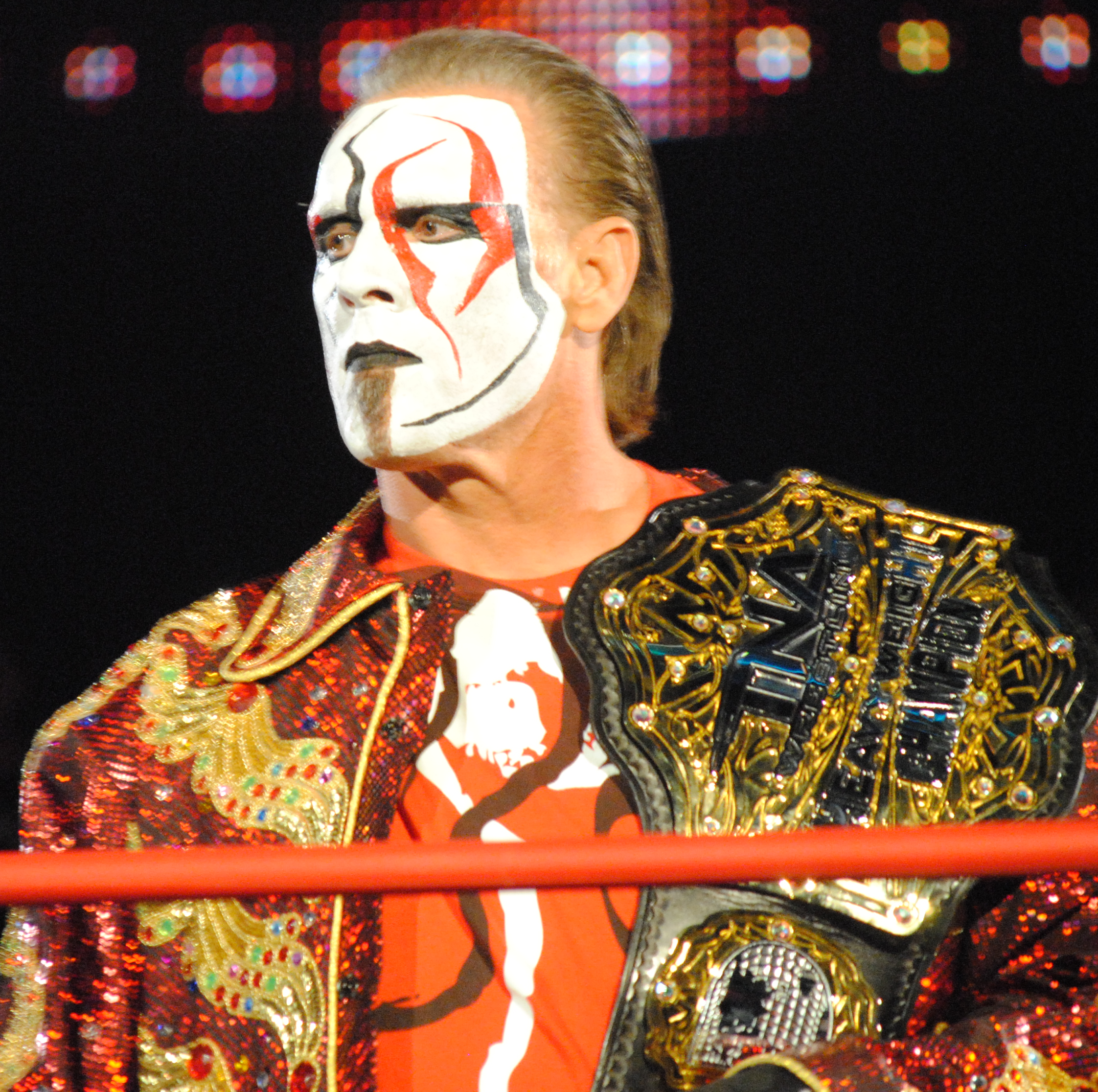
Sting with the third title belt design (2011–2017)

The Immortal title belt was replaced by the third design of the championship belt at the March 14, 2011 tapings of the March 17 episode of Impact!, introduced by the reigning champion at the time, Sting. The design featured seven gold plates over a black leather strap. The center plate had faux diamonds aligned along its multiple rounded edges, similar to that of the Big Gold Belt. Over the center plate was a large TNA Wrestling logo and below it the words "Heavyweight Champion" engraved in silver. On each side of the center plate was a group of three smaller plates, one with a TNA logo engraved while the other two featured separate corresponding halves of a globe, on either side of the TNA logo side plate. This belt—modified with a white strap—returned in April 2020 after Moose declared himself as "TNA World Heavyweight Champion" following defeating several past TNA wrestlers, and with then-reigning Impact World Champion Tessa Blanchard being absent due to COVID-19 pandemic travel restrictions. Moose's title would remain unrecognized until February 2021, when it became officially sanctioned and recognized by Impact executive vice president Scott D'Amore.

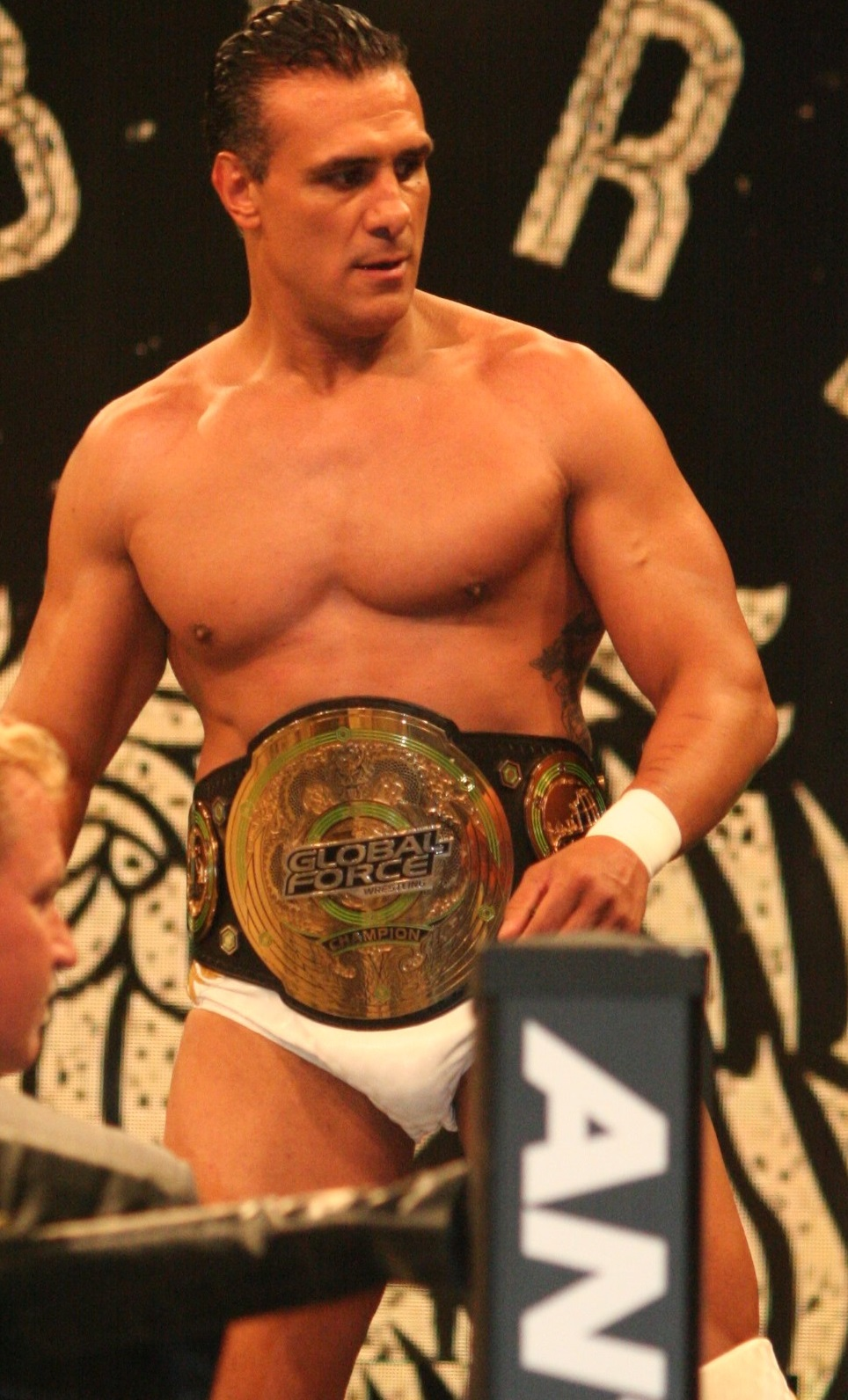
Alberto El Patrón with the fourth design after the company was renamed "Global Force Wrestling"

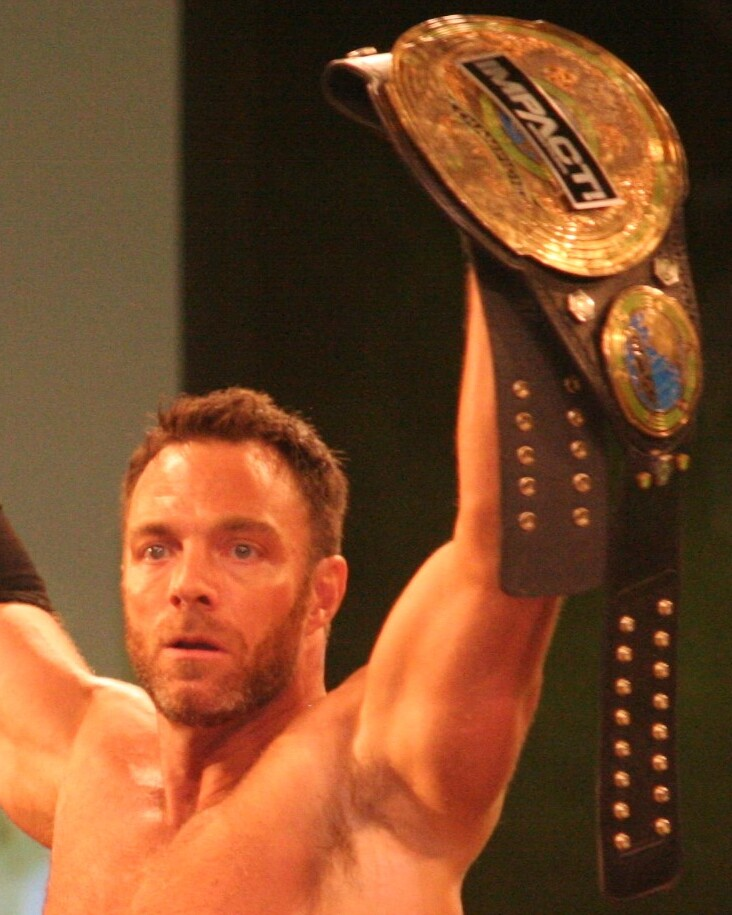
Eli Drake with a modified version of the fourth design, which had an "Impact Wrestling" plate to cover the Global Force Wrestling logo

Following Slammiversary XV, both the TNA and original GFW Global Championship belts were used in tandem to represent the unification of both titles. At Destination X 2017, the GFW Global Championship belt, with an updated color scheme and Impact logos on the side plates, became the sole belt used. Following the departure of Jeff Jarrett from the promotion, the company reverted to the Impact Wrestling name and the title belt was updated with an Impact name plate to reflect the change.

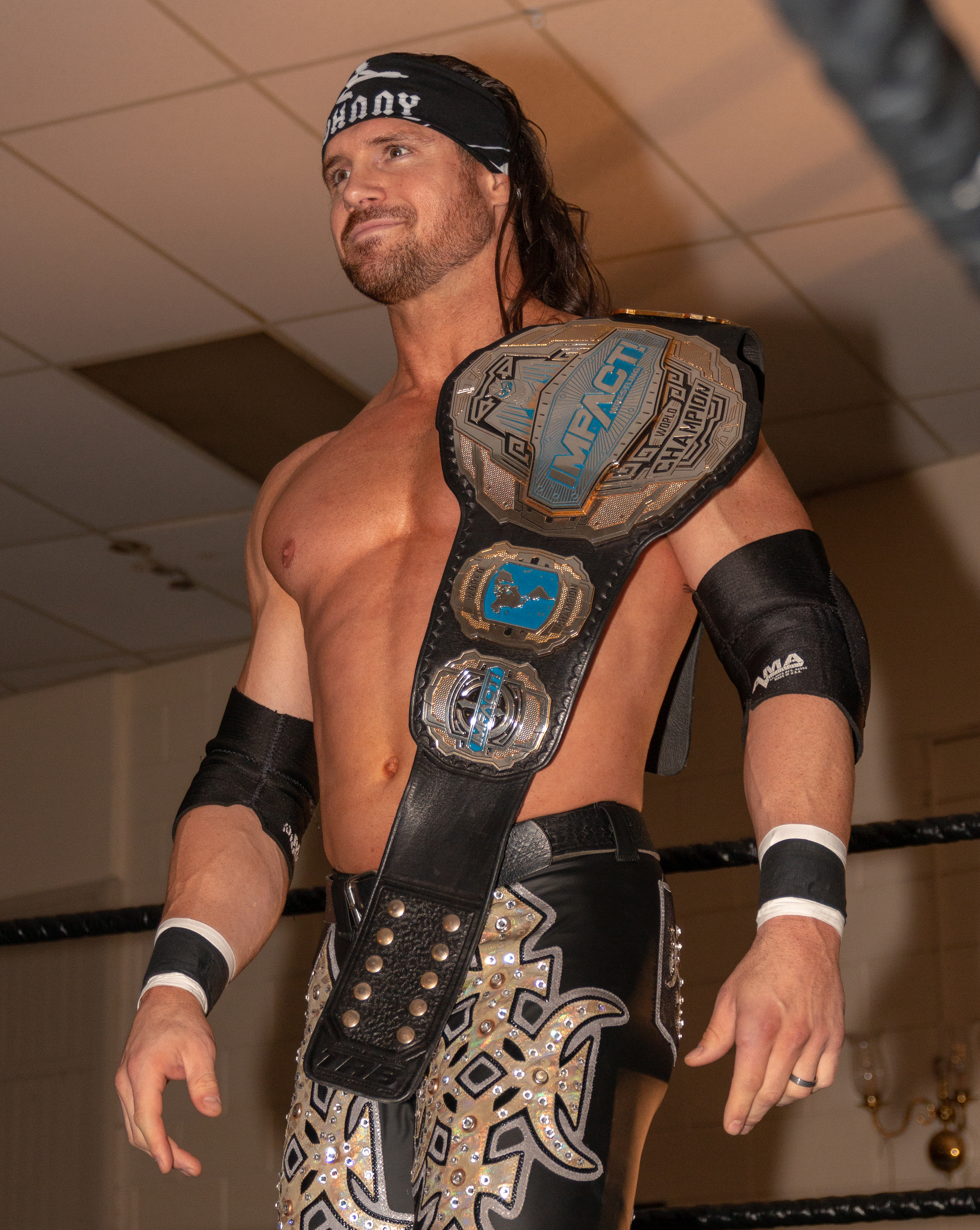
Johnny Impact with the fifth design, in its original blue version, introduced in 2018

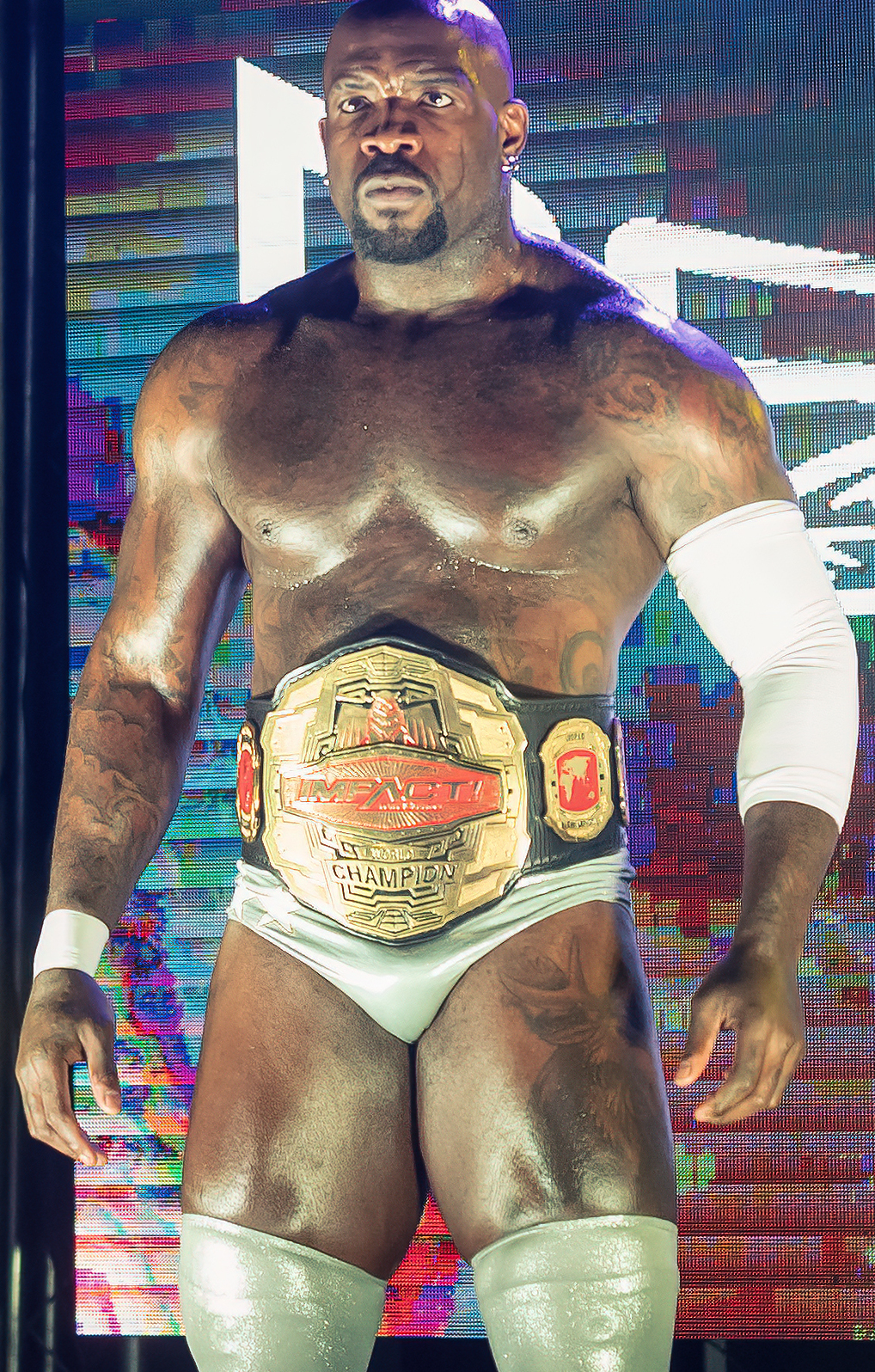
Moose with the red version of the fifth design, introduced in 2020.

A new title design was introduced at Impact Wrestling's Redemption on April 22, 2018. The gold center plate has the Impact logo with "World Champion" inscribed below the logo. An owl sits above the Impact logo, representing Impact's parent company Anthem Sports & Entertainment. On each side of the center plate is a group of four smaller gold plates, with the inner side plates featuring separate corresponding halves of a globe with "World" inscribed above the globes and "Champion" inscribed below them and the outer side plates featuring the Impact logo but without the owl design. Blue shading had filled the Impact logo, the owl design, and the globes and logos on the side plates, but in 2020, the belt was modified with red shading replacing the previous blue to reflect the new color of the Impact Wrestling logo introduced following the move to AXS TV.

At Sacrifice on March 13, 2021, Impact World Champion Rich Swann defeated TNA World Heavyweight Champion Moose to unify the two championships. Following this, the 2020 red shaded Impact belt and the white strapped TNA belt were used jointly to represent the unified world championship; the unified title was briefly referred to as the Impact Unified World Championship before reverting to being called the Impact World Championship, though still represented by both belts (with the white strap TNA belt being swapped out for the original black strap version shortly thereafter). In August 2021, after Christian Cage won the title, the TNA belt was retired once again.

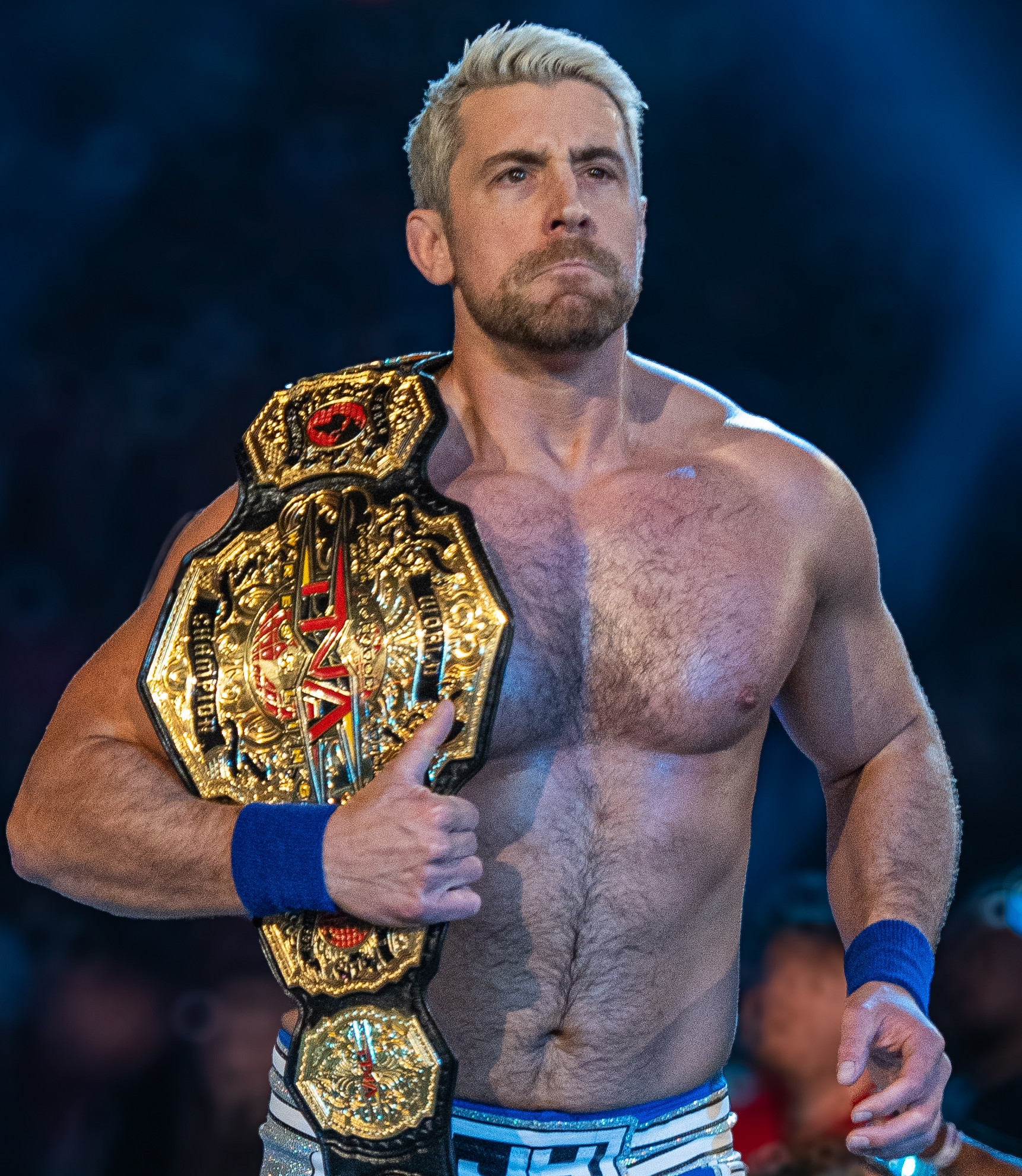
Joe Hendry with the current design, after the promotion reverted to TNA

Prior to Hard to Kill in January 2024, the company reverted back to the TNA name. To reflect the change, TNA President Scott D’Amore presented Alex Shelley, who was the last champion under the Impact name with a new belt. The new belt has five gold plates. The center plate added more height with the top and bottom each pointed like a V-shape with the sides having various shapes. In the center plate, features World on top, the TNA logo over a gold and red globe in center and Champion at the bottom. The first side plate next to the center on each side features World Champion in smaller print and globe in the center. The second side plate on each side is gold with TNA logo in the center. The third side plate on the right side features the Anthem logo in gold and red.

== Reigns ==
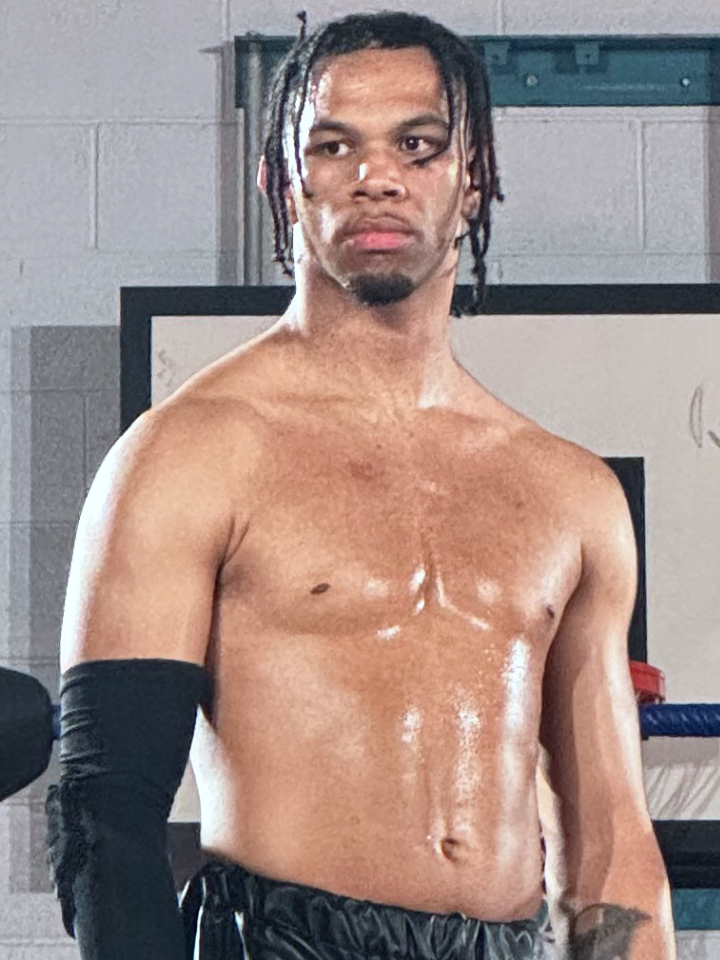
Current champion Leon Slater

Overall, there have been 67 reigns among 40 wrestlers and 7 vacancies. The inaugural champion was Kurt Angle, who won the title by defeating former NWA Champion Christian Cage and Sting in a three-way match at Sacrifice on May 13, 2007; The National Wrestling Alliance (NWA) stripped Cage of the title earlier that day, and due to the National Wrestling Alliance's agreement with TNA ending later that night, Angle was crowned the inaugural TNA World Heavyweight Champion. Angle also holds the record for the most reigns at six. Josh Alexander holds both the longest and shortest reigns with his second reign being the longest at 335 days and his first reign being the shortest at three minutes. Sting is the oldest champion at 52 years and 113 days, while Leon Slater is the youngest champion at 22 years and 14 days. Tessa Blanchard is the only woman to win the championship.

Leon Slater is the current champion in his first reign. He won the title by defeating Nic Nemeth in his Option C title opportunity at Bound for Glory on October 11, 2026, in Tampa, Florida.

== See also ==
- List of NWA World Heavyweight Champions

Sporting positions
Preceded by NWA World Heavyweight Championship	TNA Wrestling's top heavyweight championship 2007–present	Succeeded by Current
