= Victory Road (2022) =

2022 Impact Wrestling event

- Promotional poster featuring Sami Callihan, Steve Maclin, and Moose
- Promotion: Impact Wrestling
- Date: September 23, 2022
- City: Nashville, Tennessee
- Venue: Skyway Studios

Impact Plus Monthly Specials chronology
← Previous; Emergence	Next → Over Drive

Victory Road chronology
← Previous; 2021	Next → 2023

The 2022 Victory Road was a professional wrestling event produced by Impact Wrestling. It took place on September 23, 2022, at Skyway Studios in Nashville, Tennessee, and aired on Impact Plus and YouTube. It was the 13th event under the Victory Road chronology. The event also featured wrestlers from partner promotions Lucha Libre AAA Worldwide (AAA) and New Japan Pro-Wrestling (NJPW).

Ten matches were contested at the event, including two on the pre-show and one taped as a digital exclusive. In the main event, Steve Maclin defeated Moose and Sami Callihan in a three-way Barbed Wire Massacre. In other prominent matches, Jordynne Grace defeated Max the Impaler, Frankie Kazarian won an Intergender X Division Triple Threat Revolver to become the number one contender to the Impact X Division Championship at Bound for Glory, Mickie James defeated Gisele Shaw in a Career Threatening match, and Mike Bailey defeated Delirious to retain the X Division Championship in the opening bout. The event also marked the Impact debut of Bobby Fish.

== Production ==
=== Background ===
Victory Road was an annual professional wrestling event produced by Impact Wrestling (then known as Total Nonstop Action Wrestling) between 2004 and 2012. In 2013, TNA discontinued most of its monthly pay-per-view events in favor of the new pre-recorded One Night Only events. Victory Road would be revived as a "One Night Only" event in 2014, a special edition of Impact's weekly television series in 2017, and has been a monthly special for Impact Plus since the 2019 event.

On August 5, 2022, Impact Wrestling announced that they will return to Skyway Studios in Nashville, Tennessee, for Victory Road on September 23, 2022.

=== Storylines ===
The event featured several professional wrestling matches that involved different wrestlers from pre-existing scripted feuds and storylines. Wrestlers portrayed villains, heroes, or less distinguishable characters in scripted events that build tension and culminate in a wrestling match or series of matches.

At Slammiversary, Sami Callihan defeated Moose in a Monster's Ball match, his first match back from an ankle injury caused by Moose. Several weeks later, at Against All Odds, Moose won the rematch, this time a Clockwork Orange House of Fun match against Callihan due to interference from Steve Maclin. While there was no obvious explanation for Moose and Maclin's suggested alliance, they would help each other in attacking Callihan whenever the latter attempted an ambush in the following weeks. Callihan would eventually defeat Maclin at Emergence in a no disqualification match, after their first match earlier in the night ended in a no contest. All three would be a part of an Impact World Championship number one contender six-way elimination match on the August 18 episode of Impact!. Moose and Maclin would team up to eliminate Callihan, with Maclin immediately using a rollup to eliminate Moose, leading to them bickering. On the August 25 episode of Impact!, Callihan got into a backstage fight with Moose and Maclin when they were arguing, resulting in Callihan getting left bloodied and wrapped up in barbed wire in the parking lot. When Callihan emerged at ringside, he challenged Moose and Maclin to a three-way Barbed Wire Massacre at Victory Road. The next week's episode would have a segment where Maclin and Moose were shown arguing about the contender's match and the need to focus their attention on Callihan. On the September 8 episode of Impact!, Maclin would have an interview with Gia Miller where he denied an alliance with Moose, but saying it is in their best interest to work together. He would then be surprised by Miller to find out he has a tag match against Decay next week. Later in the episode, Callihan would have a promo where he promised to turn Maclin and Moose against each other and destroy them. Moose and Maclin would be defeated by Black Taurus and Crazzy Steve on the September 15 episode of Impact! due to their bickering. After the match, Callihan would appear in the balcony and would show security footage of both men having conversations where they planned to betray each other. They would start brawling with Callihan joining the brawl and hitting Maclin with a barbed wire wrapped bat. A week later, Scott D'Amore would have all three be a part of a Hold Harmless contract signing, to free Impact from any liability from their upcoming match. After numerous threats to each other, the signing would break down into violence with Maclin and Moose working together to bust Callihan open. Moose would then betray Maclin by attacking him until Callihan in turn took Moose out. Callihan would then sign the contract using his own blood.

After defending the Impact Knockouts World Championship at Emergence against Mia Yim, Jordynne Grace would be confronted by the undefeated Masha Slamovich, who would deliver a "death warrant" (a picture of Grace crossed out in Slamovich's blood) to her. The next episode of Impact! would have an interview with Grace about the situation. VXT (Deonna Purrazzo and Chelsea Green) would interrupt making trouble until Yim backed up Grace, leading to a match the next week. That match happened on the August 25 episode of Impact!, where VXT defeated Grace and Yim with Purrazzo pinning Grace. Later in the episode, VXT would approach Gail Kim wanting a Knockouts title shot. To resolve the issue, she would make a contender match next week between Purrazzo and Slamovich. The main event of the September 1 episode of Impact! would have Slamovich defeating Purrazzo to earn a title match at Bound for Glory. After the match, Grace would come to the ring and present Slamovich with her own "death warrant". On the September 8 episode of Impact!, Grace would have an interview where it was revealed that she had a Slamovich chosen Pick Your Poison match at Victory Road. Grace would then find that her dressing room was covered in "death warrants". Grace would be in her still defaced dressing room the next week when Johnny Swinger and Zicky Dice delivered the message that Max the Impaler was her opponent at Victory Road. Dice would then offend Grace by claiming Slamovich would be the new champion, leading to Grace challenging him to a match. That match would happen on the September 22 episode of Impact, where Grace would easily defeat Dice (with Swinger). Later in the episode, a video narrated by Father James Mitchell would air hyping Max the Impaler.

Starting with the August 4 episode of Impact!, Eddie Edwards would try to convince Impact World Champion Josh Alexander to join Honor No More; telling Alexander that the company will take advantage of him though Alexander would not be interested. After defending his title at Emergence, Alexander would be recruited by Vincent to join HNM on the August 18 episode of Impact! with no success. In the main event of this episode, Edwards would win an Impact World Championship number one contender six-way elimination match, last eliminating Alexander's friend Rich Swann to earn a title match at Bound for Glory. A week later, Vincent would try to recruit Alexander again in the locker room. An annoyed Alexander would instead challenge and defeat Vincent in a match. After the match, Edwards would come out to the ring to recruit and threaten Alexander to join HNM. Edwards would be foiled by an attack from Heath, who was looking to continue his revenge on HNM after they injured his tag team partner Rhino. On the September 1 episode of Impact!, Edwards would interrupt an Alexander backstage interview. Before he could issue an ultimatum, Heath would attack Edwards leading to a match. That match would take place on the September 8 episode of Impact!, with Edwards defeating Heath after interference from Mike Bennett. After the match, Edwards would call out Alexander to extend his final offer to him. Alexander would decline the offer, leading to him being attacked by Honor No More's Edwards, Bennett, Matt Taven and Kenny King. Heath and Swann would try to intervene, but were swiftly handled by HNM. Because of the attack, Alexander would get a chance for revenge a week later with an Impact World Tag Team Championship match against The Kingdom and would choose Swann over Heath to be his partner. The Kingdom would win that match by disqualification after Heath was caught interfering by the ref while trying to counter interference from Edwards. Later in the episode, Heath would apologize backstage to Alexander and Swann. Scott D'Amore would advise them to get on the same page cause he made a six-man tag team match for Victory Road for them against Edwards and The Kingdom. On the September 22 episode of Impact!, Heath would attempt to make good for his actions by issuing an open challenge to HNM for a street fight. Despite HNM objections, PCO would accept. Heath would defeat PCO after Alexander and Swann prevented HNM from interfering, showing that they are on the same page.

After successfully defending the Impact X Division Championship at Emergence, Mike Bailey would continue his run as champion by defeating Chris Bey on the August 18 episode of Impact!. On the September 8 episode of Impact!, Kenny King would initially pin Bailey for the title, until another referee restarted the match due to Maria Kanellis interfering. Bailey would win the restarted match. After Mike Bailey successfully defended his title against Mascara Dorada on the September 15 episode of Impact!, Impact Executive Vice President Scott D'Amore came to Bailey backstage and said he would defend his title at Victory Road against Ring of Honor (ROH) veteran Delirious. Additionally, D'Amore announced the return of the Triple Threat Revolver, where the winner will receive a match for the X Division Championship at Bound for Glory. The match will feature competitors from Impact (Trey Miguel, Kenny King, and Mia Yim), Lucha Libre AAA Worldwide (Black Taurus and Laredo Kid), New Japan Pro-Wrestling (Alex Zayne and Yuya Uemura), and All Elite Wrestling (Impact veteran Frankie Kazarian). On the September 22 episode of Impact!, Black Taurus would defeat Zayne, Yim, Miguel and Laredo Kid in a preview match.

Mickie James would suffer setbacks at Against All Odds and the July 14 episode of Impact! in trying to get retribution against her former friend Chelsea Green. After suffering the loss on Impact!, an emotional James would be shown leaving the building unsure of her future. On the September 1 episode of Impact!, after some time for reflection, Mickie James returned and announced her "Last Rodeo", a final campaign to challenge herself towards an Impact Knockouts World Championship match where, if she lost her next match, she would retire from in-ring competition. James would go on to defeat independent talent, like Raychell Rose and Hyan, before being confronted by Gisele Shaw after the match with the latter. There, Shaw challenged James to a match at Victory Road, which James accepted. On the September 22 episode of Before the Impact, Shaw would defeat Hyan with James on commentary for the match. After the match, Shaw and James would get into a verbal confrontation.

At Emergence, The Kingdom (Matt Taven and Mike Bennett with Maria Kanellis-Bennett) won a Impact World Tag Team Championship match against The Good Brothers (Doc Gallows and Karl Anderson). An injury to Gallows would delay the match until the September 1 episode of Impact! where The Kingdom would win titles from The Good Brothers. Two weeks later, there would a first time ever matchup between The Good Brothers and The Motor City Machine Guns (Alex Shelley and Chris Sabin). The Machine Guns would defeat the Good Brothers to earn a title contender match against Aussie Open (Kyle Fletcher and Mark Davis) who had defeated Bullet Club (Ace Austin and Chris Bey) on the September 8 episode of Impact!. On the September 22 episode of Impact!, The Machine Guns would defeat Aussie Open to earn a tag title match at Bound for Glory. Later in the episode, it was announced that the Machine Guns would face PCO and Vincent at Victory Road in an attempt by Honor No More to weaken the Machine Guns before Bound For Glory.

On the July 28 episode of Impact!, after weeks of preview videos, Killer Kelly made her debut as a full-time member of Impact Wrestling, attacking two local talents after their match. Tasha Steelz (with Savannah Evans) would be on commentary for that match. Two weeks later, Kelly would defeat Tiffany Nieves in her debut match. Kelly would then begin to target Steelz after getting into a verbal confrontation with her after defeating her bodyguard Savannah Evans on the August 18 episode of Impact! A week later after checking on Evans in the medical room, Steelz would be locked in the Killer Clutch by Kelly briefly to scare her. The following week, a video would air of Kelly taunting and threatening Steelz. On the September 15 episode of Impact!, Kelly defeated Alisha Edwards, with Steelz on commentary at the behest of Kelly from the previous week. After the match, Steelz and Evans tried to attack Kelly with a steel chair before being stopped, to where Kelly mouthed "see you at Victory Road" to Steelz. A match between the two would officially be made for the event. A week later, Gia Miller would encounter Steelz and Evans stalking the backstage area with a steel chair looking for Kelly. While Steelz was distracted, Kelly would take out Evans before telling Steelz "you'll have to wait till Victory Road to play."

== Results ==
No.	Results	Stipulations	Times
1^{D}	Taya Valkyrie (with Jessicka and Rosemary) defeated Alisha Edwards by pinfall (Note: The match was taped for an Impact Digital Exclusive that aired on September 27.)	Singles match	5:55
2^{P}	Bullet Club (Ace Austin, Chris Bey, and Juice Robinson) defeated Jack Price, Jason Hotch, and Shogun by pinfall	Six-man tag team match	4:43
3^{P}	Tasha Steelz (with Savannah Evans) defeated Killer Kelly by disqualification	Singles match	9:21
4	Mike Bailey (c) defeated Delirious by pinfall	Singles match for the Impact X Division Championship	10:39
5	The Motor City Machine Guns (Alex Shelley and Chris Sabin) defeated Honor No More (PCO and Vincent) by pinfall	Tag team match	11:29
6	Mickie James defeated Gisele Shaw by pinfall	Career Threatening match Had Mickie James lost, she would have been forced to retire from in-ring competition.	12:21
7	Frankie Kazarian defeated Alex Zayne, Black Taurus, Kenny King, Laredo Kid, Mia Yim, Trey Miguel, and Yuya Uemura	Intergender X Division Triple Threat Revolver to determine the #1 contender to the Impact X Division Championship at Bound for Glory	24:08
8	Honor No More (Eddie Edwards, Matt Taven, and Mike Bennett) (with Maria Kanellis-Bennett) defeated Heath, Josh Alexander, and Rich Swann by pinfall	Six-man tag team match	16:06
9	Jordynne Grace defeated Max the Impaler (with Father James Mitchell) by pinfall	Pick Your Poison match Masha Slamovich handpicked Jordynne Grace's opponent.	10:35
10	Steve Maclin defeated Moose and Sami Callihan by pinfall	Three-way Barbed Wire Massacre	24:56
(c) / – the champion(s) heading into the match; D / – this was a dark match; P / – the match was broadcast on the pre-show
