= Victory Road (2023) =

2023 Impact Wrestling event

- Promotion: Impact Wrestling
- Date: September 8, 2023
- City: White Plains, New York
- Venue: Westchester County Center

Impact Plus Monthly Specials chronology
← Previous; Emergence	Next → Turning Point

Victory Road chronology
← Previous; 2022	Next → 2024

The 2023 Victory Road was the 17th Victory Road professional wrestling event produced by Impact Wrestling. It took place on September 8, 2023, at the Westchester County Center in White Plains, New York, and aired on Impact Plus and YouTube.

Twelve matches were contested at the event, including two on the pre-show and one taped as a digital exclusive. In the main event, Josh Alexander defeated Steve Maclin. In other prominent matches, Trinity defeated Alisha Edwards to retain the Impact Knockouts World Championship, and The Rascalz (Trey Miguel and Zachary Wentz) defeated The Motor City Machine Guns (Alex Shelley and Chris Sabin) to retain the Impact World Tag Team Championship. Also at this event, it was announced that Mike Tenay and the late Don West would be inducted into the Impact Hall of Fame at Bound for Glory.

== Production ==
=== Background ===
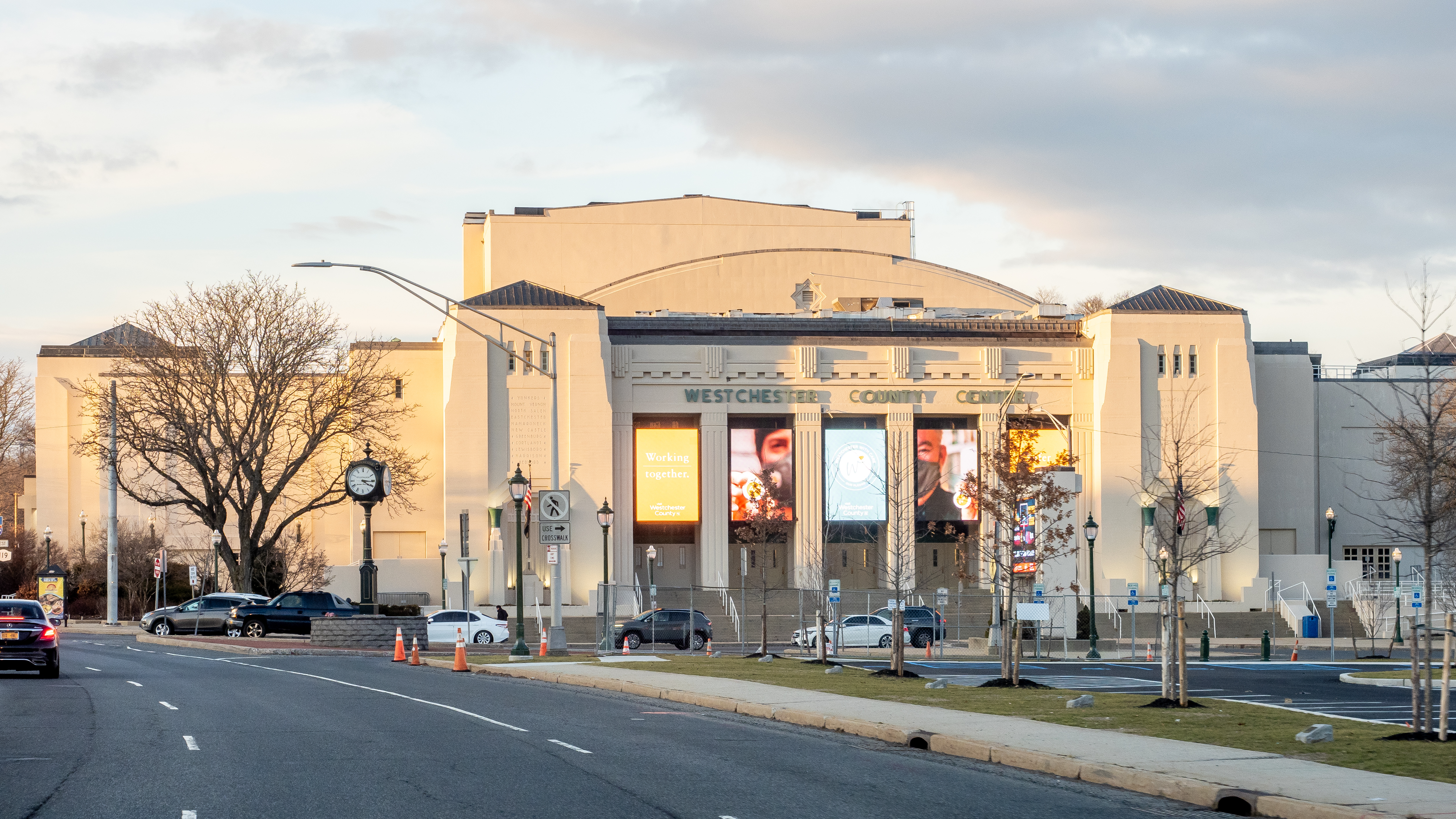
The event will be held at the Westchester County Center in White Plains, New York.

Victory Road was an annual professional wrestling event produced by Impact Wrestling (then known as Total Nonstop Action Wrestling) between 2004 and 2012. In 2013, TNA discontinued most of its monthly pay-per-view events in favor of the new pre-recorded One Night Only events. Victory Road would be revived as a "One Night Only" event in 2014, a special edition of Impact's weekly television series in 2017, and has been a monthly special for Impact Plus since the 2019 event.

On May 26, 2023, Impact Wrestling announced that the 2023 Victory Road would take place on September 8, 2023, at the Westchester County Center in White Plains, New York, as they would tape the following day the 1,000th episode of Impact!, named Impact 1000.

=== Storylines ===
The event will feature several professional wrestling matches that involve different wrestlers from pre-existing scripted feuds, plots, and storylines. Wrestlers portray heroes, villains, or less distinguishable characters in scripted events that build tension and culminate in a wrestling match or series of matches. Storylines are produced on Impact's weekly television program.

At Emergence, it was announced that Jordynne Grace would make her return to Impact Wrestling at Victory Road, after taking an hiatus from wrestling back in May. Four days later, on the subsequent episode of Impact!, Grace's old rival Deonna Purrazzo, furious that Grace's return announcement came after she lost her Impact Knockouts World Championship match to Trinity, would challenge Grace to a match at Victory Road.

On the August 31 episode of Impact!, Alisha Edwards won a 10-knockout battle royal for the right to challenge Trinity for the Impact Knockouts World Championship at Victory Road.

At Slammiversary, Kushida won an Ultimate X match to earn an Impact X Division Championship match at the time and place of his choosing. Over a month later, on the August 31 Impact!, Kushida confronted champion Lio Rush and declared he would invoke his opportunity for the title at Victory Road.

On the August 31 episode of Impact!, Chris Sabin defeated Zachary Wentz in a singles match, which granted The Motor City Machine Guns (Sabin and Impact World Champion Alex Shelley) an Impact World Tag Team Championship match against The Rascalz (Wentz and Trey Miguel) at Victory Road.

At Emergence, Kenny King retained the Impact Digital Media Championship against Johnny Swinger. After the match, King and his protege Sheldon Jean continued to attack Swinger, before being stopped by referees, security guards, and Tommy Dreamer. However, King would then assault Dreamer as well, with Kean holding back the referees and security. On the subsequent Impact!, Dreamer interrupted a promo by King and Jean, telling them about how much the match at Emergence meant to Swinger, who had learned his father-in-law died over the weekend. Dreamer then berated King and Jean for their behavior after Emergence, who had left the show before the main event. King didn't care, calling out Dreamer for being a veteran trying to take the spotlight away from younger wrestlers like himself. Dreamer would reflect on how the past year was possibly the worst in his life, from being diagnosed with skin cancer to the passings of his mother and mentor Terry Funk. He then challenged King to take the spotlight off him, offering his career for a Digital Media Championship match at Victory Road.

At Rebellion, then-Impact World Champion Josh Alexander was supposed to defend the title against Steve Maclin, but Alexander vacated the title and was pulled from the show due to a torn triceps. Maclin would defeat Kushida to win the vacant title but felt unsatisfied as he wanted to beat Alexander for it in his hometown of Toronto. Several months later at Emergence, while Alexander was competing in an eight-man tag team match, Maclin, who himself previously suffered a groin injury, returned and diverted Alexander's attention, targeting his surgically repaired triceps. On the August 31 Impact!, Impact announced that Alexander and Maclin would finally have a one-on-one match at Victory Road.

On the July 6 episode of Impact!, Bully Ray and Steve Maclin assaulted PCO, beating down backstage, pouring battery acid in his mouth, and finally lighting him on fire. PCO would be gone for the better part of a month, eventually returning on August 10 to confront Ray during his match and chasing him out of the arena. For the next few weeks, Ray would continually be targeted by PCO, never seemingly able to stop him. On the August 31 Impact!, when PCO again chased down Ray, the latter tried to explain himself by saying that he cared about PCO and that lighting him on fire was meant to kill the "monster" to bring back the "man" Carl Ouellet. Later, Impact announced on their website that Ray and PCO will face off at Victory Road in an Anything Goes match.

== Results ==
No.	Results	Stipulations	Times
1^{D}	Jake Something, Rich Swann, and Sami Callihan defeated Dirty Dango and The Design (Deaner, and Kon) by pinfall (Note: The match was taped for an Impact Digital Exclusive that aired on September 12.)	Six-man tag team match	4:48
2^{P}	Alan Angels defeated Guido Maritato by pinfall	Singles match	5:26
3^{P}	ABC (Ace Austin and Chris Bey) defeated The Most Professional Wrestling Gods (Moose and Brian Myers) by pinfall	Tag team match	8:49
4	Lio Rush (c) defeated Kushida by pinfall	Singles match for the Impact X Division Championship	10:09
5	MK Ultra (Killer Kelly and Masha Slamovich) (c) defeated The SHAWntourage (Gisele Shaw and Savannah Evans) (with Jai Vidal) by pinfall	Tag team match for the Impact Knockouts World Tag Team Championship	8:12
6	Crazzy Steve defeated Black Taurus by pinfall	Singles match	9:04
7	Tommy Dreamer defeated Kenny King (c) (with Sheldon Jean) by pinfall	Title vs. Career match for the Impact Digital Media Championship; Had Dreamer lost, he would have had to retire from in-ring competition.	12:14
8	Jordynne Grace defeated Deonna Purrazzo by pinfall	Singles match	11:48
9	PCO defeated Bully Ray by pinfall	Anything Goes match	9:46
10	The Rascalz (Trey Miguel and Zachary Wentz) (c) defeated The Motor City Machine Guns (Alex Shelley and Chris Sabin) by pinfall	Tag team match for the Impact World Tag Team Championship	13:51
11	Trinity (c) defeated Alisha Edwards (with Eddie Edwards) by pinfall	Singles match for the Impact Knockouts World Championship	8:58
12	Josh Alexander defeated Steve Maclin by pinfall	Singles match	18:45
(c) / – the champion(s) heading into the match; D / – this was a dark match; P / – the match was broadcast on the pre-show
