= Victory Road (2024) =

2024 TNA Wrestling event

- Promotional poster
- Promotion: Total Nonstop Action Wrestling
- Date: September 13, 2024
- City: San Antonio, Texas
- Venue: Boeing Center at Tech Port
- Attendance: 2,000

TNA+ Monthly Specials chronology
← Previous; Emergence	Next → Turning Point

Victory Road chronology
← Previous; 2023	Next → 2025

The 2024 Victory Road was a professional wrestling livestreaming event produced by Total Nonstop Action Wrestling. It took place on September 13, 2024, at the Boeing Center at Tech Port in San Antonio, Texas, and aired on TNA+. It is the 18th event under the Victory Road chronology.

Nine matches were contested at the event, including two on the Countdown to Victory Road pre-show. In the main event, Nic Nemeth defeated Moose to retain the TNA World Championship. In other prominent matches, Jordynne Grace defeated NXT superstar Wendy Choo to retain the TNA Knockouts World Championship, The System (Brian Myers and Eddie Edwards) defeated ABC (Ace Austin and Chris Bey) to win the TNA World Tag Team Championship, and Joe Hendry defeated Josh Alexander.

== Production ==
=== Background ===
Victory Road was an annual professional wrestling event produced by Total Nonstop Action Wrestling between 2004 and 2012. In 2013, TNA discontinued most of its monthly pay-per-view events in favor of the new pre-recorded One Night Only events. Victory Road would be revived as a "One Night Only" event in 2014, a special edition of Impact's weekly television series in 2017, and has been a monthly special for TNA+ since the 2019 event.

On June 14, 2024, at Against All Odds, it was announced that Victory Road would take place on September 13, at the Cleveland Masonic Temple in Cleveland, Ohio. However, on July 22, TNA announced that the event will be moved to the Boeing Center at Tech Port in San Antonio, Texas.

=== Storylines ===
The event will feature several professional wrestling matches that involved different wrestlers from pre-existing scripted feuds, plots, and storylines. Wrestlers portray heroes, villains, or less distinguishable characters in scripted events that build tension and culminate in a wrestling match or series of matches. Storylines are produced on TNA's weekly programs, Impact! and Xplosion.

At the end of Hard To Kill, Nic Nemeth made his TNA debut, attacking new TNA World Champion Moose. The resulting feud between the two culminated in a title match at Rebellion three months later, where Moose would retain the title. Nemeth continued to feud on and off with Moose and his stable, The System (Brian Myers, Eddie Edwards, Alisha Edwards, and Johnny Dango Curtis (JDC)) for the next few months. This led to a six-way elimination match for the TNA World Championship at Slammiversary, where Nemeth would finally capture the title; albeit he didn't pin or submit Moose to do so. At Emergence the following month, after The System had competed in an eight-man tag team match, Moose called out Nemeth for his contractual rematch. Later in the night after the show went off air, Nemeth, who defended the title in an iron man match with Josh Alexander, accepted the challenge for Victory Road.

At Sacrifice, The System's Brian Myers and Eddie Edwards captured the TNA World Tag Team Championship from ABC (Ace Austin and Chris Bey). The System would reign as champions for over four months as ABC worked out their chemistry, occasionally moving into singles competition before returning to tag team action. ABC would eventually enact their rematch clause at Slammiversary where they defeated The System to regain the titles. On the TNA Impact! following Emergence, The System kicked off the show, where Myers and Edwards announced that they would invoke their rematch clause for the TNA World Tag Team Championship, setting up a rubber match with ABC at Victory Road.

At Under Siege, The Malisha (Alisha Edwards and Masha Slamovich) defeated Spitfire (Dani Luna and Jody Threat) to win the TNA Knockouts World Tag Team Championship, with Edwards hitting Luna with a kendo stick before the end of the match. As The Malisha continued to reign, Spitfire were put through several trial matches by their mentor Lars Frederiksen before they thought about their rematch. The rematch would soon come on the Countdown to Slammiversary pre-show, but again, The Malisha won and retained due to cheating when Threat slammed her head into one of the titles placed on the corner by Edwards. Spitfire would get a measure of payback at Emergence after they and TNA Knockouts World Champion Jordynne Grace defeated The Malisha and Ash by Elegance in a six-knockout tag team match. On the following TNA Impact!, as The System stood in the ring, Spitfire confronted them to announced they secured another title match with The Malisha at Victory Road. However, should Spitfire lose, they must disband as a team. Unfortunately, on the day of Victory Road, TNA announced that Edwards, after suffering an injury at Emergence, was medically unable to compete, and would be replaced by Tasha Steelz.

At Slammiversary, Josh Alexander turned heel after delivering a low blow to Joe Hendry, eliminating him from the TNA World Championship match. After weeks of refusing to explain himself, Alexander finally addressed his actions on the August 8 TNA Impact!, stating that his work in TNA for the past four years that paved the way for the rise of Hendry and Nic Nemeth had gone overlooked. Following Emergence, after Alexander defeated Kushida in an impromptu match, Hendry comforted Kushida before being confronted by Alexander, saying he didn't forget what he did to him at Slammiversary. During the main event, when Hendry teamed with Mike Santana against They System (Moose and JDC), Alexander, who situated himself at commentary, cost Hendry and Santana the match after again low-blowing Hendry. TNA later announced a match between Alexander and Hendry to take place at Victory Road.

At Emergence, Zachary Wentz won the TNA X Division Championship in an Ultimate X match, overcoming then-champion Mike Bailey, Laredo Kid, Hammerstone, Jason Hotch, and NXT wrestler Riley Osborne. On the following TNA Impact!, Wentz celebrated winning his first singles championship in the ring before being interrupted by Bailey, who declared he would have his rematch with Wentz for the title at Victory Road.

On the September 5 TNA Impact!, Jordynne Grace hosted an open challenge for her TNA Knockouts World Championship, which was answered by NXT wrestler Karmen Petrovic. As Rosemary watched on from a balcony, Grace would retain her title, only to be the victim of a lights-out attack; the only evidence left behind was a pillow. Five days later, Grace would host another open challenge on WWE NXT, marking the first time a TNA championship was defended on WWE television. The challenge was answered by Sol Ruca, but it ended in a no contest after Grace was ambushed by Rosemary and her NXT ally Wendy Choo. The following day, Grace challenged Choo to a title match at Victory Road, which TNA made official.

On the August 1 episode of TNA Impact!, in the culmination of a budding romance storyline, PCO and Steph De Lander had an in-ring wedding ceremony, presided by TNA Director of Authority Santino Marella. Unfortunately, the ceremony would be crashed by Matt Cardona, De Lander's tag team partner on the independent scene. There, he attacked PCO with a cinderblock disguised as a present while inadvertently striking Marella. Cardona would go on to ruin the couple's honeymoon the following week, attack PCO again with the help of two people (later revealed to be Madman Fulton and Kon). Marella then threatened to sue Cardona for attacking him unless he agreed to a match with PCO on TNA Impact!, to which Cardona had it made a six-person tag team match the following week with him, De Lander, and a mystery partner against PCO, best man Rhino, and maid of honor Xia Brookside. However, Cardona then claimed to be medically disqualified from competing due to a torn pectoral muscle, and so sent Fulton and Kon to be De Lander's partners. PCO's team would still be victorious, much to De Lander's delight and Cardona's chagrin. A match between PCO and Cardona was then set for Emergence. Still, Cardona again claimed medical problems and thus had another opponent for PCO, who was revealed to be Shera. Even then, PCO managed to defeat Shera. On the subsequent episode of TNA Impact!, De Lander finally confronted Cardona in the ring for his actions. There, Cardona revealed that when he and De Lander teamed up over two years ago, De Lander had signed a contract with Cardona that lent her services to him in exchange for several benefits, which he claims effectively made her his "property." TNA eventually scheduled a tag team match for Victory Road between PCO and Rhino, and Cardona and a partner of his choosing, for which he selected De Lander. (Note: The match did not take place due to De Lander suffering a neck injury requiring surgery)

== Results ==
No.	Results	Stipulations	Times
1^{P}	Kushida defeated Leon Slater by submission	Singles match	7:52
2^{P}	Hammerstone and Jake Something defeated Eric Young and Steve Maclin by pinfall	Tag team match	7:46
3	The Hardys ("Broken" Matt Hardy and Jeff Hardy) defeated Fir$t Cla$$ (A. J. Francis and KC Navarro) by pinfall	Tag team match	9:38
4	Mike Bailey defeated Zachary Wentz (c) by pinfall	Singles match for the TNA X Division Championship	17:32
5	Spitfire (Dani Luna and Jody Threat) defeated Masha Slamovich (c) and Tasha Steelz (Note: The match was originally scheduled to be The Malisha (Alisha Edwards and Slamovich) defending the TNA Knockouts World Tag Team Championship against Spitfire, but due to Alisha still under concussion protocols (storyline), the match was changed and Steelz took Alisha's place in defending the titles.) (with Alisha Edwards) by pinfall	Tag team match for the TNA Knockouts World Tag Team Championship; Had Spitfire lost, they would have had to disband as a team.	11:09
6	Joe Hendry defeated Josh Alexander by submission	Singles match	16:52
7	The System (Brian Myers and Eddie Edwards) (with Alisha Edwards) defeated ABC (Ace Austin and Chris Bey) (c) by pinfall	Tag team match for the TNA World Tag Team Championship	15:17
8	Jordynne Grace (c) defeated Wendy Choo by pinfall	Singles match for the TNA Knockouts World Championship	11:06
9	Nic Nemeth (c) defeated Moose by pinfall	Singles match for the TNA World Championship	19:38
(c) / – the champion(s) heading into the match; P / – the match was broadcast on the pre-show
