= Victory Road (2021) =

2021 Impact Wrestling event

- Promotional poster
- Promotion: Impact Wrestling
- Date: August 17, 2021; September 17, 2021 (main event) (aired September 18, 2021)
- City: Nashville, Tennessee
- Venue: Skyway Studios

Impact Plus Monthly Specials chronology
← Previous; Emergence	Next → Knockouts Knockdown

Victory Road chronology
← Previous; 2020	Next → 2022

The 2021 Victory Road was a professional wrestling event produced by Impact Wrestling. It was taped at Skyway Studios in Nashville, Tennessee on August 17 and September 17, 2021, and aired on Impact Plus and YouTube on September 18, 2021. It was the 12th event under the Victory Road chronology, and the first Impact Plus special to stream on YouTube, following the launch of the "Impact Wrestling Insiders" membership program on the platform.

10 matches were contested at the event. In the main event, Christian Cage defeated Ace Austin to retain the Impact World Championship. In other prominent matches, Moose and W. Morrissey defeated Eddie Edwards and Sami Callihan, The Good Brothers (Doc Gallows and Karl Anderson) defeated Rich Swann and Willie Mack to retain the Impact World Tag Team Championship, Bullet Club (Chris Bey and Hikuleo) defeated FinJuice (David Finlay and Juice Robinson), and Josh Alexander defeated Chris Sabin to retain the Impact X Division Championship.

== Production ==
=== Background ===
Victory Road was an annual professional wrestling event produced by Impact Wrestling (then known as Total Nonstop Action Wrestling) between 2004 and 2012. In 2013, TNA discontinued most of its monthly pay-per-view events in favor of the new pre-recorded One Night Only events. Victory Road would be revived as a "One Night Only" event in 2014, a special edition of Impact's weekly television series in 2017, and as a monthly special for Impact Plus in 2019 and 2020.

=== Storylines ===
The event featured professional wrestling matches that involved different wrestlers from pre-existing scripted feuds and storylines. Wrestlers portray heroes, villains, or less distinguishable characters in scripted events that build tension and culminate in a wrestling match or series of matches. Storylines were produced on Impact's weekly television program.

At Emergence, Ace Austin defeated Chris Sabin, Moose, and Sami Callihan in a four-way match to become number one contender to the Impact World Championship. In the main event later that night, Christian Cage defeated Brian Myers to retain the title, after which the title match between Cage and Austin was announced for Victory Road.

Since winning the X Division Championship at Rebellion, Josh Alexander retained his title against multiple wrestlers. On the September 2 episode of Impact!, Alexander issued an open challenge to any former X Division Champion, and his challenge was answered by Jake Crist. After defeating Crist, eight-time X-Division Champion Chris Sabin came out and issued his own challenge to which the title match between Alexander and Sabin was announced for Victory Road.

On the August 19 episode of Impact!, Sami Callihan saved his old rival Eddie Edwards from an attack by W. Morrissey. The following week on Impact!, Edwards saved Callihan from an attack by Moose. Moose and Morrissey then formed an alliance against Edwards and Callihan on the September 2 episode of Impact!, where they attacked Edwards. On the September 9 episode of Impact!, Callihan saves Edwards' wife Alisha from an attack by Moose and Morrissey, then Edwards and Callihan join forces to beat them. Later it was announced that Edwards and Callihan would face Moose and Morrissey at Victory Road.

At Emergence, The Good Brothers (Doc Gallows and Karl Anderson) defeated Rich Swann and Willie Mack, and Violent By Design (Joe Doering and Rhino) in a three-way tag team match to retain their World Tag Team Championship. On the August 26 episode of Impact!, Swann and Mack defeated them in a non-title bout, but the Good Brothers took them out and planted Mack with a double powerbomb through a table. On the September 9 episode of Impact!, Anderson defeated Swann in a Bunkhouse Brawl match. The following week, Anderson explained how having Gallows by his side helped him during that match, and Mack was in the hospital and couldn't assist Swann. The two came across Mack using crutches but revealed that he was fine, and attacked them alongside Swann. Impact EVP Scott D'Amore met with Swann and Mack to announce that they will face the Good Brothers for the tag titles at Victory Road.

At Emergence, Matt Cardona defeated Rohit Raju, but was attacked by Shera afterwards. On the September 2 episode of Impact!, Raju and Shera defeated Cardona and Chelsea Green in a tag team match, after Raju took out the latter with a knee strike. On the September 16 episode of Impact!, Cardona attacked Raju and Shera earlier in the day, and was berated by Scott D'Amore when he came to him later that night. D'Amore announced that a no disqualification match between Cardona and Raju would take place at Victory Road, as long as the former does not lay his hands on the latter until that day.

== Results ==
No.	Results	Stipulations	Times
1	Steve Maclin defeated Petey Williams and TJP by pinfall	Three-way match	10:20
2	Laredo Kid defeated Black Taurus, Jake Something, John Skyler, and Trey Miguel by pinfall	X Division Five-way scramble match	8:12
3	Taylor Wilde (with Jordynne Grace and Rachael Ellering) defeated Tenille Dashwood (with Kaleb with a K and Madison Rayne) by pinfall	Singles match	9:16
4	Matt Cardona defeated Rohit Raju (with Shera) by pinfall	No Disqualification match	10:49
5	Bullet Club (Chris Bey and Hikuleo) defeated FinJuice (David Finlay and Juice Robinson) by pinfall	Tag team match	10:45
6	Moose and W. Morrissey defeated Eddie Edwards and Sami Callihan (with Alisha Edwards) by pinfall	Tag team match	15:00
7	Decay (Havok and Rosemary) (c) defeated Savannah Evans and Tasha Steelz by pinfall	Tag team match for the Impact Knockouts Tag Team Championship	7:56
8	The Good Brothers (Doc Gallows and Karl Anderson) (c) defeated Rich Swann and Willie Mack by pinfall	Tag team match for the Impact Tag Team Championship	11:26
9	Josh Alexander (c) defeated Chris Sabin by pinfall	Singles match for the Impact X Division Championship	19:01
10	Christian Cage (c) defeated Ace Austin (with Madman Fulton) by pinfall	Singles match for the Impact World Championship	12:05
(c) / – the champion(s) heading into the match
