= Bound for Glory (2022) =

2022 Impact Wrestling pay-per-view event

- Promotional poster featuring Josh Alexander and Eddie Edwards
- Promotion: Impact Wrestling
- Date: October 7, 2022
- City: Albany, New York
- Venue: Albany Armory
- Buy rate: 1,840

Pay-per-view chronology
← Previous; Slammiversary	Next → Hard To Kill

Bound for Glory chronology
← Previous; 2021	Next → 2023

The 2022 Bound for Glory was a professional wrestling pay-per-view (PPV) event produced by Impact Wrestling. It took place on October 7, 2022, at the Albany Armory in Albany, New York. It was the 18th event under the Bound for Glory chronology.

Nine matches were contested at the event, including one on the pre-show and one taped as a digital exclusive. In the main event, Josh Alexander defeated Eddie Edwards to retain the Impact World Championship. In other prominent matches, Jordynne Grace defeated Masha Slamovich to retain the Impact Knockouts World Championship, The Death Dollz (Jessicka and Taya Valkyrie) defeated VXT (Chelsea Green and Deonna Purrazzo) to win the Impact Knockouts World Tag Team Championship, Mickie James defeated Mia Yim in a Career Threatening match, and Frankie Kazarian defeated Mike Bailey to win the Impact X Division Championship in the opening bout. Raven would be inducted into the Impact Hall of Fame during the Countdown to Bound for Glory pre-show. The event also marked the debut of Dirty Dango and the returns of Bully Ray (who won the Call Your Shot Gauntlet), Joe Hendry, Matt Cardona, Rhino, Taylor Wilde, and Tommy Dreamer.

== Production ==
=== Background ===
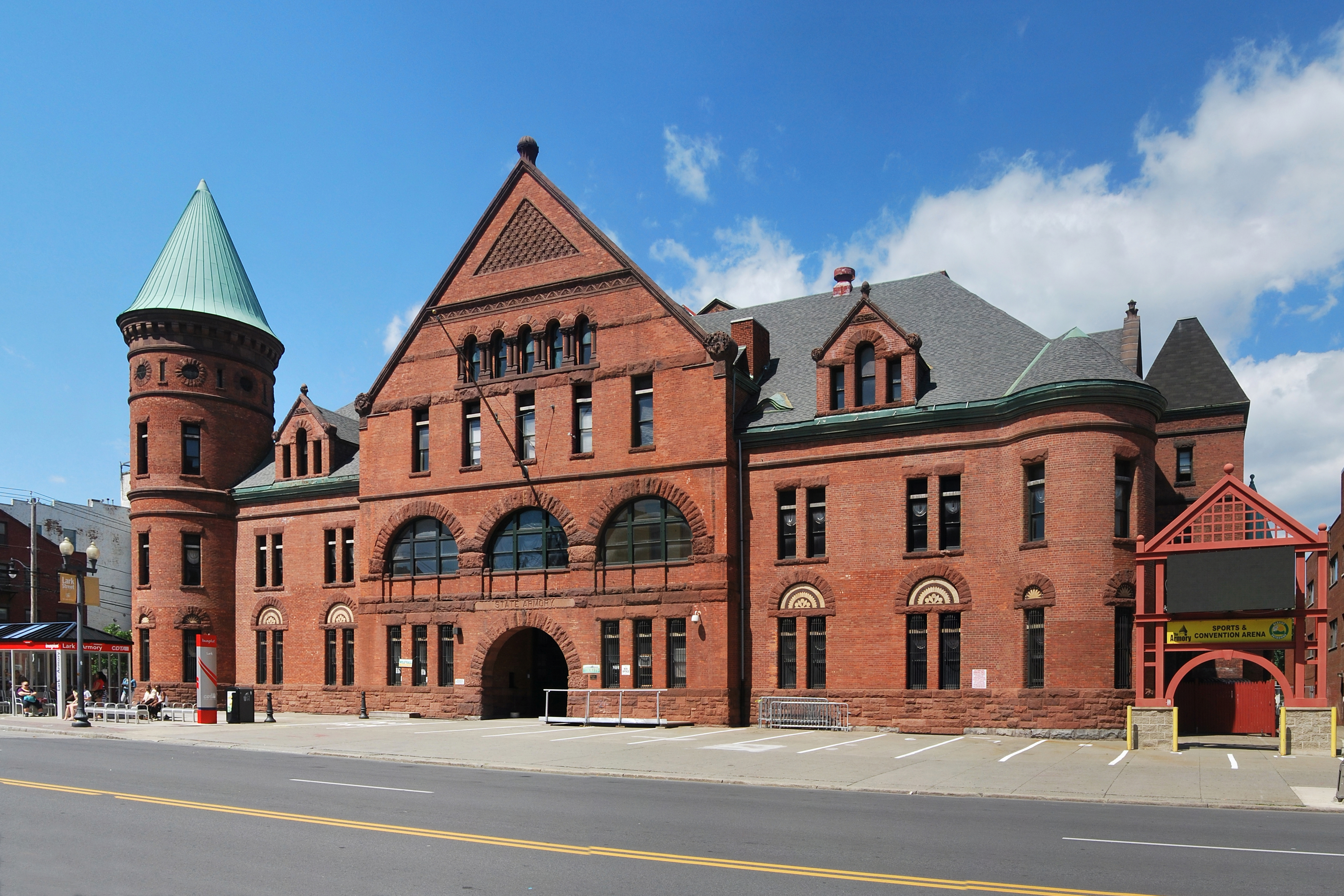
The event was held at the Albany Armory in Albany, New York.

Bound for Glory is a professional wrestling pay-per-view (PPV) event produced by Impact Wrestling. The event was created in 2005 to serve as the company's flagship PPV event, similar to WWE's WrestleMania, in which wrestlers competed in various professional wrestling match types in what was the culmination of many feuds and storylines that occurred during the calendar year. On August 4, 2022, Impact Wrestling announced that Bound for Glory would take place on October 7, 2022, at the Albany Armory in Albany, New York.

=== Storylines ===
The event featured several professional wrestling matches that involved different wrestlers from pre-existing scripted feuds, plots, and storylines. Wrestlers portrayed heroes, villains, or less distinguishable characters in scripted events that build tension and culminate in a wrestling match or series of matches. Storylines were produced on Impact's weekly television program.

On the August 4 episode of Impact!, Eddie Edwards would approach Josh Alexander to join Honor No More claiming that Impact was taking advantage of him. Alexander was uninterested in the invitation. On the August 18 episode of Impact!, Alexander would be recruited by Vincent to join HNM with him still being uninterested. In the main event, Eddie Edwards won a six-way elimination match against Bandido, Moose, Rich Swann, Sami Callihan, and Steve Maclin to become the number one contender to Josh Alexander's Impact World Championship. The two will face off in the main event of Bound for Glory. A week later, Vincent would try recruiting Alexander again. This would annoy Alexander who would instead challenge Vincent to a match and defeat him. After the match, Edwards would come to the ring to recruit and threaten Alexander. Before Alexander could answer, Edwards would be attacked by one of HNM's enemies Heath. On the September 1 episode of Impact!, Edwards would interrupt an Alexander interview to again recruit him while issuing an ultimatum. Before Alexander could answer him, Heath would attack Edwards leading to a match. That match would main event the September 8 episode of Impact! where Edwards would defeat Heath. After the match, Edwards would call out Alexander to extend his final offer to him. Alexander would decline the offer, leading to him being attacked by Honor No More's Edwards, Mike Bennett, Matt Taven and Kenny King. Heath and Swann would try to intervene, but were swiftly handled by HNM. Because of the attack, Alexander would get a chance for revenge a week later with an Impact World Tag Team Championship match against The Kingdom and would choose Swann over Heath to be his partner. The Kingdom would win that match by disqualification after Heath was caught interfering by the ref while trying to counter interference from Edwards. Later in episode, Heath would apologize backstage to Alexander and Swann. Impact Executive Vice President Scott D'Amore would advise them to get on the same page cause he made a six-man tag team match for Victory Road for them against Edwards and The Kingdom. On the September 22 episode of Impact!, Heath would attempt to make good for his actions by issuing an open challenge to HNM for a street fight. Despite HNM objections, PCO would accept. Heath would defeat PCO after Alexander and Swann prevented HNM from interfering, showing that they are on the same page. On Victory Road, Edwards and The Kingdom defeated Alexander, Swann and Heath with Edwards pinning Alexander. This was Alexander's first pinfall loss since last year's Bound for Glory. The September 29 episode of Impact! would have an in ring celebration by HNM for Edwards pinning Alexander though he is still upset with PCO losing last week. The rest of HNM would praise Edwards and show confidence in him becoming the new champion. Alexander would come out to rebuke them and insult HNM leading to a brawl. Swann, Heath and The Motor City Machine Guns would join the brawl to support Alexander. A week later a video would air of Edwards feeling forsaken by Impact and the fans. He would also mention being mad about being turned down by Alexander and wanting the Impact World title to make up for all of it. Footage would be shown of Alexander on Impact Plus's Outside The Ropes with Tom Hannifan, where he would say that his match at Bound for Glory is about who is the heart & soul of Impact Wrestling. Edwards would interrupt with security and Alisha Edwards clearing the room before any fighting happened. Alisha would tell Eddie that she is frustrated by this situation and his HNM obsession. She would give him an ultimatum that "either this ends or we end".

At Emergence, Jordynne Grace successfully defended the Impact Knockouts World Championship against Mia Yim. After the match, Grace would be confronted by the undefeated Masha Slamovich, who presented the champion with a "death warrant" (a picture of Grace crossed out in Slamovich's blood). Three weeks later on the September 1 episode of Impact!, Slamovich defeated Impact Knockouts World Tag Team Champion Deonna Purrazzo in a Knockouts World Championship number one contender's match, earning a title match against Grace at Bound for Glory. After the match, Grace would come to the ring and present Slamovich with her own "death warrant". Both women were able to choose opponents for each other in Pick Your Poison matches. At Victory Road, Grace would defeat Max the Impaler (with Father James Mitchell) in a physical match. On the September 29 episode of Impact!, Slamovich would defeat Allie Katch in a brutal Monster's Ball match. A week later, Impact Executive Vice President Scott D'Amore would host a contract signing between Grace and Slamovich. Grace would insist that she is going to end Slamovich's undefeated streak while Slamovich would tell Grace in Russian "Masha's going to kill you". They would start brawling with Slamovich putting Grace through a table before posing over her with the Knockouts title.

On the September 22 episode of Impact!, The Motor City Machine Guns (Alex Shelley and Chris Sabin) defeated Strong Openweight Tag Team Champions Aussie Open (Kyle Fletcher and Mark Davis) to earn an Impact World Tag Team Championship match against Honor No More's Matt Taven and Mike Bennett at Bound for Glory. At Victory Road, the Machine Guns defeated PCO and Vincent while The Kingdom teamed with Eddie Edwards to defeat Josh Alexander, Rich Swann and Heath in a six-man tag team match. On the September 29 episode of Impact!, the Motor City Machine Guns and The Kingdom would be involved in a brawl between Alexander, Edwards and their respective allies. A week later, Shelley (with Sabin) would defeat Taven (with Bennett and Maria).

At Victory Road, Mike Bailey successfully defended the Impact X Division Championship against Delirious to give him nine title defenses. Later that night, Impact veteran and current All Elite Wrestling (AEW) wrestler Frankie Kazarian won an Intergender Triple Threat Revolver to become the number one contender for the title, and will face Bailey at Bound for Glory. The next two episodes of Impact! would have promos where Bailey would speak about wanting to break the X Division Title defense record (Christopher Daniels-13) and Kazarian would speak about what a title win would mean to him. Kazarian would also defeat Kenny King on the October 6 episode of Impact!.

After Mickie James defeated Gisele Shaw in a Career Threatening match at Victory Road, she would be greeted backstage by Mia Yim, who James congratulated on her performance earlier that night. As such, James challenged Yim to a match at Bound for Glory, which Yim accepted. James is currently on her last "Last Rodeo", where if she lost her next match, she would retire from in-ring competition. On the September 29 episode of Impact!, Yim would have an interview with Gia Miller where she would mention wanting to be the person to end James's career due to the history they share. Shaw would interrupt scoffing that Yim could do what she could not, which would lead to a match between them. That match would happen a week later with Yim defeating Shaw with James on commentary for the match. After the match, James and Yim would have a respectful faceoff.

At Emergence, VXT (Chelsea Green and Deonna Purrazzo) defeated The Death Dollz (Rosemary and Taya Valkyrie) to win the Impact Knockouts World Tag Team Championship due to accidental interference by Jessicka, the former Havok who has now embraced a more outgoing side of her character after a loss to Masha Slamovich. Since then, Jessicka had tried to prove herself to Rosemary that she can be serious when the time called for it. On the August 25 episode of Impact!, Jessicka would defeat Alisha Edwards while VXT would defeat Jordynne Grace and Mia Yim. A week later, Purrazzo would lose to Slamovich in a contender's match while the Death Dollz had a promo where Rosemary continued to have doubts about Jessicka. On the September 8 episode of Impact!, Green (with Purrazzo) defeated Valkyrie (with Rosemary and Jessicka) after Jessicka's help backfired on her. The Death Dollz would have a promo a week later with Rosemary being upset about recent losses. Valkyrie would try to make peace by suggesting she has an idea to turn things around. At Victory Road, the Death Dollz approached Impact producer Gail Kim about a rematch with Jessicka taking Rosemary's spot, leading to a brawl with VXT that saw Jessicka easily handle the champions. As such, Jessicka and Valkyrie would challenge VXT for the titles at Bound for Glory. On the September 29 episode of Impact!, Valkyrie and Jessicka would have a tense encounter with the Swingerella's, John E. Bravo, Johnny Swinger and Zicky Dice. Later in the episode, Rosemary would talk to Father James Mitchell about her doubts of success with Jessicka. Valkyrie and Jessicka would overhear the discussion and the group would end up agreeing to come together as a team. A week later, Jessicka and Valkyrie (with Rosemary) would defeat the Swingerella's (with Swinger and Dice) with Jessicka being dominant in the match. VXT was shown watching from backstage, where they dismissed the idea they could lose.

On September 28, the Call Your Shot Gauntlet match was announced as part of the card, continuing what has become an annual tradition at Bound for Glory since 2019. Bhupinder Gujjar, Bobby Fish, Gisele Shaw, Heath, Moose, PCO, Rich Swann, Sami Callihan, and Steve Maclin were announced as participants. During the October 6 episode of Impact!, it was revealed that Eric Young, Joe Hendry, Tasha Steelz, Savannah Evans, Killer Kelly and Johnny Swinger were participants in the Gauntlet match. This meant there would be five unknown participants going into the match.

After a controversial disqualification victory in an Impact Digital Media Championship match against Bhupinder Gujjar, Brian Myers would settle his feud with Gujjar by defeating him in a ladder match on the September 22 episode of Impact!. A week later, Myers would successfully defend his title against Crazzy Steve. After the match, a cocky Myers would brag about his title reign and declare he does not have competition before issuing an open challenge for his title at Bound for Glory. Later in the show, it was announced that the match will take place on the Countdown to Bound for Glory pre-show. On the October 6 episode of Impact!, Myers would continue being cocky during a backstage promo where he insulted Delirious, Shera, Raj Singh and others about no one being good enough to beat him at Bound for Glory.

== Event ==
Other on-screen personnel
Role:	Name:
Commentators	Tom Hannifan
Commentators	Matthew Rehwoldt
Ring announcers	David Penzer
Interviewer	Gia Miller
Referees	Daniel Spencer
Referees	Darrick Moore
Referees	Brandon Tolle
French Commentators	Marc Blondin
French Commentators	"Handsome" JF

=== Digital Media Exclusive Match ===
Before the event went live on pay-per-view, Bullet Club (Ace Austin, Chris Bey, and Juice Robinson) defeated Alex Zayne, Laredo Kid, and Trey Miguel which was aired as an Impact Digital Exclusive on October 11.

=== Countdown to Bound for Glory ===
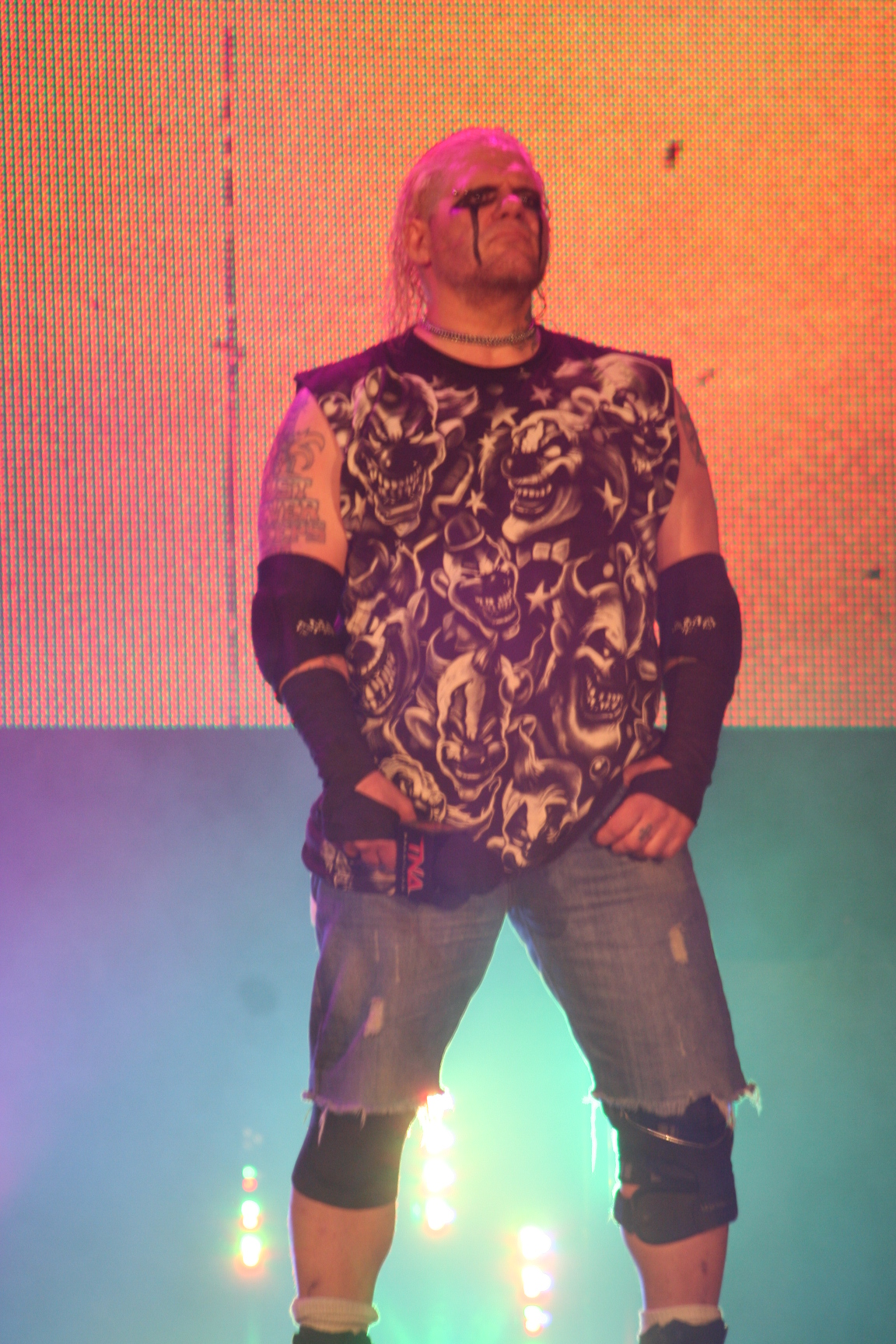
During the pre-show, Raven was inducted into the Hall of Fame by Tommy Dreamer.

During the Bound for Glory pre-show, Brian Myers defended the Impact Digital Media Championship in an open challenge, which was answered by the debuting Dirty Dango. Myers performed a spear followed by the Roster Cut to retain the title.

Also on the pre-show, Tommy Dreamer inducted Raven into the Hall of Fame. After giving his speech, Raven hugged Dreamer, only to perform a DDT on him.

=== Preliminary matches ===
The actual pay-per-view started with Mike Bailey defending the Impact X Division Championship against Frankie Kazarian. Bailey went for a shooting star knee drop, which Kazarian countered with a cutter. Kazarian went for a cover, but as Bailey kicked out, Kazarian locked him in a crossface chickenwing into a submission, winning the title for the fifth time in his career.

Next, Mickie James put her career on the line against Mia Yim. After Yim missed a cannonball, James performed the Mickie-DT to win the match.

After That, VXT (Chelsea Green and Deonna Purrazzo) defended the Impact Knockouts World Tag Team Championship against The Death Dollz (Jessicka and Taya Valkyrie) (accompanied by Rosemary). In the end, Jessicka performed the Sick-ishi Driver while Valkyrie kicking Green to win the match and the title.

In the fifth match, The Kingdom (Matt Taven and Mike Bennett) (accompanied by Maria Kanellis) defended the Impact World Tag Team Championship against The Motor City Machine Guns (Alex Shelley and Chris Sabin). Bennett tried to superkick Sabin, however, Sabin dodged, and Bennett accidentally kicked his wife, Maria, who was on the apron. Taven rolled up Sabin while putting his foot on the ropes to win the match and to retain the title for his team.

The next match saw a 20-person Intergender Call Your Shot Gauntlet, where the winner would receive a trophy and a contract they can invoke anytime within one year for a championship match of their choosing. The final four were Bobby Fish, Bully Ray, Rich Swann and Steve Maclin. After Swann and Fish were respectively eliminated, Ray pinned Maclin after performing the Bully Bomb.

In the penultimate match, Jordynne Grace defended the Impact Knockouts World Championship against Masha Slamovich. In the end, Slamovich positioned Grace on the top turnbuckle. only for Grace to perform an avalanched Grace Driver to retain the title.

=== Main event ===
In the main event, Josh Alexander defended the Impact World Championship against Eddie Edwards. In the end, Alexander performed the C4 Spike to win the match and retained the title.

== Results ==
No.	Results	Stipulations	Times
1^{D}	Bullet Club (Ace Austin, Chris Bey, and Juice Robinson) defeated Alex Zayne, Laredo Kid, and Trey Miguel by pinfall (Note: The match was taped for an Impact Digital Exclusive that aired on October 11.)	Six-man tag team match	7:15
2^{P}	Brian Myers (c) defeated Dirty Dango by pinfall	Singles match for the Impact Digital Media Championship	7:06
3	Frankie Kazarian defeated Mike Bailey (c) by submission	Singles match for the Impact X Division Championship	12:30
4	Mickie James defeated Mia Yim by pinfall	Career Threatening match Had Mickie James lost, she would have been forced to retire from in-ring competition.	10:56
5	The Death Dollz (Jessicka and Taya Valkyrie) (with Rosemary) defeated VXT (Chelsea Green and Deonna Purrazzo) (c) by pinfall	Tag team match for the Impact Knockouts World Tag Team Championship	7:23
6	The Kingdom (Matt Taven and Mike Bennett) (c) (with Maria Kanellis-Bennett) defeated The Motor City Machine Guns (Alex Shelley and Chris Sabin) by pinfall	Tag team match for the Impact World Tag Team Championship	16:40
7	Bully Ray won by last eliminating Steve Maclin	20-person Intergender Call Your Shot Gauntlet; The winner receives a trophy and a contract they can invoke anytime within one year for a championship match of their choosing.	29:18
8	Jordynne Grace (c) defeated Masha Slamovich by pinfall	Singles match for the Impact Knockouts World Championship	16:01
9	Josh Alexander (c) defeated Eddie Edwards by pinfall	Singles match for the Impact World Championship	28:03
(c) / – the champion(s) heading into the match; D / – this was a dark match; P / – the match was broadcast on the pre-show

=== Call Your Shot Gauntlet entrances and eliminations ===
Draw	Entrant	Eliminated by	Order	Elimination(s)
1	Eric Young	Rich Swann	16	1
2	Joe Hendry	Moose	3	0
3	Steve Maclin	Bully Ray	19	5
4	Rich Swann	Steve Maclin	17	1
5	PCO	Moose	4	0
6	Savannah Evans	Tasha Steelz	1	0
7	Johnny Swinger	Bully Ray and Tommy Dreamer	7	0
8	Tasha Steelz	Bully Ray	6	2
9	Killer Kelly	Tasha Steelz	2	0
10	Moose	Steve Maclin	11	4
11	Sami Callihan	Deaner*	5	0
12	Taylor Wilde	Matt Cardona	12	0
13	Gisele Shaw	Matt Cardona	13	0
14	Bully Ray	Winner	—	3
15	Tommy Dreamer	Steve Maclin	8	1
16	Rhino	Moose	9	0
17	Bhupinder Gujjar	Eric Young	15	1
18	Heath	Moose and Steve Maclin	10	0
19	Bobby Fish	Steve Maclin	18	0
20	Matt Cardona	Bhupinder Gujjar	14	2

- (*) – Deaner was not an official participant in the match.
