= Victory Road (2020) =

2020 Impact Wrestling pay-per-view event

- Promotional poster featuring Eddie Edwards, Eric Young, Susie, and Deonna Purrazzo
- Promotion: Impact Wrestling
- Date: October 3, 2020
- City: Nashville, Tennessee
- Venue: Skyway Studios
- Attendance: 0 (behind closed doors) (Note: The event was held without a paying audience due to the COVID-19 pandemic in the United States.)

Impact Plus Monthly Specials chronology
← Previous; Lockdown (cancelled)	Next → Turning Point

Victory Road chronology
← Previous; 2019	Next → 2021

The 2020 Victory Road was a professional wrestling event produced by Impact Wrestling. The event took place on October 3, 2020 at the Skyway Studios in Nashville, Tennessee, and aired exclusively on Impact Plus. It was the 11th event in the Victory Road chronology.

Nine matches were contested at the event. In the main event, Eric Young successfully defended the Impact World Championship against Eddie Edwards. In other prominent matches, Deonna Purrazzo successfully defended the Impact Knockouts Championship against Susie, while Rohit Raju lost by count out against Willie Mack to retain the Impact X Division Championship.

== Production ==
=== Background ===
Victory Road is an annual professional wrestling event produced by Impact Wrestling (then known as Total Nonstop Action Wrestling). The first one was held in November 2004, but was replaced by Unbreakable in 2005. Victory Road continued to be a regular monthly pay-per-view event for TNA until 2012, when the promotion discontinued most of its monthly pay-per-views in 2013 in favor of the new pre-recorded One Night Only events. It was revived in 2014 as a "One Night Only" event, a special episode of Impact's weekly television series in 2017, and in 2019 as a monthly special for Impact Plus. On September 23, 2020, Impact announced that Victory Road would return as an Impact Plus Monthly Special on October 3.

==== Impact of the COVID-19 pandemic ====
As a result of the COVID-19 pandemic, Impact had to present the majority of its programming from a behind closed doors set at Skyway Studios in Nashville, Tennessee beginning in April.

=== Storylines ===
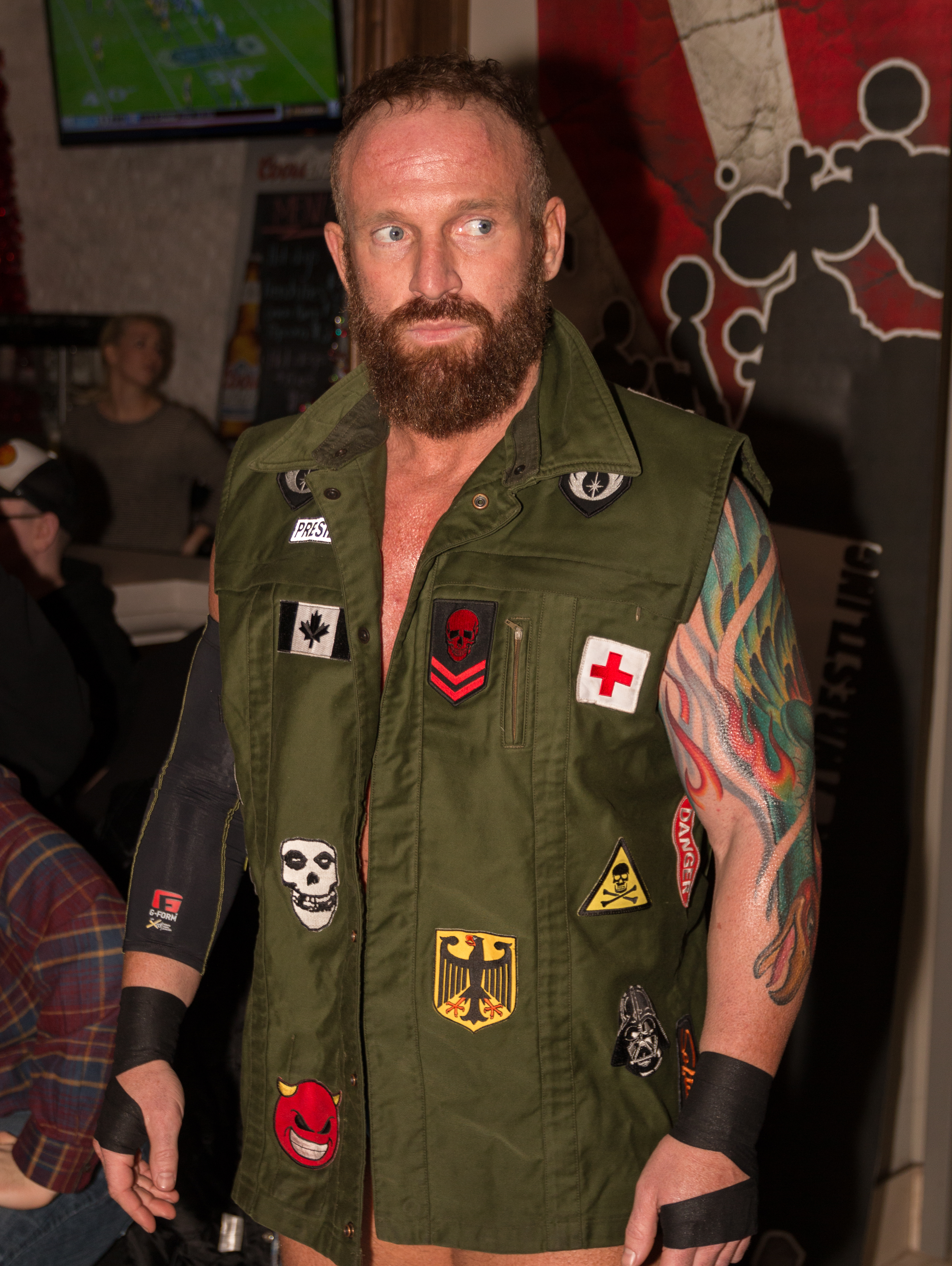
Eric Young (pictured in 2015), walked into Victory Road as Impact World Champion.

The event featured professional wrestling matches that involved different wrestlers from pre-existing scripted feuds and storylines. Wrestlers portrayed villains, heroes, or less distinguishable characters in scripted events that build tension and culminate in a wrestling match or series of matches.

On the September 15 episode of Impact!, Impact Executive Vice President Scott D'Amore announced that Eric Young, who defeated Eddie Edwards during the September 1 episode to win the Impact World Championship for a second time, would defend the title against Rich Swann, who Young severely injured during a Five-way elimination match for the title at Slammiversary and caused him to announce his (kayfabe) retirement, at Bound for Glory. During the following episode, an irate Young randomly attacked The Deaners (Cody Deaner and Cousin Jake) whilst they were making their way to the ring. During the attack, D'Amore came to the ring to plead with Young to stop, only to get pushed into a turnbuckle by Young. As Young had D'Amore pinned in the corner of the ring, Edwards, who was limping as a result of a submission move performed during his defeat, attacked Young, forcing him to flee the ring. After the attack, an angry Edwards confronted D'Amore backstage asking why Swann was getting a title shot over him. D'Amore then announced that Edwards would challenge Young for the title at Victory Road, meaning the winner would defend the title against Swann at Bound for Glory.

On August 18, during Night 1 of Emergence, Rohit Raju defeated Chris Bey and TJP in a three-way match to win the Impact X Division Championship. On the September 15 episode of Impact!, he had Bey, TJP and Trey compete in a three-way match next week to determine who will face him for the X Division Championship immediately afterwards, which Trey won but Raju quickly defeated him in his first title defense. On the September 29 episode of Impact!, Raju announced that he will start the Defeat Rohit Challenge at Victory Road, giving the opportunity to anyone he has not defeated before.

On July 18, at Slammiversary, Kylie Rae won a Gauntlet for the Gold match to become number one contender for the Impact Knockouts Championship, and on that same night, Deonna Purrazzo defeated Jordynne Grace to win said Knockouts title for the first time. On the September 22 episode of Impact!, Rae announced that she was challenging Purrazzo for the Knockouts Championship at Bound for Glory. The following week, Purrazzo was told that she was going to defend her title against Susie at Victory Road. During that same episode, Susie was concerned that her friend Rae would be mad if she won the Knockouts Championship, but Rae said she would rather face her for the title at Bound for Glory than a bully like Purrazzo.

On the September 1 episode of Impact!, Jordynne Grace interrupted Knockouts Champion Deonna Purrazzo's Black Tie Affair, congratulating her for pushing her to the limits during both of their title matches, but said that her reign would not last long. Tenille Dashwood made her return to Impact and announced that she was coming after Purrazzo's title. Grace told her that she was not in line for a title opportunity because she never shows up for work. The two would have a match on the September 22 episode of Impact!, with Dashwood winning after a distraction from her photographer Kaleb with a K. The following week, Grace would win the rematch after Kaleb's distraction failed and she made Dashwood submit. Afterwards, Kaleb challenged Grace to another match on behalf of Dashwood at Victory Road.

On the August 11 episode of Impact!, Brian Myers made his in-ring return for the company, answering Eddie Edwards' open challenge for the Impact World Championship but was defeated. He went on to face Willie Mack in a trio of matches during Night 2 of Emergence and the September 8 and 15 episodes of Impact!, winning 2-1. The following weeks saw Myers butting heads with Tommy Dreamer, leading to the latter to challenge him at Victory Road.

On the July 21 episode of Impact!, The Motor City Machine Guns (Alex Shelley and Chris Sabin) defeated The North (Ethan Page and Josh Alexander), and won the Impact World Tag Team Championship for a second time. On August 18, during Night 1 of Emergence, they defeated them to retain their titles. On the September 8 episode of Impact!, after the Guns had another successful title defense against The Rascalz (Dez and Wentz), The North (along with Ace Austin and Madman Fulton) attacked them, before The Good Brothers (Doc Gallows and Karl Anderson) came in to help out with the former. On September 30, Impact announced that The Motor City Machine Guns will defend their World Tag Team titles against The Good Brothers, The North, and Austin and Fulton in a four-way match at Bound for Glory. They added that a member from each team (Austin, Anderson, Shelley and Alexander) will face each other in a free-for-all at Victory Road.

Heath Miller, formerly known as Heath Slater in WWE, made his Impact debut at Slammiversary as simply "Heath", saying he was here for an open challenge. Rohit Raju interrupted him by saying it had already passed and that he won't be in the World Title match, resulting in Heath beating Raju up and throwing him outside the ring, revealing his "free agent" t-shirt towards the end. Later in the night, Heath caught up with his friend Rhino before being informed by Impact EVP Scott D'Amore that he doesn't work for them and must leave the premises. On the July 28 episode of Impact!, Heath accepted Moose's invitation to challenge him for the TNA World Heavyweight Championship next week, and was told by D'Amore that he will be added to the Impact roster if he won his match. The following week, Heath got hit with a low blow by Moose as the referee was down, and lost his match. Heath then started the "#Heath4IMPACT" campaign to gain support from social media who want to see him join the company, including celebrity endorsements from David Hasselhoff, Flava Flav, Nancy Kerrigan and Chuck Norris. On the September 29 episode of Impact!, after being jumped by Reno Scum (Adam Thornstowe and Luster the Legend) who retrieved the wad of cash they stole from Hernandez, Rhino went to D'Amore demanding a tag team match between him and Heath against Reno Scum, resulting in D'Amore making it an unsanctioned match because of Heath not being on the roster.

== Event ==
Other on-screen personnel
Commentators	Josh Mathews
Commentators	Madison Rayne
Ring announcer	David Penzer
Referees	Brandon Tolle
Referees	Daniel Spencer
Interviewer	Gia Miller

=== Preliminary matches ===
The opening match of the event was a tag team bout between The Rascalz (Dez and Wentz) and XXXL (Acey Romero and Larry D). Wentz utilizes his speed to dodge Romero early in the match, managing to send him to the outside. Dez tags in and dives on Romero who takes him out, and continues to get demolished in the ring by Larry D, who lands a falcon arrow for a two count. Romero tags in to deliver a back suplex on Dez who kicks out at two, leaving him open for Larry D to tag in and grind his boot on Dez's neck that leads to a powerbomb. Dez makes the tag to Wentz, who gives Larry D numerous kicks and a standing moonsault for the cover, but Romero breaks up the pin. Dez tags back in but gets sandwiched by both Larry D and Romero, the former hitting a running splash on him, but Wentz interrupts the cover. Wentz hits the dive onto Romero on the outside, but gets taken out by Larry D with a clothesline in the ring, who in turn gets leveled by Dez who then hits the "Final Flash" on him to give the Rascalz the win.

The second match was Brian Myers versus Tommy Dreamer. The two go back-and-forth with arm drag takedowns into armbars onto each other, with Myers sending Dreamer shoulder first into the ring post, and hitting a suplex for one. Myers continuously drives his knee into Dreamer's back and applies the chin lock, loses control after getting caught in an inside cradle for a two count, but regains the hold afterwards. Dreamer fights back after avoiding Myers' leg sweep, hits him with a baseball slide to the outside, and lands a diving clothesline off the apron. Back in the ring, Dreamer gets an elbow shot on Myers and plants him with a sitout powerbomb for two, then Myers comes back with a double-underhook DDT for the cover, but Dreamer breaks it by reaching the ropes. Myers misses the charge and gets hit with a cutter by Dreamer who gets the near fall. Myers takes out Dreamer and heads to the top rope, only to get flipped off and onto the mat, leaving him open to a DDT by Dreamer but stops the cover by putting his foot on the ropes. Dreamer goes to the top, but Myers knocks the ropes to send him back down to the mat, and catches him with a running clothesline to win the match.

Next, X Division Champion Rohit Raju entered the ring to start the Defeat Rohit Challenge with his title on the line. Willie Mack appears to accept his challenge and makes his way to the ring. After a lockup and being pushed into the corner, Raju gets a side headlock on Mack, but gets knocked down after attempting a shoulder tackle. Mack hits Raju with a spinning arm drag and a hurricanrana that sends him to the outside, who then returns to the ring to trade shots with him, but goes outside again after taking a spinning heel kick. Raju fights back after sending Mack to the ropes and hitting him a neckbreaker and a series of elbow shots, but only gets consecutive two counts. Mack gets Raju with an inverted atomic drop followed by a clothesline and a back elbow, leading to a standing moonsault for two. Raju escapes the stunner attempt and applies the crossface on Mack in the center of the ring, but he powers out to only get hit with a running knee shot and covered for a two count. Raju climbs to the top rope and attempts the double stomp, but is met with a back elbow and an exploder suplex from Mack for a near fall. The two then collide with each other in the corner, causing Raju to roll to the outside and get counted out, allowing Mack to win the match but still retain his title.

The fourth match was between Tenille Dashwood (with Kaleb with a K) and Jordynne Grace. After both women trade side headlocks with each other, Grace traps Dashwood in a head scissors, splashes on her in the corner and smashes her head on the turnbuckle. Dashwood avoids a splash from Grace and gets some offense, only to get caught in the ropes for a neckbreaker. Grace sends Dashwood to the barricade but also hits it after a running charge, leaving her open to getting hit on the steel steps. Back in the ring, Dashwood applies a submission hold on Grace that she escapes and the two deliver quick pin attempts onto each other. Dashwood puts Grace into the tree of woe and pulls the hair to wrench her neck to the bottom turnbuckle, but gets flipped off the top rope to the ring. The two exchange blows and Grace plants Dashwood with body slams and a spinebuster for a two count, with Dashwood retaliating with a butterfly suplex but also gets two. Grace lands the Vader Bomb on Dashwood for the near fall, but as she locks in the sleeper, Kaleb distracts the referee who doesn't see Dashwood tap out. Dashwood hits Grace with the "Spotlight Kick" and pins her to win the match.

Next, an unsanctioned tag team match was contested between Reno Scum (Adam Thornstowe and Luster the Legend) and Rhino and Heath. The match starts with Rhino and Luster trading submission holds and blows with one another before the former applies an arm wringer and tags in Heath to continue the assault. Thornstowe tags in and puts an armbar on Heath, who tags Rhino to allow him to work on the arm before tagging back in the ring. Luster manages to hit a clothesline from the outside while Thornstowe distracts the referee, tags in and shifts the momentum to Reno Scum's side, attacking Heath with a knee drop and tag Thornstowe back in to hit a drop kick. After being worked over at Reno Scum's corner, Heath gets the running knee strike on Thornstowe and tags Rhino, who hits the belly-to-belly suplex but Luster stops the pin. Rhino throws Thornstowe out of the ring, but gets caught in a double clothesline with Luster, which allows Heath to tag himself in but gets hit with a big boot instead. Thornstowe tags in but Luster gets hit with a "Gore" from Rhino, who gets taken out with a superkick but a second one is blocked by Heath, who then hits him with the "Wake Up Call" for the win.

The sixth match was Trey Miguel versus Moose. Moose dominates Miguel by throwing him into the corner, ignoring his strikes and hurricanrana attempt, and giving Miguel a chop that sends him to the mat. Moose thwarts Miguel's top-rope attack by throwing him back into the middle of the ring, and continues his assault with the Garvin stomp, a standing drop kick and a Rock Bottom, all while sending a message to EC3 through the camera. Miguel fights back with a flurry of kicks that sends Moose to the outside, a pair of dives that pushes him into the guard rail, but Miguel gets caught after attempting a moonsault and slammed into the apron. As Moose rolls Miguel back into the ring, an EC3 logo appears on the screen, leaving him distracted for Miguel to get the roll up on Moose and get the win. After the match, Moose heads outside to the production truck but does not find EC3, exiting it to find his TNA World Heavyweight Championship surrounded by candles. EC3 appears from behind and attacks Moose, telling him there will be a funeral.

The seventh match was a four-way match that involved Ace Austin (with Madman Fulton), Josh Alexander (with Ethan Page), Karl Anderson (with Doc Gallows), and Alex Shelley (with Chris Sabin). Shelley and Anderson begin the match, with the former putting a wrist lock on the latter and taking him down, leading Anderson to tag in Austin. Shelley gets hit with a standing dropkick by Austin, but fights back with a back body drop and a front facelock into the corner, allowing Alexander to tag himself in and give Austin a big boot that sends him outside. Anderson tags in and gets a knee to the back from Alexander who covers him, but Shelley breaks the pin before Austin tags back in to get an uppercut from Anderson, who tags Shelley back in the ring. Shelley applies a single-leg Boston crab on both Austin and Alexander simultaneously, but Austin escapes and lands an enzuigiri on Shelley, continuing the assault with an armbar, sliding a card between his fingers, and a scoop slam. Austin misses the top-rope twisting senton and gets planted by Shelley with a snap dragon suplex, both of them tag in Alexander and Anderson respectively. After the referee gets accidentally knocked down, the four non-competitors get involved in the match, before they get ejected by the woken up referee. Back in the ring, Shelley tags himself in and superkicks Anderson, goes over to the corner occupied by Austin and Alexander, and hits the Tower of Doom before going up top for a frog splash on the latter, getting a near fall after Anderson breaks the pin. Alexander hits a double underhook piledriver on Shelley to pick up the win.

In the penultimate match, Deonna Purrazzo (with Kimber Lee) defended the Impact Knockouts Championship against Susie (with Kylie Rae). Purrazzo dominates early in the match with submission holds and strikes to Susie's arm, but Susie gets control after a side headlock and a bulldog to Purrazzo for a one count, and hits a dropkick that forces her to the outside. After landing a suicide dive on Purrazzo and Lee, Susie brings the former back in the ring and goes to the top rope, only for Purrazzo to flip her off into the mat and continue to target the arm. After some clubbing blows to Susie's back, Purrazzo throws her to the corner and goes for a charge, but gets caught in a sunset flip that she escapes. Purrazzo hits a back elbow and a short-arm clothesline for a two count, goes for the corner charge again, but hits her shoulder into the ring post. Susie takes advantage of Purrazzo's state with a monkey flip, a Thesz press, various palm strikes and chops, and the arachnorana, but only gets a two count. Susie hits the top-rope diving crossbody, but the referee gets preoccupied by Lee, allowing Purrazzo to hit a knee lift and a Russian leg sweep that leads into the Fujiwara armbar, but Susie escapes from it. Purrazzo goes to the top, but gets caught in Susie's head scissors and goes down on the mat, leaving her open for the "Panic Switch" that she counters into the Fujiwara armbar, and then applies the "Venus de Milo" that forces Susie to submit. After the match, Purrazzo and Lee turn their attention to Rae, with the latter holding her as the former destroys Susie's other arm with the Fujiwara armbar.

=== Main event ===
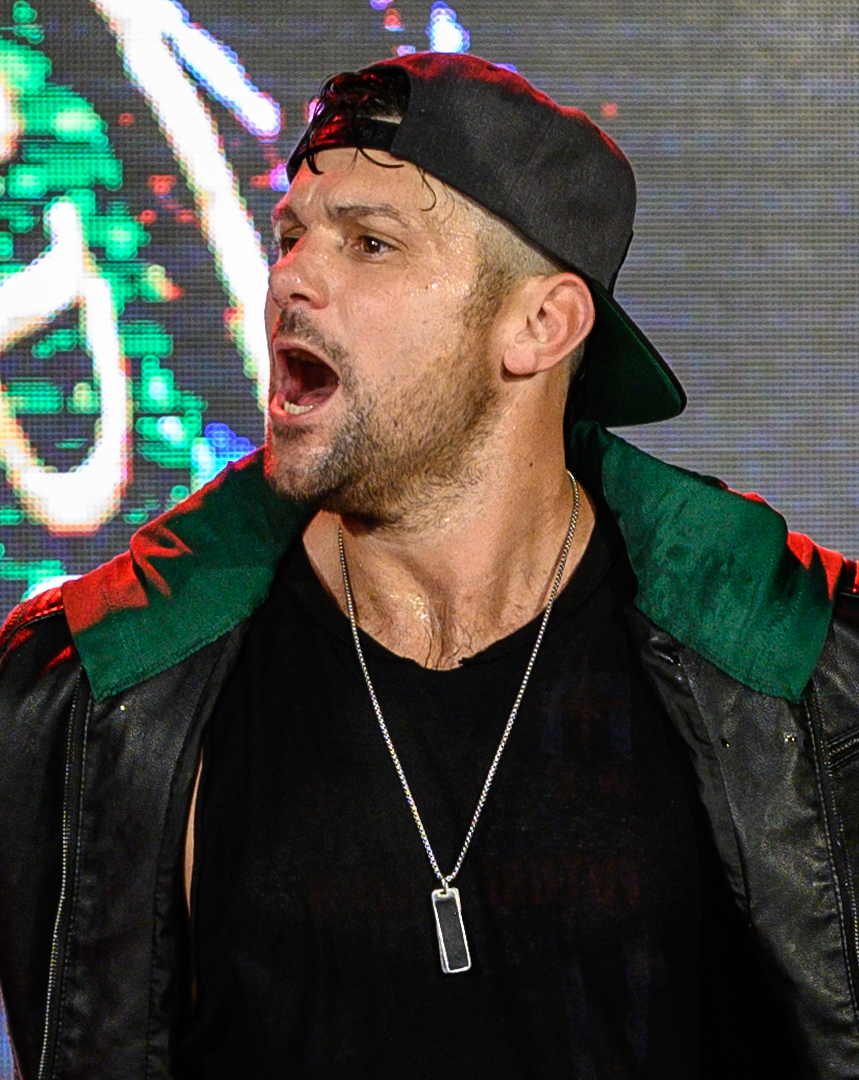
Eddie Edwards was defeated by Eric Young for the Impact World Championship at Victory Road.

In the main event, Eric Young defended the Impact World Championship against Eddie Edwards. Edwards hits a big boot on Young that immediately sends him outside, and the two brawl at ringside before Edwards enters the ring to jump over and land on Young. After hitting a clothesline and suicide dive from the ring, Edwards continues to batter Young as he bleeds from the corner of his left eye, but gets back body dropped on the ramp while attempting a piledriver. Young counters Edwards' attempt to whip him into the ring post, rolls him back in the ring to lay more offense, but gets hit with an inverted atomic drop and overhead belly-to-belly suplex instead. Edwards sends Young to the corner and charges at him, but hits his head on the top turnbuckle and is pulled between the ropes, leaving him open for Young to hit a neckbreaker onto the middle turnbuckle. Edwards gets the backpack stunner on Young for two, goes to the top rope but is put into the tree of woe, allowing Young to smash his knee on the apron, the ring steps and into the barricade. After hitting the Russian legsweep and applying a leg lock, Young gets taken out with a suplex by Edwards, and the two exchange blows with each other. Edwards lands two "Blue Thunder Bombs" on Young for consecutive near falls, gives him a superkick to set up for the "Boston Knee Party", but Young counters it with a neckbreaker followed by a diving elbow drop for a pair of two counts. Edwards powers out of a piledriver attempt and lands the tiger driver for two, grabs Young to the corner and hits a "Blue Thunder Bomb" off the second rope for another two count. Young gets placed on the top rope, manages to push Edwards knees-first onto the mat, but gets hit with the "Boston Knee Party" and breaks the cover by putting his foot on the rope. Edwards attempts to go for the "Emerald Flowsion", but Young kicks his knee and hits the piledriver, locking in a knee bar that forces Edwards to submit and retain his title. After the match, Young grabs a steel chair to continue hurting Edwards, but Rich Swann arrives to save him.

== Reception ==
Scott Slimmer of 411Mania reviewed the event and gave it a 6 out of 10, which was higher than last year's event that got a 4.5 out of 10. He called it "a solid but unspectacular show", praising the Knockouts Championship match for being "surprisingly competitive and compelling" and picked the World Title bout as "highlight of the night", concluding that: "Victory Road certainly wasn't particularly memorable, but it served as a workable leadup show to Bound for Glory." Bob Kapur of Slam Wrestling gave it 4 out of 5 stars. He wrote that: "[T]his Impact Plus special felt like an extended episode of the company's weekly Tuesday night show. That included the usual slate of good and bad, with the in-ring action fairly strong throughout. For subscribers, this was a fine offering, but there was nothing so mind-blowing that it would entice non-subscribers to sign up."

== Aftermath ==
Rohit Raju issued another Defeat Rohit Challenge on the October 6 episode of Impact!, which was answered by Jordynne Grace who beat him, but he changed the rules so that the X Division Championship was not on the line. Afterwards, Impact EVP Scott D'Amore told Raju that he would be defending his title at Bound for Glory in a six-way scramble that involves Grace, Mack, Trey, TJP and Chris Bey.

On the October 6 episode of Impact!, EC3 conducted the funeral for the TNA World Heavyweight Championship by dropping it off a bridge, claiming that it was done to "free Moose." Three days later, Impact announced that EC3 will face Moose at Bound for Glory in an undisclosed location.

Heath met with Scott D'Amore on the October 6 episode of Impact! to discuss his contract, resulting in the latter informing the former of all the various things he did during his time with the company and threw his proposed contract in the air as he left. The following week, Rhino told Heath that he got him a spot in the Call Your Shot Gauntlet match at Bound for Glory, with the catch that if neither of them win the match, they will both be without a job in Impact.

Brian Myers and Tommy Dreamer had a rematch against each other on the October 6 episode of Impact!, the former losing by disqualification after using a kendo stick on the latter. On the October 27 episode of Impact!, they would meet again in a Hardcore Halloween match, with Dreamer winning the bout after Swoggle attacked Myers' testicles with a pair of tongs and sending him through a table. The following week, during an interview where Swoggle proclaimed to be at home in Impact Wrestling, Myers interrupted by calling him "a sideshow attraction", ripped up his autobiography and pushed him to the floor. Six days later, it was announced that Myers will go against Swoggle in a match at Turning Point.

== Results ==
No.	Results	Stipulations	Times
1	The Rascalz (Dez and Wentz) defeated XXXL (Acey Romero and Larry D) by pinfall	Tag team match	9:27
2	Brian Myers defeated Tommy Dreamer by pinfall	Singles match	10:55
3	Willie Mack defeated Rohit Raju (c) by countout	Singles match for the Impact X Division Championship	11:11
4	Tenille Dashwood (with Kaleb with a K) defeated Jordynne Grace by pinfall	Singles match	12:17
5	Heath and Rhino defeated Reno Scum (Adam Thornstowe and Luster the Legend) by pinfall	Unsanctioned tag team match	10:36
6	Trey Miguel defeated Moose by pinfall	Singles match	8:19
7	Josh Alexander (with Ethan Page) defeated Alex Shelley (with Chris Sabin), Ace Austin (with Madman Fulton) and Karl Anderson (with Doc Gallows) by pinfall	Four-way match	14:37
8	Deonna Purrazzo (with Kimber Lee) (c) defeated Susie (with Kylie Rae) by submission	Singles match for the Impact Knockouts Championship	13:00
9	Eric Young (c) defeated Eddie Edwards by submission	Singles match for the Impact World Championship	23:43
(c) / – the champion(s) heading into the match
