= TNA Victory Road =

Professional wrestling event series

Victory Road
- Promotions: Total Nonstop Action Wrestling
- First event: Victory Road (2004)
- Last event: Victory Road (2025)

Victory Road was a professional wrestling TNA+ event held by Total Nonstop Action Wrestling. Victory Road was initially the first three-hour pay-per-view card held by the promotion in November 2004. In 2006, it became an annual pay-per-view for the month of July. All events except for the 2008 edition have been held inside the Impact Zone. It was announced in January 2011 that the event would be moved from July to March, switching places with TNA's traditional March PPV, Destination X.

The PPV event was canceled in December 2012, but it was revived as a One Night Only PPV in 2014, a television special in 2017, and as an Impact Plus Monthly Special in 2019, effectively placing the event as a "victory road" en route to Bound for Glory.

== History ==
Victory Road was a pay-per-view event consisting of a main event and undercard that feature championship matches and other various matches. The inaugural event took place on November 7, 2004 at the Impact Zone in Orlando, Florida. All Victory Road PPVS have taken place at the Impact Zone, except for Victory Road (2008), which took place at the Reliant Arena in Houston, Texas.

Victory Road (2004) was the very first 3-hour pay-per-view produced by TNA. It did not take place in 2005 as it was replaced by Unbreakable. Beginning in 2006, Victory Road became a permanent PPV on the TNA schedule.

From 2006 to 2010, Victory Road took place in the month of July. Beginning with the 2011 event, it took place in the month of March. Victory Road was switched with TNA's traditional March PPV, Destination X.

== Events ==
#	Event	Date	City	Venue	Main event	Ref.
1	Victory Road (2004)	November 7, 2004	Orlando, Florida	TNA Impact! Zone	Jeff Jarrett (c) vs. Jeff Hardy in a ladder match for the NWA World Heavyweight Championship	
2	Victory Road (2006)	July 16, 2006	Orlando, Florida	TNA Impact! Zone	Christian Cage vs. Samoa Joe vs. Scott Steiner vs. Sting in a four-way match to become number one contender to the NWA World Heavyweight Championship	
3	Victory Road (2007)	July 15, 2007	Orlando, Florida	TNA Impact! Zone	TNA World Heavyweight Champion Kurt Angle and TNA X Division Champion Samoa Joe vs. TNA World Tag Team Champions Team 3D (Brother Devon and Brother Ray) in a tag team match for all the championships.	
4	Victory Road (2008)	July 13, 2008	Houston, Texas	Reliant Arena	Samoa Joe (c) vs. Booker T for the TNA World Heavyweight Championship	
5	Victory Road (2009)	July 19, 2009	Orlando, Florida	TNA Impact! Zone	Kurt Angle (c) vs. Mick Foley for the TNA World Heavyweight Championship	
6	Victory Road (2010)	July 11, 2010	Orlando, Florida	TNA Impact! Zone	Rob Van Dam (c) vs. Abyss vs. Jeff Hardy vs. Mr. Anderson in a four-way match for the TNA World Heavyweight Championship	
7	Victory Road (2011)	March 13, 2011	Orlando, Florida	Impact Zone	Sting (c) vs. Jeff Hardy for the TNA World Heavyweight Championship	
8	Victory Road (2012)	March 18, 2012	Orlando, Florida	Impact Zone	Bobby Roode vs. Sting in a No Holds Barred match	
9	One Night Only: Victory Road	December 5, 2014 (Note: The event was taped on May 10, 2014.)	Orlando, Florida	Impact Zone	12-man Gauntlet battle royal match for a future shot at the TNA World Heavyweight Championship	
10	One Night Only: Victory Road 2016	May 20, 2016 (Note: The event was taped on March 17–19, 2016.)	Orlando, Florida	Impact Zone	Ethan Carter III vs. Eli Drake	
11	One Night Only: Victory Road – Knockouts Knockdown	April 14, 2017 (Note: The event was taped on March 3–4, 2017.)	Orlando, Florida	Impact Zone	Alisha Edwards, Leva Bates, ODB and Santana Garrett vs. Angelina Love, Diamanté, Laurel Van Ness and Rosemary in an eight-woman tag team match	
12	Victory Road (2017)	September 28, 2017 (Note: The event was taped on August 20, 2017.)	Orlando, Florida	Impact Zone	Eli Drake (c) vs. Johnny Impact for the GFW Global Championship	
13	Victory Road (2019)	September 14, 2019	Enid, Oklahoma	Stride Bank Center	Michael Elgin vs. TJP	
14	Victory Road (2020)	October 3, 2020	Nashville, Tennessee	Skyway Studios	Eric Young vs. Eddie Edwards for the Impact World Championship	
15	Victory Road (2021)	September 18, 2021	Nashville, Tennessee	Skyway Studios	Christian Cage (c) vs. Ace Austin for the Impact World Championship	
16	Victory Road (2022)	September 23, 2022	Nashville, Tennessee	Skyway Studios	Moose vs. Sami Callihan vs. Steve Maclin in a Three-Way Barbed Wire Massacre match	
17	Victory Road (2023)	September 8, 2023	White Plains, New York	Westchester County Center	Josh Alexander vs. Steve Maclin	
18	Victory Road (2024)	September 13, 2024	San Antonio, Texas	Boeing Center at Tech Port	Nic Nemeth (c) vs. Moose for the TNA World Championship	
19	Victory Road (2025)	September 26, 2025	Edmonton, Alberta, Canada	Edmonton Expo Centre	Leon Slater (c) vs. Myron Reed for the TNA X Division Championship	
(c) – refers to the champion(s) heading into the match
