= Impact Wrestling Emergence (2022) =

2022 Impact Wrestling event

Emergence
- Promotional poster
- Promotion: Impact Wrestling
- Date: August 12, 2022
- City: Cicero, Illinois
- Venue: Cicero Stadium

Impact Plus Monthly Specials chronology
← Previous; Against All Odds	Next → Victory Road

Emergence chronology
← Previous; 2021	Next → 2023

The 2022 Emergence was a professional wrestling event produced by Impact Wrestling. It took place on August 12, 2022, at Cicero Stadium in Cicero, Illinois, and aired on Impact Plus and YouTube. It was the third event under the Emergence chronology. The event also featured wrestlers from partner promotions Lucha Libre AAA Worldwide (AAA) and New Japan Pro-Wrestling (NJPW).

Ten matches took place at the event, including two on the pre-show and one taped as a digital exclusive. In the main event, Josh Alexander defeated Alex Shelley to retain the Impact World Championship. In other prominent matches, Jordynne Grace defeated Mia Yim to retain the Impact Knockouts World Championship, Honor No More defeated Bullet Club in a no disqualification 10-man tag team match, Bandido defeated Rey Horus in the AAA Attraction match, and Mike Bailey defeated Jack Evans to retain the Impact X Division Championship in the opening bout.

== Production ==
=== Background ===
Emergence is a professional wrestling event produced by Impact Wrestling. The first event was held in 2020, and it is annually held during the month of August. On June 24, 2022, Impact Wrestling announced that Emergence would take place on August 12, 2022, at Cicero Stadium in the Chicago suburb of Cicero, Illinois.

=== Storylines ===
The event featured several professional wrestling matches that involved different wrestlers from pre-existing scripted feuds, plots, and storylines. Wrestlers portrayed heroes, villains, or less distinguishable characters in scripted events that build tension and culminate in a wrestling match or series of matches. Storylines were produced on Impact's weekly television program.

After the loss at Against All Odds and a severe reprimand from a returning Eric Young, Deaner and Joe Doering would spend the July 7 episode of Impact! on a rampage. They would beatdown Mike Bailey and Alan Angels after a match before fighting backstage with The Motor City Machine Guns and Josh Alexander, leading to a match the next week. On the July 14 episode of Impact!, The Motor City Machine Guns (Alex Shelley and Chris Sabin) and Impact World Champion Josh Alexander defeated Violent By Design (Eric Young, Deaner, and Joe Doering). After the match, Sabin would hold Alexander's title before handing it back to him, but not before keeping a grip on it for a short time; all the while, Shelley looked on interested. Later in the night, they would catch up with Impact Executive Vice President Scott D'Amore, talking about their new title aspirations. As such, D'Amore scheduled a number one contender's match between Shelley and Sabin for next week. On that night, Shelley defeated Sabin, earning him his first Impact World Championship match against Alexander at Emergence. After the match, Doering and Deaner would attack them until a debuting Kushida made the save. At the same time, Alexander attempted to make the save but was prevented by having a backstage altercation and brawl with Shera and Raj Singh. On the July 28 episode of Impact!, Alexander would defeat Shera with Singh. Before the match, Shelley interrupted Alexander reminding him to focus and prepare for their match. One week later, Shelly and Sabin would defeat Deaner and Doering. After the match, the Machine Guns would be beatdown by Violent by Design (joined by Young) despite the efforts of Kushida to help. Afterwards backstage, Alexander would advise Shelley to focus on their match instead of seeking revenge. Kushida would help Sabin at Emergence. Alexander would then be recruited by Eddie Edwards to join Honor No More, but he would rebuke the offer. The August 11 episode of Impact! would have a tense but respectful contract signing between Alexander and Shelley. Shelley would call Alexander a copycat of him while Alexander would question if Shelley had the mental toughness to win the big one.

On the July 7 episode of Impact!, Mia Yim defeated Deonna Purrazzo to become the number one contender to the Impact Knockouts World Championship, earning a title match against champion Jordynne Grace at Emergence. After the match, Grace would come to the ring to have a respectful faceoff with Yim. Two weeks later, VXT (Purrazzo and Chelsea Green) would defeat Grace and Yim after some miscommunication between Grace and Yim. The August 4 episode of Impact! would have Grace and Yim giving separate interviews about their title match. Yim would be interrupted by Madison Rayne who was annoyed at all the attention Yim has been receiving. Gail Kim would make a match between them. That match would take place the next week, with Yim defeating Rayne. Later backstage, Grace and Yim would have a respectful faceoff though they have tension over their loss in the tag match.

Honor No More would spend the July 7 episode of Impact! frustrated with their loss at Against All Odds, Bullet Club and Impact. Eddie Edwards in particular put blame on PCO and ordered him to prove himself in a match. PCO (with Vincent) would defeat Black Taurus (with Crazzy Steve). HNM would come out pleased with the result, until Heath appeared and sneak attacked Kenny King, causing more disarray for the group. An amused Bullet Club would watch this and issue a challenge. That challenge would take place on the July 14 episode of Impact! when Honor No More's Eddie Edwards, Kenny King, Matt Taven, and Mike Bennett defeated Bullet Club's Ace Austin, Chris Bey, and Impact World Tag Team Champions The Good Brothers (Doc Gallows and Karl Anderson); there, Taven would get the pinfall on Gallows. The following week, Honor No More complained about Heath and the lack of title matches members their stable had gotten and believed that beating one half of the champions would have secured a title match; but they were instead met with a tag team match against Austin and Bey, which Taven and Bennett lost after interference from Heath. On the July 28 episode of Impact!, after Edwards (with King) defeated Austin (with Bey), Honor No More demanded Scott D'Amore give them a title match, before attending a commotion involving Bennett being attacked by Heath. Later in the night, D'Amore confronted Honor No More outside as they were pulling wires from a production truck, causing technical difficulties with the broadcast. Fed up with their antics, D'Amore scheduled a ten-man tag team match between Honor No More (Edwards, Taven, Bennett, PCO, and Vincent) against Bullet Club (Austin, Bey, The Good Brothers, and Hikuleo); if Honor No More won, they would get their title match, but if Bullet Club won, Honor No More must permanently disband. The August 4 episode of Impact! would have promos from both groups feeling confident about their upcoming match. Edwards though would continue to be weary of PCO's commitment and wanting results, Vincent would vouch for PCO for his match. PCO would defeat Gallows in a Derby City Street Fight. A week later, Anderson would defeat King. After the match, King would attempt to injure Anderson with a chair, but he would be stopped by a sneak attack by Heath. Later in a backstage promo, HNM would talk about the serious consequences at Emergence with Edwards being happy with PCO and asking King to handle Heath.

On the July 21 episode of Impact!, as part of Impact Wrestling's partnership with Lucha Libre AAA Worldwide (AAA), a special attraction match between Bandido and Rey Horus was added to the Emergence card.

At Against All Odds, Moose defeated Sami Callihan in a Clockwork Orange House of Fun match due to interference from Steve Maclin for unknown reasons. On the July 7 episode of Impact!, James Storm would go to Moose's dressing room looking to settle his history with Moose. Instead he found Maclin, and after an argument a match was made for the next week. Maclin would defeat Storm in that match. After the match, Callihan would turn the lights off and attempt a sneak attack, but Maclin would evade that attack. Callihan would finally get his hands on Maclin during a backstage interview on the July 21 episode of Impact!, only for Moose to join Maclin in the brawl before Callihan escaped. Impact Moose would have an interview on the July 28 episode of Impact! where he would deny any alliance with Maclin. Later in the show, Raj Singh and Shera would be in the ring fuming about Shera's loss. Callihan would turn the lights off and appear to attack both of them before issuing threats of violence to Maclin and Moose. The following week, after Callihan defeated Raj Singh, he would again be jumped by Moose and Maclin. As a result of these events, Callihan and Maclin would face off in singles competition at Emergence. Later in the show in an interview, Maclin would again deny an alliance with Moose. Crazzy Steve would interrupt calling Maclin a liar leading to a match next week. On the August 11 episode of Before the Impact, Maclin would defeat Crazzy Steve.

On the July 7 episode of Impact!, Eric Young would make his return after his Slammiversary loss to ridicule and chastise Deaner and Joe Doering about their recent actions and losses. In response they would attack numerous members of the roster, leading to a match the next week with Josh Alexander and The Motor City Machine Guns. Alexander and the Machine Guns would defeat Violent By Design on the July 14 episode of Impact!. On the July 21 episode of Impact!, Deaner (with Doering) would lose an Impact X Division Championship match to Mike Bailey. A disappointed Young would demand Deaner and Doering to prove they belong with him. Violent By Design's Deaner and Joe Doering would attack both Alex Shelley and Chris Sabin after their world championship number one contender's match. Shelley and Sabin would soon be saved by the debuting Kushida, a former partner of Shelley's. Two weeks later on Impact!, The Motor City Machine Guns defeated Deaner and Doering, only for the latter to conduct a post-match attack once again. Kushida would come out to help but was piledriven by VBD's leader Eric Young. Later that night, it was announced that Sabin and Kushida will team up against Violent By Design at Emergence. On the August 11 episode of Impact!, Kushida (with Sabin) would defeat Deaner (with Doering). Later backstage, Young would continue to be disappointed by Deaner and Doering's failures. In response, he placed himself in the match at Emergence.

At Slammiversary, Jack Evans was originally supposed to take part in the Impact X Division Championship Ultimate X match, but an injury forced him to withdraw and saw him replaced with Andrew Everett. That night, Mike Bailey would become the new champion, outlasting Everett, Alex Zayne, Kenny King, Trey Miguel, and defending champion Ace Austin. After successfully defending his title at Against All Odds, Bailey would continue his run as champion by defeating Alan Angels on the July 7 episode of Impact!. After the match, Bailey and Angels would be attacked by Deaner and Joe Doering. A week later Bailey would issue a challenge to a title match to Deaner. That title match would take place on the July 21 episode of Impact!, with Bailey defeating Deaner (with Doering). On August 4, Impact announced that Evans will challenge for the X Division Championship at Emergence, still held by Bailey after defending the title against Rocky Romero on the August 11 episode of Impact!.

On the July 14 episode of Impact!, Rosemary and Taya Valkyrie would be reunited with Havok after a trip to the Undead Realm. To Rosemary's dismay, Havok had transformed from being dark and vicious to being Jessicka who is bubbly and positive like Taya. On the same episode, Chelsea Green would defeat Mickie James. VXT (Deonna Purrazzo and Green) would continue their momentum the next week when they defeated Jordynne Grace and Mia Yim. Later they would confront Gail Kim wanting to be added to the Impact Knockouts World Championship match. Kim would deny that request because they were receiving an Impact Knockouts World Tag Team Championship match against Rosemary and Valkyrie at Emergence instead. There would some tension backstage between the teams on the July 28 episode of Impact! leading to a singles match the week after. On that episode, Purrazzo would defeat Rosemary (with Valkyrie and Jessicka). During the match Purrazzo would cheap shot Jessicka, which led to her trying to interfere in the match. This backfired as it distracted Rosemary leading to a loss. Later in a backstage promo, Valkyrie would try to calm things down with Rosemary being frustrated with Jessicka's change of heart and the loss. It would be announced on this show that the match would take place on the Countdown to Emergence.

On the July 7 episode of Impact!, Brian Myers would be backstage gloating about his Impact Digital Media Championship victory at Against All Odds to Johnny Swinger, Zicky Dice and some backstage workers. Bhupinder Gujjar would approach Myers wanting a title shot. Myers would talk his way out of it by arranging a match for Gujjar with Swinger. That match would take place on the July 14 episode of Before the Impact, with Gujjar defeating Swinger (with Dice). Myers would have a successful title defense against Aiden Prince in a digital exclusive match. On the July 21 episode of Impact!, Gujjar would again approach Myers while he is bragging to backstage workers to ask for a title shot. Myers would talk his way out of it by alleging Vincent has issues with Gujjar and goes to arrange a match between them. That match would take place the next week on Before the Impact with Myers on commentary. Gujjar would defeat Vincent (with Maria Kanellis) after Heath caused a distraction. Later on Impact!, Gujjar would confront Myers for a title shot with Myers lying that someone else had the title shot. To his surprise Crazzy Steve would claim the shot for Black Taurus, with Scott D'Amore forcing Myers to take the match. On the August 4 episode of Impact!, Myers would defend his title when he defeated Taurus (with Steve) by cheating. After the match, Myers would try to flee the ring, but Gujjar would toss him back and with Decay would beat Myers down. A week later, Myers would brag to backstage workers about his victory. Gujjar would interrupt to issue a challenge and after mocking Myers for the post match beatdown, Myers accepts. Later in the show, it was announced that the match would take place on the Countdown to Emergence.

== Results ==
No.	Results	Stipulations	Times
1^{D}	Laredo Kid and Trey Miguel defeated Decay (Black Taurus and Crazzy Steve) by pinfall (Note: The match was taped for an Impact Digital Exclusive that aired on August 16.)	Tag team match	5:22
2^{P}	Brian Myers (c) defeated Bhupinder Gujjar by pinfall	Singles match for the Impact Digital Media Championship	7:21
3^{P}	VXT (Chelsea Green and Deonna Purrazzo) defeated Rosemary and Taya Valkyrie (c) (with Jessicka) by pinfall	Tag team match for the Impact Knockouts World Tag Team Championship	8:00
4	Mike Bailey (c) defeated Jack Evans by pinfall	Singles match for the Impact X Division Championship	12:38
5	Violent By Design (Eric Young and Deaner) (with Joe Doering) defeated Chris Sabin and Kushida by pinfall	Tag team match	12:42
6	Bandido defeated Rey Horus by pinfall	Singles match	12:56
7	Sami Callihan defeated Steve Maclin by pinfall	No disqualification match	11:21
8	Honor No More (Eddie Edwards, Matt Taven, Mike Bennett, PCO, and Vincent) (with Maria Kanellis) defeated Bullet Club (Ace Austin, Chris Bey, Doc Gallows, Karl Anderson, and Hikuleo) by pinfall	No disqualification 10-man tag team match Honor No More received a shot at the Impact World Tag Team Championship. Had Bullet Club won, Honor No More would have been forced to permanently disband.	15:48
9	Jordynne Grace (c) defeated Mia Yim by pinfall	Singles match for the Impact Knockouts World Championship	13:25
10	Josh Alexander (c) defeated Alex Shelley by pinfall	Singles match for the Impact World Championship	27:29
(c) / – the champion(s) heading into the match; D / – this was a dark match; P / – the match was broadcast on the pre-show
