= Victory Road (2004) =

2004 Total Nonstop Action Wrestling pay-per-view event

- Promotional poster featuring Jeff Jarrett, Monty Brown, A.J. Styles and Jeff Hardy
- Promotion: Total Nonstop Action Wrestling
- Date: November 7, 2004
- City: Orlando, Florida
- Venue: TNA Impact! Zone
- Attendance: 700
- Tagline: "A 3-Hour Epic Event!"

Pay-per-view chronology
← Previous; First	Next → Turning Point

Victory Road chronology
← Previous; First	Next → 2006

The 2004 Victory Road was a professional wrestling pay-per-view (PPV) event produced by Total Nonstop Action Wrestling (TNA), which took place on November 7, 2004, at the TNA Impact! Zone in Orlando, Florida. It was the first event under the Victory Road chronology, which became an annual event in 2006. Nine matches were featured on the event's card.

The main event was a Ladder match for the NWA World Heavyweight Championship, in which the champion, Jeff Jarrett, defeated the challenger, Jeff Hardy, by climbing a ladder and retrieving the championship. America's Most Wanted (Chris Harris and James Storm) defeated Triple X (Christopher Daniels and Elix Skipper) in another featured match contested under Elimination Last Team Standing rules. The event's undercard featured different varieties of matches. One match on the undercard was contested for the TNA X Division Championship, in which Petey Williams successfully defended it against A.J. Styles. Also a match that was held under no disqualification rules called a Monster's Ball match was won by Monty Brown by defeating Raven and Abyss.

The event is remembered as being TNA's first monthly three-hour PPV event. Before Victory Road, TNA only hosted weekly two-hour PPV events. The professional wrestling section of the Canadian Online Explorer website rated the entire event a 5 out of 10, lower than the 2006 event's rating of 5.5.

== Production ==
=== Background ===
The event featured nine professional wrestling matches that involved different wrestlers from pre-existing scripted feuds, plots, and storylines. Wrestlers were portrayed as either villains or heroes in the scripted events that built tension and culminated in a wrestling match or series of matches.

The main event at Victory Road was a Ladder match for the NWA World Heavyweight Championship between the champion, Jeff Jarrett, and the challenger, Jeff Hardy. In a Ladder match, two or more participants fight to climb a ladder to retrieve a contract, championship belt, or some other type of object to win. Jarrett was scripted to defend the championship against Hardy on the October 15 episode of TNA's primary television program, TNA Impact!, after Hardy won a tournament to become number one contender. Jarrett defeated Hardy to retain the championship once before, on September 6 at TNA's final weekly PPV, which set up the rivalry between the two. On the October 22 episode of Impact!, Hardy challenged Jarrett to contest their bout under Ladder match rules, which Jarrett accepted.

The highest promoted match, second only to the main event in importance, scheduled for Victory Road was between the tag team pairings of America's Most Wanted (Chris Harris and James Storm) (AMW) and Triple X (Christopher Daniels and Elix Skipper) (XXX), with them competing in an Elimination Last Team Standing match. In this match, the teams fought each other until both members of one team could not stand up before the referee counted to ten. The build up to this match began on the previous weekly PPV, when Storm was not cleared to wrestle so XXX took AMW's place in challenging for the NWA World Tag Team Championship. Daniels was injured early in the evening after a scripted assault by The Naturals (Andy Douglas and Chase Stevens). Harris was written into the plotline to replace Daniels in challenging and defeating The Naturals for the tag team championship at the PPV. On the September 24 episode of Impact!, Daniels and Storm were forced to team together and challenge Skipper and Harris for the championship, which they were successful in winning. Storm and Daniels later lost the championship to Team Canada (Bobby Roode and Eric Young) on the October 15 episode of Impact!. Harris and Storm then re-joined to continue as AMW, while Daniels and Skipper did the same as XXX. After a few brawls between the two teams on Impact!, AMW challenged XXX to a Last Team Standing match at Victory Road on the October 29 episode of Impact!.

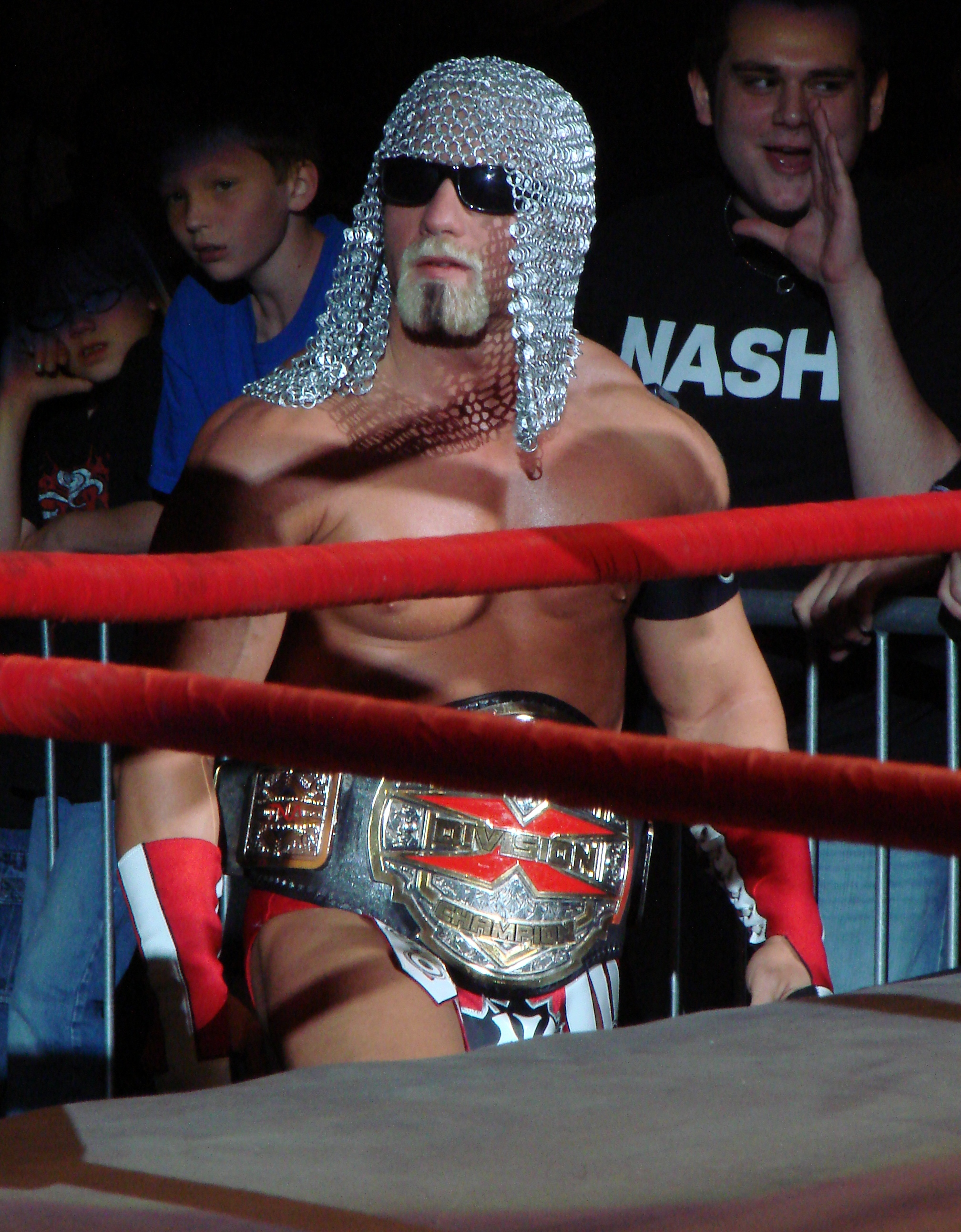
Petey Williams as TNA X Division Champion

In TNA's X Division, the TNA X Division Champion Petey Williams was scripted to defend the championship against A.J. Styles. The narrative plot assigned to their rivalry began when Williams assaulted Styles after he defeated Kid Kash in a Tables match on the previous weekly PPV. Williams and the alliance he was associated with at the time, Team Canada, repeatedly attacked Styles following the event on Impact!. Styles become the number one contender to the X Division Championship by winning a match involving six other men on the October 1 episode of Impact!, setting up a match between the two at Victory Road for the championship.

TNA held the first ever Monster's Ball match, featuring Monty Brown, Abyss, and Raven, at Victory Road. There were no disqualifications and pinfalls and submissions were counted anywhere in this match. Brown, Abyss, and Raven were all involved in a tournament to challenge Jarrett for the NWA World Heavyweight Championship at Victory Road which set up a rivalry between the three. On the October 29 episode of Impact!, Raven challenged Brown and Abyss to a Monsters Ball match at Victory Road, which was later booked for the event without Brown nor Abyss accepting the challenge.

The TNA Director of Authority (DOA) was voted on at Victory Road. The candidates were the current DOA, Vince Russo, and Dusty Rhodes. After weeks of arguing between the two over how TNA should be run, Russo stated on the October 15 episode of Impact! that the fans would decide at Victory Road, per an online vote held on TNA's official website.

== Event ==
Other on-screen personnel
Commentator	Mike Tenay
Commentator	Don West
Ring announcer	Jeremy Borash
Referee	Rudy Charles
Referee	Mark "Slick" Johnson
Referee	Andrew Thomas
Interviewers	Scott Hudson
Interviewers	Shane Douglas

=== Preliminary matches ===
The first match at Victory Road to air live on PPV was a twenty-man Gauntlet match, consisting of wrestlers who compete in TNA's X Division. In this particular match, wrestlers were eliminated by being thrown over the top rope and down to the floor until there were two left in the ring. Those two men had a standard match until one was pinned or made to submit. The final two participants were Kazarian and Héctor Garza. Kazarian tried to pin Garza with a Cradle, but Garza countered the maneuver with a roll-up for the win.

The second match was an Eight Man Tag Team match consisting of the team of Ron Killings, Erik Watts, Johnny B. Badd and Pat Kenney against the team of Kid Kash, Dallas, and The Naturals (Andy Douglas and Chase Stevens). After various offensive maneuvers between the two teams, Killings pinned Stevens after a double underhook DDT.

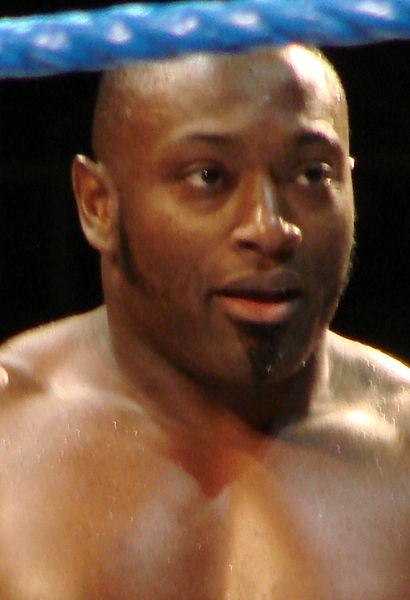
Monty Brown won the first-ever Monster's Ball match at Victory Road.

The third match was a lucha libre midget match between Mascarita Sagrada and Piratita Morgan. Sagrada won the match when he pinned Morgan with a small package.

A Tag Team match for the NWA World Tag Team Championship between the champions, Team Canada (Bobby Roode and Eric Young), and the 3 Live Kru (B.G. James and Konnan) (3LK) followed. The match went back and forth between the two teams with each taking advantage of the pace multiple times. The 3LK won the match and the championship by pinfall after Konnan lifted Roode up in the air, sitdown, and forced Roode's face into the mat.

Trinity, who was accompanied by The New York Connection (NYC) pairing of Johnny Swinger and Glenn Gilberti, fought an unknown opponent in an open challenge by Trinity in the fifth bout. Jacqueline Moore made her TNA debut and answered the challenge. During the match, NYC interfered on Trinity's behalf by distracting Moore to allow Trinity to perform the Fall from Grace from the top rope to gain the pinfall victory.

TNA hosted the first ever Monster's Ball match, involving Monty Brown, Abyss, and Raven. Throughout the match, the competitors used many different types of weapons, such as thumbtacks, chairs, and tables. Brown became the victor by pinning Raven after a Pounce.

=== Main event matches ===
Petey Williams, who was accompanied by Coach D'Amore, defended the TNA X Division Championship against A.J. Styles in the following bout. Williams retained the championship in the match by jumping off of the top rope and landing on his feet with Styles' head between his legs, connecting with the Canadian Destroyer. Williams followed by pinning Styles to win the encounter.

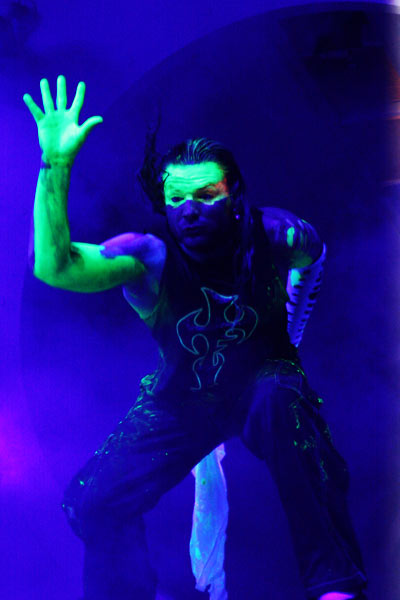
Jeff Hardy fought for the NWA World Heavyweight Championship against Jeff Jarrett in a Ladder match at Victory Road.

America's Most Wanted (Chris Harris and James Storm) (AMW) fought Triple X (Christopher Daniels and Elix Skipper) (XXX) in an Elimination Last Team Standing match in the next encounter. Though the match was billed as a Last Team Standing match, it was held under Texas Death match rules. A Texas Death match is similar to a Last Team Standing match, however, the competitor must pin or make his opponent submit before the referee begins his count. Daniels pinned Storm following hitting him in the knee with a steel chair to begin the ten count, which Storm failed to make. Daniels was the second to be eliminated, failing to reach the ten count after being pinned following a top rope legdrop by Harris. With the outcome of the match down to the competition between Harris and Skipper, Harris hit Skipper with the Catatonic onto a steel chair. Harris then pinned Skipper to begin the ten count; Skipper did not get to his feet, giving the win to AMW.

The poll results were announced for the Director of Authority between Dusty Rhodes and Vince Russo. Rhodes won the position over Russo with 55.6% of the popular vote.

The main event was a Ladder match for the NWA World Heavyweight Championship, involving the champion, Jeff Jarrett, and the challenger, Jeff Hardy. Scott Hall interfered with the match by hitting Hardy with the Outsider's Edge. While Hardy and Jarrett were both at the top of a ladder trying to grab the belt, Kevin Nash, an ally of Hardy's, entered the arena with two guitars over both of his shoulders and handed a guitar to Hall. The two men then began to bash Hardy with the guitars until Jarrett broke a guitar over Hardy's head. Jarrett then retrieved the championship belt from the holder above the ring to win the match. Following the match, Jarrett, Nash, and Hall challenged the TNA roster to fight them. A.J. Styles and the 3Live Kru (Ron Killings, B.G. James, and Konnan) answered their challenge, but failed to win the fight. The video feed changed from the ring to a black limousine outside of the venue that showed a man in a black coat step out and walk into the arena. Randy Savage then made his debut in the company and walked to ringside as the event came to a close.

== Aftermath ==
Following the event on the November 19 episode of Impact!, Randy Savage, Jeff Hardy, and A.J. Styles challenged the newly dubbed Kings of Wrestling (Jeff Jarrett, Kevin Nash, and Scott Hall) to a Six Man Tag Team match at TNA's next and December PPV event, Turning Point. Savage, Hardy, and Styles won the match at Turning Point.

America's Most Wanted (Chris Harris and James Storm) (AMW) and Triple X (Christopher Daniels and Elix Skipper) (XXX) continued their rivalry at Turning Point in a match that was contested inside a 16-foot (4.9 m) high steel structure with six sides known as a Six Sides of Steel. The match was announced on the November 19 episode of Impact! with the added stipulation that the losing team would have to disband forever. AMW won the match and as a result XXX had to disband.

After winning the NWA World Tag Team Championship, The 3Live Kru (B.G. James and Konnan) fought Team Canada (Bobby Roode and Eric Young) once again at Turning Point, however, Team Canada defeated The 3Live Kru to win the championship.

== Reception ==
The Canadian Online Explorer's writer Jason Clevett rated the entire event 5 out of 10, which was lower than the 2006 event's rating of 5.5 out of 10. The Elimination Last Team Standing match was rated a 0 out of 10, while the main event match for the NWA World Heavyweight Championship was rated a 5 out of 10. Clevett stated in his review of the event that he thought the Elimination Last Team Standing match was "horrible". He also felt that the NWA Championship match was a "sloppy ladder match". TNA later released a DVD counting down the top 50 moments in their history, with Victory Road being ranked number 25. The debut of Scott Hall, Kevin Nash, and Randy Savage were ranked higher than the event itself, with that moment ranking in at number 19. The event was released on DVD on September 20, 2005, by TNA Home Video in a boxset which also included TNA's April 2005 PPV event, Lockdown, and the 2004 Turning Point event; the boxset was called the "TNA Anthology: The Epic Set"

== Results ==
No.	Results	Stipulations	Times
1	Héctor Garza won by last eliminating Kazarian	20-man X-Division Gauntlet match for the X Division Cup	26:25
2	Ron Killings, Erik Watts, Johnny B. Badd and Pat Kenney defeated The Naturals (Andy Douglas and Chase Stevens), Kid Kash and Dallas	Eight-man tag team match	4:37
3	Mascarita Sagrada defeated Piratita Morgan	Singles match	2:58
4	3 Live Kru (B.G. James and Konnan) defeated Team Canada (Eric Young and Bobby Roode) (c)	Tag team match for the NWA World Tag Team Championship	6:57
5	Stephanie Trinity (with Johnny Swinger and Glenn Gilberti) defeated Jacqueline	Singles match	1:50
6	Monty Brown defeated Raven and Abyss	Monster's Ball match	9:05
7	Petey Williams (c) defeated A.J. Styles	Singles match for the TNA X Division Championship	9:48
8	America's Most Wanted (James Storm and Chris Harris) defeated Triple X (Christopher Daniels and Elix Skipper)	Elimination Last Team Standing match	11:31
9	Jeff Jarrett (c) defeated Jeff Hardy	Ladder match for the NWA World Heavyweight Championship	18:37
(c) / – the champion(s) heading into the match

=== Tournament bracket ===
The tournament to crown the #1 contender for the NWA World Heavyweight Championship was held in October 2004.

Semifinals
1	Raven	11:43
4	Monty Brown	Pin
3	Abyss	8:08
2	Jeff Hardy	Pin

Final
Monty Brown	Pin
Jeff Hardy	9:16

=== Gauntlet entrances and eliminations ===
Entrant		Eliminated by		Time
1	Kazarian	19	Garza	26:25
2	Sonjay Dutt	4	Shelley	10:15
3	Puma	1	Shane and Kazarian	05:59
4	L.A. Park	5	Kazarian	10:23
5	Jerrelle Clark	2	Shane and Kazarian	6:05
6	Miyamoto	3	Shane and Kazarian	6:12
7	Michael Shane	13	Spanky	20:29
8	Héctor Garza	–	Winner	26:25
9	Nosawa	6	Siaki	12:18
10	Mikey Batts	7	Garza	12:43
11	Alex Shelley	11	Cross	17:32
12	Matt Sydal	8	Shelley	14:55
13	Sonny Siaki	12	Sabin and Spanky	20:04
14	Jason Cross	14	Psicosis	21:43
15	Shark Boy	9	Siaki	16:48
16	Psicosis	15	Amazing Red	22:09
17	D-Ray 3000	10	Siaki	16:49
18	Amazing Red	16	Kazarian	22:22
19	Spanky	17	Sabin	22:33
20	Chris Sabin	18	Garza	23:46

=== Elimination Last Team Standing match ===
Elimination	Wrestler	Eliminated by	Elimination move	Time
1	James Storm	Christopher Daniels	Steel chair to the injured knee	6:28
2	Christopher Daniels	Chris Harris	Top rope leg drop	7:56
3	Elix Skipper	Chris Harris	Catatonic onto a steel chair	11:31
Winners:	America's Most Wanted (Chris Harris & James Storm)			
