= Victory Road (2017) =

- Promotion: Impact Wrestling
- Date: August 20, 2017 (aired on September 28, 2017)
- City: Orlando, Florida
- Venue: Impact Zone

Victory Road chronology
← Previous; 2012	Next → 2019

Impact! special episodes chronology
← Previous; Destination X	Next → Genesis

The 2017 Victory Road (aka Impact!: Victory Road) was a special episode of Impact Wrestling and the tenth edition of Victory Road professional wrestling event produced by the Impact Wrestling promotion, which took place on August 20, 2017 at the Impact Zone in Orlando, Florida and aired on television on September 28, 2017.

Four matches were contested at the event including three championship matches. In the main event, Eli Drake defeated Johnny Impact to retain the Global Championship. On the undercard, Trevor Lee successfully defended the X Division Championship against Petey Williams and oVe (Dave Crist and Jake Crist) defeated The Latin American Xchange (Santana and Ortiz) to capture the World Tag Team Championship.

== Production ==
=== Background ===
In 2004, Impact Wrestling (then known as Total Nonstop Action Wrestling) introduced its new weekly television program IMPACT!, which led to it stopping running weekly pay-per-view events and began producing monthly pay-per-view events with Victory Road as its first pay-per-view event. Victory Road would be held as a monthly pay-per-view event by TNA until 2012. In 2013, TNA discontinued most of its monthly pay-per-view events in favor of the new pre-taped One Night Only pay-per-view events.

=== Storylines ===
The event featured wrestlers from pre-existing scripted feuds and storylines. Wrestlers portrayed villains, heroes, or less distinguishable characters in the scripted events that built tension and culminated in a wrestling match or series of matches. Storylines between the characters played out on Impact Wrestling and Xplosion.

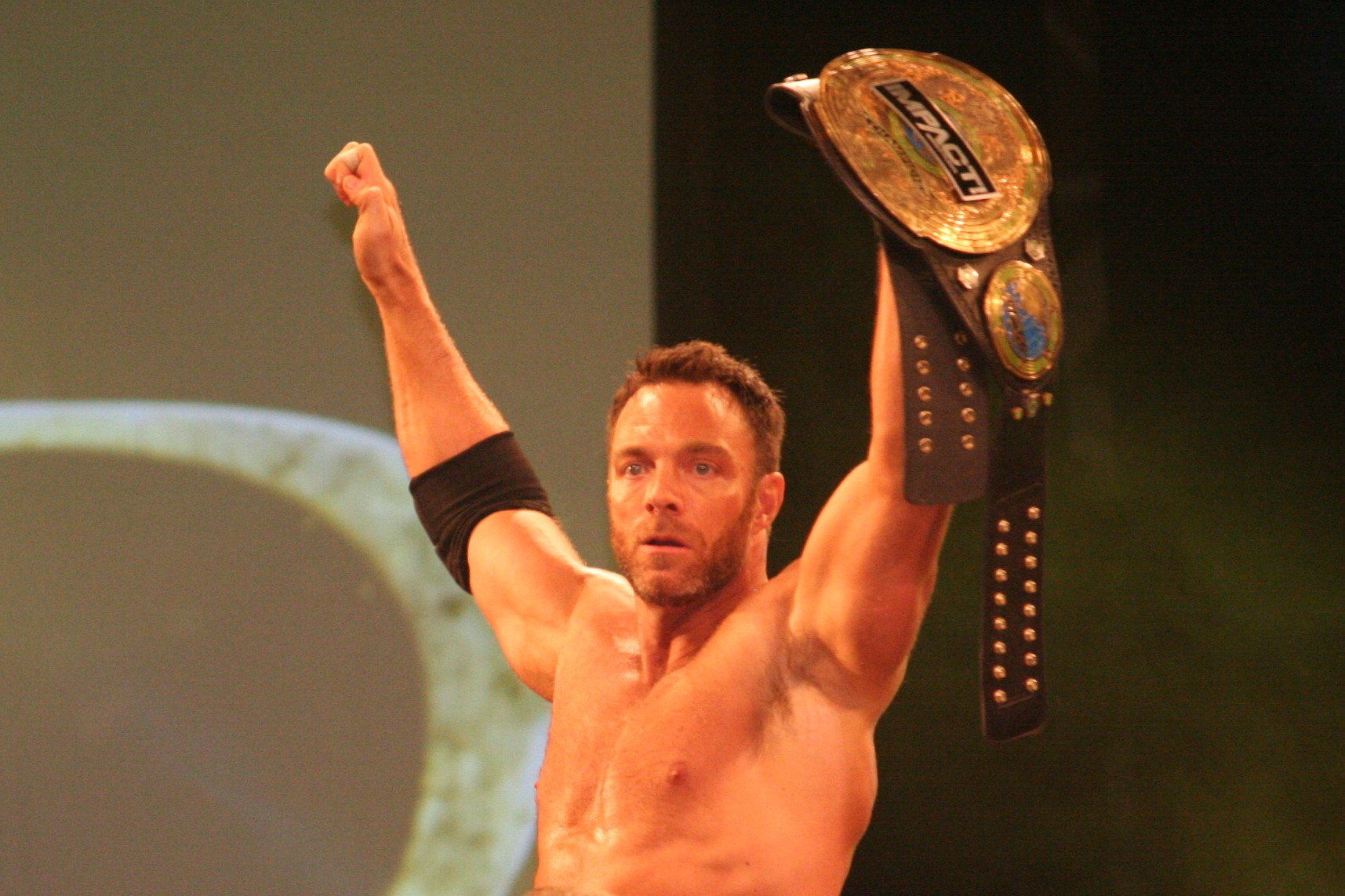
Eli Drake was the defending GFW Global Champion heading into the event.

On the August 24 episode of Impact Wrestling, Eli Drake won a Gauntlet for the Gold by last eliminating Eddie Edwards to win the vacant GFW Global Championship. The following week, on Impact Wrestling, Johnny Impact challenged Drake for the title but Edwards demanded a shot as well for being the runner-up in the match, which led to Jim Cornette making a tag team match featuring Drake and Chris Adonis against Impact and Edwards, where if Impact or Edwards scored the pinfall then that person would become the #1 contender for the title but Drake and Adonis won the match. On the September 14 episode of Impact Wrestling, Impact defeated Low Ki to become the #1 contender for the Global Championship at Victory Road special and was attacked by Drake and Adonis after the match. The following week, Impact demanded a title shot against Drake but Drake was competing for Lucha Libre AAA Worldwide in Mexico, so Impact successfully defended his #1 contender spot against KM and Texano, Jr. in consecutive matches.

Petey Williams made his return to GFW by helping Sonjay Dutt retain the X Division Championship against Trevor Lee in a ladder match at Destination X. On the August 31 episode of Impact Wrestling, Williams defeated Lee's ally Caleb Konley in his re-debut. On the September 7 episode of Impact Wrestling, Dutt and Williams defeated Lee and Konley in a tag team match. On the September 14 Impact Wrestling, Lee defeated Dutt in a falls count anywhere match to win the X Division Championship. On the September 21 Impact Wrestling, it was announced that Lee would defend the title against Williams at Victory Road.

On the September 7 episode of Impact Wrestling, oVe challenged The Latin American Xchange to a match for the World Tag Team Championship and Konnan accepted the challenge on the grounds that the title match would take place in the Mexican promotion The Crash. LAX retained the tag titles against oVe and two other teams from Crash in a four-way match. On the September 21 episode of Impact Wrestling, oVe confronted LAX for not giving them a fair title shot and insulted them, which led to LAX accepting their challenge to a match for the tag team titles at Victory Road.

At Destination X, Taryn Terrell made her surprise return to GFW by helping Sienna in defeating Gail Kim to win the Knockouts Championship. This led to Allie confronting Terrell on the August 31 Impact Wrestling and Terrell attacking her. On the September 7 Impact Wrestling, Sienna and Terrell defeated Kim and Allie in a tag team match and then Rosemary tried to save them from a post-match assault but Taya Valkyrie made her GFW debut and joined Sienna and Terrell in attacking the three. On the September 21 episode of Impact Wrestling, Karen Jarrett made a six-knockouts tag team match pitting Sienna, Terrell and Valkyrie against Allie, Kim and Rosemary at Victory Road.

== Event ==
=== Preliminary matches ===
The opening match of the event was a X Division Championship match between Trevor Lee and Petey Williams. Williams had executed a Canadian Destroyer on Lee and covered him for the pinfall but Caleb Konley pulled the referee out of the ring, allowing Lee to hit Williams with the title belt. Near the end of the match, Lee performed a leaping double foot stomp on Williams to retain the title.

Next, Allie, Gail Kim and Rosemary took on the team of Sienna, Taryn Terrell and Taya Valkyrie in a six-woman tag team match. After a back and forth action, Sienna pinned Allie with a roll-up by using the ropes for leverage for the win.

James Storm cut a promo confronting El Hijo del Fantasma and Texano on the grounds that people from other promotions were trying to leapfrog him, which led to the two attacking him until EC3 made the save. This would lead to Jim Cornette making a tag team match between the two teams for the October 5 episode of Impact Wrestling.

Next, The Latin American Xchange (Santana and Ortiz) defended the World Tag Team Championship against oVe (Dave Crist and Jake Crist). At the climax of the match, Dave nailed a Square and Compass DDT to Ortiz to win the match and the tag team titles.

=== Main event match ===
The main event featured Eli Drake defending the Global Championship against Johnny Impact. Drake knocked out the original referee by attacking him, which led to Drake and Chris Adonis double teaming Impact. Drake tried to hit Impact with the title belt but Impact ducked and Adonis was hit instead. Near the end of the match, Impact had climbed the top rope but Drake pushed the new referee and low blowed Impact and delivered a Gravy Train to Impact to retain the title. After the match, Drake and Adonis attacked Impact and Garza Jr. made the save, only to be attacked by the LAX.

== Reception ==
The Victory Road received a rating of 0.06 with the viewership number of 264,000, which was down from the previous week's September 21 episode of Impact, which had a rating of 0.05 and the viewership number of 277,000.

Victory Road received mixed reviews. John Moore of Pro Wrestling Dot Net considered it to be "old/bad TNA. We got ref bumps, ejects, undoing of the ejections, run-ins, run-ins by people who shouldn’t be running in, authority figures, Chris Masters, and other stuff that I haven’t mentioned because it was just too much contrived details to make sense." However, he appreciated all of the matches as he wrote "Williams vs. Lee match was nice. The Women’s trios match was extremely enjoyable. LAX vs. OVE was very fun. So, the in-ring stuff was solid."

Larry Csonka of 411Mania rated the event 6.7 as he considered that Victory Road "had a ton of potential, but for various reasons, the company just has an issue putting on a complete show. They continue to do some things well. They have good ideas, but they just aren’t coming together at the right time. The show continues to be really solid, there was nothing bad."

== Aftermath ==
Several rivalries from Victory Road continued after the event. Johnny Impact defeated Garza Jr. on the October 12 episode of Impact Wrestling to earn another Global Championship title shot against Eli Drake at Bound for Glory, where Drake once again retained the title due to interference by Alberto El Patron.

The feud between the six knockouts continued as Sienna would be scheduled to defend the Knockouts Championship against Taryn Terrell, Allie and Gail Kim in a four-way match at Bound for Glory. However, Terrell left the promotion and Kim defeated Sienna and Allie in a three-way match for the Knockouts Championship at Bound for Glory.

oVe and LAX continued their rivalry as oVe defended the World Tag Team Championship against LAX in a 5150 Street Fight at Bound for Glory, where oVe retained the titles due to interference by the debuting Sami Callihan.

James Storm and EC3 faced Fantasma and Texano in a tag team match on the October 5 episode of Impact Wrestling, where Fantasma and Texano won due to assistance by Pagano. On the October 19 episode of Impact Wrestling, Eddie Edwards joined Storm and EC3 to represent Impact Wrestling in their feud against the AAA representatives Fantasma, Texano and Pagano, which led to Team Impact defeating Team AAA in an interpromotional six-man tag team match at Bound for Glory.

Trevor Lee and Petey Williams continued their feud over the X Division Championship after Victory Road. At Bound for Glory, Lee retained the title against Williams, Matt Sydal, Sonjay Dutt, Dezmond Xavier and Garza Jr. in a six-way match.

== Results ==
No.	Results	Stipulations	Times
1	Trevor Lee (c) (with Caleb Konley) defeated Petey Williams	Singles match for the GFW X Division Championship	08:17
2	Sienna, Taryn Terrell and Taya Valkyrie defeated Allie, Gail Kim and Rosemary	Six-Knockouts tag team match	09:31
3	Ohio Versus Everything (Dave Crist and Jake Crist) defeated The Latin American Xchange (Santana and Ortiz) (c) (with Konnan and Diamante)	Tag team match for the GFW World Tag Team Championship	12:04
4	Eli Drake (c) defeated Johnny Impact	Singles match for the GFW Global Championship	25:27
(c) / – the champion(s) heading into the match
