= Victory Road (2019) =

2019 professional wrestling event

- Promotional poster featuring various Impact wrestlers
- Promotion(s): Impact Wrestling; World Class Revolution
- Date: September 14, 2019
- City: Enid, Oklahoma
- Venue: Stride Bank Center

Impact Plus Monthly Specials chronology
← Previous; Unbreakable	Next → Prelude to Glory

Victory Road chronology
← Previous; 2017	Next → 2020

Victory Road (2019) was a professional wrestling event produced by Impact Wrestling, in conjunction with World Class Revolution. The event was held at the Stride Bank Center in Enid, Oklahoma on September 14, 2019 and aired live on Impact Plus. It was the 11th event under the Victory Road chronology.

Nine professional wrestling matches were contested at the event. In the main event, Michael Elgin defeated TJP. In other prominent matches on the undercard, Taya Valkyrie successfully defended the Knockouts Championship against Rosemary, Moose defeated former mixed martial artist Stephan Bonnar, MVP defeated Chavo Guerrero Jr. to capture the WCR Heavyweight Championship and Brian Cage and Eddie Edwards defeated Desi Hit Squad members Mahabali Shera and Rohit Raju in a tag team match.

== Production ==
=== Background ===
In 2004, Impact Wrestling (then known as Total Nonstop Action Wrestling) discontinued weekly pay-per-view events after the introduction of its television show Impact! and held its first monthly pay-per-view, Victory Road, that November. Victory Road continued to be a regular monthly pay-per-view event for TNA until 2012, when the promotion discontinued most of its monthly pay-per-views in 2013 in favor of the new pre-recorded One Night Only events. Victory Road would be revived as a "One Night Only" event in 2014, and a special edition of Impact's weekly television series in 2017.

On August 8, 2019, Impact Wrestling announced on its website that Victory Road would return as a monthly special, exclusively to be streamed on Impact Plus. The event would be held in conjunction with independent promotion World Class Revolution (WCR) and would take place on September 14 at the Stride Bank Center, which was confirmed on the venue's official website.

=== Storylines ===
On September 13, Impact Wrestling and World Class Revolution held a special televised event called "Operation Override", where Chavo Guerrero Jr. defended the WCR Heavyweight Championship against MVP but retained the title via disqualification. This led to a rematch between Guerrero and MVP for the WCR title at Victory Road.

At Slammiversary XVII, Taya Valkyrie successfully defended the Knockouts Championship against Havok, Rosemary and Su Yung in a Monster's Ball match. A title defense for Valkyrie against Rosemary was later announced for Victory Road.

In the summer of 2019, Moose began targeting mixed martial artist Ken Shamrock by insulting the latter in his promos, which sparked a rivalry between Moose and Shamrock. A warm-up match for Moose was announced as he was scheduled to take on former mixed martial artist Stephan Bonnar at Victory Road. Moose and Bonnar had previously teamed to take on Bobby Lashley and King Mo in a losing effort at the 2017 Bound for Glory.

== Event ==
=== Preliminary matches ===
In the opening match, The North (Ethan Page and Josh Alexander) were scheduled to take on Rich Swann and Fuego Del Sol in a tag team contest but Swann was replaced by Retro Randy. North executed a double spinebuster in the end for the win.

Next, Kiera Hogan took on Desi Derata. Near the end of the match, Derata attempted to hit a spinning slam on Hogan but Hogan blinded her with a powder and left the ring with Derata chasing her outside the ring where Hogan superkicked Derata and went back to the ring while Derata lost by count-out.

Next, Sami Callihan took on Hawk. After a back and forth match, Callihan nailed a Cactus Special to Hawk for the win.

Next, Chavo Guerrero Jr. defended the WCR Heavyweight Championship against MVP. Near the end of the match, Guerrero attempted to execute a frog splash but MVP raised his knees to block the move and nailed a running boot on Guerrero to defeat him to win the WCR Heavyweight Championship.

Next, Taya Valkyrie defended the Impact Knockouts Championship against Rosemary. Valkyrie tried to goad Rosemary into walking out of the match but Rosemary refused and attacked her to begin the match. Near the end of the match, Valkyrie blinded Rosemary with a hairspray and nailed a Curb Stomp for the win.

Next, Moose took on Stephan Bonnar. Near the end of the match, Bonnar applied an armbar on Moose but Moose caught the ropes, forcing Bonnar to break the hold and then Moose rolled him up into an inside cradle and used the ropes for leverage to win the match.

The penultimate match of the event was scheduled to be Eddie Edwards against Rohit Raju. Raju was disqualified when Mahabali Shera attacked Edwards and then Brian Cage made the save for Edwards, making it a tag team match pitting Cage and Edwards against Shera and Raju. Cage nailed a F5 on Raju, allowing Edwards to hit a Boston Knee Party on Raju for the win.

=== Main event match ===
In the main event, TJP took on Michael Elgin. Near the end of the match, Elgin gained control by taking out TJP with two lariats and then nailed a turnbuckle powerbomb and an Elgin Bomb for the win.

== Results ==
No.	Results	Stipulations	Times
1	The North (Ethan Page and Josh Alexander) defeated Fuego Del Sol and Retro Randy	Tag team match	13:44
2	Kiera Hogan defeated Desi Derata	Singles match	08:30
3	Sami Callihan defeated Hawk	Singles match	09:02
4	MVP defeated Chavo Guerrero Jr. (c)	Singles match for the WCR Heavyweight Championship	13:42
5	Taya Valkyrie (c) defeated Rosemary	Singles match for the Impact Knockouts Championship	08:04
6	Moose defeated Stephan Bonnar	Singles match	10:03
7	Eddie Edwards defeated Rohit Raju (with Mahabali Shera) by disqualification	Singles match	03:26
8	Brian Cage and Eddie Edwards defeated Mahabali Shera and Rohit Raju	Tag team match	06:34
9	Michael Elgin defeated TJP	Singles match	17:06
(c) / – the champion(s) heading into the match
