= TNA Sacrifice (2026) =

Professional wrestling event

Sacrifice
- Promotion: Total Nonstop Action Wrestling
- Date: March 27, 2026
- City: Westwego, Louisiana
- Venue: Alario Center
- Attendance: 1,341

TNA+ Monthly Specials chronology
← Previous; No Surrender	Next → —

Sacrifice chronology
← Previous; 2025	Next → —

The 2026 Sacrifice was a professional wrestling event produced by Total Nonstop Action Wrestling. It took place on March 27, 2026, at the Alario Center in Westwego, Louisiana, and aired on TNA+. It was the 17th event under the Sacrifice chronology. Wrestlers from WWE's NXT brand, with which TNA has a partnership, also appeared at the event.

Ten matches were contested at the event, including two on the Countdown to Sacrifice pre-show. In the main event, Mike Santana and Steve Maclin for the TNA World Championship ended in a no contest, as Maclin was unable to compete after getting legitimately knocked out. In other prominent matches, Mara Sadé defeated Elayna Black in a No Disqualification match, NXT's Arianna Grace retained the TNA Knockouts World Championship in a triple threat match against Léi Yǐng Lee and Dani Luna, and in the opening bout, Leon Slater defeated Eric Young to retain the TNA X Division Championship. The event also featured Ricky Sosa officially signing with TNA and the returns of Havok and Taryn Terrell.

== Production ==
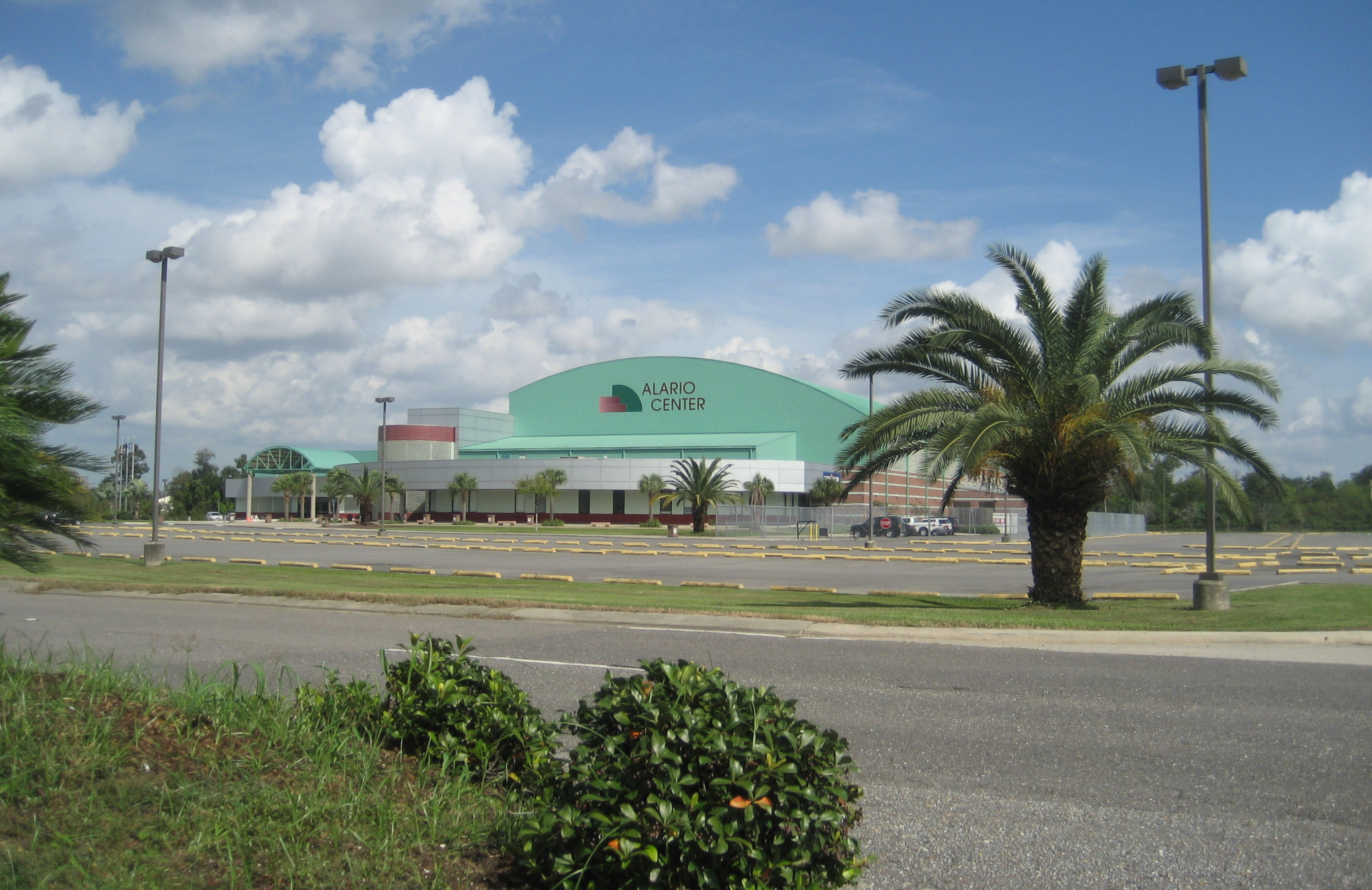
The event will be held at the Alario Center in Westwego, Louisiana.

=== Background ===
Sacrifice is an annual professional wrestling pay-per-view (PPV) event produced by Total Nonstop Action Wrestling that was first held in August 2005. The promotion's PPV schedule was reduced to four quarterly events in 2013, dropping Sacrifice. The event would return in 2014 and 2016, the latter as a special edition of Impact!. The event would be revived in 2020 as a monthly special for Impact Plus.

On January 15, 2026, TNA announced that Sacrifice will take place on March 27 at the Alario Center in Westwego, Louisiana.

=== Storylines ===
The event featured professional wrestling matches with results predetermined by TNA. Storylines were produced on the company's weekly program, Thursday Night Impact!.

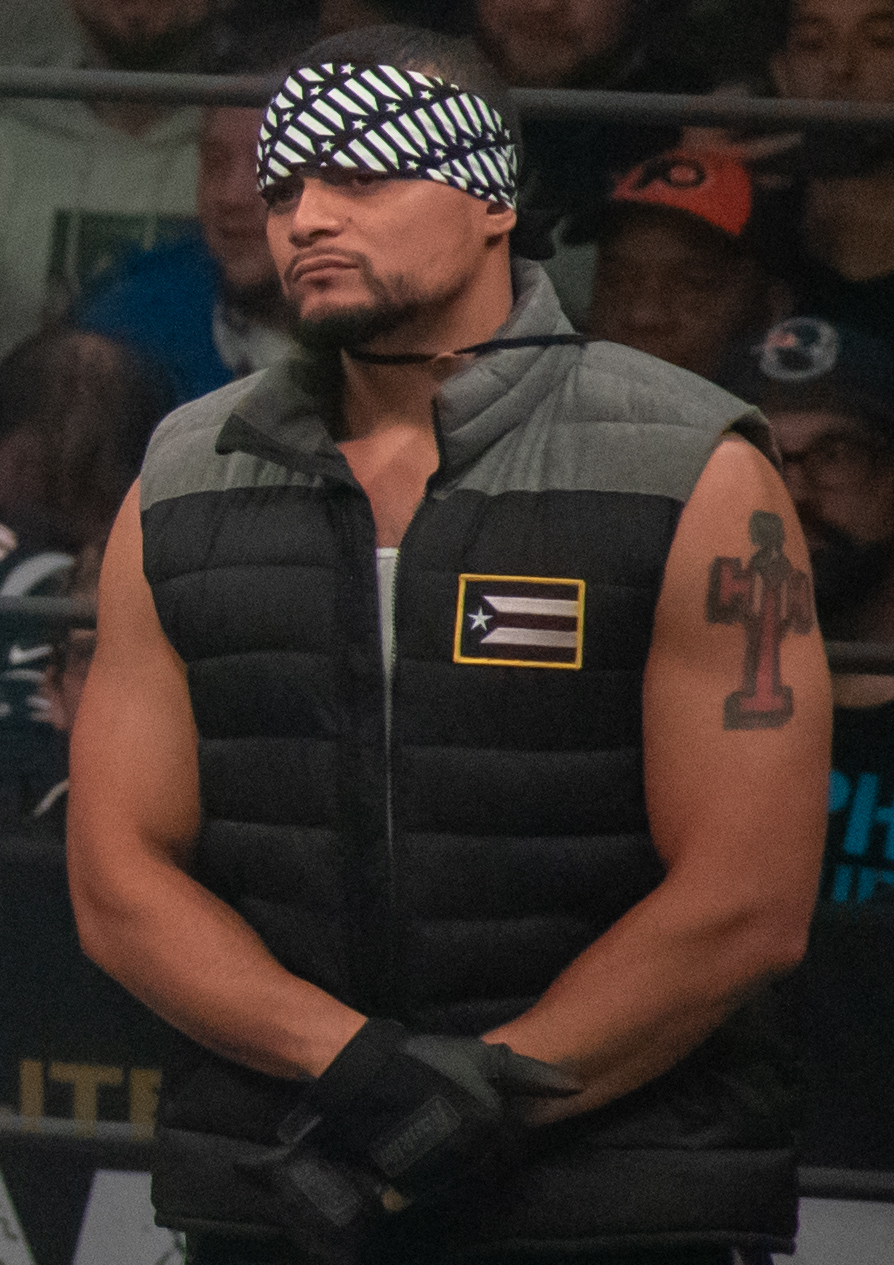
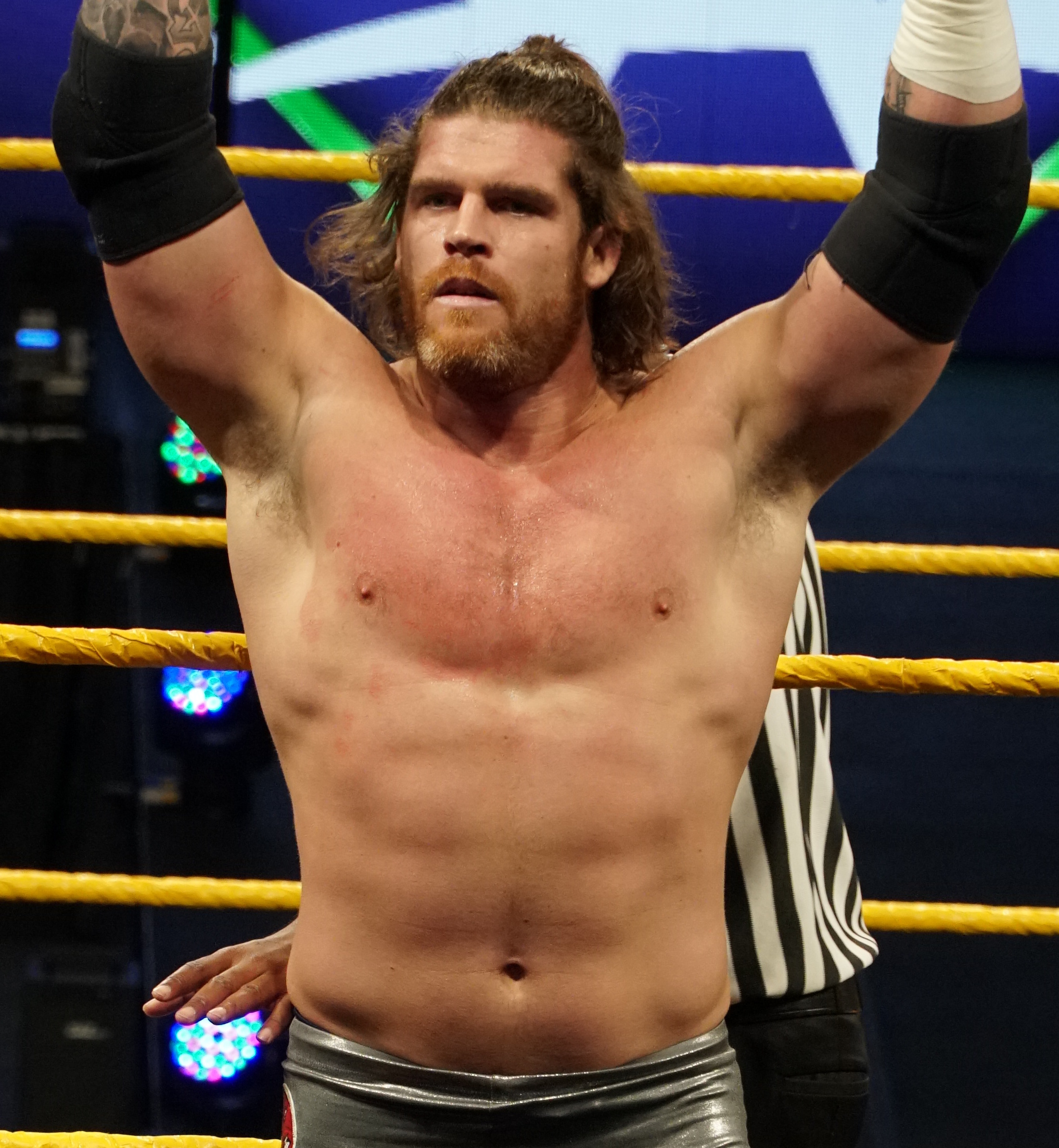
Reigning champion Mike Santana defended the TNA World Championship against Steve Maclin. Maclin received the title shot shortly after getting reinstated from getting (kayfabe) fired by his Feast or Fired briefcase.

At Turning Point on November 14, 2025, Steve Maclin and Mike Santana wrestled Frankie Kazarian and Nic Nemeth in a tag team match where Maclin spent the majority of the time competing solo as Santana was missing throughout the night. At the TNA Impact! premiere on AMC on January 15, 2026, Santana defeated Kazarian to win the TNA World Championship. On the January 22 episode of Thursday Night Impact!, Maclin competed in the Feast or Fired match, where he secured Briefcase No. 2. The following week's episode revealed that Maclin's briefcase contained the "Fired" message, forcing him to (kayfabe) leave TNA. As Maclin spoke his final words before leaving TNA, Santana came to wish him good luck on his way out, which prompted Maclin to attack Santana until security stopped him and threw him out of the building. TNA commentator Tom Hannifan brought out Maclin on the February 26 episode to allow him to explain why he attacked Santana. Maclin explained that he was mad that Santana was missing at Turning Point until the last few minutes of their match. Hannifan asked Maclin if he would accept responsibility for his actions, which led to Maclin attacking Hannifan. Santana ran to save Hannifan and Maclin left. Maclin hit TNA commentator Matthew Rehwoldt on his way out. On the March 5 episode, Santana demanded Maclin be officially reinstated, which TNA Director of Operations Daria Rae granted before TNA Director of Authority Santino Marella announced that Santana would defend his title against Maclin at Sacrifice.

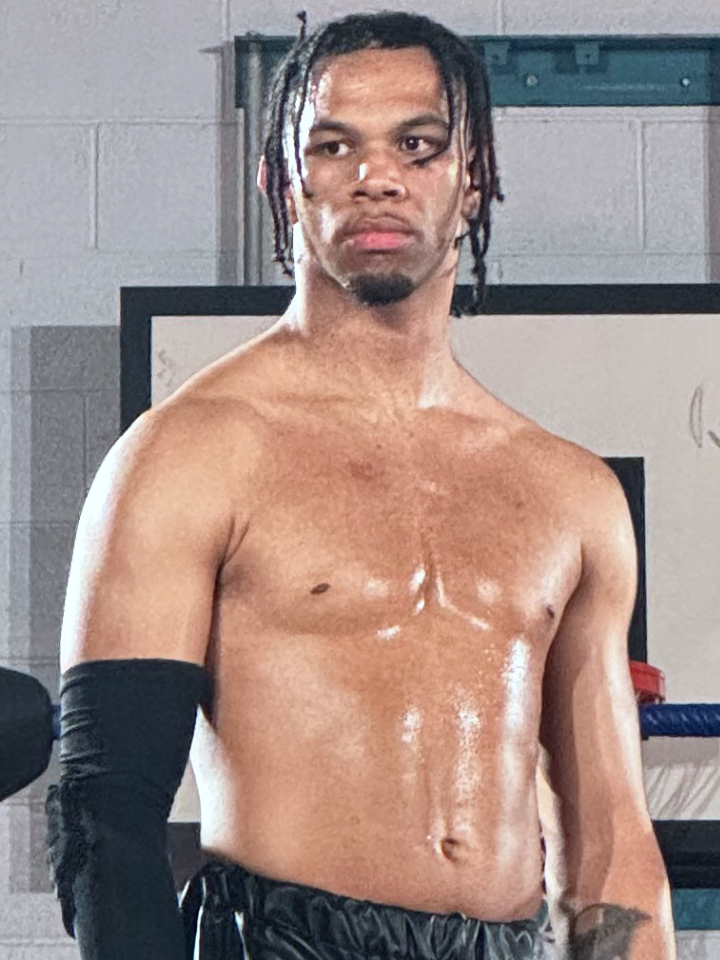
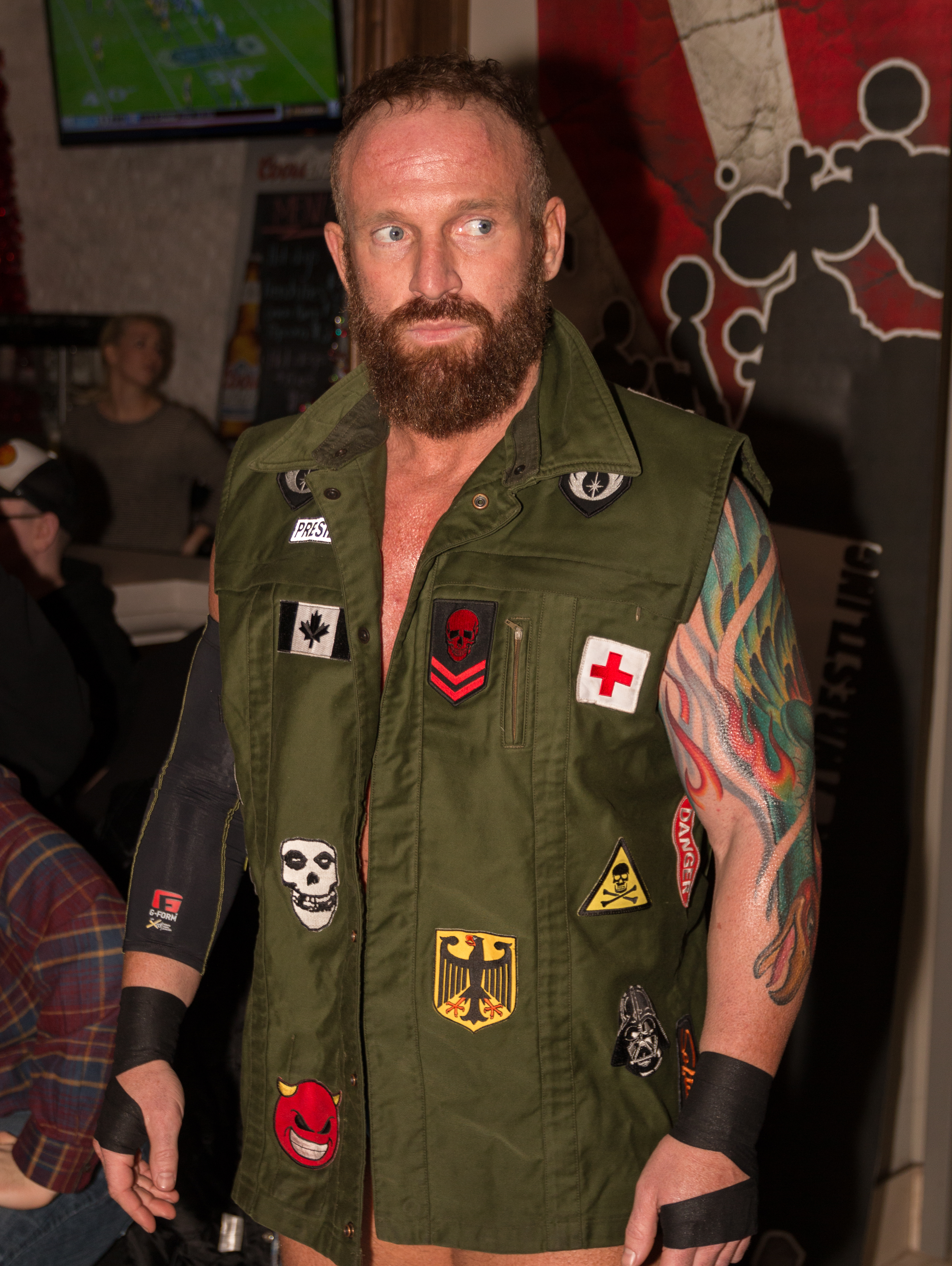
TNA X Division Champion Leon Slater defended his title against Eric Young. Young received this title shot from his Feast or Fired briefcase.

On the January 22 episode of Thursday Night Impact!, Eric Young won Briefcase No. 1 in the Feast or Fired match, which was revealed on the following week's episode to contain an opportunity at the TNA X Division Championship. On the March 5 episode, X Division Champion Leon Slater successfully defended the title against Nic Nemeth before being attacked by Young, ending with the latter piledriving the former on the arena floor. The week after, TNA announced that Young getting his X Division Championship opportunity against Slater at Sacrifice.

At Genesis on January 17, Léi Yǐng Lee was scheduled to defend the TNA Knockouts World Championship against Dani Luna, who ultimately pulled out of the match due to travel-related issues. A month later at No Surrender, NXT wrestler Arianna Grace defeated Lee to win the title. As Lee was the previous champion, and Luna was owed an opportunity, on the March 19 episode of Thursday Night Impact!, TNA Director of Authority Santino Marella and TNA Director of Operations Daria Rae announced Grace defending her title against both women in a three-way match.

Following his retirement match against The System stablemate Eddie Edwards at Genesis, JDC introduced Bear Bronson as his replacement in The System on the January 22 episode of Thursday Night Impact!. However, just as JDC bade farewell to his fellow stablemates, Edwards would hit him with a low blow as Brian Myers and Bronson attacked Moose. Cedric Alexander would intervene, wielding a chair, only to hit Moose with it and join The System. Edwards would reveal that they had intended to get rid of Moose alongside JDC, believing he no longer trusted The System, and thus, would show why he could never defeat The System. Over the next month and a half, Moose feuded with the stable, facing each member in singles matches. He would defeat Alexander in an Atlanta Street Fight on March 12, and then Myers the following week. After the latter, TNA announced that Moose would face off against Edwards at Sacrifice. On the final episode before Sacrifice, Moose defeated Bronson.

As Jada Stone was doing a promo on the January 29 episode of Thursday Night Impact, Order 4 (Mustafa Ali, Jason Hotch, John Skyler, Special Agent 0, and Tasha Steelz) interrupted her, and then Steelz attacked her. Officials separated Order 4 away from Stone and Elijah helped Stone stand back up. On the February 5 episode, Stone and Elijah faced Steelz and Ali in an intergender tag team match which ended with Ali hitting Stone with a Tombstone Piledriver, allowing Steelz to pickup the victory for Order 4. Stone and Steelz would go one-on-one three weeks later with Stone earning the pinfall victory. After Stone lost a match on the March 19 episode, Order 4 came out to surround her in the ring. Trey Miguel came to her aid with a steel chair to stop a potential assault. Then, TNA announced that Stone and Miguel against Steelz and Ali in an intergender tag team match at Sacrifice.

On the March 5 episode of Thursday Night Impact! in Atlanta, Georgia, A. J. Francis and The Home Town Man brawled after Francis disrespected Atlanta, Home Town Man's hometown. Their brawl interrupted Frankie Kazarian's The King Speech segment with Elijah. After The Home Town Man got hit with a chokeslam by Francis into the crowd, Elijah checked on him. The following week, Francis wrestled Elijah with Kazarian on commentary. After Elijah threw a drink at Kazarian, Kazarian assisted Francis to get the win. Kazarian and Francis beat down Elijah until The Home Town Man stopped them with a pipe. Then, TNA announced Francis and Kazarian against Elijah and The Home Town Man in a tag team match. On the final episode before Sacrifice, The Home Town Man grabbed a victory against Kazarian, overcoming Francis' attempt to help Kazarian. After the match, the two assaulted The Home Town Man until Elijah interfered, ending with Elijah hitting Francis with a guitar.

At No Surrender, Mara Sadé and Elayna Black competed in a battle royal for a future TNA Knockouts World Championship match where Sadé eliminated Black. On the February 19 episode, Black called out Sadé for eliminating her in the battle royal and questioned her dedication to wrestling, ending with Sadé challenging Black. Their match took place two weeks later where Black gained the victory after she hit Sadé with brass knuckles. Afterwards, TNA announced a No Disqualification match between the two wrestlers at Sacrifice.

== Event ==
Other on-screen personnel
Role	Name
Commentators	Matthew Rehwoldt
Commentators	Tom Hannifan
Ring announcer	McKenzie Mitchell
Referees	Paige Prinzivalli
Referees	Daniel Spencer
Referees	Frank Gastineau
Referees	Alice Lane
Interviewer	Gia Miller

=== Pre-show ===
The first match of the countdown show was between Ryan Nemeth and BDE. BDE hit a suicide dive while live-streaming it, but Nemeth eventually seized control. Although BDE attempted a comeback with a sunset flip, Nemeth was able to regain control. BDE countered a hangman’s neckbreaker into a springboard cutter. He attempted a frog splash, but Nemeth countered it and immediately transitioned into a roll-up and grabbed BDE's tights, securing the victory.

Next, Tessa Blanchard (accompanied by Mila Moore and Victoria Crawford) faced Jody Threat (accompanied by Myla Grace and Harley Hudson). Threat controlled the match early until Blanchard targeted Threat's knee. Threat regained the momentum, but Blanchard was able to interrupt her offense for a near-fall. After Threat hit a dead-lift running powerbomb, she attempted a pinfall that was broken by Moore placing Blanchard’s hand on the bottom rope. This interference triggered a brawl among the wrestlers at ringside. With the referee distracted, Moore struck Threat with a shoe, allowing Blanchard to hit a hammerlock DDT to secure the pinfall victory. The brawl continued as Blanchard used power cables to drag Threat around the ring.

=== Preliminary matches ===
The opening match of the event was Leon Slater defending the TNA X Division Championship against Eric Young. Before the match began, Young ambushed a decoy of the champion. The real Slater appeared through the crowd to catch Young off guard with a dive, leading to a brawl at ringside before the match officially commenced. Slater immediately gained the advantage, nearly securing a victory within the first 30 seconds following a 450° Swanton Bomb. Slater attempted the Styles Clash, which Young countered by biting the champion before successfully executing the move himself for a near-fall. Young hit a Death Valley Driver and a top-rope elbow drop for a near-fall, and then Slater hit the Blue Thunder Bomb for a near-fall. Young executed a piledriver on the ring apron and attempted a pinfall but Slater managed to kick out. Slater blocked a top-rope piledriver attempt, allowing him to hit the Styles Clash and a second 450° Swanton Bomb to retain the title.

Next, A. J. Francis and Frankie Kazarian teamed up against The Home Town Man and Elijah. The Home Town Man and Elijah grabbed the early momentum with a synchronized double rope-walk maneuver and a springboard dive from Elijah to the floor. The match shifted when Francis tripped The Home Town Man on the ropes, allowing Kazarian to execute a springboard leg drop. Francis and Kazarian then isolated The Home Town Man. Elijah eventually got the hot tag after The Home Town Man countered a chokeslam attempt. Elijah hit the Twist and Shout for a near-fall on Kazarian. After a failed interference involving a guitar, Francis sent Elijah into the stairs and intercepted a dive from The Home Town Man, executing a chokeslam onto the ring apron. Kazarian then hit the Fade to Black on The Home Town Man to win the match for his team.

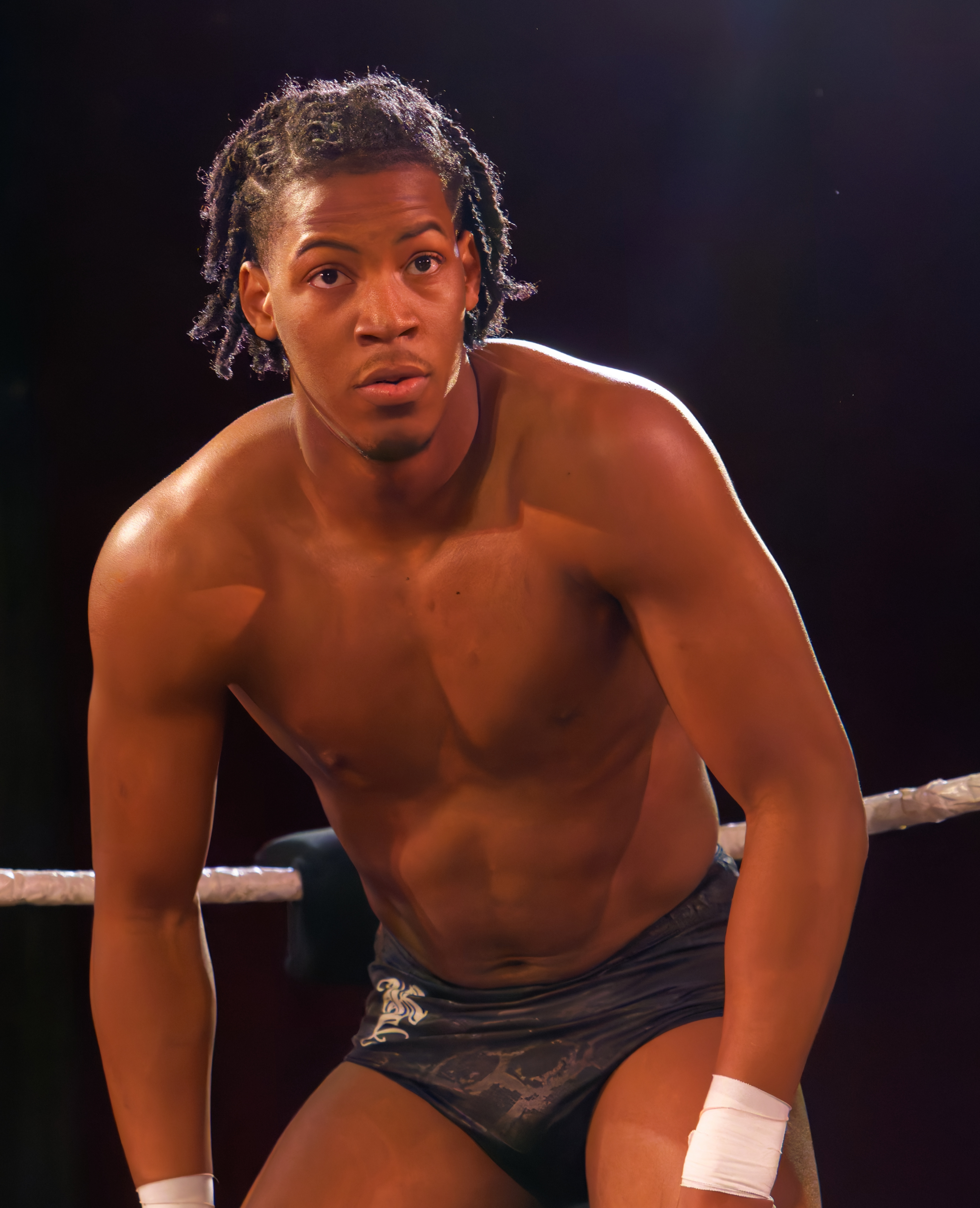
Ricky Sosa officially joined the Total Nonstop Action Wrestling (TNA) roster.

Before the next match, Tommy Dreamer and Chris Bey announced the official signing of Ricky Sosa.

Next, the TNA Knockouts World Championship was on the line in a triple threat match involving defending champion Arianna Grace (accompanied by Channing "Stacks" Lorenzo), Léi Yǐng Lee (accompanied by Xia Brookside), and Dani Luna. Luna attacked Lee during the introductions. Luna utilized a power-based offense, while Lee utilized her agility. As Luna gained momentum, Lorenzo pulled the ropes to send her to the floor, allowing Grace to target Lee. Brookside and Stacks had a physical altercation at ringside, which distracted the official and the participants alike. Luna attempted an avalanche Samoan drop on Grace, which was intercepted by Lee. After Lorenzo and Grace were cleared from the ring, Lee and Luna exchanged strikes. Lee successfully executed the Warrior's Way on Luna and went for a pinfall; however, Lorenzo pulled Lee out of the ring. Grace capitalized on the opening to retain the title.

Order 4's Mustafa Ali and Tasha Steelz versus Trey Miguel and Jada Stone in an intergender tag team match was next. Ali and Miguel began the match with fast-paced exchanges. Stone gained momentum against Ali with a spinning DDT and a hurricanrana that sent him to the floor. Miguel neutralized Order 4 with a dive. Steelz and Ali hit a Dance with the Devil DDT onto the apron and a top-rope cutter combination, though Miguel and Stone broke pinfall attempts. Stone executed a Destroyer on Ali and a moonsault to the floor onto both opponents. Stone countered a Splash Mountain into a hurricanrana, followed by a twisting moonsault for a near-fall. However, the numerical advantage of Order 4 proved decisive; while Steelz distracted the official with Miguel's TNA International Championship belt, the rest of Order 4 ambushed Miguel at ringside and restrained him to the bottom rope with zip ties. With Stone isolated, Ali executed the Dance with the Devil followed by a 450° splash for the pinfall victory.

The following match was between Moose (accompanied by Alisha Edwards) and Eddie Edwards with The System banned from ringside. Eddie attempted to bring a kendo stick into the ring, but the official refused to start the match until the weapon was removed. Alisha took the kendo stick away from her husband, allowing Moose to start the match with a strike. Order 4's Special Agent 0 attacked Moose from behind 31 seconds after the match began, which prompted the referee to award the victory to Moose via disqualification.

The next match was Elayna Black versus Mara Sadé in a No Disqualification match. The match began with a brawl at ringside after Black disarmed Sadé of a decorative baseball bat. Black used a kendo stick and a fire extinguisher against Sadé’s face. Sadé mounted a comeback using the baseball bat and a springboard crossbody for a near-fall. Black scattered thumbtacks on the ring. Black's Blackout attempt was countered by Sadé, who executed a backdrop and a slam into the thumbtacks. Sadé then performed a moonsault to secure the pinfall victory.

Next, Jeff Hardy and Vincent competed against The System's Cedric Alexander and Brian Myers. Hardy and Vincent utilized the Poetry in Motion and stereo dives to the floor to gain the initial advantage. However, The System gained control by isolating Vincent. Hardy got the hot tag from Vincent, executing a leg drop to Alexander's groin and attempted a Twist of Fate. The System responded with a spear from Myers and a Michinoku Driver from Alexander for a near-fall. Hardy and Vincent attempted a Twist of Fate and twisting DDT combination on Alexander but was interrupted by Myers to prevent the pinfall. A footage appeared on the titantron, showing Vincent's The Righteous tag team partner Dutch standing over a bloodied Matt Hardy, Jeff Hardy's brother and tag team partner. The distraction allowed Myers to hit the Roster Cut on Jeff, followed immediately by Alexander’s Lumbar Check to get the victory for The System.

Prior to the main event, The Elegance Brand addressed the absence of Ash by Elegance, claiming she was sidelined due to the hostile reception from the audience, before directing insults toward ODB. ODB appeared and introduced the returning Taryn Terrell to assist her. After Mr. Elegance noted that his presence still gave The Elegance Brand a three-on-two advantage, ODB introduced Mickie James. ODB, Terrell, and James subsequently cleared the ring, physically overwhelming The Elegance Brand to conclude the segment.

=== Main event ===
The main event was Mike Santana's TNA World Championship defense against Steve Maclin. Santana hit a superkick that legitimately knocked out Maclin. The referee immediately signaled for medical assistance, and TNA officials, including TNA President Carlos Silva and medical personnel, attended to Maclin. Eddie Edwards, who has a future TNA World Championship opportunity as his Feast or Fired prize, came out to attack Santana. They brawled at ringside, and Santana setup a table. Santana eventually regained the upper hand, hitting the Spin the Block and a frog splash on Edwards on the table. Santana officially retained the title due to the match being ruled a no contest due to Maclin's inability to compete.

== Reception ==
Thomas Hall of 411Mania gave the event an overall rating of 6 out of 10. The X Division Championship match between Leon Slater and Eric Young received the highest individual grade of the night with a B+; Hall noted that the victory established Slater as an "absolute star" by defeating a former world champion. Three matches were rated B−, including the TNA Knockouts World Championship triple threat, the intergender tag team match, and the contest between The System and the team of Jeff Hardy and Vincent. Hall described the finish of the Knockouts title match as an effective way to portray Arianna Grace as an "annoying, beatable champion". He expressed difficulty with the "suspension of disbelief" regarding Jada Stone's sustained offense against Mustafa Ali. He further characterized the tag team match involving Hardy and Vincent as a "means to an end" to facilitate The Righteous' betrayal of The Hardys. The tag team match featuring Elijah and The Home Town Man against A. J. Francis and Frankie Kazarian received a C+, with Hall noting that the intersection of the two concurrent feuds worked well. The No Disqualification match between Elayna Black and Mara Sadé received a C, the lowest rating of the main card. Hall argued that the match did not require the special stipulation and critiqued Black's performance, stating she "doesn't feel like the most natural in the ring".

== Aftermath ==
Steve Maclin, who was knocked out during the TNA World Championship match, was evaluated by TNA officials for a concussion and was sent to a hospital for further tests. TNA President Carlos Silva told Sports Illustrated that Maclin cleared all tests and was not diagnosed with a concussion. He was released to his hotel later that night. There was no timetable for his return to in-ring competition. Prior to the taping of the April 2 episode of Thursday Night Impact!, Silva presented Eddie Edwards and referee Alice Lane with All-Star Awards, an award the promotion created in May 2025 to honor standout personnel. Lane immediately stopped the match when Maclin appeared to have suffered an injury, and Edwards had an unscripted impromptu brawl with Mike Santana as a distraction to allow medical personnel to safely bring Maclin backstage.

== Results ==
No.	Results	Stipulations	Times
1^{P}	Ryan Nemeth defeated BDE by pinfall	Singles match	6:34
2^{P}	Tessa Blanchard (with Mila Moore and Victoria Crawford) defeated Jody Threat (with Myla Grace and Harley Hudson) by pinfall	Singles match	6:14
3	Leon Slater (c) defeated Eric Young by pinfall	Singles match for the TNA X Division Championship; This was Young's Feast or Fired X Division Title match.	15:19
4	Frankie Kazarian and A. J. Francis defeated Elijah and The Home Town Man by pinfall	Tag team match	11:24
5	Arianna Grace (c) (with Channing "Stacks" Lorenzo) defeated Léi Yǐng Lee (with Xia Brookside) and Dani Luna by pinfall	Three-way match for the TNA Knockouts World Championship	13:47
6	Order 4 (Mustafa Ali and Tasha Steelz) (with Jason Hotch and John Skyler) defeated Trey Miguel and Jada Stone by pinfall	Intergender tag team match	15:11
7	Moose (with Alisha Edwards) defeated Eddie Edwards by disqualification	Singles match	0:32
8	Mara Sadé defeated Elayna Black by pinfall	No Disqualification match	9:29
9	The System (Brian Myers and Cedric Alexander) defeated Jeff Hardy and Vincent by pinfall	Tag team match	8:44
10	Mike Santana (c) vs. Steve Maclin ended in a no contest	Singles match for the TNA World Championship	2:18
(c) / – the champion(s) heading into the match; P / – the match was broadcast on the pre-show
