= TNA Sacrifice (2024) =

2024 Total Nonstop Action Wrestling event

Sacrifice
- Promotional poster featuring Jody Threat, Eric Young, Chris Sabin, Ace Austin, and Chris Bey
- Promotion: Total Nonstop Action Wrestling
- Date: March 8, 2024
- City: Windsor, Ontario, Canada
- Venue: St. Clair College Sportsplex

TNA+ Monthly Specials chronology
← Previous; No Surrender	Next → Under Siege

Sacrifice chronology
← Previous; 2023	Next → 2025

The 2024 Sacrifice was a professional wrestling event produced by Total Nonstop Action Wrestling. The event took place on March 8, 2024, at the St. Clair College Sportsplex in Windsor, Ontario, Canada and aired on TNA+. It was the 15th event under the Sacrifice chronology, and the first Sacrifice event promoted under the TNA name since the 2016 event.

Eleven matches were contested at the event, including two on the Countdown to Sacrifice pre-show and one taped as a digital exclusive. In the main event, Moose defeated Eric Young to retain the TNA World Championship. In other prominent matches, Jordynne Grace defeated Tasha Steelz and Xia Brookside to retain the TNA Knockouts World Championship, Hammerstone defeated Josh Alexander, Spitfire (Dani Luna and Jody Threat) defeated MK Ultra (Killer Kelly and Masha Slamovich) to win the TNA Knockouts World Tag Team Championship, and The System (Brian Myers and Eddie Edwards) defeated ABC (Chris Bey and Ace Austin) to win the TNA World Tag Team Championship.

== Production ==
Other on-screen personnel
Role:	Name:
Commentators	Tom Hannifan
Commentators	Matthew Rehwoldt
Ring announcer	Jennifer Chung
Referees	Daniel Spencer
Referees	Allison Leigh
Referees	Frank Gastineau
Referees	Paige Prinzivalli
Interviewer	Gia Miller

=== Background ===
Sacrifice was an annual professional wrestling pay-per-view (PPV) event produced by Total Nonstop Action Wrestling that was first held in August 2005. The promotion's PPV schedule was reduced to four quarterly events in 2013, dropping Sacrifice. The event would return in 2014 and in 2016, the latter as a special edition of Impact!. The event would be revived in 2020 as a monthly special for Impact Plus.

On, January 4, 2024, TNA announced that Sacrifice will take place on Friday, March 8, 2024, and would be held at St. Clair College in Windsor, Ontario, Canada.

=== Storylines ===
The event will feature several professional wrestling matches, with results predetermined by TNA. Storylines are produced on the company's weekly programs, Impact! and Xplosion.

At No Surrender, Eric Young defeated Frankie Kazarian to earn a TNA World Championship match at Sacrifice. Later that night, Moose retained the world title over Alex Shelley in a No Surrender Rules match. His next defense against Young was then made official for Sacrifice. Additionally, on the February 29 episode of TNA Impact!, The System (Moose, Brian Myers, and Eddie Edwards) defeated Young and TNA World Tag Team Champions ABC (Ace Austin and Chris Bey) in a six-man tag team match, with Myers pinning Bey to win. This granted Myers and Edwards a tag team title match against ABC at Sacrifice.

Ever since Nic Nemeth (formerly Dolph Ziggler in WWE) debuted in TNA at Hard To Kill, he had been targeted by Steve Maclin, with the latter even attacking the former during a match for World Wrestling Council in Puerto Rico. On the February 29 TNA Impact!, after Maclin won his match, Nemeth appeared on the video wall via a prerecorded promo in New Japan Pro-Wrestling, challenging Maclin to a match at Sacrifice that was accepted.

At No Surrender, the debuting Mustafa Ali defeated Chris Sabin to win the TNA X Division Championship, although Sabin was distracted by The Good Hands (John Skyler and Jason Hotch) before the end of the match. On the subsequent episode of TNA Impact!, Ali held a "Championship Inauguration Ceremony" only to be interrupted by Sabin, who called foul on his mission to bring change to the X Division. Sabin would then be attacked by Ali and The Good Hands before being saved by Intergalactic Jet Setters (Kushida and Kevin Knight). Later in the night, it was announced that Sabin, Kushida, and Knight, would face Ali and The Good Hands in a six-man tag team match at Sacrifice. The following week, Ali defeated Knight in a non-title match, after which The Good Hands attacked and injured Knight's arm, leaving him unable to compete at Sacrifice. Alex Shelley would choose to replace him. Meanwhile, Ali revealed that while he appreciated The Good Hands' assistance, after they lost to Shelley and Kushida earlier, he chose to replace them with Grizzled Young Vets (Zack Gibson and James Drake).

Xia Brookside and Tasha Steelz began a brief rivalry after Hard To Kill, starting with Brookside beating Steelz on the January 18 TNA Impact!, to which Steelz would return the favor three weeks later. On the February 29 TNA Impact!, the two had a rubber match where the winner would earn a TNA Knockouts World Championship at Sacrifice. However, the match spilled to the outside as Brookside and Steelz continued brawling, ending the match in a double countout. Knockouts World Champion Jordynne Grace would later appear on the entrance ramp, declaring that she would defend her title against both women in a three-way match at the event.

At Hard To Kill, former MLW World Heavyweight Champion Hammerstone made his TNA debut, losing to Josh Alexander. Over a month later on the February 29 TNA Impact!, TNA announced that Hammerstone had signed with the promotion, with a rematch against Alexander being set for Sacrifice.

At No Surrender, PCO defeated Kon by disqualification when Kon hit him with a chair. Kon would continue his assault, trapping PCO's arm in the entrance tunnel and snapping his neck with the chair. On the subsequent episode of TNA Impact!, PCO returned and attacked Kon on the set of Alan Angels' "Sound Check," with TNA announcing the week after that the two would face off in a no disqualification match at Sacrifice.

==== Changed match ====
On March 8, TNA announced that Laredo Kid was unable to compete at Sacrifice due to ongoing travel issues. As he was set to challenge Crazzy Steve for the TNA Digital Media Championship on the show, former and longest-reigning Digital Media Champion Joe Hendry was announced as his replacement.

== Results ==
No.	Results	Stipulations	Times
1^{D}	Bhupinder Gujjar defeated Deaner by pinfall (Note: The match was taped for a TNA Digital Exclusive that aired on March 12.)	Singles match	4:51
2^{P}	Crazzy Steve (c) defeated Joe Hendry by pinfall	Singles match for the TNA Digital Media Championship	4:07
3^{P}	Speedball Mountain (Trent Seven and Mike Bailey) defeated The Rascalz (Trey Miguel and Zachary Wentz) by pinfall	Tag team match	7:59
4	Nic Nemeth defeated Steve Maclin by pinfall	Singles match	14:22
5	The System (Brian Myers and Eddie Edwards) (with Alisha Edwards) defeated ABC (Chris Bey and Ace Austin) (c) by pinfall	Tag team match for the TNA World Tag Team Championship	13:22
6	PCO defeated Kon by pinfall	No Disqualification match	8:22
7	Spitfire (Dani Luna and Jody Threat) defeated MK Ultra (Killer Kelly and Masha Slamovich) (c) by pinfall	Tag team match for the TNA Knockouts World Tag Team Championship	2:34
8	Hammerstone defeated Josh Alexander by pinfall	Singles match	18:19
9	Grizzled Young Vets (Zack Gibson and James Drake) and Mustafa Ali defeated Time Machine (Chris Sabin, Kushida and Alex Shelley) by pinfall	Six-man tag team match	14:11
10	Jordynne Grace (c) defeated Tasha Steelz and Xia Brookside by pinfall	Three-way match for the TNA Knockouts World Championship	12:38
11	Moose (c) defeated Eric Young by pinfall	Singles match for the TNA World Championship	22:05
(c) / – the champion(s) heading into the match; D / – this was a dark match; P / – the match was broadcast on the pre-show
