= Impact Wrestling Sacrifice (2023) =

2023 Impact Wrestling event

Sacrifice
- Promotional poster
- Promotion: Impact Wrestling
- Date: March 24, 2023
- City: Windsor, Ontario, Canada
- Venue: St. Clair College Sportsplex

Impact Plus Monthly Specials chronology
← Previous; No Surrender	Next → Under Siege

Sacrifice chronology
← Previous; 2022	Next → 2024

The 2023 Sacrifice was a professional wrestling event produced by Impact Wrestling. The event took place on March 24, 2023, at the St. Clair College Sportsplex in Windsor, Ontario, Canada, and aired on Impact Plus and YouTube. It was the 14th event under the Sacrifice chronology, and Impact's first televised event in Canada since 2019. The event also featured wrestlers from partner promotion New Japan Pro-Wrestling (NJPW).

Eleven matches were contested at the event, including two on the pre-show and one taped as a digital exclusive. In the main event, Time Machine (Alex Shelley, Chris Sabin and Kushida) defeated Frankie Kazarian, Rich Swann and Steve Maclin in a six-man tag team match. In other prominent matches, Bully Ray defeated Tommy Dreamer in a Busted Open match, Trey Miguel defeated Lince Dorado to retain the Impact X Division Championship, Joe Hendry defeated Brian Myers to retain the Impact Digital Media Championship, and Mike Bailey defeated Jonathan Gresham in the opening bout. The event also featured the returns of Scott D'Amore and Tasha Steelz, and a special appearance by former Detroit Red Wings forward Darren McCarty. On the pre-show, it was announced that Josh Alexander had suffered a torn triceps and was vacating the Impact World Championship. His opponent at Rebellion, Steve Maclin, took his place in the main event.

== Production ==
=== Background ===
Sacrifice was an annual professional wrestling pay-per-view (PPV) event produced by Impact Wrestling (then known as Total Nonstop Action Wrestling (TNA)) that was first held in August 2005. The promotion's PPV schedule was reduced to four quarterly events in 2013, dropping Sacrifice. The event would return in 2014 and in 2016, the latter as a special edition of Impact!. The event would be revived in 2020 as a monthly special for Impact Plus.

On October 25, 2022, Impact Wrestling announced that Sacrifice will take place on Friday, March 24, 2023, at the St. Clair College in Windsor, Ontario, Canada.

=== Storylines ===
The event will feature several professional wrestling matches that involve different wrestlers from pre-existing scripted feuds and storylines. Wrestlers will portray villains, heroes, or less distinguishable characters in scripted events that build tension and culminate in a wrestling match or series of matches. Storylines are produced on Impact's weekly television program.

After Bully Ray turned on Impact World Champion Josh Alexander at the end of Over Drive the previous November, Ray would enter a feud with former friend Tommy Dreamer. For the next few months, Dreamer would remark about Ray constantly alienating himself from the locker room in order to achieve his goals, while Ray spat back about how he was always more popular than Dreamer in every promotion they have worked for together. The tension was so much that both wanted the other out of Impact Wrestling. At No Surrender, Dreamer and Ray would be part of a live edition of their podcast "Busted Open Radio" to air their grievances, with show host Dave LaGreca presiding as mediator. By the end of the segment, the animosity seemed to have cooled down between the two, until Ray threw coffee in Dreamer's face before smashing a coffee pot over his head. In a video posted on Impact's social media platforms, Dreamer would challenge Ray to a Busted Open match, where the winner would be the one who makes their opponent bleed, which was made official for Sacrifice.

On the Countdown to No Surrender pre-show, Gisele Shaw defeated Deonna Purrazzo due to interference from her stylist Jai Vidal and new bodyguard Savannah Evans. Two weeks later, on the March 9 episode of Impact!, while Shaw challenged Mickie James for the Knockouts World Championship, Purrazzo, who was on commentary for the match, neutralized Vidal and assisted James in getting the pin on Shaw. On March 14, Impact announced that a rematch between Purrazzo and Shaw was made official for Sacrifice.

On the November 10, 2022 episode of Impact!, Joe Hendry defeated Brian Myers to win the Impact Digital Media Championship. Since then, Hendry would be embroiled with feuds against Moose and The Major Players (Myers and Matt Cardona) over the title, though Myers had yet to get his rematch. On the March 9, 2023 episode of Impact!, Myers and Moose would attack Hendry backstage, with Myers claiming the Digital Media Championship belonged to him. The following week, Hendry confronted Impact Director of Authority Santino Marella about invoking Myers' rematch clause for him, and Marella made a title match between the two official for Sacrifice.

On the October 20, 2022 episode of Impact!, Eddie Edwards returned after failing to win the Impact World Championship at Bound for Glory. He would bring together his stable Honor No More (Matt Taven, Mike Bennett, Kenny King, PCO, and Vincent) and ask if they truly believe in their group. He would specifically single out PCO, whose loyalty he had been questioning since Slammiversary, until the latter snapped and attacked every single member of Honor No More. The stable would disband not long after. Two weeks later, PCO and Edwards brawled in the Great Basin Desert, which saw Edwards bury PCO under the sand. Two months later, at Hard To Kill, after Edwards defeated Jonathan Gresham, PCO returned and attacked Edwards with the shovel he was buried with. Their feud would continue to the March 9 episode of Impact!, where the two would again brawl in the desert, where it looked as if PCO would now bury Edwards until the former was run over by a car. The following week, Edwards cut an in-ring promo to state that his past with PCO was done with, unaware that PCO had made his way back to the arena and appeared on the entrance ramp. But before he could make it to the ring, he was jumped on the ramp by former stablemate Kenny King. With King now seemingly the prime suspect as the driver, a match between PCO and King was made official for Sacrifice.

==== Canceled match ====
At Hard To Kill, Mickie James defeated Jordynne Grace to win the Impact Knockouts World Championship in a Title vs. Career match. Although, during the match, Grace had James in a rear-naked choke and it seemed as though James tapped out, but the referee waived it off. On the March 9 episode of Impact!, after James successfully defended the title against Gisele Shaw, Impact announced that Grace will invoke her rematch clause and challenge James at Sacrifice. However, on March 23, Impact announced that James had sustained an injury and would be unable to compete at Sacrifice. The title situation would be addressed at the event.

== Event ==
Other on-screen personnel
Role	Name
Commentators	Tom Hannifan
Commentators	Matthew Rehwoldt
Ring announcer	David Penzer
Referees	Allison Leigh
Referees	Daniel Spencer
Referees	Frank Gastineau
Interviewer	Gia Miller

=== Pre-show ===
There were three matches that took place on the pre-show, with one taped as a digital exclusive. In the opener, Eddie Edwards faced Bhupinder Gujjar. Edwards won after hitting a Boston Knee Party.

In the main event of the pre-show, Rosemary (with Jessicka) took on KiLynn King (with Taylor Wilde). Rosemary won after Jessicka distracted King, allowing Rosemary to deliver a spear to King for the win.

=== Preliminary matches ===
The main card opened with a match between Mike Bailey and Jonathan Gresham. In the closing stages, Bailey delivered a tornado kick and locked in a leg lock for the submission win.

Next, Joe Hendry defended the Impact Digital Media Championship against Brian Myers. In the end, Myers delivered a DDT and a spear for a two-count. Hendry then delivered a cutter and delivered the Standing Ovation for the victory.

In the next bout, Deonna Purrazzo faced Gisele Shaw (with Jai Vidal). Purrazzo won after locking in the Venus de Milo, forcing Shaw to submit. After the match, Savannah Evans attacked Purrazzo, but Tasha Steelz came out and joined forces with Evans to continue beating down Purrazzo. Steelz then attacked Evans, and delivered a DDT and a cutter on Vidal.

Next, Kenny King took on PCO. In the end, King hit a snap suplex and a frog splash for a two-count. Eddie Edwards then came down and distracted PCO. King then hit a steel chair on PCO. PCO then punched King through the chair for the victory.

The next match was for the Impact X Division Championship, contested between defending champion Trey Miguel, and Lince Dorado. In the closing stages, Miguel delivered a sunset flip powerbomb and then flipped Dorado into a pin to retain the title.

Next, Bullet Club (Ace Austin and Chris Bey) defended the Impact World Tag Team Championship against TMDK (Shane Haste and Bad Dude Tito). In the end, Tito delivered a frog splash to Bey, but Austin broke it up. Bey and Austin then delivered double knees to Haste before hitting the Art of Finesse/The Fold combination for the win.

The penultimate match was a Busted Open match between Bully Ray and Tommy Dreamer; where the first person to bleed will lose. In the closing stages, Dreamer used a cheese grater and drove it into Bully's skull, which caused bleeding, but The Good Hands (Jason Hotch and John Skyler) covered it. Bully then delivered a low blow to Dreamer. Bully then sent Dreamer into the ring post, which caused Dreamer to bleed, causing the referee to end the match and declare Bully the winner. After the match, The Good Hands attacked Dreamer, until Yuya Uemura made the save, but Bully and The Good Hands also beat him down. Darren McCarty (the former Detroit Red Wings forward) attacked Bully, but The Good Hands also beat him down. Scott D'Amore made his return and sent down Gresham, Hendry, Bailey, Heath and Rhino to chase them down. D'Amore then delivered a Canadian Destroyer to Hotch.

=== Main event ===
The main event was a six-man tag team match between Time Machine and Steve Maclin, Rich Swann and Frankie Kazarian. Chris Sabin and Alex Shelley delivered a dropkick/flatliner combination on Kazarian for a two-count. Time Machine then delivered a triple dropkick in the corner to Swann. Kazarian delivered a backstabber to Kushida. Kazarian and Swann delivered cutters to Kushida. Swann then hit a 450° splash for a near fall. Shelley then hit a Sliced Bread on Swann. Kushida then locked in the Hoverboard Lock on Maclin for a tapout win.

== Results ==
No.	Results	Stipulations	Times
1^{D}	El Reverso defeated Sheldon Jean by pinfall (Note: The match was taped for an Impact Digital Exclusive that aired on March 28.)	Singles match	5:43
2^{P}	Eddie Edwards defeated Bhupinder Gujjar by pinfall	Singles match	7:26
3^{P}	Rosemary (with Jessicka) defeated KiLynn King (with Taylor Wilde) by pinfall	Singles match	9:06
4	Mike Bailey defeated Jonathan Gresham by submission	Singles match	19:30
5	Joe Hendry (c) defeated Brian Myers by pinfall	Singles match for the Impact Digital Media Championship	8:50
6	Deonna Purrazzo defeated Gisele Shaw (with Jai Vidal and Savannah Evans) by submission	Singles match	9:41
7	PCO defeated Kenny King (with Eddie Edwards) by pinfall	Singles match	10:38
8	Trey Miguel (c) defeated Lince Dorado by pinfall	Singles match for the Impact X Division Championship	11:49
9	Bullet Club (Ace Austin and Chris Bey) (c) defeated TMDK (Bad Dude Tito and Shane Haste) by pinfall	Tag team match for the Impact World Tag Team Championship	12:25
10	Bully Ray defeated Tommy Dreamer	Busted Open match	11:13
11	Time Machine (Alex Shelley, Chris Sabin, and Kushida) defeated Frankie Kazarian, Rich Swann, and Steve Maclin by submission	Six-man tag team match	21:55
(c) / – the champion(s) heading into the match; D / – this was a dark match; P / – the match was broadcast on the pre-show
