= TNA Sacrifice (2025) =

2025 Total Nonstop Action Wrestling event

Sacrifice
- Promotion: Total Nonstop Action Wrestling
- Date: March 14, 2025
- City: El Paso, Texas
- Venue: El Paso County Coliseum
- Attendance: 3,500

TNA+ Monthly Specials chronology
← Previous; Final Resolution	Next → Unbreakable

Sacrifice chronology
← Previous; 2024	Next → 2026

The 2025 Sacrifice was a professional wrestling event produced by Total Nonstop Action Wrestling. The event took place on March 14, 2025, at the El Paso County Coliseum in El Paso, Texas, and aired on TNA+. It was the 16th event under the Sacrifice chronology. Wrestlers from WWE's NXT brand, with which TNA has a partnership, also appeared at the event. The reported attendance was approximately 3,500, making Sacrifice TNA's 2nd largest attended event in the United States in over ten years after January 19's Genesis pay-per-view.

Ten matches were contested at the event, including one on the Countdown to Sacrifice pre-show. In the main event, Joe Hendry, Matt Hardy, Elijah, Leon Slater, and Nic Nemeth defeated The System (Eddie Edwards, Brian Myers, and JDC) and The Colóns (Eddie Colón and Orlando Colón) in a Steel Cage 10-man tag team match. In other prominent matches, Moose defeated Jeff Hardy in a Ladder match to retain the TNA X Division Championship, Masha Slamovich defeated NXT wrestler Cora Jade to retain the TNA Knockouts World Championship, and Ash by Elegance, Heather by Elegance, and The Personal Concierge defeated Spitfire (Dani Luna and Jody Threat) in a 2-on-3 Handicap match to win the TNA Knockouts World Tag Team Championship. The event was notable for the appearance of NXT wrestlers Lash Legend and Jakara Jackson from Meta-Four.

== Production ==
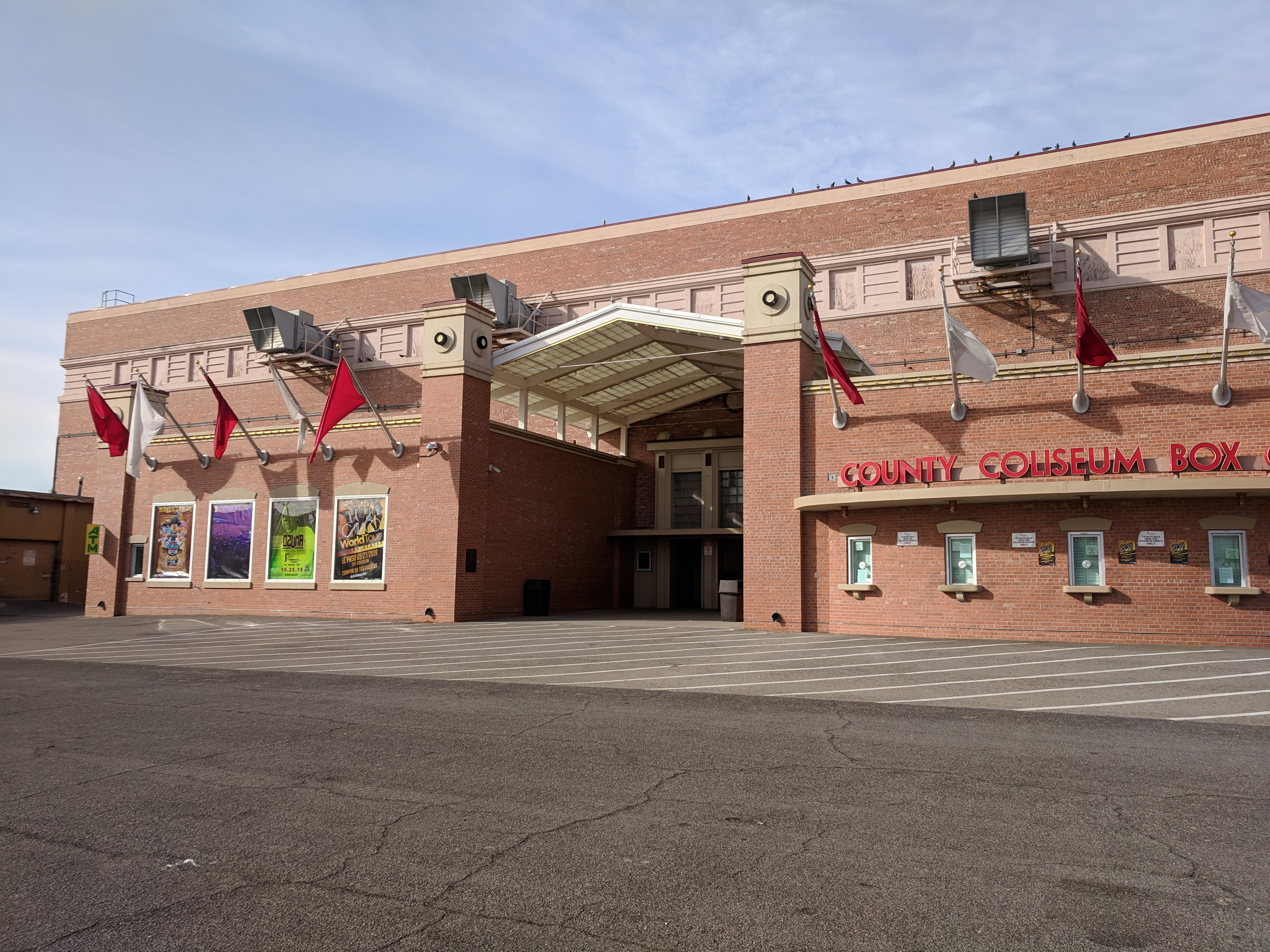
The event was held at El Paso County Coliseum in El Paso, Texas.

=== Background ===
Sacrifice is an annual professional wrestling pay-per-view (PPV) event produced by Total Nonstop Action Wrestling that was first held in August 2005. The promotion's PPV schedule was reduced to four quarterly events in 2013, dropping Sacrifice. The event would return in 2014 and 2016, the latter as a special edition of Impact!. The event would be revived in 2020 as a monthly special for Impact Plus.

On, December 4, 2024, TNA announced that Sacrifice would take place on Friday, March 14, 2025, at the El Paso County Coliseum in El Paso, Texas.

=== Storylines ===
The event featured professional wrestling matches that involve different wrestlers from pre-existing scripted feuds and storylines. Wrestlers portrayed villains, heroes, or less distinguishable characters in scripted events that build tension and culminate in a wrestling match or series of matches.

On January 19, at Genesis, after the TNA Knockouts World Champion Masha Slamovich retained her title after defeating Rosemary in a Clockwork Orange House of Fun match, she was confronted by NXT's Cora Jade. On the February 20 episode of TNA Impact!, Jade attacked Slamovich. Later that night, it was announced that Slamovich would defend her title against Jade at Sacrifice.

In July 2024, The Rascalz (Trey Miguel and Zachary Wentz) had a short-lived reunion with NXT's Wes Lee (a former co-founding member of the team who previously wrestled in TNA as Dezmond Xavier) before Lee turned on The Rascalz a month later. On the January 23 episode of TNA Impact!, Lee and his new allies Tyriek Igwe and Tyson Dupont cost The Rascalz their title match against NXT Tag Team Champions Axiom and Nathan Frazer. On the January 30 and February 6 episodes of Impact!, The Rascalz ran out to save Ace Austin from Lee, Igwe, and Dupont after Austin's matches against Lee and Dupont respectively, and Austin joined The Rascalz in their feud against Lee. Two weeks later, after The Rascalz defeated Igwe and Dupont, Lee challenged The Rascalz and Austin to a six-man tag team match at Sacrifice.

For several weeks, Sami Callihan and then-TNA Digital Media Champion PCO were taunted with vignettes displaying the number "23". This angle would culminate on the January 23, 2025 episode of TNA Impact!, where Steph De Lander, who had returned to the company following neck surgery in September, was revealed to be behind the vignettes. She also came out holding the TNA Digital Media Championship belt, claiming to have won it in her "divorce" from on-screen husband PCO (in real life, PCO departed TNA after his contract expired and the company opted not to renew it, thus the title was transferred to De Lander). De Lander would then bring out her real-life fiancé Mance Warner to attack Callihan from behind. Over the next month, Callihan and Warner would frequently fight around arenas, mostly ending with De Lander distracting Callihan long enough for Warner to recover. The two men would eventually meet in a match on February 27, but it quickly ended in a disqualification when Callihan hit Warner with a chair. The two continued to brawl until being broken up by security, by which point Santino Marella announced a rematch between them at Sacrifice in a street fight.

On the February 20 TNA Impact!, TNA World Champion Joe Hendry held an in-ring concert but was interrupted by the debut of The Colóns (Eddie Colón and Orlando Colón). The two were looking to attack Hendry only to be interrupted themselves by the debuting Elijah (formerly Elias in WWE). This soon led to a tag team match in the main event, with Hendry and Elijah defeating The Colóns. On the following week's episode, The System (TNA X Division Champion Moose, Brian Myers, Eddie Edwards, JDC, and Alisha Edwards) opened the show, with Myers expressing interest in bringing The Colóns into the stable. Eddie and Orlando would later come out to confirm that they would be aligned with The System. In the show's main event, The System's Moose, Myers, and Edwards defeated TNA World Tag Team Champions The Hardys (Matt Hardy and Jeff Hardy) and NXT Champion Oba Femi after brief interference from The Colóns. The System and The Colóns beat down The Hardys and Femi until Hendry and Elijah ran them all off. Santino Marella would come out to announce a ten-man tag team match for Sacrifice, where Matt and Hendry would pick three partners to face The Colóns and The System (Myers, Edwards, and JDC). On TNA's social media, Matt and Hendry named Elijah as their first partner. The following week, The Hardys beat The Colóns in a non-title match, albeit by disqualification due to interference from The System. Hendry, Elijah, and Leon Slater would run in to help The Hardys as Marella turned the ten-man tag team match at Sacrifice into a steel cage match. Slater was later named to Hendry's team at the same time. The week after, Edwards defeated Slater to earn the Colóns and The System the man advantage in the match, with Nic Nemeth being named the final member of Hendry's team soon after.

On the January 23 episode of TNA Impact!, TNA World Tag Team Champions The Hardys (Matt Hardy and Jeff Hardy) defeated The System (TNA X Division Champion Moose and JDC) in a non-title match, with Jeff pinning Moose to gain the win. Two weeks later, The Hardys teamed up with Leon Slater to defeat The System (Moose, JDC, and Edwards) in a six-man tag team match, with Jeff again pinning Moose to win. On the February 27 TNA Impact!, The Hardys and The System faced off again in a six-man tag team match, with Moose, Myers, and Edwards beating The Hardys and Oba Femi; Moose picking up the win by pinning Matt. After a brief brawl between The System, The Colóns, The Hardys, Femi, Joe Hendry, and Elijah, Santino Marella appeared on the entrance ramp to calm the situation. He would then announce that, due to Jeff's two pinfall wins over Moose, Jeff would challenge Moose for the TNA X Division Championship at Sacrifice in a ladder match.

On the February 20 TNA Impact!, in a backstage segment, Tessa Blanchard tried to get a physical done with TNA's medical staff. However, much to Blanchard's chagrin, the doctor was currently attending to Léi Ying Lee, who earlier had been sprayed with green mist by Rosemary after their match. A furious Blanchard stormed off before declaring she would not wrestle on that night's show. She was eventually forced to wrestle the following week by Santino Marella under the threat that she would be fired, where she picked up a quick victory. When Blanchard got backstage, she was confronted by Lee, who was tired of Blanchard's constant badmouthing of the Knockouts Division. Marella would break up the ensuing argument before making a match between the two women for Sacrifice.

On the January 23 TNA Impact!, Mike Santana cut an in-ring promo about how he was now the new standard of TNA and reasserted his goal of winning the TNA World Championship. Immediately after, however, Santana was upstaged by the returning Mustafa Ali, who announced not only his signing with TNA but also the launch of a "campaign" to become TNA World Champion. Ali would later form a cabinet with The Good Hands (John Skyler and Jason Hotch), later renamed "The Great Hands", and Tasha Steelz as his as heads of security and press secretary, respectively. On February 13, Ali held a town hall meeting with the locker room to nominate himself as the next challenger to the TNA World Championship but was shut down by Tommy Dreamer, who named Santana for the position. This led Ali to launch a smear campaign against Santana to become the number one contender. The following week, Santana was seen attending an Alcoholics Anonymous meeting, referencing his real-life rehabilitation from alcoholism, when Ali barged in to give a rousing speech to the attendees. However, when he was about to leave, Ali whispered to Santana, "Things can change, Mike. But people like you don't." The week after, following Santana's victory over NXT's Oro Mensah, a smear ad from Ali's cabinet played that accused Santana of secretly relapsing into alcohol abuse. On March 3, TNA announced on their website that Santana and Ali would face one-on-one at Sacrifice.

At Genesis, Spitfire (Dani Luna and Jody Threat) retained the TNA Knockouts World Tag Team Championship against Ash by Elegance and Heather by Elegance, despite interference from the latter team's manager, The Personal Concierge. After Ash, Heather, and the Personal Concierge complained to Santino Marella that the illegal woman was pinned in the match, Spitfire agreed to a rematch, with the added stipulation that the losers would become the winner's personal concierges for 24 hours. The match took place on the February 27 episode of TNA Impact!, with Spitfire retaining once again. Ash and Heather's service to Spitfire was seen on the following week's episode, but the two would attack the champions just as 24 hours was up due to a distraction by The Personal Concierge. The week after, Ash, Heather, and The Personal Concierge again complained to Marella about the stipulations they endured. As the three later got into an argument with the nearby Spitfire, Marella stepped in to offer the former group another Knockouts World Tag Team Championship match at Sacrifice. However, it would be as a three-on-two handicap match, with Ash and Heather teaming with The Personal Concierge against Spitfire.

== Reception ==
Kristian Thompson of TJR Wrestling praised the X Division title ladder match for both men taking "big (but safe) bumps and the crowd was loud throughout", called Blanchard-Lee a "terrific Knockouts match" that showcases the latter's clean and crisp "offensive arsenal", felt the main event was a "very safe cage match" that had "nothing brutal or special about it" outside of the Nic Nemeth heel turn, and was critical of both Knockouts title bouts falling flat, highlighting the handicap tag title match as a "waste of time and just silly." He gave the event a 7 out of 10, saying: "I found Sacrifice to be a mixed bag. It was a show of very good wrestling, but nothing that stood out as must-see in the end which is unfortunately what you usually get with these events between the big shows." Steve Cook of 411Mania also gave the event a 7 out of 10, saying "There were portions of this show I didn't like nearly as much as other people would, but overall it was an enjoyable show. Can't knock the effort of anybody here, they all did the best they could to put on a show." Thomas Hall, also writing for 411Mania, gave the event a 7.5 out of 10, saying "This was a back and forth show, as there were some good things on here that had me interested in what they were doing, but then they did some things that simply weren't very interesting."

== Results ==
No.	Results	Stipulations	Times
1^{P}	First Class (A. J. Francis and KC Navarro) defeated The Aztec Warriors (Laredo Kid and Octagón Jr.) by pinfall	Tag team match	6:45
2	Mance Warner (with Steph De Lander) defeated Sami Callihan by pinfall	Street Fight	10:47
3	Tessa Blanchard defeated Léi Ying Lee by pinfall	Singles match	11:14
4	The Rascalz (Trey Miguel and Zachary Wentz) and Ace Austin defeated Wes Lee, Tyson Dupont, and Tyriek Igwe by pinfall	"Lucha Rules" Six-man tag team match	9:54
5	Steve Maclin defeated Frankie Kazarian by pinfall	Singles match	8:49
6	Ash by Elegance, Heather by Elegance, and The Personal Concierge defeated Spitfire (Dani Luna and Jody Threat) (c) by pinfall	2-on-3 Handicap match for the TNA Knockouts World Tag Team Championship	9:07
7	Mustafa Ali (with Jason Hotch, John Skyler, and Tasha Steelz) defeated Mike Santana by pinfall	Singles match	13:24
8	Masha Slamovich (c) defeated Cora Jade by pinfall	Singles match for the TNA Knockouts World Championship	9:27
9	Moose (c) (with Alisha Edwards) defeated Jeff Hardy	Ladder match for the TNA X Division Championship	16:33
10	Joe Hendry, Matt Hardy, Elijah, Leon Slater, and Nic Nemeth defeated The System (Eddie Edwards, Brian Myers, and JDC) and The Colóns (Eddie Colón and Orlando Colón) by pinfall	Steel Cage 10-man tag team match	17:02
(c) / – the champion(s) heading into the match; P / – the match was broadcast on the pre-show
