= TNA Sacrifice =

Total Nonstop Action Wrestling pay-per-view event series

Sacrifice
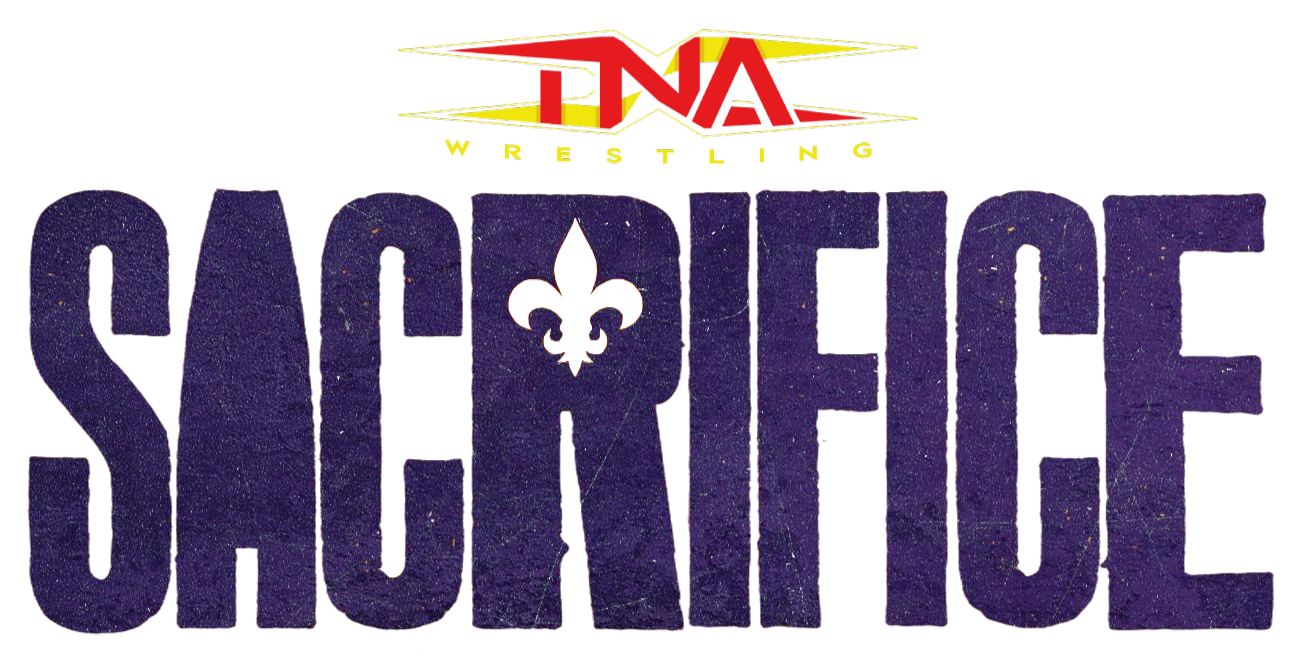
- TNA Sacrifice logo used in 2026
- Promotions: Total Nonstop Action Wrestling
- First event: Sacrifice (2005)

Sacrifice is a professional wrestling event held by Total Nonstop Action Wrestling. It was originally held as a pay-per-view event between 2005 and 2014. The first Sacrifice event took place in August 2005. When event names were shuffled by TNA for 2006, the event was moved to May. Sacrifice has had a tradition of being the final round of tournaments. Sacrifice 2005 saw Samoa Joe defeat A.J. Styles to win the Super X Cup. Sacrifice 2006 was the final round of the World X Cup Tournament. Sacrifice 2008 continued the tradition with the finals of the Deuces Wild Tag Team Tournament. Sacrifice 2009 featured Beer Money, Inc. defeating The British Invasion in the finals of the Team 3D Invitational Tag Team Tournament. All events take place inside the Impact! Zone. On January 11, 2013, TNA announced that in 2013 will be only four PPVs, dropping Sacrifice. In 2016, Sacrifice was held as a special edition of Impact Wrestling and the promotion revived it as a monthly special for Impact Plus in 2020.

== History ==
TNA Sacrifice logo used from 2009 to 2016

The inaugural Sacrifice event took place on August 14, 2005, at the TNA Impact! Zone in Orlando, Florida. On the third Sacrifice, which took place on May 13, 2007, at the Impact! Zone in Florida, Kurt Angle became the inaugural TNA World Heavywight Champion, by defeating Christian Cage and Sting in a three-way match. Sacrifice remained a regular TNA's pay-per-view until the last event at the time, which took place on April 27, 2014, at the Impact Zone. On April 26, 2016, TNA filmed a special televised Sacrifice event at the Impact Zone, which aired on tape delay on April 26. On 2017, after Anthem Sports & Entertainment purchased a majority stake of TNA, Anthem re-branded TNA as Impact Wrestling.

On January 29, 2020, Impact retrieved the Sacrifice event as a monthly special for Impact Plus, where the event itself took part on February 22, at the Davis Arena, in Louisville, Kentucky. Since of April 2020, due to the COVID-19 pandemic in the United States, Impact had to present the majority of its programming from a behind closed doors set at Skyway Studios in Nashville, Tennessee. The 13th Sacrifice event, which took place on March 5, 2022, at the Paristown Hall in Louisville, saw the return of live attendance.

== Events ==
#	Event	Date	City	Venue	Main event	Ref.
1	TNA Sacrifice (2005)	August 14, 2005	Orlando, Florida	TNA Impact! Zone	Jeff Jarrett and Rhino vs. Raven and Sabu in a tag team match	
2	TNA Sacrifice (2006)	May 14, 2006	Orlando, Florida	TNA Impact! Zone	Christian Cage (c) vs. Abyss in a Full Metal Mayhem match for the NWA World Heavyweight Championship	
3	TNA Sacrifice (2007)	May 13, 2007	Orlando, Florida	TNA Impact! Zone	Christian Cage vs. Kurt Angle vs. Sting in a three-way match to crown the first TNA World Heavyweight Champion	
4	TNA Sacrifice (2008)	May 11, 2008	Orlando, Florida	TNA Impact! Zone	Samoa Joe (c) vs. Kaz vs. Scott Steiner in a three-way match for the TNA World Heavyweight Championship	
5	TNA Sacrifice (2009)	May 24, 2009	Orlando, Florida	TNA Impact! Zone	Mick Foley (c) vs. Jeff Jarrett vs. Kurt Angle vs. Sting in a four-way Ultimate Sacrifice match for the TNA World Heavyweight Championship	
6	TNA Sacrifice (2010)	May 16, 2010	Orlando, Florida	TNA Impact! Zone	Rob Van Dam (c) vs. A.J. Styles for the TNA World Heavyweight Championship	
7	TNA Sacrifice (2011)	May 15, 2011	Orlando, Florida	Impact Zone	Sting (c) vs. Rob Van Dam for the TNA World Heavyweight Championship	
8	TNA Sacrifice (2012)	May 13, 2012	Orlando, Florida	Impact Zone	Bobby Roode (c) vs. Rob Van Dam in a ladder match for the TNA World Heavyweight Championship	
9	TNA Sacrifice (2014)	April 27, 2014	Orlando, Florida	Impact Zone	Eric Young (c) vs. Magnus for the TNA World Heavyweight Championship	
10	TNA Sacrifice (2016)	April 26, 2016 (Note: The event was taped on March 19, 2016.)	Orlando, Florida	Impact Zone	Ethan Carter III vs. Mike Bennett	
11	Impact Wrestling Sacrifice (2020)	February 22, 2020	Louisville, Kentucky	Davis Arena	Ace Austin (c-X Division) vs. Tessa Blanchard (c-World) in a non-title champion vs. champion match	
12	Impact Wrestling Sacrifice (2021)	March 13, 2021	Nashville, Tennessee	Skyway Studios	Rich Swann (c-Impact) vs. Moose (c-TNA) in a championship unification match for the Impact World Championship and the TNA World Heavyweight Championship	
13	Impact Wrestling Sacrifice (2022)	March 5, 2022	Louisville, Kentucky	Old Forester's Paristown Hall	Moose (c) vs. Heath for the Impact World Championship	
14	Impact Wrestling Sacrifice (2023)	March 24, 2023	Windsor, Ontario, Canada	St. Clair College	Frankie Kazarian, Rich Swann and Steve Maclin vs. Time Machine (Alex Shelley, Chris Sabin and Kushida) in a six-man tag team match	
15	TNA Sacrifice (2024)	March 8, 2024	Windsor, Ontario, Canada	St. Clair College	Moose (c) vs. Eric Young for the TNA World Championship	
16	TNA Sacrifice (2025)	March 14, 2025	El Paso, Texas	El Paso County Coliseum	Joe Hendry, Matt Hardy, Elijah, Leon Slater, and Nic Nemeth vs. The System (Brian Myers, Eddie Edwards, and JDC) and The Colóns (Eddie Colón and Orlando Colón) in a 10-man tag team steel cage match	
17	TNA Sacrifice (2026)	March 27, 2026	Westwego, Louisiana	Alario Center	TBA	
(c) – refers to the champion(s) heading into the match
