= TNA Sacrifice (2009) =

2009 Total Nonstop Action Wrestling pay-per-view event

Sacrifice (2009)
- Promotional poster featuring A.J. Styles, parodying the video game Gears of War.
- Promotion: Total Nonstop Action Wrestling
- Date: May 24, 2009
- City: Orlando, Florida
- Venue: TNA Impact! Zone
- Attendance: 1,100

Pay-per-view chronology
← Previous; Lockdown	Next → Slammiversary

Sacrifice chronology
← Previous; 2008	Next → 2010

The 2009 Sacrifice was a professional wrestling pay-per-view (PPV) event produced by Total Nonstop Action Wrestling (TNA), which took place on May 24, 2009 at the TNA Impact! Zone in Orlando, Florida. It was the fifth event under the Sacrifice chronology. There were eight matches on the card.

The show's main event was a Four Way Ultimate Sacrifice match, which pitted TNA World Heavyweight Champion, Mick Foley, against Sting, Kurt Angle, and Jeff Jarrett with each participant wagering an important aspect of their career: Foley's title, Sting's career, Angle's leadership of the Main Event Mafia, and Jarrett's shares in the company. The match was ultimately won by Sting, who pinned Angle, thus winning leadership of the Main Event Mafia.

There were two other high-profile matches with A.J. Styles defending the TNA Legends Championship against Booker T in an "I Quit" match as well as Beer Money, Inc. winning the "Team 3D Invitational Tag Team Tournament" against The British Invasion. Other matches on the undercard included: a six-man tag team match between the team of Jay Lethal, Consequences Creed, and Eric Young versus the Motor City Machineguns and Sheik Abdul Bashir, Daffney versus Taylor Wilde in a Monster's Ball match, Christopher Daniels challenging Suicide for his TNA X Division Championship, Angelina Love defending her title against Awesome Kong, and Samoa Joe versus Kevin Nash.

In October 2017, with the launch of the Global Wrestling Network, the event became available to stream on demand.

== Storylines ==
Sacrifice featured eight professional wrestling matches and one pre-show match that involved different wrestlers from pre-existing scripted feuds and storylines. Wrestlers portrayed villains, heroes, or less distinguishable characters in the scripted events that built tension and culminated in a wrestling match or series of matches.

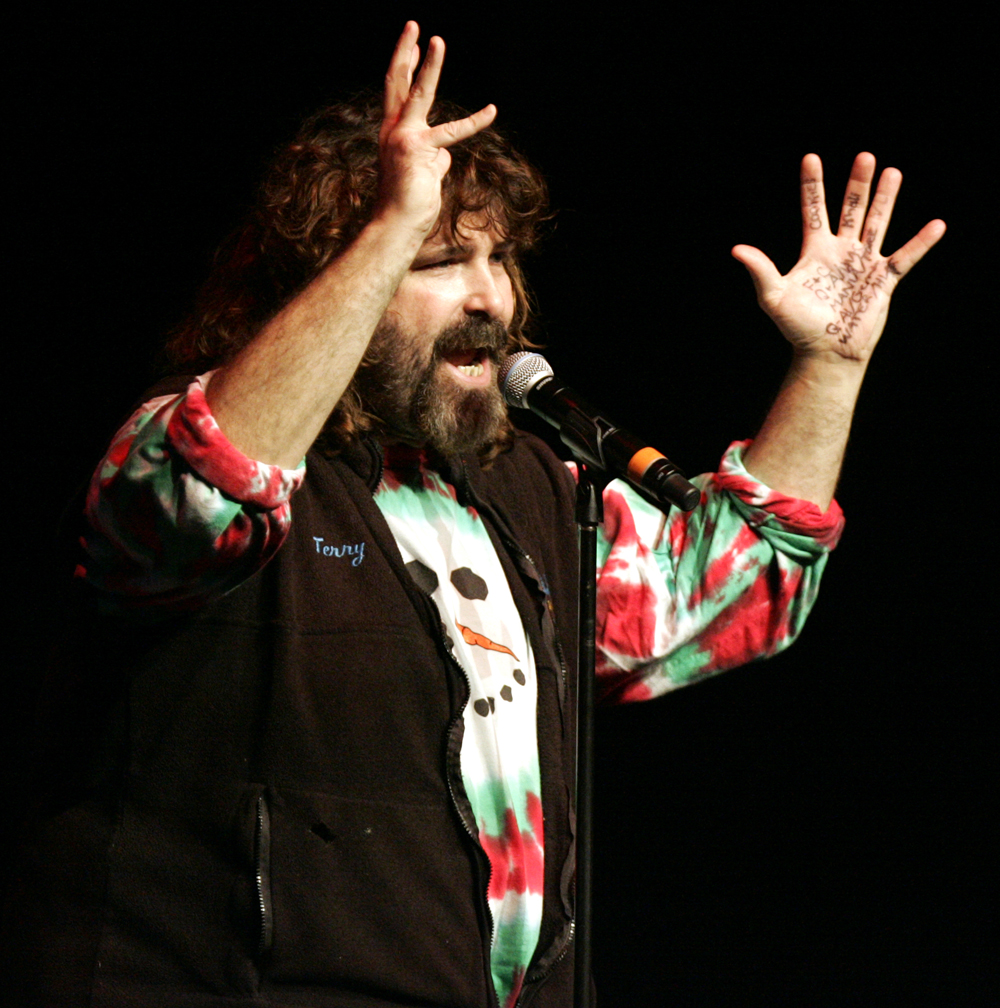
Mick Foley, TNA World Heavyweight Champion and competitor in the main event match

The four-way match for the TNA World Heavyweight Championship, entitled the "Ultimate Sacrifice" match, was announced on the April 23 episode of TNA's primary television program, TNA Impact!, by TNA co-founder Jeff Jarrett. The theme of the match being that each participant must risk something valuable, and if they were pinned or made to submit during the match, they would lose what they wagered. Mick Foley would wager the TNA World Heavyweight Championship, Kurt Angle would risk his leadership of the villainous alliance The Main Event Mafia, Sting would retire from wrestling, and Jarrett would wager his voting shares within the company, thus putting up his authority.

Another storyline heading into Sacrifice was between A.J. Styles and Booker T. At Destination X, Styles won the TNA Legends Championship from Booker, intensifying their rivalry. On the April 30 edition of Impact!, one final confrontation between the two led to TNA management scheduling Styles to defend his title in an "I Quit" match against Booker T; this match requires the two wrestlers to fight until one wrestler says, "I Quit".

The main rivalry from the women's division was between Angelina Love and Awesome Kong. At Lockdown, Love won the TNA Women's Knockout Championship from Kong in a three-way match by pinning Taylor Wilde. On the April 30 and May 7 editions of Impact!, Kong defeated Love's associates in her group, The Beautiful People, Madison Rayne and Velvet Sky (and later Love's manager, Cute Kip) in stretcher matches.

In the tag team division, current IWGP Tag Team and TNA World Tag Team Champions, Team 3D (Brother Ray and Brother Devon), announced the Team 3D Invitational Tag Team Tournament. The tournament would be an eight-team, three-round single-elimination tournament with the winning team receiving a trophy, a check for $100,000, and a shot at the TNA World Tag Team Championship. On the May 7 edition of Impact!, in the semifinals, James Storm and Robert Roode, also known as Beer Money, Inc., advanced to the finals by defeating Eric Young and Jethro Holliday. The following week of Impact had Doug Williams and Brutus Magnus (collectively known as The British Invasion) advancing to the finals after defeating Suicide and Amazing Red.

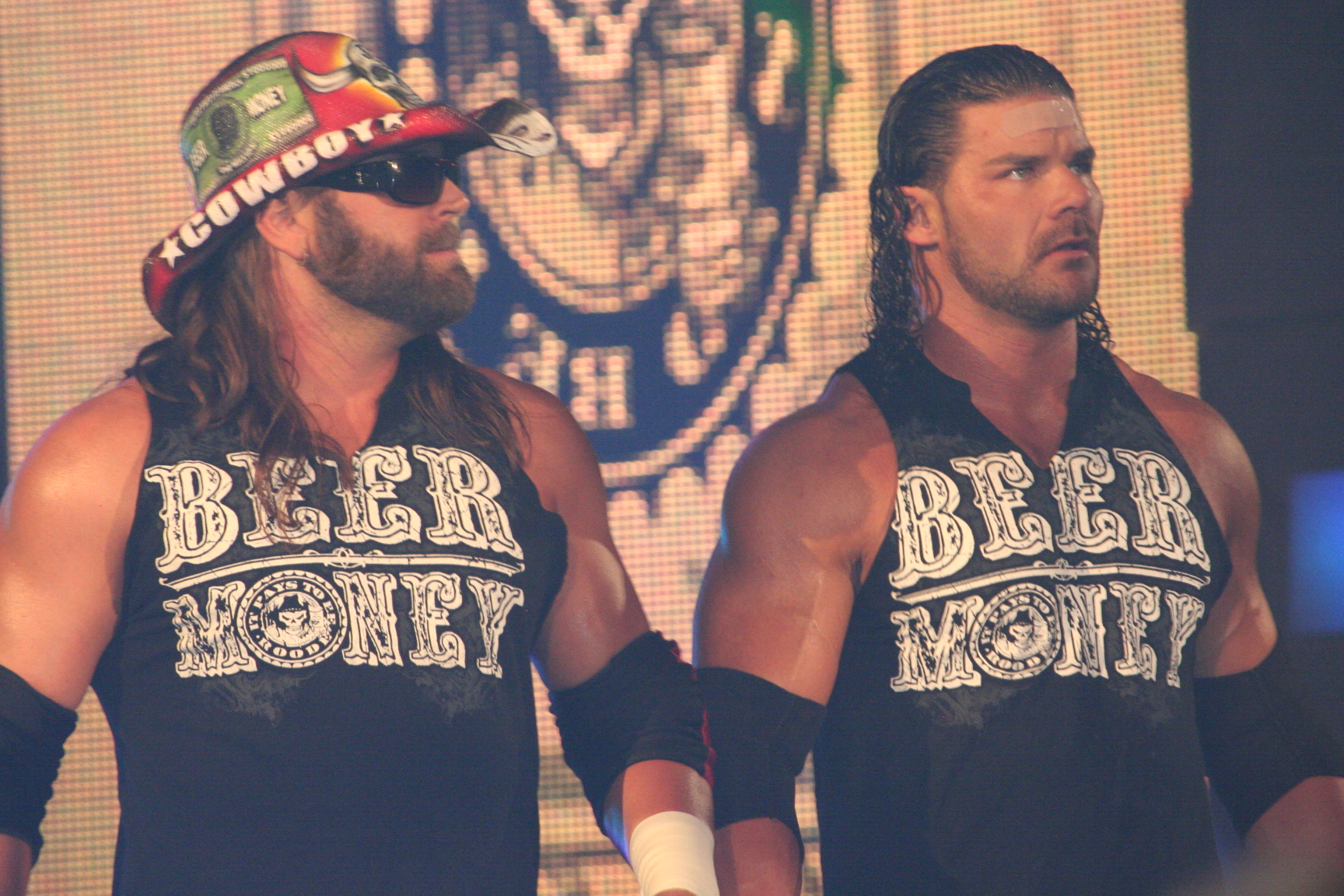
Beer Money, Inc. (Robert Roode and James Storm), winners of the "Team 3D Invitational Tag Team Tournament"

== Event ==
Other on-screen personnel
Role:	Name:
Commentator	Mike Tenay
Commentator	Don West
Interviewer	Jeremy Borash
Interviewer	Lauren Thompson
Ring announcer	Jeremy Borash
Ring announcer	David Penzer
Referee	Earl Hebner
Referee	Rudy Charles
Referee	Mark Johnson
Referee	Andrew Thomas

=== Pre-show ===
Before the show was broadcast live, a match aired on TNA's web site and for free on television, which pitted Amazing Red against Kiyoshi. Red won the match by pinfall after performing a standing shooting star press.

=== Preliminary matches ===
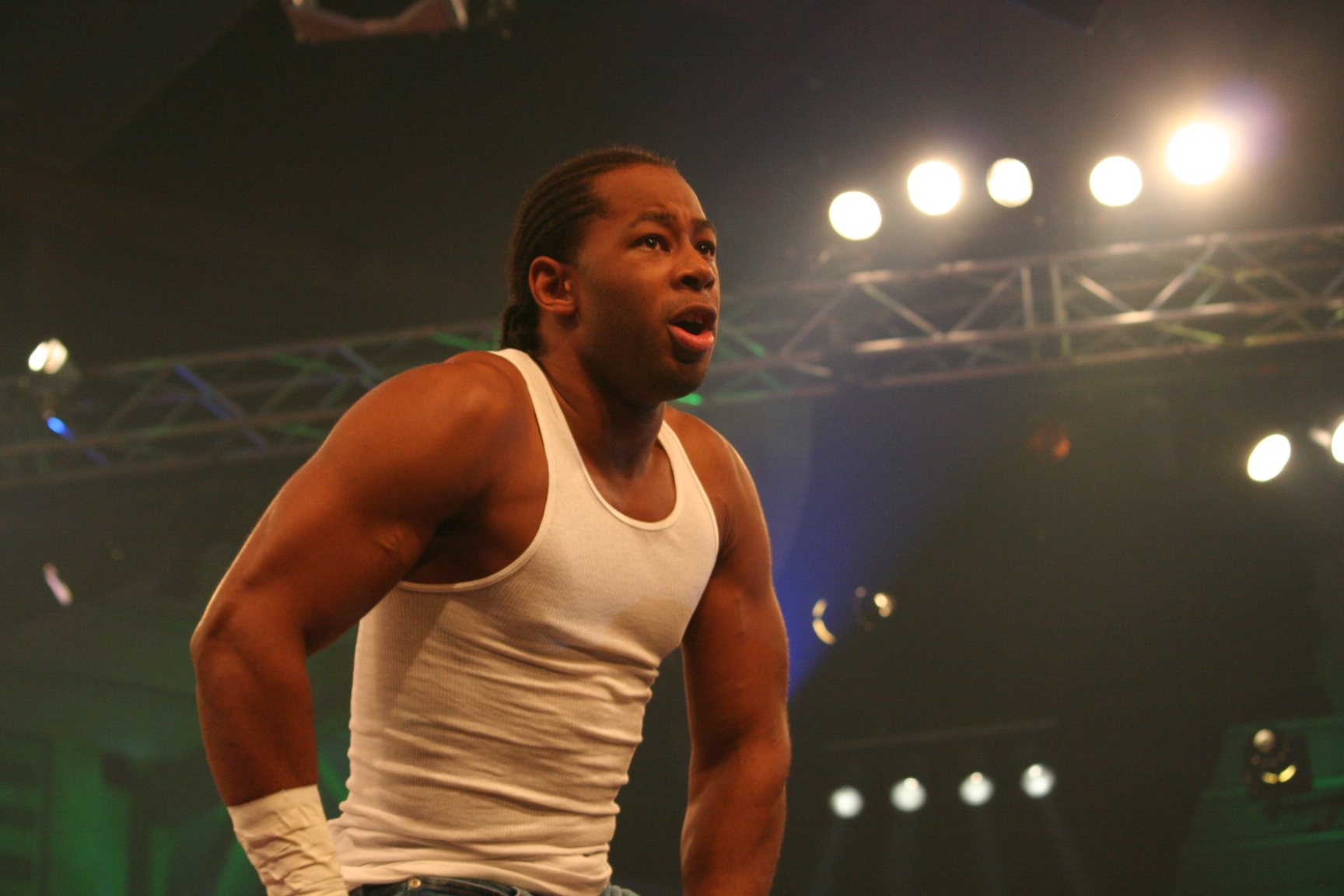
Jay Lethal, competitor in the X Division Six-Man Tag Team match to open the show

The first match on the show was a X Division Six-Man Tag Team match between the team of Eric Young and Lethal Consequences (Jay Lethal and Consequences Creed) against The Motor City Machine Guns (Chris Sabin and Alex Shelley) and Sheik Abdul Bashir. At the end of the match, Lethal was able to get the win for his team by pinning Bashir with a sunset flip.

The next match was the Monster's Ball match between Taylor Wilde and Daffney (with Abyss in her corner). Both women exchanged weapons shots before Wilde was able to get a pinfall victory over Daffney after using a fireman's carry takeover to throw Daffney onto a trash can. Following the match, Abyss' storyline therapist, Dr. Stevie, came down to the ring with a bag filled with thumbtacks and demanded Abyss to throw Wilde onto the contents of the bag that were spilled onto the mat. After some influence from Lauren, an interviewer for TNA with personal ties to both Wilde and Abyss, he turned on Stevie by chokeslamming him onto the thumbtacks.

Daniels challenged Suicide for the TNA X Division Championship after he saved Suicide from an attack a week prior on Impact! by the Motor City Machineguns. During their match, the Motor City Machineguns, who were determined to reveal the identity of Suicide, attacked him before fleeing the ring. Daniels did not realize the attack had occurred and pinned his opponent. Once he saw a replay, he refused to accept the title under the circumstances. He requested the match continue, adding five minutes, which expired, leading to Suicide retaining the title.

Following was a second title match for the TNA Women's Knockout Championship, which pitted Angelina Love, the champion, against Awesome Kong. During the match, Love repeatedly ran from Kong before being blocked by Kong's manager, Raisha Saeed. Kong took the opportunity beat down on her opponent before the referee was distracted. Love then grabbed a can of hair spray and sprayed it into Kong's eyes and capitalized on her opponent's compromised state by executing a roll up-style cover to get the pinfall victory. Following the match, Kong recovered from the attack and performed her signature drop, the Implant Buster, driving Love's face into the mat, before the leaving the ring.

Next was the match between Samoa Joe and Kevin Nash. Joe won the match by applying a choke with a half nelson hold. After the victory, he continued to beat on Nash with elbow strikes before several officials came to the ring to break them up.

=== Main event matches ===
The finals for the "Team 3D Invitational Tag Team Tournament" was the first of the main event matches, and Beer Money, Inc. was wrestling against The British Invasion (Brutus Magnus and Doug Williams). Storm performed a headscissors takedown from the top rope on Williams followed by a top rope body press by Roode to his downed opponent. Roode pinned Williams to with the match for Beer Money, Inc. after the latter was hit in the face with one of the briefcases that The British Invasion had recently commandeered.

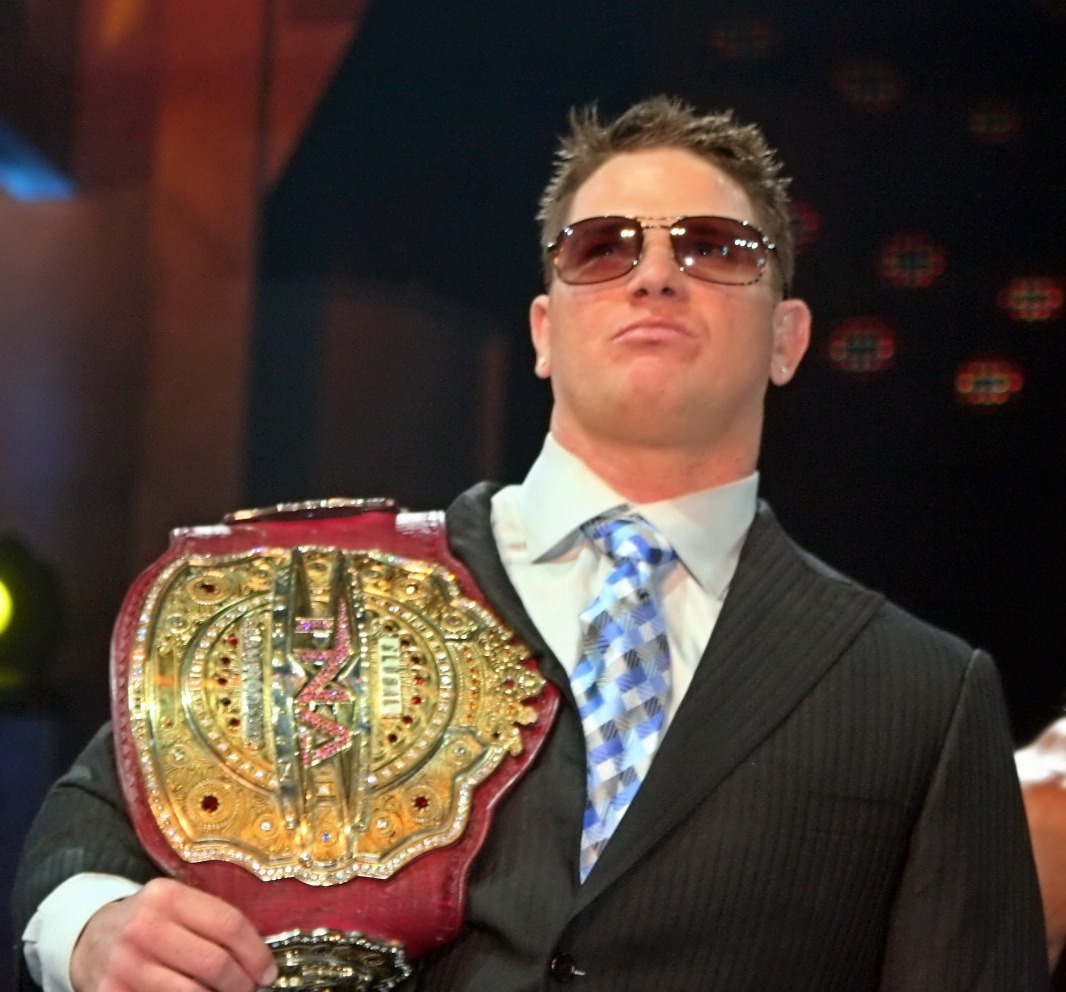
A.J. Styles, TNA Legends Champion

Following this match was the "I Quit" match for the TNA Legends Championship between A.J. Styles and Booker T with his wife, Sharmell, in his corner. At the beginning of the match, Booker took Styles to the outside of the ring, dropping him throat-first onto the guardrail; every time the referee gave him the microphone, a way for the wrestler to say, "I quit", Styles would not speak. Styles reversed the momentum with a backflip kick, called the Pelé Kick, to Booker's face. For the finish to the match, Styles locked in an armbar on Booker whilst in mid-air; Booker's reluctant ally in the Main Event Mafia, Jenna Morasca, came to the ring and threw a towel in the ring, signifying Booker's concession.

The TNA World Heavyweight Championship match between defending champion Mick Foley, Kurt Angle, Jeff Jarrett, and Sting was next. The match quickly turned into a brawl on the outside of the ring and the entrance ramp. During the match, Foley decided to take a rest and started doing commentary while all three of his opponents continued to wrestle. Fellow members of the Main Event Mafia, Angle and Sting, double teamed Jarrett before a communications breakdown, leading to the two fighting each other. After Sting was taken down, Angle turned his attention to Foley at the announcers table, diving onto him. Foley returned to the ring and stuffed a dirty old sock into the mouths of both Sting and Jarrett, attempting a dual submission. The match ended when Jarrett dropped Angle from the second turnbuckle with his finishing maneuver, the Stroke, onto a chair. Meanwhile, Sting sneaked into the ring and pinned Angle, winning the match. As a result of the pre-match stipulation, Sting became the leader of the Main Event Mafia.

== Aftermath ==
With Sting as the new leader of the Main Event Mafia, he immediately made some changes to the line up of the organization. Sharmell and Jenna Morasca were banned and Kurt Angle's bodyguards were fired.

Upon winning the "Team 3D Invitational Tag Team Tournament", Team 3D met with Beer Money, Inc. on the May 29 edition of Impact!. Robert Roode and James Storm received their check for $100,000 and trophies for winning the tournament. It was subsequently announced that the match guaranteed to the winners for the TNA World Tag Team Championship would take place at TNA's seventh anniversary event, Slammiversary.

The TNA World Heavyweight Champion Mick Foley's was simultaneously also the winner of the last King of the Mountain match, which he also had to defend. He began lobbying to only have to defend his title once a year.

Continuing their quest to reveal the identity of Suicide, The Motor City Machine Guns and Lethal Consequences assaulted Suicide again in the coming weeks. It was announced on the June 4 edition of Impact! that all five men would compete in another King of the Mountain match at Slammiversary.

=== Reception ===
The show was given positive feedback from critics. Dave Meltzer, writer of the professional wrestling periodical, The Wrestling Observer Newsletter, said multiple times in his pay-per-view report for the show that it, "overachieved", and he gave special attention to the "Team 3D Invitational Tag Team Tournament" finals and the "I quit" match. The only form of criticism he gave the show were some of the illogical booking tactics made by the company. The Pro Wrestling Torch reporter, James Caldwell, gave the show a generally good review, but also criticized the show in a number of spots, specifically the "I quit" match: "Best match of the PPV until the finish with Sharmell-Jenna continuing their feud on PPV TV. Keep it on free TV (if TNA is so adamant about continuing this), but don't put that dumb storyline on pay TV. As usual, TNA tries to find a way out of a stipulation. Sucks to rant on that, because the match was awesome and one of Booker's best performances in years."

A common theme amongst the criticism was the "lack of common sense", as wrestling journalist, Ben Miller, put it. He made particular mention to the World title match, by saying, "...there was no reason for Jarrett, Angle or Foley to attempt to beat Sting. You can win a championship, control of the company, leadership of a powerful faction or... what? If you end Sting’s career do you become six-time WCW World Heavyweight Champion. There is, of course, the argument that by pinning Sting you eliminate a potential rival. I don’t think the crowd bought that argument. The heat was spotty during the match and the lack of a sensible reason for attacking Sting appeared to be a big part of it. TNA Sacrifice 2009 felt flat, but it shouldn’t have. Most everyone worked hard, some angles paid off and some angles left fans intrigued. Those three ingredients usually make for a good show. Instead, one-third of the matches had conceptual problems...".

== Results ==
No.	Results	Stipulations	Times
1^{P}	Amazing Red defeated Kiyoshi	Singles match	07:02
2	Eric Young and Lethal Consequences (Consequences Creed and Jay Lethal) defeated The Motor City Machine Guns (Alex Shelley and Chris Sabin) and Sheik Abdul Bashir	X Division Six-man tag team match	13:54
3	Taylor Wilde defeated Daffney (with Abyss)	Monster's Ball match	03:33
4	Suicide (c) vs. Daniels ended in a draw	Singles match for the TNA X Division Championship	17:06
5	Angelina Love (c) defeated Awesome Kong (with Raisha Saeed)	Singles match for the TNA Women's Knockout Championship	05:56
6	Samoa Joe defeated Kevin Nash by submission	Singles match	08:01
7	Beer Money, Inc. (James Storm and Robert Roode) defeated The British Invasion (Brutus Magnus and Doug Williams) (with Rob Terry)	Finals in the Team 3D Invitational Tag Team Tournament	10:44
8	A.J. Styles (c) defeated Booker T	"I Quit" match for the TNA Legends Championship	14:56
9	Sting defeated Jeff Jarrett, Kurt Angle and Mick Foley	Four-Way Ultimate Sacrifice match (Note: The Ultimate Sacrifices were as follows: If Mick Foley was pinned, the person who pinned him would win the TNA World Heavyweight Championship.; If Kurt Angle was pinned, the person who pinned him would be the leader of the Main Event Mafia.; If Jeff Jarrett was pinned, the person who pinned him would gain control of TNA.; If Sting was pinned, he would retire from TNA.)	14:56
(c) / – the champion(s) heading into the match; P / – the match was broadcast on the pre-show

=== Tournament bracket ===
Round 1
Suicide and Amazing Red
The Motor City Machine Guns (Chris Sabin and Alex Shelley)
The British Invasion (Brutus Magnus and Doug Williams)
The Latin American Xchange (Homicide and Hernandez)
Eric Young and Jethro Holliday
No Limit (Yujiro and Naito)
Beer Money, Inc. (Robert Roode and James Storm)
Lethal Consequences (Jay Lethal and Consequences Creed)

Semifinals
Suicide and Amazing Red
The British Invasion
Young and Holliday
Beer Money Inc.

Finals
British Invasion
Beer Money Inc.
