= TNA Sacrifice (2016) =

Sacrifice (2016)
- Promotion: Total Nonstop Action Wrestling
- Date: March 19, 2016 (taped); April 26, 2016 (aired)
- City: Orlando, Florida
- Venue: Impact Zone
- Attendance: 1,100
- Tagline: Free on Pop TV

Sacrifice chronology
← Previous; 2014	Next → 2020

Impact Wrestling special episodes chronology
← Previous; Lockdown	Next → May Mayhem

The 2016 Sacrifice (also known as Impact Wrestling: Sacrifice) was a professional wrestling television special produced by Total Nonstop Action Wrestling (TNA), which took place on March 19, 2016 at the Impact Zone in Orlando, Florida and aired on Pop on April 26, 2016. It was the tenth event under the Sacrifice chronology. Unlike the previous events, this event was not included on pay-per-view (PPV) and instead, was featured as a special edition of TNA's weekly broadcast of Impact Wrestling on Pop TV. It was also the final Sacrifice event promoted under the TNA name until 2024.

Five matches were contested at the event. The main event was a no disqualification match between Ethan Carter III and Mike Bennett, which Bennett won. In other prominent matches on the undercard, Bram defeated Eric Young in a falls count anywhere match to win the King of the Mountain Championship and Decay (Crazzy Steve and Abyss) defeated Beer Money, Inc. (Bobby Roode and James Storm) to win the World Tag Team Championship while Drew Galloway retained the World Heavyweight Championship against Tyrus.

The event notably featured the last matches of longtime TNA veterans Bobby Roode and Eric Young for the promotion who lost their respective titles at the event and also marked the first loss of Ethan Carter III, thus marking the end of his undefeated streak in TNA.

== Storylines ==
TNA Impact Sacrifice 2016 featured five different professional wrestling matches that involved different wrestlers from pre-existing scripted feuds and storylines. Wrestlers were portrayed as either villains or heroes in the scripted events that built tension and culminated in a wrestling match involving.

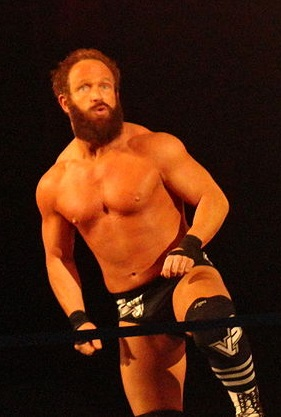
Eric Young wrestled his last match in TNA at Sacrifice and was the defending King of the Mountain Champion heading into the event.

On the January 26 episode of Impact Wrestling, Bram formed an alliance with Eric Young. On the April 12 episode of Impact Wrestling, Bram and Young failed to win the World Tag Team Championship from Beer Money, Inc. in a four-way match also involving The BroMans and Decay after Young accidentally hit Bram. The following week, on Impact Wrestling, Young insulted the fans and vowed to leave TNA with his King of the Mountain Championship and ordered Bram to leave with him but Bram refused and said that he would no longer be Young's lackey and the title belt would look better around Bram's waist, which led to Young attacking him and ending their alliance, which set up a match between Bram and Young for the King of the Mountain Championship at Sacrifice.

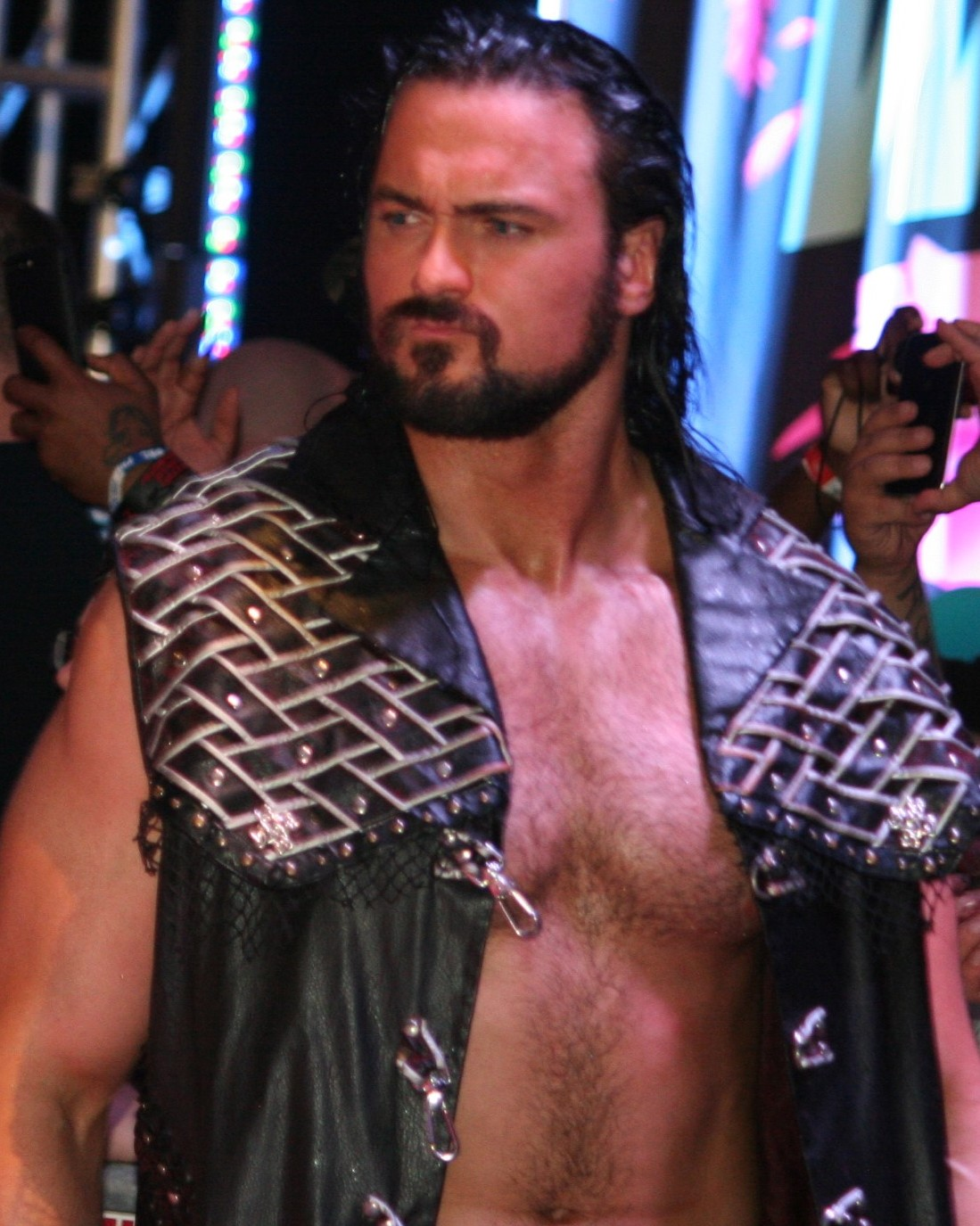
Drew Galloway was the defending TNA World Heavyweight Champion heading into Sacrifice.

On the March 15 episode of Impact Wrestling, Mike Bennett attacked Ethan Carter III during his three-way match against Matt Hardy and Jeff Hardy for the World Heavyweight Championship, thus costing EC3, the title. The following week, on Impact Wrestling, EC3 eliminated Bennett from a gauntlet match to determine the #1 contender for the title and then Bennett interfered, causing EC3's elimination.> Bennett would wrestle EC3 on numerous occasions over the following weeks, which set up a no disqualification match between the two at Sacrifice.

On the March 15 episode of Impact Wrestling, Decay attacked The Wolves member Eddie Edwards, on which the World Tag Team Champions Beer Money, Inc. confronted Decay. This led to several matches between the two teams over the following weeks. On the April 19 episode of Impact Wrestling, Decay member Rosemary attacked Gail Kim during a ladder match and then kidnapped her and held her hostage throughout the show before bringing her to the ring where Abyss threatened to Beer Money that Rosemary would snap Gail's neck if Beer Money did not give Abyss and Crazzy Steve, a title shot at the World Tag Team Championship and Decay demanded a Valley of Shadows match for the title at Sacrifice, which Beer Money accepted.

On the April 5 episode of Impact Wrestling, Tyrus confronted Drew Galloway and hinted that he wanted a shot at Galloway's World Heavyweight Championship, just like Galloway cashed in his Feast or Fired briefcase for a title shot and Tyrus had won the Bound for Gold at the 2015 Bound for Glory, so he would be cashing in the title as well. On the April 12 episode of Impact Wrestling, Tyrus and Matt Hardy defeated Galloway and Jeff Hardy in a tag team match, during which Galloway and Tyrus brawled with each other and then Galloway was injured by Bobby Lashley after the match. On the April 19 episode of Impact Wrestling, Tyrus declared his intention to cash in his Bound for Gold opportunity against Galloway, which Galloway accepted for next week, when he would be perfectly fine to wrestle and then Tyrus attacked McIntyre, setting up their title match for the World Heavyweight Championship at Sacrifice.

== Event ==
=== Preliminary matches ===
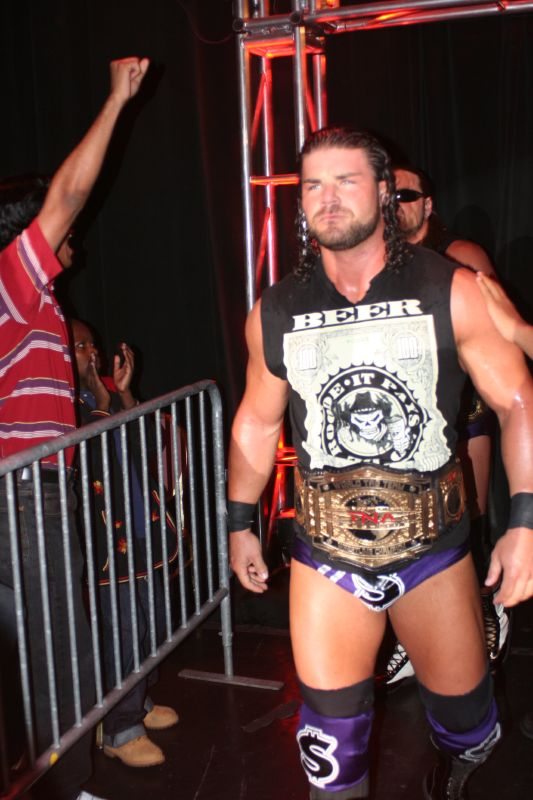
Bobby Roode wrestled his last TNA match at Sacrifice as one half of the defending World Tag Team Champions.

The event kicked off with Tyrus demanding a title shot for the World Heavyweight Championship against Drew Galloway, who accepted the challenge to begin the match. Tyrus dominated much of the match by taking advantage of Galloway's rib injury but Galloway managed to hit a superplex and a Future Shock to retain the title.

This was followed by the new Knockouts Commissioner Maria Kanellis cutting a promo about rebuilding the Knockouts division but was interrupted by Gail Kim and Kanellis then put Kim in a match against Rosemary. An interference by Crazzy Steve and a distraction by Kanellis allowed Rosemary to hit a fireman's carry facebuster to Kim for the win.

It was followed by the debut of Eli Drake's new interview segment "Fact of Life", in which he called Jeff Hardy, Drew Galloway and his guests The BroMans dummies.

Later, Beer Money, Inc. (Bobby Roode and James Storm) defended the World Tag Team Championship against Decay (Abyss and Crazzy Steve) in a Valley of Shadows match. After Steve knocked Storm off the top rope, Rosemary hit a low blow to Roode and Abyss chokeslammed him onto the thumbtacks to win the title.

In the penultimate match, Eric Young defended the King of the Mountain Championship against Bram in a falls count anywhere match. The two brawled throughout the arena during the match. Near the end of the match, Bram hit a low blow to Young on the apron and nailed a Brighter Side of Suffering off the apron through a table at ringside to win the title.

The match was followed by a segment, in which Jeff Hardy discussed the incidents of his "I Quit" match with Matt Hardy the previous week until he was confronted by Rockstar Spud and Reby Sky, during which Spud attacked Hardy but Hardy countered by hitting a Twist of Fate to Spud.

=== Main event match ===
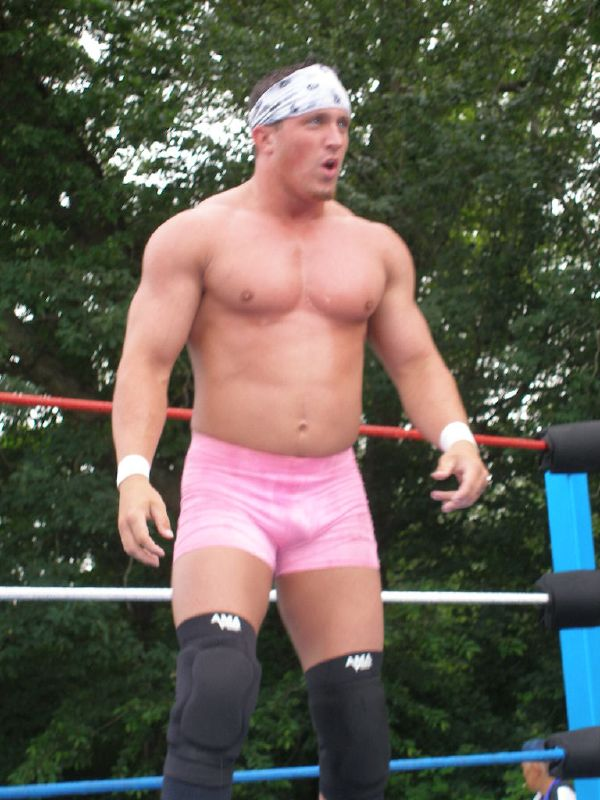
Mike Bennett ended Ethan Carter III's undefeated streak in TNA by defeating him in the no disqualification main event of Sacrifice.

The main event was a no disqualification match pitting Ethan Carter III against Mike Bennett. Near the end of the match, EC3 hit a One Percenter to Bennett but Bennett's wife Maria Kanellis interfered in the match and prevented the referee from counting the pinfall, which led to EC3 repeatedly hitting Bennett with a chair and then applied a cobra clutch on Bennett, who kicked off the corner and pinned EC3 for the win, thus ending EC3's undefeated streak in TNA by handing him his first pinfall loss.

== Reception ==
Sacrifice received mixed reviews from critics. Jason Powell of Pro Wrestling Dot Net said that the event "closed on a high note" and praised most of the matches while criticizing the Fact of Life segment, the Falls Count Anywhere match and the Valley of Shadows match.

Larry Csonka of 411Mania rated it 6.0, considering it "another overall fine show from TNA, playing off of the previous week’s show well enough and changing the titles they needed to with the departures of (Bobby) Roode and (Eric) Young." He criticized most of the show, with the exception of the Fact of Life segment.

According to Garrett Kidney of Voices of Wrestling, the event was among the "long string of solid enjoyable Impacts that rarely rise above good but are pretty much never bad."

Graham Matthews of Next Era Wrestling criticized the inclusion of three hardcore matches into Sacrifice due to it being the theme of Hardcore Justice event but considered it "an entertaining edition of Impact Wrestling on the whole".

== Aftermath ==
Sacrifice marked the last appearance of both Bobby Roode and Eric Young in TNA, who left the promotion after the event. Both men would go on to join WWE as members of NXT. Young would return to TNA in 2020.

Ethan Carter III demanded a rematch from Mike Bennett on the May 10 episode of Impact Wrestling, which Bennett accepted on the condition that EC3 must win three of his matches. EC3 would go on to win the matches, a steel cage match against Rockstar Spud, a last man standing match against Tyrus and a singles match against Matt Hardy by disqualification. As a result of EC3's disqualification win over Hardy, Bennett refused to give EC3 a rematch. However, on the May 31 episode of Impact Wrestling, EC3 was made in charge of the show and made a match official between Bennett and himself at Slammiversary.

== Results ==
No.	Results	Stipulations	Times
1	Drew Galloway (c) defeated Tyrus	Singles match for the TNA World Heavyweight Championship	07:55
2	Rosemary defeated Gail Kim	Singles match	06:11
3	Decay (Crazzy Steve and Abyss) (with Rosemary) defeated Beer Money, Inc. (Bobby Roode and James Storm) (c)	Valley of Shadows match for the TNA World Tag Team Championship	15:13
4	Bram defeated Eric Young (c)	Falls Count Anywhere match for the TNA King of the Mountain Championship	06:29
5	Mike Bennett defeated Ethan Carter III	No Disqualification match	11:08
(c) / – the champion(s) heading into the match
