= Impact Wrestling Sacrifice (2020) =

2020 wrestling event

- Promotional poster featuring Tessa Blanchard, Moose, Ace Austin, and Rhino
- Promotion(s): Impact Wrestling; Ohio Valley Wrestling
- Date: February 22, 2020
- City: Louisville, Kentucky
- Venue: Davis Arena

Impact Plus Monthly Specials chronology
| ← Previous; Bash at the Brewery 2 | Next → Lockdown (cancelled) |

Sacrifice chronology
| ← Previous; 2016 | Next → 2021 |

The 2020 Sacrifice was a professional wrestling livestreaming event produced by Impact Wrestling in conjunction with Ohio Valley Wrestling. The event took place on February 22, 2020, at the Davis Arena in Louisville, Kentucky and aired on Impact Plus. It was the eleventh event in the Sacrifice chronology and the first to be held as an Impact Plus Monthly Special.

== Production ==
=== Background ===
After the conclusion of the Hard to Kill pay-per-view event, Impact Wrestling announced that it was forming a partnership with Ohio Valley Wrestling to revive their former pay-per-view event Sacrifice as a monthly special for Impact Plus, with the event taking place on February 22, 2020, at the Davis Arena in Louisville, Kentucky. Sacrifice was previously held as a pay-per-view event by the promotion then known as Total Nonstop Action Wrestling (TNA) from 2005 and 2014 and then it was discontinued in favor of the monthly pre-taped One Night Only events. TNA once held Sacrifice as a special episode of Impact Wrestling in 2016.

=== Storylines ===
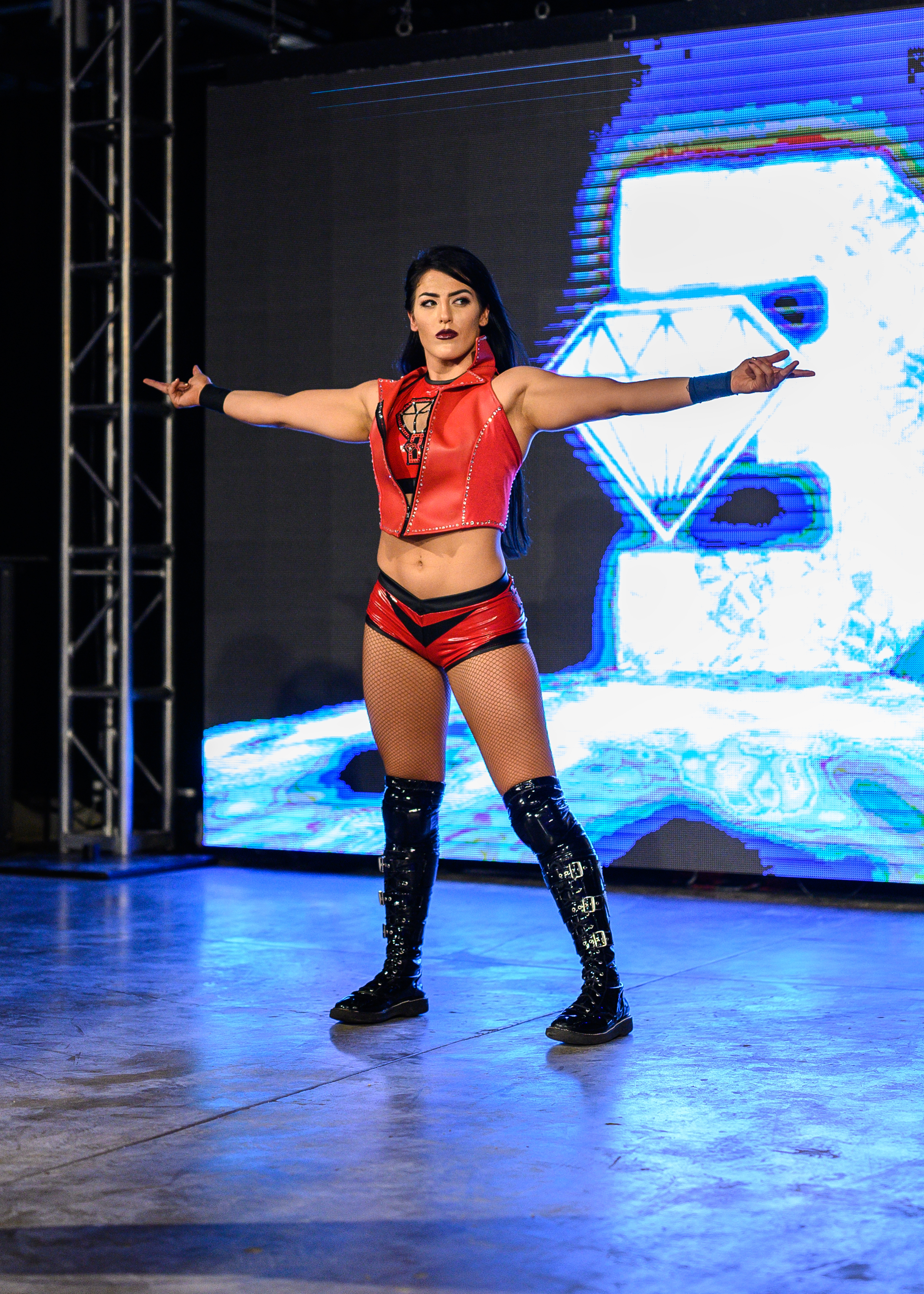
Tessa Blanchard was the Impact World Champion heading into the main event of Sacrifice.

The event featured professional wrestling matches that involve different wrestlers from pre-existing scripted feuds and storylines. Wrestlers portrayed villains, heroes, or less distinguishable characters in the scripted events that built tension and culminated in a wrestling match or series of matches played out on Impact's weekly television program.

On January 23, Impact Wrestling announced the first match for Sacrifice on Twitter to take place between Daga and Jake Crist. On the January 28 episode of Impact, Daga and Dr. Wagner, Jr. defeated Reno Scum in a tag team match and then Ohio Versus Everything (Dave Crist, Jake Crist and Madman Fulton) attacked Daga and Wagner after the match. The following week, on Impact, Daga and Wagner defeated Dave and Jake in a tag team match when Daga scored the pinfall on Dave.

At Hard to Kill, Tessa Blanchard defeated Sami Callihan to win the Impact World Championship in the main event. On the January 21 episode of Impact, Blanchard cut her first live promo after her title win but was interrupted and attacked by the X Division Champion Ace Austin and the Knockouts Champion Taya Valkyrie, which led to Austin's Hard to Kill opponent Trey making the save for her. Blanchard and Miguel would lose a mixed tag team match to Austin and Valkyrie later that night. The following week, on Impact, Austin noted that he had beaten Tessa twice, first in a ladder match to win the X Division Championship at the 2019 Bound for Glory and secondly in the aforementioned mixed tag team match, thus setting up a champion vs. champion match between Blanchard and Austin as the main event of Sacrifice.

At Hard to Kill, Moose defeated Rhino in a no disqualification match. On the January 21 episode of Impact, Taurus defeated Moose and Rhino in a three-way match. Moose would then attack Rhino during Rhino's match with Taurus on the February 4 episode of Impact, thus setting up a match between Moose and Rhino at Sacrifice.

== Event ==
=== Preliminary matches ===
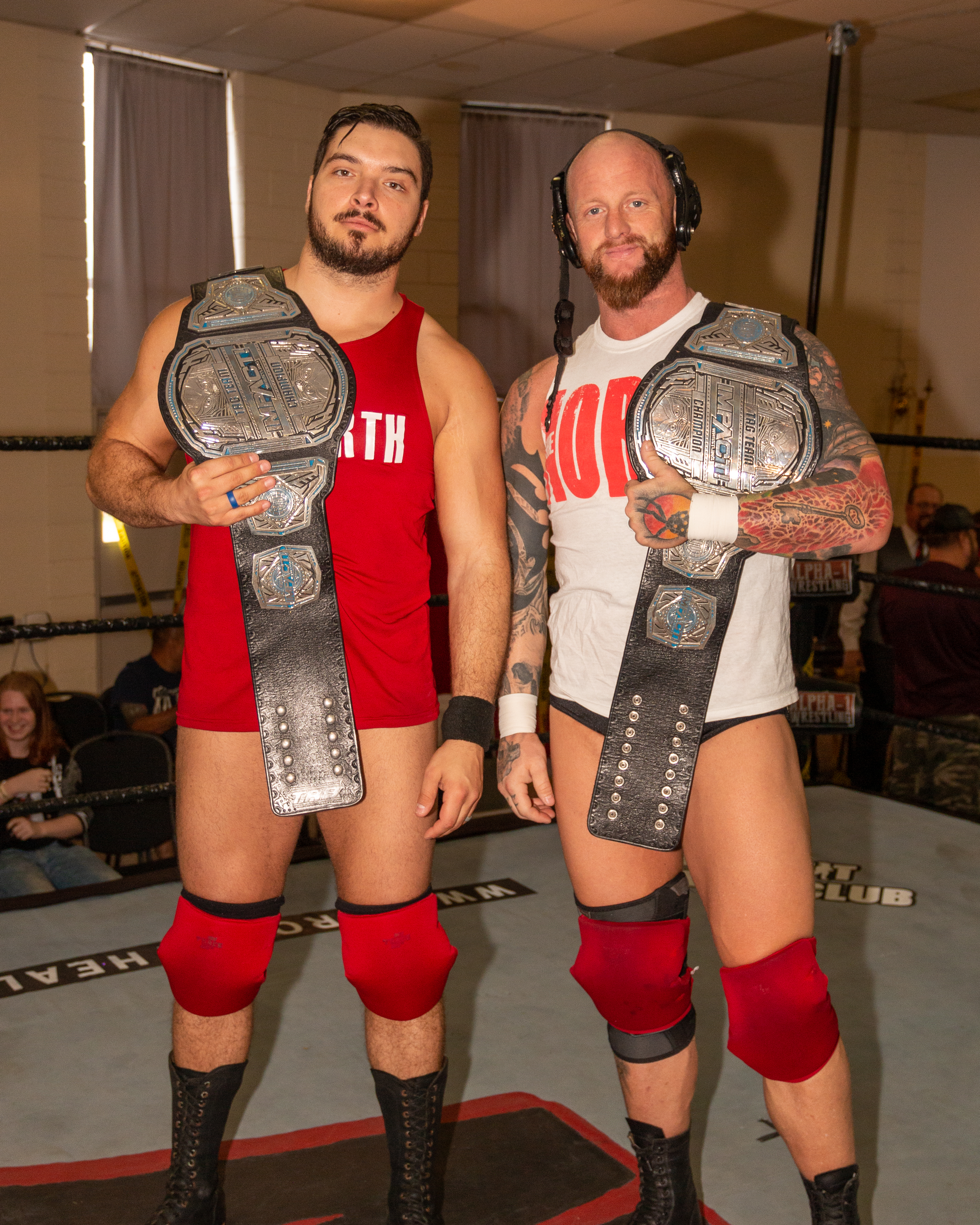
The North defended the World Tag Team Championship against The Rascalz at Sacrifice.

The opening match of the event featured Rohit Raju taking on Corey Storm. Rohit hit a double stomp on Storm for the win.

Next, The North (Ethan Page and Josh Alexander) defended the World Tag Team Championship against The Rascalz (Trey and Wentz). Rohit Raju interfered in the match by pushing Trey off the top rope, allowing North to hit an Argentine backbreaker and a spinebuster combination to retain the titles.

Next, Kiera Hogan took on Ray Lyn in a match, which Hogan won by executing a swinging neckbreaker.

Next, Willie Mack took on The Legacy Of Brutality unit member Jay Bradley from OVW. Bradley attacked Mack before the match to gain momentum. Near the climax of the match, Mack hit a stunner and a frog splash on Bradley for the win.

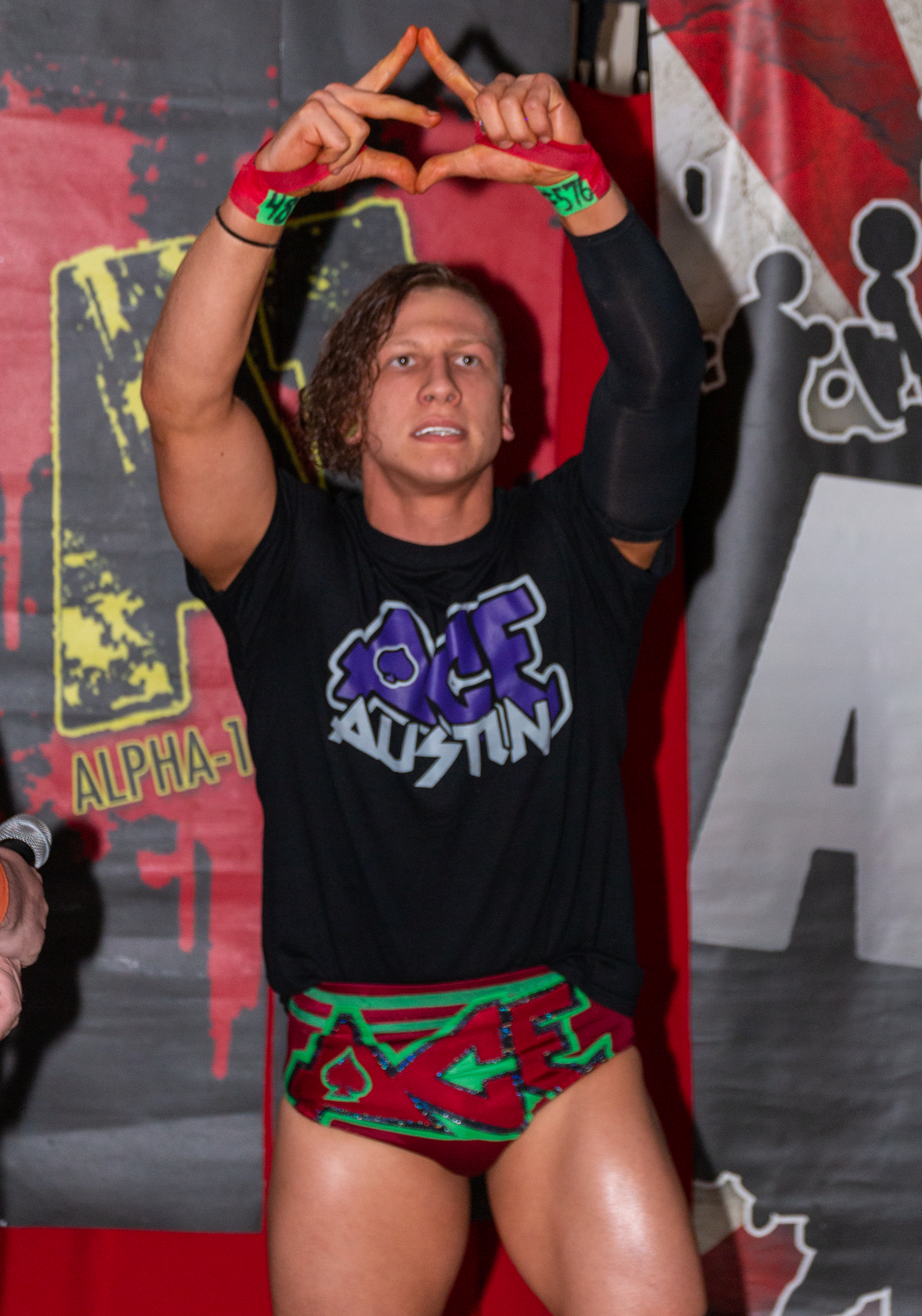
Ace Austin was the reigning X Division Champion heading into the event.

Next, oVe members Dave Crist and Madman Fulton took on Larry D and Acey Romero. Romero knocked out Fulton by diving on him outside the ring and then Larry hit Crist with a knockout punch and Romero hit a pounce to Crist for the win. After the match, Jake Crist helped Dave and Fulton in attacking Larry and Romero until Jake's scheduled opponent Daga made the save, leading to the match between Daga and Jake taking place immediately. Daga hit a double underhook gutbuster on Jake for the win.

Next, Joey Ryan took on Johnny Swinger. Swinger hit Ryan with a VHS tape consisting of Swinger's best matches but got a near-fall and then Ryan hit a Sweet Tooth Music to Swinger for the win.

Later, Jordynne Grace defended the Knockouts Championship against Havok. Grace applied a sleeper hold on Havok but Havok powered out of it but Grace then managed to apply a second sleeper hold and forced Havok to pass out to the hold to retain the title.

This was followed by the penultimate match between Rhino and Moose. Moose tried to retreat but Rhino attacked him and the two brawled him and then the action returned to the ring, where Moose hit a low blow to get disqualified. Rhino demanded the match to be restarted and it was restarted as a no disqualification match. Moose drove Rhino through a table with a No Jackhammer Needed to win the match.

=== Main event match ===
The main event was a champion vs. champion match pitting the World Champion Tessa Blanchard against the X Division Champion Ace Austin. Blanchard hit a hammerlock DDT on Austin from the top rope onto the mat for the win.

== Aftermath ==
Tessa Blanchard received a title shot against Ace Austin for the X Division Championship on the February 25 episode of Impact!, where Blanchard won by disqualification after Taya Valkyrie attacked her, resulting in Austin retaining his title as the title could not change hands on a disqualification.

Rohit Raju's attack on The Rascalz resulted in a match between Rohit and Wentz on the February 25 episode of Impact Wrestling, which Rohit won.

== Results ==
| No. | Results | Stipulations | Times |
|---|---|---|---|
| 1^{P} | AJ Daniels defeated D'Mone Solavino | Singles match | 05:23 |
| 2^{P} | Max the Impaler defeated Cali Young (with DL3) | Singles match | 04:14 |
| 3 | Rohit Raju defeated Corey Storm | Singles match | 06:30 |
| 4 | The North (Ethan Page and Josh Alexander) (c) defeated The Rascalz (Trey and Wentz) | Tag team match for the Impact World Tag Team Championship | 20:16 |
| 5 | Kiera Hogan defeated Ray Lyn | Singles match | 11:05 |
| 6 | Willie Mack defeated Jay Bradley | Singles match | 06:13 |
| 7 | Acey Romero and Larry D defeated Ohio Versus Everything (Dave Crist and Madman Fulton) (with Jake Crist) | Tag team match | 13:46 |
| 8 | Daga defeated Jake Crist | Singles match | 16:19 |
| 9 | Joey Ryan defeated Johnny Swinger | Singles match | 07:29 |
| 10 | Jordynne Grace (c) defeated Havok | Singles match for the Impact Knockouts Championship | 05:34 |
| 11 | Rhino defeated Moose by disqualification | Singles match | 02:26 |
| 12 | Moose defeated Rhino | No Disqualification match | 11:49 |
| 13 | Tessa Blanchard (World Champion) defeated Ace Austin (X Division Champion) | Non-title Champion vs. Champion match | 18:32 |
(c) / – the champion(s) heading into the match; P / – the match was broadcast on the pre-show
