= No Surrender (2022) =

2022 Impact Wrestling event

- Promotional poster featuring various Impact wrestlers
- Promotion: Impact Wrestling
- Date: February 19, 2022
- City: Westwego, Louisiana
- Venue: Alario Center
- Attendance: 500

Impact Plus Monthly Specials chronology
← Previous; Throwback Throwdown II	Next → Sacrifice

No Surrender chronology
← Previous; 2021	Next → 2023

The 2022 No Surrender was a professional wrestling event produced by Impact Wrestling. It took place on February 19, 2022, at the Alario Center in Westwego, Louisiana, and aired on Impact Plus and YouTube. It was the 14th event under the No Surrender chronology.

12 matches were contested at the event, including two on the pre-show and one taped as a digital exclusive. In the main event, Honor No More (Matt Taven, Mike Bennett, PCO, Vincent, and Kenny King) defeated Team Impact (Chris Sabin, Rhino, Rich Swann, Steve Maclin, and Willie Mack) in a 10-man tag team match. In other prominent matches, Moose defeated W. Morrissey to retain the Impact World Championship, Mickie James defeated Tasha Steelz to retain the Impact Knockouts World Championship, and The Good Brothers (Doc Gallows and Karl Anderson) defeated Guerrillas of Destiny (Tama Tonga and Tanga Loa) to retain the Impact World Tag Team Championship.

== Production ==
Other on-screen personnel
Commentators	Tom Hannifan
Commentators	Matthew Rehwoldt
Commentators	Brian Myers (Impact World Championship match)
Ring announcer	David Penzer
Referees	Brian Hebner
Referees	Brandon Tolle
Referees	Daniel Spencer
Interviewer	Gia Miller

=== Background ===
No Surrender is an annual professional wrestling event produced by Impact Wrestling. It was originally produced by Impact Wrestling (then known as Total Nonstop Action Wrestling), as a pay-per-view (PPV) event. The first one was held in July 2005, but when the PPV names were shuffled for 2006, it was moved to September. In December 2012, TNA announced that the event was canceled. The last event took place in the TNA Impact! Zone in September 2012. It was resumed as a special episode of Impact! between 2013 and 2015 and was then revived as an Impact Plus event in 2019.

On December 24, 2021, Impact Wrestling announced that No Surrender would take place at the Alario Center on February 19, 2022, in Westwego, Louisiana.

=== Storylines ===
The event featured several professional wrestling matches, which involve different wrestlers from pre-existing scripted feuds, plots, and storylines. Wrestlers portrayed heroes, villains, or less distinguishable characters in scripted events that build tension and culminate in a wrestling match or series of matches. Storylines were produced on Impact's weekly television program.

At Hard To Kill, Moose successfully defended the Impact World Championship against Matt Cardona and W. Morrissey in a three-way match, pinning Cardona to win. On the subsequent episode of Impact!, Morrissey, feeling slighted about how he had Moose pinned for more than a three-count but could not win due to a knocked out official, came out to the ring and demanded Moose give him a world title match. Moose would appear on the jumbotron, saying while he was defending the title later that night, it would be against someone who had not been given a world title match in their career; Moose's opponent would be revealed to be Zicky Dice, who Moose beat in a Squash match. After the match, Morrissey would confront Moose and ran him off. The following week on Impact!, after Morrissey won a handicap match against The Learning Tree (Zicky Dice and VSK), Impact Executive Vice President Scott D'Amore would grant Morrissey an Impact World Championship match against Moose at No Surrender.

At Hard To Kill, former Ring of Honor (ROH) stars Matt Taven, Mike Bennett, PCO, and Vincent invaded the event and attacked Eddie Edwards, Rich Swann, Willie Mack, Heath and Rhino, before being joined in the ring by Maria Kanellis-Bennett. On the January 13 episode of Impact!, they attacked color commentator D'Lo Brown. Later that night, Kanellis confronted Deonna Purrazzo, after the latter had defeated Rok-C in a title vs. title match to win the ROH Women's World Championship and retain her AAA Reina de Reinas Championship. Purrazzo's associate Matthew Rehwoldt would be attacked by Kanellis' associates after he tried to intervene. The following week on Impact!, the group bought tickets to see Jonathan Gresham defend the ROH World Championship against Steve Maclin. However, later that night, they attacked Josh Alexander after a match with Charlie Haas, before being run off by various Impact wrestlers to the balcony. In the aftermath, Kanellis formally announced the name of their unit, dubbing themselves "Honor No More". On the January 27 episode of Impact!, Scott D'Amore announced that Team Impact (Chris Sabin, Eddie Edwards, Josh Alexander, Rhino, and Rich Swann) will face Honor No More in a 10-man tag team match, with the stipulation that if Honor No More wins, the group will remain in Impact Wrestling; but if Team Impact wins, Honor No More will be gone. The following week on Impact!, Kenny King returned to Impact Wrestling and was added to the match as a member of Honor No More. On the February 10 episode of Impact!, Josh Alexander defeated the debuting Big Kon, but continued attacking him after the match and pushed away security guards and Impact EVP Scott D'Amore. This resulted in D'Amore sending Alexander home, thus, removing him from the match at No Surrender. Team Impact originally wanted Jonathan Gresham to take Alexander's spot, but Gresham was attacked backstage. Steve Maclin, who had also been a victim of Honor No More, volunteered to take his place.

At Hard To Kill, Tasha Steelz won the first-ever Knockouts Ultimate X match, where she became the number one contender to the Impact Knockouts World Championship. In the main event, champion Mickie James defeated Deonna Purrazzo in a Texas Deathmatch to retain her title. On the January 27 episode of Impact!, it was announced that James will defend the title against Steelz at No Surrender.

On the January 27 episode of Impact!, Bullet Club's Guerrillas of Destiny (Tama Tonga and Tanga Loa) would make their debut, attacking Jake Something after the latter's match with fellow Bullet Club member Chris Bey. Mike Bailey would try to save Something, only to be jumped from behind by Bullet Club leader Jay White. Guerrillas of Destiny would soon call out Impact World Tag Team Champions The Good Brothers (Doc Gallows and Karl Anderson), themselves former members of Bullet Club. The Good Brothers would seek assistance from their allies Violent By Design (Eric Young, Deaner, and Joe Doering) to deal with Bullet Club. The following week on Impact!, after Bullet Club defeated Something, Bailey, Ace Austin, and Madman Fulton; they would be attacked by The Good Brothers and Violent By Design. Two matches were since announced for No Surrender; Eric Young vs Jay White, and The Good Brothers defending their titles against Guerillas of Destiny.

On the January 27 episode of Impact!, after defeating Johnny Swinger, Jonah would encounter Decay (Black Taurus, Crazzy Steve, Rosemary, and Havok). The following week on Impact!, Jonah defeated Steve and stared down Taurus right after the match. On February 10, it was later announced that Taurus would face Jonah at No Surrender.

On the February 3 episode of Impact!, Matt Cardona defeated Jordynne Grace to win the Impact Digital Media Championship after hitting her with a steel chair. The following week on Impact!, Cardona explained his actions, saying that after being "screwed" out of the Impact World Championship at Hard To Kill, he needed "a change in attitude". It was later announced that Cardona will defend the Impact Digital Media Championship against Grace at No Surrender.

== Results ==
No.	Results	Stipulations	Times
1^{D}	Gisele Shaw defeated Alisha Edwards by pinfall	Singles match (Note: The match was taped for an Impact Digital Exclusive that aired on February 22.)	4:19
2^{P}	Trey Miguel defeated John Skyler by pinfall	Singles match	5:59
3^{P}	Havok (with Rosemary) defeated Tenille Dashwood (with Madison Rayne and Kaleb with a K) by pinfall	Singles match	4:37
4	Jake Something defeated Ace Austin (with Madman Fulton), Chris Bey, and Mike Bailey by pinfall	X Division Four-way match to determine the number one contender for the Impact X Division Championship at Sacrifice	7:19
5	Jonah defeated Black Taurus (with Crazzy Steve) by pinfall	Singles match	8:08
6	Jay White defeated Eric Young by pinfall	Singles match	12:12
7	Deonna Purrazzo (c) defeated Miranda Alize by submission	Singles match for the ROH Women's World Championship	7:26
8	Matt Cardona (c) defeated Jordynne Grace by disqualification	Intergender match for the Impact Digital Media Championship	7:58
9	The Good Brothers (Doc Gallows and Karl Anderson) (c) defeated Guerrillas of Destiny (Tama Tonga and Tanga Loa) by pinfall	Tag team match for the Impact World Tag Team Championship	12:19
10	Mickie James (c) defeated Tasha Steelz (with Savannah Evans) by pinfall	Singles match for the Impact Knockouts World Championship	10:28
11	Moose (c) defeated W. Morrissey by pinfall	Singles match for the Impact World Championship	12:21
12	Honor No More (Matt Taven, Mike Bennett, PCO, Vincent, and Kenny King) (with Maria Kanellis-Bennett) defeated Team Impact (Chris Sabin, Rhino, Rich Swann, Steve Maclin, and Willie Mack) by pinfall	10-man tag team match Since Honor No More won, they remained in Impact Wrestling.	23:17
(c) / – the champion(s) heading into the match; D / – this was a dark match; P / – the match was broadcast on the pre-show
