= No Surrender (2023) =

2023 Impact Wrestling event

- Promotional poster
- Promotion: Impact Wrestling
- Date: February 24, 2023
- City: Sunrise Manor, Nevada
- Venue: Sam's Town Live

Impact Plus Monthly Specials chronology
← Previous; Throwback Throwdown III	Next → Sacrifice

No Surrender chronology
← Previous; 2022	Next → 2024

The 2023 No Surrender was a professional wrestling event produced by Impact Wrestling. It took place on February 24, 2023, at Sam's Town Live in Sunrise Manor, Nevada, and aired on Impact Plus and YouTube. It was the 15th event under the No Surrender chronology. The event also featured wrestlers from partner promotion New Japan Pro-Wrestling (NJPW).

Ten matches were contested at the event, including two on the pre-show and one taped as a digital exclusive. In the main event, Josh Alexander defeated Rich Swann to retain the Impact World Championship. In other prominent matches, Mickie James defeated Masha Slamovich to retain the Impact Knockouts World Championship, Steve Maclin defeated Brian Myers, Heath, and PCO in a four-way match to become the number one contender to the Impact World Championship, and Joe Hendry defeated Moose in a Dot Combat match to retain the Impact Digital Media Championship.

== Production ==
=== Background ===
No Surrender is an annual professional wrestling event produced by Impact Wrestling. It was originally produced by Impact Wrestling (then known as Total Nonstop Action Wrestling), as a pay-per-view (PPV) event. The first one was held in July 2005, but when the PPV names were shuffled for 2006, it was moved to September. In December 2012, TNA announced that the event was canceled. The last event took place in the TNA Impact! Zone in September 2012. It was resumed as a special episode of Impact Wrestling between 2013 and 2015 and was then revived as an Impact Plus event in 2019.

On October 25, 2022, Impact Wrestling announced that No Surrender would take place on Friday, February 24, 2023, at the Sam's Town Live in Las Vegas, Nevada.

=== Storylines ===
The event featured several professional wrestling matches that involve different wrestlers from pre-existing scripted feuds and storylines. Wrestlers will portray villains, heroes, or less distinguishable characters in scripted events that build tension and culminate in a wrestling match or series of matches. Storylines are produced on Impact's weekly television program.

At Hard To Kill, Masha Slamovich defeated Deonna Purrazzo, Killer Kelly, and Taylor Wilde in a four-way match to become number one contender to the Impact Knockouts World Championship. Later in the main event, Mickie James defeated Jordynne Grace to win the title in a Title vs. Career match, the final match of her "Last Rodeo" campaign. On the subsequent episode of Impact!, Slamovich confronted James in the ring with a "death warrant" (a picture of James crossed out in Slamovich's blood), with Impact announcing that James will have her first title defense against Slamovich at No Surrender.

On the January 26 episode of Impact!, Rich Swann won the "Golden Six-Shooter" six-way elimination match, thus earning an Impact World Championship match against Josh Alexander at No Surrender.

On the February 2 episode of Impact!, a four-way match was announced for No Surrender to determine the next number one contender for the Impact World Championship. Qualifying matches would take place over the next two weeks. Brian Myers, PCO, Steve Maclin, and Heath qualified after defeating Dirty Dango, Shera, Rhino, and Eddie Edwards, respectively.

After Impact Knockouts World Tag Team Champions The Death Dollz (Jessicka, Rosemary, and Taya Valkyrie) won their match on the February 9 episode of Impact!, they would be confronted by former associate Father James Mitchell. He claimed he was there to put a "hex" upon The Death Dollz before they would be ambushed from behind by The Hex (Allysin Kay and Marti Belle). Four days later, on February 13, Impact announced that The Hex will challenge The Death Dolls (represented by Jessicka and Valkyrie) for the titles at No Surrender.

At Hard To Kill, Joe Hendry defended the Impact Digital Media Championship against Moose. Initially, Moose seemed to have won after a low blow to Hendry, but the match was restarted by new Director of Authority Santino Marella – taking the place of Impact Executive Vice President Scott D'Amore for the time – where Hendry would defeat Moose to retain the title. For the next month, Hendry would be involved in a feud with Matt Cardona over the title after some goading from Moose to Cardona. On the February 9 episode of Impact!, Hendry successfully defended the title against Cardona, after which he also avoided an attack from Moose. The following week, Moose shattered Marella's car window, mistakenly believing the vehicle was Hendry's, to send a message to the champion. Tired of his actions, Marella booked a Dot Combat match for the Digital Media Championship between Hendry and Moose at No Surrender.

On the February 16 episode of Impact!, Santino Marella booked a live edition of SiriusXM show "Busted Open Radio" for No Surrender, where Tommy Dreamer and Bully Ray would sort out their issues (Busted Open host Dave LaGreca would be presiding as mediator). The following week, the two men participated in a Beat the Clock Challenge to determine who would have the first word at the event. Dreamer defeated Jason Hotch in 1:15, while Ray defeated Bhupinder Gujjar in just 32 seconds, giving him the honor of speaking first.

== Event ==
Other on-screen personnel
Role	Name
Commentators	Tom Hannifan
Commentators	Matthew Rehwoldt
Commentators	Santino Marella (first match)
Ring announcer	David Penzer
Referees	Allison Leigh
Referees	Daniel Spencer
Referees	Frank Gastineau
Interviewer	Gia Miller

=== Pre-show ===
There were two matches on the pre-show. In the opener, Deonna Purrazzo faced Gisele Shaw (with Jai Vidal). In the closing stages, unbeknownst to the referee, Savannah Evans blindsided Purrazzo, allowing Shaw to hit a knee strike for the win.

After that, Jonathan Gresham took on Mike Bailey. In the end, as Bailey was looking for Ultima Weapon, Gresham countered it into a Schoolboy pin for the victory.

=== Preliminary matches ===
The pay-per-view started with Frankie Kazarian taking on Kon (with Deaner, Angels, and Callihan). In the closing stages, as Angels was distracting the referee, Callihan carried a steel chair to hit Kazarian, but unintentionally hit Kon, allowing Kazarian to perform a Slingshot Cutter for the victory.

The next bout featured The Death Dollz (Jessicka and Taya Valkyrie) (with Rosemary) defending the Impact Knockouts World Tag Team Championship against The Hex. The match ended when The Hex were looking for Hex Marks The Spot, but Jessicka countered it into the Sick Driver to retain the titles.

Next, Joe Hendry defended the Impact Digital Media Championship in a Dot Combat match against Moose. Moose performed an O'Connor Roll with the tights, but Hendry kicked out. Hendry performed the same manoeuver, also with the tights for the 1-2-3 pin.

Next, David LaGreca hosted a live edition of Busted Open Radio with Tommy Dreamer and Bully Ray. Ray wanted to make "amends" but Dreamer did not initially accept. Dreamer began to accept, but Ray threw coffee into him and hit him with a glass flask.

The fourth match featured Heath, PCO, Brian Myers, and Steve Maclin in a four-way match to determine the #1 contender to the Impact World Championship. In the end, Heath delivered the Wake Up Call to Myers, as Eddie Edwards came down and hit PCO with a shovel. Maclin then hit the KIA on Heath for the pinfall victory.

Next, Time Machine took on Bullet Club. Shelley and Sabin delivered Skull and Bones to Austin. Austin then rolled Sabin over to pick up the victory.

The penultimate match saw Mickie James defended the Impact Knockouts World Championship against Masha Slamovich. As Slamovich was looking for the Codebreaker, James rolled her over to retain her title.

=== Main event ===
In the main event, Josh Alexander defended the Impact World Championship against Rich Swann. Alexander locked into the ankle lock, but Swann escaped. Alexander the hit the C4 Spike, but Swann went under the ropes. Swann started getting momentum, hitting the Phoenix Splash, but Alexander kicked out. As Swann was looking for a second Phoenix Splash, Alexander countered it into another ankle lock, but Swann refused to tap out. Swann hit the Handspring Cutter for a two count. Alexander countered another Handspring Cutter into a Tombstone Piledriver, which gave way to another C4 Spike for the victory.

== Results ==
No.	Results	Stipulations	Times
1^{D}	The Design (Deaner and Angels) (with Callihan and Kon) defeated Decay (Black Taurus and Crazzy Steve) by pinfall (Note: The match was taped for an Impact Digital Exclusive that aired on February 28.)	Tag team match	5:49
2^{P}	Gisele Shaw (with Jai Vidal) defeated Deonna Purrazzo by pinfall	Singles match	9:07
3^{P}	Jonathan Gresham defeated Mike Bailey by pinfall	Singles match	11:01
4	Frankie Kazarian defeated Kon (with Deaner, Angels, and Callihan) by pinfall	Singles match	9:24
5	The Death Dollz (Jessicka and Taya Valkyrie) (with Rosemary) (c) defeated The Hex (Allysin Kay and Marti Belle) by pinfall	Tag team match for the Impact Knockouts World Tag Team Championship	8:57
6	Joe Hendry (c) defeated Moose by pinfall	Dot Combat match for the Impact Digital Media Championship	12:14
7	Steve Maclin defeated Brian Myers, Heath, and PCO by pinfall	Four-way match to determine the #1 contender to the Impact World Championship	9:18
8	Bullet Club (Ace Austin, Chris Bey, and Kenta) defeated Time Machine (Alex Shelley, Chris Sabin, and Kushida) by pinfall	Six-man tag team match	19:04
9	Mickie James (c) defeated Masha Slamovich by pinfall	Singles match for the Impact Knockouts World Championship	12:29
10	Josh Alexander (c) defeated Rich Swann by pinfall	Singles match for the Impact World Championship	25:13
(c) / – the champion(s) heading into the match; D / – this was a dark match; P / – the match was broadcast on the pre-show
