= Throwback Throwdown III =

2022 Impact Wrestling event

- Promotional poster
- Promotion: Impact Wrestling
- Date: November 25, 2022 (aired December 2, 2022)
- City: Winston-Salem, North Carolina
- Venue: Benton Convention Center
- Tagline: IPWF Presents: Rival Survival

Impact Plus Monthly Specials chronology
← Previous; Over Drive	Next → No Surrender

Throwback Throwdown chronology
← Previous; II	Next → IV

Throwback Throwdown III was a professional wrestling event produced by Impact Wrestling. It was taped at Benton Convention Center in Winston-Salem, North Carolina on November 25, 2022 as part of WrestleCade, and aired on December 2, 2022 on Impact Plus and YouTube. It was the third event under the Throwback Throwdown chronology. The event also featured wrestlers from independent promotions.

== Production ==
=== Background ===
The first Throwback Throwdown was a special episode of Impact that aired on November 26, 2019, and saw wrestlers portraying 1980s characters and gimmicks in the fictional Impact Provincial Wrestling Federation (IPWF). On November 2, 2022, Impact announced that Throwback Throwdown III would take place on November 25 at Benton Convention Center in Winston-Salem, North Carolina as a part of WrestleCade, with the event set to air on December 2 as an Impact Plus Monthly Special.

=== Storylines ===
The event featured several professional wrestling matches, and wrestlers portrayed heroes, villains, or less distinguishable characters. Due to the nature of the event, the storylines for Throwback Throwdown III were self-contained and independent from the rest of Impact's programming. Its story is based around the IPWF event "Rival Survival".

== Event ==
Other on-screen personnel
Role	Name
Commentators	Giuseppe Scovelli Jr. (Josh Mathews)
Commentators	Pat Gorski (Matthew Rehwoldt)
Interviewers	Dexter Petticoat (Crazzy Steve)
Interviewers	Otto Ottoman (Tom Hannifan)

=== Pre-show ===
There were two matches contested on the pre-show, with one broadcast for Before the Impact. In the main event, "The Mysterious" Mr E. took on Lazer. In the end, E spat a substance into Lazer's eyes and delivered a double axe handle for the win.

Backstage, Scovelli Jr. told his father that he was going to sell the IPWF. Scovelli Jr. said that he had already sold his shares, which lead to a main event between Team IPWF and Team GLUW (Great Lakes Unionized Wrestling).

=== Preliminary matches ===
The main card opened with Rapid Delivery Pete facing Monty Moonlight. In the end, Pete rolled up Moonlight for the win.

The next bout saw Bill Ding facing Jack Hammer in a Clock Out match. The only way to win was to retrieve a puncher in one corner and punch a timecard in the opposite. Ding won after collecting the puncher and punching the timecard.

The third match saw Georgia Cobb face Wanda the WereWoman (with The $304,000 Man). Cobb won after clotheslining The $304,000 Man as he was on the ropes, and delivering an elbow drop to the Werewoman.

Next, Ladybird Johnston hosted the Tunnel of Love with Tori Nailbiter. Sebastian Baker told Nailbiter to come and join his Hit Factory group, but she refused. Nailbiter said that she had already found a manager.

The next match saw Brian "Bone" Crunchin and mystery partner "The Dynamic" Shane Douglas take on The Sunday Morning Express (Editor-in-Chief and The Paper Boy). The match came to a close when Douglas hit a belly-to-belly suplex on Paper Boy for the win.

Next, Monsieur Baguette faced "Ornery" Otis Oates. Unbeknownst to the referee, Baguette pulled out an actual baguette from under the ring and hit Oates with to pick up the victory.

Next, Tommy Dreamer went one-on-one with Pelvis Wesley (with Colonel Corn), with the stipulation being that if Dreamer won, he could face Colonel Corn, but if Dreamer lost, he had had to leave IPWF. As Corn was distracting the referee, Wesley hit a neckbreaker, but Dreamer kicked out. Dreamer then hit a DDT on Wesley for the win.

In the next match, as stipulated, Dreamer faced Colonel Corn (with Pelvis Wesley). As Wesley was distracting the referee, Corn hit Dreamer with an object and won.

The tenth match featured The Auto-Bodies (Smoky Muffler and Rusty Transmission) teaming up against Volcanic Activity (Lucy Luau and Tina Tiki). The Auto-Bodies won after Transmission hit Luau with a wrench.

Next, Johnny Swinger, "Fleet" Feat" Keaton Fox and "Bully" Biff Knuckles faced each other to crown the inaugural IPWF Exciting Division Champion. Swinger won after executing the figure-four leglock on Knuckles and then rolling up Fox.

In the thirteenth match, Tori Nailbiter (with surprise manager Ricky Morton) took on Rusty Iron (with Sebastian Baker). Nailbiter won after blocking the use of a nail from Iron and hitting a diving crossbody.

The penultimate match featured DJ 2 Large and "Nature Boy" Buck Humphrey (with Sonny Sanders and Baby Doll). In the closing stages, Baby Doll pulled the referee out of the ring, but Humphrey inadvertently hit Sanders and 2Large hit a discus lariat for the victory. After the match, Baby Doll left with 2Large.

=== Main event ===
The main event saw Team IPWF (Conor McCoy, Tim Burr, Frank the Butcher, Giuseppe Scovelli Jr. and Giuseppe Scovelli Sr.) taking on Team GLUW ("The Devil Demon" Devon Damon, Neptune, Lord Humongous and Manfred The Mad Mammal) (with Walter Chestnut) in a 5-on-4 Rival Survival handicap elimination match to determine who controls the Impact Provincial Wrestling Federation. Everyone started fighting. Lord Humongous eliminated Frank the Butcher after a big boot. Manfred then distracted the referee, allowing Team GLUW to attack. Burr then rolled up Neptune to eliminate him. Damon then hurriedly entered the ring, allowing McCoy to deliver a jawbreaker and Bure to hit a double axe handle to eliminate Damon. Burr then collected his actual ax and hit Manfred, causing a disqualification and thus, eliminating Burr. It remained only McCoy, Manfred, Lord Humongous and Scovelli Jr. McCoy delivered a missile dropkick from the top rope to Manfred and Lord Humongous. Scovelli Sr. replaces his son to him tweaking his ankle. McCoy and Scovelli Sr., and Manfred and Lord Humongous started brawling, which led to the referee being knocked down. McCoy and Scovelli Sr. hit stereo stunners on both Manfred and Lord Humongous, but the referee was still knocked down, so Scovelli Jr. came back into the ring as a new referee and counted the 1-2-3 pin, so therefore, McCoy the Scovellis we're the sole survivors and Team IPWF retained control of the Impact Provincial Wrestling Federation. After the match, Scovelli Sr. delivered a Michinoku Driver to Chestnut as the show went off the air.

== Results ==
No.	Results	Stipulations	Times
1^{D}	Ladybird Johnston (Jessicka) defeated Miss Bea Haven (Alisha Edwards) by pinfall (Note: The match was taped for Before the Impact that aired on December 1.)	Singles match	8:27
2^{P}	"The Mysterious" Mr. E (Shogun) defeated Lazer by pinfall	Singles match	4:29
3	Rapid Delivery Pete (Rich Swann) defeated Monty Moonlight (Zicky Dice) by pinfall	Singles match	5:06
4	Bill Ding (Trey Miguel) defeated Jack Hammer (Andrew Everett)	Clock Out match	8:03
5	"Rough Rider" Georgia Cobb (Jordynne Grace) defeated Wanda the Werewoman (Savannah Evans) (with The $304,000 Man (R.D. Evans)) by pinfall	Singles match	6:50
6	Brian "Bone" Crunchin (Brian Myers) and "The Dynamic" Shane Douglas defeated The Sunday Morning Express (Editor-in-Chief (Chris Sabin) and The Paper Boy (Jack Price)) by pinfall	Tag team match	5:55
7	Monsieur Baguette (Mike Bailey) defeated "Ornery" Otis Oates (Deaner) by pinfall	Singles match	6:49
8	Tommy Dreamer defeated Pelvis Wesley (Heath) (with Colonel Corn (John E. Bravo)) by pinfall	Singles match Since Tommy Dreamer won, he got 5 minutes alone with Colonel Corn. Had Tommy Dreamer lost, he would have had to leave IPWF.	7:51
9	Colonel Corn (John E. Bravo) (with Pelvis Wesley (Heath)) defeated Tommy Dreamer by pinfall	Singles match	2:48
10	The Auto-Bodies (Smoky Muffler (Mickie James) and Busty Transmission (ODB)) defeated Volcanic Activity (Lucy Luau (Gisele Shaw) and Tina Tiki (Tasha Steelz)) by pinfall	Tag team match	7:58
11	Johnny Swinger defeated "Fleet Feat" Keaton Fox (Jason Hotch) and "Bully" Biff Knuckles (John Skyler) by pinfall	Three-way match for the inaugural IPWF Exciting Division Championship	5:33
12	Tori Nailbiter (Rosemary) (with Ricky Morton) defeated Rusty Iron (Gia Miller) (with Sebastian Baker (Jimmy Jacobs)) by pinfall	Singles match	6:11
13	DJ 2 Large (Moose) defeated "Nature Boy" Buck Humphrey (Kaleb with a K) (with Sonny Sanders (Sami Callihan) and Baby Doll) by pinfall	Singles match	9:29
14	Team Impact Provincial Wrestling Federation ("Cowboy" Colt McCoy (Eddie Edwards), Tim Burr (Josh Alexander), Frank the Butcher (Rhino), Giuseppe Scovelli Jr. (Josh Mathews), and Giuseppe Scovelli Sr. (Scott D'Amore)) defeated Team Great Lakes Unionized Wrestling (Devon Damon (Crowbar), Neptune (Shera), Lord Humongous (Big Kon), and Manfred The Mad Mammal (Beer City Bruiser)) (with Walter Chestnut (David Penzer))	5-on-4 Handicap elimination tag team match The winner took control of IPWF.	15:25
D / – this was a dark match; P / – the match was broadcast on the pre-show

=== Rival Survival Elimination match ===
Eliminated	Wrestler	Eliminated by	Method	Team
1	Frank The Butcher	Lord Humongous	Pinfall	Team IPWF
2	Neptune	Tim Burr	Pinfall	Team GLUW
3	Devon Damon	Tim Burr	Pinfall	Team GLUW
4	Tim Burr	N/A	Disqualification	Team IPWF
5	Lord Humongous	Colt McCoy and Giuseppe Scovelli Sr.	Pinfall	Team GLUW
6	Manfred The Mad Mammal	Colt McCoy and Giuseppe Scovelli Sr.	Pinfall	Team GLUW
Winners	Colt McCoy, Giuseppe Scovelli Jr., Giuseppe Scovelli Sr.			Team IPWF
