= Throwback Throwdown IV =

2023 Impact Wrestling event

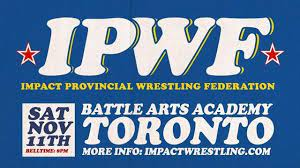
- Promotional poster
- Promotion: Impact Wrestling
- Date: November 11, 2023 (aired November 30, 2023)
- City: Mississauga, Ontario, Canada
- Venue: Don Kolov Arena

Throwback Throwdown chronology
| ← Previous; III | Next → — |

Throwback Throwdown IV was a professional wrestling event produced by Impact Wrestling. It took place at Don Kolov Arena in Mississauga, Ontario, Canada on November 11, 2023, and will be aired on tape delay on November 30, 2023. It was the fourth event under the Throwback Throwdown chronology.

== Production ==
=== Background ===
The first Throwback Throwdown was a special episode of Impact that aired on November 26, 2019, and saw wrestlers portraying 1980's characters and gimmicks in the fictional Impact Provincial Wrestling Federation (IPWF). On September 26, 2023, Impact announced that Throwback Throwdown IV would take place on November 11 at Don Kolov Arena in Mississauga, Ontario, Canada as a television special.

=== Storylines ===
The event will be featured several professional wrestling matches, and wrestlers portrayed heroes, villains, or less distinguishable characters. Due to the nature of the event, the storylines for Throwback Throwdown IV were self-contained and independent from the rest of Impact's programming.

== Event ==
Other on-screen personnel
| Role | Name |
|---|---|
| Commentators | Giuseppe Scovelli Jr. (Josh Mathews) |
| Commentators | Ignatius Quigley (Alex Shelley) |
| Interviewer | George "The Iceman" |

=== Preliminary matches ===
In the opening contest, Rapid Delivery Pete faced Kamikazi. In the closing stages, Kamikazi delivered two jawbreakers to Pete for a two-count. Kamikazi then locked in a sleeper hold on Pete, but Pete escaped with a back suplex. Pete then delivered a flying crossbody, a jumping kick and a standing splash to Kamikazi and pinned him to win the match.

Next, Frank the Butcher (accompanied by Giuseppe Scovelli Sr.) faced Neptune (accompanied by Walter Chestnut) with this stipulation being that if Shera lost, he and Chestnut had to become IPWF janitors. In the closing stages, Neptune delivered an overhead punch to Frank the Butcher for a two-count. As Neptune wanted to attempt a diving axe-handle, Frank impeded it with a big boot and proceeded to hit a shoulder tackle and a lariat and pinned Neptune to win the match.

In the next match, The Sunday Morning Express (Paper Boy and Editor-in-Chief) took on The Hard Workers (Harry Hall and Otis Oates). In the closing stages, Hall delivered a shoulder tackle to the Paper Boy and started dancing. Hall then delivered stereo clotheslines to Paper Boy and Editor-in-Chief. As Editor-in-chief sent Hall into the ropes, Paper Boy hit Hall with a newspaper (unbeknownst to the referee), allowing Editor-in-Chief to use a schoolboy pin on Hall to secure the victory for his team.

Next, Colt McCoy and Georgia Cobb took on Rusty Iron and Rip Rayzor. In the closing stages, Cobb delivered a big boot, a powerslam and an elbow drop to Rusty Iron for a two-count. McCoy and Cobb then delivered stereo atomico drops to Rusty Iron and Rayzor. Unbeknownst to the referee, Rayzor hit a low blow on McCoy and used a schoolboy pin on him for a two-count. Cobb delivered the Vader Bomb to Rusty Iron for a near fall. McCoy delivered a neckbreaker to Rayzor, allowing Cobb to deliver an airplane spin/rolling senton combination to Rusty Iron and pinned her to win the match for her team.

In the penultimate match, DJ 2 Large defended the IPWF Television Championship against The Masked Brother (accompanied by The $369,000 Man). In the opening stages, The Masked Brother delivered a running knee and an elbow drop to DJ 2 Large, but The Masked Brother used the ropes for leverage, forcing the referee to stop the count. The Masked Brother then shoved the referee, allowing DJ 2 Large to use a schoolboy pin on The Masked Brother for a two-count. As The Masked Brother attempted a running knee to DJ 2 Large, DJ 2 Large moved out of the way and The Masked Brother inadvertently hit the referee. DJ 2 Large then delivered a discus lariat, but the referee was still knocked out. Another referee then came out to count the pinfall, but it was only a two-count. DJ 2 Large then hit The Masked Brother with a reverse atomic drop. Two henchmen then came down into the ring to attack DJ 2 Large, but DJ 2 Large then threw them out of the ring. As the referee was still distracted by the henchmen, The Masked Brother hit DJ 2 Large with a foreign object and then pinned DJ 2 Large to win the title.

=== Main event ===
In the main event, Tim Burr faced Boris Alexiev (accompanied by Colonel Corn). In the closing stages, Boris locked in a side headlock, but Burr reversed it into a hammerlock submission. Boris then delivered multiple chops. As Boris attempted the Iron Claw, Burr moved out of the way and rolled Boris up for a two-count. Boris then delivered a suplex to Burr for a two-count. Burr then hit a Stinger Splash and a top-rope bulldog to Boris for a nearfall. As Burr lifted Boris onto his shoulders, Boris escaped and locked in a crossface submission, but Burr reached the bottom ropes. As Boris attempted another Iron Claw, Burr stopped him and threw the claw away. Burr then hit a diving axe-handle to Boris and pinned him to win. After the match, the locker room came out to celebrate with Burr as the event went off the air.

== Results ==
| No. | Results | Stipulations | Times |
|---|---|---|---|
| 1^{D} | Brian Bone Crunchin' (Brian Myers) defeated Dick Waters (Sheldon Jean) by pinfall (Note: The match was taped for an Impact Digital Exclusive that aired on November 30.) | Singles match | 6:17 |
| 2^{D} | Red Letter (Jody Threat) defeated Ladybird Johnston (Jessicka) by pinfall | Singles match | 5:56 |
| 3^{D} | Quincy Cosmos (Rohit Raju) defeated Bill Ding (Trey Miguel) and Pete Fox (Jason Hotch) by pinfall | Triangle match to determine the #1 contender to the IPWF Exciting Division Championship | 7:49 |
| 4 | Rapid Delivery Pete (Rich Swann) defeated Kamikazi (Mike Bailey) by pinfall | Singles match | 7:11 |
| 5 | Frank the Butcher (Rhino) (with Giuseppe Scovelli Sr. (Scott D'Amore)) defeated Neptune (Mahabali Shera) (with Walter Chesnut (David Penzer)) by pinfall | Singles match Since Neptune lost, he and Chesnut were forced to become the new IPWF janitors. | 3:39 |
| 6 | The Sunday Morning Service (Editor-in-Chief (Chris Sabin) and The Paper Boy (Jack Price)) defeated The Hard Workers (Harry Hall (Jake Something) and Otis Oates (Deaner)) by pinfall | Tag team match | 6:13 |
| 7 | Georgia Cobb (Jordynne Grace) and "Cowboy" Colt McCoy (Eddie Edwards) defeated Rusty Iron (Gia Miller) and Rip Rayzor (Ace Austin) by pinfall | Mixed tag team match | 6:57 |
| 8 | The Masked Brother (Frankie Kazarian) (with the $369,000 Man (R. D. Evans)) defeated DJ 2 Large (Moose) (c) by pinfall | Singles match for the IPWF International Commonwealth Television Championship | 5:57 |
| 9 | Tim Burr (Josh Alexander) defeated Boris Alexiev (Santino Marella) (with The Comrade (Alpha Bravo)) by pinfall | Fall Maul Tournament Finals | 6:31 |
(c) / – the champion(s) heading into the match; D / – this was a dark match
