= Final Resolution (2023) =

2023 Impact Wrestling pay-per-view event

- Promotional poster
- Promotion: Impact Wrestling
- Date: December 9, 2023
- City: Mississauga, Ontario, Canada
- Venue: Don Kolov Arena

Impact Plus Monthly Specials chronology
← Previous; Turning Point	Next → No Surrender

Final Resolution chronology
← Previous; 2020	Next → 2024

The 2023 Final Resolution was the professional wrestling event produced by Impact Wrestling. It took place on December 9, 2023, at the Don Kolov Arena in Mississauga, Ontario, Canada and aired on Impact Plus. It was the 12th event under the Final Resolution chronology, the first to be held since the 2020 event.

Twelve matches were contested at the event, including three on the pre-show. In the main event, Josh Alexander and Zack Sabre Jr. defeated The Motor City Machine Guns (Alex Shelley and Chris Sabin). In other prominent matches, Moose defeated Rhino in a Street Fight, Mike Bailey and Trent Seven defeated The Rascalz (Zachary Wentz and Trey Miguel) and in the opening contest, ABC (Ace Austin and Chris Bey) defeated Brian Myers and Eddie Edwards to retain the Impact World Tag Team Championship.

Final Resolution was the final live show under the Impact Wrestling banner, as the company would rebrand under the revived Total Nonstop Action Wrestling (TNA) name beginning in January 2024. It also featured the debut of Trent Seven, who signed with the company that night after being offered a contract by president Scott D'Amore.

== Production ==
=== Storylines ===
The event featured professional wrestling matches that involve different wrestlers from pre-existing scripted feuds and storylines. Wrestlers portrayed villains, heroes, or less distinguishable characters in scripted events that build tension and culminate in a wrestling match or series of matches.

== Event ==
Other on-screen personnel
Role:	Name:
Commentators	Tom Hannifan
Commentators	Matthew Rehwoldt
Ring announcer	David Penzer
Referees	Daniel Spencer
Referees	Allison Leigh
Referees	Frank Gastineau
Interviewer	Gia Miller

=== Pre-show ===
There were three matches contested on the pre-show. In the opener, PCO faced Jessie V. In the closing stages, PCO delivered a top-rope somersault senton to Jessie V on the apron. Jessie V then delivered an enzeguiri and a frog splash to PCO for a two-count. PCO then delivered a reverse DDT and landed the PCO-Sault and pinned Jessie V to win the match.

Next, Jack Price faced Aiden Prince. In the closing stages, Prince landed a brainbuster and a flatliner DDT to Price for a nearfall. Price then delivered a dropkick and a Burning Hammer to Prince for a nearfall. Price then delivered a leg lariat and the Pressure Check to Prince for the win.

In the pre-show main event, Frankie Kazarian faced Sheldon Jean. In the closing stages, as Kazarian attempted a springboard legdrop, Jean pushed him to the outside. Kazarian then delivered multiple elbows and a springboard leg drop to Jean for a two-count. Jean attempted a leg lariat, but Kazarian dodged and locked in the Crossface chickenwing, forcing Jean to tap out.

=== Preliminary matches ===
In the opening contest, ABC (Ace Austin and Chris Bey) defended the Impact World Tag Team Championship against Brian Myers and Eddie Edwards (accompanied by Alisha Edwards). In the opening stages, Austin landed an uppercut to Edwards for a two-count. Myers then landed a gourdbuster and a uranage to Bey for a two-count. Austin then delivered a springboard tornado kick to Edwards for a two-count. As Austin and Bey attempted the 1-2-Sweet, Edwards ducked and delivered a Blue Thunder Bomb to Austin for a two-count. Myers and Edwards then delivered a backpack stunner/elbow drop combination to Bey for a nearfall. As Myers and Edwards attempted a double suplex, Bey pulled Austin out and Austin delivered a stomp to Myers for a two-count. Bey and Austin then delivered the Art of Finesse/The Fold combination (1-2-Sweet) on Myers and pinned him to retain the title. After the match, The Rascalz (Trey Miguel and Zachary Wentz) attacked Austin and Bey.

Next, Jody Threat faced Alisha Edwards. In the opening stages, Jody delivered an exploder suplex to Alisha, but as Brian Myers and Eddie Edwards attempted to hit Jody, the referee ejected them from ringside. Alisha then delivered a basement crossbody to Jody for a two-count. Jody then delivered multiple clotheslines and a Michinoku Driver for a two-count. Jody then landed a diving crossbody and an F-5 on Alisha to win the match.

Next, Tommy Dreamer defended the Impact Digital Media Championship against Deaner. In the closing stages, Dreamer delivered a Bionic Elbow and a cutter to Deaner for a two-count. As Deaner attempted to hit Dreamer with the Digital Media belt, the referee prevented him from using it, allowing Dreamer to use a schoolboy pin on Deaner for a two-count. Deaner then delivered a lariat to Dreamer and placed the title belt on the turnbuckle. Dreamer then pushed Deaner into the belt and landed the Dreamer DDT on Deaner and pinned him to retain the title.

Next, The Rascalz (Trey Miguel and Zachary Wentz) faced Mike Bailey and the debuting Trent Seven. In the opening stages, The Rascalz delivered a Codebreaker/Neckbreaker/Standing Shooting Star Press to Seven for a two-count. Bailey then delivered a standing shooting star press to Miguel for a two-count. Seven then delivered a corner powerbomb to Wentz. As Seven attempted the Burning Hammer, Wentz blocked it and delivered a German suplex and a double stomp for a two-count. ABC (Ace Austin and Chris Bey) then came down to the ring and distracted Miguel, allowing Bailey to deliver a diving splash to Miguel. Seven and Bailey then delivered a Burning Hammer/Ultima Weapon combination on Wentz and pinned him to win the match. After the match, Impact president Scott D'Amore offered Seven a TNA contract, which he signed.

In the next match, Jake Something faced Jason Hotch. In the closing stages, Hotch delivered a superkick to Something for a two-count. Something then delivered a bodyslam and a spinebuster to Hotch for a two-count. Something then delivered a lariat, a powerbomb and The Void to Hotch and pinned him to win the match.

Next, Rhino faced Moose in a Street Fight. Originally the match was a one-on-one match, but Moose delivered a low blow to Rhino, allowing Rhino to win by disqualification. Rhino then suggested that the match be restarted under Street Fight rules. In the opening stages, Rhino delivered a suplex on the ramp and a powerbomb through a table to Moose for a two-count. As Moose attempted a Spear, Rhino dodged and sent Moose through a ladder wedged in between the turnbuckles. Rhino then inadvertently pushed Moose into the referee and landed the Gore on Moose, but the referee was still knocked down. Another referee came down to the ring to count the pin, but it was only a two-count. As Rhino attempted another Gore to Moose, Moose moved out of the way and Rhino landed through a table. Moose then delivered a Spear to Rhino and pinned him to win the match.

In the penultimate match, Trinity and Jordynne Grace faced Deonna Purrazzo and Gisele Shaw. In the closing stages, Grace delivered stalling suplex and a spinning powerslam to Shaw for a two-count. Trinity then delivered a running bulldog to Shaw, but Purrazzo broke up the pin attempt. As Trinity attempted a full nelson bomb, Shaw escaped and delivered a double foot stomp to Trinity for a two-count. As Purrazzo attempted the Queen's Gambit to Grace, Grace escaped and delivered a pumphandle suplex. Grace then delivered a spinning back elbow and Trinity delivered the full nelson bomb on Purrazzo and pinned her to win the match. After the match, Shaw and Purrazzo shoved each other and Purrazzo extended her hand. Shaw shook Purrazzo's hand, but pulled her back and delivered Shock and Awe.

=== Main event ===
In the main event, Zack Sabre Jr. and Josh Alexander teamed up to face The Motor City Machine Guns (Chris Sabin and Alex Shelley). In the opening stages, Sabre Jr. escaped a headscissors takedown from Shelley, but got locked into a hammerlock seatbelt. Sabre Jr. then delivered a Pele Kick to Shelley and Alexander kicked the back of Shelley's leg. Shelley the delivered a straightjacket/backstabber on Sabre Jr.. Shelley and Sabin then delivered a running bulldog to Sabre Jr. for a two-count. Alexander then delivered a German Suplex to Shelley, but as he attempted the C4 Spike, Shelley escaped and pushed him into the turnbuckle. Sabin then delivered a discus elbow and a tornado DDT to Sabre Jr. for a two-count. As Shelley attempted ShellShock to Alexander, Sabre Jr. stopped him and landed a European uppercut. As Sabin lifted Sabre Jr. up for Cradle Shock, Sabre Jr. escaped and locked in a double arm-stretch. As Shelley attempted to save Sabin, Alexander stopped him and locked in an ankle lock. Sabre Jr. then delivered a European clutch on Shelley, but Sabin delivered the Clothesline from Michigan on Sabre Jr. to prevent the three-count. As Sabin and Shelley attempted a double-team Sliced Bread, Sabre Jr. impeded it with an armbar on Shelley, allowing Alexander to hit the C4 Spike on Sabin and pin him to win the match for his team.

== Results ==
No.	Results	Stipulations	Times
1^{P}	PCO defeated Jessie V by pinfall	Singles match	5:25
2^{P}	Jack Price defeated Aiden Prince by pinfall	Singles match	6:07
3^{P}	Frankie Kazarian defeated Sheldon Jean by submission	Singles match	6:24
4	ABC (Chris Bey and Ace Austin) (c) defeated Brian Myers and Eddie Edwards (with Alisha Edwards) by pinfall	Tag team match for the Impact World Tag Team Championship	11:36
5	Jody Threat defeated Alisha Edwards (with Eddie Edwards and Brian Myers) by pinfall	Singles match	7:44
6	Tommy Dreamer (c) defeated Deaner by pinfall	Singles match for the Impact Digital Media Championship	11:38
7	Speedball Mountain (Trent Seven and Mike Bailey) defeated The Rascalz (Zachary Wentz and Trey Miguel) by pinfall	Tag team match	15:13
8	Jake Something defeated Jason Hotch by pinfall	Singles match	6:51
9	Rhino defeated Moose by disqualification	Singles match	1:57
10	Moose defeated Rhino by pinfall	Street Fight	9:22
11	Trinity and Jordynne Grace defeated Deonna Purrazzo and Gisele Shaw by pinfall	Tag team match	11:01
12	Zack Sabre Jr. and Josh Alexander defeated The Motor City Machine Guns (Chris Sabin and Alex Shelley) by pinfall	Tag team match	28:08
(c) / – the champion(s) heading into the match; P / – the match was broadcast on the pre-show
