= Impact Wrestling Over Drive =

2022 Impact Wrestling event

Over Drive
- Promotional poster featuring Josh Alexander and Frankie Kazarian
- Promotion: Impact Wrestling
- Date: November 18, 2022
- City: Louisville, Kentucky
- Venue: Old Forester's Paristown Hall

Impact Plus Monthly Specials chronology
← Previous; Victory Road	Next → Throwback Throwdown III

Over Drive was a professional wrestling event produced by Impact Wrestling. It took place on November 18, 2022, at Old Forester's Paristown Hall in Louisville, Kentucky, and aired on Impact Plus and YouTube. The event also featured wrestlers from partner promotions Lucha Libre AAA Worldwide (AAA) and New Japan Pro-Wrestling (NJPW).

Ten matches were contested at the event, including two on the Countdown to Over Drive pre-show and one taped as a digital exclusive. In the main event, Josh Alexander defeated Frankie Kazarian to retain the Impact World Championship. In other prominent matches, Jordynne Grace defeated Masha Slamovich in a Last Knockout Standing match to retain the Impact Knockouts World Championship, Trey Miguel defeated Black Taurus to win the vacant Impact X Division Championship, Mickie James defeated Taylor Wilde in a Career Threatening match, and Bully Ray defeated Moose in a Tables match in the opening bout.

The event received positive reviews from critics, with much praise being directed to the X Division Championship Tournament final, the Last Knockout Standing bout, and the Impact World Title main event.

== Production ==
=== Background ===
On July 18, 2022, Impact Wrestling announced that Over Drive would take place on November 18, 2022, at Old Forester's Paristown Hall in Louisville, Kentucky.

=== Storylines ===
The event featured several professional wrestling matches that involved different wrestlers from pre-existing scripted feuds and storylines. Wrestlers portrayed villains, heroes, or less distinguishable characters in scripted events that build tension and culminate in a wrestling match or series of matches. Storylines were produced on Impact's weekly television program.

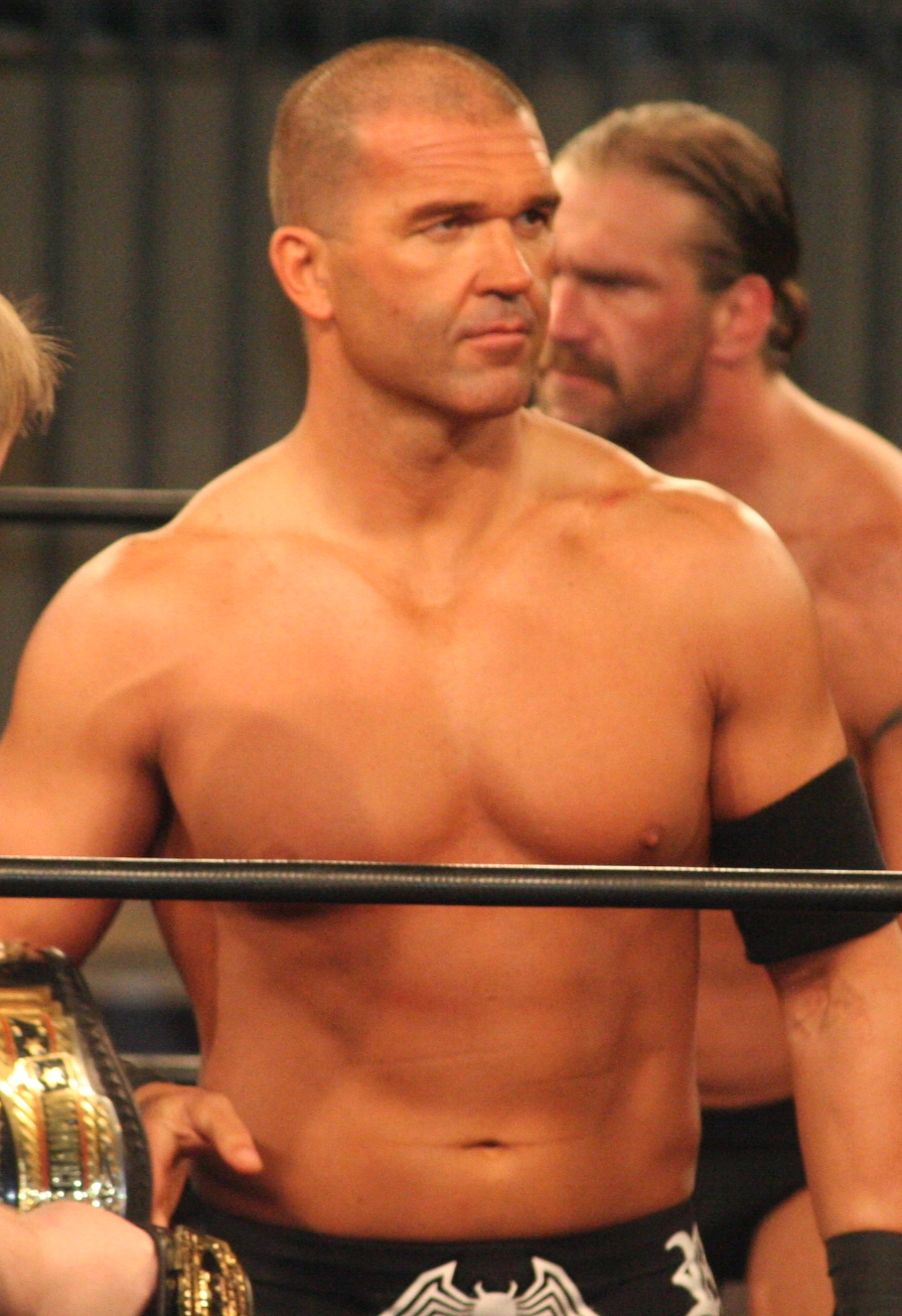
Frankie Kazarian invoked Option C by vacating the X Division Championship for an Impact World Championship match at Over Drive.

On the October 13 episode of Impact!, after Josh Alexander successfully defended the Impact World Championship against Bobby Fish, X Division Champion Frankie Kazarian invoked Option C, vacating the X Division Championship the following week for a world title match at Over Drive.

As a result of Frankie Kazarian invoking Option C, an eight-man tournament was organized to crown a new X Division Champion, with the finals set to take place at Over Drive. Black Taurus, Trey Miguel, PJ Black, and Mike Bailey advanced to the semifinals by defeating Laredo Kid, Alan Angels, Yuya Uemura, and Kenny King, respectively. Miguel advanced to the final by defeating Bailey via disqualification after King threw the former into the ring steps, and Taurus advanced to the final by defeating Black.

On the October 20 episode of Impact!, Heath and Rhino won the Impact World Tag Team Championship by defeating The Kingdom (Matt Taven and Mike Bennett). The following week, The Motor City Machine Guns (Alex Shelley and Chris Sabin), who lost to The Kingdom at Bound for Glory, looked to gain another title match from the new champions. However, The Major Players (Brian Myers and Matt Cardona) also wanted a shot, so Shelley and Cardona faced off in singles competition later that night. There, Cardona picked up the win after Myers hit Shelley with the Impact Digital Media Championship belt. This win earned The Major Players a tag team title match against Heath and Rhino at Over Drive.

At Bound for Glory, The Death Dollz (Jessicka and Taya Valkyrie) (accompanied by Rosemary) defeated the Knockouts World Tag Team Champions VXT (Chelsea Green and Deonna Purrazzo) to win the titles. On the November 3 episode of Impact!, Jessicka answered an open challenge to face Savannah Evans, which was offered by Evan's ally Tasha Steelz, but was unsuccessful. Following Jessicka's loss, it was confirmed that Evans and Steelz would challenge The Death Dollz for their title.

At Bound for Glory, Bully Ray returned to Impact in the Call Your Shot Gauntlet, last eliminating Steve Maclin to win a championship match of his choosing at any time. Later in the night, after Josh Alexander retained the Impact World Championship against Eddie Edwards, Honor No More attacked Alexander from behind, appearing to let Ray invoke his title match right then and there. However, Ray instead helped Alexander fend off Honor No More to close out the show. On the subsequent episode of Impact!, Ray explained to Alexander that, due to his checkered past in Impact as someone who will do anything to get what he wants, he wants to use his opportunity the right way in order to preserve his legacy. However, many questioned Ray's true motives, including Moose, who called Ray nothing but a "scumbag". On the October 20 episode of Impact!, Ace Austin was attacked in the parking garage before a tag team match with Chris Bey against Ray and Tommy Dreamer, leading to more suspicion being put on Ray. The following week, Ray tried to explain that he was not the culprit, and arbitrarily blamed Moose for the attack. Later, Moose came out during a match between Dreamer and Bey, with Ray in Dreamer's corner. There, Moose swept Bey's legs and walked off, making it seem that Ray had committed the act instead. On November 4, Impact announced that Ray and Moose will meet one-on-one at Over Drive. On the November 10 episode of Impact!, after Ray defeated Zicky Dice, Moose would deliver a low blow to Ray before spearing him through a table. As such, their match would later turn into a tables match.

At Bound for Glory, Taylor Wilde made her return to Impact in the Call Your Shot Gauntlet, where she was eliminated 12th by Matt Cardona. On the October 20 episode of Impact!, after Wilde defeated Mia Yim, Wilde was welcomed back by Mickie James, who is in her final run before retiring (dubbed "The Last Rodeo".) Before James could challenge Wilde to a match, both were attacked by VXT (Chelsea Green and Deonna Purrazzo) and Gisele Shaw up until the Knockouts World Champion Jordynne Grace made the save. This led into a six-woman tag team match between all involved on the following episode of Impact!, which Grace, James, and Wilde were victorious. On the November 10 episode of Impact!, after James defeated Green, Impact confirmed that James would face Wilde at Over Drive.

At Bound for Glory, Jordynne Grace successfully defended the Impact Knockouts World Championship against Masha Slamovich, breaking the latter's undefeated streak. Several weeks later on the November 10 episode of Impact!, Grace defended the title against Gisele Shaw. After the match, Slamovich returned and attacked Grace on the entrance ramp with steel chairs. On November 14, Impact announced that Grace will once again defend the title against Slamovich in a Last Knockout Standing match.

== Event ==
Other on-screen personnel
Commentators	Tom Hannifan
Commentators	Matthew Rehwoldt
Ring announcer	David Penzer
Referees	Daniel Spencer
Referees	Brandon Tolle
Referees	Frank Gastineau
Referees	Allison Leigh
Interviewer	Gia Miller

=== Digital Media Exclusive Match ===
Before the event went live, Joe Hendry defeated Shera to retain the Impact Digital Media Championship, which was aired as an Impact Digital Exclusive on November 22.

=== Countdown to Over Drive ===
Two matches were contested on the Countdown to Over Drive pre-show. In the first match, Bhupinder Gujjar, Jason Hotch, Kenny King, Mike Bailey, Rich Swann and Yuya Uemura competed in an X Division six-way match. In the end, Swann delivers the "Lethal Injection" to Hotch and picks up the win.

In the second pre-show match, The Motor City Machine Guns (Alex Shelley and Chris Sabin) fought Bullet Club (Ace Austin and Chris Bey) to determine the number one contenders to the Impact World Tag Team Championship. In the end, Sabin pins Bey and wins the match for his team.

=== Preliminary matches ===
The opening match of the event was Bully Ray against Moose in a tables match. Moose delivers a low blow to Ray from behind, and hits the spear afterwards. Moose brings two tables into the ring, setting up one in the corner, but gets speared by Ray. Outside the ring, Moose attempts to suplex Ray into the timekeeper's table, but gets suplexed on the floor. Back in the ring, Ray delivers a body slam to Moose and lands a headbutt into his balls, but gets hit with a steel chair when setting up a table. Ray counters a uranage into the table, delivers a German suplex to Moose, and uses the steel chair onto his back. Moose escapes a uranage and lands a pump kick on Ray, catches him with a dropkick on the top rope, but Ray powerbombs Moose off the top rope. After exchanging strikes with each other, Moose escapes from the "Bully Bomb" and goes to the top rope, but gets caught in mid-air with a cutter. Ray charges at Moose who avoid him and goes through the table, but the referee does not give Moose the win because he did not put him through the table himself. Moose sets up another table in the corner, but gets speared by Ray through it, giving him the win.

Next, The Death Dollz (Jessicka and Taya Valkyrie) defended the Impact Knockouts World Tag Team Championship against Savannah Evans and Tasha Steelz. The Death Dollz get the early advantage after hitting Steelz with running strikes into their corner, and Jessicka delivering a sidewalk slam for a two count. Jessicka tosses Steelz into her corner and demands Evans tag in, which she does and the two trade blows with each other, before Jessicka scoop slams Evans and lands a leg drop for two. Jessicka tags Valkyrie in and deliver a double hip attack to Evans. Evans retakes control after delivering a headbutt and a kick to Valkyrie before tagging Steelz. Steelz lands a dropkick on Valkyrie for two, tags Evans in the match to continue the assault in their corner, but Valkyrie manages to clothesline Evans. Jessicka and Steelz tag in the match, with the former managing to set up the latter and Evans for a double running crossbody. Jessicka counters a cutter attempt by Steelz, and hits the "Sick Driver" for the win to retain the tag titles.

The third match involved Mickie James and Taylor Wilde in a Career Threatening match. The two lockup before trading wristlocks and arm drags with each other. After hitting each other with a hurricanrana, James sends Wilde to the outside on the floor, but gets dragged outside herself by Wilde who rams her into the ring apron. Back in the ring, Wilde goes for James's back with a snap suplex, a surfboard and a backbreaker that results in two counts. James and Wilde exchange strikes to each other, the latter getting the upper hand after some blows to the lower back, but James lands a Thesz press and a neckbreaker on Wilde. Wilde counters the "Mick-DT" and hits a running knee on James, who answers back with a flapjack on Wilde. James goes to the top rope, Wilde catches her up top before getting dumped off it, avoids James's move and hits a German suplex for two followed by a Camel clutch. James escapes to hit some kicks and the "Mick-DT" for three to win the match. After the match, Deonna Purrazzo enters the ring and confronts James, calling her a "selfish bitch" for only being in the company for herself, and being hellbent on ruining Purrazzo's career. Purrazzo declares she wants to end James's career.

The fourth match saw Heath and Rhino defending the Impact World Tag Team Championship against The Major Players (Brian Myers and Matt Cardona). Rhino and Myers start the match with the former landing some big moves on the latter. Heath tags in and gets pummeled by The Major Players, but manages to put Myers into the Tree of Woe, allowing he and Rhino to send Cardona into him. The Major Players regain control after taking Heath to the floor, and Cardona hits Heath with a clothesline. Back in the ring, The Major Players continue to apply more damage to Heath, with Cardona catapulting Heath's throat into the bottom rope, and keeping him from tagging Rhino into the match. Heath gets a brief reprieve after sending Cardona into Myers' boot in their corner, but gets cut off from getting to Rhino. After Cardona pulls Rhino off the apron to prevent him from tagging Heath, The Motor City Machine Guns arrive with chairs to sit on while watching the match. Cardona goes for the Reboot, but Heath counters it by sending him over the top rope to the floor, and tags in Rhino who delivers a belly-to-belly suplex to Myers. Myers hits a flatliner for two and delivers a double DDT alongside Cardona for another nearfall that gets broken up by Heath. The Guns prevent Cardona from using a steel chair in the match, allowing Rhino to hit the "Gore" on Myers for three and retain the tag titles.

The fifth match involved Black Taurus and Trey Miguel competing in the tournament finals for the vacant X Division Championship. The two match each other move for move, trading shoulder tackles, arm drags and headscissors before coming to a standoff. Taurus delivers a bulldog, a sling blade and a backbreaker to Miguel for two. Taurus climbs the ropes to hit a flying headbutt followed by a snap powerslam for another two count. Taurus applies a modified Texas Cloverleaf to Miguel, who manages to reach the ropes, but gets caught with a pop-up Samoan drop for two. After receiving some chops, Miguel lands a flurry of kicks to Taurus, and both men are down. Miguel continues the offense with multiple shots in the corner, and hits a running meteora for a nearfall. The two exchange forearm strikes in the middle of the ring, and knock each other out after a double headbutt. Miguel avoids a "Destination Hellhole" attempt and gets a sunset flip on Taurus for two, followed by an enzuigiri for another two count. Both men go up top, with Taurus hitting a gorilla press slam on Miguel for a nearfall. Taurus misses a running knee in the corner and goes over to the outside, with Miguel going over the top to hit a hurricanrana on the floor. Back in the ring, Miguel goes to the top rope to hit a meteora for another nearfall. Taurus gets Miguel on his shoulders and both men go to the outside, with Taurus sending Miguel back-first into the ring post. Back in the ring, Miguel blinds Taurus with spray paint, and hits the "Lightning Spiral" for three to win the vacant title.

The penultimate match saw Jordynne Grace defending the Knockouts World Championship against Masha Slamovich in a Last Knockouts Standing match. The two immediately brawl on the outside, with Grace avoiding a steel chair attack, and hitting Slamovich with a delayed vertical suplex. Slamovich prevents a piledriver attempt by back dropping Grace on the ramp, applies a stretch muffler and drives Grace into the ring post. Back in the ring, Slamovich delivers a swinging neckbreaker on Grace, who answers back with a snap suplex. Grace brings in several steel chairs into the ring, sets two up and powerbombs Slamovich through them, who barely stops the ten count. Grace sets up a chair in the corner, but Slamovich catches Grace with an air raid crash on the chair, who breaks the ten count. After some exchanged strikes, Grace hits Slamovich with a vertebreak-her on a trash can. Grace attempts to set up Slamovich for the muscle buster, but she blocks it and lands a Moscow Sunrise on Grace. Grace goes after Slamovich's leg before applying the figure-four leg lock that goes to the outside. Slamovich blocks a "Grace Driver" attempt and hits Grace with a reverse piledriver, who barely breaks the ten count. Slamovich sets up a door bridge and wraps a toilet seat around Grace's neck and drags her to it. Grace gets Slamovich into the muscle buster position, climbs the ring steps to walk across the apron, and slams her through the door. Grace gets to her feet to beat the ten count while Slamovich could not, winning the match to retain her title.

=== Main event ===
In the main event, Josh Alexander defended the Impact World Championship against Frankie Kazarian. The two charge at each other for an intense lockup that ends up outside the floor. Back in the ring, they chain wrestle to jockey for position, ending in a standoff. Kazarian gets a Fujiwara armbar on Alexander who escapes out of it and applies a wristlock on Kazarian, who then delivers some arm drags followed by a key lock, which Alexander then goes for the ankle lock followed by a big boot. Alexander hits a backbreaker for two before landing some German suplexes, but gets sent to the outside and Kazarian catches him with a slingshot leg drop, a slingshot hurricanrana and a clothesline. Kazarian hits another slingshot leg drop on Alexander in the ring for two, followed by a fisherman's suplex for another two count, and then a swinging neckbreaker. Kazarian lands his springboard leg drop for a two count, gets caught in another German suplex by Alexander, but manages to apply an overhead belly-to-belly suplex into the turnbuckles. Alexander goes for the "C4 Spike" that gets blocked by Kazarian, so he delivers a butterfly suplex instead. Alexander sends Kazarian up high with a back body drop, and then hits ten consecutive German suplexes. Kazarian applies a chickenwing on Alexander who gets to the ropes, then goes for a flying forearm that inadvertently hits the referee. Both men crash to the outside, Kazarian grabs the Impact World Title and thinks about hitting Alexander with the belt, but Alexander's wife Jade pleas with him to not do it. Back in the ring, both men exchange each other's submission holds, with Kazarian landing a forearm that sends Alexander's mouthguard flying, and hits the Killswitch for a nearfall. On the apron, Alexander avoids Kazarian's leg drop, and hits him with a running crossbody through the ropes onto the floor. Back in the ring, Alexander hits a modified UFO powerbomb for a nearfall, gets caught by Kazarian in the chickenwing, but manages to get the ankle lock on before Kazarian reaches to the ropes, and Alexander suplexes him out of the corner. Kazarian hits the "Back to the Future" for a nearfall, avoids the Styles Clash but gets caught with a piledriver for another nearfall. Outside the ring, Alexander drags Kazarian back inside, who catches him with a slingshot cutter for a nearfall. Kazarian applies an ankle lock on Alexander, who counters into one of his own, but Kazarian grabs the bottom rope. Kazarian hits the Styles Clash for a close nearfall, sets Alexander up top for the "Flux Capacitor" who attempts to turn it into a "C4 Spike", but Kazarian back drops him into the ring, and lands a top-rope leg drop followed by a chickenwing. They begin trading nearfalls before Kazarian hits a shotgun dropkick on Alexander, who block a Tornado DDT attempt and delivers the "C4 Spike" for the win to retain his title.

After the match, Kazarian shows frustration at first, but the crowd's adulation for his effort has him shake and raise Alexander's hand in a show of respect. Bully Ray shows up with his Call Your Shot Gauntlet trophy, praises Alexander for the performance he had tonight, and called him the most credible world champion in all of professional wrestling. Ray challenges Alexander for the world title at Hard To Kill, and they shook hands. Ray attacks Alexander at ringside with multiple chair shots, zip-ties him to the bottom rope, and then grabs Alexander's wife Jade from the guardrail. Ray threatens to piledrive Jade on the concrete if Alexander does not hand him the Impact World Title. After holding up the belt, Ray shoves Jade into Alexander's arms, and teases him with a chair before leaving.

== Reception ==
Steve Cook of 411Mania reviewed the event and gave it a 7 out of 10, saying: "What we got was a couple of good hours of wrestling action with minor complaints, and a main event that is definitely worth watching." Bob Kapur of Slam Wrestling gave it 5 out of 5 stars, praising the Last Knockout Standing bout for being "a must-see slobberknocker" and "a late contender for women's match of the year" and the Impact World Title main event for not only giving both Alexander and Kazarian one of their career-best but "one of the best matches in the history of the company." He concluded that: "It's easy to "sleep on" Impact Wrestling, as the kids say. But when the company puts on a show like OverDrive, it would be a shame to do so. The show was chock full of strong matches, but the last two were simply *chef's kiss*. Go out of your way to watch this one." Kristian Thompson of TJR Wrestling gave the event an 8 out of 10, commending the "two really solid pre-show matches" and the "perfectly acceptable" undercard, but gave high praise to the final three bouts, calling it "another very good monthly special from Impact Wrestling." Darrin Lilly of Pro Wrestling Torch also highlighted the last three matches as standouts, saying the event "continues the streak of good Impact Plus specials. A fun evening of wrestling." Chris Vetter of Pro Wrestling Dot Net felt the show had a "really slow" start but picked up with the last three matches: calling the Impact World Title bout a "tremendous main event" and the Last Knockout Standing contest a "hard-hitting match" with a "fresh and innovative" finish. He critiqued that there was a "lack of suspense" when it came to the match outcomes.

== Aftermath ==
After the event, Impact announced that Josh Alexander will defend the Impact World Championship against Bully Ray in the main event of Hard To Kill. On the December 22 episode of Impact!, Alexander would be attacked by Ray, Jason Hotch, and John Skyler. Tommy Dreamer, Ray's former friend, tried to intervene, but Ray dispatched of him using a steel chair and ladder. Alexander would go to Impact Executive Vice President Scott D'Amore, demanding his match with Ray at Hard To Kill be upgraded to a Full Metal Mayhem match, which D'Amore made official.

On the December 1 episode of Impact!, New X Division Champion Trey Miguel explained what he needed to do to regain the title and defaced the title belt with green spray paint. He would continue his feud with Black Taurus on the December 15 episode of Impact!, when he went after him and his Decay partner Crazzy Steve during an entrance for a tag team match against The Major Players (Brian Myers and Matt Cardona), striking Steve with the spray paint can before tagging him, with the lingering effects causing Decay to lose their match. On the subsequent episode of Impact!, it was announced that Miguel and Taurus will have a rematch for the X Division Championship at Hard To Kill.

On the December 8 episode of Impact!, Heath and Rhino defended the Impact World Tag Team Championship against The Motor City Machine Guns (Alex Shelley and Chris Sabin), but the match went to a no contest due to interference from The Major Players (Brian Myers and Matt Cardona). The former two teams would have a rematch the following week, with Sabin pinning Rhino to earn the Guns their third Impact World Tag Team Championship.

== Results ==
No.	Results	Stipulations	Times
1^{D}	Joe Hendry (c) defeated Shera (with Raj Singh) by pinfall (Note: The match was taped for an Impact Digital Exclusive that aired on November 22.)	Singles match for the Impact Digital Media Championship	4:16
2^{P}	Rich Swann defeated Bhupinder Gujjar, Jason Hotch, Kenny King, Mike Bailey, and Yuya Uemura by pinfall	X Division Six-way match	8:06
3^{P}	The Motor City Machine Guns (Alex Shelley and Chris Sabin) defeated Bullet Club (Ace Austin and Chris Bey) by pinfall	Tag team match to determine the #1 contenders to the Impact World Tag Team Championship	13:24
4	Bully Ray defeated Moose	Tables match	10:01
5	The Death Dollz (Jessicka and Taya Valkyrie) (with Rosemary) (c) defeated Savannah Evans and Tasha Steelz by pinfall	Tag team match for the Impact Knockouts World Tag Team Championship	7:34
6	Mickie James defeated Taylor Wilde by pinfall	Career Threatening match Had Mickie James lost, she would have been forced to retire from in-ring competition.	12:29
7	Heath and Rhino (c) defeated The Major Players (Brian Myers and Matt Cardona) by pinfall	Tag team match for the Impact World Tag Team Championship	11:27
8	Trey Miguel defeated Black Taurus by pinfall	Tournament final for the vacant Impact X Division Championship	15:51
9	Jordynne Grace (c) defeated Masha Slamovich	Last Knockout Standing match for the Impact Knockouts World Championship	21:23
10	Josh Alexander (c) defeated Frankie Kazarian by pinfall	Singles match for the Impact World Championship; This was Kazarian's Option C World Championship match.	32:51
(c) / – the champion(s) heading into the match; D / – this was a dark match; P / – the match was broadcast on the pre-show

=== Impact X Division Championship Tournament ===
Quarterfinals; Before the Impact; Impact! October 21, 2022 (Aired: October 27 – November 3)
Black Taurus	Pinfall
Laredo Kid	8:05
Yuya Uemura	8:33
PJ Black	Pinfall
Alan Angels	8:17
Trey Miguel	Pinfall
Kenny King	8:44
Mike Bailey	Pinfall

Semifinals; Impact! October 22, 2022 (Aired: November 10–17)
Black Taurus	Pinfall
PJ Black	6:19
Trey Miguel	Disqualification
Mike Bailey	7:02

Final; Over Drive; November 18, 2022
Black Taurus	15:51
Trey Miguel	Pinfall
