= Slammiversary (2024) =

2024 TNA Wrestling event

- Promotional poster
- Promotion: Total Nonstop Action Wrestling
- Date: July 20, 2024
- City: Montreal, Quebec, Canada
- Venue: Verdun Auditorium
- Attendance: 4,100

Pay-per-view chronology
← Previous; Rebellion	Next → Bound for Glory

Slammiversary chronology
← Previous; 2023	Next → 2025

The 2024 Slammiversary was a professional wrestling pay-per-view (PPV) event produced by Total Nonstop Action Wrestling (TNA) that took place on July 20, 2024, at Verdun Auditorium in Montreal, Quebec, Canada. It was the 20th event under the Slammiversary chronology, and celebrated the promotion's 22nd anniversary. The event featured wrestlers from partner promotion Lucha Libre AAA Worldwide (AAA), and WWE's NXT brand; as part of a crossover between the two promotions which began earlier that Summer. It was also the first Slammiversary event to be hosted under the Total Nonstop Action Wrestling name since the 2016 event.

Twelve matches were contested at the event, including four on the pre-show. In the main event, Nic Nemeth defeated defending champion Moose, Josh Alexander, Steve Maclin, Frankie Kazarian, and Joe Hendry in a six-way elimination match to win the TNA World Championship. In other prominent matches, Jordynne Grace defeated Ash by Elegance to retain the TNA Knockouts World Championship, Mike Bailey defeated Mustafa Ali by submission to win the TNA X Division Championship, and ABC (Ace Austin and Chris Bey) defeated The System (Brian Myers and Eddie Edwards) to win the TNA World Tag Team Championship. The event also featured special appearances by Earl Hebner and Veda Scott.

== Production ==
=== Background ===
Slammiversary is a professional wrestling pay-per-view event produced by Total Nonstop Action Wrestling (TNA) to celebrate the anniversary of the company's first event, which was held on June 19, 2002. As such, the event is usually held in the summer (June or July). The first event took place nearly a year after that event on June 18, 2003, and has since been considered one of Impact's premiere PPV events, along with Bound for Glory and – since 2020 – Hard To Kill, and Rebellion.

On April 20, 2024, at Rebellion, it was announced by TNA that Slammiversary would take place on July 20, 2024, at Verdun Auditorium in Montreal, Quebec, Canada.

=== Storylines ===
Other on-screen personnel
Role:	Name:
Commentators	Tom Hannifan
Commentators	Matthew Rehwoldt
Ring announcer	Jennifer Chung
Referees	Daniel Spencer
Referees	Paige Prinzivalli
Referees	Frank Gastineau
Interviewer	Gia Miller

The event featured several professional wrestling matches, which involve different wrestlers from pre-existing scripted feuds, plots, and storylines. Wrestlers portray heroes, villains, or less distinguishable characters in scripted events that built tension and culminate in a wrestling match or series of matches. Storylines were produced on the company's weekly programs, Impact! and Xplosion.

On the June 20 episode of TNA Impact!, TNA Director of Authority Santino Marella announced the "Road to Slammiversary Series," where five singles matches would take place over the next few weeks. The winner of each match would go on to Slammiversary to challenge TNA World Champion Moose in a six-way elimination match. The Road to Slammiversary began that same episode, with Josh Alexander defeating Eric Young to qualify. The following week, Steve Maclin and Nic Nemeth qualified by defeating Sami Callihan and Rich Swann, respectively. And the week after, Frankie Kazarian and Joe Hendry defeated Mike Santana and Jake Something, respectively, to earn the final two spots in the match.

At Hard To Kill, Ash by Elegance (formerly Dana Brooke in WWE), was spotted in the crowd during the TNA Knockouts World Championship match between Jordynne Grace and Trinity, the former defeating the latter to win the title. Since then, the newly signed Ash took to sitting ringside for Grace's title matches, scouting potential competition. Ash would even return to WWE at NXT Battleground during Grace's match with NXT Women's Champion Roxanne Perez, preventing Tatum Paxley from stealing the Knockouts World Championship before being hit with it by Grace. Five days later at Against All Odds, after Grace retained her title against Paxley in an open challenge, Ash tried getting physical with Grace for the first time but was unsuccessful. However, on the subsequent episode of TNA Impact!, Ash tried sending a message to Grace after a victory, putting her opponent down with Grace's finisher, the Juggernaut Driver. This brought Grace to the ring, but she was laid out by Ash, who then held the Knockouts World Championship over a fallen Grace. On the next week's episode, a furious Grace granted Ash a title match for that night, but the latter's "Personal Concierge" declared that the two would have their match at Slammiversary instead, which TNA made official. It was later announced that their match would be sponsored by the upcoming Detained movie.

On the May 23 TNA Impact!, Mike Bailey and Trent Seven faced off to see who would challenge Mustafa Ali for the TNA X Division Championship at Against All Odds. Near the end of the match, Ali, who came out to sit ringside and was inadvertently knocked down by Bailey, tried to lunge at the latter, who was perched on the top turnbuckle. This allowed Champagne Singh, who would later join Ali as "Campaign Singh," to shove Bailey off and allow Seven to pick up the win and earn the title shot. At Against All Odds, however, before their match, Seven revealed unseen footage from Ali's interview with Tom Hannifan a few weeks ago, where Ali disavowed and dismissed his hometown of Chicago, where the show was being held. Regardless, Ali was able to defend his title against Seven. Two weeks later on the June 27 TNA Impact!, Ali held a "State of the Union Address" to discuss the footage from Against All Odds, trying to pass it off as AI-generated slander. However, several fans began heckling Ali by chanting for Mike Bailey, who many believe Ali to be avoiding. Ali tried to have the fans escorted from the arena. But, when one of them threw water in Ali's face, he snapped and attacked the fan, before being stopped by Speedball Mountain (Bailey and Seven). Angered at the injunction and believing Bailey had ruined his return to Chicago, Ali threatened to ruin Bailey's return to Montreal as he challenged him to an X Division Championship match at Slammiversary. However, the following week, Ali confronted Santino Marella to call off the match, saying that Bailey hadn't earned it. Marella reluctantly agreed and made a three-way number one contender's match for next week between Bailey, Kushida, and Jonathan Gresham to determine Ali's Slammiversary challenger. Nonetheless, Bailey would pin Gresham in the match to earn his X Division Title opportunity.

For the past month, Fir$t Cla$$ (TNA Digital Media Champion A. J. Francis and Rich Swann) took to mocking the budding romance between PCO and Steph De Lander, starting on the June 13 TNA Impact! when they took the black rose PCO had given De Lander before being attacked by PCO. This later led to a match between PCO and Swann at Against All Odds, which PCO won despite interference from Francis. It was after the match that De Lander accepted PCO's offer for a date, which the two had in-ring on the following TNA Impact! Unfortunately, Fir$t Cla$$ crashed the date, attacking and tying PCO to the ropes before Francis chokeslammed De Lander through a table. Fir$t Cla$$ continued to mock PCO the following week, when Francis, with the help of DJ Whoo Kid, purchased the Canadian International Heavyweight Championship, a retired title that had been defended during the 1970s and 80s in PCO's native Quebec, and upon gaining ownership of the title, Francis revived it as an active championship and declared himself as champion. The week after, Santino Marella confronted Fir$t Cla$$ and announced that Francis would face PCO at Slammiversary for the Canadian International Heavyweight Championship and the TNA Digital Media Championship.

At Under Siege, The Malisha (Alisha Edwards and Masha Slamovich) defeated Spitfire (Dani Luna and Jody Threat) to win the TNA Knockouts World Tag Team Championship. As The Malisha continued their reign, Spitfire, under the direction of their mentor Lars Frederiksen, had competed in several trial matches before they would invoke their rematch clause. The final trial was a 10-minute challenge match between Luna and Threat on the July 4 episode of TNA Impact! that ended in a time-limit draw. They were granted five extra minutes to finish the match, but The Malisha ran out to attack Spitfire. On July 9, TNA announced on their website that Spitfire would have their rematch against The Malisha for the Knockouts World Tag Team Championship on the Countdown to Slammiversary pre-show.

At Sacrifice, The System's Brian Myers and Eddie Edwards defeated ABC (Ace Austin and Chris Bey) to win the TNA World Tag Team Championship. For the next few months, while The System continued to reign, ABC began showing signs of dissolution, with miscues in their tag team matches and brief forays in singles competition. But the two had worked it out in the past month and began calling for their title rematch. After The System retained the TNA World Tag Team Championship against The Hardys ("Broken" Matt Hardy and Jeff Hardy) on the July 18 TNA Impact!, TNA announced that they would now defend them against ABC at Slammiversary.

The TNA World Tag Team Championship match on the July 18 episode ended in disqualification when System associate JDC shoved Jeff Hardy off the top rope. JDC, Myers, and Edwards would conduct a post-match assault on The Hardys, forcing Matt to watch Jeff thrown into the ring post with a chair around his neck. As Jeff was stretchered out of the arena, Tommy Dreamer pulled Matt to a scene where his wife Rebecca Hardy was attacked by who she claims was JDC. As a result of these attacks, Matt would now face JDC at Slammiversary.

On the July 4 episode of TNA Impact, NXT wrestler Charlie Dempsey interrupted a match between Zachary Wentz and Leon Slater, attacking both men as well as Wentz's Rascalz partner Trey Miguel. The Rascalz would return the favor by appearing on the July 9 episode of NXT, reuniting with former partner Wes Lee (Dezmond Xavier in TNA, then known as Impact Wrestling). Three days later on TNA Impact!, Dempsey defeated Wentz due to a distraction by Dempsey's No Quarter Catch Crew (NQCC) stablemate Myles Borne, who attacked Miguel. The following week, NQCC (Dempsey, Borne, and Tavion Heights) would defeat The Rascalz (Miguel and Wentz) and Kushida in a six-man tag team match. In the following segment, Lee, appearing on TNA television for the first time in over three years, meets Miguel and Wentz in their "treehouse," challenging NQCC to a match at Slammiversary. TNA would officially announce the match later in the night.

On July 18, during the press conference for Slammiversary, a four-way match was announced to take place on the event between Faby Apache, Gisele Shaw, Tasha Steelz, and Xia Brookside.

==== Changed match ====
Following Hard To Kill, Jonathan Gresham appeared via vignette in therapy sessions, growing obsessed with the "masks" people wore to hide their true selves. It was during these sessions that a new character for Gresham began haunting him, a black-masked figure dubbed "The Octopus." Gresham, as The Octopus, returned to action at Under Siege, defeating Kushida with a mandible claw with his hand coated in black "ink" he spewed from his mouth. This ink was later revealed to have sickened Kushida on the May 17 episode of TNA Xplosion. It also caused the referees for Gresham's matches to be sickened at the slightest contact, causing those who officiate his matches to be gloved and masked. A month later on the Countdown to Against All Odds, Gresham faced Sami Callihan where near the end of the match, Kushida ran down and swabbed Gresham's ink from his mouth with a towel, which he took back to Japan to find a cure for it. On the July 18 episode of TNA Impact!, Gresham lured Kushida away from his six-man tag team match, causing his team to lose. TNA later announced the two would face each other once again on the Countdown to Slammiversary. However, on July 20, TNA announced that due to travel issues, Gresham would be unable to compete at Slammiversary and would be replaced by Rich Swann.

== Results ==
No.	Results	Stipulations	Times
1^{D}	Carl Leduc won by last eliminating Zak Patterson (Note: The other participants in elimination order: Stan Francisco, Keven Gray, Jason Gray, Steve Ace, Joey Valentyne, Franky Mack, The Green Phantom, Marquise Wild Card, Eric Mastrocola, Xander, Chase Ironside, Mathis Myre, Mike Hart, Firestorm, Pee Wee, Pickton, Max Lemire and Yayne Harrison.)	20-man Battle Royal	5:45
2^{P}	Tasha Steelz defeated Faby Apache, Gisele Shaw and Xia Brookside by pinfall	Four-way match	6:20
3^{P}	Kushida defeated Rich Swann by submission	Singles match	6:45
4^{P}	The Malisha (Alisha Edwards and Masha Slamovich) (c) defeated Spitfire (Dani Luna and Jody Threat) by pinfall	Tag team match for the TNA Knockouts World Tag Team Championship	8:45
5^{P}	Eric Young defeated Hammerstone by pinfall	Singles match	5:25
6	"Broken" Matt Hardy defeated JDC by pinfall	Singles match	4:40
7	ABC (Ace Austin and Chris Bey) defeated The System (Brian Myers and Eddie Edwards) (c) (with Alisha Edwards) by pinfall	Tag team match for the TNA World Tag Team Championship	16:50
8	Mike Santana defeated Jake Something by pinfall	Singles match	11:40
9	The Rascalz (Trey Miguel, Wes Lee, and Zachary Wentz) defeated No Quarter Catch Crew (Charlie Dempsey, Myles Borne, and Tavion Heights) by pinfall	Six-man tag team match	14:10
10	PCO defeated A. J. Francis (c) (with Rich Swann, Smoke DZA, and Josh Bishop) by pinfall	Montreal Street Fight for the TNA Digital Media Championship and the Canadian International Heavyweight Championship	13:45
11	Jordynne Grace (c) defeated Ash by Elegance (with The Personal Concierge) by pinfall	Singles match for the TNA Knockouts World Championship	12:10
12	Mike Bailey defeated Mustafa Ali (c) (with Campaign Singh) by submission	Singles match for the TNA X Division Championship	20:30
13	Nic Nemeth defeated Moose (c), Josh Alexander, Steve Maclin, Frankie Kazarian, and Joe Hendry	Six-way elimination match for the TNA World Championship	30:55
(c) / – the champion(s) heading into the match; D / – this was a dark match; P / – the match was broadcast on the pre-show

=== TNA World Championship match ===
Eliminated	Wrestler	Eliminated by	Method of elimination	Time
1	Steve Maclin	Moose	Pinned after the Lights Out Spear	10:45
2	Moose (c)	Joe Hendry	Pinned after the Standing Ovation	21:40
3	Joe Hendry	Josh Alexander	Pinned after the C4 Spike	22:45
4	Josh Alexander	Nic Nemeth	Pinned after a superkick	28:50
5	Frankie Kazarian	Nic Nemeth	Pinned after the Danger Zone	30:55
Winner	Nic Nemeth	—		30:55
