= Throwback Throwdown II =

2021 Impact Wrestling event

- Promotional poster
- Promotion: Impact Wrestling
- Date: December 18, 2021
- City: Louisville, Kentucky
- Venue: Davis Arena
- Tagline: IPWF Presents: Winter War '84

Impact Plus Monthly Specials chronology
← Previous; Turning Point	Next → No Surrender

Throwback Throwdown chronology
← Previous; I	Next → III

Throwback Throwdown II was the second annual Throwback Throwdown professional wrestling event produced by Impact Wrestling that aired on Impact Plus and YouTube. It took place on December 18, 2021, at Davis Arena in Louisville, Kentucky, the home base of Impact's developmental territory Ohio Valley Wrestling (OVW), whose talent was also featured on the card.

This was the final in-ring appearance for Impact for Rohit Raju, who left the company at the end of the year.

== Production ==
=== Background ===
The first Throwback Throwdown was a special episode of Impact that aired on November 26, 2019, and saw wrestlers portraying 1980's characters and gimmicks in the fictional Impact Provincial Wrestling Federation (IPWF). On November 20, 2021, at Turning Point, Impact announced that Throwback Throwdown II would be held at Davis Arena in Louisville, Kentucky on December 18, 2021, as an Impact Plus Monthly Special.

=== Storylines ===
The event featured several professional wrestling matches, and wrestlers portray heroes, villains, or less distinguishable characters. Due to the nature of the event, the storylines for Throwback Throwdown II were self-contained and independent from the rest of Impact's programming.

== Results ==
No.	Results	Stipulations	Times
1^{D}	Sex Ferguson (Doc Gallows) defeated Downtown Daddy Brown (Willie Mack) (c) by pinfall	Empty Arena match for the IPWF International Commonwealth Television Championship (Digital Exclusive shown on 12/21)	6:00
2^{P}	Duke Winchester (Sam Beale) defeated Mr. E (Jackson Stone) by pinfall	Singles match	3:46
3	Chad 2 Badd (Karl Anderson) defeated Bill Ding (Trey Miguel) by pinfall	Singles match	6:37
4	The Rhythmic Warriors (Johnny Swinger and Mikey Swinger (Mike Jackson)) defeated The Sunday Morning Express (Editor-in-Chief (Chris Sabin) and Ace Reporter (KarDaniel Dunn)) by pinfall	Tag team match	6:13
5	Frank the Butcher (Rhino) defeated Rip Rayzor (Ace Austin) (with Rusty Iron (Gia Miller)) by pinfall	Singles match	5:05
6	Georgia Cobb (Jordynne Grace) defeated Ladybird Johnston (Havok) by pinfall	Singles match	6:16
7	Giuseppe Scovelli Jr. (Josh Mathews) defeated Quincy Cosmos (Rohit Raju) by pinfall	Singles match	4:34
8	Harry Hall (Jake Something) defeated Badlands Bart (Larry D)	Four Corners Bullrope match	7:51
9	Ima Belle (Deonna Purrazzo) defeated Rusty Iron (Gia Miller) (with Rip Rayzor (Ace Austin)) by pinfall	Singles match	5:38
10	Tim Burr (Josh Alexander) defeated Eric The Red Wood (W. Morrissey) by pinfall	Singles match	5:23
11	Jazzy Fitbody (Madison Rayne) defeated Wanda the Werewoman (Savannah Evans) by disqualification	Singles match	4:46
12	S.T.O.M.P. in Paradise (GI Broski (Matt Cardona) and Brian Bone-Crunchin (Brian Myers)) defeated The Russians (Sergey the Siberian (Madman Fulton) and The Stalingrad Strangler (Tony Gunn)) by pinfall	Tag team match	10:04
13	Santa Claus (Note: After the match, Santa Claus removed his mask to reveal that he was in fact Downtown Daddy Brown.) (Willie Mack) defeated Sex Ferguson (Doc Gallows) (c) by pinfall	North Pole Street Fight for the IPWF International Commonwealth Television Championship	10:05
(c) / – the champion(s) heading into the match; D / – this was a dark match; P / – the match was broadcast on the pre-show
