= Hard To Kill (2022) =

2022 Impact Wrestling pay-per-view event

- Promotional poster featuring Matt Cardona, Moose, and W. Morrissey
- Promotion: Impact Wrestling
- Date: January 8, 2022
- City: Dallas, Texas
- Venue: The Factory in Deep Ellum
- Buy rate: 4,400

Pay-per-view chronology
| ← Previous; Bound for Glory | Next → Multiverse of Matches |

Hard to Kill chronology
| ← Previous; 2021 | Next → 2023 |

The 2022 Hard To Kill was a professional wrestling pay-per-view (PPV) event produced by Impact Wrestling. It took place on January 8, 2022, at The Factory in Deep Ellum in Dallas, Texas. It was the third event under the Hard To Kill chronology.

10 matches were contested at the event, with two matches contested on the pre-show and one match taped as a digital exclusive. In the main event, Mickie James defeated Deonna Purrazzo in a Texas Deathmatch to retain the Impact Knockouts Championship. In other prominent matches, Moose defeated Matt Cardona and W. Morrissey in a three-way match to retain the Impact World Championship, Trey Miguel defeated Steve Maclin to retain the Impact X Division Championship, Jonathan Gresham defeated Chris Sabin to retain the ROH World Championship, and Josh Alexander defeated Jonah.

The event featured appearances by several notable Ring of Honor (ROH) talents and personnel including Matt Taven, Rok-C, and Vincent, and the returns of Jonathan Gresham, Maria Kanellis, Mike Bennett, and PCO. Hard To Kill was also notable for the debut of Tom Hannifan (formerly known as Tom Phillips in WWE) as Impact's play-by-play commentator.

== Production ==
=== Background ===
At Bound for Glory, Impact Wrestling announced Hard To Kill would take place on January 8, 2022, in Dallas, Texas. On November 3, it was announced that event will take place from The Bomb Factory.

=== Storylines ===
The event featured professional wrestling matches that involved different wrestlers from pre-existing scripted feuds and storylines. Wrestlers portrayed villains, heroes, or less distinguishable characters in scripted events that built tension and culminated in a wrestling match or series of matches. Storylines were produced on Impact's weekly television program.

At Bound for Glory, Mickie James defeated Deonna Purrazzo to win the Impact Knockouts Championship. Purrazzo would go silent for the better part of a month, returning on the November 18 episode of Impact, where she would have a sit-down interview with Gia Miller, giving short answers to all of her questions until being asked about her next move, and she would simply say that the audience will have to wait and see for what would be next. At Turning Point, after James successfully defended the Knockouts Championship against Mercedes Martinez, Purrazzo attacked James and announced that she would invoke her rematch clause at Hard To Kill. On the December 16 episode of Impact!, after a physical altercation during a meet and greet, it was announced that they will face off in a Texas Deathmatch.

At Turning Point, Impact Executive Vice President Scott D'Amore announced the first ever Knockouts Ultimate X match, where the winner would become the next contender to the Impact Knockouts Championship. On the December 9 episode of Impact!, newly-minted Knockouts executive Gail Kim announced the participants to be the following: Chelsea Green, Jordynne Grace, Lady Frost, Rachael Ellering, Rosemary, and Tasha Steelz. On January 6, 2022, Impact announced that Alisha Edwards will take the place of Ellering, with no reason has yet to be given.

At Turning Point, W. Morrissey defeated Matt Cardona thanks to interference from Impact World Champion Moose, while later in the night, Moose successfully defended the title against Eddie Edwards in a Full Metal Mayhem match. During that match, Cardona and Morrissey interfered on behalf of Edwards and Moose, respectively, before the two would brawl again. On the December 2 episode of Impact!, Cardona opened the show to call out Moose, to which the champion would say that Cardona would never become a top star, questioned if he truly wanted to wrestle him, and regarded him as a "mid-carder". Moose and Morrissey would go on to attack Cardona before Edwards ran in to save the latter. Later that night, Edwards and Cardona defeated Moose and Morrissey in a tag team match after Cardona pinned Moose with a roll-up. After the match, Morrissey laid Moose out with a boot, making it clear that he wanted the Impact World Championship match Moose had promised him for weeks. Later, it was announced that Moose will defend the Impact World Championship against Cardona and Morrissey in a three-way match at Hard To Kill.

At Turning Point, Jonah made his debut, attacking Josh Alexander and leaving him bloodied. On the December 9 episode of Impact!, Scott D'Amore announced Josh Alexander would face Jonah at Hard To Kill.

On December 23, Impact announced that ROH World Champion Jonathan Gresham would defend his title at Hard To Kill against Chris Sabin.

At Bound for Glory, Trey Miguel defeated Steve Maclin and El Phantasmo, the latter being who he pinned, in a three-way match to win the vacant Impact X Division Championship. Maclin took exception to this, as while he technically lost his undefeated streak, he was yet to be pinned or submitted in singles competition. As such, he earned another opportunity at the title, facing Miguel and Laredo Kid, who he beat to enter the match, at Turning Point. There, Miguel attempted a double pin on Kid and Maclin. Maclin was able to kick out while Kid did not, meaning Miguel retained the title. Maclin would later walk up to Scott D'Amore, demanding one more match, but was denied. So in retaliation, on the December 16 episode of Impact!, Maclin jumped Miguel from behind before binding and gagging him backstage. This led Miguel to instead demand a match with Maclin, which was granted and would take place at Hard To Kill. On the January 6 episode of Impact!, an added stipulation stated that if Maclin lost, he would not get another title opportunity as long as Miguel was champion.

On December 21, Impact announced the return of Hardcore War at Hard To Kill, pitting Eddie Edwards, Rich Swann, Willie Mack, Heath and Rhino against Impact World Tag Team Champions The Good Brothers (Doc Gallows and Karl Anderson) and Violent By Design (Eric Young, Deaner, and Joe Doering). On the January 6 episode of Impact!, Anderson defeated Heath in a match to determine which team had the numbers advantage in Hardcore War.

==== Canceled match ====
On the December 2 episode of Impact!, Tenille Dashwood returned from hiatus and reunited with The Influence (Madison Rayne and Kaleb with a K), before getting back together with the Impact Knockouts Tag Team Champions The IInspiration (Cassie Lee and Jessie McKay) and uniting the two teams. The following week on Impact!, they lost an intergender tag team match against Decay (Rosemary, Havok, Black Taurus, and Crazzy Steve). On December 22, Impact announced that The IInspiration will defend the Knockouts Tag Team Championship against The Influence at Hard To Kill. On the day before the event, however, Impact announced that the match was canceled due to The IInspiration having come into contact with someone who tested positive for COVID-19.

== Event ==
Other on-screen personnel
| Commentators | Tom Hannifan |
| Commentators | D'Lo Brown |
| Commentators | Ian Riccaboni (ROH World Championship match) |
| Ring announcers | David Penzer |
| Ring announcers | Bobby Cruise (ROH World Championship match) |
| Referees | Brian Hebner |
| Referees | Brandon Tolle |
| Referees | Daniel Spencer |
| Interviewer | Gia Miller |

=== Digital Media Exclusive Match ===
Before the event went live on pay-per-view, Havok defeated Savannah Evans which was aired as an Impact Digital Exclusive on January 11.

=== Countdown to Hard To Kill ===
During the Hard To Kill pre-show, Jake Something faced Madman Fulton. In the end, Something performed a Blackhole Slam on Fulton to win the match.

Also on the pre-show, Ace Austin, Chris Bey, Laredo Kid and Mike Bailey battled in a four-way match. In the end Bailey performed a shooting star knee drop to the back on Austin to win the match in his debut on Impact Wrestling.

=== Preliminary matches ===
The actual pay-per-view started with the inaugural Knockouts Ultimate X match, between Alisha Edwards, Chelsea Green, Jordynne Grace, Lady Frost, Rosemary and Tasha Steelz, where the winner would become the number one contender for the Knockouts Championship. As Grace, Green and Steelz crawled over the cables to reach over the X, Steelz was able to knock down Grace, and capture the X before Green, thus won the match and became the number one contender for the Knockouts Championship.

Next, Trey Miguel defended the X Division Championship against Steve Maclin. after Miguel took Maclin down with a brainbuster, he climbed to the top turnbuckle and performed a diving meteora to win the match and to retain the title.

After that, Jonathan Gresham defended the ROH World Championship against Chris Sabin in a Pure Rules match. After back and forth pinning attempts, Gresham got the upper hand after he pinned Sabin in a bridge variation to retain the title.

In the seventh match, Jonah faced Josh Alexander. Early in the match, Jonah's left leg was caught in the rope, which became a target for Alexander. After several ankle-locks attempts, Alexander managed to submit Jonah.

The next match saw a 10-man Hardcore War between the team of Eddie Edwards, Heath, Rhino, Rich Swann and Willie Mack against the team of The Good Brothers (Doc Gallows and Karl Anderson) and Violent By Design (Deaner, Eric Young and Joe Doering). In this match, two wrestlers would start for three minutes, and every 90 seconds, a new entrant would join the match. In the end, Rhino gored Anderson, followed by Heath pinning him to win the match for his team. After the match, Matt Taven, Mike Bennett, PCO and Vincent, all who worked for Ring of Honor (ROH), attacked the winning team as they were accompanied by Maria Kanellis.

In the penultimate match, Moose defended the Impact World Championship against Matt Cardona and W. Morrissey in a three-way match. In the end, Moose speared Cardona to win the match and retain the title.

=== Main event ===
In the main event, Mickie James defended the Knockouts Championship against Deonna Purrazzo in a Texas Deathmatch. In this match, the wrestlers had ten seconds to get to their feet after a pinfall. After James pinned Purrazzo with the Mickie-DT, James put a chair and a broken table over Purrazzo to prevent her to stand up, and as Purrazzo failed to do so, James officially won the match and retained the title.

== Aftermath ==
On the January 13 episode of Impact!, Deonna Purrazzo successfully defended the AAA Reina de Reinas Championship in a Winner Takes All match against the ROH Women's World Champion Rok-C, winning the Women's World Championship in the process to become a double champion.

== Results ==
| No. | Results | Stipulations | Times |
|---|---|---|---|
| 1^{D} | Havok defeated Savannah Evans by pinfall (Note: The match was taped for an Impact Digital Exclusive that aired on January 11.) | Singles match | 4:37 |
| 2^{P} | Jake Something defeated Madman Fulton by pinfall | Singles match | 5:25 |
| 3^{P} | "Speedball" Mike Bailey defeated Ace Austin, Chris Bey, and Laredo Kid by pinfall | X Division Four-way match | 8:10 |
| 4 | Tasha Steelz defeated Alisha Edwards, Chelsea Green, Jordynne Grace, Lady Frost, and Rosemary | Inaugural Knockouts Ultimate X match Winner became the #1 contender for the Impact Knockouts Championship. | 9:00 |
| 5 | Trey Miguel (c) defeated Steve Maclin by pinfall | Last Chance match for the Impact X Division Championship; Since Maclin lost, he could no longer challenge for the title as long as Trey Miguel is champion. | 12:50 |
| 6 | Jonathan Gresham (c) defeated Chris Sabin by pinfall | Pure Rules match for the ROH World Championship | 12:40 |
| 7 | Josh Alexander defeated Jonah by submission | Singles match | 17:05 |
| 8 | Eddie Edwards, Rich Swann, Willie Mack, Heath and Rhino defeated The Good Brothers (Doc Gallows and Karl Anderson) and Violent By Design (Deaner, Eric Young and Joe Doering) by pinfall | 10-man Hardcore War | 23:25 |
| 9 | Moose (c) defeated Matt Cardona and W. Morrissey by pinfall | Three-way match for the Impact World Championship | 16:00 |
| 10 | Mickie James (c) defeated Deonna Purrazzo | Texas Deathmatch for the Impact Knockouts Championship; Had Matthew Rehwoldt interfered during the match, Deonna Purrazzo would have been disqualified and Rehwoldt would have been fired. | 19:40 |
(c) / – the champion(s) heading into the match; D / – this was a dark match; P / – the match was broadcast on the pre-show
