= Throwback Throwdown =

Impact Wrestling event series

- Promotions: Impact Wrestling
- First event: Throwback Throwdown (2019)

Throwback Throwdown is a professional wrestling Impact Plus event, produced by American professional wrestling promotion Impact Wrestling. The event was created in 2019 and since its inception, the event features wrestlers portraying 1980s characters and gimmicks in the fictional Impact Provincial Wrestling Federation (IPWF). Each event features talent from Impact competing in various professional wrestling match types. Due to the nature of the event, the storylines for Throwback Throwdown have been self-contained and independent from the rest of Impact's programming.

== History ==
Throwback Throwdown is a professional wrestling event consisting of a main event and undercard that feature championship matches and other various matches. The first Throwback Throwdown was a special episode of Impact that aired on November 26, 2019 and saw wrestlers portraying 1980s characters and gimmicks in the fictional Impact Provincial Wrestling Federation (IPWF). Throwback Throwdown II was held at Davis Arena in Louisville, Kentucky on December 18, 2021 as an Impact Plus Monthly Special. On November 2, 2022, Impact announced that Throwback Throwdown III would take place on November 25 at Benton Convention Center in Winston-Salem, North Carolina as a part of WrestleCade, with the matches from that event set to air on December 2 as an Impact Plus Monthly Special. On September 26, 2023, Impact announced that Throwback Throwdown IV would take place on November 11 at Don Kolov Arena in Mississauga, Ontario, Canada as a television special.

== Events ==
#	Event	Date	City	Venue	Main Event	Notes	Ref
1	Throwback Throwdown (2019)	October 27, 2019 (aired November 26, 2019)	Mississauga, Ontario, Canada	Don Kolov Arena	Julian Cumberbun (Ethan Page) vs. Downtown Daddy Brown (Willie Mack) in a Loser Leaves Town match for the IPWF International Commonwealth Television Championship	Aired as a special episode of Impact!.	
2	Throwback Throwdown II	December 18, 2021	Louisville, Kentucky	Davis Arena	Santa Claus (Note: After the match, Santa Claus removed his mask to reveal that he was in fact Downtown Daddy Brown.) (Willie Mack) vs. Sex Ferguson (Doc Gallows) in a North Pole Street Fight for the IPWF International Commonwealth Television Championship		
3	Throwback Throwdown III	November 25, 2022 (aired December 2, 2022)	Winston-Salem, North Carolina	Benton Convention Center	Team Impact Provincial Wrestling Federation ("Cowboy" Colt McCoy (Eddie Edwards), Tim Burr (Josh Alexander), Frank the Butcher (Rhino), and Giuseppe Scovelli Jr. (Josh Mathews)) defeated Team Great Lakes Unionized Wrestling (Devon Damon (Crowbar), Neptune (Shera), Lord Humongous (Big Kon), and Manfred The Mad Mammal (Beer City Bruiser)) in an eight-man elimination tag team match		
4	Throwback Throwdown IV	November 11, 2023 (aired November 30, 2023)	Mississauga, Ontario, Canada	Don Kolov Arena	Tim Burr (Josh Alexander) vs. Boris Alexiev (Santino Marella)	Aired as a special episode of Impact!	
