= Don Kolov Arena =

- Interactive map of Don Kolov Arena
- Location: 4880 Tomken Road, Mississauga, Ontario L4W 1K1; Canada
- Coordinates: 43.669°N 79.645°W
- Owner: Anthony Carelli; Steven Ewaschuk; Anna Babij

Construction
- Opened: 2013

Tenants
- Battle Arts Academy/Battle Arts Professional Wrestling (2013–present); Destiny Pro Wrestling (2014–present)

Website
- https://battleartsacademy.ca/events

The Don Kolov Arena is an arena located in Mississauga, Ontario, Canada and is primarily used for professional wrestling, boxing, and mixed martial arts events. The arena is also home to the Battle Arts Academy, a martial arts training facility co-owned by Anthony Carelli, better known by his professional wrestling ring name Santino Marella.

== History ==
In 2013, Santino Marella opened the Battle Arts Academy along with the Don Kolov Arena which was named after his trainer Don Kolov, a Canadian professional wrestler who had previously wrestled in the World Wrestling Federation (WWF), Maple Leaf Wrestling (MLW), and Stampede Wrestling. On December 19, 2015, Battle Arts taped a television pilot for an unaired weekly television show at the arena. On November 18, 2016, Battle Arts teamed up with Border City Wrestling (BCW) and Destiny Pro Wrestling to present the Ontario Super Series supercard event at the arena.

On March 4, 2018, Impact Wrestling, Border City Wrestling, and Destiny World Wrestling taped the Last Chancery special at the arena which aired on Twitch on March 9, 2018. On June 3, 2018, Impact Wrestling returned to the Don Kolov Arena to tape the One Night Only: Zero Fear pay-per-view which aired on June 15, 2018 on the Global Wrestling Network.

On July 14, 2019, Impact Wrestling returned to the Don Kolov Arena to tape the first ever Mash-Up tournament which aired as a special episode of Impact. The main event of the taping was a four-way tag team elimination match between the teams of Sami Callihan and Tessa Blanchard, Eddie Edwards and Moose, Jake Crist and Wentz, and Michael Elgin and Willie Mack.

On October 27, 2019, the first Throwback Throwdown special was taped at the arena which featured Impact Wrestling and independent wrestlers portraying 1980s-style characters and gimmicks in the fictional Impact Provincial Wrestling Federation (IPWF). The special aired on November 26, 2019 as a special episode of Impact on AXS TV.

On December 3, 2023, Ohio Valley Wrestling made its Canadian debut when they teamed up with Destiny Wrestling to present the Destiny x OVW event at the arena.

On December 9, 2023, Impact Wrestling held their final Impact Plus special titled Final Resolution, before rebranding back to Total Nonstop Action Wrestling at the arena with the main event being Zack Sabre Jr. and Josh Alexander fighting against the Motor City Machine Guns (Alex Shelley and Chris Sabin).
