= Cody Deaner =

Canadian professional wrestler (born 1982)

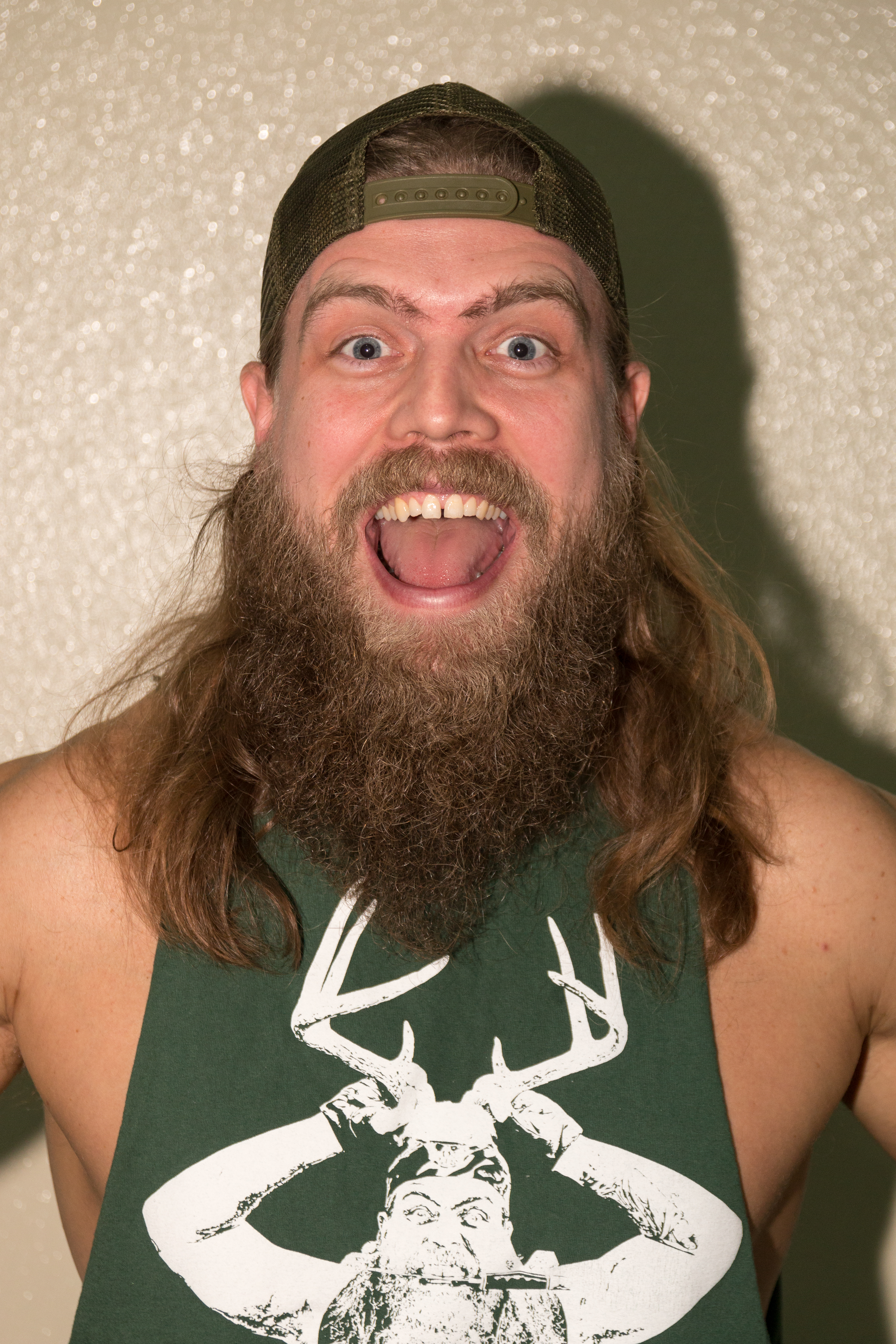
- Deaner in 2016

Personal information
- Born: Christopher Gray; March 7, 1982 (age 44) Port Bruce, Ontario, Canada

Professional wrestling career
- Ring name(s): Cody Deaner; Cody Steele; Deaner; The Home Town Man
- Billed height: 6 ft 0 in (1.83 m)
- Billed weight: 212 lb (96 kg)
- Billed from: Muscle Shoals, Alabama; Niagara Falls, Ontario; Tempe, Arizona (as The Home Town Man)
- Trained by: Derek Wilde
- Debut: January 24, 2000

Christopher Gray (born March 7, 1982), better known by his ring name Cody Deaner, is a Canadian professional wrestler. He is currently signed with Total Nonstop Action Wrestling (TNA), where he performs under the ring name The Home Town Man. He previously competed under the ring name Deaner (a shortened version of his previous ring name) as the leader of The Design. He is a former two-time Impact World Tag Team Champion with Eric Young and Joe Doering (as Violent By Design), holding the titles under the Freebird rule. He also makes appearances on the independent circuit.

== Professional wrestling career ==
=== Independent circuit (2000–present) ===
Gray was trained by "Dangerboy" Derek Wylde in Niagara Falls, Ontario, and subsequently made his professional wrestling debut for the now defunct Hardcore Wrestling Federation in 2000 under the ring name Cody Steele. Upon the HWF's closure, he then wrestled for numerous Canadian and American independent wrestling promotions, winning numerous titles across both countries.

He had a number of WWE tryouts under the Cody Steele moniker, including an appearance on SmackDown!.

As Cody Steele, Gray won numerous independent wrestling titles across the US and Canada. He held gold for a number of promotions including: Fighting Spirit Pro Wrestling, Neo Spirit Pro Wrestling, Canadian International Wrestling Alliance, Great Lakes Championship Wrestling, Pro Wrestling Xtreme, Great Canadian Wrestling, and others. Other independent wrestling promotions he has wrestled for include Border City Wrestling, Ballpark Brawl, Pier 6 Wrestling, Empire State Wrestling, International Wrestling Federation, NWA-Empire, NWA-Upstate, AWA-Ontario, Twins Wrestling Entertainment, Classic Championship Wrestling, WAR Wrestling, and Prime Time Wrestling.

In 2005, Gray began wrestling in the newly founded independent promotion, Great Canadian Wrestling (GCW). He made his GCW debut at a GCW event on June 26 as "Completely" Cody Steele, defeating Derek Wylde. At Rage of the Cage, he began wrestling as Cody Deaner and lost to Shawn Spears in the main event. At Stampede Showdown, Deaner was booked to defeat Hayden "The Destroyer" Avery for his newly won GCW Ontario Independent Championship. As a result, Deaner began feuding with Avery for the title. Deaner held the title for three months before losing it back to Avery at Ugandan Invasion. At Veni! Vidi! Vici, Avery defeated Deaner in a Motorcity Street Fight rematch to retain the title.

At Beyond the Limit, Deaner and Avery ended their feud as they teamed up to defeat defending champions Derek Wylde & Andrew Davis and Ash & Otis Idol in a triple threat tag team match for the GCW Tag Team Championship. Shortly after the title win, Deaner and Avery began feuding with The Flatliners (Asylum and Matt Burns) for the belts and defeated them in several matches throughout the rest of the year, before losing the tag championships to Flatliners at Genesis 11:25:07. The feud between the teams continued, until Deaner and Avery regained the titles from Flatliners in a steel cage tag team match at Game Over. They lost the titles to The Houses of Virtue (Andrew Davis and Sebastian Suave) at Random Acts of Violence. After losing the belts, Deaner and Avery continued to team up and challenged for the titles but failed in winning them, so they broke up their tag team and focused on singles competition.

In the fall of 2008, Deaner was put into a feud with the GCW National Champion Otis Idol over the belt, which culminated in a series of matches but Deaner failed to win it. Their feud ended after Idol lost the title. During this time, Deaner began appearing in Total Nonstop Action Wrestling (TNA), but he still continues to wrestle for GCW. On July 12, 2009, Deaner defeated "Tenacious" Scotty Turner to win the TWA Heavyweight Championship. After his release from TNA, Deaner dropped his old redneck gimmick and dubbed himself "The Everyman". On April 25, 2010, Deaner lost the TWA Heavyweight Championship to Robbie MacAllister at TWA Wrestlelusion II.

After his release from Impact Wrestling in 2009, Cody returned to his roots and began wrestling on the independent wrestling circuit again. He quickly developed a loyal fan following that has come to be known as the Deaner Dynasty.

Deaner returned to the Independent circuit on March 25, 2010, at a Twin Wrestling Entertainment Event, Deaner competed in a 3 Way Dance which was won by Kamala, also on March 25, 2010, Deaner & Crazzy Steve & Kamala defeated Jake O'Reilly & Primo Scordino & Robbie MacAllister in a six-man tag team match, on May 1, 2010, Deaner defeated Cezar in a match for Classic Championship Wrestling.

On November 21, 2013, Deaner defeated Ethan Page to win the Battle Arts Openweight Championship.

In January 2016, Cody Deaner held 4 different heavyweight championships in 4 different Canadian independent wrestling promotions. Cody Deaner is the Border City Wrestling Champion, Rock Solid Wrestling Champion, Crossfire Wrestling Champion, and Magnificent Championship Wrestling Champion.

On September 20, 2025, Deaner made his Innovative Hybrid Wrestling debut on night one of the September To Surrender 20th anniversary tour against "Big Bad" LG Logan Green. The following night September 21 he went one on one with "Horsepower" Hunter Sampson. September 22 on the final night of the three day tour Deaner would take on Kirk Aube'. Deaner would return to Innovative Hybrid Wrestling on November 28 to team up with Shane-O in a tag team match against Awol. On March 13, 2026, Innovative Hybrid Wrestling presented Redemption where "The Alberta Clipper" Matt Chevron challenged Deaner to a match in which Deaner was victorious. The next night at Chambers Of Secrets Deaner would capture the Innovative Hybrid Wrestling Heavyweight Championship from Chip Chambers.

=== World Wrestling Entertainment (2004) ===
His earliest WWE match to record was on November 22, 2004, under the ring name Cody Steele in a dark match, where he lost to Muhammad Hassan. Three days later, on November 25, he made a televised appearance on WWE's program, SmackDown! as a planted hometown hero against Kurt Angle, in a match for Angle's Olympic gold medal. Angle defeated Steele to retain his medal.

=== Total Nonstop Action Wrestling (2009) ===
Deaner was signed to a contract by TNA in 2009. On February 12 edition of Impact!, Impact Knockout ODB cut a promo about letting "one lucky guy spend the night" with her and at Destination X, she chose Deaner as her date. From that time on, Deaner began serving as ODB's manager. On April 16 edition of Impact!, Deaner wrestled his first Impact match, a mixed tag team match with ODB against Abyss and Daffney. Abyss and Daffney won the match. Two weeks later on Impact!, Abyss defeated Deaner in Deaner's first singles match in Impact Wrestling .

At Hard Justice, ODB and Deaner faced The Beautiful People (Angelina Love and Velvet Sky) in a tag team match where Love's Impact Knockout Championship was on the line. Deaner pinned Sky to make ODB the new champion, but afterwards began arguing with her over who the champion really was. On August 27 edition of Impact!, it was announced that at No Surrender, he would face ODB to determine the true Knockout Champion. On the September 10 edition of Impact! Deaner defeated Tara in an MMA rules match, after Awesome Kong hit Tara with the Implant Buster while Deaner was inadvertently distracting the referee. At No Surrender, Deaner became the first male to challenge for the knockouts title which was currently vacant facing ODB, ODB defeated Deaner to win the Knockout Championship. On November 5, he lost to Desmond Wolfe in just seconds. On December 20 at Final Resolution Deaner competed in what would turn out to be his last Impact Wrestling match, a twelve-man "Feast or Fired" match, in which he was unsuccessful in capturing any of the four briefcases. He was released from TNA Wrestling on December 29, 2009.

=== Global Force Wrestling (2016–2017) ===
Cody Deaner released a self-produced video on his YouTube channel and CodyDeaner.com website looking to get a shot with Global Force Wrestling. Within six days of a campaign widely supported by his fans, Jeff Jarrett and Global Force Wrestling responded by booking him for their first show in 2016 in Poughkeepsie, New York on January 22. It was announced that Global Force Wrestling merged with Impact Wrestling leaving Deaner's status unknown.

=== Return to Impact Wrestling/ TNA ===
==== The Deaners (2018–2020) ====
In 2018, Cody Deaner returned to an Impact Wrestling ring when he faced former Impact Wrestling Heavyweight Champion Eli Drake on the international One Night Only PPV event BCW /Impact March Breakdown in Windsor, Ontario, Canada.

He returned again to an Impact Wrestling ring when he teamed with Cousin Jake and formed the tag team The Deaners as they made their debut on the Twitch exclusive broadcast "Last Chancery."

In March 2019, Cody Deaner officially re-signed a contract with Impact Wrestling and formed a tag team with his Cousin Jake known as The Deaners. Vignettes began airing of The Deaners on their farm known as The Deaner Compound. The Deaners were successful in their in-ring debut and spent the majority of 2019 feuding with the team of The Desi Hit Squad. On May 26, 2020, The North defended with success the World Tag Team Championships in Canada against Cody Deaner and Wheels Deaner at the Deaner Compound.

==== Violent By Design/The Design (2020–2024) ====
On December 12, 2020, at Final Resolution, during a match between Eric Young and Rhyno, Cody turned heel and attacked his tag team partner Cousin Jake, thus ending the Deaners tag team and aligning himself with Young and Joe Doering. After numerous video packages hinting at a character change, Deaner debuted a newly shaved head, trimmed beard and all black attire on the January 5, 2021, edition of Impact!. In the same episode he and Joe Doering defeated Rhino and Cousin Jake. On Impact's website, it was revealed his ring name was shortened to simply Deaner. At Hard To Kill, Deaner, Doering, and Young began going under the name Violent By Design (VBD), as they defeated Tommy Dreamer, Rhino, and Cousin Jake.

On the June 3, 2021 episode of Impact!, VBD leader Eric Young invoked the Freebird Rule and Deaner was given a share of the Impact World Tag Team Championship - which had been recently won by VBD teammates Doering and Rhino - marking his first title in Impact Wrestling. VBD would lose the titles to The Good Brothers (Doc Gallows and Karl Anderson) in a four-way tag team match at Slammiversary, that also involved Rich Swann and Willie Mack, and Fallah Bahh and No Way.

In early 2022, VBD formed an alliance with the Good Brothers, teaming with them at Hard To Kill to take on Eddie Edwards, Rich Swann, Willie Mack, Heath and Rhino in a 10-man Hardcore War match in a losing effort. On March 5, at Sacrifice, Young and Doering defeated The Good Brothers to win the Impact World Tag Team Championship for the second time, again with Deaner being also recognized as champion under the Freebird Rule.

After losing the tag titles at Under Siege, Deaner and Doering focused more on helping Young try to win the Impact World Championship during the summer of 2022, but were unsuccessful.

Following Kon and Alan Angels being added to VBD, Deaner would defeat Young in a cinematic prison fight (where it was implied Deaner stabbed him with a shiv) on the December 1 episode of Impact, thus becoming the new leader of the group and renaming it The Design.

At Final Resolution on December 9, 2023, Deaner unsuccessfully challenged Tommy Dreamer for the Impact Digital Media Championship.

On February 1, 2024, Deaner officially dissolved The Design, stating that it was his attempt to resurrect VBD, but no matter what he did, he couldn't bring it back to life. He lost a match to PCO and was attacked by Kon right after.

==== The Home Town Man (2024–present) ====
Following the dissolution of The Design, Deaner reverted to his previous ring name, Cody Deaner, and turned face for the first time since 2020 when he debuted a gimmick where he interacted with the audience on what match should take place after every promo segment, with said match taking place based on the crowd reaction. On the May 23, 2025 at Under Siege, Deaner was defeated by The System's Eddie Edwards causing Deaner not to receive his new contract with TNA Wrestling.

On June 6 at Against All Odds, Deaner returned as The Home Town Man (a masked character who claims to be from the city where the show is taking place that night, including wearing gear from that city's sports teams) where he, The Hardys and Leon Slater defeated The System (Moose, JDC, Eddie Edwards and Brian Myers).

== Other media ==
In 2023, Gray started a podcast entitled Wrestling is Life is Wrestling with Cody Deaner where he interviews wrestlers and people involved in the wrestling business to learn various life lessons from their personal life stories and journey. He has interviewed guests such as professional wrestlers Josh Alexander, Crazzy Steve, Shawn Spears, multimedia producer David Sahadi, and more.

== Personal life ==
Gray is married and has four children.

== Championships and accomplishments ==
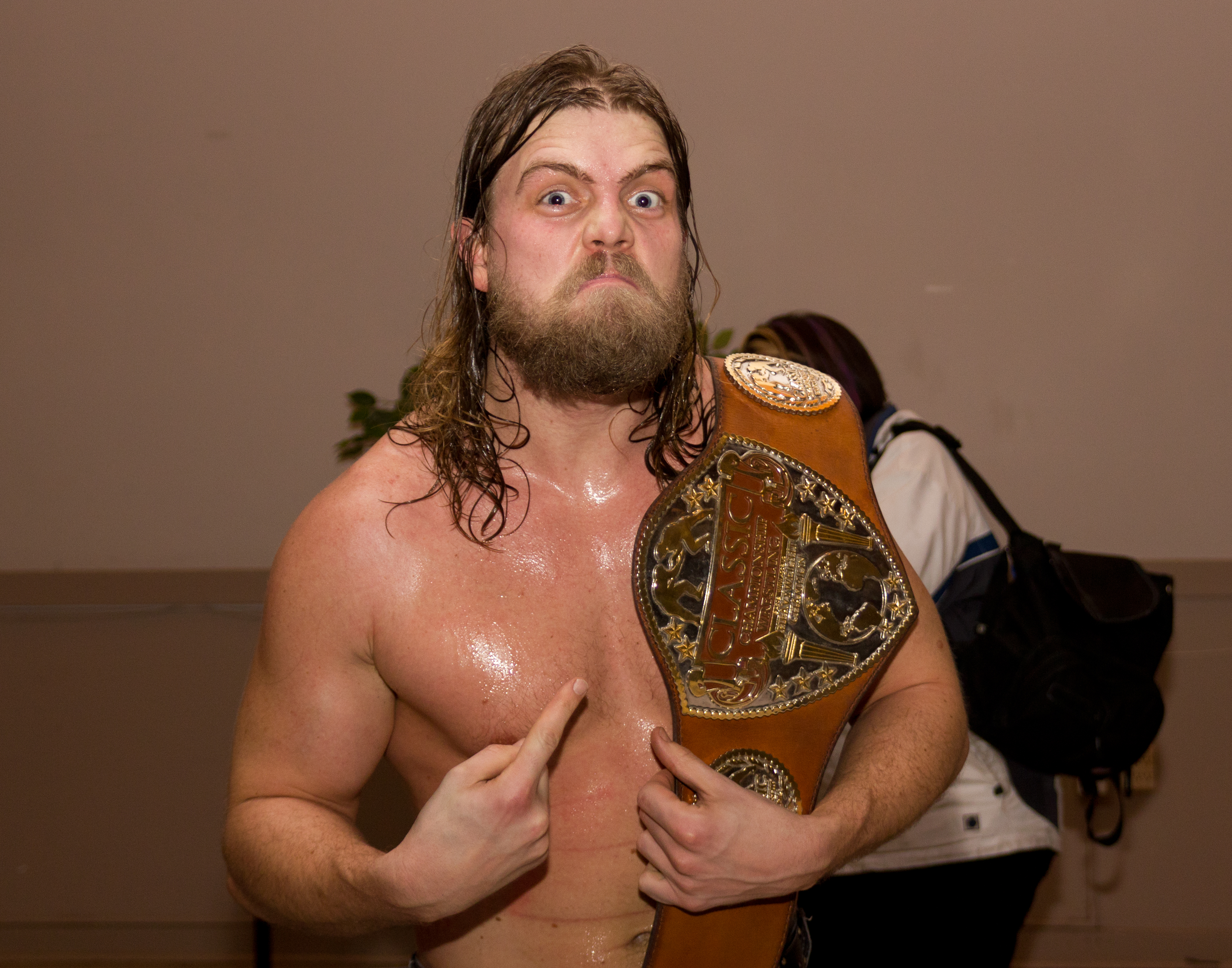
Deaner with the Classic Championship Wrestling Heavyweight championship belt

- Border City Wrestling
  - BCW Can-Am Heavyweight Championship (3 times)
  - Interim BCW Heavyweight (1 time)
- Canadian Pro-Wrestling Hall of Fame
  - Class of 2021
- Chem Valley Wrestling
  - CVW Championship (1 time)
- Classic Championship Wrestling
  - CCW Heavyweight Championship (1 time)
- Crossfire Wrestling
  - CW Heavyweight Championship (1 time)
  - CW Tag Team Championship (2 times) - with Cousin Jake (1) and Tyler Tira (1)
- Great Canadian Wrestling
  - GCW Ontario Independent Championship (2 times)
  - GCW Tag Team Championship (2 times) – with Hayden Avery
- Impact Wrestling
  - Impact World Tag Team Championship (2 times) – with Eric Young, Joe Doering and Rhino (1), Eric Young and Joe Doering (1)
- Innovative Hybrid Wrestling
  - IHW Heavyweight Championship (1 time, current)
- Magnificent Championship Wrestling
  - MCW Heavyweight Championship (1 time)
- Neo Spirit Pro Wrestling/ Neo Wrestling Federation/ NEO Pro Wrestling
  - NSPW Grand Championship/ NEO Grand Independent Championship (3 times)
- Pro Wrestling Illustrated
  - PWI ranked him #168 of the top 500 singles wrestlers in the PWI 500 in 2009
- Pro Wrestling Eclipse
  - PWE Heavyweight Championship (5 times, current)
- Pro Wrestling Xtreme
  - PWX Pro Division Championship (1 time)
  - PWX X Division Championship (1 time)
  - PWX Xtreme Championship (1 time)
- Pure Wrestling Association
  - PWA Tag Team Championship (1 time) – with Quinson Valentino
- Rock Solid Wrestling
  - RSW Canadian Heavyweight Championship (3 times)
- TWA Powerhouse
  - TWA Championship (1 time)
