= Savannah Evans =

American professional wrestler

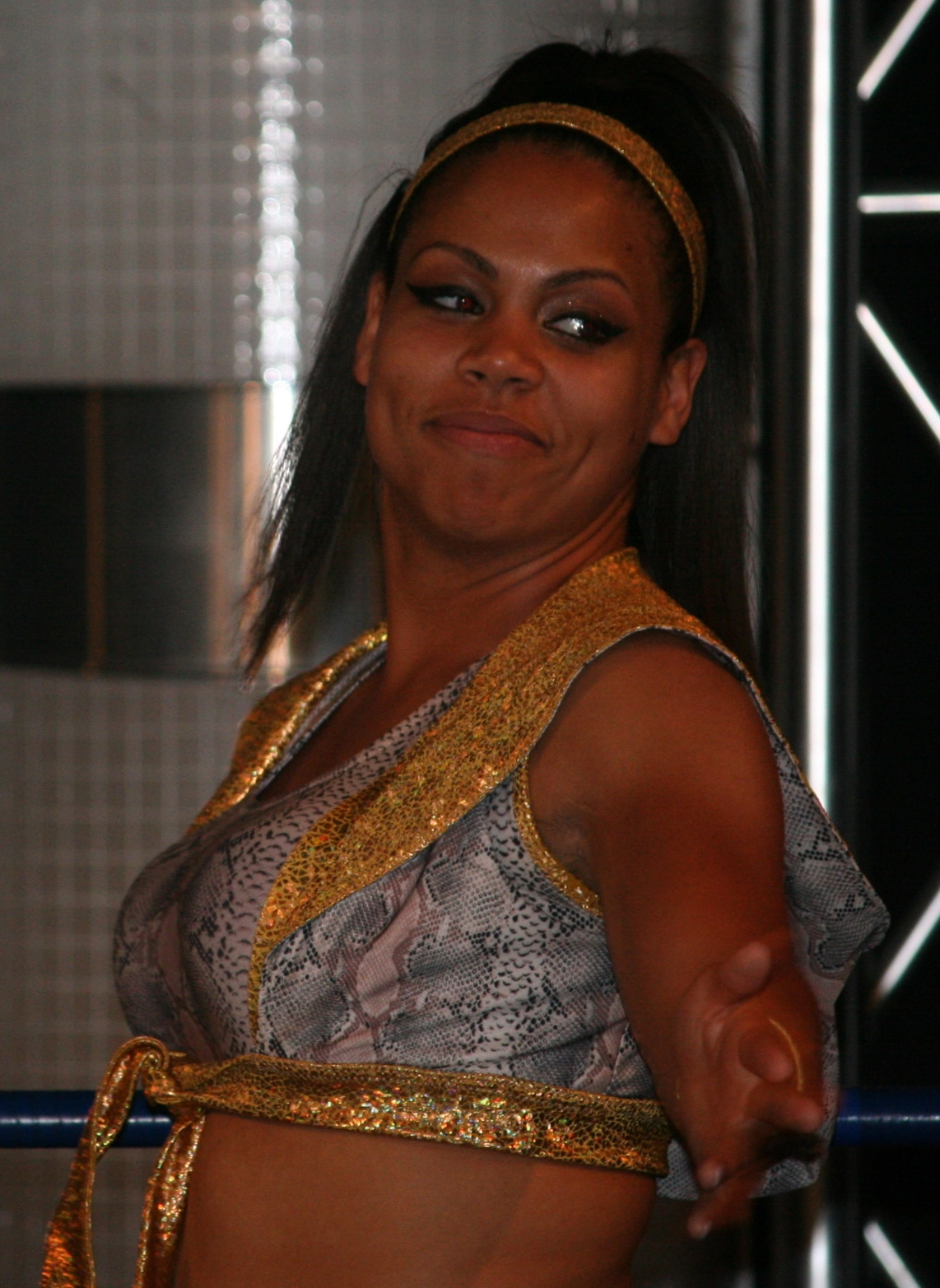
- Evans in May 2015

Personal information
- Born: Rachel Freeman; 9 April 1986 (age 40) Charlotte, North Carolina, U.S.

Professional wrestling career
- Ring name: Savannah Evans
- Billed height: 5 ft 9 in (1.75 m)
- Billed from: Charlotte, North Carolina
- Trained by: Caleb Konley; George South
- Debut: August 28, 2014

Rachel Freeman is an American professional wrestler best known for her time in Total Nonstop Action Wrestling (TNA) under the ring name Savannah Evans. Evans has also worked on the independent circuit on various promotions such as Evolve, Shimmer Women Athletes and Shine, as well as appearing on All Elite Wrestling (AEW).

== Professional wrestling career ==
=== Early career (2014–2021) ===
After training with Caleb Konley and George South, Evans made her professional wrestling debut on November 30, 2014, during the third show of Queens of Combat, an all-women's promotion, in a losing effort to Miss Diss Lexia. Since 2017, Evans adapted the nickname "The Cannibal". Evans made her first All Elite Wrestling (AEW) appearance on the October 27, 2020, episode of AEW Dark, where she teamed with KiLynn King as the two lost to the Women's Tag Team Cup winners, Diamante and Ivelisse.

=== Impact Wrestling / Total Nonstop Action Wrestling (2021–2025) ===
==== Teaming with Tasha Steelz (2021–2023) ====
On the August 8, 2021, of Impact!, after Fire 'N Flava (Kiera Hogan and Tasha Steelz) lost to Jordynne Grace and Rachael Ellering, Evans made her Impact Wrestling debut by attacking Hogan and aligning herself with Steelz, who have turned on Hogan, disbanding Fire 'N Flava in the process. On September 18, at Victory Road, which was taped on August 17, Evans and Steelz challenged Decay (Havok and Rosemary) for the Impact Knockouts Tag Team Championship, but were unsuccessful. On October 9, at Knockouts Knockdown, taped on September 17, Evans had her first victory on Impact by winning a Monster's Ball match in the memory of Daffney, which involved Alisha Edwards, Grace and Kimber Lee.

On April 1, 2022, at Multiverse of Matches participated four-way tag team match for the Knockouts World Tag Team Championship, but were unsuccessful. On April 7, Evans confirmed that she has signed a multi-year contract with Impact. On November 18, at Over Drive, Evans and Steelz received another opportunity for the Knockouts World Tag Team Championship against The Death Dollz (Jessicka and Taya Valkyrie), who were the champions at the time, but were unsuccessful.

==== The SHAWntourage (2023–2024) ====
Following Steelz's hiatus from Impact In January 2023, Evans found a new ally in Gisele Shaw, as she helped her to defeat Deonna Purrazzo on February 24, at No Surrender. On March 24, at Sacrifice, as Evans and Shaw attacked Purrazzo after Shaw lost in their match, Steelz returned as a face, attacking Evans and Shaw. At both Emergence in August 2023 and Victory Road in September 2023, Shaw and Evans challenged for the Impact Knockouts World Tag Team Championship, but lost to champions Masha Slamovich and Killer Kelly. In February 2024, The SHAWntourage would disband, follow Gisele Shaw's loss to Jordynne Grace at No Surrender.

==== Return to singles competition (2024–2025) ====
On the October 31, 2024 edition of Impact!, Evans would return and attack Léi Ying Lee. Evans would make her in-ring return on the November 21 edition of Impact!, where she defeated Brittany Jade.

At Turning Point, Evans would face Xia Brookside and Rosemary in a three-way match, which would be won by Rosemary. Evans would begin a feud with Xia Brookside, following their match at Turning Point. On the January 9, 2025 edition of Impact!, Brookside would bring out a returning Lei Ying Lee to challenge and defeat Evans to end their feud. Evans won a Knockouts Battle Royal on the February 6 edition of Impact!, earning a shot at Masha Slamovich's Knockouts World Championship, but she failed to win the following week. on the March 6 episode of Impact, Evans defeated Xia Brookside. on the March 20 episode of Impact, Evans and Rosemary lost to Léi Ying Lee and Xia Brookside. on the April 11 episode of TNA Xplosion, Evans lost to Maggie Lee in an upset. on the April 25 episode of TNA Xplosion, Evans lost to Jody Threat in her final match for the company.

On May 2, 2025, it was reported that Evans has departed TNA.

== Other media ==
In August 2023, during a virtual signing, Evans revealed that she has done stunt work for the second season of Heels.

== Championships and accomplishments ==
- Action Packed Wrestling
  - APW Carolinas Championship (1 time)
- Platinum Pro Wrestling
  - Diamonds Division Starlight Championship (1 time)
- Intense Wrestling Entertainment
  - IWE Mayhem Championship (1 time)
  - IWE Women's Championship (1 time)
- Fest Wrestling
  - Fest Wrestling Championship (1 time, current)
- Fire Star Pro Wrestling
  - FSPW Jewels of Wrestling Championship (1 time, current, inaugural)
  - FSPW Women's Championship (1 time, inaugural)
- Pro Wrestling Illustrated
  - Ranked No. 56 of the top 150 women's wrestlers in the PWI Women's 150 in 2022
- Old School Championship Wrestling
  - OSCW Women's Championship (1 time)
- Revolution Wrestling Authority
  - RWA Women's Championship (1 time, inaugural)
