= TNA Digital Media Championship =

Former professional wrestling championship

- The final TNA Digital Media Championship belt (2024–2025)

Details
- Promotion: Total Nonstop Action Wrestling (TNA)
- Date established: September 30, 2021
- Date retired: March 29, 2025

Other names
- Impact Digital Media Championship (2021–2024); TNA Digital Media Championship (2024–2025)
Statistics
- First champion: Jordynne Grace
- Final champion: Steph De Lander
- Longest reign: Joe Hendry (266 days)
- Shortest reign: Laredo Kid (29 days)
- Oldest champion: PCO (56 years, 203 days)
- Youngest champion: Jordynne Grace (25 years, 232 days)
- Heaviest champion: AJ Francis (330 lb (150 kg))
- Lightest champion: Jordynne Grace (150 lb (68 kg))

The TNA Digital Media Championship was a professional wrestling television championship created and promoted by Total Nonstop Action Wrestling (TNA). It was an intergender tertiary championship, openly available to both male and female wrestlers.

On March 29, 2025, during the TNA iMPACT! tapings, Director of Authority Santino Marella stripped final champion Steph De Lander of the title, retired it and replaced it with the TNA International Championship.

== History ==
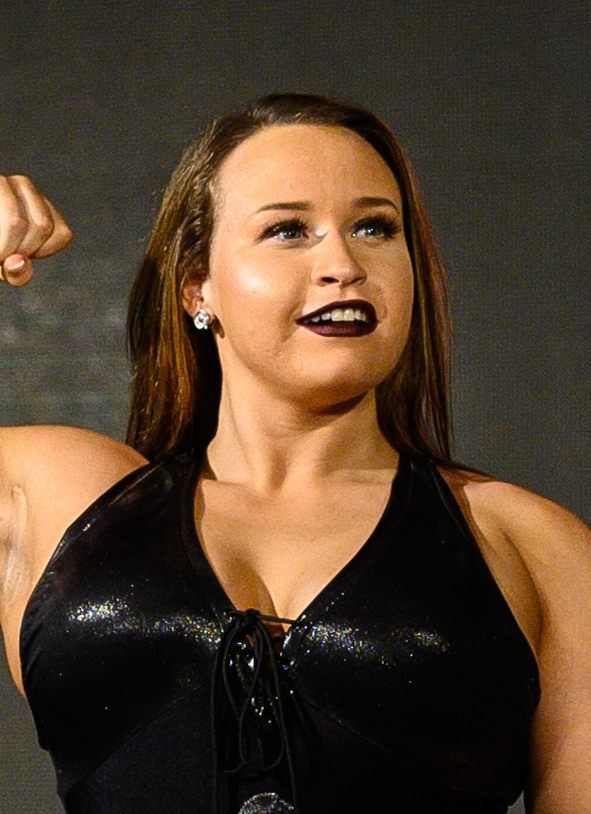
Inaugural champion Jordynne Grace.

On the September 30, 2021 episode of Impact!, the Impact Digital Media Championship was introduced and it was announced that an intergender tournament will be held with the inaugural champion being crowned in the final at Bound for Glory. The first round matches aired on Tuesdays and Wednesdays on Impact Plus and on YouTube for Impact Ultimate Insider members, before being distributed to the public across all social media platforms 24 hours later. On October 23, 2021, Jordynne Grace won the intergender six-way match tournament final to become the inaugural Impact Digital Media Championship holder by defeating Chelsea Green, Crazzy Steve, Fallah Bahh, John Skyler, and Madison Rayne at Bound for Glory.

In June 2024, TNA wrestler A. J. Francis won the Digital Media Championship from Laredo Kid. Days later, Francis bought the Canadian International Heavyweight Championship, a title that was promoted in Canada for many years and had been retired since 1987. As the new owner of the title, Francis declared himself as its new champion, making himself a double champion in the process. All Digital Media matches after this were for both title belts, until January 2025.

On January 19, 2025, at The People vs GCW, an event promoted by Game Changer Wrestling, TNA Digital Media Champion PCO appeared. During an unplanned segment, he attempted to destroy the Digital Media championship belt and announced his departure from TNA. Five days later, TNA wrestler Steph De Lander appeared with the title, claiming she had won the title in divorce proceedings from PCO and declared herself champion. During the March 29 tapings, Director of Authority Santino Marella stripped De Lander of the title, retired it and replaced it with the new TNA International Championship.

== Championship tournament(s) ==
=== Impact Digital Media Championship Tournament (2021) ===
First round

- John Skyler defeated Zicky Dice – October 5, 2021
- Crazzy Steve defeated Hernandez – October 6, 2021
- Fallah Bahh defeated Sam Beale – October 12, 2021
- Jordynne Grace defeated Johnny Swinger – October 13, 2021
- Chelsea Green defeated Madison Rayne – October 19, 2021
- Tenille Dashwood defeated Alisha Edwards – October 20, 2021

Final

- Jordynne Grace defeated Chelsea Green, Crazzy Steve, Fallah Bahh, John Skyler, and Madison Rayne* – October 23, 2021

*Madison Rayne replaced Tenille Dashwood, who was removed from match.

== Championship belt designs ==
The original design of the title (2021–2024).

The 2024 to 2025 design of the title.

The original design of the Impact Digital Media Championship featured a silver main plate with gold indentation and red gem stones on the sides, with four side plates.

The second designs is similar, but just with the TNA Logo in the middle since the company name reverted to Total Nonstop Action Wrestling (TNA) and more gold indented in the plates.

== Reigns ==
=== Names ===
Name	Years
Impact Digital Media Championship	September 30, 2021 – January 14, 2024
TNA Digital Media Championship	January 14, 2024 – March 29, 2025

Key
No.	Overall reign number
Reign	Reign number for the specific champion
Days	Number of days held
+	Current reign is changing daily

No.	Champion	Championship change			Reign statistics		Notes	Ref.
No.	Champion	Date	Event	Location	Reign	Days	Notes	Ref.
Impact Wrestling
1	Jordynne Grace	October 23, 2021	Bound for Glory; Pre-show	Sunrise Manor, NV	1	90	Defeated Chelsea Green, Crazzy Steve, Fallah Bahh, John Skyler, and Madison Rayne in a tournament final intergender six-way match to become the inaugural champion.	
2	Matt Cardona	January 21, 2022	Impact!	Pembroke Pines, FL	1	127	Aired on tape delay on February 3, 2022.	
3	Rich Swann	May 28, 2022	Wrestling Revolver's Vegas Vacation	Las Vegas, NV	1	34	This was an event promoted by The Wrestling Revolver.	
4	Brian Myers	July 1, 2022	Against All Odds; Pre-show	Atlanta, GA	1	113	This was a Dot Combat match.	
5	Joe Hendry	October 22, 2022	Impact!	Sunrise Manor, NV	1	266	Aired on tape delay on November 10, 2022.	
6	Kenny King	July 15, 2023	Slammiversary; Pre-show	Windsor, ON, Canada	1	55		
7	Tommy Dreamer	September 8, 2023	Victory Road	White Plains, NY	1	127	This was a Title vs. Career match. During this reign, Impact Wrestling's name was reverted to Total Nonstop Action Wrestling (TNA).	
Total Nonstop Action Wrestling (TNA)
8	Crazzy Steve	January 13, 2024	Hard To Kill	Paradise, NV	1	98	This was a No Disqualification match.	
9	Laredo Kid	April 20, 2024	Rebellion; Pre-show	Paradise, NV	1	29		
10	A. J. Francis	May 19, 2024	Impact! 20th Anniversary Show	Newport, KY	1	62	Aired on tape delay on June 6, 2024.	
11	PCO	July 20, 2024	Slammiversary	Montreal, QC, Canada	1	187	This was a Montreal Street Fight that was also for Francis' Canadian International Heavyweight Championship.	
12	Steph De Lander	January 23, 2025	Impact!	San Antonio, TX	1	65	PCO's contract with TNA expired in late 2024, and on January 19, 2025, he made an appearance at a Game Changer Wrestling (GCW) event in which he legitimately aired his grievances with TNA management, before attempting to destroy the championship belt with a sledgehammer. In storyline, De Lander was awarded the championship following a divorce settlement with PCO, who had been her storyline husband.	
—	Deactivated	March 29, 2025	Impact!	St. Joseph, MO	—	—	Director of Authority Santino Marella stripped Steph De Lander of the title and replaced it with the TNA International Championship. Aired on tape delay on April 3, 2025.	
