= Tom Hannifan =

American professional wrestling announcer

Personal information
- Born: Thomas Hannifan; May 19, 1989 (age 37) Philadelphia, Pennsylvania, U.S.
- Education: Pennsylvania State University

Professional wrestling career
- Ring name(s): Tom Hannifan; Tom Phillips
- Billed height: 6 ft 0 in (1.83 m)
- Billed from: Philadelphia, Pennsylvania
- Debut: 2012

Thomas Hannifan (born May 19, 1989) is an American professional wrestling commentator and sports broadcaster. He is signed to Total Nonstop Action Wrestling (TNA), alongside Matthew Rehwoldt. He was previously an announcer for WWE under the ring name Tom Phillips and served at various points as the play-by-play commentator on NXT, SmackDown, 205 Live, NXT UK and Raw. In 2022, Hannifan joined Impact Wrestling as their lead commentator.

== Career ==
=== Early broadcasting career ===
Hannifan began his career in his second year of high school as a public address announcer for a football game. He began studying at Penn State Altoona before transferring to Pennsylvania State University’s main campus where he pursued a major in broadcast journalism, with a specific focus on sports broadcasting, and graduated in the year 2011.

During his tenure at Penn State, Hannifan was an active member of CommRadio, a radio station run by the students. Post-graduation, he worked with the Student U branch of the Big Ten Network. He also provided play-by-play commentary for Juniata College's football and basketball teams in central Pennsylvania.

Approximately a year and a half after graduating from college, Hannifan received a job offer from WWE.

=== WWE (2012–2021) ===
Hannifan conducted backstage interviews for the WWE App on Raw and was the lead announcer on Superstars, Main Event and SmackDown, flanked by color commentators Jerry Lawler and Byron Saxton, until he was replaced by NXT's play-by-play commentator Rich Brennan on the August 27, 2015, episode of SmackDown. He also served as the Social Media Lounge host on all WWE pay-per-view pre-shows until Fastlane, when Charly Caruso took over the Social Media Lounge, and conducted backstage interviews for WWE.com.

In the summer of 2014 Phillips entered into a brief storyline with Alicia Fox, where he was stalked and tormented by her on a number of occasions, both ringside and backstage. Hannifan, as Tom Phillips, served as lead play-by-play announcer for SmackDown Live commentary team. He was the lead commentator for the NXT brand tapings and broadcasts from 2014 until being replaced by Mauro Ranallo in 2017. Phillips acted as lead play-by-play announcer at WrestleMania 33 on April 2, 2017, for the SmackDown brand, becoming the fifth person in the company's history to act as the lead commentator at WrestleMania. Philips also led commentating in 205 Live before Vic Joseph replaced him.

In 2017 a Twitter user named Melissa posted screenshots of explicit conversations she alleges happened between her and Phillips while they were engaged. After the news broke, Phillips set his social media accounts to private.

Phillips filled in for Michael Cole on the October 2, 2017, Raw so that Cole could attend the wedding of his son. On October 5, 2019, WWE announced that a new commentary team would be on NXT UK, including Phillips. On November 1, 2019, due to significant flight delays, Phillips filled in on commentary for Cole and Corey Graves on SmackDown with other substitute announcers Renee Young and Aiden English on first hour and Pat McAfee on second hour.

Phillips also acted as lead play-by-play announcer at the Royal Rumble on January 26, 2020, for the Raw brand; the next day, Phillips announced that he would return for his new play-by-play commentator role on Raw, replacing Vic Joseph and joining existing commentators Jerry Lawler and Byron Saxton. On March 12, 2020, Phillips left the announcing team on NXT UK. In April 2021, it was announced that Phillips would be replaced by Adnan Virk in his role as play-by-play commentator for Monday Night Raw.

On May 27, 2021, WWE announced they had released Phillips from his contract, ending his nearly nine-year tenure with the company. In January 2022, Phillips revealed his reaction to his WWE release, stating "It was a shock and it was a surprise. It was an emotional and heart-breaking day, but this is a business. It's budget cuts, and the pandemic has hit a lot of different businesses in a lot of different ways.... It took me a while to separate my personal feelings from what happened to a business standpoint."

=== Impact Wrestling / Total Nonstop Action Wrestling (2022–present) ===
On January 8, 2022, Renee Paquette reported that Hannifan had joined Impact Wrestling as the new play-by-play announcer, replacing Matt Striker. Hannifan made his debut with the promotion at Hard to Kill.

== Other media ==
Hannifan is currently the co-host of State of State: A Penn State Football Show, along with former Penn State and NFL cornerback Justin King.

Preceded by Michael Cole	SmackDown lead announcer 2014–2015	Succeeded by Michael Cole
Preceded by Michael Cole	SmackDown lead announcer 2015	Succeeded by Rich Brennan
Preceded by Rich Brennan	NXT lead announcer 2016–2017	Succeeded by Mauro Ranallo
Preceded by Mauro Ranallo	SmackDown lead announcer 2017–2019	Succeeded by Michael Cole
Preceded by Vic Joseph	NXT UK lead announcer 2019–2020	Succeeded by Andy Shepherd
Preceded by Vic Joseph	205 Live lead announcer 2019–2020	Succeeded by Jon Quasto
Preceded by Vic Joseph	Raw lead announcer 2020–2021	Succeeded by Adnan Virk
Preceded by Vic Joseph	205 Live lead announcer 2021	Succeeded by Vic Joseph
Preceded by Matt Striker	TNA Impact lead announcer 2022–present	Succeeded by current
