= Gia Miller =

American professional wrestler and manager

Personal information
- Born: Georgia Lee Ann Milton; March 17, 1998 (age 28) Tuscaloosa, Alabama, U.S.

Professional wrestling career
- Ring name(s): Mean Gia; Gia Miller; GLAM; Rusty Iron
- Billed from: Roadhouse, Texas
- Debut: 2019

Georgia Lee Ann Milton (born March 17, 1998), better known as Gia Miller, is an American professional wrestler, interviewer, and manager currently signed to Total Nonstop Action Wrestling (TNA).

== Career ==
Milton made her professional wrestling debut in 2019, wrestling on the independent circuit in the Southern United States.

She made her TNA (then known as Impact Wrestling!) debut in April 2020. She has been an on-screen interviewer on both weekly television shows, and pay-per-view events.

On July 20, 2025, during Slammiversary, during a storyline segment Miller was attacked by Tessa Blanchard, causing Blanchard to be suspended.
