= List of TNA X Division Champions =

List of professional wrestling championship winners

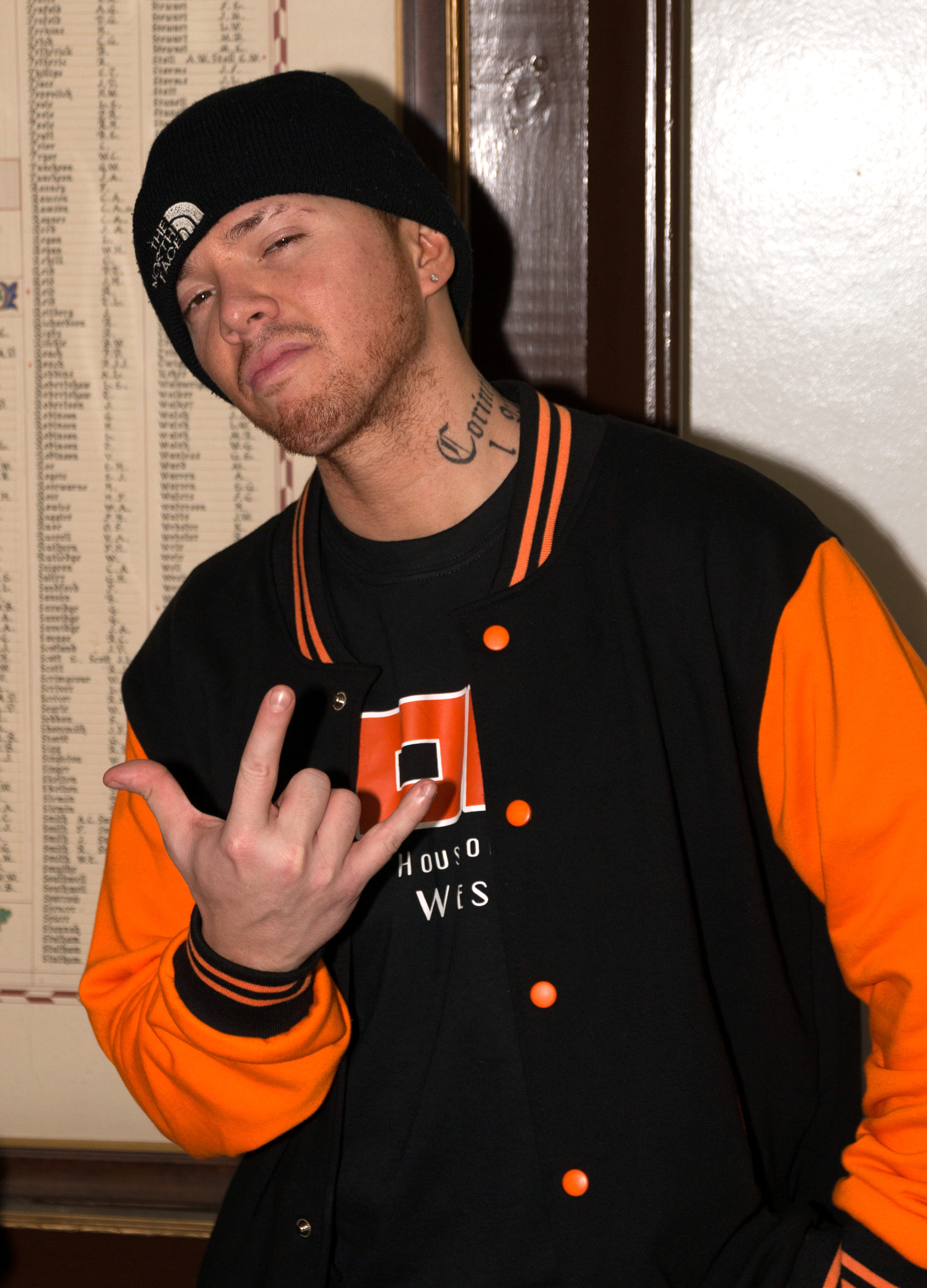
Current and four-time champion Amazing Red

The TNA X Division Championship is a professional wrestling championship owned by the Total Nonstop Action Wrestling (TNA) professional wrestling promotion. The title was created and debuted on June 19, 2002, at the taping of TNA's second weekly pay-per-view (PPV) event.

Title reigns are determined either by professional wrestling matches between wrestlers involved in pre-existing scripted feuds and storylines, or by scripted circumstances. Wrestlers are portrayed as either villains or heroes as they follow a series of tension-building events, which culminate in a wrestling match or series of matches for the championship. Title changes that happen on episodes of TNA's primary television program, TNA Impact!, air on television two to nine days from the date the match was taped. Changes that happened on weekly PPV events aired either during a live broadcast or aired on taped delay up to seven days apart. The inaugural champion was A.J. Styles, who defeated Low Ki, Jerry Lynn, and Psicosis in a Four Way Double Elimination match on June 19, 2002, at the taping of TNA's second weekly PPV event, which aired on June 26, 2002. Chris Sabin currently holds the record for the most reigns, with ten. At 298 days, Austin Aries' first reign and Leon Slater are tied for the longest reign in the title's history. At less than one day, Eric Young's only reign, Rockstar Spud's second reign, and Sabin's sixth reign are the shortest in the title's history. Overall, there have been 113 reigns shared among 55 wrestlers, with 14 vacancies.

Amazing Red is the current champion in his fourth reign. He won the vacant title by defeating BDE, Cedric Alexander, Fabian Aichner, KC Navarro, Rich Swann, and Ryan Nemeth in a seven-way scramble at Bound for Glory on October 11, 2026, in Tampa, Florida. The title was previously vacated by Leon Slater, who invoked Option C for a TNA World Championship match at Bound for Glory.

== Title history ==
=== Names ===
Name	Years
NWA X Championship	2002
NWA–TNA X Championship	2002
NWA–TNA X Division Championship	2003
TNA X Division Championship	2003 – March 1, 2017; January 13, 2024 – present
Impact Wrestling X Division Championship	March 2, 2017 – August 17, 2017
GFW X Division Championship	August 17, 2017 – September 18, 2017
Impact X Division Championship	September 18, 2017 – January 13, 2024

=== Reigns ===
Key
No.	Overall reign number
Reign	Reign number for the specific champion
Days	Number of days held
<1	Reign lasted less than a day
+	Current reign is changing daily

No.	Champion	Championship change			Reign statistics		Notes	Ref.
No.	Champion	Date	Event	Location	Reign	Days	Notes	Ref.
NWA: Nonstop Total Action (NWA-TNA)
1	A.J. Styles	June 19, 2002	Weekly pay-per-view event #2	Huntsville, AL	1	49	Defeated Low Ki, Jerry Lynn, and Psicosis in a four-way double elimination match to become the inaugural champion. Aired on tape delay on June 26.	
2	Low Ki	August 7, 2002	Weekly pay-per-view event #8	Nashville, TN	1	14	This 3-Way Dance also featured Jerry Lynn.	
3	Jerry Lynn	August 21, 2002	Weekly pay-per-view event #11	Nashville, TN	1	49	This three-way ladder match also featured A.J. Styles. Aired on tape delay on August 28.	
—	Vacated	October 9, 2002	Weekly pay-per-view event #16	Nashville, TN	—	—	Jerry Lynn vacated the title due to injury.	
4	Syxx-Pac	October 9, 2002	Weekly pay-per-view event #16	Nashville, TN	1	14	Defeated Kid Kash, Tony Mamaluke, The S.A.T., Ace Steel, and A.J. Styles in a ladder match to win the vacant title.	
5	A.J. Styles	October 23, 2002	Weekly pay-per-view event #18	Nashville, TN	2	14		
6	Jerry Lynn	November 6, 2002	Weekly pay-per-view event #20	Nashville, TN	2	35		
7	Sonny Siaki	December 11, 2002	Weekly pay-per-view event #25	Nashville, TN	1	63		
8	Kid Kash	February 12, 2003	Weekly pay-per-view event #32	Nashville, TN	1	77	In 2003, the title was renamed the "TNA X–Division Championship", officially giving the title to Total Nonstop Action Wrestling (TNA).	
9	Amazing Red	April 30, 2003	Weekly pay-per-view event #43	Nashville, TN	1	14		
10	Chris Sabin	May 14, 2003	Weekly pay-per-view event #45	Nashville, TN	1	98	This 3-Way Dance also featured Jerry Lynn. On May 25, Sabin unified the title with the WWA International Cruiserweight Championship by defeating previous champion Lynn, Frankie Kazarian, and Johnny Swinger.	
11	Michael Shane	August 20, 2003	Weekly pay-per-view event #59	Nashville, TN	1	140	This Ultimate X match also featured Frankie Kazarian.	
12	Chris Sabin	January 7, 2004	Weekly pay-per-view event #76	Nashville, TN	2	84	This Ultimate X match also featured Christopher Daniels and Low Ki.	
—	Vacated	March 31, 2004	Weekly pay-per-view event #88	Nashville, TN	—	—	Chris Sabin vacated the title due to injury.	
13	Kazarian	March 31, 2004	Weekly pay-per-view event #88	Nashville, TN	1	70	Defeated Amazing Red to win the vacant title.	
Total Nonstop Action Wrestling (TNA)
14	A.J. Styles	June 9, 2004	Weekly pay-per-view event #98	Nashville, TN	3	49		
15	Kazarian (2) and Michael Shane (2)	July 28, 2004	Weekly pay-per-view event #105	Nashville, TN	2	14	Kazarian and Shane were declared co-champions after they simultaneously retrieved the title in an Ultimate X match that also featured A.J. Styles.	
16	Petey Williams	August 11, 2004	Weekly pay-per-view event #107	Nashville, TN	1	158	Defeated Amazing Red in the Gauntlet for the Gold final.	
17	A.J. Styles	January 16, 2005	Final Resolution	Orlando, FL	4	56	This Ultimate X match also featured Chris Sabin.	
18	Christopher Daniels	March 13, 2005	Destination X	Orlando, FL	1	182	This Ultimate X Challenge match also featured Elix Skipper and Ron Killings.	
19	A.J. Styles	September 11, 2005	Unbreakable	Orlando, FL	5	91	This 3-Way Dance also featured Samoa Joe.	
20	Samoa Joe	December 11, 2005	Turning Point	Orlando, FL	1	91		
21	Christopher Daniels	March 12, 2006	Destination X	Orlando, FL	2	29	This Ultimate X match also featured A.J. Styles.	
22	Samoa Joe	April 10, 2006	Impact!	Orlando, FL	2	70	Aired on tape delay on April 13.	
23	Senshi	June 19, 2006	Impact!	Orlando, FL	2	125	This 3-Way Dance also featured Sonjay Dutt. Aired on tape delay on June 22. Senshi was formerly known as Low Ki.	
24	Chris Sabin	October 22, 2006	Bound for Glory	Plymouth Charter Township, MI	3	2		
25	A.J. Styles	October 24, 2006	Impact!	Orlando, FL	6	13	This was a fourth round match of the Fight for the Right Tournament. Aired on tape delay on November 2.	
26	Christopher Daniels	November 6, 2006	Impact!	Orlando, FL	3	69	This 3-Way Dance also featured Chris Sabin. Aired on tape delay on November 16.	
27	Chris Sabin	January 14, 2007	Final Resolution	Orlando, FL	4	154	This 3-Way Dance also featured Jerry Lynn.	
28	Jay Lethal	June 17, 2007	Slammiversary	Nashville, TN	1	2		
29	Samoa Joe	June 19, 2007	Impact!	Orlando, FL	3	54	Aired on tape delay on June 21.	
30	Kurt Angle	August 12, 2007	Hard Justice	Orlando, FL	1	28	This was also for Angle's TNA World Heavyweight, IGF's version of the IWGP Heavyweight Championship, and Samoa Joe's TNA World Tag Team Championship. Angle became the first person to simultaneously hold all active championships in TNA.	
31	Jay Lethal	September 9, 2007	No Surrender	Orlando, FL	2	134		
32	Johnny Devine	January 21, 2008	Impact!	Orlando, FL	1	20	Aired on tape delay on January 24.	
33	Jay Lethal	February 10, 2008	Against All Odds	Greenville, SC	3	65	This six-man tag team Street Fight pit Lethal and The Motor City Machine Guns (Alex Shelley and Chris Sabin) against Johnny Devine and Team 3D (Brother Ray and Brother Devon), in which the wrestler to get the fall would win the title.	
34	Petey Williams	April 15, 2008	Impact!	Orlando, FL	2	152	This was Williams' Feast or Fired title opportunity. Aired on tape delay on April 17.	
35	Sheik Abdul Bashir	September 14, 2008	No Surrender	Oshawa, ON	1	84	This 3-Way Dance also featured Consequences Creed.	
36	Eric Young	December 7, 2008	Final Resolution	Orlando, FL	1	<1		
—	Vacated	December 7, 2008	Final Resolution	Orlando, FL	—	—	Management Director Jim Cornette stripped Eric Young of the title after a controversial win.	
37	Alex Shelley	January 11, 2009	Genesis	Charlotte, NC	1	63	Defeated Chris Sabin in a tournament final to win the vacant title.	
38	Suicide (Christopher Daniels/Kazarian)	March 15, 2009	Destination X	Orlando, FL	1 (4, 3)	102	This Ultimate X match also featured Chris Sabin, Consequences Creed, and Jay Lethal. Christopher Daniels portrayed Suicide in this title win. Frankie Kazarian also played the character during this reign, but Impact does not count it towards his record.	
39	Homicide	June 25, 2009	Impact!	Orlando, FL	1	52	This was Homicide's Feast or Fired title opportunity. Aired on tape delay on July 16.	
40	Samoa Joe	August 16, 2009	Hard Justice	Orlando, FL	4	50		
41	Amazing Red	October 5, 2009	Impact!	Orlando, FL	2	106	Aired on tape delay on October 8.	
42	Douglas Williams	January 19, 2010	Impact!	Orlando, FL	1	89	This was Rob Terry's Feast or Fired title opportunity. Aired on tape delay on January 28.	
—	Vacated	April 18, 2010	Lockdown	St. Charles, MO	—	—	Unable to defend due to travel restrictions after the Icelandic volcanic eruptions, Douglas Williams was stripped of the title.	
43	Kazarian	April 18, 2010	Lockdown	St. Charles, MO	3^{(4)}	28	Defeated Homicide and Shannon Moore in a steel cage match to win the vacant title.	
44	Douglas Williams	May 16, 2010	Sacrifice	Orlando, FL	2	113		
45	Jay Lethal	September 6, 2010	Impact!	Orlando, FL	4	17	Aired on tape delay on September 16.	
46	Amazing Red	September 23, 2010	Live event	New York, NY	3	2		
47	Jay Lethal	September 25, 2010	Live event	Rahway, NJ	5	43		
48	Robbie E	November 7, 2010	Turning Point	Orlando, FL	1	30		
49	Jay Lethal	December 7, 2010	Impact!	Orlando, FL	6	33	Aired on tape delay on December 16.	
50	Kazarian	January 9, 2011	Genesis	Orlando, FL	4^{(5)}	127	On the May 3 tapings of Impact, TNA announced their rebrand as Impact Wrestling (aired on tape delay on May 12).	
Impact Wrestling
51	Abyss	May 16, 2011	Impact	Orlando, FL	1	55	Aired on tape delay on May 19.	
52	Brian Kendrick	July 10, 2011	Destination X	Orlando, FL	1	63		
53	Austin Aries	September 11, 2011	No Surrender	Orlando, FL	1	298		
—	Vacated	July 5, 2012	Impact!	Orlando, FL	—	—	Austin Aries vacated the title to invoke Option C and challenge for the TNA World Heavyweight Championship.	
54	Zema Ion	July 8, 2012	Destination X	Orlando, FL	1	98	This Ultimate X match also featured Kenny King, Mason Andrews, and Sonjay Dutt.	
55	Rob Van Dam	October 14, 2012	Bound for Glory	Phoenix, AZ	1	137		
56	Kenny King	February 28, 2013	Impact	Orlando, FL	1	94	King's X Division membership was also at stake.	
57	Chris Sabin	June 2, 2013	Slammiversary XI	Boston, MA	5	18	This Ultimate X match also featured Suicide.	
58	Austin Aries	June 20, 2013	Impact	Peoria, IL	2	9	Aries dressed as Suicide to take his place in a three-way match that also featured Kenny King. Aired on tape delay on June 27.	
59	Chris Sabin	June 29, 2013	Impact	Las Vegas, NV	6	<1	This three-way match also featured Manik. Aired on tape delay on July 4.	
—	Vacated	June 29, 2013	Impact	Las Vegas, NV	—	—	Chris Sabin vacated the title to invoke Option C and challenge for the TNA World Heavyweight Championship. Aired on tape delay on July 11.	
60	Manik (T. J. Perkins)	July 18, 2013	Impact	Louisville, KY	2^{(1)}	94	This Ultimate X match also featured Greg Marasciulo and Sonjay Dutt. This was the second reign for the Suicide/Manik character and the first reign for Perkins. Aired on tape delay on July 25.	
61	Chris Sabin	October 20, 2013	Bound for Glory	San Diego, CA	7	34	This Ultimate X match also featured Austin Aries, Jeff Hardy, and Samoa Joe.	
62	Austin Aries	November 23, 2013	Impact	Orlando, FL	3	12	Aired on tape delay on December 12.	
63	Chris Sabin	December 5, 2013	Impact	Orlando, FL	8	42	This episode aired on tape delay on January 2, 2014.	
64	Austin Aries	January 16, 2014	Impact: Genesis	Huntsville, AL	4	45	Aired on tape delay on January 23.	
65	Sanada	March 2, 2014	Kaisen: Outbreak	Tokyo, Japan	1	110		
66	Austin Aries	June 20, 2014	Impact	Bethlehem, PA	5	5	Aired on tape delay on July 10.	
—	Vacated	June 25, 2014	Impact	New York, NY	—	—	Austin Aries vacated the title to invoke Option C and challenge for the TNA World Heavyweight Championship. Aired on tape delay on July 24.	
67	Samoa Joe	June 26, 2014	Impact	New York, NY	5	85	Defeated Low Ki and Sanada in a three-way match to win the vacant title. Aired on tape delay on August 7.	
—	Vacated	September 19, 2014	Impact	Bethlehem, PA	—	—	Unfit to compete, Samoa Joe vacated the title. Aired on tape delay on November 12.	
68	Low Ki	September 19, 2014	Impact	Bethlehem, PA	3	110	Defeated DJ Z, Tigre Uno, and Manik in a four-way match to win the vacant title. Aired on tape delay on November 19.	
69	Austin Aries	January 7, 2015	Impact	New York, NY	6	1		
70	Low Ki	January 8, 2015	Impact	New York, NY	4	23	Aired on tape delay on January 16.	
71	Rockstar Spud	January 31, 2015	Impact	London, England	1	43	This was Spud's Feast or Fired title opportunity. Aired on tape delay on March 20.	
72	Kenny King	March 15, 2015	Impact: Hardcore Justice	Orlando, FL	2	56	This four-way ladder match also featured Tigre Uno and Mandrews. Aired on tape delay on May 1.	
73	Rockstar Spud	May 10, 2015	Impact	Orlando, FL	2	<1	This gauntlet match also featured Argos, Crazzy Steve, Mandrews, Suicide/Manik, Tigre Uno, and Zema Ion. Aired on tape delay on May 29.	
—	Vacated	May 10, 2015	Impact	Orlando, FL	—	—	Rockstar Spud vacated the title to invoke Option C and challenge for the TNA World Heavyweight Championship. Aired on tape delay on June 10.	
74	Tigre Uno	June 24, 2015	Impact	Orlando, FL	1	199	Defeated Grado and Low Ki in a three-way elimination match to win the vacant title.	
75	Trevor Lee	January 9, 2016	Impact	Bethlehem, PA	1	155	Aired on tape delay on February 2.	
76	Eddie Edwards	June 12, 2016	Slammiversary	Orlando, FL	1	2	This four-way match also featured Andrew Everett and DJ Z.	
77	Mike Bennett	June 14, 2016	Impact	Orlando, FL	1	1	Aired on tape delay on June 21.	
78	Eddie Edwards	June 15, 2016	Impact	Orlando, FL	2	28	This Ultimate X match also featured Andrew Everett, Braxton Sutter, DJ Z, Mandrews, Rockstar Spud, and Trevor Lee. Aired on tape delay on July 5.	
79	Lashley	July 13, 2016	Impact	Orlando, FL	1	30	This Winner Takes All Six Sides of Steel was also for Lashley's TNA World Heavyweight Championship. Aired on tape delay on July 21.	
—	Vacated	August 12, 2016	Impact	Orlando, FL	—	—	Lashley vacated the title and unified the TNA King of the Mountain Championship with his TNA World Heavyweight Championship. Aired on tape delay on August 18.	
80	DJZ	August 13, 2016	Impact	Orlando, FL	2	148	This Ultimate X gauntlet match also featured Andrew Everett, Braxton Sutter, Mandrews, Rockstar Spud, and Trevor Lee. Aired on tape delay on September 1. DJZ was originally known as Zema Ion.	
81	Trevor Lee	January 8, 2017	Impact	Orlando, FL	2	102	This was a ladder match and Lee's Race for the Case title opportunity on Open Fight Night. Aired on tape delay on February 2. On March 2, the title was renamed the "Impact Wrestling X Division Championship" following the promotion's rebrand.	
82	Low-Ki	April 20, 2017	Impact!	Orlando, FL	5	40	This six-pack challenge also featured Andrew Everett, Dezmond Xavier, Sonjay Dutt, and Suicide.	
83	Sonjay Dutt	May 30, 2017	Impact!	Mumbai, India	1	81	Aired on tape delay on June 15. The title was later renamed the "GFW X Division Championship".	
Global Force Wrestling (GFW)
84	Trevor Lee	August 19, 2017	Impact!	Orlando, FL	3	82	This was a falls count anywhere match. Aired on tape delay on September 14. The title was later renamed the "Impact X Division Championship".	
Impact Wrestling
85	Taiji Ishimori	November 9, 2017	Impact!	Ottawa, Ontario, Canada	1	64	Aired on tape delay on January 4.	
86	Matt Sydal	January 12, 2018	Impact! Crossroads	Orlando, FL	1	191	Sydal's Impact Grand Championship was also at stake. Aired on tape delay on March 8.	
87	Brian Cage	July 22, 2018	Slammiversary XVI	Toronto, Ontario, Canada	1	112		
—	Vacated	November 11, 2018	Impact!	Las Vegas, NV	—	—	Brian Cage vacated the title to invoke Option C and challenge for the Impact World Championship. Aired on tape delay on November 15.	
88	Rich Swann	January 6, 2019	Homecoming	Nashville, TN	1	194	Defeated Ethan Page, Jake Crist, and Trey Miguel in an Ultimate X match to win the vacant title.	
89	Jake Crist	July 19, 2019	Impact!	Windsor, Ontario, Canada	1	93	Aired on tape delay on July 26.	
90	Ace Austin	October 20, 2019	Bound for Glory	Villa Park, IL	1	171–173	This Intergender ladder match also featured Acey Romero, Daga, and Tessa Blanchard. His reign ended during the TV tapings between April 8 and 10.	
91	Willie Mack	Between April 8 and April 10, 2020	Rebellion	Nashville, TN	1	Between 99 and 101	This was held during the TV tapings between April 8 and 10 and aired on tape delay on April 21.	
92	Chris Bey	July 18, 2020	Slammiversary	Nashville, TN	1	27		
93	Rohit Raju	August 14, 2020	Emergence; Night 1	Nashville, TN	1	120	This triple threat match also featured TJP. Aired on tape delay on August 18.	
94	Manik/TJP	December 12, 2020	Final Resolution	Nashville, TN	2	91	Manik later unmasked and worked as TJP.	
95	Ace Austin	March 13, 2021	Sacrifice	Nashville, TN	2	43		
96	Josh Alexander	April 25, 2021	Rebellion	Nashville, TN	1	151	This triple threat match also featured TJP.	
—	Vacated	September 23, 2021	Impact!	Nashville, TN	—	—	Josh Alexander vacated the title to invoke Option C and challenge for the Impact World Championship.	
97	Trey Miguel	October 23, 2021	Bound for Glory	Sunrise Manor, NV	1	182	Defeated Steve Maclin and El Phantasmo in a three-way tournament final to win the vacant title.	
98	Ace Austin	April 23, 2022	Rebellion	Poughkeepsie, NY	3	57	This three-way match also featured Mike Bailey.	
99	Mike Bailey	June 19, 2022	Slammiversary	Nashville, TN	1	110	This Ultimate X match also featured Kenny King, Trey Miguel, Andrew Everett, and Alex Zayne.	
100	Frankie Kazarian	October 7, 2022	Bound for Glory	Albany, NY	5^{(6)}	1		
—	Vacated	October 8, 2022	Impact!	Albany, NY	—	—	Frankie Kazarian vacated the title to invoke Option C and challenge for the Impact World Championship. Aired on tape delay on October 20.	
101	Trey Miguel	November 18, 2022	Over Drive	Louisville, KY	2	203	Defeated Black Taurus in a tournament final to win the vacant title.	
102	Chris Sabin	June 9, 2023	Against All Odds	Columbus, OH	9	36		
103	Lio Rush	July 15, 2023	Slammiversary	Windsor, Ontario, Canada	1	56		
104	Chris Sabin	September 9, 2023	Impact 1000	White Plains, NY	10	167	Aired on tape delay on September 14. The company later reverted to Total Nonstop Action Wrestling.	
Total Nonstop Action Wrestling (TNA)
105	Mustafa Ali	February 23, 2024	No Surrender	Westwego, LA	1	148		
106	Mike Bailey	July 20, 2024	Slammiversary	Montreal, Quebec, Canada	2	41		
107	Zachary Wentz	August 30, 2024	Emergence	Louisville, KY	1	14	This Ultimate X match also featured Hammerstone, Jason Hotch, Laredo Kid, and Riley Osborne.	
108	Mike Bailey	September 13, 2024	Victory Road	San Antonio, TX	3	44		
109	Moose	October 27, 2024	Impact!	Detroit, MI	1	266	Aired on tape delay on November 7.	
110	Leon Slater	July 20, 2025	Slammiversary	Elmont, NY	1	298		
111	Cedric Alexander	May 14, 2026	Thursday Night Impact!	Sacramento, CA	1	101	This was a 2-out-of-3 Falls match with Alexander winning 2–1.	
112	Leon Slater	August 23, 2026	Lockdown	Chicago, IL	2	<1	This was a Last Man Standing Steel Cage match, where had Slater lost, his first reign would have been unrecognized.	
—	Vacated	August 23, 2026	Lockdown	Chicago, IL	—	—	Previous champion Leon Slater invoked Option C for a TNA World Championship match at Bound for Glory.	
113	Amazing Red	October 11, 2026	Bound for Glory	Tampa, FL	4	32+	Defeated BDE, Cedric Alexander, Fabian Aichner, KC Navarro, Rich Swann, and Ryan Nemeth in a seven-way scramble to win the vacant title.	

== Combined reigns ==
As of November 12, 2026.

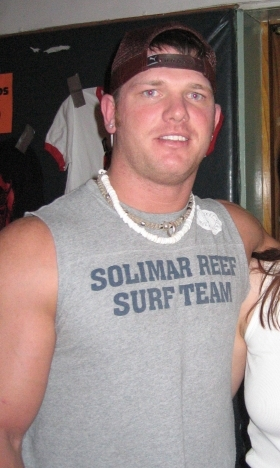
Inaugural and six-time champion A.J. Styles

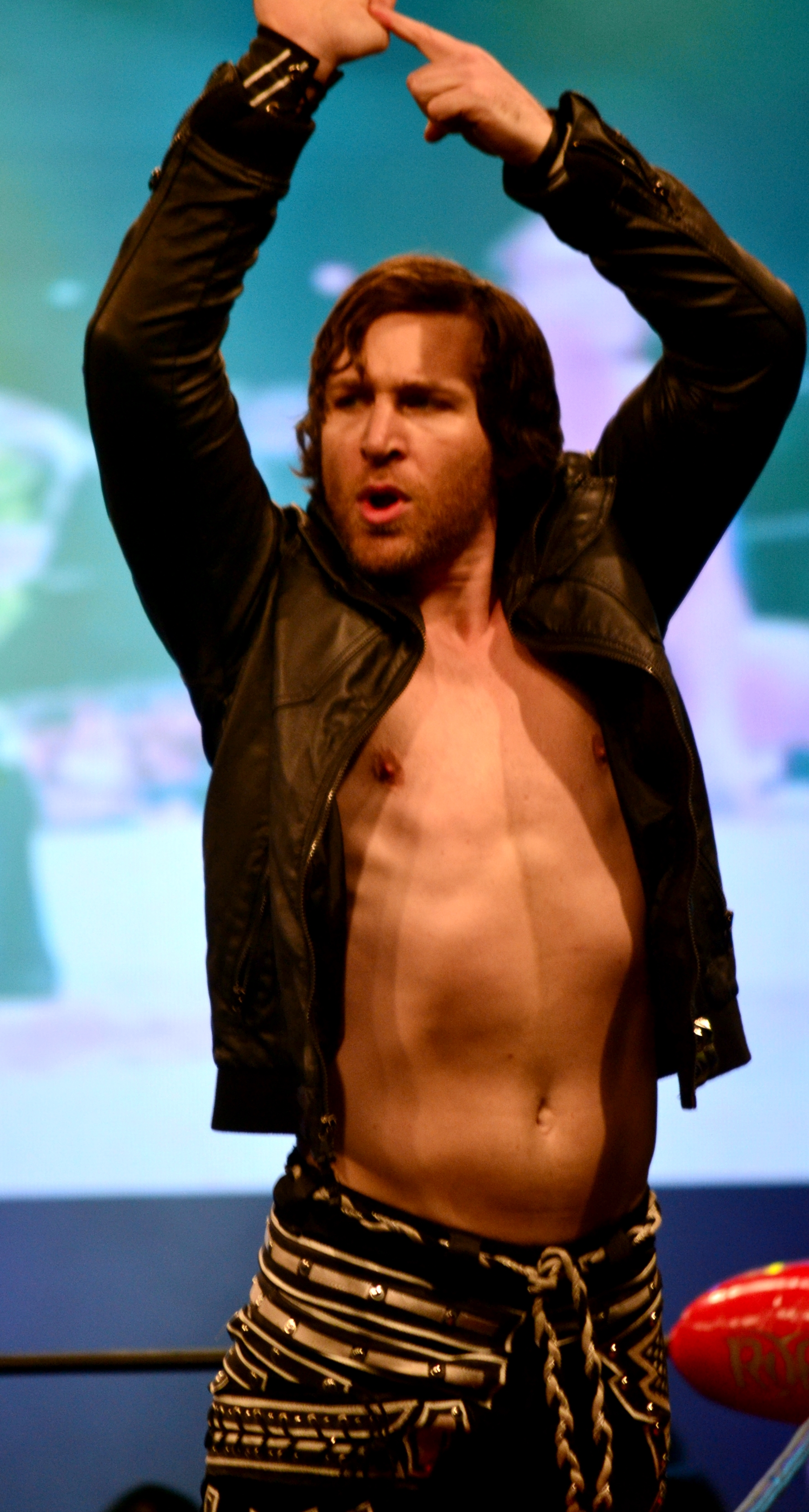
Record 10-time and longest combined-reigning champion Chris Sabin

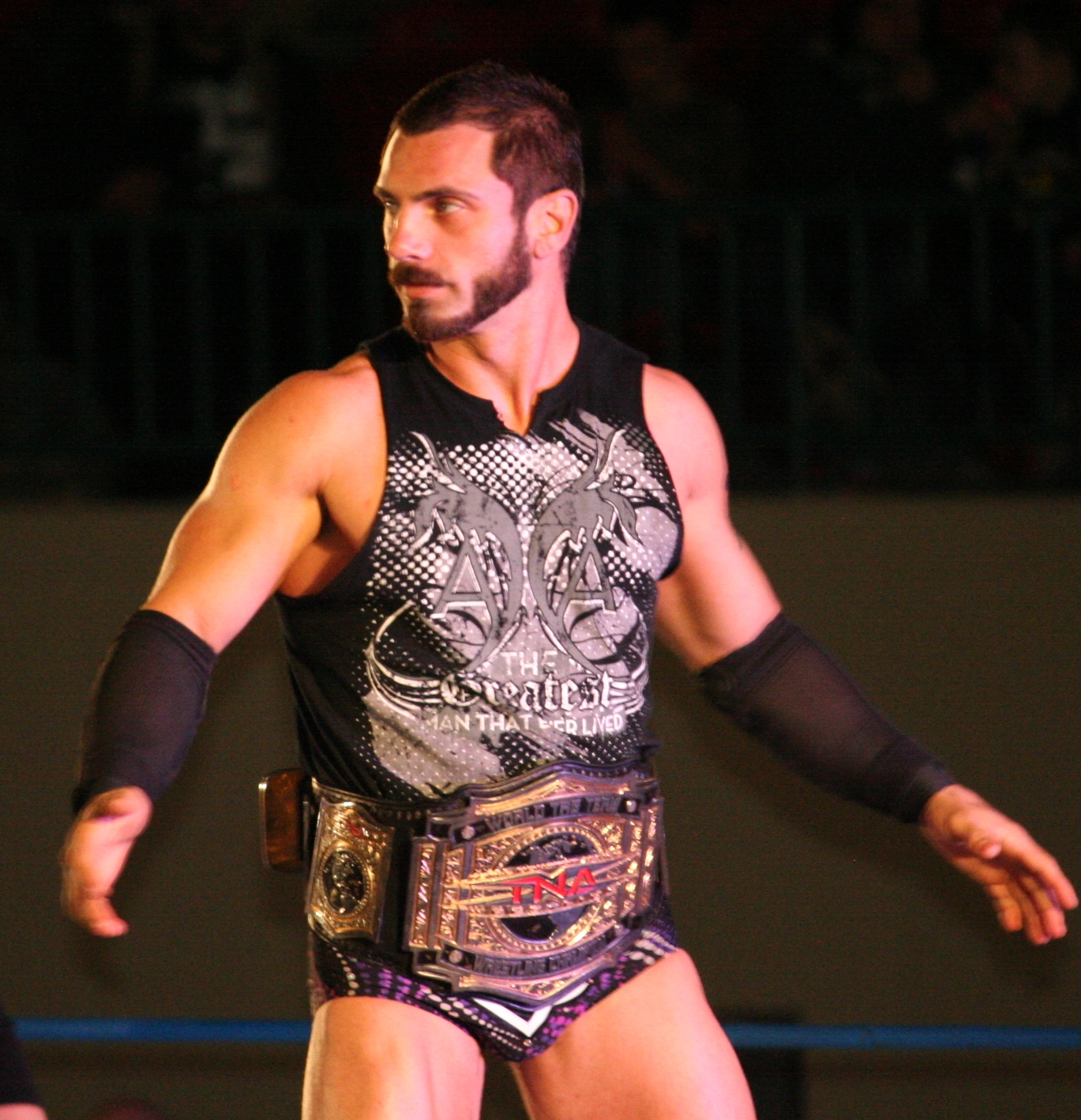
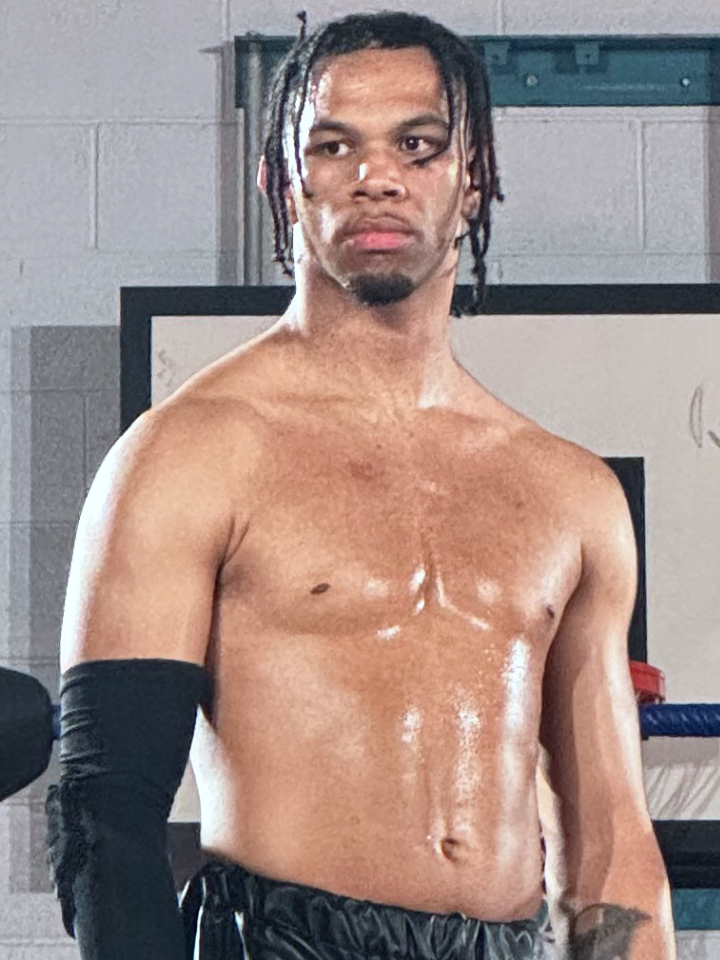
Austin Aries and Leon Slater both have the longest reign at 298 days.

†	Indicates the current champion
¤	The exact length of at least one title reign is uncertain, so the shortest length is considered.

Rank	Wrestler	No. of reigns	Combined days
1	Chris Sabin	10	635
2	Trey Miguel	2	385
3	Austin Aries	6	373
4	Samoa Joe	5	350
5	Trevor Lee	3	339
6	Low Ki/Senshi	5	312
7	Petey Williams	2	310
8	Leon Slater	2	298
9	Jay Lethal	6	294
10	Christopher Daniels	3	280
11	A.J. Styles	6	272
12	Ace Austin	3	¤271
13	Moose	1	266
14	DJZ/Zema Ion	2	246
15	Frankie Kazarian/Kazarian	5	240
16	Doug Williams	2	202
17	Tigre Uno	1	199
18	Mike Bailey	3	196
18	Suicide	2	196
20	Rich Swann	1	194
21	Matt Sydal	1	191
22	Manik/TJP	2	185
23	Amazing Red †	4	154+
24	Michael Shane	2	154
25	Josh Alexander	1	151
26	Kenny King	2	150
27	Mustafa Ali	1	148
28	Rob Van Dam	1	137
29	Rohit Raju	1	120
30	Brian Cage	1	112
31	Sanada	1	110
32	Cedric Alexander	1	101
33	Willie Mack	1	¤99
34	Jake Crist	1	93
35	Jerry Lynn	2	84
35	Sheik Abdul Bashir	1	84
37	Sonjay Dutt	1	81
38	Kid Kash	1	77
39	Taiji Ishimori	1	64
40	Alex Shelley	1	63
40	Brian Kendrick	1	63
40	Sonny Siaki	1	63
43	Lio Rush	1	56
44	Abyss	1	55
45	Homicide	1	52
46	Rockstar Spud	2	43
47	Eddie Edwards	2	30
47	Lashley	1	30
47	Robbie E	1	30
50	Kurt Angle	1	28
51	Chris Bey	1	27
52	Johnny Devine	1	20
53	Syxx-Pac	1	14
53	Zachary Wentz	1	14
55	Mike Bennett	1	1
56	Eric Young	1	<1

== Footnotes ==
- 1: – Low Ki used the ring name Senshi in 2006 after his return to TNA.
