= BDE (wrestler) =

American professional wrestler and YouTuber (born 1999)

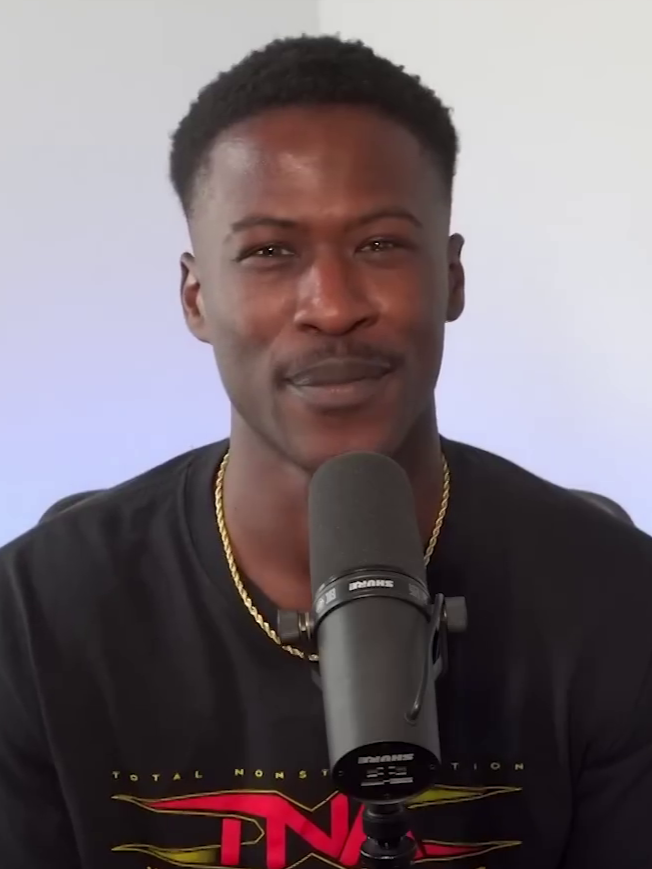
- BDE in 2026

Personal information
- Born: Brandon Jared Collymore; August 5, 1999 (age 27) Jersey City, New Jersey, U.S.

Professional wrestling career
- Ring name: BDE
- Billed from: Dayton, Ohio; Atlanta, Georgia
- Trained by: Ace Austin; Sami Callihan
- Debut: January 9, 2025

YouTube information
- Channel: BDE
- Years active: 2014–present
- Genres: Professional wrestling; Let's Play; commentary; vlogs
- Subscribers: 1.52 million
- Views: 805 million
- Last updated: November 3, 2026

Brandon Jared Collymore (born August 5, 1999), better known by his YouTube name BDE (short for Brandon Does Everything), is an American professional wrestler, YouTuber, and online streamer. He is signed to Total Nonstop Action Wrestling (TNA). He also appears on the independent circuit, specifically in The Wrestling Revolver, where he is a former two-time Revolver Remix Champion.

== Early life ==
Brandon Jared Collymore was born on August 5, 1999, in Jersey City, New Jersey. He was raised in Atlanta, Georgia. He attended North Springs High School where he studied acting and stage production. He served as the school's mascot, which inspired his "The Spartan" nickname. During his youth, he participated in basketball and American football in school before focusing on performing arts and digital content. Although he briefly attended college, he chose to withdraw to pursue a full-time career as a YouTuber.

== Internet career ==
Collymore began creating digital content at age 14 when he created his YouTube channel, now known as BDE. His first video was a Let's Play (LP) video of Happy Wheels. He mainly focused on making LP videos of Minecraft for two years before transitioning to making LP videos of the WWE 2K games and professional wrestling content. His YouTube channel surpassed one million subscribers on August 8, 2023.

== Professional wrestling career ==
BDE began training for professional wrestling in 2019 under Ace Austin and Sami Callihan, but he took a break in 2020 due to the COVID-19 pandemic. He resumed training in 2024.

=== The Wrestling Revolver (2025–present) ===
On October 19, 2024, at The Wrestling Revolver's "Bad Trip" event, BDE and the other members of the YouTube group VYBE confronted A. J. Francis; BDE later countered a chokeslam attempt from Francis with a cutter. At "Holiday Special" on December 21, a second confrontation occurred where Francis successfully executed a chokeslam on BDE and challenged him to a match.

BDE made his professional wrestling debut on January 9, 2025, at "Vybe Check", where he lost to Francis in a no disqualification match. At the January 31 event "Square Game", he competed in a six-man tag team match where he, VYBE member Brent Oakley, and KC Jacobs were defeated by Francis, Rich Swann, and KC Navarro. At "Goated" on March 22, BDE participated in a six-man #1 contender's match for the Revolver Remix Championship, which was won by Francis. BDE was scheduled to challenge Myron Reed for the Revolver World Championship at "We Did That" on April 5; however, the match was postponed after BDE announced at the event that he sustained an ankle injury during training, and Reed would attack his ankle until he was stopped by Swann. BDE eventually received his title opportunity in a Street Fight at "Let Us Cook" on May 1, but he was unsuccessful in dethroning Reed.

At "Cage of Horrors" on June 14, BDE secured his first career victory by winning a seven-man Golden Ticket Scramble, earning the Golden Ticket and a future title opportunity of his choosing. He later entered the Jerry Lynn Invitational on August 9, where he was eliminated in the first round during a four-way match that was won by Swann. On October 3, at "Tales from the Ring 8", BDE successfully cashed in his Golden Ticket to defeat Francis for the Revolver Remix Championship, winning the first title of his career. Following the match, fellow YouTuber-turned-wrestler Chris Danger appeared in the ring, seemingly to celebrate with BDE, before attacking him. BDE's reign concluded on November 21 at "WrestleKombat", where he lost the title to Danger. On November 23, at "Art of Battle", BDE defeated Matty Z to win the Battle Arts Canada Championship. At "Kross Hour" on February 5, 2026, BDE reclaimed the Revolver Remix Championship from Danger in a Danger, Ladders, and Chairs match. After the match, BDE was attacked by Joe Alonzo, prompting Alpha Sigma Sigma (Brent Oakley, KC Jacobs, and Dick Meyers) to try to save BDE. However, Oakley turned on BDE, Jacobs, and Meyers by attacking them with a steel chair. Crash Jaxon then joined Oakley and Alonzo in attacking BDE. The Algorithm – the stable consisting of Oakley, Alonzo, and Jaxon – faced BDE, Jacobs, and Meyers at Revolver Strong on April 25, where Oakley pinned BDE to win the match. At No Country For Ole Mancer on June 12, BDE lost the Revolver Remix Championship to Oakley in a Dayton Street Fight.

=== Total Nonstop Action Wrestling (2025–present) ===
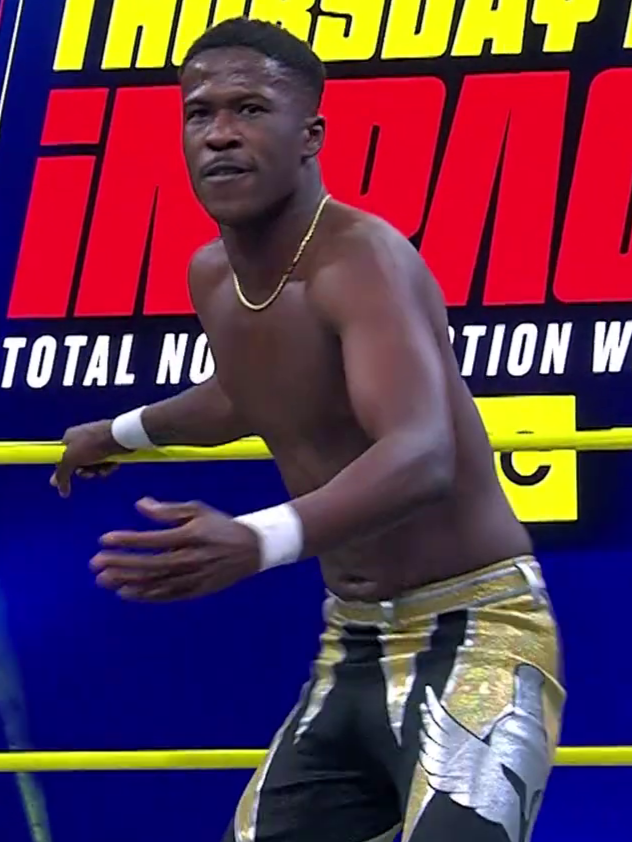
BDE in an episode of Impact! in January 2026

On October 10, 2025, Total Nonstop Action Wrestling (TNA) announced that BDE would make his promotional debut in the Call Your Shot Gauntlet at Bound for Glory on October 12. Entering the match at number nine, he helped The Rascalz eliminate A. J. Francis before being eliminated by Eric Young. BDE competed in his first singles match for the promotion at Turning Point on November 14, where he was defeated by Francis. At Final Resolution on December 5, BDE interfered in a TNA X Division Championship match between Francis and Rich Swann. He prevented Francis from using a steel chair, but was subsequently pulled into the ring and struck with a chokeslam by Francis.

On January 6, 2026, TNA officially announced that BDE had signed a contract with the promotion. On January 17 at Countdown to Genesis, BDE challenged Channing "Stacks" Lorenzo for the TNA International Championship in a four-way match that also involved Young and KJ Orso; Lorenzo won the match to retain the title. On the February 19 episode of Impact!, BDE began teaming with Swann. BDE achieved his first singles victory in TNA on the October 1 episode of Impact!, defeating Mr. Elegance to qualify for the six-way scramble for the TNA X Division Championship at Bound for Glory.

== Personal life ==
Collymore is an avid fan of comic books and superhero cinema, specifically citing Spider-Man and The Flash as his favorite characters. His interests in gaming include the Call of Duty, Fortnite, Minecraft, and WWE 2K franchises, as well as The Walking Dead by Telltale Games. Additionally, he has practiced music mixing since childhood and began performing as a disc jockey in his personal time after acquiring professional equipment.

== Championships and accomplishments ==
- Battle Arts Pro Wrestling
  - Battle Arts Canada Championship (1 time, current)
- The Wrestling Revolver
  - Revolver Remix Championship (2 times)
  - Golden Ticket (1 time)
  - Year-End Awards (2 times)
    - Match of the Year (2025) — BDE vs. Chris Danger
    - Moment of the Year (2025) – Chris Danger turns on BDE
