= Jake Crist =

American professional wrestler (born 1984)

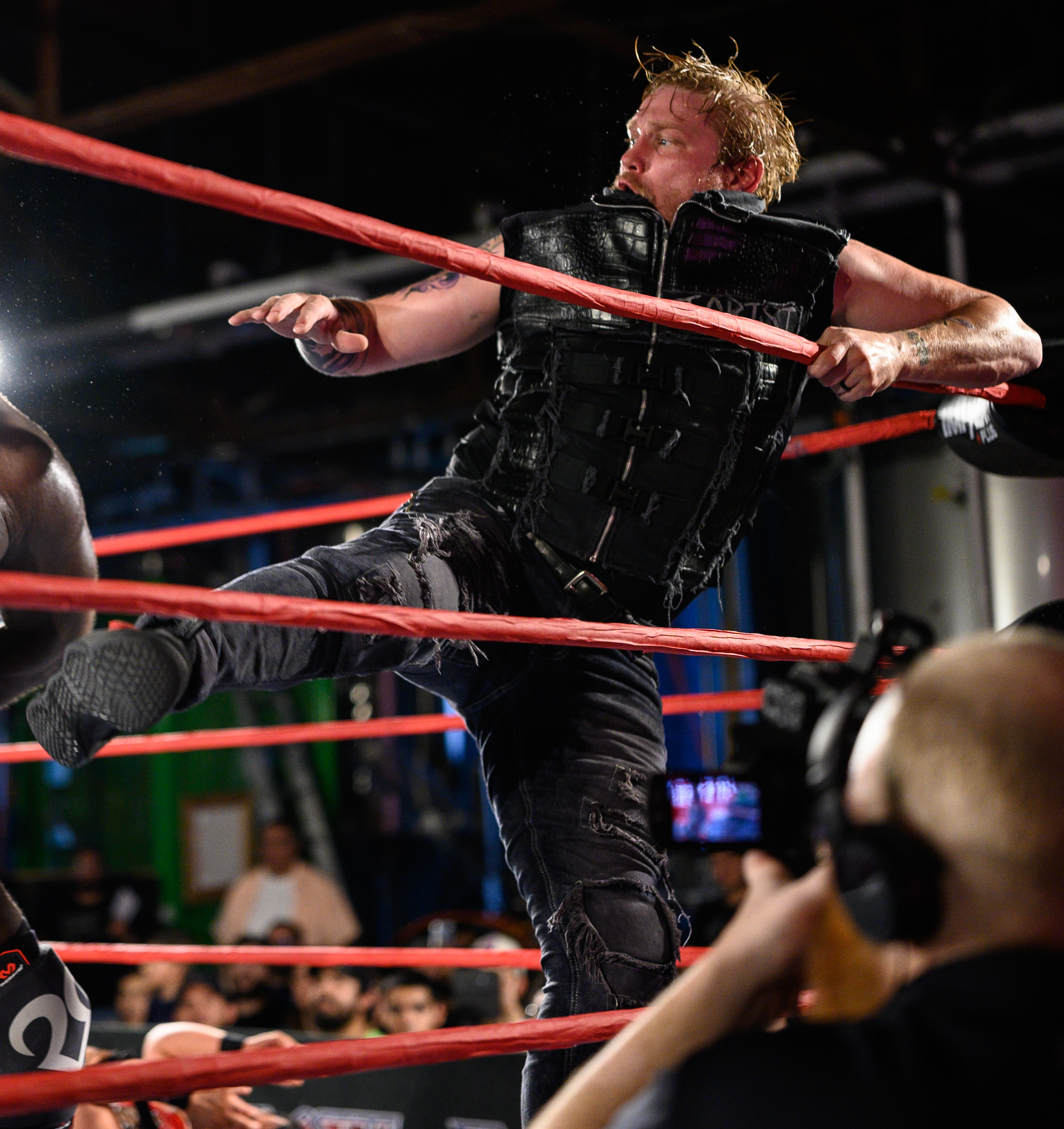
- Crist in 2019

Personal information
- Born: July 13, 1984 (age 42) New Carlisle, Ohio, United States
- Spouse: Nevaeh (m. 2013)
- Children: 2

Professional wrestling career
- Ring names: Crazy J; Jacob Crist; Jake Crist; Loto; Ring Ryda Red
- Billed height: 5 ft 8 in (1.73 m)
- Billed weight: 195 lb (88 kg)
- Billed from: Dayton, Ohio; Dublin, Ohio; Southwest Detroit
- Trained by: Bill Kovaleski; Matt Stryker
- Debut: 2003

John Crist (born July 13, 1984), better known by his ring name Jake Crist, is an American professional wrestler. He performs on the independent circuit – predominantly for The Wrestling Revolver (REVOLVER), where he is the second and current leader of Oi4k and one-third of the current Revolver World Tag Team Champions (with Rich Swann and Trey Miguel) in his first reign. He is best known for his time with Impact Wrestling, where he is a one-time Impact X Division Champion and one-time Impact World Tag Team Champion.

From 2003 until 2020, Crist was one-half of the Crist Brothers alongside his older brother Dave. For the majority of their careers, they wrestled on the Midwest independent circuit, most notably for the Heartland Wrestling Association (HWA), where they won the HWA Tag Team Championship a record six times. They also wrestled for Combat Zone Wrestling (CZW), Chikara, IWA Mid-South (IWA MS), and Ring of Honor (ROH), as well as Canadian promotions, Far North Wrestling (FNW) and UWA Hardcore Wrestling (UWA). After years of being The Irish Airborne, they changed their name to Ohio Is 4 Killers (OI4K) and later Ohio Versus Everything. Crist has also competed for Juggalo Championship Wrestling, where he is a former JCW Tag Team Champion.

== Professional wrestling career ==
=== Buckeye Pro Wrestling (2004) ===
Under the ring names Lotus and Crazy J respectively, Dave and Jake Crist made their debut in Buckeye Pro Wrestling against Dean and Chet Jablonski in which they lost the match. The Crists continued to wrestle their way through the ranks of BPW often feuding with the team of American Youth, ultimately defeating them on February 24, 2004 to become the BPW Tag Team Champions. During their time in BPW, the Irish Airborne had chances to work on cross promotion shows with Heartland Wrestling Association and were eventually offered a match with the HWA.

=== Heartland Wrestling Association (2004–2006) ===
The Irish Airborne then entered HWA, where they instantly became fan favorites due to their performance in BPW and the shared fan base. Their first match was a four-way tag match where they teamed up with Viper and Zeta against 4BJ, J.T. Stahr & Jimmy Turner & Ala Hussein. The Irish Airborne continued to have success in HWA leading to a tag team title championship victory against Necessary Roughness in May 2005. As success came quickly for the brothers, tension ensued, ultimately leading to a bloody feud that began in the Autumn 2005 and lasted through early 2006. The feud culminated in a best of seven series in which both brothers would attempt to top the other in amounts of violence and wit. The feud finally ended in one of HWA's bloodiest and most gruesome ladder matches to date. Both men realizing neither of them could top the other ended the feud and began to wrestle as a team once again.

=== Name change and Ring of Honor (2006–2007) ===
On January 27, 2006, the Crists were invited to wrestle a dark match in Ring of Honor against each other in which Lotus defeated Crazy J. The following night, they were again allowed to wrestle in a dark match, this time as a tag team against Shane Hagadorn & Conrad Kennedy III in which they won. On March 4, 2006, at an Insanity Pro Wrestling show in Indianapolis, Indiana, the Airborne announced that they would no longer use the ring names of Lotus and Crazy J, but instead under their real names of Dave and Jake Crist. John decided to use the first name "Jake" rather than John due to the fact there were too many well known Johns in professional wrestling. On March 11, 2006, at Arena Warfare, the Crists earned a roster spot with ROH as they took on and defeated Tony Mamaluke and Sal Rinauro at the New Alhambra Arena (now 2300 Arena).

=== Combat Zone Wrestling (2011–2012; 2014–2016) ===
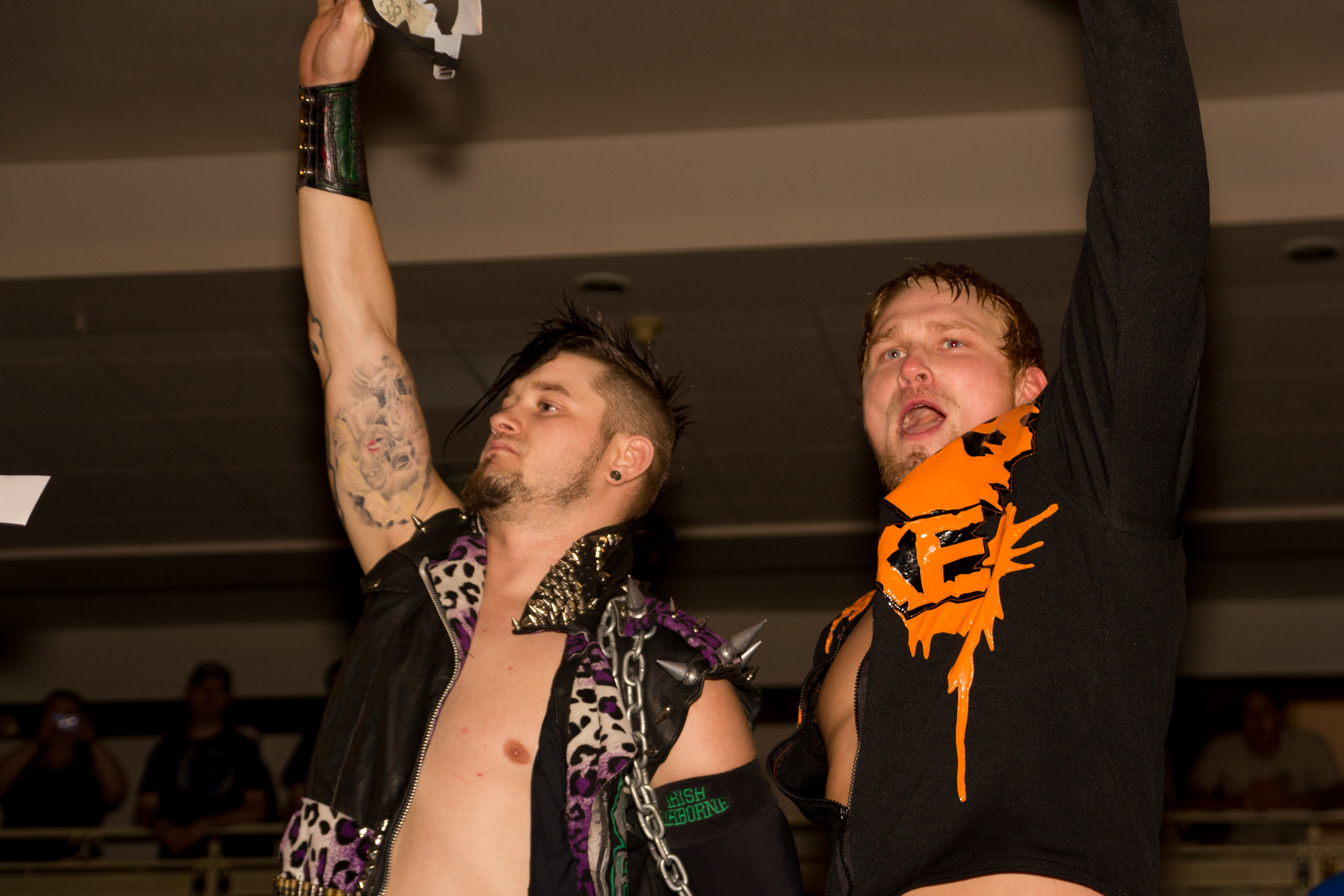
The Irish Airborne making their ring entrance in July 2012

On April 9, 2011, Crist was invited to compete in Combat Zone Wrestling's "Best Of The Best X" representing Insanity Pro Wrestling. He would go on to lose in the first round losing against Sami Callihan in a triple threat match that also involved AR Fox. The next night on April 10, 2011 at CZW's "International Incident", Crist would go on to wrestle Jon Moxley in Moxley's final match in CZW in another losing effort. After the match, Crist would be attacked by both Moxley and Robert Anthony until Devon Moore made the save. Crist return to CZW on May 14, 2011 in a losing effort against Ryan Mcbride; after which fans chanted "Please Come Back" after the match. On June 11, 2011, at CZW "Prelude To Violence", Crist was told by CZW Owner DJ Hyde that if Crist wanted a CZW Contract then he would have to go and defeat Sami Callihan. However Callihan would go on to defeat Crist again. After the match, both men showed respect by shaking hands. Adam Cole and Mia Yim would come down to mock Callihan. During the verbal confrontation DJ Hyde would come out and lariat Callihan. Jake Crist would try to save Callihan but wound up attacked by DJ Hyde. On July 9, 2011 at CZW "New Heights" AR Fox would offer a CZW Wired TV Championship title match to Crist. Crist would go on to gain his first win in CZW by defeating AR Fox to become the new CZW Wired TV Champion. On September 10, 2011, Crist was originally supposed to defend his newly won title against Chrisjen Hayme. However, Hayme would withdraw from the match and was replaced by Dustin Rayz. Crist would go on to retain against Dustin Rayz. Dave Crist though, would show more concern about his brothers' TV title than in Jake Crist's well being. After the show Dustin Rayz would confront the Irish Airborne about Dave getting involved in his match against Jake. Crist successfully defended his Wired TV title against Latin Dragon earlier that night. On April 14, 2012, he lost the title to his brother Dave after the latter used with a low blow to win the CZW Wired TV Championship. Upon entering CZW, the Irish Airborne formed Ohio is 4 Killers stable with Nevaeh and Sami Callihan.

On September 27, 2014, at Deja Vu, OI4K defeated the Juicy Product to win the CZW World Tag Team Championship. On July 11, 2015, at New Heights, OI4K lost the CZW World Tag Team Championship to Team Tremendous. In Infinity Pro Wrestling, the Crist Brothers defeated Donnie and Jacob Hollows.

=== Juggalo Championship Wrestling (2010–2016) ===
The Irish Airborne debuted in Juggalo Championship Wrestling on May 16, 2010 where they lost to JCW Tag Team Champions Thomaselli Brothers. On May 26, the tag team debuted as the masked tag team Ring Rydas. Jake and Dave, as Ring Ryda Red and Ring Ryda Blue respectively, lost to Thomaselli Brothers once again. At Oddball Wrestling 2010, the Ring Rydas defeated The Daivari Brothers (Shawn and Ariya Daivari). The following night at Bloodymania IV, the duo competed in a Fatal 4 way Tag Team match where they lost. At 2011's Up in Smoke, the duo defeated Mad Man Pondo and Necro Butcher to become JCW Tag Team Champions. At the next JCW iPPV "St. Andrews Brawl" they defeated the Haters, fka Thomaselli Brothers, in their first title defense. On July 28, the Ring Rydas lost the JCW Tag Team Championship to U-Gene and Zach Gowen. However, Gowen forfeited the championship after realizing that U-Gene cheated to win and gave the championships back to the Rydas. On December 20, 2014, at Big Ballas, Ring Rydas lost the title against The Hooligans.

=== Big Japan Pro Wrestling (2013) ===
On September 10, 2013, it was announce that the Irish Airborne would make their Japanese debuts in Big Japan Pro Wrestling, in which they would take part in the 2013 Dai Nihon Saikyo Tag League, which ran from September 25 to November 22. The Irish Airborne finished their tournament on October 18 with a record of two wins and three losses, failing to advance from their block.

=== Return to ROH (2017) ===
On June 4, 2017, Crist competed in a gauntlet match at ROH Gateway to Gold for a chance to compete against Christopher Daniels for his ROH World Title later that night. However, he lost to Jonathan Gresham.

=== Impact Wrestling (2017–2020) ===
On August 17, 2017, at Destination X, the Crists made their Impact Wrestling debut under the name Ohio Versus Everything (oVe), defeating Jason Cade and Zachary Wentz. At Victory Road, they defeated The Latin American Xchange (Santana and Ortiz) to win the GFW World Tag Team Championship. During their first reign, the championship was changed to the Impact World Tag Team Championship. On the October 12 episode of Impact!, LAX invoked their rematch clause by challenging oVe to a 5150 Street Fight at Bound for Glory.

At Bound for Glory on November 5, Callihan made his Impact debut as well as established his alliance with the Crists by helping them defeat LAX, with Crist himself low blowing Ortiz before Callihan delivered a piledriver through a table for the win. They proceeded to attack LAX after the match, resulting in a double turn, with oVe turning heel and adding Callihan the process. On the January 4, 2018 episode of Impact!, they lost the title to LAX, ending their reign at 164 days. OVe were later joined by Madman Fulton in March 2019.

On the July 26, 2019 episode of Impact!, Crist defeated Rich Swann to win the Impact X Division Championship. He then retained his title in a five-way match at Unbreakable and against Swann on the August 23 episode of Impact!. At Bound for Glory, Crist lost the X Division Championship to Ace Austin in an intergender ladder match also involving Tessa Blanchard, Daga, and Acey Romero, ending his reign at 93 days.

On the April 21, 2020 episode of Rebellion Callihan had a match against Ken Shamrock. During the match the other members of OVE, including Crist, interfered and attacked Shamrock. Callihan than attacked them thus leaving the group. On the May 19, 2020 episode of Impact, when Dave Crist was defeated by Crazzy Steve, Madman Fulton attacked both Crists and announced he quit OVE, disbanding the stable in the process. After turning on Dave, Jake joined the censorious stable called "Cancel Culture" along with Joey Ryan and Rob Van Dam. However, this story abruptly ended when Ryan's contract was terminated alongside Dave Crist amid over a dozen allegations of sexual assault. On December 15, Crist announced his departure from the company.

=== Independent circuit (2020–present) ===
On September 11, 2021, at Ted Petty Invitational 2021, Crist won the IWA Mid-South Heavyweight Championship for the third time. One month later, he also won the IWA Mid-South Junior Heavyweight Championship before vacating both titles for not being paid for one month.

=== Returns to Impact Wrestling (2021, 2023) ===
On the September 2, 2021 episode of Impact!, Crist answered Josh Alexander's open challenge for the X Division Championship in a losing effort. On May 26, 2023, at Under Siege, Crist was revealed as the mystery partner of Rich Swann and Sami Callihan, defeating The Design (Deaner, Angels, and Kon).

== Personal life ==
Crist is married to fellow professional wrestler Nevaeh. The couple were childhood sweethearts while attending Tecumseh High School and have a daughter, Brooklynn, who was born when both were teenagers. Nevaeh gave birth to the couple's second daughter, Johnnie, on November 23, 2015.

== Championships and accomplishments ==
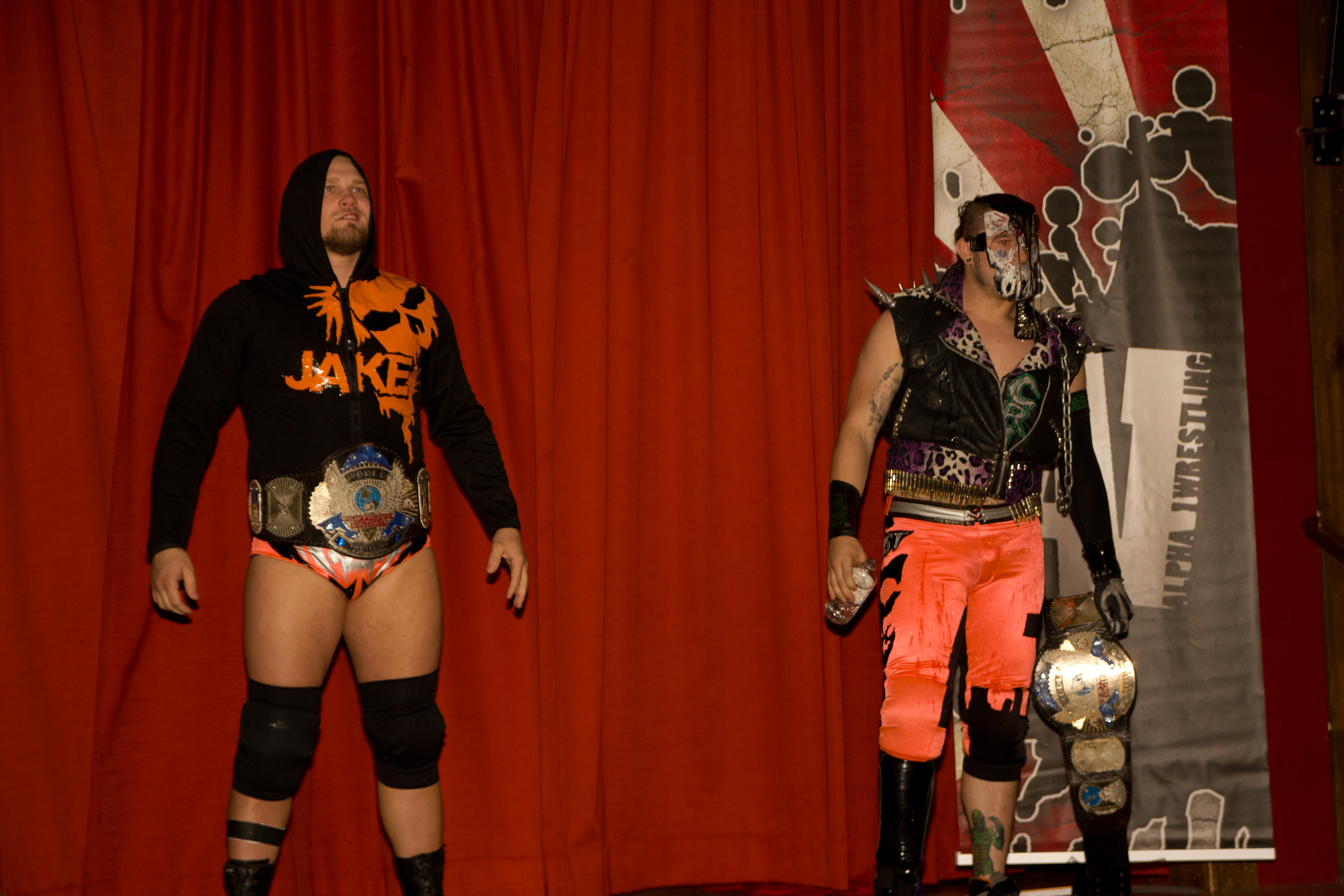
Crist (left) with one-half of the A1 Tag Team Championships

- All American Wrestling
  - AAW Tag Team Championship (4 times) – with Dave Crist
- Alpha-1 Wrestling
  - A1 Tag Team Championship (1 time) – with Dave Crist
- Absolute Intense Wrestling
  - AIW Tag Team Championship (1 time) – with Dave Crist
- American Pro Wrestling Alliance
  - APWA World Tag Team Championship (1 time) – with Dave Crist
- Collective League Of Adrenaline Strength And Honor
  - CLASH Championship (1 time)
- Combat Zone Wrestling
  - CZW Wired TV Championship (1 time)
  - CZW World Tag Team Championship (1 time) – with Dave Crist
- Destination One Wrestling
  - D1W Tag Team Championship (1 time) – with Dave Crist
- Heartland Wrestling Association
  - HWA Heavyweight Championship (2 times)
  - HWA Television Championship (1 times)
  - HWA Tag Team Championship (3 times) – with Dave Crist
  - HWA Heartland Cup (2011)
- Impact Wrestling
  - Impact X Division Championship (1 time)
  - Impact World Tag Team Championship (1 time) – with Dave Crist
- Infinity Pro Reign
  - Infinity Pro Duos Championship (1 time) – with Dave Crist
- Insane Wrestling Revolution
  - IWR United States Championship (1 time, current)
- Insanity Pro Wrestling
  - IPW World Heavyweight Championship (1 time, final)
  - IPW Junior Heavyweight Championship (3 times)
  - IPW Tag Team Championship (2 times) – with Dave Crist
  - IPW Super Junior Heavyweight Tournament (2005)
- IWA East Coast
  - IWA East Coast Tag Team Championship (1 time) – with Dave Crist
- Independent Wrestling Association Mid-South
  - IWA Mid-South Heavyweight Championship (3 time, final)
  - IWA Mid-South Junior Heavyweight Championship (3 time, final)
  - IWA Mid-South Tag Team Championship (2 times) - with John Wayne Murdoch (1) and Corey Storm (1)
  - First Triple Crown Champion
- International Wrestling Cartel
  - IWC Tag Team Championship (1 time) – with Dave Crist
- Juggalo Championship Wrestling
  - JCW Tag Team Championship (5 times) – with Dave Crist as the Ring Rydas
- Pro Wrestling Illustrated
  - Ranked Jake No. 135 of the top 500 singles wrestlers in the PWI 500 in 2018
- Rockstar Pro Wrestling
  - Rockstar Pro Championship (1 time)
  - Rockstar Pro Tag Team Championship (2 times) – with Aaron Williams (1), and Ron Mathis (1)
  - Cicero Cup (2014)
- The Wrestling Revolver
  - Revolver World Championship (1 time)
  - Revolver Remix Championship (1 time)
  - Revolver World Tag Team Championship (1 time, current) – with Rich Swann and Trey Miguel
- Xtreme Intense Championship Wrestling
  - XICW Xtreme Intense Championship (1 time, current)
