= Wrestling Revolver =

American professional wrestling promotion

- The Wrestling Revolver logo
- Founded: 2016
- Style: Pro wrestling
- Headquarters: Des Moines, Iowa, U.S.
- Founder: Sami Callihan
- Owner: Sami Callihan
- Formerly: Pro Wrestling Revolver (PWR)
- Website: Pro Wrestling Revolver

The Wrestling Revolver (Revolver), formerly known as Pro Wrestling Revolver (PWR), is an American independent professional wrestling promotion based in Des Moines, Iowa founded by Sami Callihan.

== History ==
=== Early years (2016–2019) ===
On June 10, 2016, Revolver held their first show titled The Debut at the 7 Flags Event Center in Clive, Iowa. The event featured various notable wrestlers such as Scotty 2 Hotty, Tommy Dreamer, Billy Gunn, Bob Holly, and Rhyno. On April 1, 2017, Revolver crowned their first champion when Jason Cade was crowned the inaugural PWR Scramble Champion at the Pancakes & Piledrivers event at the Wyndham Orlando Resort International Drive hotel in Orlando, Florida during WrestleMania 33 weekend. On April 3, 2017, Revolver teamed up with WrestleCircus (WC) to present the Midnight-Ish After Mania pay-per-view at The Plaza Live in Orlando, Florida which featured matches for the WrestleCircus Ringmaster Championship, the WC Lady of the Ring Championship, and the WC Sideshow Championship which AR Fox won in an elimination match. On May 5, 2017, the DDT Ironman Heavymetalweight Championship was defended at Revolver's Plead The Fifth event at the 7 Flags Event Center in Clive, Iowa as Joey Ryan defeated AR Fox to win not only the PWR Scramble Championship but also the WC Sideshow Championship. On August 4, 2017, Revolver teamed up with Rockstar Pro Wrestling to present the Catalina Wrestling Mixer event from the Rockstar Pro Arena in Dayton, Ohio which was headlined by a tournament to decide the inaugural PWR Catalina Wrestling Mixer Champion. On February 16, 2018, Revolver crowned the inaugural PWR Tag Team Champions as the Besties in the World (Davey Vega and Mat Fitchett) were crowned the inaugural champions in a four way match.

On May 5, 2018, Revolver teamed up with Impact Wrestling to present Penta Does Iowa from the Val Air Ballroom in Des Moines, Iowa which was streamed live on Twitch with the main event being Pentagon Jr. defending the Impact World Championship against Jimmy Jacobs. On December 28, 2018, Revolver held a tournament during their Holiday Hangover to crown the inaugural Revolver champion in which Matt Palmer was crowned the inaugural champion in a four way match against Larry D, Shane Strickland, and Trey Miguel. On April 6, 2019, Revolver presented the third annual Pancakes & Piledrivers 3 pay-per-view from the Hilton New York Midtown hotel in New York City as part of WrestleMania 35 weekend and featured Rich Swann defending the Impact X Division Championship against Chuck Mambo. On October 4, 2019, Revolver teamed up with Impact Wrestling to present the Tales From The Ring 3 event which was streamed live on Twitch. During the event, there was also a dark match for the Revolver Championship in which Killer Kross defeated champion Larry D and Madman Fulton to win the title. On December 7, 2019, the two promotions presented their final cross-promotional event in the form of No Surrender which featured Revolver owner Sami Callihan defending the Impact World Championship against Rich Swann.

=== Full-time move to livestreaming and FITE TV/Triller TV, and brief hiatus (2020–2026) ===
On February 14, 2020, Revolver presented its first event to be streamed live on FITE TV titled the Valentine's Day Massacre. Beginning with this show, Revolver shifted to a full time livestreamed pay-per-view format. However, this would be the last show before a one-year hiatus due to the COVID-19 pandemic. On October 30, 2021, Revolver made its return with the Tales from the Ring 4 pay-per-view at the Horizon Events Center in Clive, Iowa in which three new champions were crowned after the promotion's championships were deactivated including the PWR Tag Team Championship and the Revolver Championship which were won by The American Wolves (Davey Richards and Eddie Edwards) against Infrared (Logan James and Tyler Matrix) and Rich Swann against Jake Manning, JT Dunn, and Trey Miguel along with crowning the inaugural PWR Remix Champion in which Ace Austin defeated Alex Zayne to be crowned the inaugural champion. On May 27, 2022, Revolver presented its first co-produced show with Future Stars of Wrestling (FSW) from the Silver Nugget Casino in Las Vegas, Nevada. The following night, Revolver presented their Vegas Vacation pay-per-view from the same venue which featured Matt Cardona defending the Impact Digital Media Championship against Rich Swann.

On November 17, 2023, recently released WWE wrestler and mixed martial arts fighter Ronda Rousey made her Revolver debut during the promotion's Unreal pay-per-view in Los Angeles, California in a tag team match in which she teamed up with Marina Shafir against Athena and Billie Starkz. On July 8, 2023, Revolver made its Texas debut with the Texas Toast’D pay-per-view at The Epic in Grand Prairie, Texas which featured Mike Bailey fighting against JD Griffey in a no ropes fight pit match as the main event. On October 8, 2024, Revolver held the inaugural Women's Grand Prix tournament which was an all-women's professional wrestling tournament which featured Billie Starkz, Marina Shafir, Vert Vixen, Trish Adora, Allysin Kay, Rachel Armstrong, Janai Kai, and Emi Sakura. On April 5, 2024, Revolver teamed up with House of Glory (HOG) to present the Revolver x HOG pay-per-view at the Trinity Center for Urban Life in Philadelphia, Pennsylvania which featured Mustafa Ali defending the TNA X Division Championship against Amazing Red, Mike Santana defending the HOG Heavyweight Championship against Alex Shelley who was defending the Revolver Championship, Carlos Ramirez defending the HOG Crown Jewel Championship against 1 Called Manders, and The Mane Event (Jay Lyon and Midas Black) defending the HOG Tag Team Championship against The Rascalz (Trey Miguel and Zachary Wentz), the Grizzled Young Veterans (James Drake and Zack Gibson), and RED (Alex Colon and Rickey Shane Page). On November 22, 2025, Revolver presented the WrestleKombat pay-per-view in association with Arrival Wrestling at the Heart Ballroom in Newark, New Jersey which also featured Steve Maclin defending the TNA International Championship against Kevin Blackwood.

=== Move to YouTube (2026–present) ===
On April 22, 2026, Revolver announced that they would be leaving Triller TV in favor of streaming their events for free on YouTube beginning with Revolver Strong which took place on April 25, 2026 at the Calumet Center in Dayton, Ohio. The event featured the Revolver debuts of EC3 who had recently signed with Total Nonstop Action Wrestling, the former Juggalo Championship Wrestling (JCW) Tag Team Champions and the Outbreak and their manager Barnabas the Bizarre, and the retirement match for Jeremy Ganger.

== Championships and other accomplishments ==
=== Current champions ===
Championship	Current champion(s)	Reign	Date won	Days held	Location	Notes	Ref.
Revolver World Championship	Damian Chambers	1	August 15, 2026	95+	Dayton, Ohio	This was Chambers' Golden Ticket cash-in match, which was originally a three-way match between previous champion Mance Warner, Alex Colon, and Krule in a Cage of Horrors match at Cage of Horrors 5, but converted into a four-way match after Chambers cashed-in his Golden Ticket mid-match, with Chambers pinning Colon to win the title.	
Revolver Remix Championship	Zachary Wentz	1	October 2, 2026	47+	Dayton, Ohio	Defeated Brent Oakley at Tales from the Ring 9.	
Revolver Texas Championship	KJ Orso	1	September 27, 2025	417+	Bedford, Texas	Defeated Brick Savage at Redemption to win the vacant title.	
Revolver 24/7 Scramble Championship	Gringo Loco	1	October 2, 2026	47+	Dayton, Ohio	Defeated previous champion Crash, Troy Parker, Harley Rock, Kristian Robinson, Kiran Grey, and Bigg Pound in a seven-way scramble at Tales from the Ring 9.	
Revolver World Tag Team Championship	Oi4K (Jake Crist, Rich Swann, and Trey Miguel)	1 (1, 2, 4)	August 15, 2026	95+	Dayton, Ohio	Defeated Tye Or Die (Ryan Matthias, KJ Reynolds, and Amazanga) at Cage of Horrors 5.	

=== Golden Ticket ===
==== List of winners ====
#	Winner	Times won	Event	Date	Location	Ref.
1	Steve Maclin	1	Season Finale	December 3, 2022	Clive, Iowa	
2	Damian Chambers	1	Wrestling Revolver and the Ring of Destiny	June 17, 2023	Dayton, Ohio	
3	Ace Austin	1	Season Finale	December 2, 2023	Clive, Iowa	
4	Myron Reed	1	Bad Trip	October 19, 2024	Dayton, Ohio	
5	BDE	1	Cage of Horrors	June 14, 2025	Clive, Iowa	
6	Alan Angels	1	Season Finale	December 13, 2025	Des Moines, Iowa	
7	Damian Chambers	2	Cage of Horrors	August 15, 2026	Dayton, Ohio	

==== Cash-in match ====
Won the title
Failed to win the title

#	Golden Ticket winner	Championship	Event	Date	Location	Result	Ref.
1	Steve Maclin	Revolver World Championship	Season Finale	December 3, 2022	Clive, Iowa	Defeated Trey Miguel.	
2	Damian Chambers	Revolver World Championship	Unreal	November 16, 2023	Los Angeles, California	Lost to champion Jake Crist in a Scramble match that also featured Alan Angels, Chris Bey, Rocky Romero, and Sonico.	
3	Ace Austin	Revolver World Championship	Cage of Horrors	June 22, 2024	Clive, Iowa	Lost to Alex Shelley.	
4	Myron Reed	Revolver World Championship	Season Finale	December 7, 2024	Clive, Iowa	Defeated Ace Austin.	
5	BDE	Revolver Remix Championship	Tales from the Ring	October 3, 2025	Dayton, Ohio	Defeated A.J. Franci$.	
6	Alan Angels	Revolver World Championship	Kross Hour	February 5, 2026	Dayton, Ohio	Lost to new champion Krule in a three-way match that also featured previous champion Myron Reed.	
7	Damian Chambers	Revolver World Championship	Cage of Horrors	August 15, 2026	Dayton, Ohio	Defeated previous champion Mance Warner, Alex Colon, and Krule in a Cage of Horrors match.	

=== Tournaments ===
==== Championship tournaments ====
===== Inaugural Revolver Championship tournament =====
This nine-person single-elimination tournament was held to crown the inaugural Revolver Champion. It took place at Holiday Hangover on December 28, 2018. The winner of the tournament and inaugural Revolver Champion was Matthew Palmer.

===== Revolver Texas Title Tournament =====
This eight-person single-elimination tournament was held to crown the inaugural Revolver Texas Champion. It took place at Texas Title Tournament on June 28, 2025. The winner of the tournament and inaugural Revolver Texas Champion was Brick Savage.

==== The F'n Catalina Wrestling Mixer Tournament ====
===== 2017 =====
2017 F'n Catalina Wrestling Mixer Tournament bracket – Winner: Rey Fénix

First round The Catalina Wrestling Mixer (Note: This was co-produced by Rockstar Pro Wrestling.); August 4, 2017
Alex Colon	14:51
AR Fox	Win (Note: This was a Street Fight.)
Ethan Page	6:24
Simon Grimm	Win
Jeremiah	7:53
Rey Fénix	Win
Maxwell Jacob Friedman	9:06
Shane Strickland	Win

Semifinals; The Catalina Wrestling Mixer; August 4, 2017
AR Fox	Win
Simon Grimm	7:39
Rey Fénix	Win
Shane Strickland	5:27

Final; The Catalina Wrestling Mixer; August 4, 2017
AR Fox	6:46
Rey Fénix	Win

===== 2018 =====
2018 F'n Catalina Wrestling Mixer Tournament bracket – Winners: The Rascalz (Dezmond Xavier and Zachary Wentz)

First round The Catalina Wrestling Mixer Vol. 2 August 3, 2018
Latin American Exchange (Ortiz and Santana)	Win
Ove (Dave Crist and Jake Crist)	9:01
Besties in the World (Davey Vega and Mat Fitchett)	Win
The Rascalz (Myron Reed and Trey Miguel	8:40
Jason Cade and Shane Strickland	Win
The Night Ryderz (Alex Colon and Dustin Rayz)	8:19
The Killer Death Machines (Jessicka Havok and Nevaeh)	6:39
The Rascalz (c) (Note: This first round match was also for the Revolver Tag Team Championship.) (Dezmond Xavier and Zachary Wentz)	Win

Semifinals; The Catalina Wrestling Mixer Vol. 2 August 3, 2018
Latin American Exchange	Win
The Besties in the World	8:30
Jason Cade and Shane Strickland	6:40
The Rascalz (Dezmond Xavier and Zachary Wentz)	Win

Final; The Catalina Wrestling Mixer Vol. 2 August 3, 2018
Latin American Exchange	10:55
The Rascalz (Dezmond Xavier and Zachary Wentz)	Win

===== 2019 =====
2019 F'n Catalina Wrestling Mixer Tournament bracket – Winners: Jessicka Havok

First round The Catalina Wrestling Mixer Vol. 3 August 23, 2019
Ace Austin	Win
Kris Statlander	9:05
Jake Crist
Nevaeh	Win
Ace Romero	Win
Zoey Skye
Jody Threat
Rickey Shane Page	Win
Daga
Tessa Blanchard	Win
Jessicka Havok	Win
Jimmy Havoc

Final; The Catalina Wrestling Mixer Vol. 3 August 23, 2019
Ace Austin	—
Nevaeh	—
Ace Romero	—
Rickey Shane Page	—
Tessa Blanchard
Jessicka Havok	Win

Tournament final – Order of elimination
#	Wrestler	Elim.	Eliminated by
1	Ace Austin	0	Nevaeh
2	Nevaeh	2	Rickey Shane Page
3	Ace Romero	0	Nevaeh
4	Rickey Shane Page	1	Jessicka Havok
5	Tessa Blanchard	0	Jessicka Havok
—	Jessicka Havok	2	Winner

==== Women's Grand Prix Tournament ====
Women's Grand Prix Tournament bracket – Winner: Billie Starkz

First round Women's Grand Prix; October 8, 2023
Allysin Kay	9:17
Vert Vixen	Win
Janai Kai	3:52
Marina Shafir	Win
Emi Sakura	8:48
Trish Adora	Win
Billie Starkz	Win
Rachel Armstrong	6:56

Semifinals; Women's Grand Prix; October 8, 2023
Vert Vixen	2:15
Marina Shafir	Win
Trish Adora	8:40
Billie Starkz	Win

Final; Women's Grand Prix; October 8, 2023
Marina Shafir	11:42
Billie Starkz	Win

==== Jerry Lynn Invitational ====
The Jerry Lynn Invitational is a single-elimination tournament that featured 15 male and female wrestlers. The tournament was created to honor Jerry Lynn, who served as the referee in the tournament final. The tournament was split into two shows, both held on the same day, August 9, 2025; the first round took place in the first show, while the semifinals and final were held in the second show. The tournament was won by Rich Swann.

Jerry Lynn Invitational bracket – Winner: Rich Swann

First round matches – Jerry Lynn Invitational Part 1 (August 9, 2025)
No.	Results	Stipulations	Times
1	Alan Angels defeated Brick Savage, Crash Jaxon, Facade, Juni Underwood, and Jeffrey John by pinfall	Wildcard Scramble match	9:03
2	Rich Swann defeated BDE, Brent Oakley, and Jake Crist by pinfall	Fatal four-way match	10:57
3	Ninja Mack defeated Dante Leon and Gringo Loco by pinfall	Triple threat match	18:56
4	Zachary Wentz defeated Priscilla Kelly by pinfall	Singles match	7:56

Semifinals; Jerry Lynn Invitational Part 2 August 9, 2025
Ninja Mack	9:29
Rich Swann	Pinfall
Alan Angels	Pinfall
Zachary Wentz	6:30

Final; Jerry Lynn Invitational Part 2 August 9, 2025
Rich Swann	Pinfall
Alan Angels	19:46

=== 2025 Year-End Awards ===
Award	Winner		Runner-up		Ref.
Award	Recipient(s)	Vote %	Recipient(s)	Vote %	Ref.
Wrestler of the Year	Myron Reed	34%	BDE	32%	
Tag Team of the Year	Alpha Sig (Brent Oakley, Dick Meyers, and KC Jacobs)	22%	The Rascalz (Dezmond Xavier, Myron Reed, Trey Miguel, and Zachary Wentz)	21%	
Show of the Year	Wrestle Kombat	11%	Vybe Check	10%	
One to Watch in 2026	Tye or Die (KJ Reynolds and Ryan Matthias)	17%	Bigg Pound	14%	
Moment of the Year	Chris Danger turns on BDE	31%	Dezmond Xavier returns	28%	
Match of the Year	BDE vs. Chris Danger	10%	Krule vs. Bear Bronson	9%	
