= Revolver Remix Championship =

Professional wrestling championship

- The Revolver Remix Championship belt

Details
- Promotion: The Wrestling Revolver
- Date established: October 14, 2021
- Current champion: Zachary Wentz
- Date won: October 2, 2026
Statistics
- First champion: Ace Austin
- Most reigns: BDE (2 reigns)
- Longest reign: Alex Shelley (490 days)
- Shortest reign: Jake Crist (27 days)
- Oldest champion: Jake Crist (40 years, 309 days)
- Youngest champion: Ace Austin (24 years, 244 days)
- Heaviest champion: A.J. Franci$ (330 lb (150 kg))
- Lightest champion: Lince Dorado (169 lb (77 kg))

The Revolver Remix Championship is a professional wrestling championship created and promoted by The Wrestling Revolver. Established on October 14, 2021, the title replaced the retired Open Invite Scramble Championship. The champion has the right to set the stipulation for their title defenses. The current champion is Zachary Wentz, who is in his first reign. He won the title by defeating Brent Oakley at Tales from the Ring IX on October 2, 2026.

== History ==
On October 14, 2021, The Wrestling Revolver announced the Revolver Remix Championship, a professional wrestling championship. It was created to replace the retired Open Invite Scramble Championship. The champion has the right to set the stipulation for their title defenses. The inaugural champion was Ace Austin, who won the title by defeating Alex Zayne at Tales from the Ring on October 30.

== Reigns ==
As of November 7, 2026, there have been 14 reigns among 13 different champions with two vacancies. Ace Austin was the inaugural champion. BDE has the most reigns at two. Alex Shelley has the longest reign in the title's history at 490 days, while Jake Crist has the shortest reign at 27 days. The oldest champion is Crist, who won the title at 40 years and 309 days old, while the youngest champion is Austin, who won the title at 24 years and 244 days old.

Zachary Wentz is the current champion in his first reign. He won the title by defeating Brent Oakley at Tales from the Ring IX on October 2, 2026, in Dayton, Ohio.

Key
No.	Overall reign number
Reign	Reign number for the specific champion
Days	Number of days held

No.	Champion	Championship change			Reign statistics		Notes	Ref.
No.	Champion	Date	Event	Location	Reign	Days	Notes	Ref.
1	Ace Austin	October 30, 2021	Tales from the Ring	Clive, IA	1	168	Defeated Alex Zayne to become the inaugural champion.	
2	Trey Miguel	April 16, 2022	Swerve's House	Clive, IA	1	210	This four-way Winner Takes All match also featured Blake Christian and Lince Dorado, where Miguel's Impact X Division Championship was also on the line.	
3	Alex Shelley	November 12, 2022	Smoke 'Em if Ya Got 'Em	Dayton, OH	1	490	This was an Iron Man match, where Shelley won in overtime 7–6.	
—	Vacated	January 27, 2024	—	—	—	—	After winning the Revolver World Championship at Mox vs. Gringo on January 25, previous champion Alex Shelley voluntarily relinquished the Revolver Remix Championship.	
4	Gringo Loco	March 16, 2024	Ready or Not!	Clive, IA	1	161	Defeated Brent Oakley, Damian Chambers, Jake Crist, Kevin Knight, Myron Reed, and Warhorse in a seven-way Invitational Scramble match to win the vacant title.	
5	Lince Dorado	August 24, 2024	Taste of Truth	Dayton, OH	1	105		
6	Jake Something	December 7, 2024	Season Finale	Clive, IA	1	55	This five-way Open Scramble match also featured Crash Jaxon, Damian Chambers, and JJ Garrett.	
—	Vacated	January 29, 2025	—	—	—	—	Wrestling Revolver stripped the title off of previous champion Jake Something due to injury.	
7	Crash Jaxon	January 31, 2025	Square Game	Indianapolis, IN	1	107	Defeated Brayden Lee, Dark Pledge, Dex Royal, Jeffrey John, and Leon Ruffin in a six-way scramble match to win the vacant title.	
8	Jake Crist	May 18, 2025	Let Us Cook	Dayton, OH	1	27		
9	A.J. Franci$	June 14, 2025	Cage of Horrors	Des Moines, IA	1	111		
10	BDE	October 3, 2025	Tales from the Ring	Dayton, OH	1	49	This was BDE's Golden Ticket title opportunity.	
11	Chris Danger	November 21, 2025	WrestleKombat	Newark, NJ	1	76	This was co-produced by Arrival Wrestling.	
12	BDE	February 5, 2026	Kross Hour	Dayton, OH	2	127	This was a Danger, Ladders, and Chairs match.	
13	Brent Oakley	June 12, 2026	No Country for Ole Mancer	Dayton, OH	1	112	This was a Dayton Street Fight.	
14	Zachary Wentz	October 2, 2026	Tales from the Ring IX	Dayton, OH	1	36+		

== Combined reigns ==
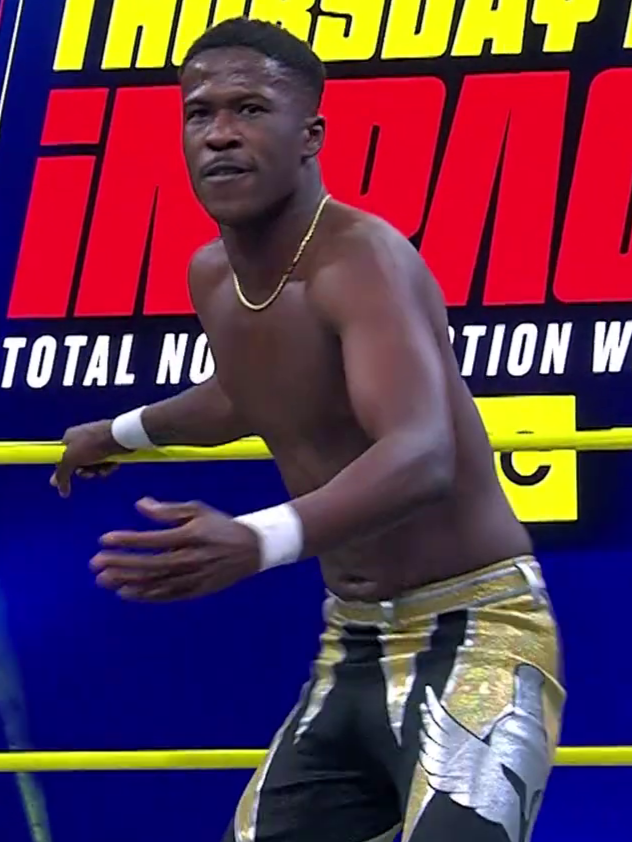
Two-time champion BDE has the most reigns.

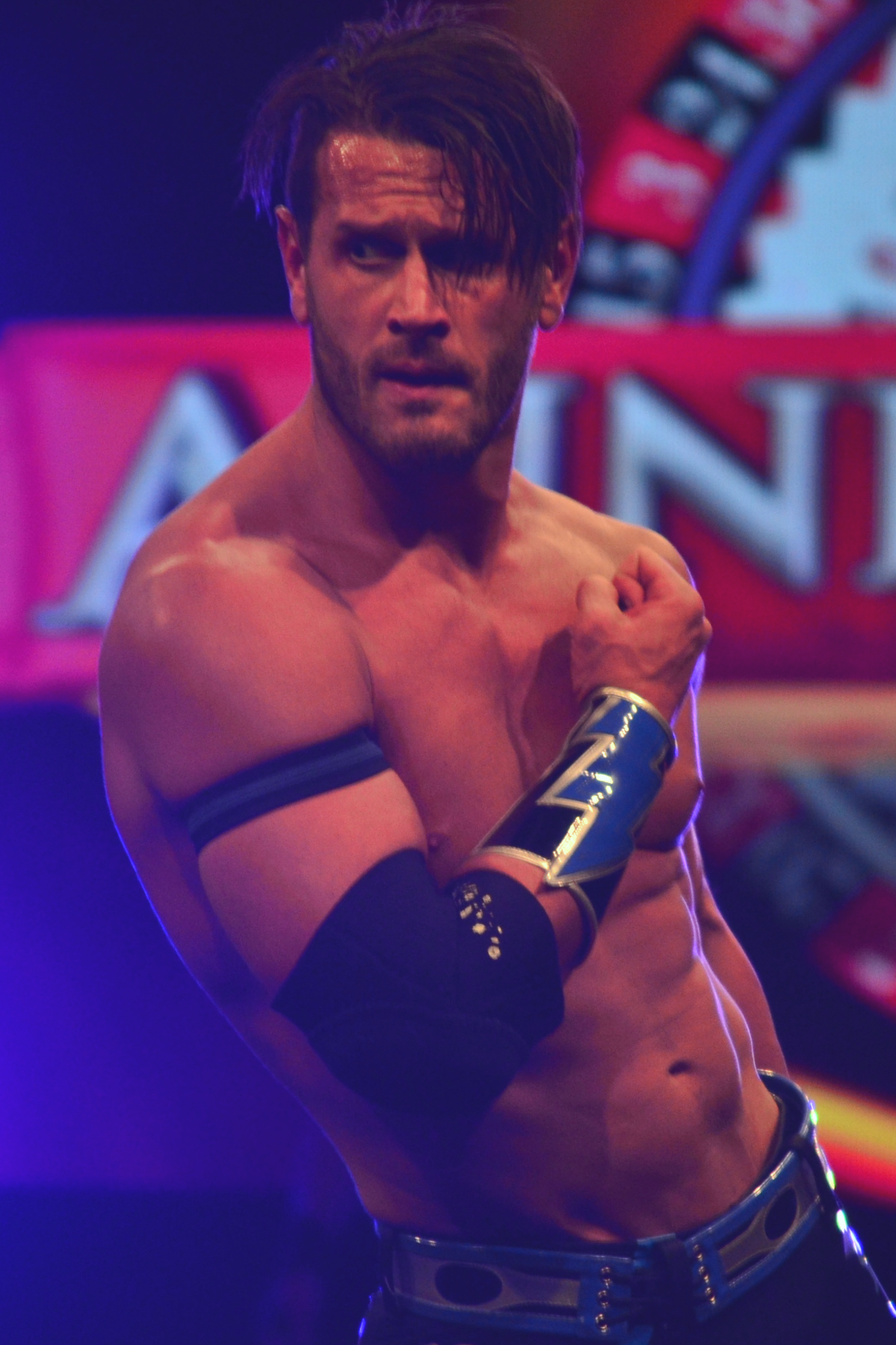
Alex Shelley has the longest reign at 490 days.

As of November 7, 2026.

†	Indicates the current champion

Rank	Wrestler	No. of reigns	Combined days
1	Alex Shelley	1	490
2	Trey Miguel	1	210
3	BDE	2	176
4	Ace Austin	1	168
5	Gringo Loco	1	161
6	Brent Oakley	1	112
7	A.J. Franci$	1	111
8	Crash Jaxon	1	107
9	Lince Dorado	1	105
10	Chris Danger	1	76
11	Jake Something	1	55
12	Zachary Wentz †	1	36+
13	Jake Crist	1	27
