= Trey Miguel =

American wrestler (born 1994)

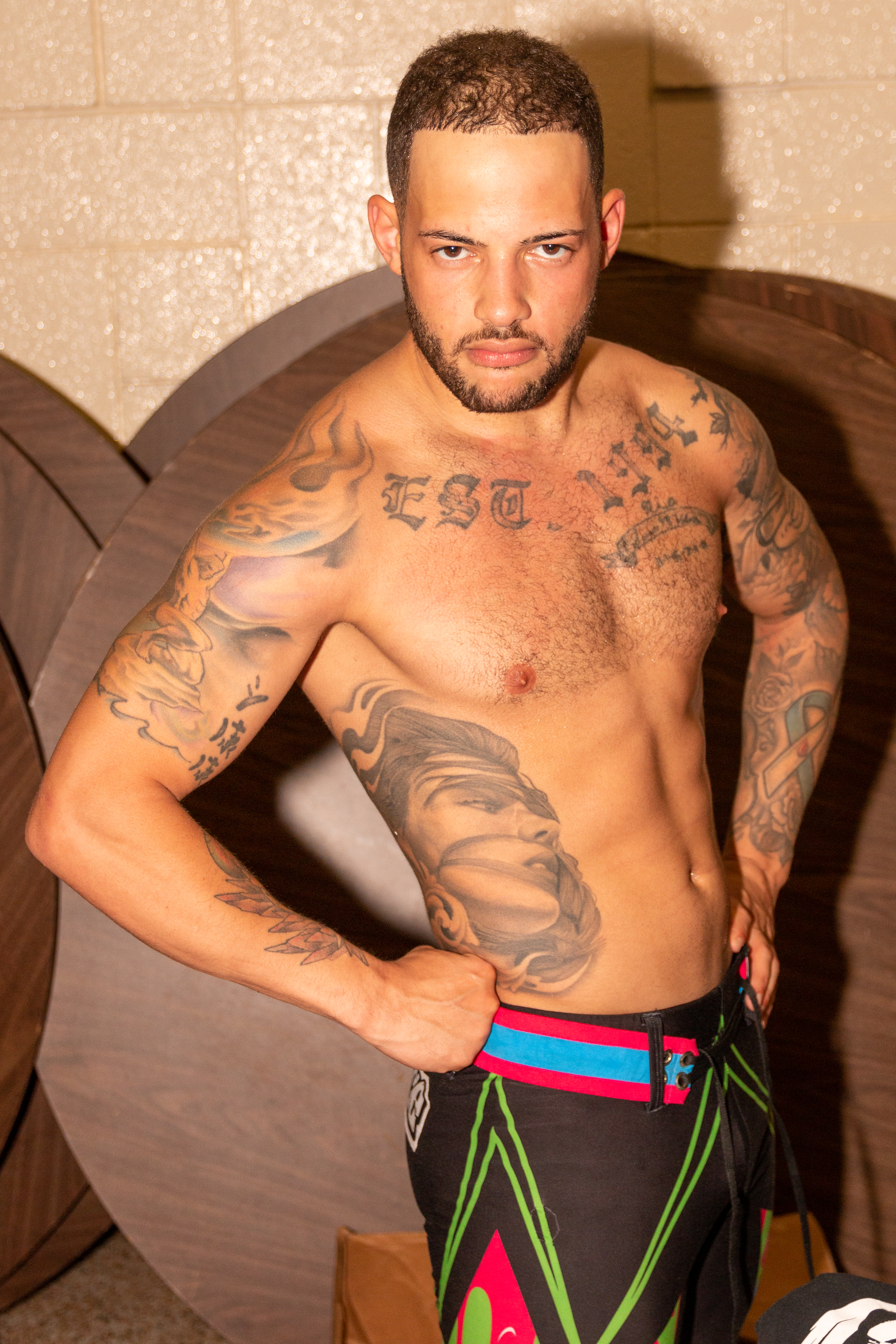
- Miguel in 2019

Personal information
- Born: Trey Miguel McBrayer; August 30, 1994 (age 32) Toledo, Ohio, U.S.

Professional wrestling career
- Ring name(s): Trey; Trey Miguel; Bill Ding
- Billed height: 5 ft 9 in (175 cm)
- Billed weight: 172 lb (78 kg)
- Billed from: Toledo, Ohio
- Trained by: Dave Crist
- Debut: August 1, 2009

Trey Miguel McBrayer (born August 30, 1994), better known by his ring name Trey Miguel, is an American professional wrestler. He is signed to Total Nonstop Action Wrestling (TNA). He also makes appearances on the independent circuit – predominantly for The Wrestling Revolver (REVOLVER), where he is a member of Oi4k and one-third of the current Revolver World Tag Team Champions with fellow stablemates Jake Crist and Rich Swann in their first reign as a team.

== Early life ==
Trey Miguel McBrayer was born on August 30, 1994, in Toledo, Ohio.

== Professional wrestling career ==
=== Independent circuit (2009–present) ===
McBrayer began training sometime in 2009 at the Glass City Pro Wrestling School until he eventually moved to Dayton, Ohio, where he studied under the tutelage of Dave Crist.

On July 8, 2017, Miguel teamed with his future partners Dezmond Xavier and Zachary Wentz for the first time to defeat Ohio Is 4 Killers (Dave Crist, Jake Crist and Sami Callihan) in a doors match at CZW's iPPV EVILution. On April 17, 2018, at CZW's Welcome to the Combat Zone, Miguel was introduced as the newest member of The Rascalz (formed by Xavier and Wentz) alongside Myron Reed. After this, Miguel and Reed began teaming across the entire independent circuit while Wentz and Xavier, the other two Rascalz members teamed as well. Together, Miguel and Reed won the IWA Mid-South Tag Team Championship once on March 8 and the Rockstar Pro Trios Championship twice (once with Alex Colon and Dustin Rayz), on May 4 and May 9 respectively.

On September 1, 2017, Miguel defeated Jeremiah for the Rockstar Pro Championship, a title which he held for 91 days before dropping it to Jake Crist. Miguel then regained the title on February 2, 2018, defeating Crist but later that same night he lost the title to Jon Murray.

At a cross promotional event for Fight Club: PRO and Destiny Wrestling on April 4, 2019, Miguel defeated Penelope Ford, Kip Sabian, and Jake Atlas for the vacant Destiny Wrestling Next Generation Championship. He then made his first title defense on August 9, against Aiden Prince, Kevin Blackwood, Lionel Knight and Ryan Wright in a successful attempt.

On May 12, 2019, Miguel and Wentz won the WC Big Top Tag Team Championship at WrestleCircus event Encore by defeating The Dirty Devils (Andy Dalton and Isaiah James) and The Riegel Twins (Logan and Sterling) in a three-way match. After a successful title defense against Riegel Twins and Private Party at Big Top Revival, Miguel and Wentz vacated the titles on July 25.

=== Impact Wrestling / Total Nonstop Action Wrestling (2017–present) ===
==== Early appearances (2017–2018) ====
Before being officially signed to Impact Wrestling, Miguel competed in a few tryout matches. The first being on the August 20, 2017, episode of Impact!, teaming with Jon Bolen where they lost to Ohio Versus Everything (Jake and Dave Crist). The latter being Miguel's trainer and the guy who helped break him into the company. On the September 6, 2018 episode of Impact!, Miguel made his second appearance by teaming with Zachary Wentz and Ace Austin as enhancement talents again against Ohio Versus Everything (Dave Crist, Jake Crist, and Sami Callihan) in a losing effort.

==== The Rascalz (2018–2020) ====
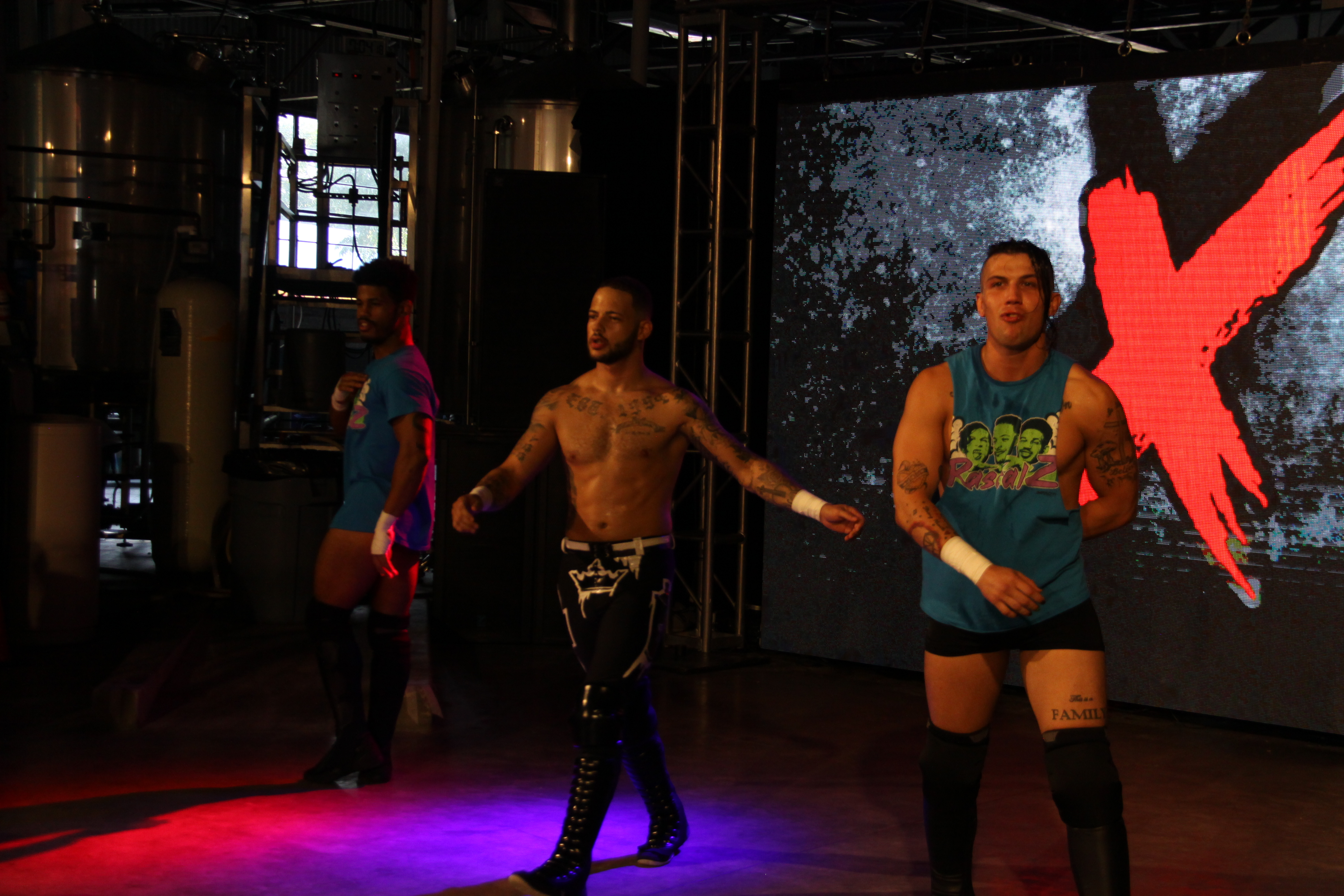
Trey (center) with Dez (left) and Wentz (right) as The Rascalz in July 2019

A vignette aired promoting the debut of The Rascalz on the November 15 episode of Impact!. On the November 29 episode of Impact!, Miguel made his official debut alongside Dezmond Xavier and Zachary Wentz as the trio known as The Rascalz, accompanying them ringside when Xavier and Wentz competed in a tag team match against Chris Bey and Mike Sydal. In mid-2019, Trey and the Rascalz began a feud against Moose, which led to all The Rascalz making their pay-per-view debut against Moose and The North (Ethan Page and Josh Alexander) in a six-man tag team match at Rebellion, which Rascalz lost. During the match, the ring names of Xavier, Miguel and Wentz were shortened to Dez, Trey and Wentz respectively.

On the November 13, 2019, episode of Impact, Trey became the number one contender for the X Division Championship by pinning Petey Williams in a six-way match, but failed to win the title from Ace Austin at Hard to Kill. At Slammiversary, Trey received his first shot at the vacant Impact World Championship in a five-way elimination match against Ace Austin, Eddie Edwards, Rich Swann, and the returning Eric Young, but was eliminated first by Young. On November 11, it was revealed that The Rascalz would soon be leaving Impact and had interest from both WWE and All Elite Wrestling. During the November 17 tapings, The Rascalz were given a "send-off" by the Impact locker room. Trey confirmed the following day that he, Dez and Wentz were in fact done appearing on Impact Wrestling. Dez and Wentz went on to sign with WWE while Trey remained a free agent.

==== X Division Champion (2021–2023) ====
Trey made a surprise return to Impact on the January 26, 2021, episode of Impact, teaming with Tommy Dreamer, Rich Swann, and Willie Mack to defeat Chris Bey, Moose, Ken Shamrock, and Sami Callihan. During his return match, his ring name was reverted to Trey Miguel. Shortly after his return, Miguel began a heated high level feud with Callihan based on Callihan's theory that Miguel couldn't survive without Dez and Wentz. Throughout the deeply personal feud, Miguel would get tormented by Callihan in many ways including being forced to watch his trainee Sam Beale get beat down and be constantly told he "lost his passion". After weeks of back and forth attacks and mind games, the feud culminated in a last man standing match at Rebellion, which Miguel won.

In September, Miguel entered a tournament to determine a new X Division Champion, where he defeated Alex Zayne and Laredo Kid in the first round. At Bound for Glory, Miguel defeated El Phantasmo and Steve Maclin in the final to win the Impact X Division Championship. On the October 28 episode of Impact!, Miguel made his first successful title defense against New Japan Pro-Wrestling (NJPW) talent Rocky Romero. Miguel then retained his title against Laredo Kid and Steve Maclin at Turning Point, against Maclin at Hard To Kill, and against Jake Something at Sacrifice. On April 1, 2022, at Multiverse of Matches, Miguel successfully defended his X Division Championship against Blake Christian, Chris Bey, Jordynne Grace, Rich Swann, and Vincent in an Intergender Ultimate X match. At Rebellion, he lost the title to Ace Austin in a three-way match involving Mike Bailey, ending his reign at 182 days. Two weeks later, he failed to regain the title in a rematch at Under Siege.

On the May 12 episode of Impact!, Miguel competed in a Gauntlet for the Gold to determine the number one contender to Josh Alexander's Impact World Championship at Slammiversary, but was eliminated by Steve Maclin. On the May 26 episode of Impact!, Miguel defeated Alex Shelley to qualify for the Ultimate X match for the X Division Championship at Slammiversary. At the event, he failed to capture the title that was won by Mike Bailey. On the June 30 episode of Impact!, Miguel won a four-way match to get a shot at the X Division title. A day later, at Against All Odds, he failed to beat Bailey for the title.

On September 23, at Victory Road, Miguel competed in an Intergender Triple Threat Revolver to determine the number one contender for the X Division Championship, but was eliminated by eventual winner Frankie Kazarian. He later took part in a tournament to crown a new X Division Champion, defeating Alan Angels in the quarterfinals and Mike Bailey in the semifinals. On November 18, at Over Drive, Miguel defeated Black Taurus in the final by turning heel after blinding him with spray paint, and won the vacant title for a second time. On the December 1 episode of Impact!, Miguel explained what he needed to do to regain the title and sprayed green paint on it. On January 13, 2023, on the Countdown to Hard to Kill pre-show, Miguel defeated Taurus to successfully retain his title. He continued to retain the X Division title on Impact! against Mike Jackson, and against Crazzy Steve in a Monster's Ball match. Miguel followed that with more successful defenses against Lince Dorado at Sacrifice, against Clark Connors, Frankie Kazarian, Kevin Knight, Rich Swann, and Rocky Romero in a six-way scramble match at Multiverse United, against Jonathan Gresham and Mike Bailey in a three-way elimination match at Rebellion and against Chris Sabin at Under Siege. On June 9 at Against All Odds, Miguel lost the X Division Championship to Sabin, ending his reign at 203 days.

==== The Rascalz reunion (2023–2026) ====
On the June 29, 2023, episode of Impact, Miguel had a rematch against Chris Sabin for the X Division Championship which ended in a no-contest when Zachary Wentz made his return and attacked the latter, thus reuniting The Rascalz as heels in the process. On July 23 at Emergence, Miguel and Wentz won the Impact World Tag Team Championship for the first time in their careers by defeating Subculture (Mark Andrews & Flash Morgan Webster). On October 21 at Bound for Glory, Miguel and Wentz lost the Impact World Tag Team Championship to ABC (Ace Austin and Chris Bey), ending their reign at 55 days.

At Genesis on January 19, 2025, Wentz and Miguel failed to defeat TNA World Tag Team Champions The Hardys (Matt Hardy and Jeff Hardy) for the titles. Later that night, it was announced that Wentz and Miguel will face NXT Tag Team Champions Nathan Frazer and Axiom for the titles (which they were supposed to challenge for in October 2024) on the January 23 episode of Impact!, where they lost after Lee and his new allies Tyriek Igwe and Tyson Dupont interfered in the match. On the January 30 and February 6 episodes of Impact!, Wentz and Miguel ran out to save Ace Austin from Lee, Igwe and Dupont after Austin's matches against Lee and Dupont respectively. Despite their past differences, Austin joined The Rascalz in their feud against Lee. At Sacrifice on March 14, The Rascalz and Austin defeated Lee, Igwe and Dupont in a "Lucha Rules" six-man tag team match to end the feud. In July, TNA announced that Miguel was sidelined due to a hernia injury with no timeline for his return. On the September 12 episode of Impact!, Reed returned from injury and faced Wentz, Reed, and Jake Something in a four-way match won by Reed for a TNA X Division Championship at Victory Road. At Turning Point on November 14, The Rascalz reunited with the now reverted Dezmond Xavier to defeat The System (Brian Myers, Eddie Edwards, JDC, and Moose) in an eight-man tag team match.

On January 13, 2026, it was reported that all four members of The Rascalz's contracts had expired and TNA elected not to opt-in, making them free agents. On January 14, 2026, it was reported that The Rascalz had signed with All Elite Wrestling (AEW). However, four days later, Miguel was released from AEW due to the resurfacing of antisemitic remarks he had made on Twitter in 2019 and homophobic remarks he had made on Facebook in 2020. He apologized for his comments and announced that he would be taking a hiatus from wrestling. Miguel later revealed that he considered quitting professional wrestling before TNA reached out to bring him back to the company.

==== Singles competition (2026–present) ====
On the January 22, 2026 episode of Impact!, Miguel returned to TNA as a participant in the Feast or Fired match, where he secured one of the four briefcases. It was also announced that Miguel had re-signed with TNA. The following week on Impact!, the briefcases were opened, and it was revealed that Miguel's contained the contract for a title shot at the TNA International Championship. Miguel would go to win the title from Channing "Stacks" Lorenzo at No Surrender on February 13. At Rebellion, Miguel lost the title to Mustafa Ali, ending his reign at 57 days and two weeks later, Miguel announced that he had suffered a broken patella. At Lockdown, Miguel defeated Special Agent 0. At Bound for Glory, Miguel competed in the 21-person Call Your Shot Gauntlet where he made it the final two before being eliminated by Frankie Kazarian.

=== WWE (2024–2025) ===
Due to TNA's working relationship with WWE, Miguel made several appearances for their developmental brand NXT in 2024 and 2025. Miguel and his Rascalz stablemate Zachary Wentz notably reunited with Wes Lee (formerly Dezmond Xavier), but the reunion abrupdtly ended after Lee turned on the Rascalz after losing an NXT Tag Team Championship match with Wentz. At NXT No Mercy on September 1, Miguel assisted Wentz defeat Lee. Two days later on NXT, Miguel and Wentz won a triple threat tag team match for to earn an NXT Tag Team Championship match. However, Miguel and Wentz failed to appear for the title match after Lee had taken out Miguel offscreen. In reality, it was reported that Miguel had to undergo an unexpected minor surgery.

== Championships and accomplishments ==
- Alpha-1 Wrestling
  - A1 Zero Gravity Championship (1 time)
- DEFY Wrestling
  - DEFY Lucha International Championship (1 time, current)
- Destiny Wrestling
  - Destiny Next Generation Championship (1 time)
- Extreme Chaos Wrestling
  - Extreme Championship (1 time)
- Gleat
  - G-Infinity Championship (1 time) – with Zachary Wentz
- Horror Slam Wrestling
  - Horror Slam Heavyweight Championship (1 time)
- Independent Wrestling Association Mid-South
  - IWA Mid-South Tag Team Championship (1 time) – with Myron Reed
- Insane Wrestling Revolution
  - IWR United States Championship (1 time)
- Mega Championship Wrestling
  - MEGA Championship (1 time)
  - Mega Title Tournament (2021)
- Pro Wrestling Illustrated
  - Ranked No. 92 of the top 500 singles wrestlers in the PWI 500 in 2026
- The Wrestling Revolver
  - Revolver World Championship (1 time)
  - Revolver Remix Championship (1 time)
  - Revolver 24/7 Scramble Championship (1 time)
  - Revolver World Tag Team Championship (4 times, current) – with Zachary Wentz (3), Myron Reed (1), Dezmond Xavier (1), Jake Crist and Rich Swann (1, current)
  - Jerry Lynn Invitational Tournament (2026)
- Total Nonstop Action Wrestling
  - TNA X Division Championship (2 times)
  - TNA International Championship (1 time)
  - TNA World Tag Team Championship (1 time) – with Zachary Wentz
  - Feast or Fired (2026 – International Championship contract)
  - Impact X Division Championship Tournament (2021, 2022)
  - Impact Year End Awards (1 time)
    - Match of the Year (2020) – vs. Ace Austin vs. Eddie Edwards vs. Eric Young vs. Rich Swann at Slammiversary
  - Impact World Tag Team Championship #1 Contendership Tournament (2023) – with Zachary Wentz
- Warrior Wrestling
  - Warrior Wrestling Championship (1 time)
- WrestleCircus
  - WC Big Top Tag Team Championship (1 time, final) – with Zachary Wentz
- Xtreme Intense Championship Wrestling
  - XICW Tag Team Championship (1 time) – with Aaron Williams, Dave Crist, Kyle Maverick, Dezmond Xavier, and Zachary Wentz
