= Ace Austin =

American wrestler (born 1997)

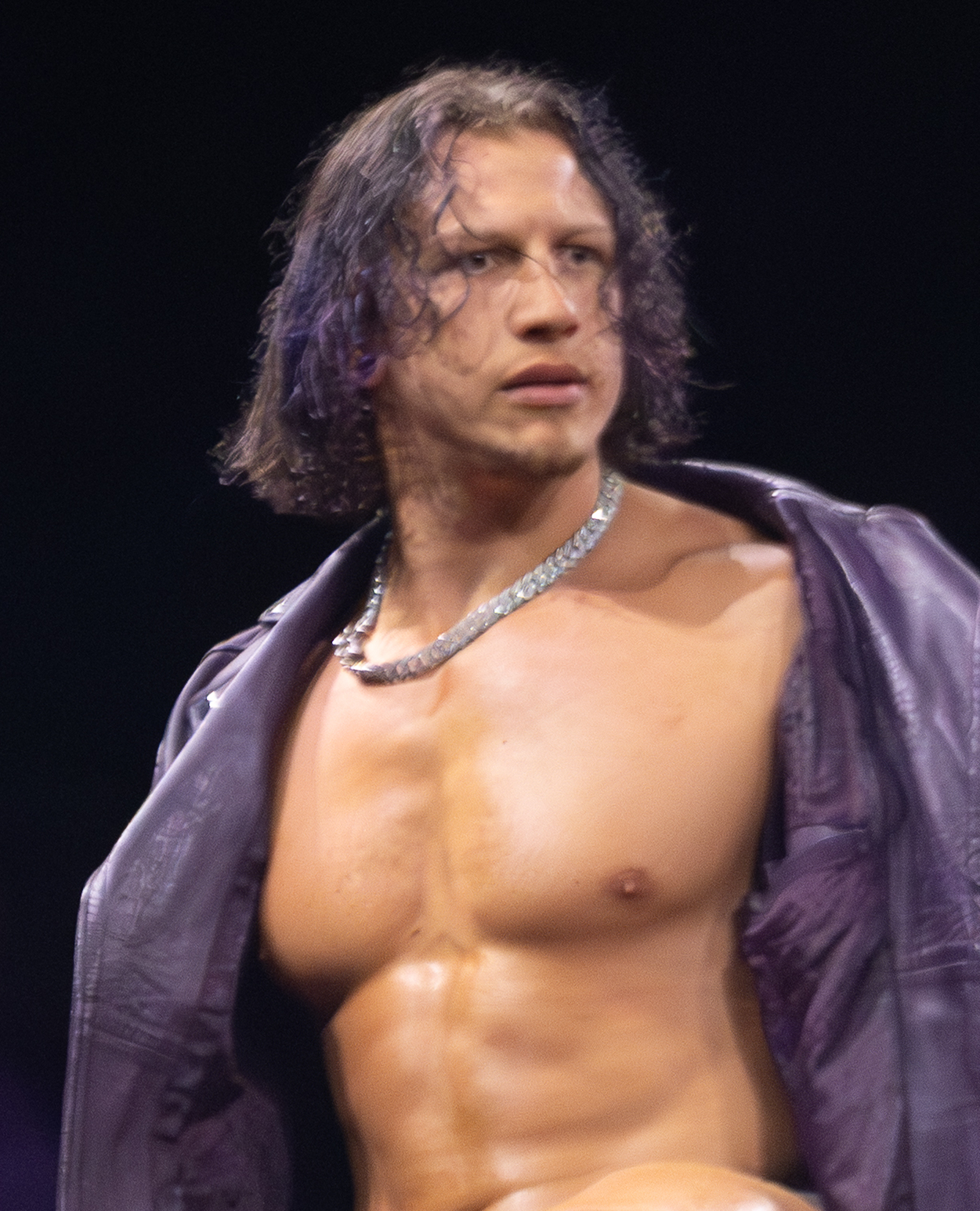
- Austin in 2026

Personal information
- Born: Austin James Highley; February 28, 1997 (age 29) Reading, Pennsylvania, U.S.

Professional wrestling career
- Ring name(s): Ace Austin; Ryan DePolo; RIP Rayzor
- Billed height: 5 ft 10 in (178 cm)
- Billed weight: 210 lb (95 kg)
- Billed from: Atlantic City, New Jersey
- Trained by: Afa Anoa'i; CZW Academy; Dave Christ; D.J. Hyde; Jake Christ; Sami Callihan; Sika Anoa'i; Wild Samoan Pro-Wrestling Training Center
- Debut: April 4, 2015

Austin James Highley (born February 28, 1997), better known by the ring name Ace Austin, is an American professional wrestler. He is signed to All Elite Wrestling (AEW), where he is a member of The Cut stable. He also makes appearances for their sister promotion Ring of Honor (ROH). He is best known for his time in Total Nonstop Action Wrestling (TNA).

He began his career in Combat Zone Wrestling after graduating from the "Wild Samoan Pro-Wrestling Training Center" wrestling school and has also competed for various promotions throughout the United States and Mexico including Major League Wrestling, Tommy Dreamer's House of Hardcore, Florida-based World Xtreme Wrestling, and Mexico's Lucha Libre AAA Worldwide (AAA). He then signed with Impact Wrestling or Total Nonstop Action Wrestling (TNA) in 2019, where he would go on to become a three-time TNA X Division Champion and a three-time TNA World Tag Team Champion with Chris Bey as ABC. Through TNA's working relationship, he worked in New Japan Pro-Wrestling (NJPW), where he joined Bullet Club. He departed TNA in May 2025. He signed with AEW that August.

== Professional wrestling career ==
=== Early career (2015–2019) ===
Austin began his career in Combat Zone Wrestling (CZW) after graduating from the "CZW Dojo" wrestling school. He spent his early years also wrestling for the Anoaʻi family's World Xtreme Wrestling promotion.

=== Impact Wrestling / Total Nonstop Action Wrestling (2019–2025) ===
==== X Division Champion (2019–2020) ====
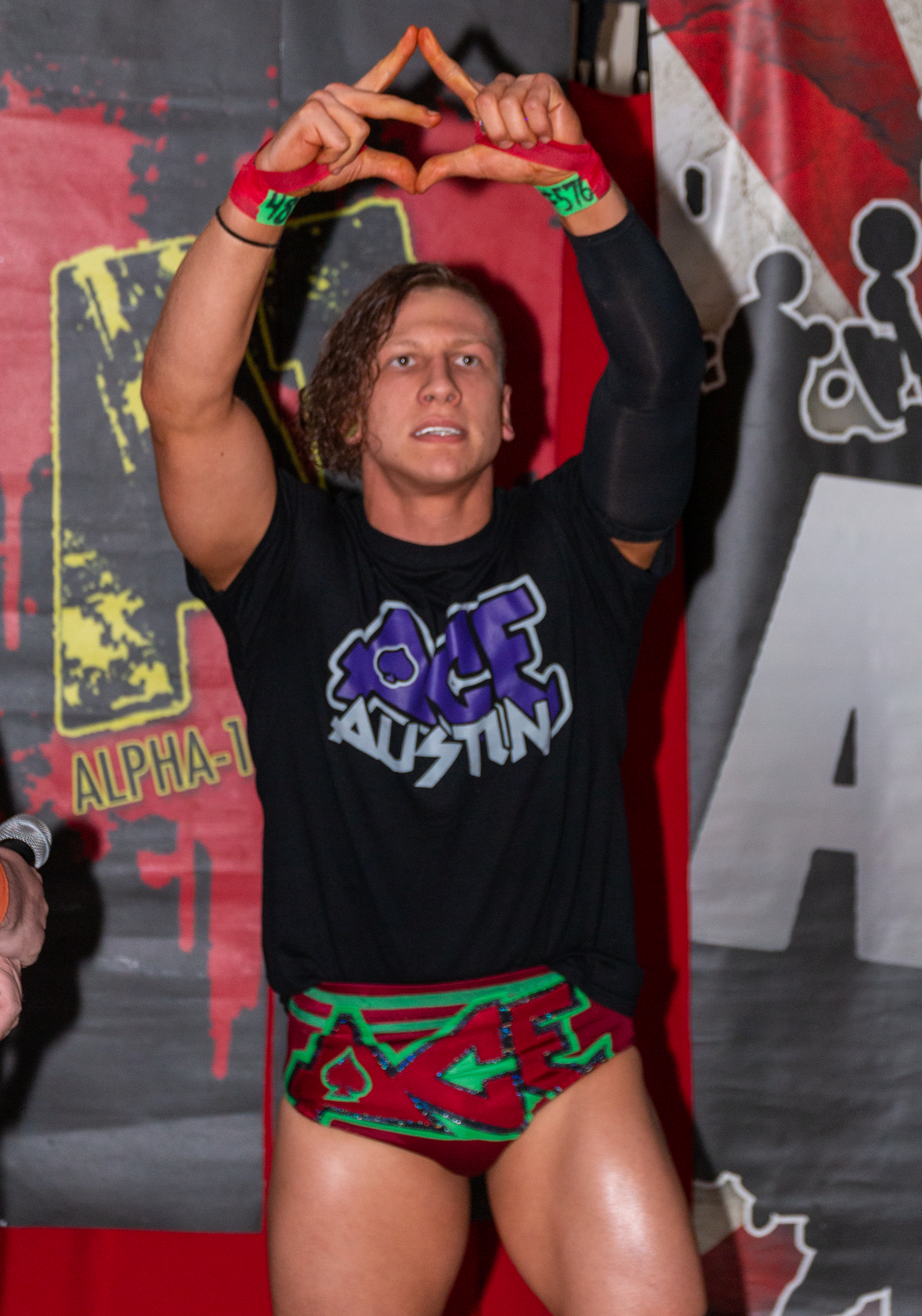
Austin in 2019

In early 2019, vignettes began airing to promote Ace Austin's debut in Impact Wrestling. On the March 8 episode of Impact!, Austin made his debut in Impact by defeating Jake Atlas. It was then revealed that Austin had signed with the company. Eventually over the next couple of weeks, Austin would remain undefeated against Damian Hyde and Aiden Prince before making his pay-per-view debut at the United We Stand event, where he participated in an Ultimate X match to determine the #1 contender for the X Division Championship. Johnny Impact won the match. Austin continued his winning streak by defeating Aiden Prince, Eddie Edwards, Jake Crist, Jake Deaner and Petey Williams in a six-way match at Rebellion. Austin would then engage in a brief feud with Williams, which led to a match between the two on the May 3 episode of Impact!, which Austin won. Austin's winning streak ended on the June 21 episode of Impact!, when he lost to the returning TJP. Austin received title shots for the X Division Championship at Code Red and Unbreakable, but failed to win on both occasions.

In the summer of 2019, Austin would enter into a feud with Eddie Edwards over his wife, Alisha. Austin defeated Edwards in a match on the October 11 episode of Impact! to qualify for a five-way ladder match for the X Division Championship at Bound for Glory, which he won by defeating Tessa Blanchard, Daga, Jake Crist and Acey Romero. Austin continued his feud with Edwards, losing to him in a street fight at Prelude to Glory but won a street fight rematch on the October 29 episode of Impact!. Their feud concluded with a tables match between the pair at No Surrender, which Edwards won. Austin continued to successfully defend the X Division Championship against former champion Jake Crist at Turning Point, Dez at Motown Showdown and Trey at Hard to Kill.

Austin began feuding with the Impact World Champion Tessa Blanchard in early 2020, stemming from the fact that Austin had beaten her in a ladder match to win the X Division Championship at Bound for Glory. The feud between the two led to a champion vs. champion match between the pair at Sacrifice, which Blanchard won. This win earned Blanchard a title shot against Austin for the X Division Championship on the February 25 episode of Impact!. Austin retained the title by getting disqualified after Taya Valkyrie attacked Blanchard. Austin lost the title to Willie Mack at Rebellion Night 1. He received a rematch for the title against Mack in a three-way match, also involving Chris Bey, on the May 5 episode of Impact!, where Mack retained the title.

==== Alliance with Madman Fulton (2020–2022) ====
After losing the X Division Championship, Austin participated in a tournament to determine the #1 contender for the Impact World Championship. He defeated Rhino, Hernandez and Wentz to win the tournament but didn't win the title. In 2020, he began an alliance with Madman Fulton to capture the Impact World Championship. At Slammiversary, he lost a five-way elimination match for the vacant title in a match that also involved Trey, Rich Swann, Eric Young and Eddie Edwards who was the eventual winner. At Bound for Glory, Austin and Fulton participated in a match for the Impact Tag Team Championship, but were defeated by The North. Austin was inactive for weeks since Impact didn't have plans for him, but he returned as part of the 2021 Super X Cup at Genesis. At the event, he defeated Suicide in the first round, Cousin Jake in the semifinals, and Blake Christian in the finals to win the tournament. At Hard to Kill, Austin issued an open-challenge, who was answered by Matt Cardona. Austin lost the match by disqualification. At No Surrender, Austin participated in the Triple Threat Revolver to determine the number one contender for the X Division Championship, but the match was won by Josh Alexander.

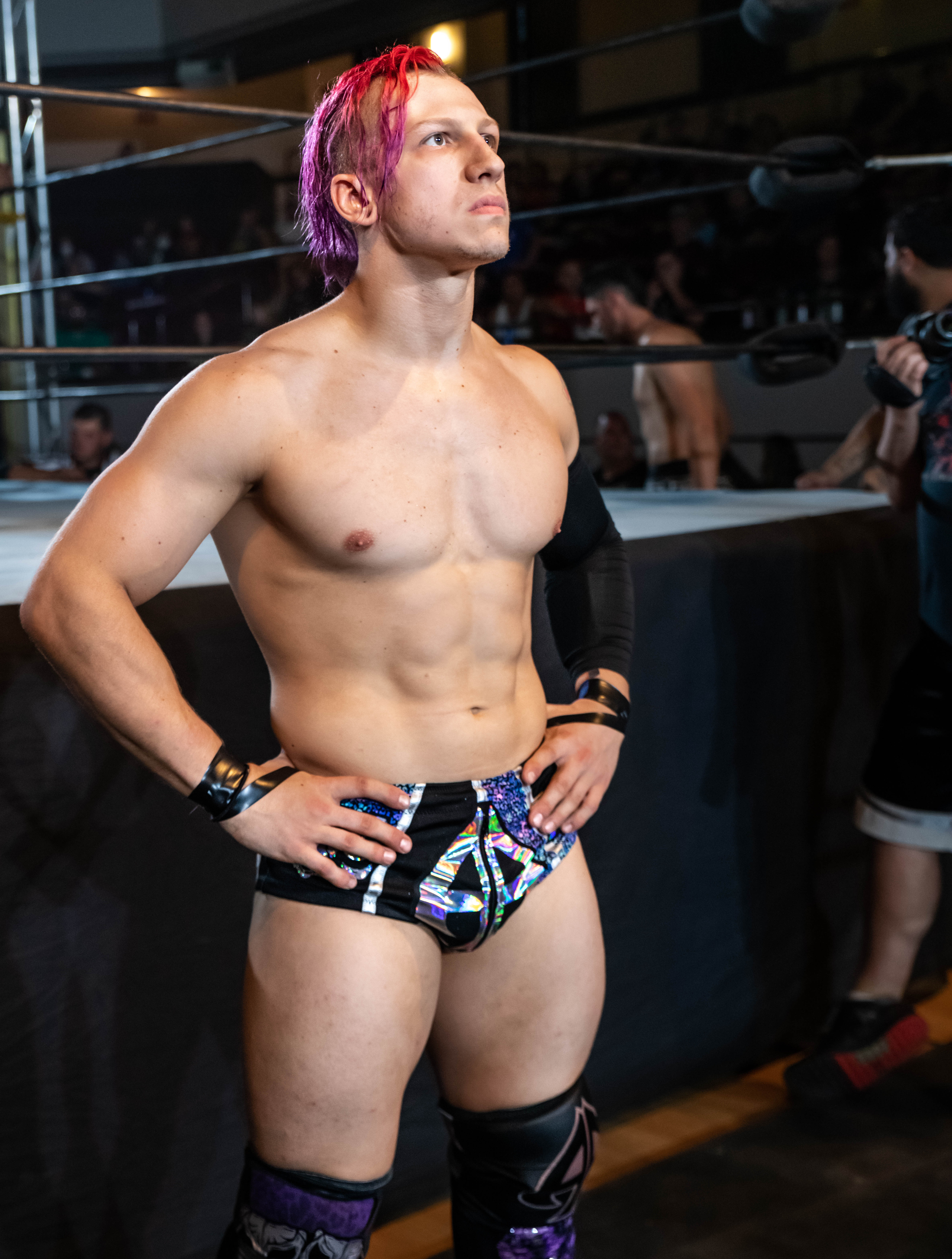
Austin in December 2021

On the March 2 episode of Impact!, Austin defeated Black Taurus and Chris Bey to become the number one contender for the X Division Championship at Sacrifice. At the event, Austin defeated TJP and won the title for the second time of his career. He successfully retained his title against TJP on the March 23 episode of Impact!, losing by disqualification, but lost the title to Josh Alexander at Rebellion, in a match who also included TJP, ending his reign at 43 days. He failed to regain the title against Alexander on the April 29 episode of Impact!. At Under Siege, Austin and Fulton defeated Petey Williams and TJP, XXXL (Acey Romero and Larry D) and Rohit Raju and Shera to become the new number one contenders for the Impact World Tag Team Championship. On the May 20 Episode of Impact!, Austin and Fulton were defeated by FinJuice (David Finlay and Juice Robinson) and failed to win the titles. On July 17 at Slammiversary, Austin competed in an Ultimate X match for the X Division Championship, but failed to win the title. At Emergence, he defeated Chris Sabin, Moose, and Sami Callihan in a four-way match to become the number one contender to the Impact World Championship. On September 18 at Victory Road, he faced Christian Cage for the title in a losing effort. At Bound for Glory, Austin participated in the Call Your Shot Gauntlet match, which was won by Moose. Austin then started to feud against Chris Sabin, leading to a match at Turning Point, which Austin lost.

On January 8, 2022, at the Countdown to Hard To Kill pre-show, Austin was pinned by the debuting Mike Bailey in a four-way match. During the following weeks, Austin tried to befriend Bailey, eventually teaming with him on several occasions before Bailey turned on Austin after he asked him to attack X Division champion Trey Miguel. At Rebellion, Austin defeated Bailey and Miguel in a three-way match, winning the X Division Championship for the third time of his career. Austin successfully retained his title against Rocky Romero on the May 5 episode of Impact! and against former champion Miguel at Under Siege. On June 19 at Slammiversary, Austin lost the title to Bailey in an Ultimate X match, ending his reign at 57 days.

==== ABC (2023–2024) ====
On February 25, 2023, Ace Austin and Chris Bey, better known as ABC, defeated the Motor City Machine Guns (Alex Shelley and Chris Sabin) to capture the Impact World Tag Team Championships and bringing them back to Bullet Club. On July 15, at Slammiversary, Austin and Bey lost the tag titles to Subculture in a four-way tag team match also involving Rich Swann and Sami Callihan, and Moose and Brian Myers, after The Rascalz (Zachary Wentz and Trey Miguel) interfered in the match. On July 20, during the rematch, The Rascalz once again cost Austin and Bey their rematch against Subculture for the Impact World Tag Team Championships. However, on Impact 1000, Austin and Bey were involved in a Feast or Fired match where Bey secured one of the cases which contained a future Impact World Tag Team Championship title shot. On October 5, it was announced that Bey and Austin would invoke the title shot at Bound for Glory against new Impact World Tag Team Champions The Rascalz, where they won to become two-time Impact Tag Team Champions. On March 8, 2024, at Sacrifice, Austin and Bey lost the tag titles to The System members Brian Myers and Eddie Edwards, ending their reign at 134 days, only to regained them at Slammiversary on July 20. On September 13 at Victory Road, Austin and Bey lost the tag titles back to Myers and Edwards, ending their third reign at 55 days. At Bound for Glory, Austin and Bey competed in a Three-way Full Metal Mayhem match for the TNA World Tag Team Championship which was won by The Hardys.

==== Singles competition and departure (2024–2025) ====
On the October 27 tapings of Impact, Bey suffered a legitimate injury during ABC's match against The Hardys. The match was immediately called off by the referee and Bey was stretchered out and taken to a nearby hospital, where he received surgery. The details of his injury were kept private and a GoFundMe was later set up to help fund his recovery. This injury put the team on an indefinite hiatus and left Austin as a singles wrestler. On January 19, 2025, at Genesis, Austin unsuccessfully challenged Moose for the TNA X Division Championship. On the January 30 and February 6 episodes of Impact!, Austin faced NXT's Wes Lee (former Rascalz member) and Tyson Dupont respectively, losing against the former and winning against the latter. After both matches, Austin was attacked by Lee, Dupont and their teammate Tyriek Igwe and was saved by The Rascalz. Despite their past differences, Austin joined The Rascalz in their feud against Lee. At Sacrifice on March 14, The Rascalz and Austin defeated Lee, Igwe and Dupont in a "Lucha Rules" six-man tag team match to end the feud. On May 22, it was reported by former TNA executive Scott D'Amore that Austin's contract had expired and he would be leaving TNA. On that day's episode of Impact!, Austin wrestled his final TNA match, losing to Mustafa Ali. On May 28, Austin confirmed that he was a free agent, ending his six-year tenure with TNA.

=== New Japan Pro-Wrestling (2022) ===
On May 1, Austin was announced to compete in the 29th annual Best of the Super Juniors event held by New Japan Pro Wrestling, he competed in the A-Block and finished with a record of 5 wins and 4 losses, resulting in a total of 10 points, failing to advance to the finals. On the final day, Austin, Alex Zayne, El Lindaman and Wheeler Yuta defeated Robbie Eagles, Yoh, Clark Connors and Titán. Later, in the night Austin interrupted a tag team match, helping Bad Luck Fale, Chase Owens and El Phantasmo defeat the United Empire's Jeff Cobb, Great-O-Khan and Aaron Henare, and celebrated with them post-match, therefore joining the Bullet Club.

=== All Elite Wrestling (2025–present) ===
==== Bang Bang Gang (2025–2026) ====
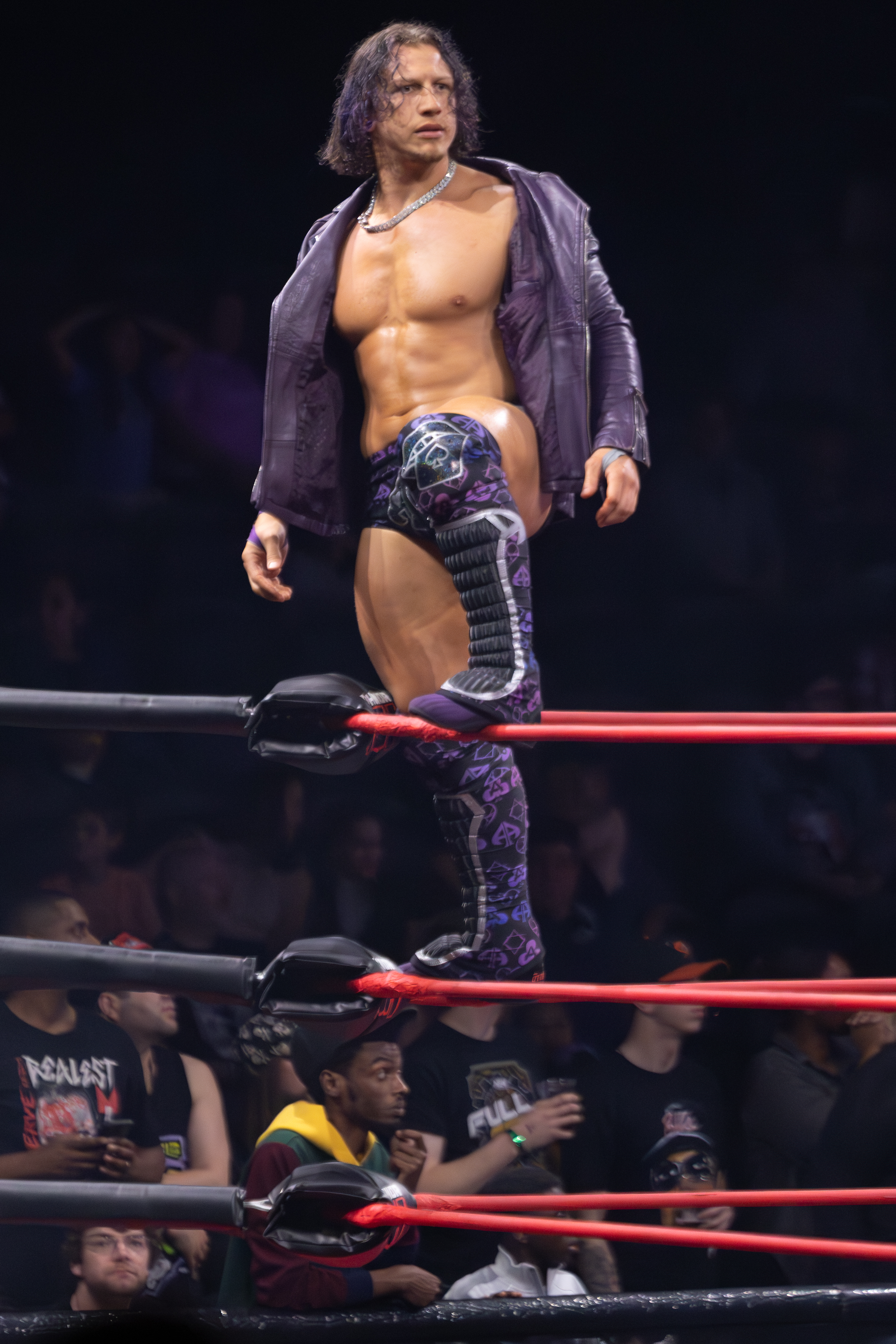
Austin in 2026

Austin made his All Elite Wrestling (AEW) debut on the August 16, 2025, episode of Collision, where he was defeated by Ricochet. After the match, AEW president Tony Khan confirmed that Austin had signed with the promotion. On the September 27 episode of Collision, Austin joined the Bang Bang Gang. On the October 25 episode of Collision, Austin picked up his first win in AEW, defeating Bryan Keith. Over the following months, Austin would challenge for the AEW National Championship and AEW TNT Championship, as well as making appearances in AEW's sister promotion Ring of Honor (ROH), where challenged for the ROH Pure Championship.

==== The Cut (2026–present) ====
On the October 21, 2026 episode of Dynamite, the Bang Bang Gang turned heel after aligning with The Dogs to attack the Death Riders and the Conglomeration. After initially naming the alliance The Last Outfit on the October 24 episode of Collision, stable leader Jay White announced that the group would instead be known as The Cut. At Full Gear on November 14, Austin and his stablemates defeated the Death Riders and the Conglomeration in Anarchy in the Arena.

== Championships and accomplishments ==
- AAW Wrestling
  - AAW Heritage Championship (2 times)
  - AAW Tag Team Championship (1 time) – with Madman Fulton
- Combat Zone Wrestling
  - CZW Wired Championship (1 time)
- Desastre Total Ultraviolento
  - DTU Alto Impacto Championship (1 time)
- Future Stars of Wrestling
  - FSW Tag Team Championship (1 time) – with Chris Bey
- Insane Wrestling Revolution
  - IWR United States Championship (1 time)
- Total Nonstop Action Wrestling
  - TNA X Division Championship (3 times)
  - TNA World Tag Team Championship (3 times) – with Chris Bey
  - Super X Cup (2021)
  - Impact World Championship #1 Contender's Tournament (2020)
  - TNA/Impact Year End Awards (4 times)
    - X Division Star of the Year (2020)
    - Match of the Year (2020) vs. Eddie Edwards vs. Trey vs. Eric Young vs. Rich Swann at Slammiversary
    - Male Tag Team of the Year (2023, 2024) with Chris Bey
- Tri States Wrestling
  - TSW Heavyweight Championship (1 time)
- Pro Wrestling Illustrated
  - Ranked No. 33 of the top 500 singles wrestlers in the PWI 500 in 2022
- The Wrestling Revolver
  - Revolver World Championship (1 time)
  - Revolver Remix Championship (1 time)
  - Open Invite Scramble Championship (1 time)
  - Revolver World Tag Team Championship (2 times) – with Chris Bey
- World Xtreme Wrestling
  - WXW Ultimate Hybrid Championship (1 time)
- Xtreme World Wrestling
  - XWW Tag Team Championship (1 time) – with Madman Fulton
