= Impact Wrestling Code Red =

Code Red
- Promotional poster featuring various Impact wrestlers
- Promotion(s): Impact Wrestling; House of Glory
- Date: May 5, 2019
- City: New York City, New York
- Venue: NYC Arena

Impact Plus Monthly Specials chronology
← Previous; First	Next → A Night You Can't Mist

Code Red was a professional wrestling event produced by Impact Wrestling, in conjunction with House of Glory, which aired exclusively on Impact Plus. It was the first special for Impact Plus, a streaming service launched as a successor to the Global Wrestling Network. The event took place on May 5, 2019 at the NYC Arena in New York City, New York.

Eight professional wrestling matches were contested at the event featuring wrestlers from Impact Wrestling and HOG. The main event was an oVe Rules match between Sami Callihan and Tommy Dreamer. In other prominent matches on the undercard, Michael Elgin defeated Willie Mack, Anthony Gangone defended the HOG Heavyweight Championship against Ken Broadway and Moose, Rich Swann and Mantequilla defended their Impact X Division Championship and HOG Crown Jewel Championship in a six-way match respectively, Johnny Impact and Taya Valkyrie defeated Alisha and Eddie Edwards in a mixed tag team match and The Latin American Xchange (Santana and Ortiz) defended the Impact World Tag Team Championship against Ohio Versus Everything (Dave Crist and Jake Crist) and The New York Wrecking Krew (Chris Seaton and Smooth Blackmon) in a three-way match.

== Production ==
=== Background ===
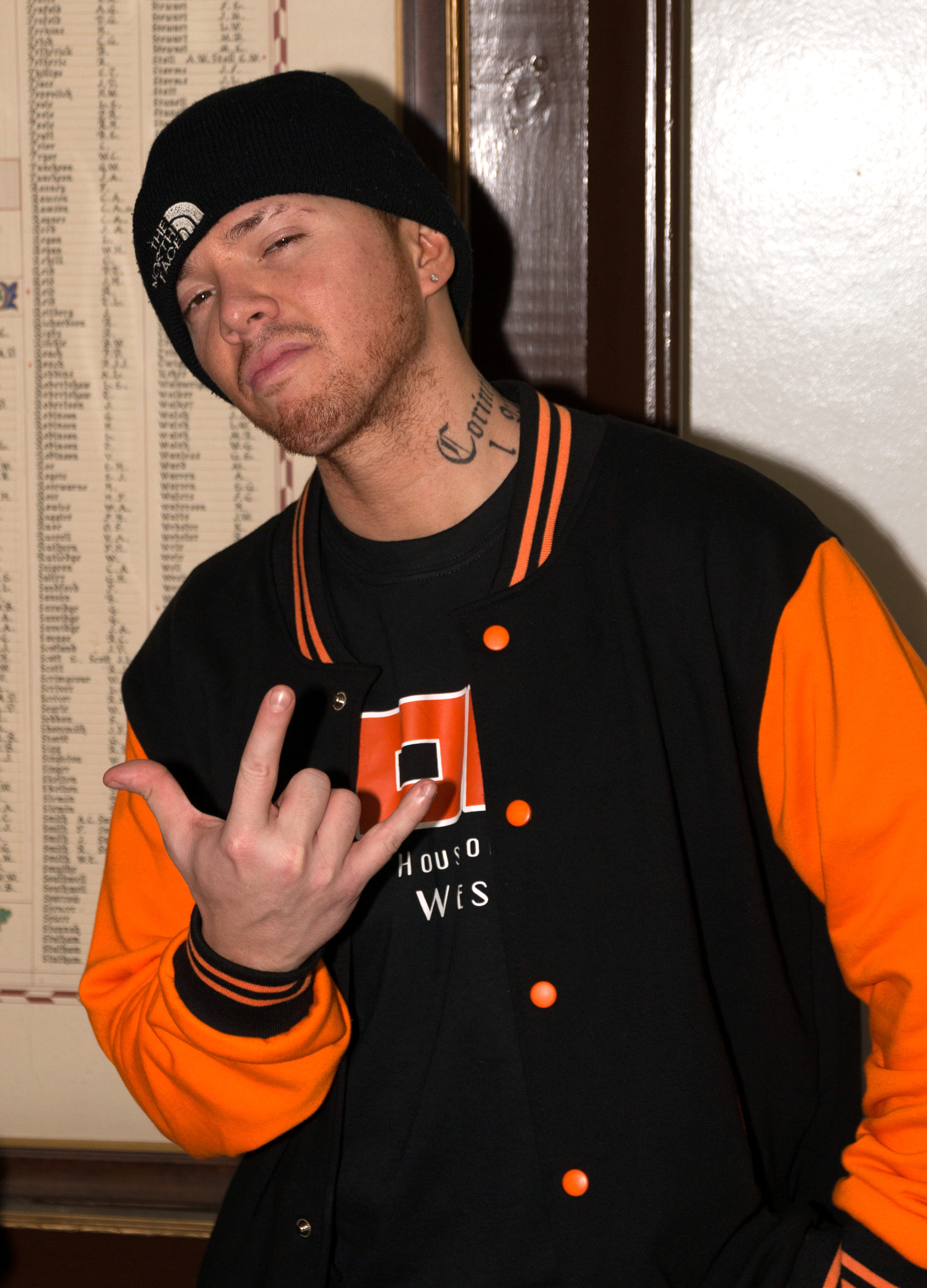
The event was named after Code Red, the finishing move of Amazing Red, the founder of House of Glory, who was supposed to compete at Code Red.

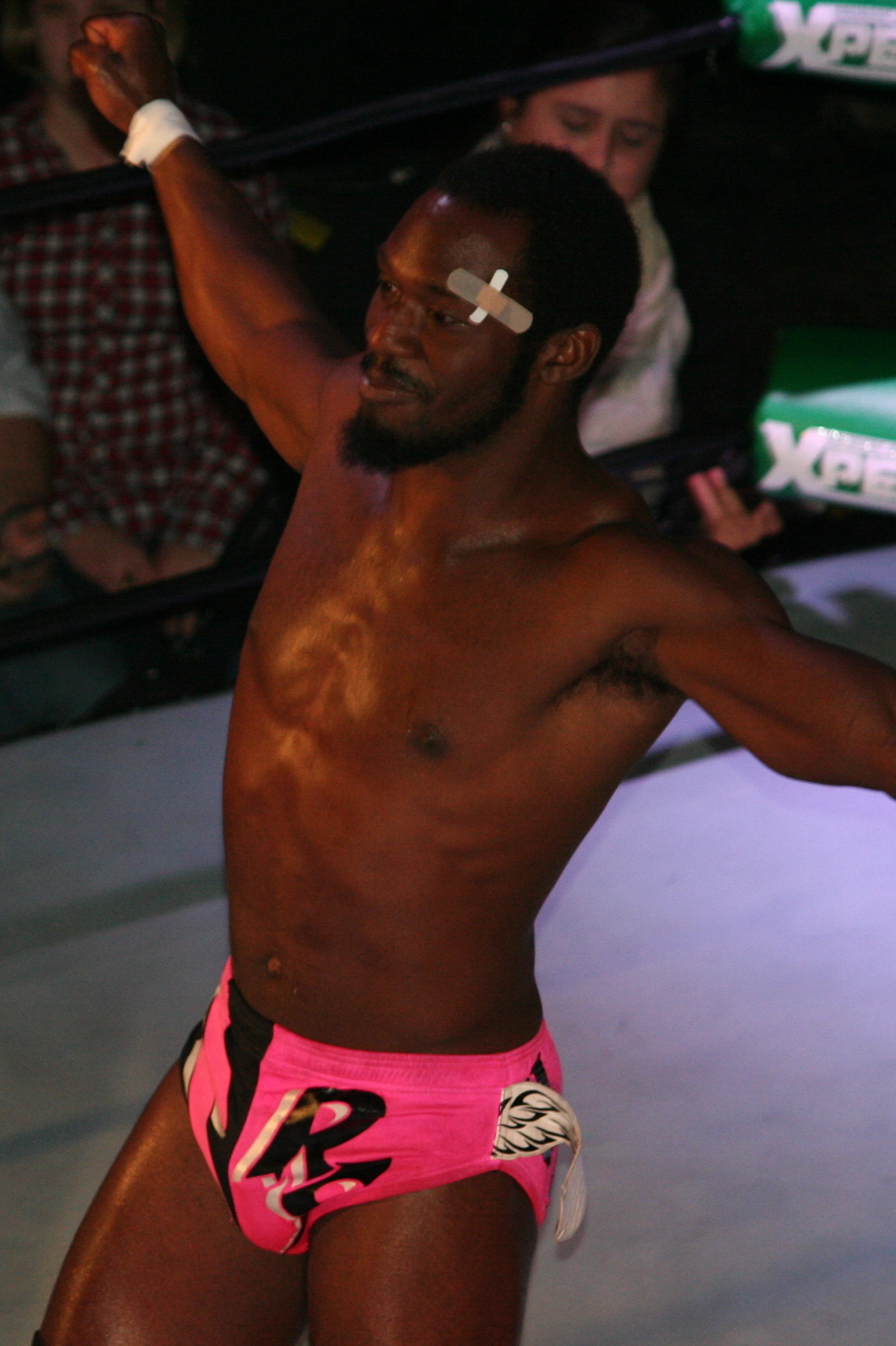
Rich Swann successfully defended the X Division Championship in a six-way scramble at Code Red.

On March 27, 2019, House of Glory announced on its Twitter account that it would hold an event with Impact Wrestling called "Code Red" on May 5 at the NYC Arena. The event's name Code Red was a reference to House of Glory founder and former Impact X Division Champion Amazing Red's finishing move Code Red as Red was supposed to return to Impact Wrestling at United We Stand pay-per-view and win an Ultimate X match to face Rich Swann for the X Division Championship at Code Red, but he was forced to retire due to a severe neck injury and withdrew from the event, thus altering the plans. On May 1, Impact Wrestling replaced its video streaming service Global Wrestling Network with Impact Plus due to a lawsuit by Global Force Wrestling owner Jeff Jarrett. Along with the launch of the streaming service, it was announced that the May 5 event Code Red would be the first original monthly special for Impact Plus.

=== Storylines ===
The main event of Code Red was announced on May 1 as an oVe Rules match between Tommy Dreamer and the oVe leader Sami Callihan.

At Rebellion, Moose and The North defeated The Rascalz in a six-man tag team match. This set up a tag team match between North and the Rascalz members Dez and Wentz at Code Red.

On May 1, it was announced that Eddie Edwards and Alisha Edwards would take on Johnny Impact and Taya Valkyrie in a mixed tag team match at Code Red.

On May 1, a match was announced between Michael Elgin and Willie Mack for Code Red.

On May 1, a three-way tag team match was made between The Latin American Xchange, Ohio Versus Everything (Dave Crist and Jake Crist) and HOG's The New York Wrecking Krew (Chris Seaton and Smoothe Blackmon) at Code Red.

On May 1, it was announced that an interpromotional match would take place between Moose from Impact Wrestling and Ken Broadway from HOG.

After the supposed match between Rich Swann and Amazing Red for the X Division Championship at Code Red was cancelled due to Red's legitimate retirement, it was announced that Swann would defend the X Division Championship against Ace Austin, Trey, Smiley, Evander James and Mantequilla in a six-way Scramble match at Code Red.

On May 1, a knockouts tag team match was made for Code Red pitting Tessa Blanchard and Violette against Scarlett Bordeaux and Sonya Strong at Code Red.

== Event ==
=== Preliminary matches ===
The opening match of the event was a six-way Scramble match, in which Rich Swann defended the Impact X Division Championship and Mantequilla defended the HOG Crown Jewel Championship against Ace Austin, Evander James, Smiley and Trey. The match stipulated that if Swann got pinned or submitted then he would lose the X Division Championship and if Mantequilla got pinned or submitted then he would lose his Crown Jewel Championship. Swann nailed a 450 splash on James for the win to retain the X Division Championship, resulting in Mantequilla retaining the Crown Jewel Championship as he had not been pinned or submitted.

Next, Anthony Gangone defended the HOG World Heavyweight Championship against Ken Broadway and Moose. After initially teasing a No Jackhammer Needed, Moose left the match and walked off, leaving it to Gangone and Broadway. Gangone hit a fireman's carry knee strike for the win to retain the title.

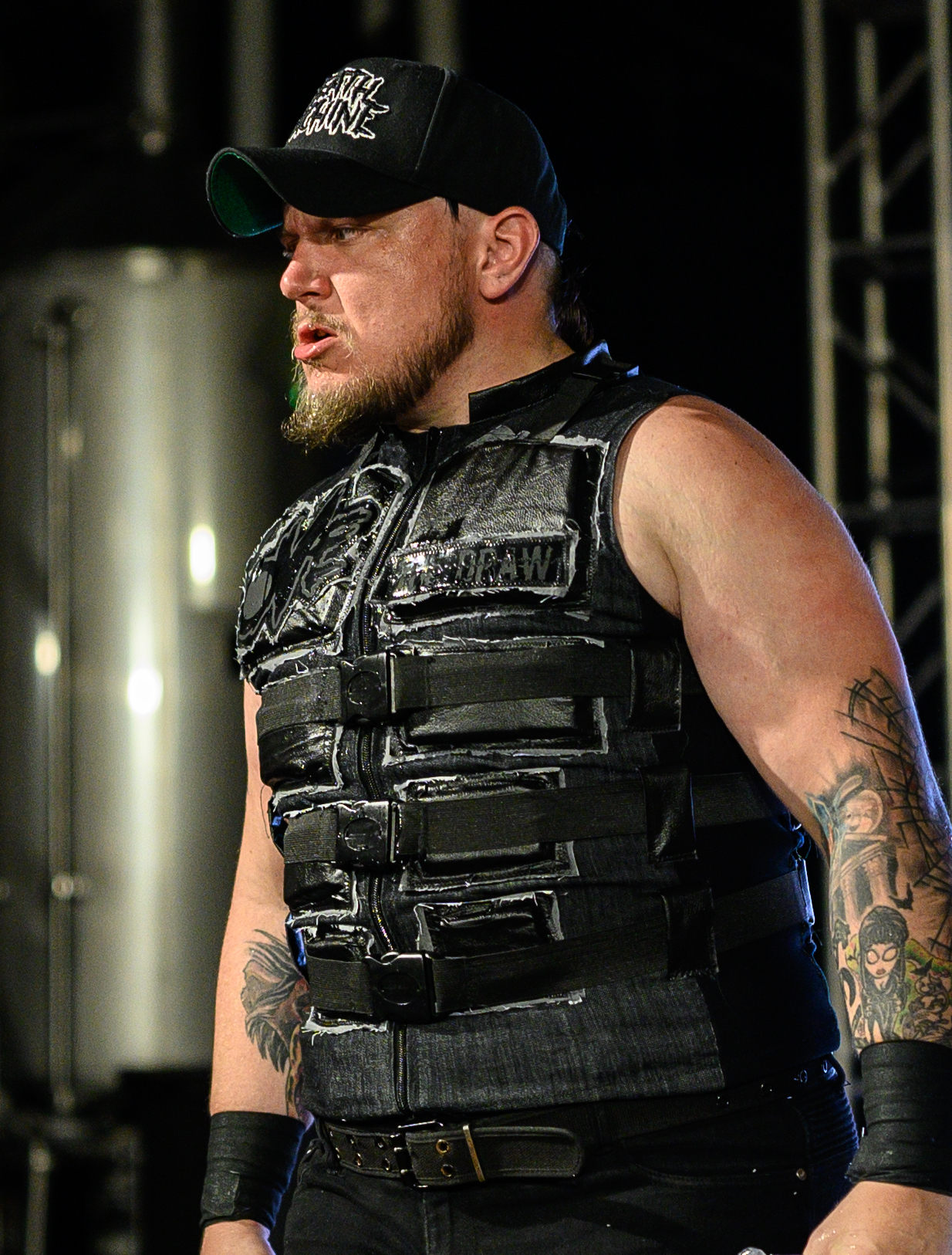
Sami Callihan took on Tommy Dreamer in the main event of Code Red.

Next, The North (Ethan Page and Josh Alexander) took on The Rascalz (Dez and Wentz). An assisted moonsault by Rascalz led to Wentz pinning Alexander but Page pulled out the referee at the two count and then North delivered an aided spinebuster to Wentz for the win.

Next, Scarlett Bordeaux and Sonya Strong took on Tessa Blanchard and Violette. Tessa nailed a Magnum and a hammerlock DDT on Strong for the win.

Next, Willie Mack took on Michael Elgin. Elgin nailed a turnbuckle powerbomb and an Elgin Bomb on Mack for the win.

Later, Alisha and Eddie Edwards took on Johnny Impact and Taya Valkyrie in a mixed tag team match. Alisha covered Impact for the pinfall after a tornado DDT but John E. Bravo distracted the referee, allowing Valkyrie to hit Alisha with a red X and Impact pinned her for the win.

In the penultimate match, The Latin American Xchange (Santana and Ortiz) defended the World Tag Team Championship against Ohio Versus Everything (Dave Crist and Jake Crist) and The New York Wrecking Krew (Chris Seaton and Smooth Blackmon) in a three-way match. LAX beat Jake after double teaming him to retain the titles.

=== Main event match ===
The main event was an oVe rules match between Tommy Dreamer and Sami Callihan. After a back and forth match, Callihan hit Dreamer with a bat and nailed a Cactus Special for the win.

== Reception ==
Code Red received mostly negative reviews from critics. Larry Csonka of 411Mania rated the event 5.6, considering it "an overall lackluster show, lacking in consistency" and featured overall bad wrestling. He further added that "The positive was that the Impact Plus stream worked just about perfectly."

== Aftermath ==
Santana tore his MCL during the World Tag Team Championship match at Code Red and he took some time off to recover from his injury. He recovered from his injury and was cleared to wrestle by May 23.

The rivalry between Callihan and Dreamer continued on the May 10 episode of Impact Wrestling, where oVe defeated Dreamer, Rich Swann, Willie Mack and Fallah Bahh in a street fight.

== Results ==
No.	Results	Stipulations	Times
1	Rich Swann defeated Ace Austin, Evander James (with Matthew Ryan Shapiro), Mantequilla, Smiley, and Trey	6-way Scramble match If Rich Swann had been pinned or submitted, he would have lost his Impact X Division Championship; If Mantequilla had been pinned or submitted, he would have lost his HOG Crown Jewel Championship	10:30
2	Anthony Gangone (c) defeated Ken Broadway and Moose	Three-way match for the HOG Heavyweight Championship	09:04
3	The North (Ethan Page and Josh Alexander) defeated The Rascalz (Dez and Wentz)	Tag team match	09:27
4	Tessa Blanchard and Violette defeated Scarlett Bordeaux and Sonya Strong	Tag team match	12:00
5	Michael Elgin defeated Willie Mack	Singles match	15:55
6	Johnny Impact and Taya Valkyrie (with John E. Bravo) defeated Alisha and Eddie Edwards	Intergender tag team match	12:25
7	The Latin American Xchange (Santana and Ortiz) (c) defeated Ohio Versus Everything (Dave Crist and Jake Crist) and The New York Wrecking Krew (Chris Seaton and Smoothe Blackmon)	Three-way tag team match for the Impact World Tag Team Championship	12:35
8	Sami Callihan defeated Tommy Dreamer	oVe Rules match	14:24
(c) / – the champion(s) heading into the match
