= Impact Wrestling A Night You Can't Mist =

A Night You Can't Mist
- Promotional poster featuring Tommy Dreamer, The Great Muta, Michael Elgin, and Johnny Impact
- Promotion(s): Impact Wrestling; House of Hardcore
- Date: June 8, 2019
- City: Philadelphia, Pennsylvania
- Venue: 2300 Arena

Impact Plus Monthly Specials chronology
← Previous; Code Red	Next → Bash at the Brewery

A Night You Can't Mist was a professional wrestling livestreaming event co-produced by Impact Wrestling and House of Hardcore. It took place on June 8, 2019, at the 2300 Arena in Philadelphia, Pennsylvania and aired live on Impact Plus.

Seven professional wrestling matches were contested at the event. The main event featured the return of The Great Muta to Impact Wrestling since 2015 as he teamed with Tommy Dreamer against Johnny Impact and Michael Elgin in a tag team match, which Muta and Dreamer won. In other prominent matches on the undercard, Eddie Edwards took on Sami Callihan in a South Philly Street Fight, Willie Mack defended the HOH Twitch Television Championship against Rich Swann and Teddy Hart in a three-way match and Taya Valkyrie defended the Impact Knockouts Championship against Jordynne Grace

== Production ==
=== Background ===
On May 3, 2019, just after the launch of the new Impact Plus streaming service, Impact Wrestling announced the second special event for Impact Plus called "A Night You Can't Mist" which would be produced by Impact Wrestling in conjunction with Tommy Dreamer's House of Hardcore promotion and would take place on June 8 at the 2300 Arena in Philadelphia, Pennsylvania. The event was named after the Japanese wrestler The Great Muta, who would be making his return to Impact Wrestling since 2015 and would be the second Impact Plus special after Code Red. The Impact World Champion Brian Cage was also scheduled to make an appearance at the event in a non-wrestling role.

=== Storylines ===
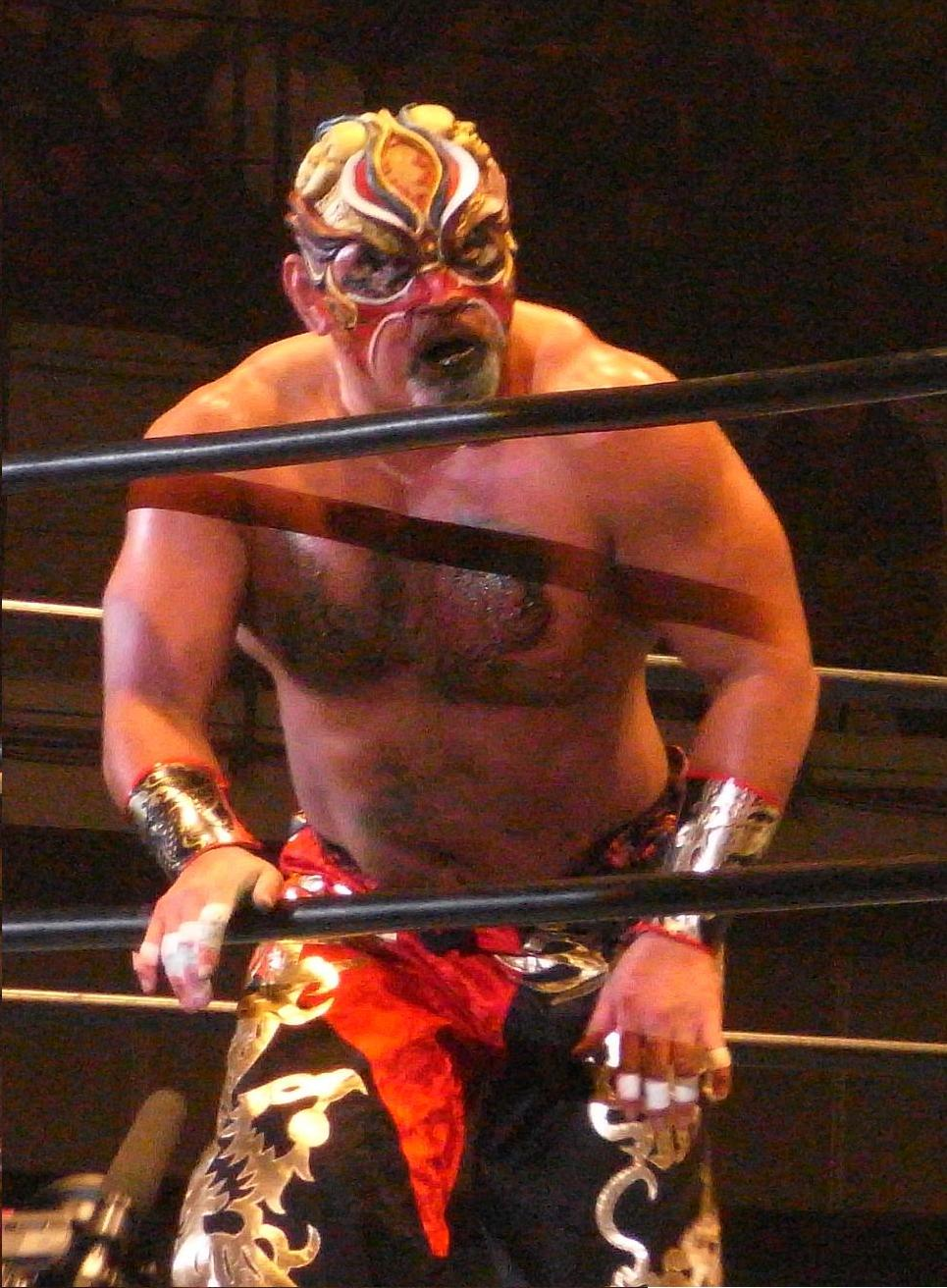
The event was named after and centered around The Great Muta, who made his return to Impact Wrestling by teaming with Tommy Dreamer in the main event.

On May 25, Impact Wrestling announced that the main event of A Night You Can't Mist would be a tag team match pitting The Great Muta and Tommy Dreamer against Johnny Impact and Michael Elgin. Jerry Lynn was announced as the special guest referee.

On May 26, it was announced that Joey Ryan would take on Billy Gunn and the match was billed as "Touch it versus Suck it". This marked Gunn's return to Impact since 2009 as he previously wrestled for the company as Kip James.

At Rebellion, Taya Valkyrie successfully defended the Knockouts Championship against Jordynne Grace. On May 28, it was announced that Valkyrie would defend the title against Grace in a rematch at A Night You Can't Mist.

On May 29, it was announced that Willie Mack would defend the HOH Twitch Television Championship against Rich Swann and Teddy Hart in a three-way match at A Night You Can't Mist.

On May 30, it was announced that Eddie Edwards would face Sami Callihan in a Philly Street Fight at A Night You Can't Mist.

Two matches were added to the event on June 6, with one pitting Moose against Luchasaurus and the second pitting Guido Maritato against Clayton Gainz.

== Event ==
=== Preliminary matches ===
The opening match was the unannounced six-man tag team match between The Rascalz (Dez, Trey and Wentz) and oVe (Dave Crist, Jake Crist and Madman Fulton). Rascalz performed an assisted moonsault on Dave for the win.

Next, Moose took on Luchasaurus. Moose nailed a low blow and a No Jackhammer Needed to Luchasaurus for the win.

Next, Guido Maritato took on Clayton Gainz. Guido nailed a Kiss of Death to Gainz for the win.

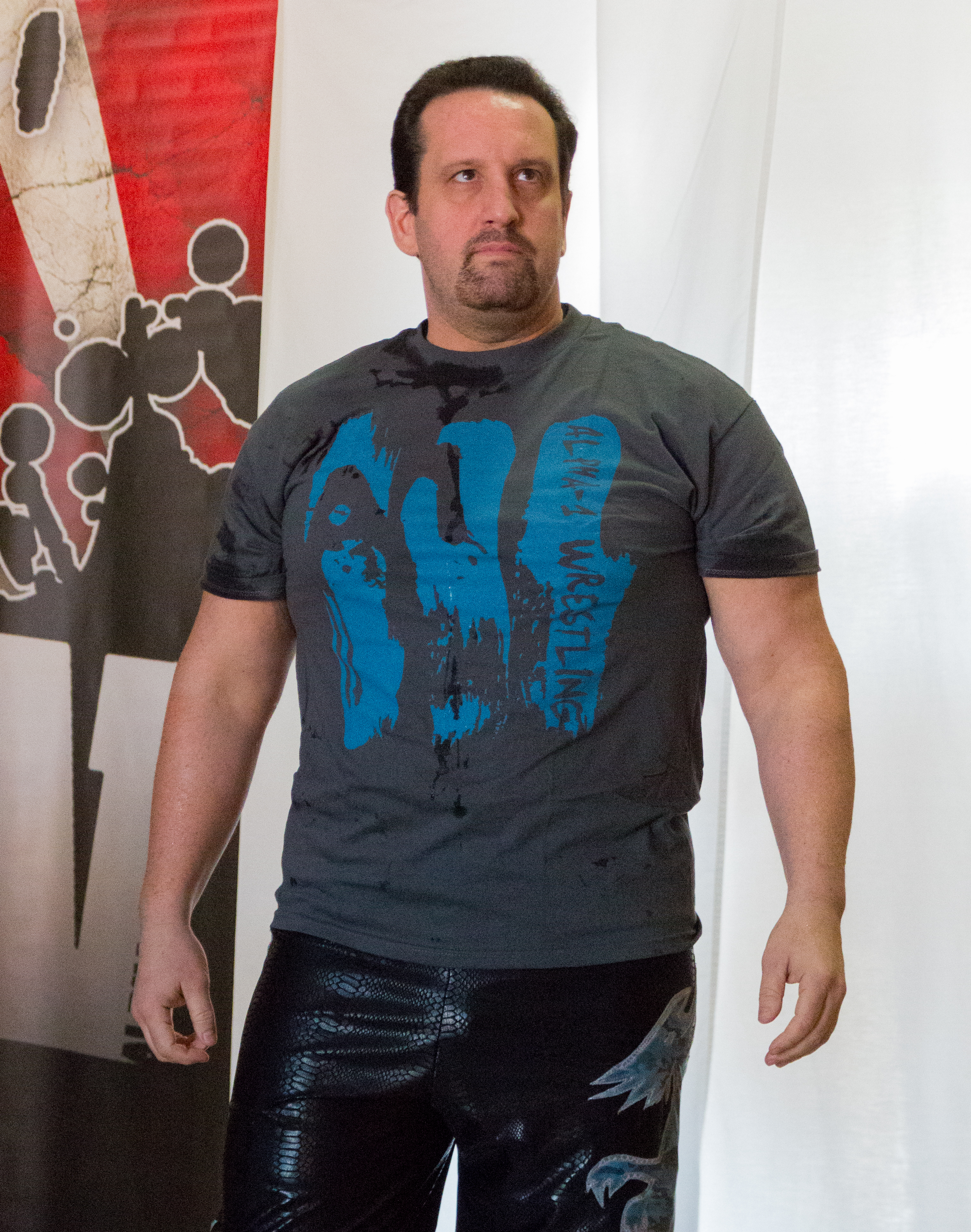
House of Hardcore promoter Tommy Dreamer teamed with The Great Muta in the main event of A Night You Can't Mist.

Next, Taya Valkyrie defended the Impact Knockouts Championship against Jordynne Grace. Near the end of the match, Grace knocked out Valkyrie from the top rope with headbutts, throwing her on the mat and then delivered a corner slingshot suplex and a Grace Driver to Valkyrie to cover her for the pinfall but Valkyrie's manager John E. Bravo interfered by pulling out the referee and hit Grace with a chair, allowing Valkyrie to retain the title.

Later, Willie Mack defended the HOH Twitch Television Championship against Rich Swann and Teddy Hart in a three-way match. Mack delivered a stunner and a frog splash to Hart for the win to retain the title.

The penultimate match of the event was a Street Fight between Eddie Edwards and Sami Callihan. Madman Fulton interfered on Callihan's behalf in the match and attacked Edwards, which led to The Sandman making the save for Edwards. Callihan then pinned Edwards with a cradle for the win.

After the match, Joey Ryan came out to wrestle Billy Gunn for their scheduled match but Gunn was unable to show up due to his legitimate travel issues. He was then replaced by D-Lo Brown, who confronted Ryan, who forced Brown to catch his penis and then flipped him away.

=== Main event match ===
The main event was a tag team match featuring The Great Muta and Tommy Dreamer against Johnny Impact and Michael Elgin. Taya Valkyrie interfered in the match by hitting a low blow to Dreamer, allowing Impact to get his red Ultimate X to use but Muta spit mist on both Impact and Elgin. Dreamer then spit mist on Taya and hit a cutter and then Muta executed a shining wizard to Impact for the win.

== Reception ==
Larry Csonka of 411Mania praised the event, rating it 7.0 and considering it "a good and fun show, with nothing bad, a fun return for Muta, and just a good night of action for 2.5 hours."

== Aftermath ==
Many feuds from A Night You Can't Mist carried onto the following night's Digital Destruction event, a co-promotional special event by Impact and HOH, which aired on Twitch. The feud between The Rascalz and oVe continued as Dez and Wentz defeated Dave Crist and Jake Crist in a tag team match, Rich Swann successfully defended the X Division Championship against Teddy Hart and the team of Tommy Dreamer, Billy Gunn and Jordynne Grace defeated Johnny Impact, Moose and Taya Valkyrie in a six-person tag team match.

== Results ==
No.	Results	Stipulations	Times
1	The Rascalz (Dez, Trey and Wentz) defeated oVe (Dave Crist, Jake Crist and Madman Fulton)	Six-man tag team match	08:01
2	Moose defeated Luchasaurus	Singles match	09:54
3	Guido Maritato defeated Clayton Gainz (with Monet Dupree and Monique Dupree)	Singles match	08:52
4	Taya Valkyrie (c) (with John E. Bravo) defeated Jordynne Grace	Singles match for the Impact Knockouts Championship	11:02
5	Willie Mack (c) defeated Rich Swann and Teddy Hart	Three-way match for the HOH Twitch Television Championship	11:14
6	Sami Callihan defeated Eddie Edwards	South Philly Street Fight	17:11
7	The Great Muta and Tommy Dreamer defeated Johnny Impact and Michael Elgin (with John E. Bravo and Taya Valkyrie)	Tag team match	20:02
(c) / – the champion(s) heading into the match
