= Zachary Wentz =

American professional wrestler (born 1994)

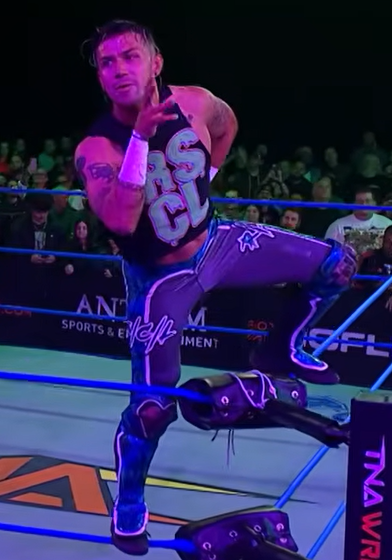
- Wentz in 2025

Personal information
- Born: Zachary Green; April 29, 1994 (age 32) Lima, Ohio, U.S.
- Spouse: Kimber Lee (m. 2020; sep. 2022)
- Life partners: Gigi Dolin (2023–present, engaged)

Professional wrestling career
- Ring name(s): Nash Carter; Suicide; Wentz; Zach Wentz; Zachary Wentz
- Billed height: 5 ft 10 in (178 cm)
- Billed weight: 176 lb (80 kg)
- Trained by: Dave Crist
- Debut: December 17, 2014

Zachary Green (born April 29, 1994), better known by his ring name Zachary Wentz, is an American professional wrestler. He is signed to All Elite Wrestling (AEW), where he is a member of The Rascalz. He also makes appearances for AEW's sister promotion Ring of Honor (ROH) and on the independent circuit. He is best known for his past tenures in Total Nonstop Action Wrestling (TNA) and WWE.

Green began his career in 2014 and worked for several independent promotions. During his early years, he formed The Rascalz stable alongside Dezmond Xavier with Trey Miguel and Myron Reed joining afterwards. Alongside Xavier, he won several tag team titles, like the AAW Tag Team Championship, the CZW World Tag Team Championship and the PWG World Tag Team Championship. He was also a one-time CZW Wired Champion. In 2018, The Rascalz joined Impact Wrestling, where they remained until 2020, when he and Xavier signed with WWE and were assigned to their development brand, NXT. They changed their ring names to Nash Carter and Wes Lee and their tag team was renamed to "MSK". They won the Dusty Rhodes Tag Team Classic in 2021 and won the NXT Tag Team Championship twice. In 2023, Wentz returned to Impact, later winning the Impact World Tag Team Championship alongside Miguel and in 2024, winning the TNA X Division Championship. He departed TNA in 2026 and signed with AEW.

== Professional wrestling career ==
=== Independent circuit (2014–2020) ===
Zachary Green made his professional wrestling debut in 2014 under the ring name Zachary Wentz, the last name being a reference to rock musician Pete Wentz. He teamed up with Dezmond Xavier for the first time at a Rockstar Pro event Amped on December 12, 2015, by defeating Ohio Is 4 Killers (Dave and Jake Crist). They soon formed an alliance with Dave Crist, JT Davidson and Brittany Blake called "Scarlet & Graves" at Combat Zone Wrestling (CZW). On February 13, 2016, at Seventeen, Wentz, Xavier and Crist defeated Conor Claxton, Frankie Pickard and Neiko Sozio. Xavier and Wentz won many tag team titles as part of the stable, including the CZW World Tag Team Championship twice and the All American Wrestling Tag Team Championship once. In CZW, they split up from Crist and Davidson, with whom Xavier and Wentz had begun feuding and continued to compete as Scarlet & Graves. Xavier and Wentz teamed with their future partner Trey Miguel for the first time to defeat Ohio Is 4 Killers (Dave Crist, Jake Crist and Sami Callihan) in a doors match at EVILution on July 8, 2017.

Scarlet & Graves dissolved in 2017 and Xavier and Wentz formed a tag team called The Rascalz in Fight Club Pro by teaming with Meiko Satomura against Travis Banks and Aussie Open (Kyle Fletcher and Mark Davis) in a six-person tag team match at the second day of the Dream Tag Team Invitational tournament on March 31, 2018.

Xavier and Wentz then added Miguel and Myron Reed as the new members of Rascalz in CZW at Welcome to the Combat Zone on April 7, 2018. They defeated Bandido and Flamita and Ohio Versus Everything in a three-way match. At FCP's International Tekkers: Nothing Is True, Everything Is Permitted, Xavier and Wentz captured The Wrestling Revolver's PWR Tag Team Championship by defeating the defending champions Millie McKenzie and Pete Dunne and Besties in the World (Davey Vega and Mat Fitchett) in a three-way match. They successfully defended the titles in a one-night tag team tournament against Killer Death Machines (Jessicka Havok and Nevaeh), The Crew (Jason Cade and Shane Strickland) and The Latin American Exchange (Santana and Ortiz) at Catalina Wrestling Mixer 2. Miguel and Reed also participated in the tournament, losing to Besties in the World in the opening round. Rascalz held the PWR Tag Team Championship until It's Always Sunny In Iowa on March 3, 2019, where they lost the titles to Latin American Exchange in a three-way match, also involving Besties in the World. Reed would leave the group after Miguel, Xavier and Wentz signed with Impact Wrestling.

On May 12, Miguel and Wentz won the WC Big Top Tag Team Championship at WrestleCircus event Encore by defeating The Dirty Devils (Andy Dalton and Isaiah James) and The Riegel Twins (Logan and Sterling) in a three-way match. After a successful title defense against Riegel Twins and Private Party at Big Top Revival, Miguel and Wentz vacated the titles on July 25. In the United Kingdom-based Southside Wrestling Entertainment, Xavier and Wentz captured the SWE Tag Team Championship by defeating Chris Tyler and Stixx at III Manors on August 10. They lost the titles to Deadly Sins at Lock, Stock And Three Smoking Rascalz.

Xavier and Wentz debuted for Pro Wrestling Guerrilla (PWG) at Time is a Flat Circle on March 23, 2018, by defeating Bandido and Flamita in a tag team match. The following month, during the night one of All Star Weekend on April 20, Rascalz defeated The Chosen Bros (Jeff Cobb and Matt Riddle) and The Young Bucks in a three-way match to capture the World Tag Team Championship. The Rascalz made their first successful title defense the following night against Violence Unlimited. The Rascalz would retain the titles throughout the rest of 2018 and 2019 as they successfully defended the titles against The Young Bucks, Lucha Brothers, Latin American Exchange and Best Friends in quick succession. At Two Hundred, the Rascalz retained the title against LAX and Lucha Brothers in a three-way match. They successfully defended the titles against Flamita and Rey Horus at Mystery Vortex VI and LAX in a ladder match at Sixteen. In 2021, after Xavier and Wentz signed with WWE, PWG vacated the titles and crowned new tag team champions. At 1,025 days, The Rascalz are the longest reigning PWG World Tag Team Champions in history.

=== Impact Wrestling (2018–2020) ===
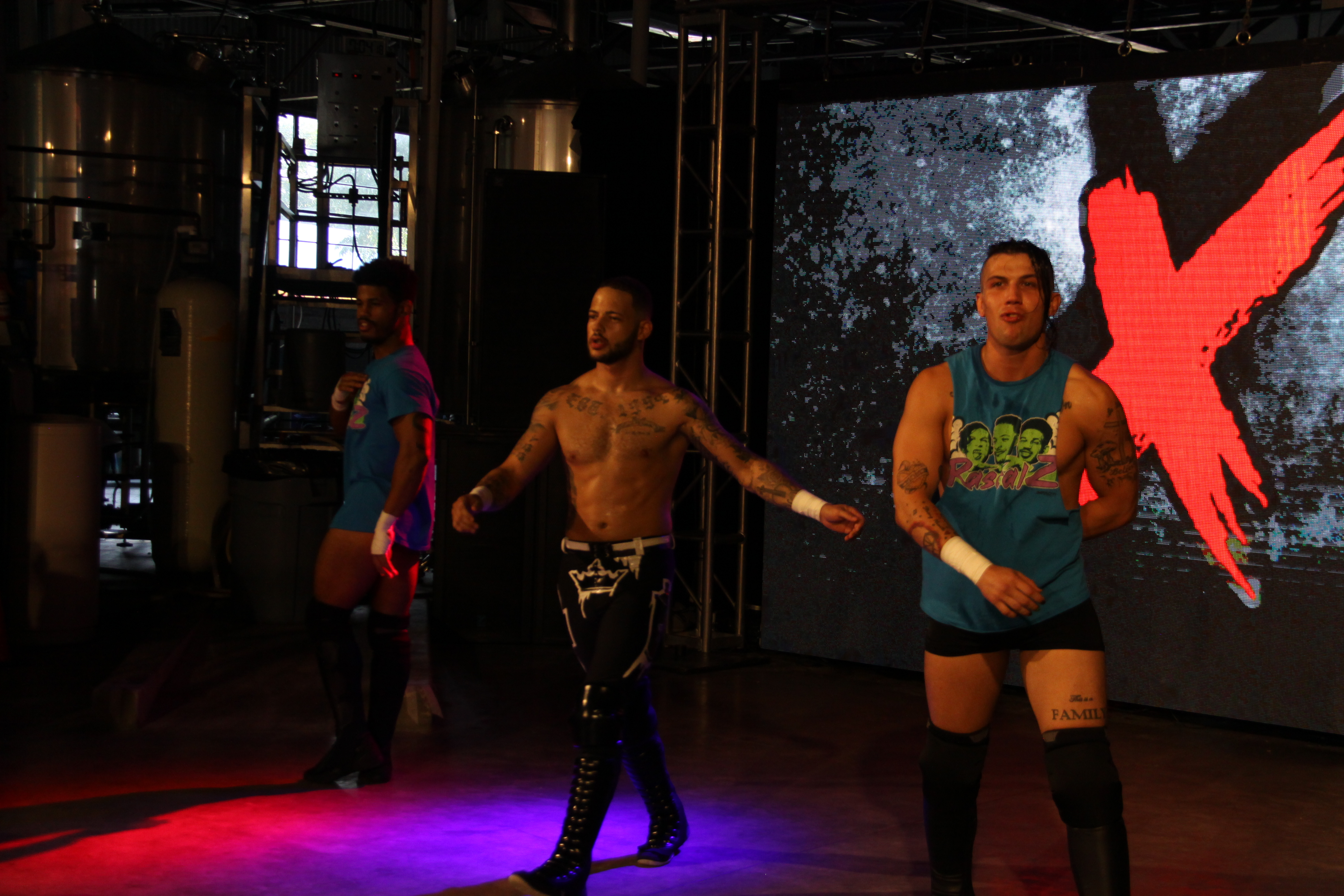
Wentz (right) with Dez (left) and Trey (center) as The Rascalz in July 2019

The Rascalz signed with Impact Wrestling in the fall of 2018. Dezmond Xavier had already worked for Impact, having won the Super X Cup tournament the previous year. Zachary Wentz and Trey Miguel made their first appearance in Impact by teaming with Ace Austin as enhancement talents against oVe (Dave Crist, Jake Crist and Sami Callihan) in a losing effort on the September 6 episode of Impact!. A vignette aired promoting the debut of The Rascalz on the November 15 episode of Impact!. The Rascalz made their debut as a fan favorite team on the November 29 episode of Impact! as Xavier and Wentz (with Miguel in their corner) defeated Chris Bey and Mike Sydal. The Rascalz began their feud against Moose in 2019, which led to The Rascalz making their Impact pay-per-view debut against Moose and The North in a six-man tag team match at Rebellion, which The Rascalz lost. During the match, the ring names of Xavier, Miguel and Wentz were shortened to Dez, Trey and Wentz respectively.

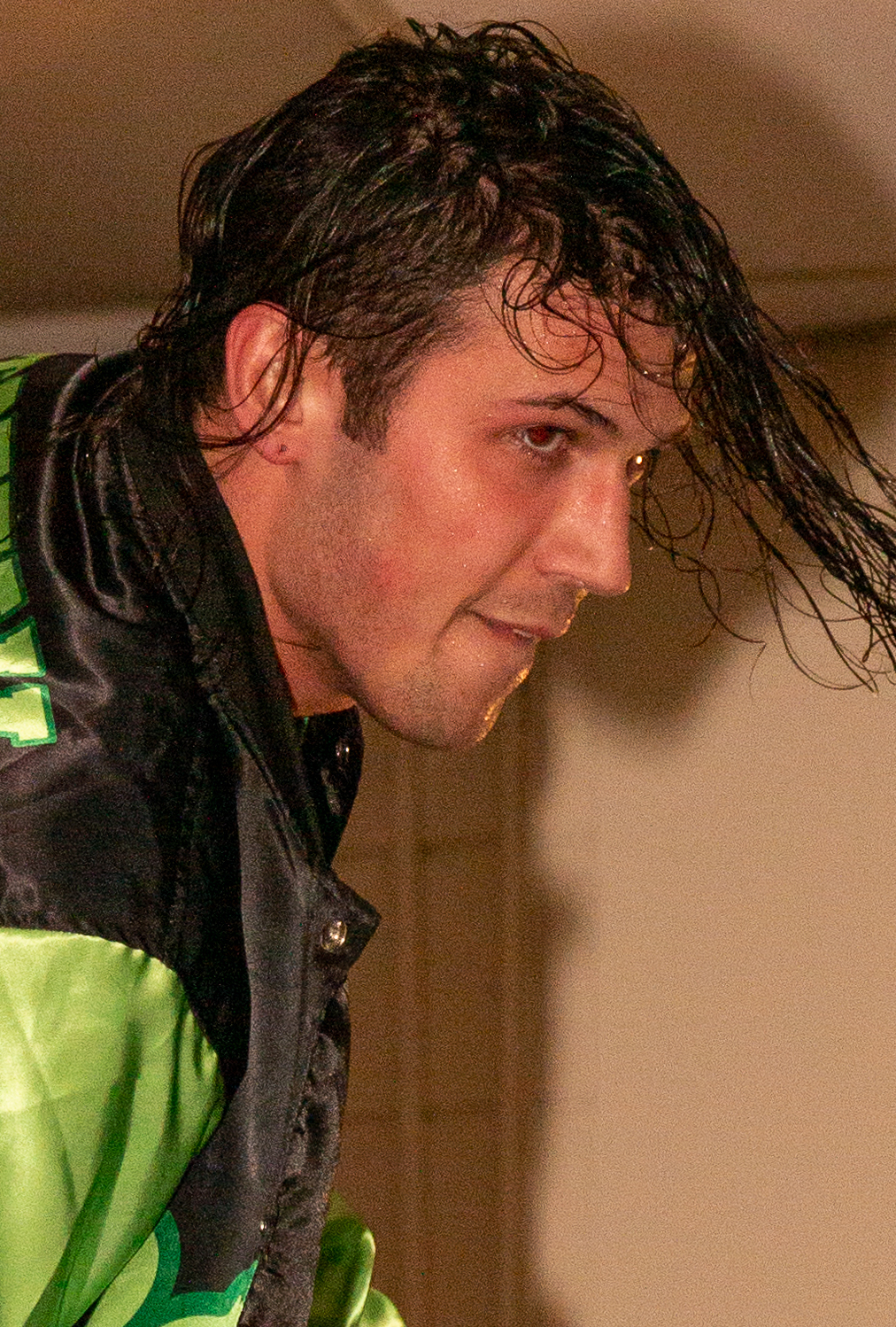
Wentz in November 2019

Dez and Wentz would lose to North at Code Red. The Rascalz would then go on to defeat oVe members Dave Crist, Jake Crist and Madman Fulton at A Night You Can't Mist. On the June 7, 2019 episode of Impact Wrestling, Dez and Wentz received their first opportunity for the Impact World Tag Team Championship against The Latin American Exchange (Santana and Ortiz), which they lost via disqualification after Wentz interfered in the match. This led to a rematch between the two teams for the titles at Slammiversary XVII. On the July 5 episode of Impact Wrestling, Dez and Wentz defeated Trey in a three-way match to earn the right to be LAX's opponents at Slammiversary. In the meantime, LAX lost the titles to The North, which led to North being added into the match, making it a three-way match for the titles, where North retained the titles. Rascalz would then defeat Andy Dalton, Matthew Palmer and Steve O Reno at Bash at the Brewery.

In 2020, at Slammiversary, The Rascalz, represented by Dez and Wentz, issued an open challenge to any tag team. The reunited Motor City Machine Guns accepted the challenge and won the match. On November 11, it was revealed that The Rascalz would be leaving Impact Wrestling amid interest from both WWE and All Elite Wrestling (AEW). During the November 17 tapings, The Rascalz were given a "send off" by the Impact locker room. Miguel confirmed the following day that he, Dez and Wentz were in fact finished with Impact Wrestling. However, Miguel eventually made his return to Impact Wrestling, effectively ending The Rascalz as a trio.

=== WWE (2020–2022) ===
On December 2, 2020, Green signed a contract with WWE and was assigned to the WWE Performance Center. On the January 13, 2021 episode of NXT, Wentz, now going by the ring name Nash Carter, and his tag team partner Xavier, now going by the ring name Wes Lee, debuted under the new team name "MSK". They would debut in the Men's Dusty Rhodes Tag Team Classic tournament, which they would go on to eventually win. At NXT Takeover: Stand & Deliver, MSK defeated Grizzled Young Veterans and Legado Del Fantasma in a triple threat tag team match to win the vacant NXT Tag Team Championship. MSK would have their first successful title defense against the team of Killian Dain and Drake Maverick on the April 13 episode of NXT. At NXT Takeover: In Your House, MSK would team with NXT North American Champion Bronson Reed to take on Legado Del Fantasma in a winners take all match, where the team of MSK and Reed would be successful. At NXT: Halloween Havoc, MSK would lose their titles to Imperium, ending their reign at 201 days. At NXT Stand & Deliver, MSK would win the NXT Tag Team Championship for the second time, defeating Imperium and the Creed Brothers in a triple threat tag team match. On the April 5, 2022 episode of NXT 2.0, MSK would be interrupted by Grayson Waller, stating that he was the one who really made an impact at Stand & Deliver. This was Green's final WWE appearance as WWE released him the next day, following allegations by his ex-wife Kimber Lee and the leaking of a picture of Green imitating Adolf Hitler. Shortly after, the NXT Tag Team Championship were officially vacated.

=== Return to Impact/Total Nonstop Action Wrestling (2023–2026) ===
On the June 29, 2023 episode of Impact!, Wentz made his return to Impact Wrestling, attacking Chris Sabin during his match with Trey Miguel and reuniting The Rascalz as villains in the process. On August 27 at Emergence, Wentz and Miguel won the Impact World Tag Team Championship for the first time in their careers by defeating Subculture (Mark Andrews and Flash Morgan Webster). At Bound For Glory, Wentz and Miguel lost the Impact World Tag Team Championship to ABC (Ace Austin and Chris Bey), ending their reign at 55 days. Soon afterwards, Impact Wrestling announced that they would be rebranding back to the promotion's former name, Total Nonstop Action Wrestling (TNA), and in December, Wentz and Miguel re-signed with TNA.

On the July 4, 2024 episode of TNA Impact!, Wentz seconded Miguel as he took on Leon Slater. The match ended in a no-contest when Charlie Dempsey of the NXT stable No Quarter Catch Crew (NQCC), attacked the other wrestlers, as well as the referee. On the July 11 episode of TNA Impact!, Dempsey, in his TNA in-ring debut, defeated Wentz, after interference from NQCC stablemate Myles Borne. After the match, TNA Director of Authority Santino Marella scheduled a six-man tag team match involving both stables. On the July 18 episode of TNA Impact!, Wentz, Miguel and Kushida were defeated by NQCC. In between tapings, Wentz and Miguel had reunited with Wes Lee on NXT, and at Slammiversary, The Rascalz defeated NQCC. On the August 8 episode of TNA Impact!, Wentz defeated Dante Chen and KC Navarro in a three-way match to qualify for an Ultimate X match at Emergence. On August 30 at Emergence, Wentz defeated champion Mike Bailey, Hammerstone, Jason Hotch, Laredo Kid and NXT's Riley Osborne in the Ultimate X match for TNA X Division Championship, winning it for the first time in his career. At Victory Road on September 13, Wentz lost the title to Mike Bailey, ending his reign at 14 days.

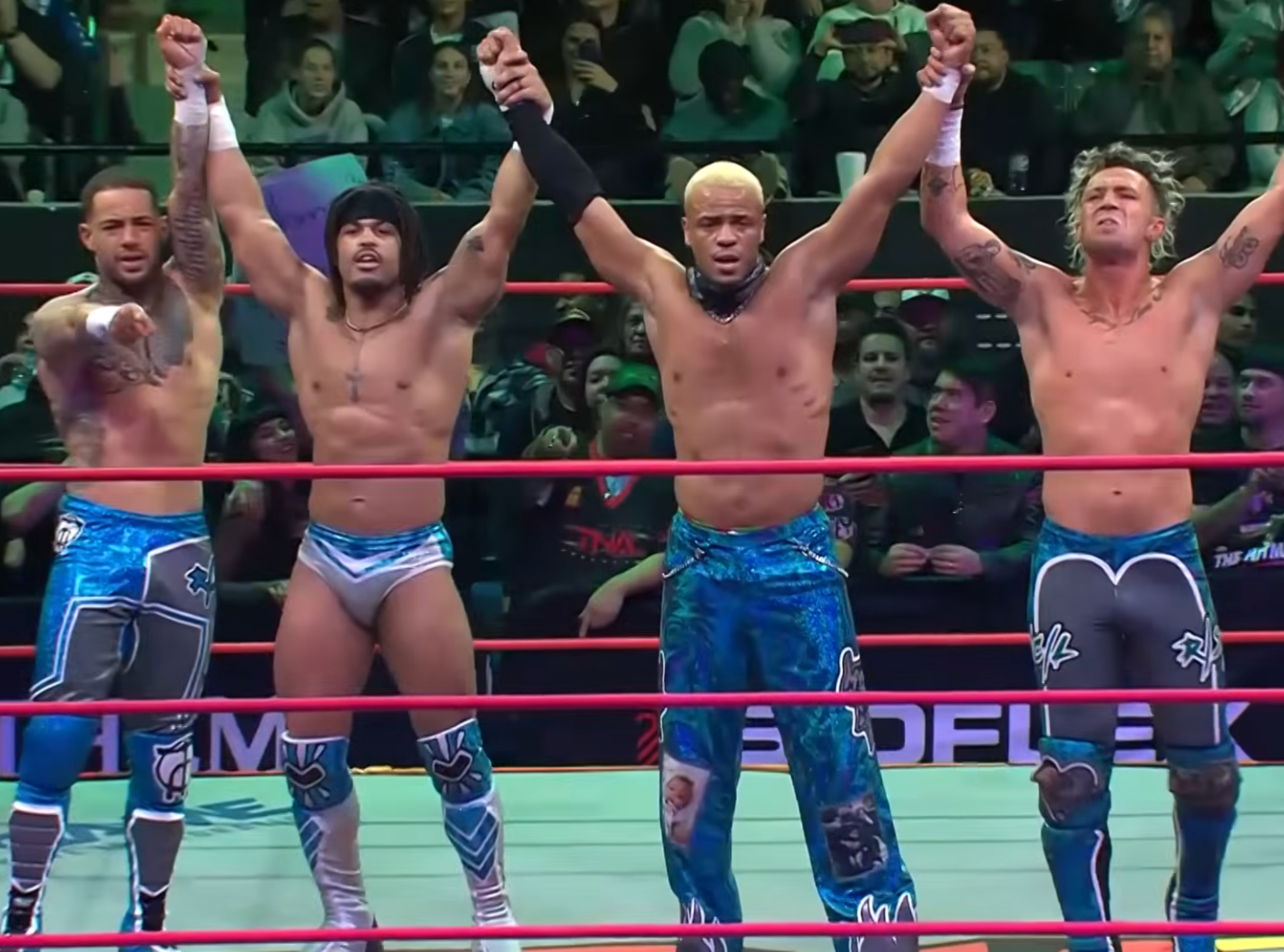
Wentz (far right) as a member of The Rascalz in December 2025

At Genesis on January 19, 2025, Wentz and Miguel failed to defeat TNA World Tag Team Champions The Hardys (Matt Hardy and Jeff Hardy) for the titles. Later that night, it was announced that Wentz and Miguel will face NXT Tag Team Champions Nathan Frazer and Axiom for the titles (Wentz and Miguel were supposed to challenge for the titles in October 2024 but Miguel had to undergo an unexpected surgery) on the January 23 episode of Impact!, where they lost after Lee and his new allies Tyriek Igwe and Tyson Dupont interfered in the match. On the January 30 and February 6 episodes of Impact!, Wentz and Miguel ran out to save Ace Austin from Lee, Igwe and Dupont after Austin's matches against Lee and Dupont respectively. Despite their past differences, Austin joined The Rascalz in their feud against Lee. At Sacrifice on March 14, The Rascalz and Austin defeated Lee, Igwe and Dupont in a "Lucha Rules" six-man tag team match to end the feud. On the July 3 episode of Impact!, Miguel was scheduled to face Nic Nemeth but was later reported as sidelined due to a hernia injury. Wentz replaced Miguel and was accompanied by Reed, who reunited with The Rascalz in the process. At Turning Point on November 14, The Rascalz reunited with the now reverted Dezmond Xavier to defeat The System (Brian Myers, Eddie Edwards, JDC, and Moose) in an eight-man tag team match.

On January 13, 2026, it was reported that all four members of The Rascalz's contracts had expired and TNA elected not to opt-in, making them free agents.

=== Return to WWE (2024–2025) ===
On the July 9, 2024 episode of NXT, Wentz returned to NXT with Trey Miguel to interrupt Wes Lee as Lee was about to announce that he would walk away after losing a Last Chance match for the NXT North American Championship at NXT Heatwave. Miguel and Wentz managed to convince Lee to stay and the trio reunited for the first time since 2020. In his first WWE match since 2022, The Rascalz defeated Gallus (Joe Coffey, Mark Coffey, and Wolfgang) in a six-man tag team match the following week. At Week 2 of NXT: The Great American Bash on August 6, Wentz and Lee failed to defeat NXT Tag Team Champions Nathan Frazer and Axiom for the NXT Tag Team Championship. After the match, Lee turned on Miguel and Wentz, lashing out at the latter for leaving him back in 2022 to turn heel for the first time in his career. Wentz returned to NXT on August 20 to attack Lee and a match between Wentz and Lee was made official for NXT No Mercy a week later. A day after winning the TNA X Division Championship at Emergence, he became the third TNA wrestler to walk into WWE with a TNA championship and he defeated Lee at NXT No Mercy on September 1. Two days later, Miguel and Wentz defeated Gallus (Mark Coffey and Wolfgang) and Hank Walker and Tank Ledger in a triple threat tag team match for a NXT Tag Team Championship match. However, Miguel and Wentz failed to appear for the title match after Lee had taken out Miguel offscreen. In reality, it was reported that Miguel had to undergo an unexpected minor surgery. Lee then challenged Wentz to a Street Fight match at NXT's CW premiere on October 1 where Lee won.

On the May 6, 2025, episode of NXT, Wentz made a temporary return to NXT where he participated in a 25-man battle royal to become the #1 contender for the NXT Championship. During the battle royal, he reignited his feud with Lee but the both men were eventually eliminated. On the September 23 episode of NXT, Wentz, along with other wrestlers of the TNA roster, took part in a major storyline, where they invaded NXT and brawled with various wrestlers on the NXT roster in a build up to NXT vs. TNA Showdown.

=== All Elite Wrestling / Ring of Honor (2026–present) ===
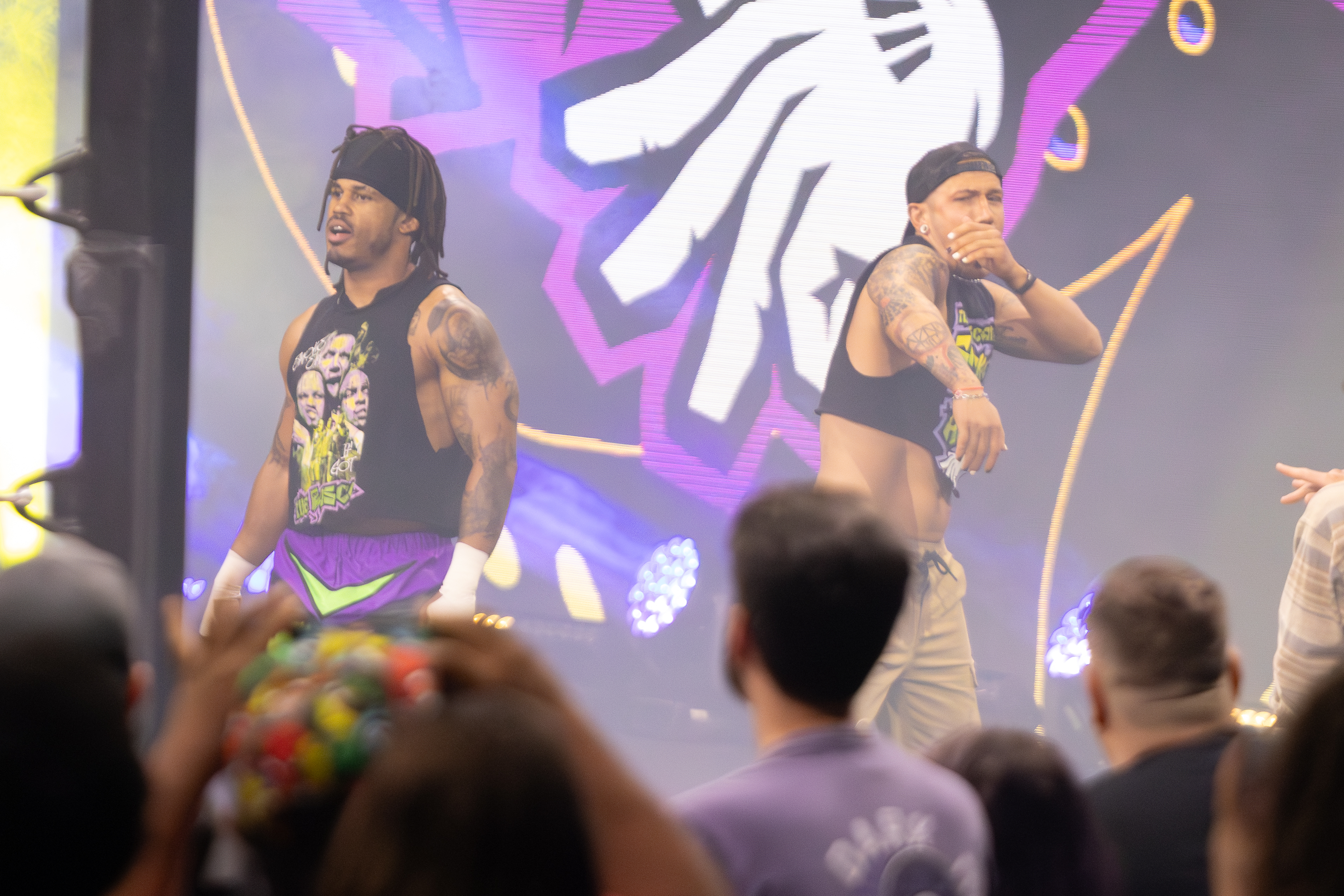
Wentz (right) with Dezmond Xavier (left) in May 2026

In January 2026, it was reported by Fightful Select that Wentz and the rest of The Rascalz (Dezmond Xavier, Myron Reed, and Trey Miguel) had signed with All Elite Wrestling (AEW). On January 14, 2026, at Dynamite: Maximum Carnage, AEW aired a video teasing The Rascalz's arrival. The Rascalz (barring Miguel, due to Miguel being released from AEW for past controversial remarks) made their on-screen debut on January 17 at Collision: Maximum Carnage in a backstage interview with Lexy Nair. On the January 31 episode of Collision, Wentz and Xavier made their AEW in-ring debut, defeating CRU (Action Andretti and Lio Rush). Over the following months, Wentz and his stablemates would challenge for the AEW World Tag Team Championship and the AEW World Trios Championship, as well as appearing for AEW's sister promotion Ring of Honor (ROH).

== Personal life and allegations ==
Green was in a relationship with fellow wrestler Kimber Lee that began in 2018. The couple got engaged in August 2019 and married the following year, in May 2020. Following their separation in 2022, Lee made allegations that Green had domestically assaulted her over a period of time. Shortly after these allegations, a photo was posted by Lee showing Green performing a Nazi salute with a moustache similar to that of Adolf Hitler, which led to him being released by WWE.

As of February 15, 2023, Green has been in a relationship with fellow wrestler Priscilla Kelly. They got engaged in October of that same year.

== Championships and accomplishments ==
- All American Wrestling
  - AAW Tag Team Championship (1 time) – with Dezmond Xavier
- Circle 6 Wrestling
  - Circle 6 World Championship (1 time)
- Burning Heart Pro Wrestling
  - Burning Hearts Pro Tag Team Championship (1 time, inaugural) – with Robbie X
- Combat Zone Wrestling
  - CZW Wired Championship (1 time)
  - CZW World Tag Team Championship (2 times) – with Dezmond Xavier
- Gleat
  - G-Infinity Championship (1 time) – with Trey Miguel
- Total Nonstop Action Wrestling/Impact Wrestling
  - TNA X Division Championship (1 time)
  - Impact World Tag Team Championship (1 time) – with Trey Miguel
  - Impact World Tag Team Championship #1 Contendership Tournament (2023) – with Trey Miguel
- Pro Wrestling Guerrilla
  - PWG World Tag Team Championship (1 time) – with Dezmond Xavier
- Pro Wrestling Illustrated
  - Ranked No. 331 of the top 500 singles wrestlers in the PWI 500 in 2021
- Revolution Pro Wrestling
  - SWE Tag Team Championship (1 time) – with Dezmond Xavier
- Rockstar Pro Wrestling
  - American Luchacore Championship (2 times)
  - Rockstar Pro Championship (1 time)
  - Rockstar Pro Trios Captain Championship (1 time) – with Clayton Jackson and Myron Reed
- The Wrestling Revolver
  - Revolver Remix Championship (1 time, current)
  - Revolver World Tag Team Championship (Note: During his first reign, the title was called the Revolver Tag Team Championship.) (4 times) – with Dezmond Xavier (2), Trey Miguel (3), Myron Reed (1)
  - The F'n Catalina Wrestling Mixer Tournament (2018) – with Dezmond Xavier
- VIP Wrestling
  - VIP Tag Team Championship (1 time) – with Myron Reed
- WrestleCircus
  - WC Big Top Tag Team Championship (1 time, final) – with Trey Miguel
- WWE
  - NXT Tag Team Championship (2 times) – with Wes Lee
  - Men's Dusty Rhodes Tag Team Classic (2021) – with Wes Lee
- Xtreme Intense Championship Wrestling
  - XICW Tag Team Championship (1 time) – with Aaron Williams, Dave Crist, Kyle Maverick, Trey Miguel, and Dezmond Xavier
