= Sami Callihan =

American professional wrestler (born 1987)

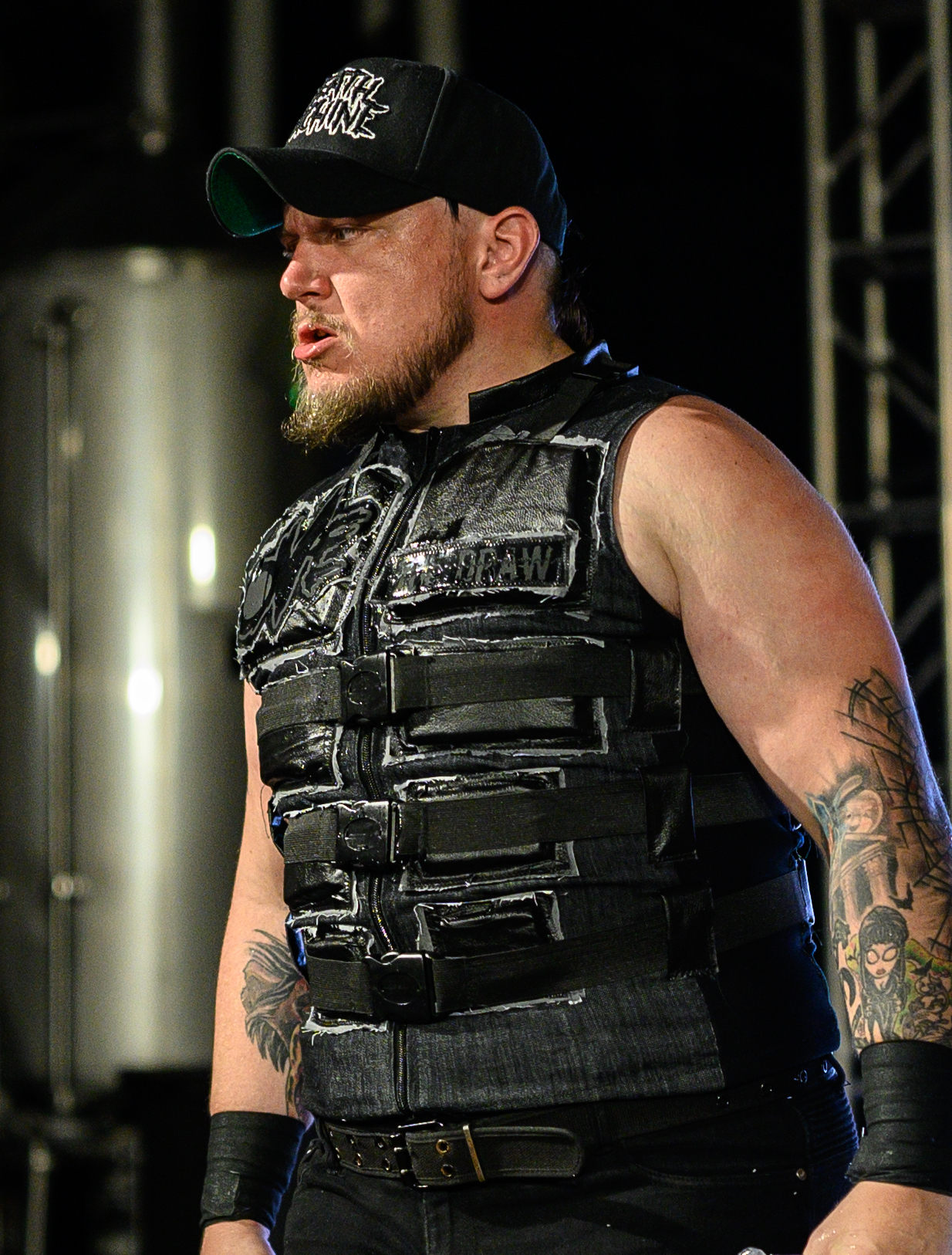
- Callihan in 2019

Personal information
- Born: Samuel Alton Johnston; September 1, 1987 (age 39) Bellefontaine, Ohio, U.S.
- Spouse: Jessicka Havok (engaged)

Professional wrestling career
- Ring name(s): Jeremiah Crane; Jeremiah Snake; Sami Callihan; Callihan; Solomon Crowe
- Billed height: 5 ft 10 in (178 cm)
- Billed weight: 200 lb (91 kg)
- Billed from: Dayton, Ohio
- Trained by: One Man Kru; Shark Boy; Cody Hawk
- Debut: 2005
- Retired: August 15, 2025

Samuel Alton Johnston (born September 1, 1987), better known by the ring name Sami Callihan, is an American professional wrestling promoter and retired wrestler. He is the founder and owner of The Wrestling Revolver. He is best known for his tenures in Total Nonstop Action Wrestling (TNA). He is also known for his tenures with Lucha Underground under the ring names Jeremiah Crane, and later, Jeremiah Snake, and in WWE under the ring name Solomon Crowe.

He worked for several independent promotions throughout the United States. He found most success in Combat Zone Wrestling (CZW) and Major League Wrestling (MLW), but has also wrestled for Dragon Gate USA, Evolve, Ring of Honor, Pro Wrestling Guerrilla, Full Impact Pro, and All American Wrestling. In CZW, he held the CZW Iron Man Championship, the CZW Ultraviolent Underground Championship, and the CZW World Junior Heavyweight Championship, and won the 2012 Best of the Best tournament. He founded the independent wrestling promotion called The Wrestling Revolver in 2016.

== Professional wrestling career ==
=== Independent circuit (2006–2013) ===
Shortly after his debut, Callihan became a member of "The Crew" faction, which also consisted of Jon Moxley, Dick Rick and Pepper Parks. Callihan began regularly competing for the Heartland Wrestling Association, and faced wrestlers including Chad Collyer and Nigel McGuinness. He competed in Chikara's 2008 Young Lions Tournament but did not win the tournament. He advanced to the finals of the 2008 Ted Petty Invitational tournament with victories over Chris Hero, Eddie Kingston and 2 Cold Scorpio. On September 28, 2008, he competed for the HWA Heavyweight Championship in a three-way match, also involving Drake Younger, but lost to Jake Crist. On November 26, 2008, he was eliminated by HWA Heavyweight Champion Jake Crist in the Thanksgiving Eve eight-man tag team elimination match. In a rematch on October 1, 2008, he was again defeated by Jake Crist. In 2011, Callihan made it to the final of the first Heartland Cup tournament against Jake Crist.

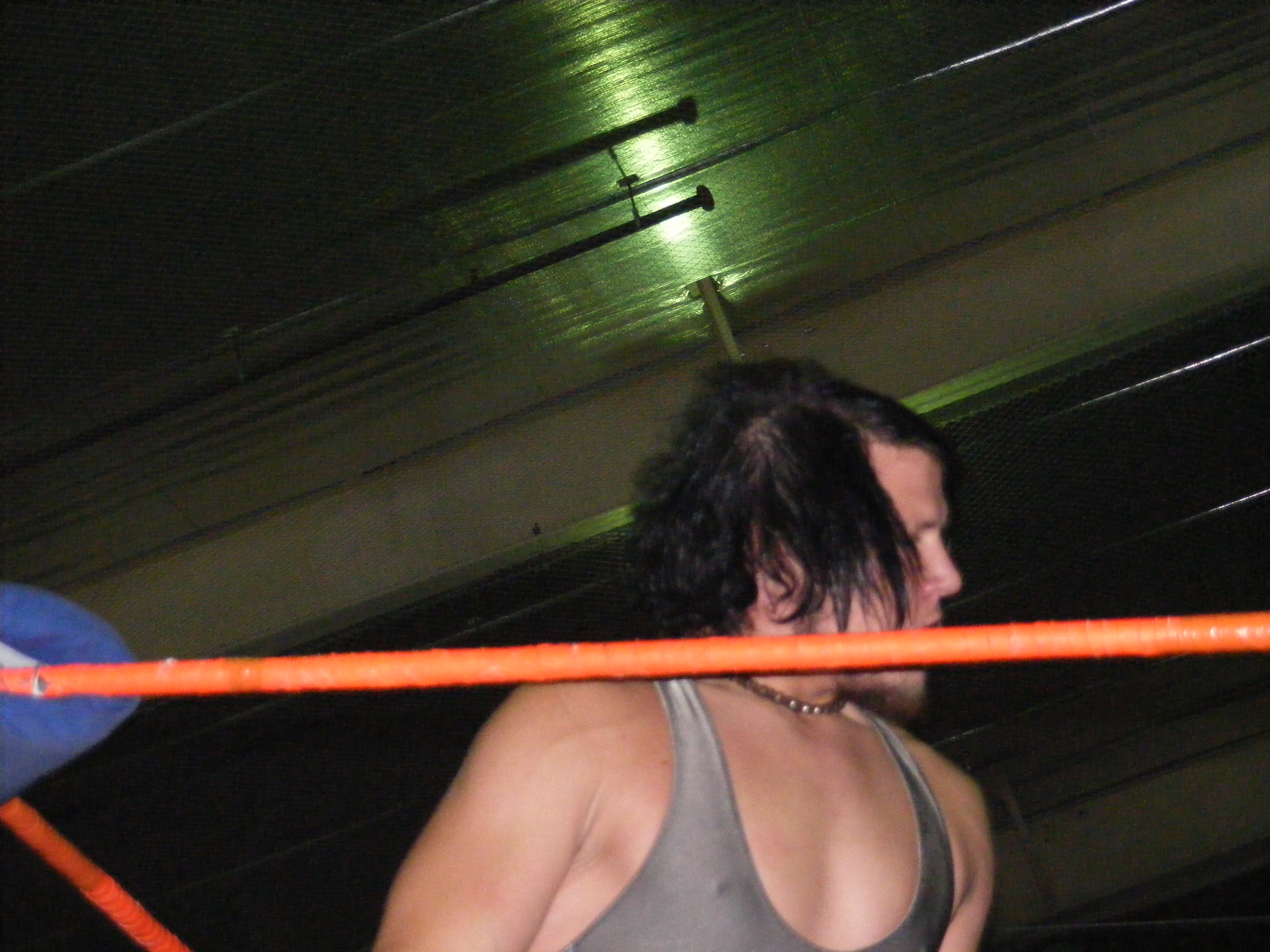
Callihan during a 2CW show in September 2011

Callihan began wrestling for IPW throughout 2006 as "Cannonball Sami" until late 2006 when he underwent a name change to Sami Callihan. In 2007 at IPW Reign Of The Insane 6th Anniversary Show Callihan gained entry into the IPW 2007 Super Junior Heavyweight tournament beating Dustin Rayz, xOMGx, and Louis Linaris to qualify, but lost in the first round to Diehard. In 2008 at Uprising Callihan began feuding with IPW Junior Heavyweight Champion Billy Roc after a controversial double pin in a four-way match for the title, also involving Ricochet and Shiima Xion. The next month at Legally Insane Callihan and Roc teamed up in a losing effort against "The Messiahs of a New Age" of Dustin Rayz and Lou Roberts. Callihan and Roc would have their first singles match for the Junior Heavyweight Championship at Heatstroke which ended in a time limit draw. The next month at Crowning Point Callihan and Roc wrestled in a Pure Rules match, which ended in a no contest, and the pair faced off at IPW Reign of the Insane 7th Anniversary in a ladder match in which Callihan beat Roc for the IPW Junior Heavyweight Championship. The next month at the IPW Super Junior Heavyweight Tournament Callihan defeated Q Skillz, CJ Otis, and Justin Andrews en route to the final, where he lost the Junior Heavyweight Championship to Aaron Williams. Callihan would not make another appearance for IPW until late 2009 at Reign of the Insane Stage 2 8th Anniversary losing to James Avery. On May 18, 2010, he defeated Toby Klein at the JC Bailey benefit show. Callihan returned to competing regularly for IPW in 2011. At IPW Showdown In Naptown Callihan defeated Kyle O'Reilly, and later that night formed an alliance with IPW World Heavyweight Champion Jimmy Jacobs by saving him from an attack by Dustin Rayz and Sweet Lou Roberts. On May 7, 2011, at Keep the Faith Callihan would wrestle in a four-way match also involving Jake Crist, AR Fox, and Zack Sabre Jr. with Fox winning the match. On June 18 at Revelations Callihan defeated Jake Crist for the vacant IPW World Heavyweight Championship. Callihan held the championship until November 7, 2011, at Insane Intentions, when he lost it to Jake Crist in a triple threat match that also involved B. J. Whitmer.

On May 29, 2009, Callihan debuted for Pro Wrestling Syndicate at their Brawl For Paul event, where he lost a four-way match, also involving Xavier, Monsta Mack, and winner Trent Acid. On August 10, 2010, Callihan was part of The PWS Majestic Twelve Title Tournament. In the opening round he teamed with Dan Maff to defeat Adam Cole and Bandido Jr, and went on to defeat Maff in the second. In the final Callihan pinned Danny Demanto, but was then pinned by Devon Moore. On May 27, 2011, Callihan defeated Dan Maff, and then defeated Devon Moore to win the PWS Heavyweight Championship in a match that included run-ins by Kevin Matthews, Maff, Danny Demanto, Velvet Sky, and Mick Foley. He went to defend the championship against Colt Cabana, Jay Lethal, and The Great Muta.

=== Combat Zone Wrestling (2008–2013) ===
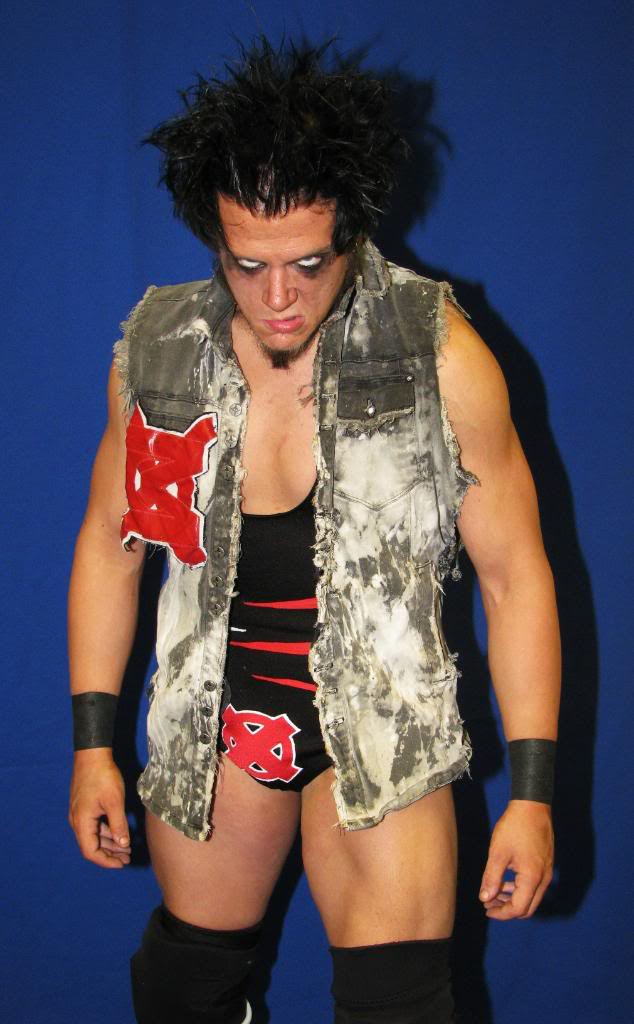
Callihan in 2010

Callihan made his CZW debut at "Summer School" on June 14, 2008. At the 2008 Chri$ Ca$h Memorial Show, he won the Chri$ Ca$h Memorial Battle Royal. He defeated LuFisto to earn a spot in the main event at Cage Of Death X.

At the Decade of Destruction – 10th Anniversary show on February 14, 2009, in Philadelphia, Pennsylvania, Callihan defeated Jon Dahmer; originally the match was supposed to be Dahmer versus E.M.O., but as E.M.O. was making his way to the ring, the Arena's video screens showed Callihan arguing with CZW management and demanding a title match. Management denied his request, and instead told him that if he defeated Dahmer he could have a title match whenever he wanted. This led to Callihan attacking E.M.O. and taking his spot in the match against Dahmer, which he then won after a distraction by the debuting Jon Moxley who was fleeing from security through the crowd. Later, it would be revealed that Callihan and Moxley were partners, and in that same night Callihan went to the ring after CZW Iron Man Champion Brain Damage and his Cult Fiction tag team partner Deranged had lost a match to The H8 Club. He brought a referee with him, and after Callihan threatened him, the referee sanctioned an immediate match, which Callihan won to become the new champion. At the Eye for an Eye event on April 13, Callihan declared that the championship would now be known as the "CZW New Horror Championship". On June 13, 2009, Callihan lost the championship to Egotistico Fantastico. On October 25, 2009, Callihan defeated Danny Havoc to win the CZW Ultraviolent Underground Championship, but lost the title the same day to Thumbtack Jack. On April 10, 2010, at Swingin For The Fences Callihan received a match for the CZW World Heavyweight Championship in a losing effort against Switchblade Conspiracy partner Jon Moxley. In November 2011, Callihan defeated Adam Cole for the CZW World Junior Heavyweight Championship. The following April, Callihan won the Best of the Best XI tournament. He lost the title to Drake Younger at 5 de Mayo. Callihan won the title for a second time on July 14, 2012, in a 60-minute Ultraviolent Rules Iron Man match, but lost it the same day to AR Fox.

=== Ring of Honor (2008–2009) ===
On November 11, 2008, Callihan made his Ring of Honor debut at Escalation in a losing effort in a four-corner survival match also involving Go Shiozaki, Rhett Titus, and Grizzly Redwood. Callihan appeared on the inaugural episode of Ring of Honor Wrestling on HDNet, which aired on March 21, losing to Kenny King.

=== Evolve (2010–2013) ===
On May 1, 2010, Callihan debuted for Evolve at Evolve 3: Rise or Fall in a winning effort against Adam Cole. On July 23, at Evolve 4: Danielson vs Fish, Callihan gained his second victory defeating Arik Cannon via submission. Matches against wrestlers including Zack Sabre Jr., Brodie Lee, AR Fox, Bobby Fish, and Dave "Fit" Finlay at Evolve 9 followed. On April 5, 2013, Callihan took part in a tournament to determine the inaugural Evolve Champion, where he made it to the finals, before losing to AR Fox.

=== Dragon Gate USA (2010–2011) ===
On July 24, 2010, Callihan made his debut for Dragon Gate USA, losing to Jimmy Jacobs in a dark match. After wrestling several matches for the promotion through the rest of the year, Callihan was placed in his first angle on April 3, 2011, at Open the Ultimate Gate, when he and Arik Cannon walked out on a six-way match. Later in the event, Callihan and Cannon announced they would be forming a tag team named the D.U.F. (Dirty Ugly Fucks) and defeated The Dark City Fight Club (Jon Davis and Kory Chavis) in their first match together. On June 5 at Enter The Dragon 2011, Callihan and Arik Cannon were joined by Pinkie Sanchez, and picked up a major win over the tag team of Open the Dream Gate Champion Masaaki Mochizuki and Susumu Yokosuka.

=== Pro Wrestling Guerrilla (2012–2013) ===
Callihan made his debut for the Southern California-based company Pro Wrestling Guerrilla (PWG) on April 21, 2012. At the sixth annual Dynamite Duumvirate Tag Team Title Tournament, he teamed with Roderick Strong to take on 2 Husky Black Guys (El Generico and Willie Mack) in a losing effort in the opening round. After the match, Callihan challenged PWG World Champion Kevin Steen to a title match, which took place later that day; Callihan lost the match. In his next appearance on July 21, he was beaten by Michael Elgin at PWG's nine-year anniversary event, Threemendous III. In September, he got his first series of wins at the 2012 Battle of Los Angeles; he defeated Willie Mack to advance to the quarterfinal round, where he beat T. J. Perkins. In the semi-final, he lost to eventual winner Adam Cole. At Mystery Vortex on December 1, he was victorious over Drake Younger. After the match, it was announced that Callihan and Younger would participate in a best of three match series to determine a number one contender for the PWG World Championship. At the 2013 Dynamite Duumvirate Tag Team Title Tournament, which took place on January 12, 2013, Callihan fought Younger in a non-tournament knockout or submission-only match. Callihan lost the bout when he tapped out, tying the score. On March 22, 2013, Callihan lost the series, when he was defeated by Younger in the third match, a Guerrilla Warfare match. On June 15, Callihan wrestled his PWG farewell match, a 60-minute Iron Man match, where he unsuccessfully challenged longtime rival Adam Cole for the PWG World Championship, losing the match six falls to five.

=== WWE (2012–2015) ===
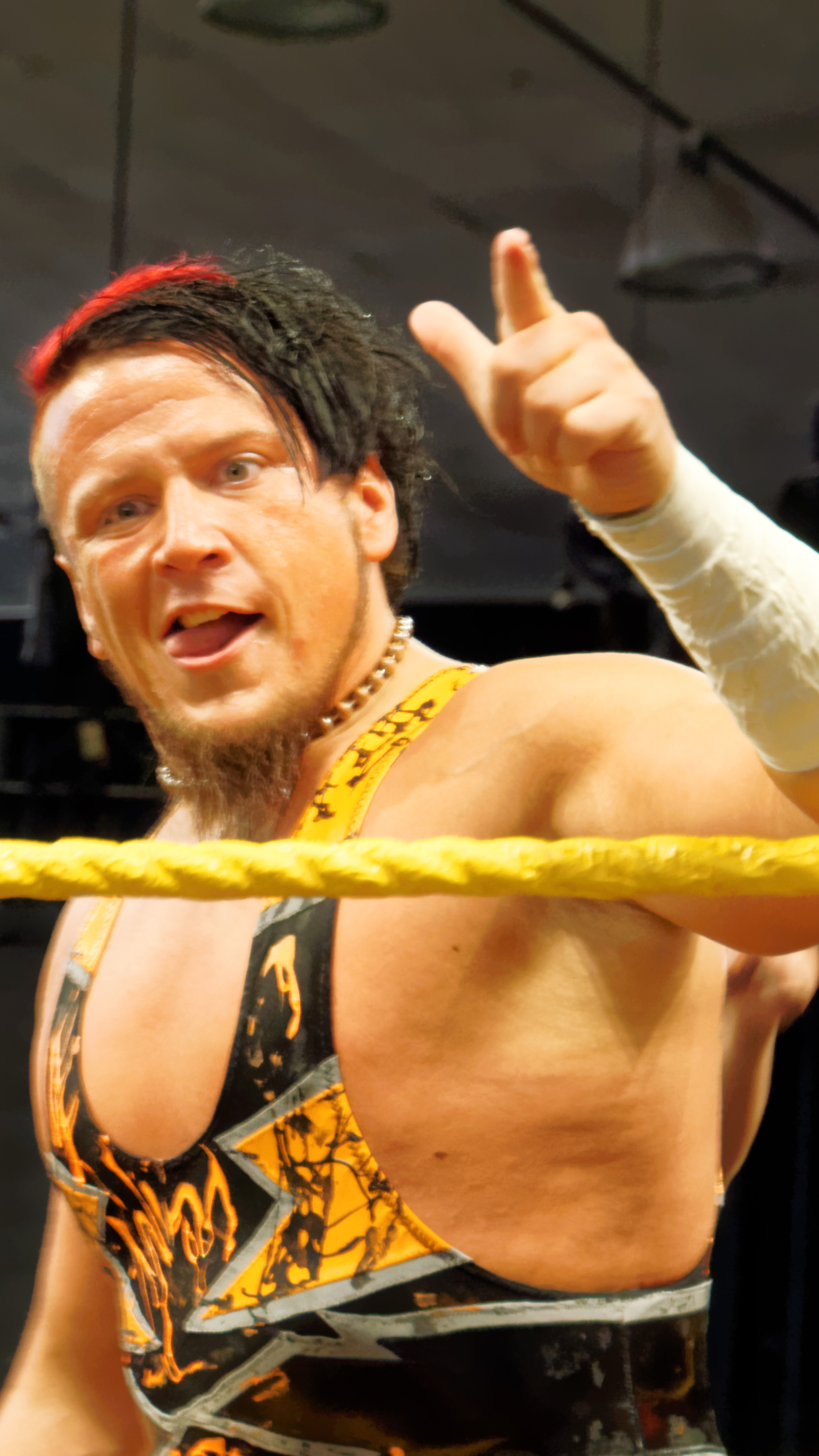
Solomon Crowe in 2015

On October 23, 2012, Johnston wrestled a dark match for WWE, in which he was defeated by Johnny Curtis. In April 2013, it was reported that Johnston was undergoing medical tests for the promotion, and on May 27 Dragon Gate USA confirmed that Johnston had signed with WWE.

On August 29, 2013, under the new WWE ring name Solomon Crowe, he debuted for WWE's developmental system NXT, with a loss to Xavier Woods at a live event. He would fail to appear on televised episodes of NXT for more than a year, instead being restricted to live events or dark matches during television tapings. At a live event on December 6, 2013, Crowe assumed the character of a hacker, using a tablet computer to seize control of the arena lights, and attacked Kalisto. At the February 28, 2014, NXT television tapings, Crowe defeated Sylvester Lefort in what would have been his NXT television debut, but the match was removed from the episode; it was supposed to air for the March 6, 2014 NXT. In August 2014, Johnston suffered a chipped tibia during a tag team match with Kalisto against The Ascension; the injury did not require surgery and he was able to return to the ring in November. In late 2014, Crowe wrestled a number of dark matches on NXT, including one against the returning Brian Kendrick.

From the January 28, 2015, episode of NXT, WWE began airing teasers for Crowe's television debut. On the February 18 episode of NXT, Crowe made his television debut as a face, attacking CJ Parker. In his first televised match on the March 4 episode of NXT, he defeated Bull Dempsey.

On November 24, 2015, WWE announced that Johnston was released from his WWE contract.

=== Return to the independent circuit (2015–2025) ===
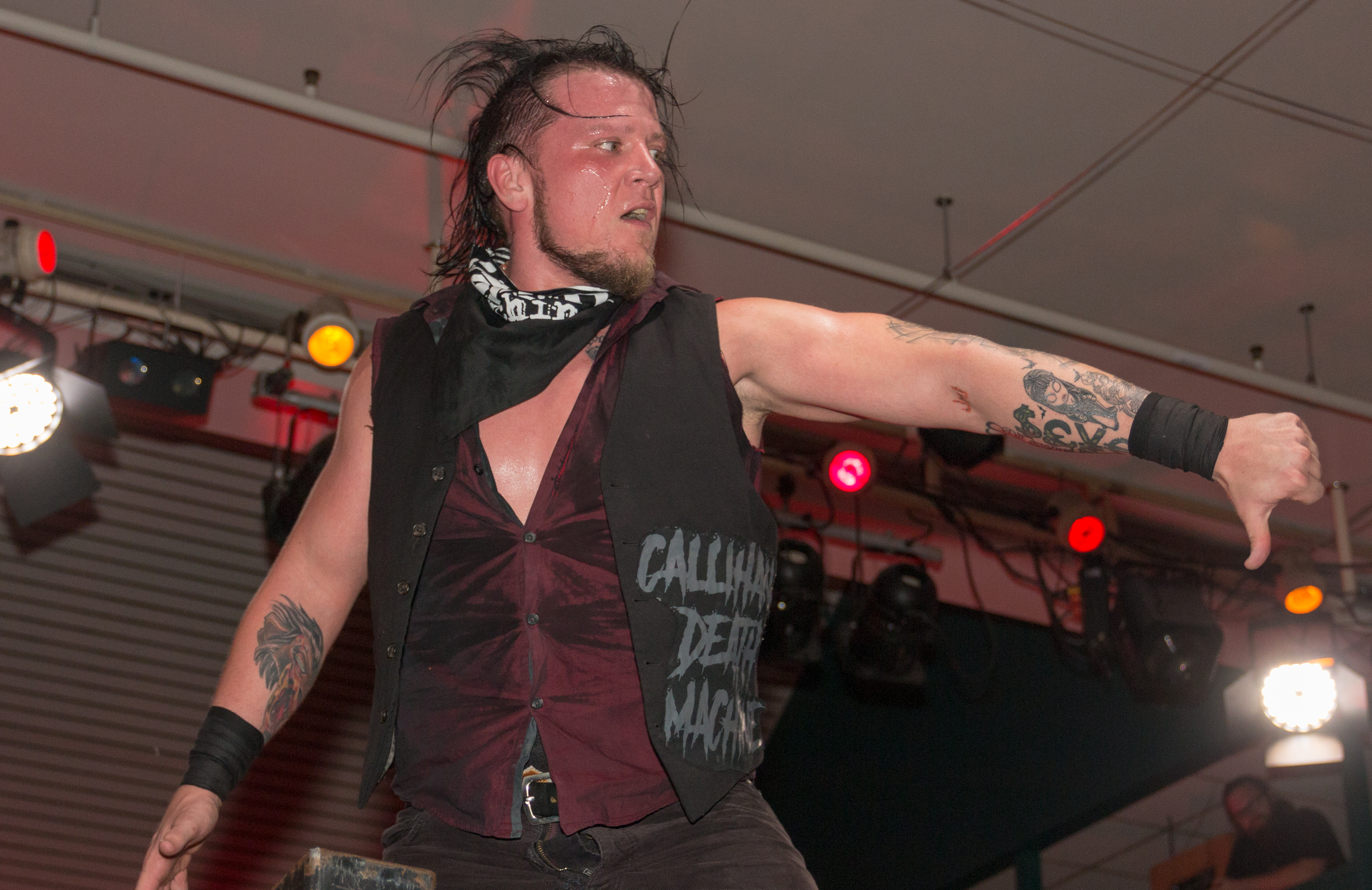
Callihan posing post-match at a Smash Wrestling show in 2017

On November 28, 2015, after being released from WWE, Johnston returned to the independent circuit, switching back to his Sami Callihan character where he appeared at All American Wrestling's Windy City Classic XI event. He attacked new AAW Heavyweight Champion, Eddie Kingston.

On December 4, 2015, he returned to Rockstar Pro Wrestling to face and defeat long time friend Jake Crist at the Killer XMas iPPV.

Callihan returned to Combat Zone Wrestling at Cage of Death XVII on December 12, 2015, defeating David Starr.

On December 11, 2015, Callihan returned to Pro Wrestling Guerrilla in the first night of All-Star Weekend event, where he defeated Drew Gulak.

Callihan debuted for PROGRESS Wrestling in May 2016 during the 2016 Super Strong Style 16 tournament, beating Matt Cross in the first round and losing to Tommy End in the quarter finals.

On May 21, 2016, Callihan defeated John Skyler to win the Premiere Wrestling Xperience World Heavyweight Championship.

On July 8, 2016, Callihan returned to Fight Club: PRO at the "Rage Against The Death Machine" event. After making it his intention to give the Fight Club: PRO Championship world title status, he later defeated Trent Seven to win the vacant championship.

On June 8, 2018, Callihan defeated Evander James for House of Glory's Crown Jewel Championship at their "Temperature Rising" show. He retained the title at their "High Intensity 7" show on August 17 against Low Ki after hitting him with a low blow to intentionally get himself disqualified. After the match, Bully Ray appeared and powerbombed Callihan.

On November 2, 2019, Callihan debuted for Insane Championship Wrestling with a victory over BT Gunn at Fear & Loathing XII in Glasgow, Scotland. He returned to ICW to compete against the likes of Jeff Jarrett, Viper, Andy Wild, Trent Seven and Grado for a shot at the ICW World Heavyweight Championship in the 2020 Square Go! match.

=== Return to PWG (2015–2017) ===
On December 11, 2015, Callihan returned to PWG at All Star Weekend 11, defeating Drew Gulak. On January 2, 2016, at PWG Lemy, Callihan defeated Trevor Lee. He then started a losing streak being defeated by the likes of Jack Evans, Roderick Strong, Marty Scurll and Cody Rhodes at the first round of the Battle Of Los Angeles 2016. On February 18, 2017, at Only Kings Understand Each Other, Callihan returned along with the debuting OI4K (Jake & Dave Crist), being defeated by The Superkliq (Adam Cole and The Young Bucks). On May 19, at PWG Head Like A Cole, Callihan would pick a victory over former rival Adam Cole. The next month at Man On the Silver Mountain, Callihan defeated Matt Sydal. At the 2017 Battle of Los Angeles, Callihan was eliminated by Jeff Cobb in the first round.

=== Return to CZW (2015–2018) ===
On December 12, 2015, at Cage of Death XVII, Callihan returned to CZW, defeating David Starr. In July 2017, in a behind-the-scenes promotion, Callihan was appointed the leader of CZW's creative team.

On April 15, 2018, he left CZW after a disagreement with the new direction of the promotion.

=== Lucha Underground (2016–2019) ===
On January 10, 2016, Callihan wrestled a dark match at a Lucha Underground taping against King Cuerno and Flamita. In March 2016, Callihan signed a deal to appear in the third season of Lucha Underground. He made his debut in a segment on the October 5, 2016, episode of Lucha Underground as Ivelisse's boyfriend Jeremiah Crane. The following week, Crane attacked Marty Martinez and Mariposa following Ivelisse's match. Crane competed in Aztec Warfare III entering at number four, but was the first to be eliminated by Matanza Cueto. Crane would then compete in the Battle of the Bulls tournament, defeating AR Fox, Killshot and Mariposa in the first round. In the finals of the tournament, Crane competed in an elimination fatal-4-way match, being eliminated by the eventual winner, Willie Mack. Crane made his return at Aztec Warfare IV on the first episode of season 4 in the Aztec Warfare entering at number 14 but got eliminated by pinfall by Pentagon Dark. Later that season in Episode 3 he got put in a casket by Mil Muertes after Ivelisse bloodied him. He would return on Episode 9, now under the new name of Jeremiah Snake, as a member of the Reptile Tribe, teaming with Daga, Drago, and Kobra Moon in a losing effort against Aerostar and the Worldwide Underground (Johnny Mundo, PJ Black, and Taya). In the episode, The Reptile Tribe won the Lucha Underground Trios Championship from Killshot, The Mack, and Son of Havoc. The series was discontinued after season finale, Ultima Lucha Cuatro.

=== Pro Wrestling Revolver / The Wrestling Revolver (2016–present) ===
In 2016, Callihan founded his own independent promotion Pro Wrestling Revolver (later known as The Wrestling Revolver). The promotion held their first event on June 10, 2016 titled The Debut at the 7 Flags Event Center in Clive, Iowa. The event featured various notable wrestlers such as Scotty 2 Hotty, Tommy Dreamer, Billy Gunn, Bob Holly, and Rhyno.

=== Major League Wrestling (2017–2019) ===
On October 5, 2017, Callihan wrestled his first match for Major League Wrestling (MLW) at MLW's first show since 2004. At the event, called One Shot he lost a match to Montel Vontavious Porter. He went on to a major focal point of their weekly show MLW Fusion throughout 2018 into 2019. At some point in 2018 Callihan begun working as a senior agent for Major League Wrestling. In June 2019, Callihan lost a Loser Leaves MLW against Mance Warner, leaving the promotion.

=== Impact Wrestling (2017–2023) ===
==== Ohio Versus Everything (2017–2019) ====
On November 5, 2017, at Bound for Glory, Callihan made his debut for Impact Wrestling as a villain by interfering in a 5150 Street Fight for the World Tag Team Championship, helping Ohio Versus Everything (Dave and Jake Crist) defeat Santana and Ortiz of The Latin American Xchange (LAX) to retain the title. Callihan and The Crist Brothers then formed a faction named Ohio Versus Everything (oVe), where they started a feud with LAX. On the December 14 episode of Impact, Callihan would light a fire flame in the face of Konnan after a face to face summit. On the January 18, 2018, episode of Impact, oVe would then challenge LAX in a Barbed Wire Massacre match, where they lost the match, thus ending the feud. Callihan shortly after became the leader of oVe. Callihan made his pay-per-view debut for Impact at the Redemption event on April 22, 2018, where oVe defeated Eddie Edwards, Moose and Tommy Dreamer in a House of Hardcore match. oVe began a lengthy feud against The Lucha Brothers (Pentagón Jr. and Fénix) in the summer of 2018, which led to a mask vs. hair match between Callihan and Pentagón at Slammiversary XVI, which Callihan lost, which led to Callihan's hair being shaved off by the Lucha Brothers. Callihan and Pentagón had a rematch on the August 23 episode of Impact, a Mexican Death match, which Callihan won. The rivalry continued between the two teams with Brian Cage joining the Lucha Brothers in the feud. This led to an oVe Rules match pitting oVe against Cage and the Lucha Brothers at Bound for Glory, which oVe won when Callihan pinned Cage. This win earned Callihan, his first title shot in Impact Wrestling against Cage for the latter's X Division Championship on the November 15 episode of Impact, which Callihan lost.

In early 2019, oVe entered a feud with the team of Rich Swann, Tommy Dreamer and Willie Mack, which led to Callihan defeating Mack at the Homecoming pay-per-view but lost a rematch on the January 11 episode of Impact. Callihan would begin pursuing Swann's X Division Championship, unsuccessfully challenging him for the title on the March 22 episode of Impact and in an oVe Rules match at Rebellion. Callihan concluded his feud with Dreamer by defeating him in an oVe rules match at the Impact Plus event Code Red. Callihan began ascending up the ranks as he defeated Eddie Edwards in a Philly Street Fight at A Night You Can't Mist. Callihan would then lose to Rob Van Dam in an Extreme Rules match at Bash at the Brewery in July.

==== Impact World Champion (2019–2020) ====
In the summer of 2019, Callihan began a lengthy feud with Tessa Blanchard regarding intergender wrestling where he claimed that men were superior to women. The two had their first encounter in the main event of Slammiversary XVII, which Callihan won. The match was awarded the Match of the Year Award by Impact. Callihan and Blanchard were randomly paired in the Mashup Tournament on the July 19 episode of Impact, where they defeated Dave Crist and Trey to qualify for a fatal four-way elimination match against Eddie Edwards and Moose, Jake Crist and Wentz and Michael Elgin and Willie Mack. Callihan and Blanchard won the match to qualify for a match at the Unbreakable event, which Callihan won, becoming the #1 contender for the Impact World Championship in the process.

Subsequently, Callihan began feuding with the World Champion Brian Cage, unsuccessfully challenging him for the title at Bound for Glory. However, Callihan goaded Cage into giving him a rematch by invading Cage's house. On the October 29 episode of Impact, Callihan defeated Cage in a steel cage match to win the Impact World Championship. He successfully defended the title against Cage in a rematch at Turning Point and Rich Swann at No Surrender before losing the title to rival Tessa Blanchard at Hard to Kill pay-per-view on January 12, 2020.

==== Various storylines (2020–2023) ====
During tapings of Impact, a mysterious figure appeared on the titantron called ICU during wrestlers matches. On March 17, ICU interrupted Ken Shamrock's interview with Josh Mathews. The mysterious figure threw a fireball into Shamrock's eyes. He took off the mask and it was revealed to be Sami Callihan. Callihan would take his phone and the lights would go off and he would disappear. The feud would culminate at Rebellion 2020 Night 1 in an Unsanctioned match, where Shamrock submitted Callihan to an ankle lock. He returned on June 30, 2020, surprisingly helping Shamrock against The North before disappearing into the night, teasing a face turn in the process. Shamrock and Callihan unsuccessfully challenged The North for the Impact Tag Team Championships at Slammiversary.

On August 4, Callihan was about to face Eddie Edwards for the Impact World Championship, but was attacked by Rob Van Dam as he was making his way to the ring, and ultimately succumbing to Edwards. The following week, Callihan hacked into Katie Forbes' photos during her photo reveal, thus starting a feud with Van Dam and turning face for the first time in Impact Wrestling. Callihan and Van Dam would face off against each other on the September 1 episode of Impact in which Callihan was victorious, but ultimately suffered a post-match attack from Van Dam and Katie Forbes. On the September 22nd episode of Impact, Callihan faced Rob Van Dam in a rematch, this time RVD was victorious and due to Van Dam winning, Katie Forbes got 5 minutes alone in the ring with Sami. However, Callihan laid out RVD outside the ring and delivered a Piledriver to Katie Forbes. The following week, Callihan turned back into a heel and interrupted Eddie Edwards before Eddie got attacked by Ken Shamrock, who also turned heel in that segment.

Beginning in mid 2021, when Impact started a working relation with All Elite Wrestling, Callihan turned face when he started feuding with Kenny Omega, The Good Brothers, and Don Callis, after they had been costing him multiple opportunities at the Impact World Championship. The feud eventually culminated to Slammiversary where Callihan and Omega wrestled for the Impact World Championship in a No Disqualification match, a match where Omega would retain in the end. On September 20, it was reported that Callihan has suffered a broken ankle and he would be out of action until the spring of 2022. Callihan returned at the Under Siege event, on May 7, 2022, attacking Moose.

==== Ohio Versus Everything reunion (2023) ====
After spending the bulk of December feuding with The Design, on the January 12, 2023, episode of Impact, Callihan decided to join The Design, having Deaner shave his head as initiation and being renamed simply as Callihan, turning heel in the process. On April 16, 2023, at Rebellion, Callihan turned on The Design by hitting Deaner with a baseball bat, thus turning face again. On the May 4 episode of Impact!, during a match between Callihan and Kon, The Design's "Army of Violence", who were clad in wearing yellow hoodies, attacked Callihan, causing a disqualification in his favour. On May 5, it was announced that Callihan will have to choose two partners to face The Design at Under Siege in a six-man tag team match. On May 15, Impact announced Rich Swann as the first of Callihan's two partners. On May 26 at Under Siege, Callihan, Swann and the returning Jake Crist defeated The Design. On June 9 at Against All Odds, oVe defeated The Design in an Ohio Street Fight.

On September 27, it was reported that Callihan is officially done with Impact Wrestling.

=== New Japan Pro-Wrestling (2017) ===
On November 6, 2017, Callihan was announced as a participant in New Japan Pro-Wrestling's 2017 World Tag League, where he would team with Juice Robinson. The team, dubbed "Death Juice", finished second in their block with a record of four wins and three losses, failing to advance to the finals.

=== Return to MLW (2024) ===
On January 6, 2024, at Kings of Colosseum, Callihan made his surprise return to MLW, helping Rickey Shane Page retain the MLW National Openweight Championship against Akira and becoming a member of The Calling. Callihan would feud with Akira, defeating him in a Death Machine Rules match at SuperFight. Callihan and Shane Page defeated Akira and Jake Crist in a New York City Street Fight at Intimidation Games. Callihan along with Shane Page, Cannonball, and Dr. Cornwallis lost to Death Fighters (Raven, Akira, Jake Crist, and Jimmy Lloyd) at War Chamber.

=== Return to Total Nonstop Action Wrestling (2024–2026) ===
On April 20, 2024, at Rebellion. Callihan made his surprise return to Total Nonstop Action Wrestling (formerly known as Impact Wrestling), to attack Kon, Jason Hotch and John Skyler helping Jordynne Grace retain her TNA Knockouts World Championship over Steph De Lander. On August 15, 2025, at Emergence, Callihan was forced to retire after losing to Mike Santana in a Baltimore Street Fight, ending his 20-year career.

After retiring from in-ring competition in August 2025, Sami Callihan remained employed by Total Nonstop Action Wrestling (TNA) in a backstage role. He has since been reported to work as Director of Live Events, a role that includes overseeing the coordination, logistics, execution of TNA's live events and television tapings, and contributes to TNA behind the scenes, drawing on his experience as a performer and creative figure within the promotion. In June 2026, Callihan announced that he had parted ways with TNA.

=== All Elite Wrestling (2026–present) ===
In July 2026, it was reported that Callihan had begun working for All Elite Wrestling (AEW) as a producer on a trial basis.

== Personal life ==
On June 20, 2021, Johnston got engaged to fellow Impact wrestler Jessicka Havok (on the latter's 35th birthday).

== Championships and accomplishments ==
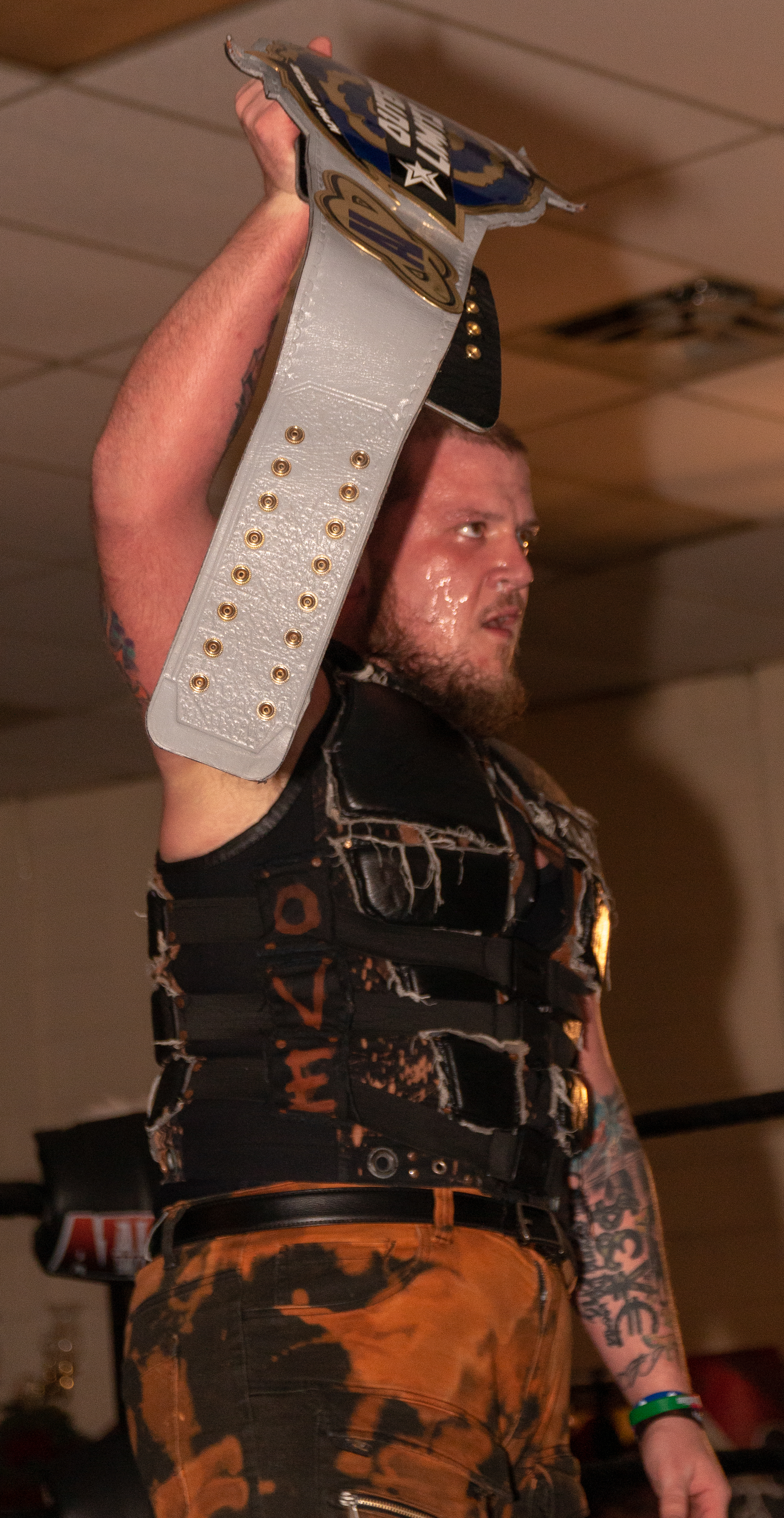
Callihan as the Alpha-1 Outer Limits Champion

- Absolute Intense Wrestling
  - AIW Tag Team Championship (1 time) – with Matt Riot
- All American Wrestling
  - AAW Heavyweight Championship (3 times)
  - Jim Lynam Memorial Tournament (2018)
- Alpha-1 Wrestling
  - A1 Outer Limits Championship (1 time)
- Combat Zone Wrestling
  - CZW Iron Man/New Horror Championship (1 time)
  - CZW Ultraviolent Underground Championship (1 time)
  - CZW World Junior Heavyweight Championship (2 times)
  - Chri$ Ca$h Memorial Battle Royal (2008)
  - CZW Best of the Best XI (2012)
- DDT Pro-Wrestling
  - KO-D Openweight Championship (1 time)
- Full Impact Pro
  - Jeff Peterson Memorial Cup (2010)
- House of Glory
  - HOG Crown Jewel Championship (1 time)
- Impact Wrestling
  - Impact World Championship (1 time)
  - Mashup Tournament (2019) – with Tessa Blanchard
  - Impact Year End Awards (5 times)
    - Match of the Year (2018) vs. Pentagon Jr. at Slammiversary XVI
    - Moment of the Year (2018) – hitting Eddie Edwards in the face with a baseball bat
    - Wrestler of the Year (2018)
    - Moment of the Year (2019) – winning the World Championship on AXS TV debut
    - Match of the Year (2019) vs. Tessa Blanchard at Slammiversary XVII
- Insanity Pro Wrestling
  - IPW World Heavyweight Championship (1 time)
  - IPW Junior Heavyweight Championship (1 time)
- FEST Wrestling
  - Love Cup (2017) – with Brian Cage
- Fight Club: PRO
  - Fight Club: PRO Championship (1 time)
- Force One Pro Wrestling
  - F1 Heavyweight Championship (1 time)
- International Wrestling Cartel
  - IWC Super Indy Championship (1 time)
  - Super Indy XI (2012)
- Jersey All Pro Wrestling
  - JAPW Tag Team Championship (1 time) – with Chris Dickinson
- Lucha Underground
  - Lucha Underground Trios Championship (1 time) – with Daga and Kobra Moon
- Maryland Championship Wrestling
  - Shamrock Cup (2011)
- NWA Force One Pro Wrestling
  - NWA Force 1 Heavyweight Championship (1 time)
- Premiere Wrestling Xperience
  - PWX Heavyweight Championship (1 time)
- Pro Wrestling 2.0
  - PW2.0 Heavyweight Championship (1 time)
- Pro Wrestling Illustrated
  - Ranked No. 52 of the top 500 singles wrestlers in the PWI 500 in 2012
- Pro Wrestling Syndicate
  - PWS Heavyweight Championship (1 time)
- Rockstar Pro Wrestling
  - Rockstar Pro World Championship (2 times)
- Squared Circle Wrestling
  - 2CW Heavyweight Championship (1 time, final)
- Westside Xtreme Wrestling
  - wXw World Tag Team Championship (1 time) – with Jon Moxley
  - 16 Carat Gold Tournament (2011)
- WrestleCircus
  - WC Sideshow Championship (1 time)

== Luchas de Apuestas record ==
Winner (wager)	Loser (wager)	Location	Event	Date	Notes
Sami Callihan (hair)	Pentagón Jr. (championship)	Berwyn, Illinois	Jim Lynam Memorial Tournament - Day 2	October 8, 2016	(Note: This was a tag team match, where Callihan and Jake Crist defeated Pentagón Jr. and Rey Fenix with Callihan winning the AAW Heavyweight Championship. Crist's career and Fenix's mask were also on the line.)
Rey Fenix (mask)	Sami Callihan (championship)	Berwyn, Illinois	Defining Moment 2017	August 31, 2017	
Pentagón Jr. (mask)	Sami Callihan (hair)	Toronto, Ontario, Canada	Slammiversary XVI	July 22, 2018	
