= Slammiversary XVII =

2019 Impact Wrestling pay-per-view event

- Promotional poster featuring Brian Cage and Michael Elgin
- Promotion: Impact Wrestling
- Date: July 7, 2019
- City: Dallas, Texas
- Venue: Gilley's Dallas
- Attendance: 1,200

Pay-per-view chronology
← Previous; Rebellion	Next → Lucha Invades NY

Slammiversary chronology
← Previous; XVI	Next → 2020

Slammiversary XVII was a professional wrestling pay-per-view (PPV) event produced by Impact Wrestling. It took place on July 7, 2019 at Gilley's Dallas in Dallas, Texas. It was the fifteenth event under the Slammiversary chronology.

Eight matches were contested at the event. In the main event, Sami Callihan defeated Tessa Blanchard in an Intergender match. In other prominent matches, Brian Cage defeated Michael Elgin to retain the Impact World Championship, Rich Swann defeated Johnny Impact to retain the Impact X Division Championship, Taya Valkyrie won a Monster's Ball match to retain the Impact Knockouts Championship, and The North (Ethan Page and Josh Alexander defeated The Latin American Xchange (Santana and Ortiz) and The Rascalz (Dezmond Xavier and Zachary Wentz) in a three-way match to retain the Impact World Tag Team Championship.

== Production ==
Other on-screen personnel
Commentators	Josh Mathews
Commentators	Don Callis
Ring announcer	Jeffery Scott
Referees	Brandon Tolle
Referees	John E. Bravo
Referees	Kris Levin
Referees	Harry Demerjian
Interviewer	Alicia Atout

=== Background ===
At Rebellion, Impact Wrestling announced the date for Slammiversary XVII, but did not announce a venue. On May 14, 2019 via its website and on social media, IMPACT Wrestling announced that the event would be held at Gilley's Dallas, and would be the first event held in Dallas.

=== Storylines ===
The event featured professional wrestling matches that involved different wrestlers from pre-existing scripted feuds and storylines. Wrestlers portrayed villains, heroes, or less distinguishable characters in scripted events that built tension and culminated in a wrestling match or series of matches.

== Reception ==
Slammiversary received widespread critical acclaim. Bob Kapur of Canoe.ca declared that "if Impact Wrestling can put great PPV shows like Slammiversary every time they go there, then they should never leave". He gave the Tessa-Sami match a perfect 10/10, Cage-Elgin 9/10, Monsters Ball Knockouts 4-way match 9/10 and the Swann-Impact match 8/10. He rated the event 9/10. He stated the match of the night – and there were many contenders for that honour – was an intergender match, Tessa-Sami with the Vile Sami Callihan and arguably the best female wrestler in any company, Tessa Blanchard. The match was historic in that it was the first intergender match to ever headline a PPV event. And what a great precedent it set. He further emphasized While that match had many hard-hitting moments, it may have been rivaled on that front by the Impact World Championship match, Cage-Elgin that saw Brian Cage defend against “Unbreakable” Michael Elgin. He gave credit to the Monsters Ball knockouts four-way match labeling it 'a good, violent affair'.

The writer of the Slammiversary report on 411 Mania, Larry Csonka, rated the event an 8 out of 10. Csonka stated that Impact Slammiversary 2019 was another good PPV from the company, with nothing bad, a great X-Division title match, Cage vs. Elgin in Impact's match of the year, and Tessa Blanchard getting a chance to shine in the main event. This was a really entertaining and easy to watch show that flew by."

Jason Powell from Pro Wrestling Dot Net praised the event stating "Overall, this was a very good pay-per-view. Impact continues to be at its best when they focus on the more traditional pro wrestling approach. He praised the main event calling it "A very good main event. Intergender wrestling isn't for everyone and I haven't been a big fan of it over the years, but they made this feel like a big deal throughout the show and the broadcast team did a nice job of putting over the effort of Blanchard and what a POS Callihan was throughout the match."

Dave Meltzer's Wrestling Observer Newsletter rated the Tessa/Sami match at 4.25 stars out of 5, Cage/Elgin match at 4.25 stars, Swann/Impact match at 4 stars and the Knockouts Monsters Ball 4-way match at 3.25 stars.

== Results ==
No.	Results	Stipulations	Times
1	Willie Mack defeated Jake Crist, TJP and Trey Miguel	X Division Four-Way match	10:00
2	The North (Ethan Page and Josh Alexander) (c) defeated The Latin American Xchange (Santana and Ortiz) (with Konnan) and The Rascalz (Dezmond Xavier and Zachary Wentz)	Three-Way match for the Impact World Tag Team Championship	7:20
3	Eddie Edwards defeated Killer Kross	First Blood match	11:30
4	Moose defeated Rob Van Dam	Singles match	13:50
5	Taya Valkyrie (c) defeated Jessicka Havok, Rosemary and Su Yung	Monster's Ball match for the Impact Knockouts Championship	11:45
6	Rich Swann (c) defeated Johnny Impact	Singles match for the Impact X Division Championship	14:55
7	Brian Cage (c) defeated Michael Elgin	Singles match for the Impact World Championship	14:10
8	Sami Callihan defeated Tessa Blanchard	Intergender match	15:00
(c) / – the champion(s) heading into the match

== See also ==
- 2019 in professional wrestling
