= Ohio Versus Everything =

Professional wrestling stable

- The stable's logo as Ohio Versus Everything from 2017–2023

Stable
- Leader(s): Jake Crist (II)
- Members: Rich Swann; Trey Miguel; Zachary Wentz
- Name(s): Ohio Is For Killers (Oi4K); Ohio Versus Everything (oVe)
- Billed from: Ohio City, Ohio
- Former members: Sami Callihan (I); Madman Fulton; Dave Crist; Dezmond Xavier; Nevaeh; Eric Ryan; Dustin Rayz; Aaron Williams; Gerome Phillips; Ron Mathis; Jon Murray
- Debut: 2012
- Years active: 2012–2020; 2023; 2026–present

Oi4K (Ohio Is For Killers; also alternatively written as Ohio Is 4 Killers) is a professional wrestling stable performing for The Wrestling Revolver. The stable consists of second leader Jake Crist, Rich Swann, Trey Miguel, and Zachary Wentz. Crist, Swann, and Miguel are the current Revolver World Tag Team Champions in their first reign as a team while Wentz is the current Revolver Remix Champion in his first reign.

The group's name was based on a majority of the members over the faction's lifespan hailing from the state of Ohio - Crist is from New Carlisle (billed from nearby Dayton), former leader Sami Callihan is from Bellefontaine (West Central Ohio), and Madman Fulton is from Toledo. On the independent circuit, Callihan and Crist (alongside Jake's brother Dave) worked together under the name Ohio Is For Killers (OI4K), which is a play on the song Ohio Is for Lovers.

== History ==
=== Combat Zone Wrestling (2011–2012; 2014–2018) ===
On April 9, 2011, Jake Crist was invited to compete in Combat Zone Wrestling's "Best Of The Best X" representing Insanity Pro Wrestling. Jake Crist would go on to lose in the first round losing against Sami Callihan in a triple threat match that also involved A. R. Fox. The next night on April 10, 2011 at CZW's "International Incident" Jake Crist would go on to wrestle Jon Moxley in Moxley's final match in CZW in another losing effort. After the match Jake would be attacked by both Moxley and Robert Anthony until Devon Moore made the save. Jake Crist returned to CZW on May 14, 2011 in a losing effort against Ryan Mcbride however fans chanted Please Come Back after the match. On June 11, 2011 at CZW "Prelude To Violence" Jake Crist was told by CZW Owner D. J. Hyde that if Crist wanted a CZW Contract then he would have to go and defeat Sami Callihan. Callihan would go on to defeat Jake Crist again. After the match both men showed respect by shaking hands. Adam Cole and Mia Yim would come down to mock Callihan. During the verbal confrontation D. J. Hyde would come out and lariat Callihan. Jake Crist would try to save Callihan but wound up attacked by D. J. Hyde. On July 9, 2011 at CZW "New Heights" A. R. Fox would offer a CZW Wired TV Championship title match to Jake Crist. Jake Crist would go on to gain his first win in CZW by defeating A. R. Fox to become the new CZW Wired TV Champion. Jake's Brother, Dave Crist would also make his CZW debut celebrating with his brother on title win.

On September 10, 2011, Jake Crist was originally supposed to defend his newly won title against Chrisjen Hayme. However, Hayme would withdraw from the match and be replaced by Dustin Rayz. Jake Crist would go on to retain against Dustin Rayz. Dave Crist though, would show more concern about his brothers TV title than in Jake Crists well-being. After the show Dustin Rayz would confront the Irish Airborne about Dave getting involved in his match against Jake. Rayz would then challenge Dave Crist at CZW "Cerebral". Dave would go one to win that match. Jake Crist successfully defended his Wired TV title against Latin Dragon earlier that night. On April 14, 2012, Dave defeated Jake with a low blow to win the CZW Wired TV Championship. Upon entering CZW, the Irish Airborne formed the Ohio is 4 Killers stable with Nevaeh and Sami Callihan.

On September 27, 2014, at Deja Vu, OI4K defeated the Juicy Product to win the CZW World Tag Team Championship. On July 11, 2015, at New Heights, OI4K lost the CZW World Tag Team Championship to Team Tremendous. In Infinity Pro Wrestling, the Crist Brothers defeated Donnie and Jacob Hollows.

=== Impact Wrestling (2017–2020) ===
Dave and Jake Crist made their Impact Wrestling debut on August 17, 2017 at Destination X, under the name Ohio Versus Everything (oVe), defeating Jason Cade and Zachary Wentz. On August 20, at Victory Road, they defeated The Latin American Xchange (Ortiz and Santana) to win the GFW World Tag Team Championship. During their reign, the championship was renamed as the Impact World Tag Team Championship. On the October 12 episode of Impact, LAX invoked their rematch clause by challenging oVe to a 5150 Street Fight at Bound for Glory.

At Bound for Glory on November 5, Sami Callihan would debut as well as establish his alliance with The Crist Brothers by helping them defeat LAX, with Jake Crist low blowing Ortiz before Callihan delivered a piledriver through a table for the win. They proceeded to attack LAX after the match, resulting in a double turn, turning heel in the process. On the January 4, 2018 episode of Impact, they lost the title to The Latin American Xchange, ending their reign at 164 days. The Crist Brothers and Callihan then formed a faction, which Madman Fulton would later join in March 2019.

On the July 19 tapings of Impact, Jake Crist defeated Rich Swann to win the Impact X Division Championship. Crist would hold the title until October 20, when at Bound For Glory, Ace Austin won it in a five-way ladder match. On October 25, Callihan would defeat Brian Cage in a steel cage match during the Impact tapings to win the Impact World Championship. Callihan held the title until January 12, 2020, when he was defeated by Tessa Blanchard at Hard to Kill.

On the April 21, 2020 episode of Rebellion Callihan had a match against Ken Shamrock. During the match the other members of OVE interfered and attacked Shamrock. Callihan than attacked them thus leaving the group. On the May 19, 2020 episode of Impact, when Dave Crist was defeated by Crazzy Steve, Madman Fulton attacked Dave Crist and Jake Crist and announced he quit OVE. Dave was released from his contract on June 26, 2020, following sexual harassment and assault allegations surfaced as part of the Speaking Out Movement. Dave Crist has never denied the allegations against him and numerous other female wrestling personalities have come forward with more sexual and physical assault allegations. Since these allegations Dave Crist has been absent from the wrestling business.

=== Reformation in Impact Wrestling (2023) ===
In 2023, Sami Callihan would begin a feud with The Design after pretending to join and then turning on the group. This would lead to a six-man tag team match at Under Siege between Sami and two partners of his choosing. Sami would join forces with Rich Swann with a mystery partner still to be confirmed which would turn out to be the returning Jake Crist with Rich and Sami wearing OVE hats and the three men cutting a promo afterward which ended with the three screaming OVE's "EVERYTHING!" catchphrase. The following week on Impact, Callihan and Crist would be referred to as OVE by themselves as well as the Impact announce team, officially confirming an official OVE reunion. Continuing to feud with The Design, Swann would declare himself unavailable to team with the two at Against All Odds due to competing in the 8-4-1 match, leaving Callihan to allude to an unnamed "monster" he would contact to team with himself and Crist. It would be revealed on the June 9, 2023 by Impact themselves that Fulton was returning and the three would be challenging the Design to an Ohio Street Fight at Against All Odds, which they won.> Fulton and Jake would later depart the company a few days later on June 21, thus ending the stable.

=== The Wrestling Revolver (2026–present) ===
On August 15, 2026 at Revolver Cage of Horrors 5, Jake Crist reformed Oi4k (the then name of the stable on the independent circuit) with Rich Swann and Trey Miguel, and defeated Tye or Die (KJ Reynolds, Ryan Matthias, and Amazonga) to win the Revolver World Tag Team Championship. On October 2 at Tales from the Ring 5, Crist introduced Zachary Wentz as the newest member of Oi4K to help defend the Revolver World Tag Team Championship in the absence of Swann, who was ill, against Tye or Die (Ryan Matthias, Amazonga, and Rory Shield) in Scaffold Warfare; Oi4K won the match and retained the title. On October 24 at the Jerry Lynn Invitational, Miguel defeated Juni Underwood, BDE, and Marcus Mathers in the first round before defeating Steve Maclin in the final to win the tournament.

== Members ==
*	Founding member(s)
I-II	Leader

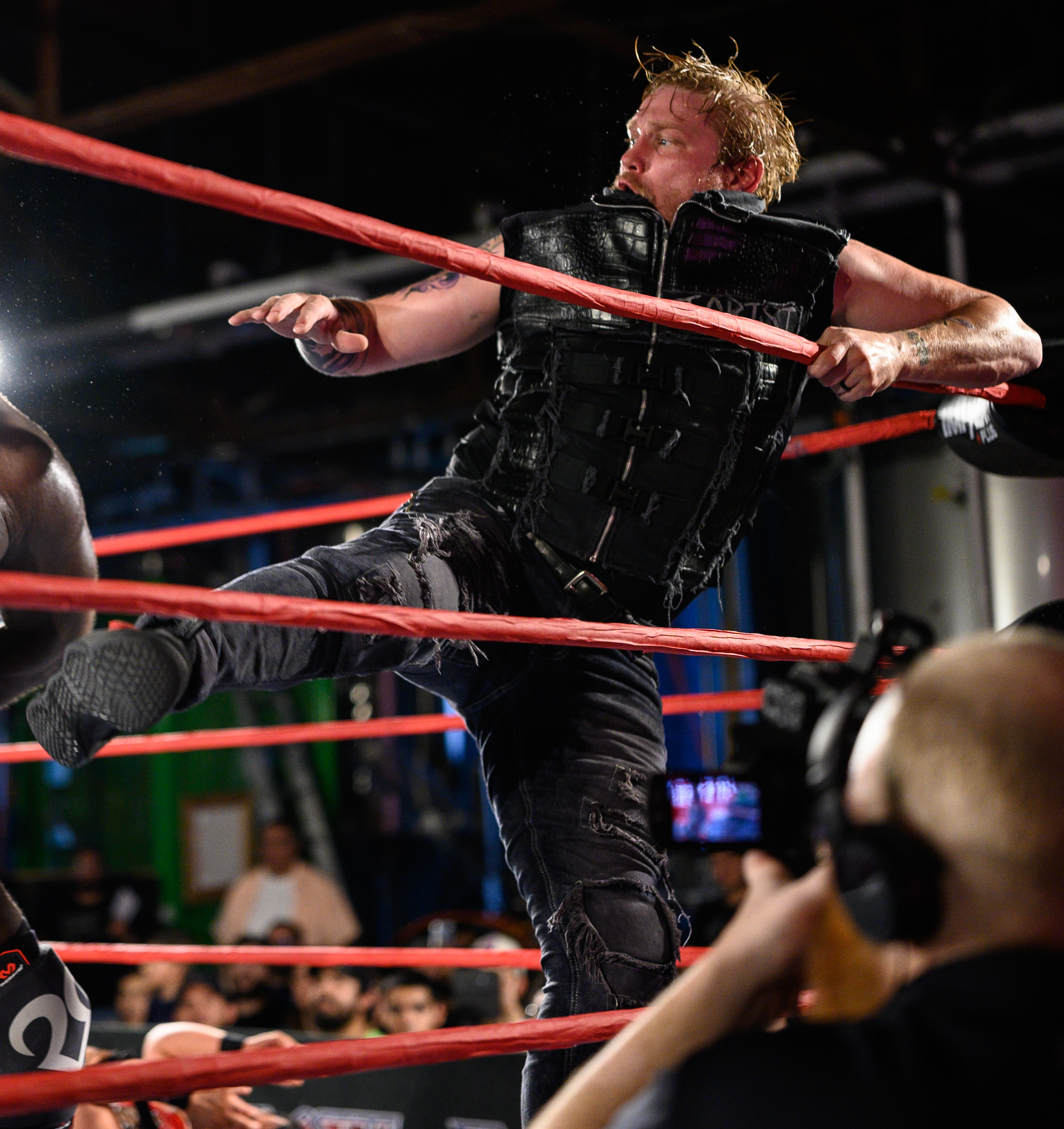
Jake Crist (II)

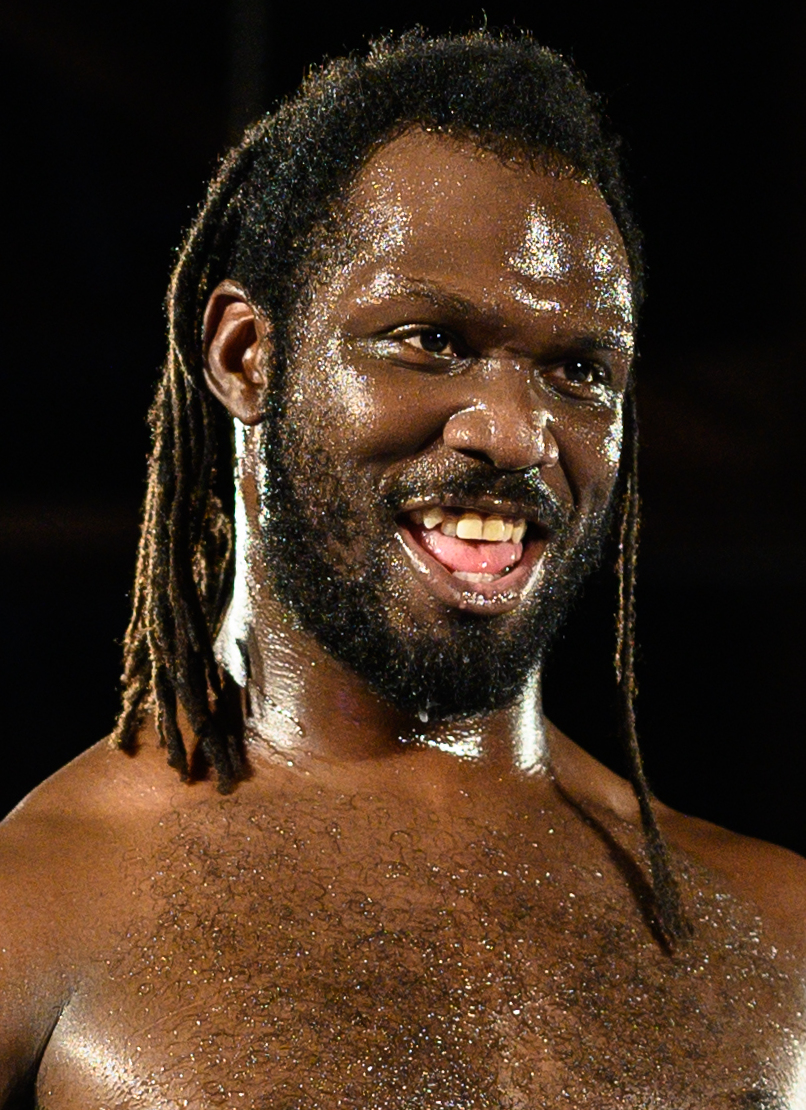
Rich Swann

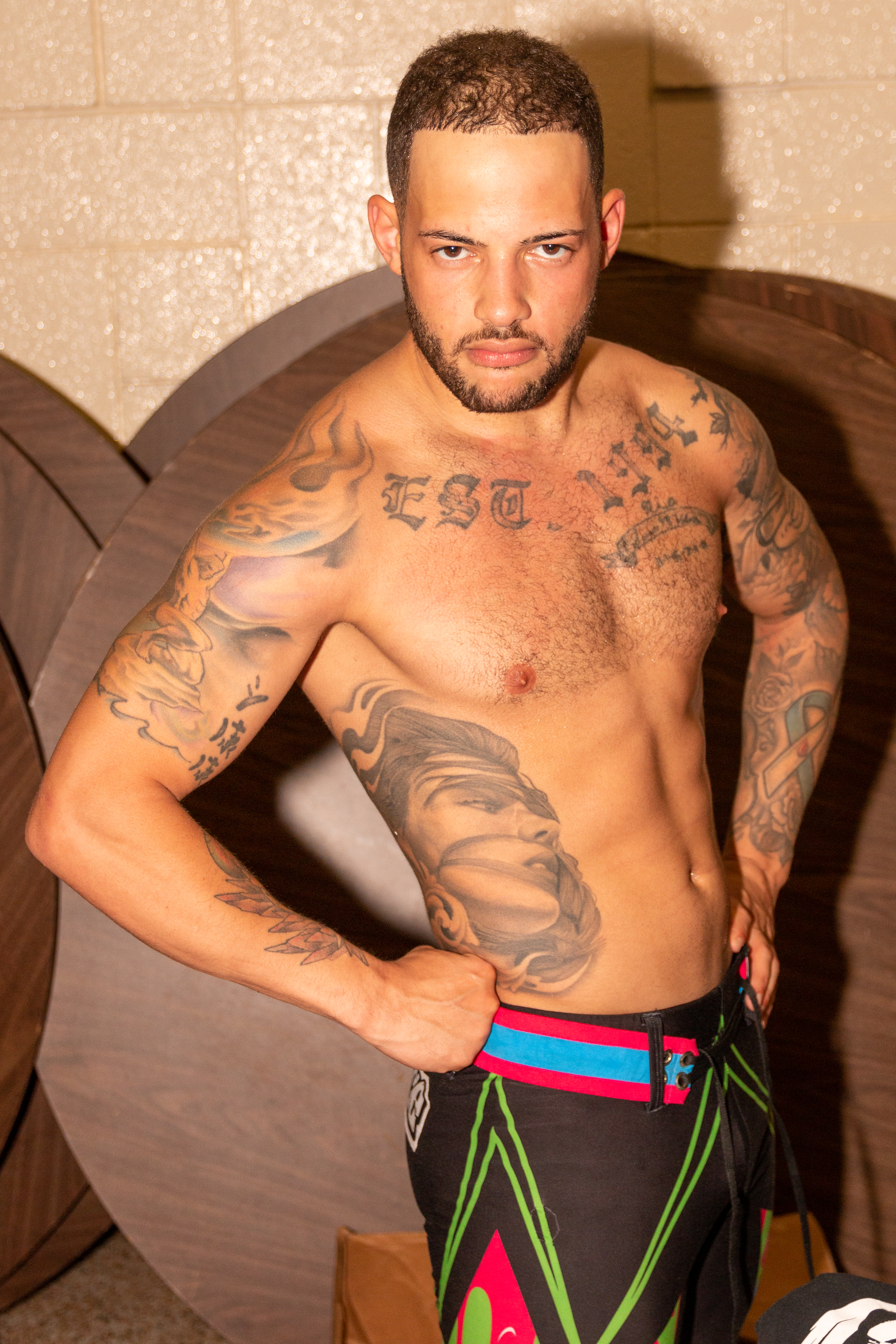
Trey Miguel

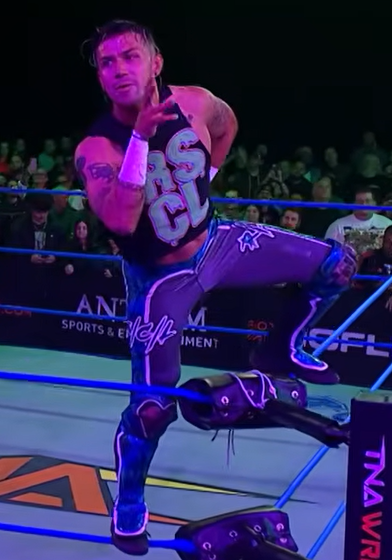
Zachary Wentz

=== Current ===
Member		Joined
Jake Crist	*II	September 8, 2012; June 1, 2023; August 15, 2026
Rich Swann		June 1, 2023; August 15, 2026
Trey Miguel		September 11, 2016; August 15, 2026
Zachary Wentz		July 22, 2015; October 2, 2026

=== Former ===
Member		Joined	Left
Sami Callihan	*I	September 8, 2012; September 5, 2017	May 27, 2013; June 21, 2023
Dave Crist	*	September 8, 2012	June 6, 2020
Nevaeh	*	September 8, 2012	June 7, 2013 (Note: Never officially left the stable. Date marks last appearance with the stable.)
Gerome Phillips		April 17, 2013	August 14, 2013
Eric Ryan		October 10, 2015	April 7, 2018
Ron Mathis		August 14, 2013	September 30, 2016
Dustin Rayz		January 7, 2015	April 7, 2018
Jon Murray		April 10, 2013	June 5, 2013
Aaron Williams		February 5, 2016	October 19, 2019
Dezmond Xavier		September 11, 2016	February 4, 2017
Madman Fulton		March 20, 2019; May 26, 2023	May 19, 2019; June 21, 2023

== Championships and accomplishments ==
- All American Wrestling
  - AAW Heavyweight Championship (3 times) – Callihan
  - AAW Tag Team Championship (4 times) – Dave and Jake
- Alpha-1 Wrestling
  - A1 Tag Team Championship (1 time)
- Absolute Intense Wrestling
  - AIW Tag Team Championship (1 time)
- American Pro Wrestling Alliance
  - APWA World Tag Team Championship (1 time)
- Combat Zone Wrestling
  - CZW World Tag Team Championship (1 time)
  - CZW Wired TV Championship (2 times) – Jake (1), Dave (1)
  - Best of the Best 16 – Dave
- Destination One Wrestling
  - D1W Tag Team Championship (1 time)
  - Harvest Cup (2014) – Dave
- Heartland Wrestling Association
  - HWA Heavyweight Championship (2 times) – Jake
  - HWA Tag Team Championship (6 times)
  - HWA Television Championship (2 times) – Lotus (Dave) (1), Crazy J (Jake) (1)
  - HWA Heartland Cup (2011) – Jake
- Impact Wrestling
  - Impact World Championship (1 time) – Callihan
  - Impact X Division Championship (1 time) – Jake
  - Impact World Tag Team Championship (1 time) – Dave and Jake
  - Mashup Tournament (2019) – Callihan and Tessa Blanchard
  - Moment of the Year (2018) – Callihan destroys Eddie Edwards' face with a baseball bat
  - Wrestler of the Year (2018) – Callihan
- Infinity Pro Reign
  - Infinity Pro Duos Championship (1 time)
- Insanity Pro Wrestling
  - IPW World Heavyweight Championship (1 time) – Jake
  - IPW Tag Team Championship (2 times)
  - IPW Junior Heavyweight Championship (5 times) – Dave (2), Jake (3)
  - IPW Super Junior Heavyweight Tournament – Dave (2004, 2006), Jake (2005)
- IWA East Coast
  - IWA East Coast Tag Team Championship (1 time)
- Independent Wrestling Association Mid-South
  - IWA Mid-South Heavyweight Championship (2 times) – Dave (1), Jake (1)
- International Wrestling Cartel
  - IWC Tag Team Championship (1 time)
- Juggalo Championship Wrestling
  - JCW Tag Team Championship (5 times)
- Northwest Ohio Wrestling
  - NOW Heavyweight Championship (1 time) – Dave
  - Glass City Tournament (2016) – Dave
- Pro Wrestling Illustrated
  - PWI ranked Jake #135 of the top 500 singles wrestlers in the PWI 500 in 2018
  - PWI ranked Dave #140 of the top 500 singles wrestlers in the PWI 500 in 2018
- Rockstar Pro Wrestling
  - Cicero Cup (2014) – Jake
  - Rockstar Pro Championship (3 times) – Jake (2), Dave (1)
  - Rockstar Pro American Luchacore Championship (1 time) – Dave
  - Rockstar Pro Tag Team Championship (2 times) – Jake and Aaron Williams (1), Jake and Ron Mathis (1)
  - Rockstar Pro Trios Championship (1 time) – Dave and Sami Callihan with Jessicka Havok
- Style Battle
  - Style Battle #1 – Dave
- The Wrestling Revolver
  - Revolver World Tag Team Championship (1 time, current) – Jake, Swann and Miguel
  - Jerry Lynn Invitational Tournament (2026) – Miguel
- Xtreme Intense Championship Wrestling
  - XICW Tag Team Championship (1 time) – Dave, Aaron Williams, Dezmond Xavier, Kyle Maverick, Trey Miguel and Zachary Wentz
