= Bash at the Brewery 2 =

2020 professional wrestling event in Texas, US

- Promotional poster featuring various Impact wrestlers
- Promotion(s): Impact Wrestling; River City Wrestling
- Date: January 10, 2020
- City: San Antonio, Texas
- Venue: Freetail Brewing Company

Impact Plus Monthly Specials chronology
| ← Previous; No Surrender | Next → Sacrifice |

Bash at the Brewery chronology
| ← Previous; 1 | Next → — |

Bash at the Brewery 2 was a professional wrestling event produced by Impact Wrestling in conjunction with River City Wrestling. It took place on January 10, 2020 at the Freetail Brewing Company in San Antonio, Texas and aired exclusively Impact Plus.

Nine professional wrestling matches were contested at the event. The main event was an eight-person elimination tag team match, in which Ohio Versus Everything (Dave Crist, Jake Crist, Madman Fulton and Sami Callihan) defeated Brian Cage, Rich Swann, Tessa Blanchard and Willie Mack. In other prominent matches on the undercard, Jordynne Grace defeated Taya Valkyrie in a Brewery Brawl and Rob Van Dam defeated Eddie Edwards while Fallah Bahh and Kiera Hogan successfully defended the RCW Heavyweight Championship and the RCW Women's Championship respectively.

== Production ==
=== Background ===
After the success of Bash at the Brewery event, Impact Wrestling and River City Wrestling announced on Twitter on December 19, 2019 that they would be reuniting to hold a second Bash at the Brewery event for Impact Plus on January 10, 2020 at the Freetail Brewing Company in San Antonio, Texas.

=== Storylines ===
The event featured wrestlers from pre-existing scripted feuds and storylines. Wrestlers portrayed villains, heroes, or less distinguishable characters in the scripted events that built tension and culminated in a wrestling match or series of matches. Storylines were played out on Impact's weekly television show.

On the October 29 episode of Impact, the team of Jordynne Grace, Rosemary and Alexia Nicole defeated the Knockouts Champion Taya Valkyrie, Madison Rayne and Kiera Hogan in a six-woman tag team match when Grace pinned Valkyrie, thus setting up a match between Grace and Valkyrie for the Knockouts Championship at Hard to Kill. A non-title match was later set for Grace and Valkyrie as a warm-up for Hard to Kill at Bash at the Brewery 2.

On the November 12 episode of Impact, Trey won a six-way match to become the #1 contender for the X Division Championship, thus setting up a match between Trey and the champion Ace Austin for the title at Hard to Kill. It was later announced that Austin would be facing Trey's The Rascalz teammate Wentz in a non-title match at Bash at the Brewery 2.

Three matches were added to the Bash at the Brewery 2 card including a first-time ever match between Eddie Edwards and Rob Van Dam, a singles match between Joey Ryan and Michael Elgin and a non-title match between the World Tag Team Champions The North and The Rascalz.

RCW title matches were announced for the event including a RCW Heavyweight Championship match between Fallah Bahh and Kongo Kong and a RCW Women's Championship match between Kiera Hogan and Christi Jaynes.

On December 24, it was announced on Twitter that Rhino would take on Shera in a match at Bash at the Brewery 2.

On the November 19 episode of Impact, Tessa Blanchard won a gauntlet match to become the #1 contender for Sami Callihan's Impact World Championship at Hard to Kill. It was later announced that Callihan would lead oVe against Blanchard, Brian Cage, Rich Swann and Willie Mack in an eight-person elimination tag team match at Bash at the Brewery.

== Event ==
=== Preliminary matches ===
The event kicked off with a match between Ace Austin and Wentz. Austin nailed a Fold on Wentz for the win.

Next, Kiera Hogan defended the RCW Women's Championship against the RCW Phoenix Champion Christi Jaynes. Hogan hit a superkick and a swinging neckbreaker on Jaynes to retain the title.

Next, Fallah Bahh defended the RCW Heavyweight Championship against Kongo Kong. After taking out Kong's manager Brandon Oliver, Bahh delivered a Samoan drop to Kong to retain the title.

Next, Joey Ryan took on Michael Elgin. Elgin nailed an Elgin Bomb to Ryan for the win. After the match, Ryan gave a "Penis Plex" to the referee.

Next, Rhino took on Shera. Near the end of the match, Rhino was about to deliver a Gore to Shera until Moose interfered in the match and attacked Rhino, which led to Shera getting disqualified.

In the following match, Eddie Edwards took on Rob Van Dam. Katie Forbes tried to interfere on the match on RVD's behalf but Eddie's wife Alisha Edwards prevented her from interfering. RVD took advantage of the distraction and hit a Van Daminator to Eddie for the win.

Later, The North (Ethan Page and Josh Alexander) took on The Rascalz (Dez and Trey). Near the end of the match, Dez attempted to hit a Final Flash but Alexander caught him and Page nailed a spinebuster to Dez for the win.

The penultimate match was a Brewery Brawl between Taya Valkyrie and Jordynne Grace. Near the end of the match, Grace hit a corner slingshot splash to Valkyrie and covered her for the pinfall but Valkyrie's manager John E. Bravo pulled the referee out before the referee could make the three-count. A scuffle took place between Grace and Bravo over the chair and the chair accidentally struck Valkyrie during the scuffle, which allowed Grace to nail a Grace Drive to Valkyrie for the win.

=== Main event ===
The main event was an eight-person elimination tag team match pitting Ohio Versus Everything (Dave Crist, Jake Crist, Madman Fulton and Sami Callihan) against the team of Brian Cage, Rich Swann, Tessa Blanchard and Willie Mack. Swann suffered a knee injury, thus causing him to be removed from the match and thus getting eliminated first. Callihan and Blanchard were next to get eliminated as they began brawling with each other after Callihan spat on her and they brawled to the backstage and were counted out. Cage would then eliminate Dave by delivering a Drill Claw to Dave. Fulton then eliminated Cage after a diving headbutt from the middle rope. Mack then nailed a stunner to Jake to eliminate him. Fulton executed a lifting reverse STO to Mack to eliminate him and win the match for oVe.

== Reception ==
Larry Csonka of 411Mania reviewed the event and gave it a 6.2 out of 10, which was higher than last year's event that got a 5.9 out of 10. He praised it for being "an overall solid event" and appreciated the "lively crowd" which the viewer "could actually hear". He further added: "There was nothing must-see and it was a little low energy at times two days ahead of the PPV, which is understandable, but a solid sub-three hour event overall."

== Aftermath ==
Most of the matches on the event would lead to Hard to Kill, where Ace Austin successfully defended the X Division Championship against Trey, Taya Valkyrie successfully defended the Knockouts Championship against Jordynne Grace and ODB in a three-way match, Rob Van Dam versus Brian Cage ended in a no contest due to Cage suffering an injury and Van Dam going on to defeat Cage's replacement Daga, Eddie Edwards defeated Michael Elgin to retain his Call Your Shot Trophy, Moose defeated Rhino in a no disqualification match, The North retained the World Tag Team Championship against Willie Mack in a handicap match and Tessa Blanchard defeated Sami Callihan to win the Impact World Championship.

Rich Swann underwent ankle surgery to fix an Achilles injury and was out for several months. He would make his return in July at Slammiversary as one of the mystery opponents in an elimination match for the vacant Impact World Championship, eliminating Eric Young before he attacked him by re-injuring his ankle with a steel chair. On the August 4 episode of Impact!, he announced his (kayfabe) retirement from wrestling due to the injury, and was attacked by Young again as he exited the arena. Swann would go on to defeat Young for the Impact World Championship at Bound for Glory.

== Results ==
| No. | Results | Stipulations | Times |
|---|---|---|---|
| 1 | Ace Austin defeated Wentz by pinfall | Singles match | 10:32 |
| 2 | Kiera Hogan (c) defeated Christi Jaynes by pinfall | Singles match for the RCW Women's Championship | 07:11 |
| 3 | Fallah Bahh (c) defeated Kongo Kong (with Brandon Oliver and Madi Wrenkowski) by pinfall | Singles match for the RCW Heavyweight Championship | 08:08 |
| 4 | Michael Elgin defeated Joey Ryan by pinfall | Singles match | 14:00 |
| 5 | Rhino defeated Shera by disqualification | Singles match | 06:31 |
| 6 | Rob Van Dam (with Katie Forbes) defeated Eddie Edwards by pinfall | Singles match | 11:46 |
| 7 | The North (Ethan Page and Josh Alexander) defeated The Rascalz (Dez and Trey) by pinfall | Tag team match | 10:50 |
| 8 | Jordynne Grace defeated Taya Valkyrie (with John E. Bravo) by pinfall | Brewery Brawl | 12:38 |
| 9 | Ohio Versus Everything (Dave Crist, Jake Crist, Madman Fulton and Sami Callihan) defeated Brian Cage, Rich Swann, Tessa Blanchard and Willie Mack by pinfall | Eight-person elimination tag team match | 28:29 |
(c) / – the champion(s) heading into the match
