= Impact Wrestling Sacrifice (2022) =

2022 Impact Wrestling event

Sacrifice
- Promotional poster featuring Moose and Heath
- Promotion: Impact Wrestling
- Date: March 5, 2022
- City: Louisville, Kentucky
- Venue: Old Forester's Paristown Hall

Impact Plus Monthly Specials chronology
← Previous; No Surrender	Next → Under Siege

Sacrifice chronology
← Previous; 2021	Next → 2023

The 2022 Sacrifice was a professional wrestling event produced by Impact Wrestling. It took place on March 5, 2022, at Old Forester's Paristown Hall in Louisville, Kentucky, and aired on Impact Plus and YouTube. It was the 13th event under the Sacrifice chronology.

Twelve matches were contested at the event, including two on the Countdown to Sacrifice pre-show and one taped as a digital exclusive. In the main event, Moose defeated Heath to retain the Impact World Championship. In other prominent matches, Violent By Design (Eric Young and Joe Doering) defeated The Good Brothers (Doc Gallows and Karl Anderson) to win the Impact World Tag Team Championship, Tasha Steelz defeated Mickie James to win the Impact Knockouts World Championship, and The Influence (Madison Rayne and Tenille Dashwood) defeated The IInspiration (Cassie Lee and Jessie McKay) to win the Impact Knockouts World Tag Team Championship. The event also marked the return of Alex Shelley, facing his student and Bullet Club leader Jay White in a losing effort.

The event garnered positive reviews from critics, with much praise being directed to the X Division title match between Jake Something and Trey Miguel.

== Production ==
=== Background ===
Sacrifice was an annual professional wrestling pay-per-view (PPV) event produced by Impact Wrestling (then known as Total Nonstop Action Wrestling) that was first held in August 2005. The promotion's PPV schedule was reduced to four quarterly events in 2013, dropping Sacrifice. The event would return in 2014 and in 2016, the latter as a special edition of Impact!. The event would be revived in 2020 as a monthly special for Impact Plus.

On December 24, 2021, Impact Wrestling announced that Sacrifice would take place at Old Forester's Paristown Hall in Louisville, Kentucky on March 5, 2022.

=== Storylines ===
The event featured several professional wrestling matches that involved different wrestlers from pre-existing scripted feuds, plots, and storylines. Storylines were produced on Impact Wrestling's weekly television programs: Impact! and Before the Impact.

The Influence (Madison Rayne and Tenille Dashwood) were originally slated to challenge The IInspiration (Cassie Lee and Jessie McKay) for the Impact Knockouts Tag Team Championship at Hard To Kill in January 2022. However, the match was cancelled due to The IInspiration having come into contact with someone who tested positive for COVID-19. On February 22, it was announced that the title match will now take place at Sacrifice. The Influence questioned Kaleb with a K's allegiance to them ever since he received a new phone from The IInspiration, and started losing matches through a call from said phone and Kaleb being distracted with McKay in his arms.

At No Surrender, Jake Something defeated Ace Austin, Chris Bey, and Mike Bailey in a four-way match to become the number one contender to the Impact X Division Championship. On February 23, it was announced that Something will challenge defending champion Trey Miguel at Sacrifice.

At No Surrender, Honor No More (Matt Taven, Mike Bennett, Kenny King, PCO, and Vincent) defeated Team Impact (Chris Sabin, Rhino, Rich Swann, Steve Maclin, and Willie Mack) to earn their right to stay in Impact Wrestling, after the latter team was betrayed by Eddie Edwards. Edwards was found to be attacked backstage before the match, forcing Mack to take his place. However, Edwards would return during the match's climax and attacked Rhino and the rest of Team Impact before allowing King pin Rhino; turning heel and joining Honor No More in the process. Edwards would explain his actions on the February 24 episode of Impact!; after Kenny Omega won the Impact World Championship in a cross-promotional match at Rebellion in 2021, Edwards waited be chosen by Impact management to challenge for the title and "restore honor" to the company. Instead, it was Moose and Sami Callihan who both challenged and failed to beat Omega over the Summer. Feeling betrayed by Impact Wrestling (as well as by Ring of Honor, a company Edwards once wrestled for, going on a hiatus and releasing members of Honor No More from their contracts), Edwards would cost Team Impact the match at No Surrender. During that week's episode, Impact Executive Vice President Scott D'Amore would book a match between Rhino and Edwards for Sacrifice. Meanwhile, Jonah would be booked to face Honor No More's PCO. On March 2, it was announced that Swann and Mack will face Honor No More's Matt Taven and Mike Bennett on the "Countdown to Sacrifice" pre-show.

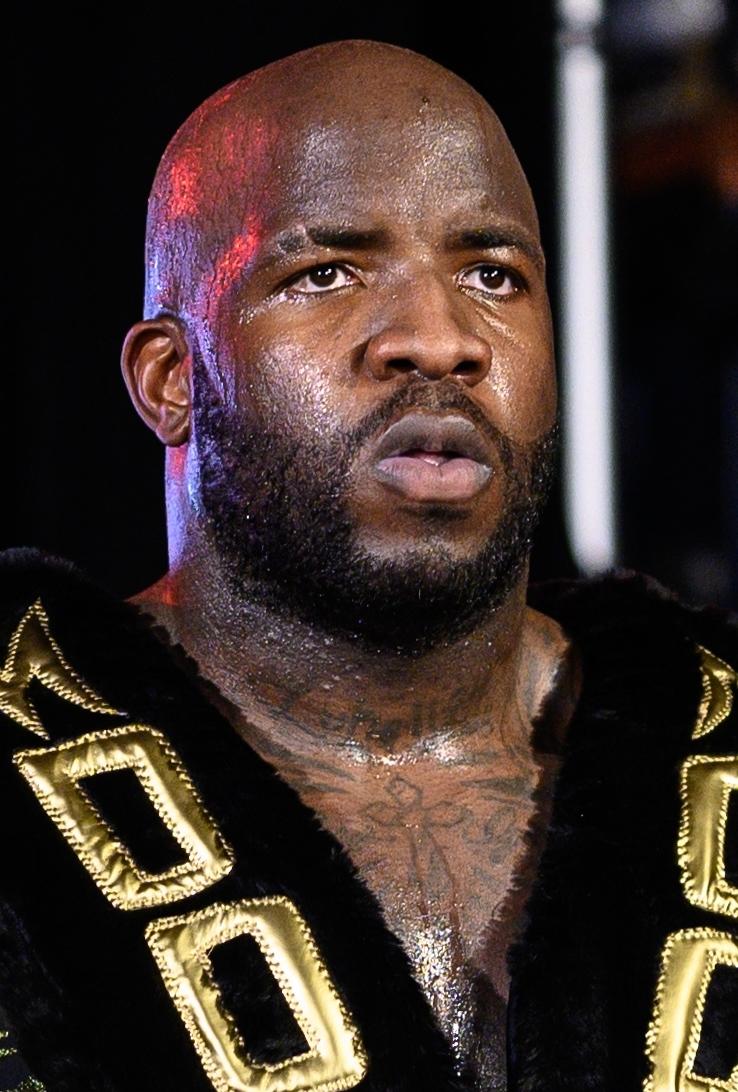
Moose entered Sacrifice as Impact World Champion.

At No Surrender, Moose retained the Impact World Championship against W. Morrissey. On the February 24 episode of Impact!, Moose would take credit for Eddie Edwards' recent actions, citing how those he defeated and retained the title against (including Josh Alexander and Matt Cardona) had gone through downward spirals. Moose would then be interrupted by Heath, who was returning after the initial assault by Honor No More, and be challenged for the Impact World Championship at Sacrifice. Scott D'Amore, bewildered that Moose had no issue with Honor No More as long as they "stayed away" from his championship, officially booked a title match between Moose and Heath during a backstage segment.

At No Surrender, The Good Brothers (Doc Gallows and Karl Anderson) successfully retained the Impact World Tag Team Championship against the Guerillas of Destiny (Tama Tonga and Tanga Loa) after the latter team was betrayed by Bullet Club leader Jay White. Subsequently, Guerillas of Destiny (G.O.D.) was kicked out of Bullet Club and White reinstated The Good Brothers as members for the first time in nearly a decade. On the February 24 episode of Impact!, White announced that he would be facing his mentor, Alex Shelley, at Sacrifice. During the segment, Violent By Design (Eric Young, Deaner, and Joe Doering), who had been in a partnership with The Good Brothers, confronted the Bullet Club backstage. After White denied Violent By Design (VBD)'s request for a title match, G.O.D. would ambush the Bullet Club. It was later announced that The Good Brothers will defend the Impact World Tag Team Championship against VBD at Sacrifice.

At No Surrender, Mickie James defeated Tasha Steelz to retain the Impact Knockouts World Championship. On the following episode of Impact!, Steelz and her bodyguard Savannah Evans burst into executive producer Gail Kim's office, who was in talks with James and Chelsea Green about a title match at Sacrifice. Steelz objected to the idea, so Kim booked a number one contender's match for next week between Green and Steelz. Steelz would win the match, earning her another title opportunity against James at Sacrifice.

On the February 10 episode of Before the Impact, Lady Frost defeated Alisha Edwards. However, Frost's celebration would be cut short due to the debuting Gisele Shaw, who came down to the ring and ignored Frost entirely. The two would square off in a match the following week, where Shaw would pick up the victory. On the February 24 episode of Impact!, Frost answered Deonna Purrazzo's "Champ-Champ" open challenge, attempting to take Purrazzo's AAA Reina de Reinas Championship, but came up short. After the match, Shaw came down again, staring at Purrazzo before mocking Frost on her failure. The next week, when Shaw interrupted Purrazzo's interview time, Frost confronted Shaw to let her know that the two of them would have a rematch on the "Countdown to Sacrifice" pre-show.

== Event ==
Other on-screen personnel
Commentators	Tom Hannifan
Commentators	Matthew Rehwoldt
Commentators	Anthony Carelli (Main event)
Commentators	Maria Kanellis-Bennett (Pre-show; Swann and Mack vs. Honor No More)
Ring announcer	David Penzer
Referees	Brian Hebner
Referees	Brandon Tolle
Referees	Daniel Spencer
Interviewer	Gia Miller

=== Digital Media Exclusive Match ===
Before the event went live, Mike Bailey defeated Aiden Prince which was aired as an Impact Digital Exclusive on March 8.

=== Countdown to Sacrifice ===
Two matches were contested on the Countdown to Sacrifice pre-show. In the first match, Gisele Shaw fought against Lady Frost. In the end, Frost hit the "Frostbite" to get the victory.

In the second pre-show match, Rich Swann and Willie Mack took on Honor No More (Matt Taven and Mike Bennett). Maria Kanellis-Bennett joined Tom Hannifan and Matthew Rehwoldt on commentary. In the end, Swann rolled up Bennett to get the win for his team.

=== Preliminary matches ===
The opening match of the event was Jake Something against Trey Miguel for the X Division Championship. Jake puts Trey down the mat after a lockup, who lands some strikes but gets back down with a few clotheslines. Trey begins to target Jake's arm but gets caught in a powerbomb for two. Jake remains in control after whipping Trey in the corner followed by a punch that sends him to the ground. Trey fights back with a couple strikes and an elbow, but Jake knocks him down with a forearm followed by a spear in the corner for a two count. Jake hits some clotheslines on Trey, who answers back with forearms in the corner and a springboard splash. Trey misses two kicks on Jake but hits a back kick for two. Trey lands some chops on Jake who sends him into the mat and hits a backbreaker for two. Jake hits Trey with two clotheslines against the ropes, but gets kicked to the outside, and planted with a Destroyer on the ramp. Trey rolls Jake into the ring for a two count, applies an armbar immediately afterwards, but gets powerbombed into the turnbuckle and on the mat for two. Jake goes for another powerbomb but Trey counters it into a meteora for a two count. Trey climbs to the top rope but gets punched by Jake who follows him up, slips out of a superplex attempt to hit a few strikes, and lands another meteora on Jake for three to retain his title.

Next, Eddie Edwards (with Honor No More) took on Rhino (with Chris Sabin, Rich Swann, and Willie Mack). Edwards charges at Rhino who avoids him, landing punches and chops that forces Edwards to go outside and regroup with Honor No More. Rhino continues to lay Edwards with punches and chops, before Edwards lands some chops of his own, and gets thrown outside near Team Impact who send him back into the ring. Edwards catches Rhino with a boot and attempts to get a kendo stick from Maria Kanellis-Bennett, but she gets caught by the referee who ejects her from ringside. Rhino comes back with some punches on Edwards, who hits a few elbows in return, but gets taken down with a punch. Matt Taven trips Rhino from the outside, allowing Edwards to choke him on the ropes, giving Taven a chance to choke Rhino as well. Edwards punches Rhino to the corner and hits a running forearm, but gets caught with a clothesline followed by a shoulderblock in the corner. Honor No More and Team Impact begin brawling at ringside, with Vincent, Swann and Mack landing dives on everybody outside. Steve Maclin enters the ring and lands a DDT on Edwards, encourages Rhino to hit the "Gore", but hits him with a kendo stick. Edwards hits the "Boston Knee Party" for the win.

Backstage, Kaleb with a K asked The Influence (Madison Rayne and Tenile Dashwood) if they were ready for tonight, who respond by telling him to not be at ringside for their match. The third match was The Influence versus The IInspiration (Cassie Lee and Jessie McKay) for the Knockouts World Tag Team Championship. Jessie gets the early advantage on Tenille which forces her to tag Madison in, who gets double teamed by Cassie and Jessie. Cassie and Madison trade multiple pin attempts, followed by Cassie applying an armlock on Madison. Both teams were in the ring, with The Influence mocking The IInspiration's pose and getting sent outside the ring. Tenille drops Cassie face-first into the apron, while Madison throws Jessie into the ring post. Back in the ring, The Influence continue the double team assault on Jessie, resulting in the latter being put in the tree of woe in their corner. Jessie tags in Cassie and takes out The Influence, hitting a fisherman suplex on Tenille for two. The IInspiration attempt to hit "The Idolizer" on Tenille, who manages to escape but gets driven into Jessie's knee instead. Tenille escapes a double suplex attempt by The IInspiration and hits the "Spotlight Kick" on Cassie for a near fall. Kaleb arrives at ringside, Cassie hits a spin kick on Tenille for two, and both teams fight in the ring. Kaleb throws one of the belts in the ring, which is picked up by Tenille who hits Cassie with it, and pins her to win the tag titles for her team.

Heath and Rhino talk backstage about Steve Maclin's betrayal on Team Impact and Heath's upcoming title match. Anthony Carelli walks up to Heath and gives him a pep talk about being the underdog and being ready against Moose. Brian Myers is at ringside to provide alternative commentary from his own announce table, but W. Morrissey arrives to powerbomb Myers on his table, who manages to escape. Morrissey then hits the "BQE" on one of the security guards through the table.

The fourth match involved Jonah against Honor No More's PCO. The two start trading punches with each other, PCO getting the advantage with a running dropkick to the back of Jonah's head, sending him outside. They continue to trade blows as PCO sends Jonah face-first into the ring post. Jonah hits PCO with a side Russian legsweep on the ramp. Back in the ring, Jonah delivers multiple chops to PCO, who demands more and hits Jonah with chops of his own. PCO clotheslines Jonah over the top rope and lands a dive through the ropes that sends Jonah to the floor. PCO puts Jonah on the apron, climbs to the top rope, and hits the "De-Animator" on him. PCO goes back up top but Jonah follows him to hit a superplex. Both men trade forearms and hit a German suplex on each other. Jonah clotheslines PCO then hits a DDT and a suplex, both times PCO manages to get up but Jonah lands a superkick to send him back down. Jonah climbs to the top rope, but PCO catches him and delivers a hurricanrana followed by the "PCO-sault" for two. Jonah rolls outside as PCO follows him, leading to the former sending him to the steel steps, hitting a piledriver on them and a powerbomb on the floor. Jonah sends PCO back into the ring and hits the "Tsunami" on the back of his head for the win. Medical officials arrive to help PCO, who pushes them away.

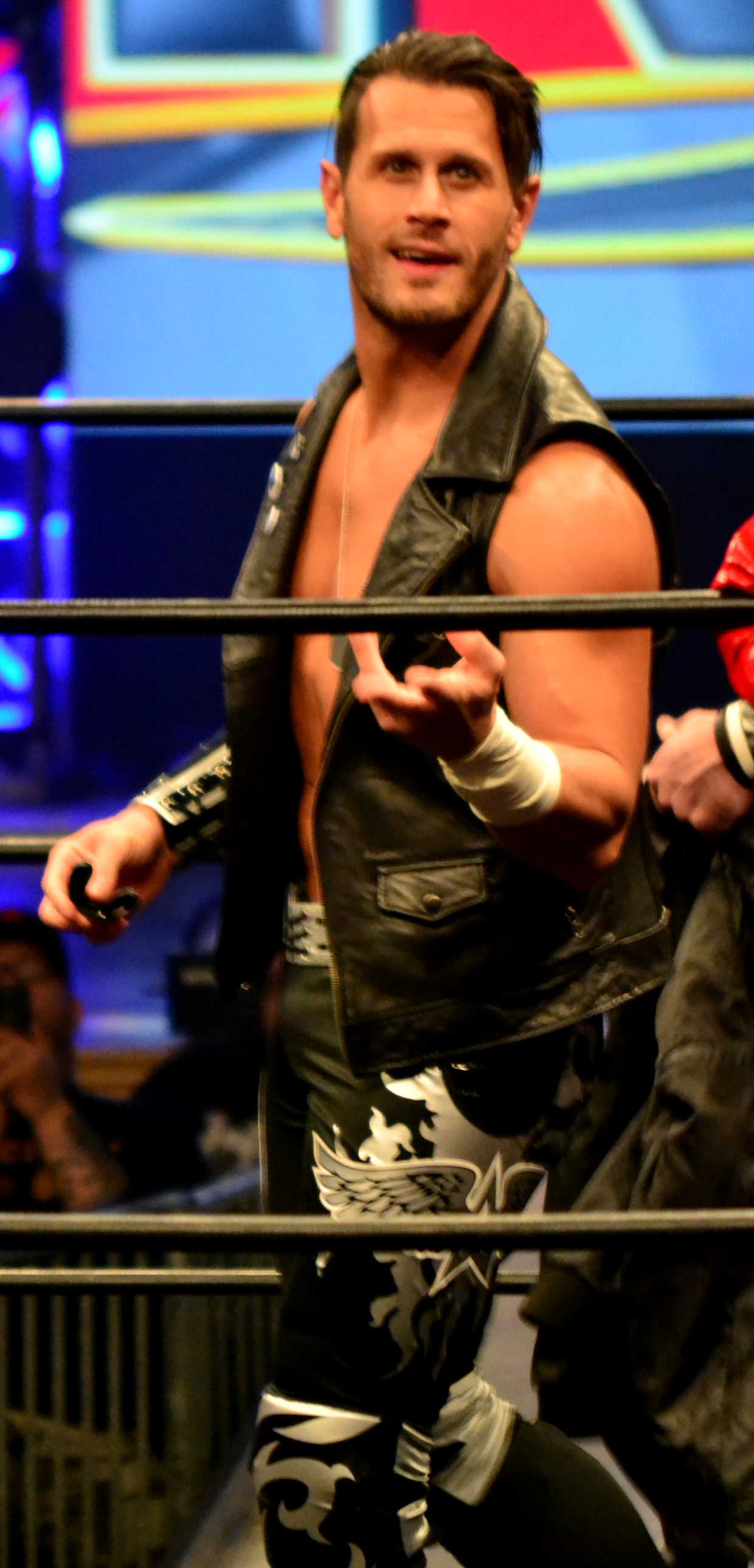
Alex Shelley made his return to Impact Wrestling at Sacrifice.

The fifth match saw Bullet Club leader Jay White against Alex Shelley. After some standing go-behind switches between the two, Shelley applies a headlock that White escapes by pulling the hair, with Shelley regaining control with a drop toe hold and works on the arm. White hits a back elbow to Shelley's ear and the two trade punches and chops in the corner. Shelley hits White with a back elbow and lands a knee to his arm. White rolls out of the ring and avoids a baseball slide from Shelley, but gets tripped by him who lands an elbow on his throat and a knee to the back of his head. Shelley goes for a slingshot crossbody but White gets his knees up. White hits a backbreaker on Shelley and sends him outside by dropping his neck on the top rope. White drives Shelley into the apron three times and sends him back in the ring to deliver chops. White whips Shelley into the corner and hits a back elbow followed by a pumhandle backbreaker for two. Shelley fights back with a running forearm and a series of kicks, but White retakes control with a DDT. White hits Shelley with an uppercut in the corner and a twisting suplex for two. Shelley sends White's face into the middle turnbuckle, but White lands a thumb into Shelley's eye, and the two exchange chops with each other. White hits an uranage and goes for the pin, but Shelley gets his foot on the rope. Shelley lands a sliced bread on White for a near fall. Shelley goes for a "Blade Runner" attempt that White escapes from, but gets kicked in the back for a two count, and Shelley locks in the "Border City Stretch" that White breaks by finding the ropes. Shelley works on White's arm and hits an enzuigiri that sends him to the outside. Shelley goes for a springboard crossbody, but White catches him to hit the "Blade Runner" into the apron. Back in the ring, Shelley counters White's "Blade Runner" with his own for a two count and reapplies the "Border City Stretch". White gets up and hits Shelley with the "Blade Runner" for the win. As the fans and announce team give a standing ovation after the match, Shelley offers White a handshake, who laughs it off and leaves the ring, mocking him on the ramp.

Next, Deonna Purrazzo entered the ring to start the "Champ-Champ" open challenge. Chelsea Green appeared and picked the ROH Women's World Championship to be on the line. The two tie up and trade the advantage before Green catches Purrazzo with an arm drag and a dive to the outside on the ramp. Back in the ring, Purrazzo clotheslines Green to the floor, and chokes her over the rope. Purrazzo hits Green with a running knee, a Russian legsweep, and applies the Fujiwara armbar, which Green escapes out of before getting clotheslined back down for a two count. Green fights back but Purrazzo lands a pump kick, with Green answering back with double knees and a sunset flip for two. They begin trading near falls before Purrazzo locks in the armbar, with Green escaping and the two booting each other to the mat. Green hits Purrazzo with a dropkick and a clothesline, sends her into the middle turnbuckle and drives her face into the bottom turnbuckle for a two count. Green sends Purrazzo face-first into the mat and goes to the top rope, but Purrazzo avoids it and suplexes Green for two before going back to the armbar. Green counters Purrazzo's armbar with her own, but manages to reach the ropes. Purrazzo goes after Green's left wrist, who writhes in pain as the referee checks on her. Purrazzo shows concern for Green who pushes her away, causing Purrazzo to lock in the Fujiwara armbar and retain the title by submission. Purrazzo continues to apply the hold, before Impact Knockouts World Champion Mickie James chases her off and checks on Green. Tasha Steelz makes her way to the ring for the upcoming match.

The seventh match involved Mickie James defending the Knockouts World Championship against Tasha Steelz (with Savannah Evans). Steelz attacked James before the bell rang, and continued the early advantage before James stomped Steelz in the corner. James applied a Boston crab on Steelz as Evans went after Green being attended to by medical officials at ringside. James ran down Evans but Steelz used that distraction to land a dive on the floor. Steelz sent James into the ring steps and back in the ring for a two count. James and Steelz traded chops with each other, the latter regaining control with a running uppercut in the corner, a snapmare and a kick for two. Steelz applied a Camel clutch on James who escapes out of it with a backpack stunner. The two trade shots on the top rope before tumbling down on the floor. Back in the ring, they exchange punches before James lands a Thesz press on Steelz, followed by a series of clotheslines and a neckbreaker for two. Steelz avoids the "Mick Kick", but gets hit with the "Mick-DT" as Evans enters the ring to distract the referee. James boots Evans out of the ring, leaving her open for Steelz to hit the "Blackout Crucifix Bomb" for two. They trade punches before James takes Steelz out with an elbow and a hurricanrana. Steelz sends James into the middle turnbuckle, goes for a Stratusfaction attempt, but James counters it and hits a flapjack. Steelz distracts the referee as James goes to the top rope, allowing Evans to grab her leg before getting kicked off. Steelz catches James with a mid-air cutter for the win and the title.

The penultimate match saw The Good Brothers (Doc Gallows and Karl Anderson) (with Chris Bey) defending the Impact World Tag Team Championship against Violent By Design (Eric Young and Joe Doering) (with Deaner). Anderson and Young start the match by trading arm drags and armlocks with each other. Both of them tag their respective partners with Doering hitting a big boot on Gallows. After trading shoulderblocks, Gallows knocks Doering out with a pump kick for one, followed by some elbows and a chin lock. The two run into each other and fall to the mat. Anderson and Young get tagged in, the former laying some offense on the latter, and landing a senton on him. Anderson hits a fisherman buster for two, goes for a back suplex but Young escapes and tags Doering, who lays Anderson out and tags Young back in to hit a top rope elbow drop for two. Anderson back drops Young and tags Gallows in, who cleans house on Young and Doering before tagging Anderson back in to hit a double team neckbreaker for two. Gallows tags in, slams Young to the mat for a two count, and knocks Doering off the apron. The Good Brothers go for a "Magic Killer" attempt, but Young escapes and sends Gallows to the outside, tagging in Doering who lays out Anderson with a Death Valley driver and clothesline combo, followed by a suplex from Young for a near fall. Gallows stops Young on the top rope, follows Anderson on the middle rope, and Doering takes them out with a Tower of Doom. Doering drags Young to his corner to make the tag, Anderson fights him off with some strikes and lands a spinebuster, but Doering gets back up to deliver a clothesline. Gallows and Young fight on the stage, the latter hitting a low blow on the former, and taking him out with a piledriver. Doering and Young hit a powerbomb-neckbreaker combo on Anderson to win the tag titles.

=== Main event ===
In the main event, Moose defended the Impact World Championship against Heath. Anthony Carelli joined Hannifan and Rehwoldt on commentary. Heath lands some punches early in the match, but Moose drives him into the corner and buries his shoulder into Heath's midsection, throwing him across the ring afterwards. Moose hard whips Heath into the turnbuckle and throws him across the ring, rips his shirt to deliver a chop to his chest, but Heath fires back with a flurry of moves that goes to the outside. Moose boots Heath to the floor, throws him into the ring post, and sends him into the ring steps. Moose breaks the referee's count and sends Heath back in the ring, stomping on his hands and right ankle, and chops him back down to stomp on his head. Moose applies an abdominal stretch on Heath, and rams his elbow to the ribs. Heath escapes by biting Moose's hand but gets punched down, and is sent to the outside for Moose to hit a pair of uranages on the apron. Back in the ring, Moose stands on Heath for a two count, slaps him and trash talks into his face, but Heath fights back to send Moose to the outside and hit a springboard crossbody on the floor. Heath rolls up Moose for two, and hits the "Wake Up Call" for another two count. Moose lays Heath down with a uranage and hits the spear to retain his title.

After the match, Josh Alexander appears and takes out Moose with the "C4 Spike". Alexander explained that Scott D'Amore sent him home to get his emotions in check, and it was the right thing D'Amore did for him, allowing Alexander to spend time with his family and be a mile away from Anthem's corporate office. Alexander revealed that he signed a new multi-year contract with Impact Wrestling and will face Moose at Rebellion in the main event for the Impact World Championship.

== Reception ==
Steve Cook of 411Mania gave the event a 7.5 out of 10, which was the same rating as last year's event. He gave praise to the X-Division title match, Jonah-PCO and White-Shelley as the event's highlights, calling it a "Pretty solid outing from the Impact folks tonight ... we got some interesting title changes and Josh Alexander is back to be the workhorse of the company. Can't complain about that." Darrin Lilly of PWTorch praised the X-Division title opener, Jonah-PCO for being "a hard hitting match", and highlighted White-Shelley as "standout [match] of the night". He called it: "[A]n excellent show from top to bottom. The crowd was enthusiastic and engaged all the way through. There was a little of everything on this from brawling to high flying to technical wrestling." Bob Kapur of Slam Wrestling praised Something-Miguel for being "a good clash of quickness and aerials vs. smashmouth power", criticized White-Shelley for going "too long" and lacking a "smooth flow" to their bout, and felt the Impact World Title main event carried "a very old-school feel, almost like an old 80s house show match." He rated the event 4.5 out of 5 stars, concluding that: "Impact put on another strong show with some very good in-ring action throughout. Combine the eventful results with the solid performances, and Sacrifice was one definitely worth watching.

== Aftermath ==
Two days later, Jake Something announced on his Twitter account that he is no longer with Impact Wrestling. Something would make his return to the company at Slammiversary in July 2023.

On March 8, Impact Wrestling announced that Trey Miguel will defend the Impact X Division Championship in a three-way match at Rebellion, with two other three-way matches to take place on following episodes of Impact! to determine his challengers.

On the March 24 episode of Impact!, Tasha Steelz ended her feud with Mickie James by successfully defending the Impact Knockouts World Championship in a Street Fight.

== Results ==
No.	Results	Stipulations	Times
1^{D}	Mike Bailey defeated Aiden Prince by pinfall	Singles match (Note: The match was taped for an Impact Digital Exclusive that aired on March 8.)	3:48
2^{P}	Lady Frost defeated Gisele Shaw by pinfall	Singles match	6:04
3^{P}	Rich Swann and Willie Mack defeated Honor No More (Matt Taven and Mike Bennett) (with Maria Kanellis-Bennett) by pinfall	Tag team match	7:45
4	Trey Miguel (c) defeated Jake Something by pinfall	Singles match for the Impact X Division Championship	11:03
5	Eddie Edwards (with Honor No More) defeated Rhino (with Chris Sabin, Rich Swann, and Willie Mack) by pinfall	Singles match	8:44
6	The Influence (Madison Rayne and Tenille Dashwood) defeated The IInspiration (Cassie Lee and Jessie McKay) (c) by pinfall	Tag team match for the Impact Knockouts World Tag Team Championship	10:30
7	Jonah defeated PCO by pinfall	Singles match	11:30
8	Jay White defeated Alex Shelley by pinfall	Singles match	18:45
9	Deonna Purrazzo (c) defeated Chelsea Green by submission	Singles match for the ROH Women's World Championship	8:18
10	Tasha Steelz (with Savannah Evans) defeated Mickie James (c) by pinfall	Singles match for the Impact Knockouts World Championship	14:06
11	Violent By Design (Eric Young and Joe Doering) (with Deaner) defeated The Good Brothers (Doc Gallows and Karl Anderson) (c) (with Chris Bey) by pinfall	Tag team match for the Impact World Tag Team Championship	11:44
12	Moose (c) defeated Heath by pinfall	Singles match for the Impact World Championship	12:09
(c) / – the champion(s) heading into the match; D / – this was a dark match; P / – the match was broadcast on the pre-show
