= Bash at the Brewery =

Impact Wrestling pay-per-view event series

- Promotions: Impact Wrestling; River City Wrestling
- First event: Bash at the Brewery 1
- Last event: Bash at the Brewery 2

Bash at the Brewery is a series of professional wrestling special live events which are produced by Impact Wrestling and River City Wrestling for Impact Wrestling's video-on-demand service Impact Plus, airing exclusively on Impact Plus.

== Events ==
#	Event	Date	Location	Venue	Main event
1	Bash at the Brewery 1	July 5, 2019	San Antonio, Texas	Freetail Brewing Company	Rob Van Dam vs. Sami Callihan
2	Bash at the Brewery 2	January 10, 2020	San Antonio, Texas	Freetail Brewing Company	Ohio Versus Everything (Dave Crist, Jake Crist, Madman Fulton and Sami Callihan) vs. Brian Cage, Rich Swann, Tessa Blanchard and Willie Mack in an eight-person tag team Elimination match
