= Bash at the Brewery 1 =

2019 professional wrestling event in Texas, US

Bash at the Brewery
- Promotional poster featuring various Impact wrestlers
- Promotion(s): Impact Wrestling; River City Wrestling
- Date: July 5, 2019
- City: San Antonio, Texas
- Venue: Freetail Brewing Company

Impact Plus Monthly Specials chronology
← Previous; A Night You Can't Mist	Next → Unbreakable

Bash at the Brewery chronology
← Previous; First	Next → 2

Bash at the Brewery was a professional wrestling event produced by Impact Wrestling in conjunction with River City Wrestling. It took place on July 5, 2019, at the Freetail Brewing Company in San Antonio, Texas and aired live on Impact Plus. It was the first event in the Bash at the Brewery chronology.

Eight professional wrestling matches were contested at the event. The main event was an Extreme Rules match which saw Rob Van Dam defeat Sami Callihan. In other prominent matches on the undercard, The North (Ethan Page and Josh Alexander) defeated The Latin American Xchange (Ortiz and Santana) to win their first Impact World Tag Team Championship, Fallah Bahh successfully defended the RCW Heavyweight Championship against Anthony Andrews and Michael Elgin defeated Eddie Edwards and Moose in a three-way match.

== Production ==
=== Background ===
On May 4, just a few days after the launch of its new streaming service Impact Plus, Impact Wrestling announced that it was going to form a partnership with the San Antonio-based independent promotion River City Wrestling to hold an event called Bash at the Brewery at the Freetail Brewery in San Antonio on July 5 and the event would be exclusively aired live on Impact Plus.

=== Storylines ===
The event featured wrestlers from pre-existing scripted feuds and storylines. Wrestlers portrayed villains, heroes, or less distinguishable characters in the scripted events that built tension and culminated in a wrestling match or series of matches. Storylines played out on Impact! and Xplosion.

On June 11, it was announced that Rob Van Dam and Sabu would face The North (Ethan Page and Josh Alexander) in a tag team match on the June 14 episode of Impact! to determine the #1 contenders for the Impact World Tag Team Championship. North won the match, thus earning a tag team title match against The Latin American Xchange (Ortiz and Santana) at Bash at the Brewery.

On June 15, it was announced that Taya Valkyrie would defend the Knockouts Championship against Rosemary, Su Yung and Havok in a four-way Monster's Ball match at Slammiversary XVII. It was later announced that Rosemary and Yung would compete in a warmup match at Bash at the Brewery.

On June 23, it was announced that Eddie Edwards would face Michael Elgin in a match at Bash at the Brewery.

On June 24, it was announced that the RCW Freetail Cup winner Anthony Andrews would face Impact Wrestling roster member and the RCW Heavyweight Champion Fallah Bahh at Bash at the Brewery.

On June 24, a non-title match was announced between the Impact World Champion Brian Cage and Moose to take place at Bash at the Brewery.

On June 25, Tessa Blanchard accepted Sami Callihan's challenge for a match at Slammiversary XVII due to their ongoing rivalry. On July 1, it was announced that Callihan did not want to wrestle Blanchard at Bash at the Brewery but wanted her to wrestle his Ohio Versus Everything teammates Dave Crist, Jake Crist and Madman Fulton. However, Impact Wrestling management announced that Callihan would have to compete at the event against Rob Van Dam. It was then announced that Rich Swann and Willie Mack would be Blanchard's partners against oVe in a six-person tag team match at Bash at the Brewery. It was later announced that the Extreme Rules match between RVD and Callihan would be the main event of Bash at the Brewery.

On June 29, RCW announced on its Facebook page that The Rascalz (Dez, Trey and Wentz) would take on RCW's Andy Dalton, Matthew Palmer and Steve O Reno in a six-man tag team match.

On July 1, a knockouts match was announced between Jordynne Grace and Havok to take place at Bash at the Brewery.

== Event ==
=== Preliminary matches ===
The event kicked off with a six-man tag team match pitting The Rascalz (Dez, Trey and Wentz) against Andy Dalton, Matthew Palmer and Steve O Reno. Dez nailed Dalton with a Final Flash for the win. After the match, Brian Cage appeared to wrestle Moose but was attacked by Michael Elgin before the match, who repeatedly hit Elgin with chair shots in his injured lower back, thus injuring Cage and rendered him unable to wrestle later in the night. Later at the event, Moose confronted Elgin, which led to Moose being added into Elgin and Eddie Edwards' scheduled match, making it a three-way match.

Next, Fallah Bahh defended the RCW Heavyweight Championship against Anthony Andrews. Bahh delivered a Samoan drop and a Banzai Drop to Andrews to pin him to retain the title.

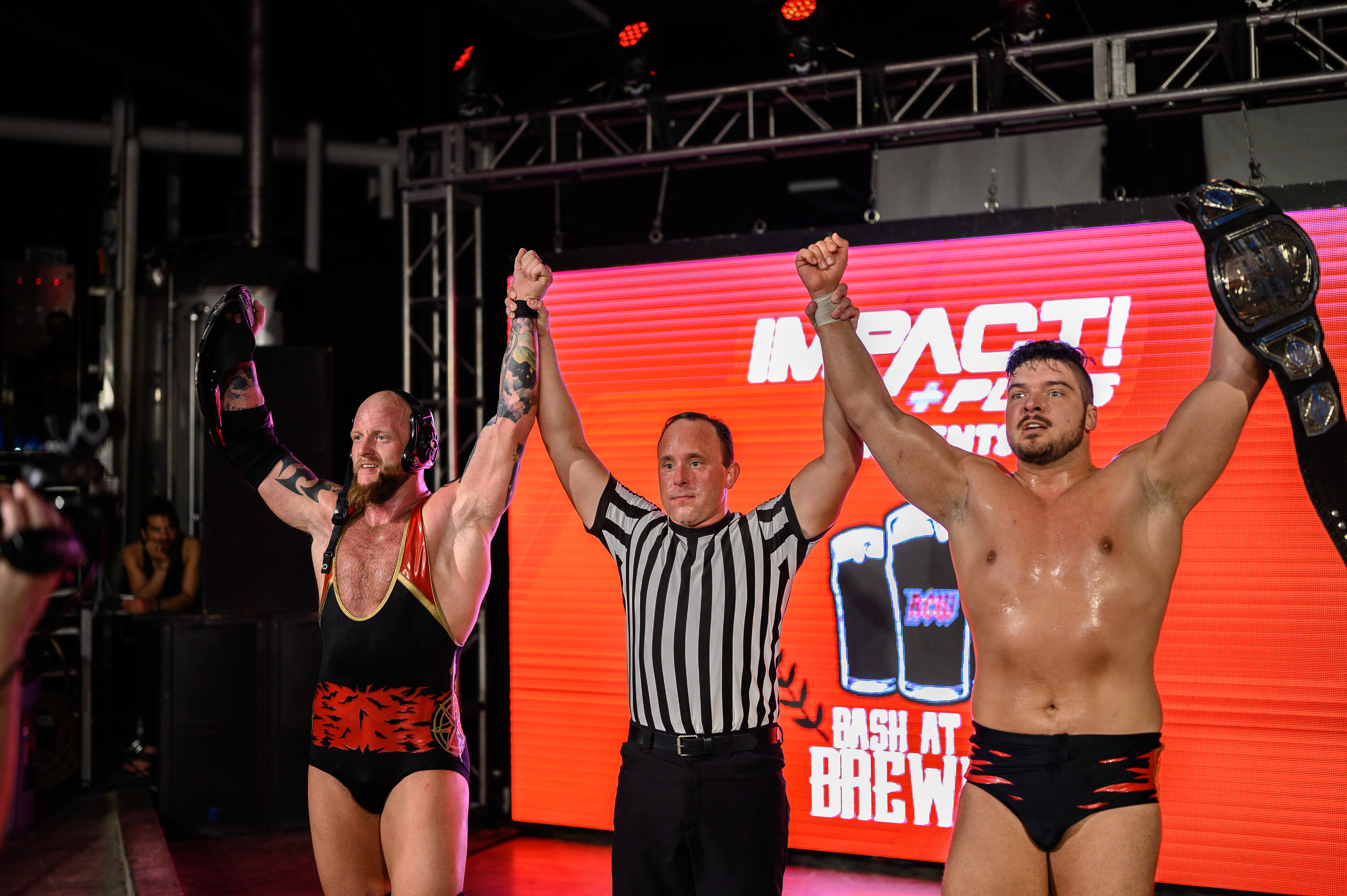
The North after they won the Impact World Tag Team Championship at Bash at the Brewery

Next, Jordynne Grace took on Havok. Grace applied a sleeper hold on Havok outside the ring and Su Yung attacked Grace until Rosemary made the save, which led to it becoming a tag team match pitting Rosemary and Grace against Yung and Havok. Grace knocked out Havok with a suicide dive outside the ring, allowing Rosemary to hit a spear to Yung for the win.

Next, Rich Swann, Tessa Blanchard and Willie Mack took on Ohio Versus Everything (Dave Crist, Jake Crist and Madman Fulton) in a six-person tag team match. Swann nailed a Lethal Injection to Jake and Blanchard knocked out Dave and then delivered a Magnum to Jake for the win.

Later, Eddie Edwards took on Michael Elgin and Moose in a triple threat match. Edwards took out Moose by hitting him with his Kenny 2.0, allowing Elgin to hit a turnbuckle powerbomb and an Elgin Bomb to Edwards for the win.

In the penultimate match, The Latin American Xchange (Ortiz and Santana) defended the Impact World Tag Team Championship against The North (Ethan Page and Josh Alexander). After a back and forth match, Page hit Santana with the title belt, allowing North to pick up a pinfall victory and win the World Tag Team Championship.

=== Main event ===
The main event was an extreme rules match, in which Rob Van Dam took on Sami Callihan. Jake Crist interfered in the match but Tessa Blanchard took him out, allowing RVD to hit a Van Daminator and a Five-Star Frog Splash on Callihan for the win.

== Results ==
No.	Results	Stipulations	Times
1	The Rascalz (Dez, Trey and Wentz) defeated Andy Dalton, Matthew Palmer and Steve O Reno	Six-man tag team match	06:34
2	Fallah Bahh (c) defeated Anthony Andrews (with Brandon Oliver)	Singles match for the RCW Heavyweight Championship	07:27
3	Jordynne Grace defeated Havok (with Su Yung) by disqualification	Singles match	04:33
4	Jordynne Grace and Rosemary defeated Havok and Su Yung	Tag team match	06:14
5	Rich Swann, Tessa Blanchard and Willie Mack defeated Ohio Versus Everything (Dave Crist, Jake Crist and Madman Fulton)	Six-person tag team match	12:09
6	Michael Elgin defeated Eddie Edwards and Moose	Three-way match	12:19
7	The North (Ethan Page and Josh Alexander) defeated The Latin American Xchange (Ortiz and Santana) (c)	Tag team match for the Impact World Tag Team Championship	16:51
8	Rob Van Dam defeated Sami Callihan	Singles match	13:37
(c) / – the champion(s) heading into the match
