= Slammiversary (2022) =

2022 Impact Wrestling event

- Promotional poster featuring Josh Alexander and Eric Young
- Promotion: Impact Wrestling
- Date: June 19, 2022
- City: Nashville, Tennessee
- Venue: The Asylum at the Nashville Fairgrounds
- Attendance: 526
- Buy rate: 1,260

Pay-per-view chronology
← Previous; Rebellion	Next → Bound for Glory

Slammiversary chronology
← Previous; 2021	Next → 2023

The 2022 Slammiversary was a professional wrestling pay-per-view (PPV) event produced by Impact Wrestling, and was the 18th event under the Slammiversary chronology. It took place on June 19, 2022 at The Asylum at the Nashville Fairgrounds in Nashville, Tennessee and celebrated the promotion's 20th anniversary, with the show being held exactly 20 years to the date of Impact's very first event.

Ten matches were contested at the event, including two on the pre-show and one taped as a digital exclusive. In the main event, Josh Alexander defeated Eric Young to retain the Impact World Championship. In other prominent matches, Mike Bailey won an Ultimate X match to win the Impact X Division Championship, Jordynne Grace won the inaugural Queen of the Mountain match to win the Impact Knockouts World Championship, The Good Brothers defeated The Briscoes to win the Impact World Tag Team Championship, and Impact Originals defeated Honor No More in a 10-man tag team match. This event featured videos and appearances honoring the anniversary by Sting, Kurt Angle, AJ Styles, James Storm, Chris Harris and Dixie Carter.

== Production ==
=== Background ===
On April 23, 2022, at Rebellion, it was announced by Impact Wrestling that Slammiversary would take place on June 19, 2022, in Nashville, Tennessee.

=== Storylines ===
The event featured several professional wrestling matches that involved different wrestlers from pre-existing scripted feuds, plots, and storylines. Wrestlers portrayed heroes, villains, or less distinguishable characters in scripted events that build tension and culminate in a wrestling match or series of matches. Storylines were produced on Impact's weekly television program.

On May 11, Impact Wrestling announced a Gauntlet for the Gold for the May 12 episode of Impact!, with the winner earning an Impact World Championship match against Josh Alexander at Slammiversary. On the May 12 episode of Impact!, Eric Young won the Gauntlet for the Gold by last eliminating Chris Sabin to become the number one contender for the title. On the May 19 episode of Impact!, Alexander would come to the aid of The Briscoes from a post match attack by Young and his Violent By Design group. This would lead to a match on the May 26 episode of Impact! where Violent by Design would defeat Alexander and The Briscoes when Young pinned Mark Briscoe. In an effort to weaken Violent By Design, Alexander would face Joe Doering on the June 9 episode of Impact!, but would lose by DQ when he was caught using a VBD flag on Doering followed by a standoff with Young. There would be a tense contract signing between Alexander and Young on the June 16 episode of Impact! where Violent By Design would attack Scott D'Amore and Alexander ultimately leaving him bloody after a Young piledriver on the exposed wood portion of the ring.

On May 11, Impact announced that Ace Austin would defend the Impact X Division Championship at Slammiversary in an Ultimate X match, and several qualifying matches would take place in the weeks leading up to Slammiversary. Kenny King, Mike Bailey, and Trey Miguel qualified for the match by defeating Chris Bey, Laredo Kid, and Alex Shelley, respectively. On the June 2 episode of Impact!, after King defended his spot against Blake Christian, former Impact and All Elite Wrestling (AEW) wrestler Jack Evans was announced as the fifth participant. On June 3, at the Best of the Super Juniors event held by New Japan Pro-Wrestling (NJPW), Austin joined Bullet Club. Backstage after the incident, Austin's former tag team partner Alex Zayne confronted Austin and Bullet Club, only to be attacked. As a result, the following week on Impact!!, Zayne was announced as the last participant in the Ultimate X match. On the day of Slammiversary, it was announced that, due to Evans suffering an injury, Andrew Everett would take his place in the match.

On the May 12 episode of Impact!, Knockouts executive Gail Kim announced the first ever Queen of the Mountain match, with Tasha Steelz defending the Impact Knockouts World Championship against previous champions Chelsea Green, Deonna Purrazzo, Jordynne Grace, and Mia Yim. On June 10, Impact announced that former four-time Knockouts World Champion Mickie James will serve as the match's special guest enforcer.

On the May 19 episode of Impact!, The Briscoes would successfully defend the Impact World Tag Team Championship against Joe Doering & Deaner and also The Good Brothers defeated Matt Taven & Mike Bennett. The May 26 episode of Impact! would feature Scott D'Amore making a tag title match at Slammiversary between The Briscoes and Good Brothers. Also on that show, The Good Brothers would taunt The Briscoes saying they can't be considered the best team till they beat them. On the June 2 episode of Impact!, The Good Brothers would mock The Briscoes about beating them at Multiverse of Matches leading to a brawl. The June 9 episode of Impact! would have footage of The Good Brothers at the Briscoe Family Chicken Farm in Delaware, mocking it and having a wild brawl with The Briscoes and their father. On the June 16 episode of Impact!, The Briscoes would defeat Jay White & Chris Bey despite having fellow Bullet Club members (The Good Brothers and Hikuleo) at ringside.

On the May 26 episode of Impact!, during a match between Impact Wrestling originals Chris Sabin and Frankie Kazarian, Honor No More (Eddie Edwards, Matt Taven, Mike Bennett, PCO, and Vincent) attacked both Sabin and Kazarian. This was after Taven and Bennett were denied a rematch with The Good Brothers Impact World Tag Team Championship The Briscoes, proclaiming that "if they can't have what they want, nobody can". Taven and Bennett went on to defeat Heath and Rhino the following week, before the rest of Honor No More came and target Rhino with steel chairs. While Rhino was stretchered out of the arena, Kazarian and The Motor City Machine Guns (Sabin and Alex Shelley) arrived before anymore damage was done. After the incident, Impact Executive Vice President Scott D'Amore announced a ten-man tag team match for Slammiversary, pitting Honor No More against a team of Impact Originals, which by then consisted of Kazarian and the Motor City Machine Guns. On the June 16 episode of Impact!, former Impact World Champion Nick Aldis (then known as Magnus) was announced as the fourth member of the Impact Originals.

After having his ankle broken by Moose seven months ago, Sami Callihan made his return at Under Siege, attacking Moose when he attempted to hold the show hostage. In the following weeks, Callihan would continue to play mind games with Moose, either attacking him after the arena lights or messing with the electronics. On the June 9 episode of Impact!, Callihan and Moose brawled backstage, to where Callihan eventually locked Moose in a boiler room. Impact later announced that Callihan and Moose will collide at Slammiversary in a Monster's Ball match.

On the May 12 episode of Impact!, The Influence (Madison Rayne and Tenille Dashwood) would successfully defend the Impact Knockouts World Tag Team Championship against Gisele Shaw and Alisha Edwards. On the May 19 episode of Impact!, The Influence would celebrate their win and mock Rosemary and Havok about recent Knockouts title losses, leading to Havok challenging the undefeated Masha Slamovich to a match. That match would happen on the May 26 episode of Impact!, where Slamovich would defeat Havok soundly and quickly leading to her disappearing from Impact. On the June 2 episode of Impact!, The Influence would mock Rosemary about Havok's disappearance leading to a match the next week. On the June 9 episode of Impact!, Rosemary would defeat Dashwood (w/ Rayne). Afterwards The Influence would attack Rosemary until Taya Valkyrie made the save, though they had some tension from their previous feud. The June 16 episode of Impact! would have Rosemary and Valkyrie settling their past with each other since they have a tag title shot at Slammiversary.

On May 28, at the Vegas Vacation event held by The Wrestling Revolver, Rich Swann defeated Matt Cardona to win the Impact Digital Media Championship. Afterwards, Cardona refused to give up the title, attacked Swann after the match, and made it off with the title belt. On the June 9 episode of Impact!, Cardona appeared on a Zoom call with tag team partner Brian Myers, "relinquishing" the title to the latter after suffering a torn bicep. Myers would later challenge Swann to a Digital Media Championship match at Slammiversary to determine the "real" champion.

On June 14, Impact would announce that the Reverse Battle Royal would return at the Slammiversary preshow. Raj Singh, Shera, Johnny Swinger and Zicky Dice made it known on the June 16 episode of Impact! that they intended to win it.

== Event ==
Other on-screen personnel
Commentators	Tom Hannifan
Commentators	Matthew Rehwoldt
Commentators	Scott D'Amore (10-man tag team match)
Ring announcers	David Penzer
Ring announcers	Christy Hemme (10-man tag team match)
Referees	Brian Hebner
Referees	Brandon Tolle
Referees	Daniel Spencer
Interviewers	Scott Hudson
Interviewers	Gia Miller
Interviewers	Goldy Locks

=== Pre-show ===
The opening match on the Pre-show was for the Impact Digital Media Championship between Rich Swann and Brian Myers. Myers was in control with a spear and DDT, but Swann kept kicking out. Myers charged for the Roster Cut clothesline. Swann met him with kicks then followed with a handspring cutter. A 450 splash sealed the deal. Swann finally got the championship back in his hands.

Next was the Reverse Battle Royal. In the first stage, participants start on the outside and battle to get into the ring. The field included Johnny Swinger, Chris Bey, David Young, Zicky Dice, Shera, Raj Singh, Bhupinder Gujjar, Shark Boy, Shogun, Nate Webb, Aiden Prince, Crazzy Steve, Mike Jackson, Steve Maclin, Chase Stevens, and Slash with Father James Mitchell. The participants who advanced to the next stage were Bey, Swinger, Young, Maclin, Stevens, Shark Boy, Gujjar, and Shera. In the second stage, the participants seek to eliminate each other by tossing their opponents over the top rope and out of the ring, as in a traditional battle royal. Eliminations were Stevens by Shera, Maclin by Bey, Bey by Bey when falling to the floor after hitting a cutter on the apron to eliminate Maclin, Gujjar by Young and Swinger, Shera by Young and Swinger, and Young by Swinger. The final stage between the last two participants is won by pinfall or submission. Shark Boy and Swinger were the final participants. Swinger tossed Shark Boy over the ropes thinking he won, but was reminded of the rules. Swinger warmed up with a muscle pump, then Shark Boy hit him with a Chummer to win.

=== Preliminary matches ===
The opening contest was the Ultimate X match for the X-Division Championship between defending champion Ace Austin, "Speedball" Mike Bailey, Trey Miguel, Kenny King, Alex Zayne, and Andrew Everett, who replaced Jack Evans due to injury. Bailey won the match and the title.

The next match was for the Knockouts World Tag Team Championship. The reunited Rosemary and Taya Valkyrie faced The Influence (Tenille Dashwood and Madison Rayne). The match was won by Rosemary and Valkyrie.

Next was a Monster's Ball match. Callihan and Moose went to war. Both men were put through tables, Callihan countered a spear for a Death Valley Driver through a barbed wire board, and Callihan hit a piledriver onto thumbtacks. Moose powered up after taking a second piledriver, so Callihan pulled out a barbed wire baseball bat. A couple of wacks and a third piledriver earned victory for Callihan.

The Impact World Tag Team Championship was defended as The Good Brothers faced The Briscoes. After the Good Brothers won, America's Most Wanted appeared to toast the tag team division in Impact.

The next match was a 10-man tag team match featuring the Impact Originals (The Motor City Machine Guns (Chris Sabin and Alex Shelley), Frankie Kazarian, Nick Aldis, and Davey Richards) versus Honor No More (Eddie Edwards, The OGK (Matt Taven and Mike Bennett), Vincent, and PCO). The Impact Originals won the match after much outside interference.

In the next match, the first-ever Queen of the Mountain match was held for the Knockouts Championship between defending champ Tasha Steelz, Jordynne Grace, Deonna Purrazzo, Chelsea Green, and Mia Yim. Mickie James was special guest enforcer. Grace climbed the ladder for victory.

=== Main event ===
The main event featured Josh Alexander facing Eric Young for the Impact World Championship. Young's allies Joe Doering and Deaner were ringside. Alexander won following a C4 Spike on exposed wood from the ring. After the match, Doering and Deaner would attack Alexander. This would cause Bhupinder Gujjar, Shark Boy, David Young, and Nate Webb to come to his aid. Honor No More (Eddie Edwards, Matt Taven, Mike Bennett and Vincent) would come out to attack them. Chris Sabin, Alex Shelley, Frankie Kazarian and Nick Aldis would join the brawl and help the others to run off Doering, Deaner and Honor No More. Alexander would then address the crowd praising the fans, wrestlers and backstage staff for helping Impact reach the twenty year milestone and beyond.

== Results ==
No.	Results	Stipulations	Times
1^{D}	Savannah Evans defeated Alisha Edwards by pinfall (Note: The match was taped for an Impact Digital Exclusive that aired on June 26.)	Singles match	4:56
2^{P}	Rich Swann (c) defeated Brian Myers by pinfall	Singles match for the Impact Digital Media Championship	7:10
3^{P}	Shark Boy won by last eliminating Johnny Swinger (Note: Order of elimination from first eliminated: Aiden Prince, Crazzy Steve, Mike Jackson, Nate Webb, Raj Singh, Shogun, Slash, Zicky Dice, Chase Stevens, Steve Maclin, Chris Bey, Bhupinder Gujjar, Shera, David Young, and Johnny Swinger.)	Reverse Battle Royal	9:40
4	Mike Bailey defeated Ace Austin (c), Alex Zayne, Andrew Everett, Kenny King, and Trey Miguel	Ultimate X match for the Impact X Division Championship	9:50
5	Rosemary and Taya Valkyrie defeated The Influence (Madison Rayne and Tenille Dashwood) (c) by pinfall	Tag team match for the Impact Knockouts World Tag Team Championship	7:20
6	Sami Callihan defeated Moose by pinfall	Monster's Ball match	16:00
7	The Good Brothers (Doc Gallows and Karl Anderson) defeated The Briscoes (Jay Briscoe and Mark Briscoe) (c) by pinfall	Tag team match for the Impact World Tag Team Championship	10:00
8	Impact Originals (Alex Shelley, Chris Sabin, Davey Richards, Frankie Kazarian, and Nick Aldis) defeated Honor No More (Eddie Edwards, Matt Taven, Mike Bennett, PCO, and Vincent) (with Maria Kanellis-Bennett) by pinfall	10-man tag team match	18:45
9	Jordynne Grace defeated Tasha Steelz (c) (with Savannah Evans), Chelsea Green, Deonna Purrazzo, and Mia Yim	Queen of the Mountain match for the Impact Knockouts World Championship; Mickie James was the special guest enforcer.	18:15
10	Josh Alexander (c) defeated Eric Young (with Deaner and Joe Doering) by pinfall	Singles match for the Impact World Championship	18:50
(c) / – the champion(s) heading into the match; D / – this was a dark match; P / – the match was broadcast on the pre-show

=== Queen of the Mountain match statistics ===
No.	Wrestler	Wrestler pinned or made to submit	Method
1	Chelsea Green	Tasha Steelz	Pinned after a crossbody
2	Mia Yim	Chelsea Green	Pinned with a Bridging German suplex
3	Deonna Purrazzo	Tasha Steelz	Submitted to a fujiwara armbar
4	Mia Yim	Jordynne Grace	Pinned after a package piledriver
5	Jordynne Grace and Tasha Steelz	Mia Yim	Pinned after a Bridging German suplex/jackknife combo
6	Jordynne Grace	Tasha Steelz	Pinned after the Grace Driver
Winner	Jordynne Grace	N/A	Grace hung the title to win
