= Honor No More =

Professional wrestling stable

Stable
- Leader: Eddie Edwards
- Members: Matt Taven; Mike Bennett; Maria Kanellis-Bennett; PCO; Vincent; Kenny King
- Name: Honor No More
- Billed heights: Taven: 6 ft 2 in (1.88 m); Bennett: 5 ft 11 in (1.80 m); PCO: 6 ft 1 in (1.85 m); Vincent: 5 ft 8 in (1.73 m); Kanellis-Bennett: 5 ft 7 in (1.70 m); King: 6 ft 0 in (1.83 m); Edwards: 6 ft 0 in (1.83 m)
- Debut: January 8, 2022
- Disbanded: November 3, 2022
- Years active: 2022

Honor No More was a villainous professional wrestling stable that appeared in the American promotion Impact Wrestling. The group was led by Eddie Edwards and was composed of former Ring of Honor (ROH) wrestlers.

== History ==
On October 27, 2021, Ring of Honor announced that it would go on a hiatus after Final Battle in December of that year. All personnel would be released from their contracts as part of plans to "reimagine" the company as a "fan-focused product". At Hard To Kill on January 8, 2022, an event that featured appearances by notable ROH personnel, Honor No More would make their first appearance by attacking Eddie Edwards, Rich Swann, Willie Mack, and Heath and Rhino. After further attacks over the next several weeks, Maria Kanellis-Bennett would formally announce the name of their group at the end of the January 20 episode of Impact!. Kenny King returned to Impact Wrestling on the February 3 episode of Impact! to join the faction.

On February 19 at No Surrender, Eddie Edwards would join the group after costing Team Impact a 10-man tag team match against Honor No More, where the latter team would have had to leave Impact Wrestling if they had lost. At the end of the February 24 episode of Impact!, Kanellis would introduce Edwards as "the man who opened the door for Honor No More" before the latter would explain his actions. After Kenny Omega won the Impact World Championship in a cross-promotional match at Rebellion in 2021, Edwards waited to be chosen by Impact management to challenge for the title and "restore honor" to the company. Instead, it was Moose and Sami Callihan who both challenged and failed to beat Omega over the Summer. Josh Alexander would ultimately win the Impact World title at Bound for Glory (only for Moose to invoke his Call Your Shot Gauntlet championship match privilege which he won earlier that night, then immediately challenged, and defeat, Alexander for the title). Feeling betrayed by Impact Wrestling (as well as by Ring of Honor, a company Edwards once wrestled for, going on a hiatus and releasing members of Honor No More from their contracts), Edwards cost Team Impact the match at No Surrender.

On March 5 at Sacrifice, Matt Taven and Mike Bennett lost to Rich Swann and Willie Mack in the pre-show, Eddie Edwards defeated Rhino, and PCO lost to Jonah. On April 1 at Multiverse of Matches, Vincent failed to capture the X Division Championship in an Ultimate X match, Edwards lost to New Japan Pro-Wrestling talent Tomohiro Ishii, and PCO teamed with Impact World Champion Moose to face Jonah and Josh Alexander in a losing effort. On April 23 at Rebellion, Kenny King lost to Crazzy Steve in a dark match taped for an Impact Digital Exclusive, Edwards lost to Chris Bey in the pre-show, and Taven and Bennett failed to win the Impact World Tag Team Championship in an Eight-Team Elimination Challenge. On May 7 at Under Siege, Honor No More defeated Bullet Club (Jay White, Chris Bey, Doc Gallows, El Phantasmo, and Karl Anderson) in a 10-man tag team match. On June 19 at Slammiversary, King failed to capture the X Division Championship in an Ultimate X match, and the rest of Honor No More lost a 10-man tag team match against the Impact Originals (Alex Shelley, Chris Sabin, Frankie Kazarian, Nick Aldis, and Davey Richards). On July 1 at Against All Odds, Honor No More lost another 10-man tag team match against Heath, America's Most Wanted (Chris Harris and James Storm), and The Good Brothers (Doc Gallows and Karl Anderson).

On the July 28 episode of Impact!, after Eddie Edwards defeated Ace Austin, he and the rest of Honor No More attacked the production truck and caused technical difficulties with the broadcast. Impact Executive Vice President Scott D'Amore confronted the group and put them in a 10-man tag team match against Bullet Club at Emergence; if Honor No More won, they would get a shot at the Impact World Tag Team Championship, but if Bullet Club won, Honor No More must permanently disband. At the event, Honor No More won the match. On the August 18 episode of Impact!, Edwards won a six-way elimination match to become the number one contender to Josh Alexander's Impact World Championship at Bound for Glory. On August 26 (which aired on tape delay on September 1), Matt Taven and Mike Bennett defeated The Good Brothers to win the Impact World Tag Team Championship for the first time. On September 23 at Victory Road, PCO and Vincent lost to The Motor City Machine Guns (Alex Shelley and Chris Sabin), King failed to win the number one contendership for the X-Division Championship in an Intergender Triple Threat Revolver, and Edwards, Taven and Bennett defeated Heath, Alexander and Swann in a six-man tag team match. On October 7 at Bound for Glory, Taven and Bennett successfully defended the tag team titles against the Motor City Machine Guns, PCO failed to win the Call Your Shot Gauntlet, and Edwards was unsuccessful in capturing the Impact World Championship from Alexander.

On October 8 (which aired on tape delay on October 20), after Taven and Bennett dropped the Impact World Tag Team Championship to Heath and Rhino, it was announced that they along with Kanellis and Vincent had left Impact Wrestling. That same date, PCO also left the stable after attacking his partners.

== Members ==
| Name | Joined | Left |
|---|---|---|
| Matt Taven | January 8, 2022 | October 8, 2022 (Note: Taven's leaving of Honor No More was aired on tape delay on the October 20 episode of Impact!) |
| Mike Bennett | January 8, 2022 | October 8, 2022 (Note: Bennett's leaving of Honor No More was aired on tape delay on the October 20 episode of Impact!) |
| Maria Kanellis-Bennett | January 8, 2022 | October 8, 2022 (Note: Kanellis' leaving of Honor No More was aired on tape delay on the October 20 episode of Impact!) |
| PCO | January 8, 2022 | October 8, 2022 (Note: PCO's leaving of Honor No More was aired on tape delay on the October 20 episode of Impact!) |
| Vincent | January 8, 2022 | October 8, 2022 (Note: Vincent's leaving of Honor No More was aired on tape delay on the October 20 episode of Impact!) |
| Kenny King | February 3, 2022 | November 3, 2022 |
| Eddie Edwards (leader) (Note: Edwards was not revealed as the leader of the group until No Surrender.) | February 19, 2022 | November 3, 2022 |

== Championships and accomplishments ==
- Impact Wrestling
  - Impact World Tag Team Championship (1 time) – Bennett and Taven
- Ring of Honor
  - ROH World Six-Man Tag Team Championship (1 time) – Vincent with Bateman and Dutch (1)
- The Wrestling Revolver
  - PWR Tag Team Championship (1 time) – Bennett and Taven
