= Willie Mack =

American professional wrestler (born 1987)

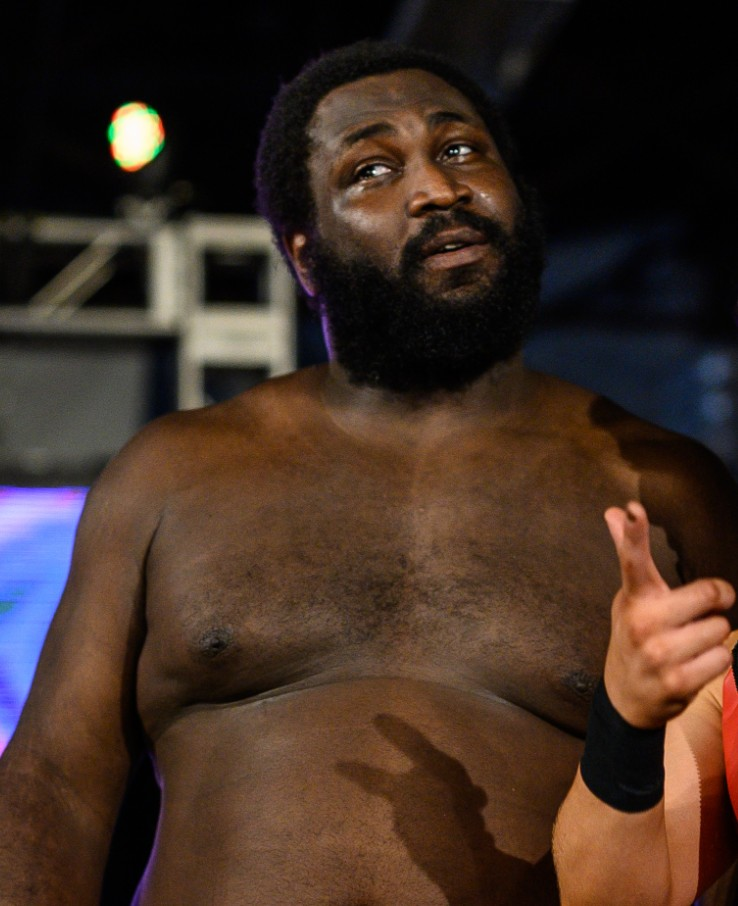
- Mack in 2019

Personal information
- Born: Willie McClinton Jr. January 5, 1987 (age 39) St. Louis, Missouri, U.S.

Professional wrestling career
- Ring name(s): Downtown Daddy Brown; Chocolate Caliente; The Mack; Willie Mack
- Billed height: 5 ft 10 in (1.78 m)
- Billed weight: 280 lb (130 kg; 20 st)
- Billed from: South Central, Los Angeles, California
- Trained by: Joey Ryan; Aaron Aguilera
- Debut: May 14, 2006

Willie McClinton Jr. (born January 5, 1987), better known by his ring name Willie Mack, is an American professional wrestler. He is currently a frequent wrestler on the Juggalo Championship Wrestling (JCW) roster, where he is a former two-time JCW Heavyweight Champion and former JCW World Tag Team Champion. He also makes appearances on the independent circuit. He is best known for his tenure with Impact Wrestling, where he is a former one-time Impact X Division Champion.

Mack spent the first years of his career working in the independent circuit, usually in California-based promotions like Pro Wrestling Guerrilla and Championship Wrestling from Hollywood. He had his first national exposure in 2015, when he signed with the El Rey Network show Lucha Underground, a pro wrestling series created by Mexican promotion Lucha Libre AAA Worldwide. He worked until 2018 as The Mack and won the Lucha Underground Trios Championship two times. After Lucha Underground ended, he worked in the National Wrestling Alliance, where he is a former NWA National Heavyweight Champion, but he left the promotion after signing a contract with AAA partner Impact Wrestling.

== Professional wrestling career ==
=== Independent circuit (2006–present) ===
Mack began his wrestling training while still in high school, but put it on hold until he graduated. He then attended Martin Marin's WPW Training School in Anaheim, California and wrestled at their weekly events at the Anaheim Marketplace. Knowing that he needed further training, Mack moved on to Bart Kapitzke's AWS School in Industry, California and began wrestling for the National Wrestling Alliance (NWA) sanctioned Alternative Wrestling Show.

At AWS, he was noticed by NWA producers and was invited to appear at tapings of NWA Wrestling Showcase, where he had the opportunity to face such wrestlers as Adam Pearce, Brent Albright, Joey Ryan, Chris Escobar and more. Mack also wrestled at the tapings as part of a tag team with his best friend and fellow WPW graduate Jerome Robinson.

Mack began wrestling for another NWA sanctioned group, Mach One Wrestling, who run weekly events at the American Sports Center across the street from where WPW had run previously. Mack was instantly one of the most popular wrestlers in the group. On February 5, 2010 after defeating Scorpio Sky in a number one contenders match for the M1W Championship, Mack entered himself into a three-way elimination match later that same evening, making it a four-way. After Joey Ryan and James Morgan were eliminated, Mack defeated reigning champion, Bobby Marshall to claim the title.

On March 5, 2011, Mack lost the M1W Championship to Morgan in a four-way match that also involved Nick Madrid and Andrew Hellman. On November 2, 2013, Mack participated in a tournament to crown the first MexPro Wrestling United States Champion. He defeated Jacob Diez and SoCal Crazy in the semi-finals, but he lost to CJ Kruz in the finale. On November 3, 2013, Mack was defeated by Samoa Joe at Championship Wrestling from Hollywood's Open Door, in a Dream match. On November 14, 2013, Mack was defeated by the CWFH Santino Bros. Wrestling Champion Robby Phoenix. On June 15, 2014 Mack won the Championship Wrestling from Hollywood Red Carpet Rumble in a match which included Matt Striker, X-Pac, Jake "The Snake" Roberts and Joey Ryan.

=== Pro Wrestling Guerrilla (2010–2014) ===
Mack debuted for the Southern California company Pro Wrestling Guerrilla on December 11, 2010, winning his first match. It has been acknowledged on DVD commentary that he attended PWG shows as a fan before training to be a wrestler. On March 4, 2011, Mack participated in the 2011 Dynamite Duumvirate Tag Team Title Tournament, pairing with Brandon Gatson in a loss against The Young Bucks (Matt and Nick Jackson), the eventual winners, in the Opening Round. On May 27, Mack gained a substantial win by upsetting Kevin Steen. He then began a streak of wrestling top names on the independent scene, defeating Chris Hero in the first round of the 2011 Battle of Los Angeles before losing to El Generico, the eventual winner, in the Semifinal Round. On December 10, Mack beat Chris Hero for a second time in what ended up being Hero's PWG exit match. He continued his streak by beating Naruki Doi on January 29 and Roderick Strong on March 17, 2012.

Mack took part in the 2012 Dynamite Duumvirate Tag Team Title Tournament, teaming with El Generico as 2 Husky Black Guys. The duo beat Roderick Strong and the debuting Sami Callihan in the Opening and the RockNES Monsters (Johnny Goodtime and Johnny Yuma) in the Semifinal Rounds, before succumbing to the Super Smash Bros. (Player Uno and Stupefied) in the Final. On May 25, Mack faced and beat debutant Michael Elgin. On July 21 at Threemendous III, PWG's nine-year anniversary event, Mack received a shot at the PWG World Championship, but was defeated by defending champion Kevin Steen. The match saw an interference by Brian Cage, which launched a feud between Cage and Mack. The 2012 Battle of Los Angeles, taking place in September, saw Mack lose against Sami Callihan on Night One. The following month at Failure to Communicate, Mack lost in his first encounter against Brian Cage. At Mystery Vortex on December 1, he faced Cage once more, this time in a match also involving B-Boy and T. J. Perkins, with Mack emerging victorious. Mack wrestled his PWG farewell match on August 31, 2014.

=== WWE signing (2014) ===
In September 2014, it was reported that McClinton had passed WWE's medical tests and would be reporting to WWE's developmental territory, NXT, in Orlando, Florida. He had been signed to the promotion for a few months at this point. However, only a month later on October 13, 2014, McClinton stated that he had been released from WWE before he had even arrived in Orlando. A few years later, McClinton said WWE fired him because a medical test found something wrong with his blood pressure and his knee; however, he suspects he was fired because WWE signed another African American wrestler at the same time that had a better body than him.

=== Lucha Underground (2015–2018) ===
Mack representing The Crash as part of La Junta in the World Wrestling League

In February 2015, it was announced Mack worked at Lucha Underground's TV Tapings. He wrestled under the ringname The Mack, Big Ryck's cousin. On February 8, 2015, along with Killshot and Big Ryck participated in a tournament for the LU Trios Championship, but they were defeated in the semi-finals by the eventual winners Angélico, Son of Havoc and Ivelisse. Mack was then put into a feud with Cage, who attacked Mack backstage in order to be a part of a trios team with Big Ryck and Davari. Their feud culminated in a falls count anywhere match that saw Mack lose to Cage. On the first set of tapings for season 2 of Lucha Underground Mack defeated the debuting PJ Black using the stunner. Mack was unsuccessful at winning the Lucha Underground Championship against Johnny Mundo in a Falls Count Anywhere match. Mack would team with A. R. Fox and Killshot as they defeated Snake Tribe (Drago, Pindar and Vibora) to win the Lucha Underground Trios Championship. During the season 4, Fox was replaced by Son of Havoc as champion, starting a feud with Killshot. The trio would lose the title against The Reptile Tribe. The serie was discontinued after season finale, Ultima Lucha Cuatro.

=== Impact Wrestling ===
==== Teaming with Rich Swann (2018–2020) ====
Willie Mack made his debut for Impact Wrestling on the October 11, 2018, episode of Impact!, where Rich Swann introduced him as his tag team partner for an upcoming match at Bound for Glory. At the event, the duo defeated Matt Sydal and Ethan Page. Following his debut, Mack became a regular competitor on Impact! and frequently teamed with Swann.

In late 2018, Mack entered a feud with Ohio Versus Everything (oVe). On the December 6 episode of Impact!, he lost an Ultimate X qualifying match to Jake Crist after interference from Sami Callihan, oVe's leader. This initiated a rivalry with Callihan, culminating in a loss at Homecoming in January 2019, but Mack secured a victory in a rematch on the January 11 episode of Impact!. Throughout early 2019, Mack continued to feud with oVe, often teaming with Swann, Tommy Dreamer, and Fallah Bahh in multi-man matches.

In May 2019, Mack began a short-lived feud with Michael Elgin, resulting in losses at Code Red and on the June 14 episode of Impact!. He resumed his rivalry with oVe, teaming with Swann and Tessa Blanchard to defeat Dave and Jake Crist, and Madman Fulton at Bash at the Brewery. At Slammiversary XVII, Mack defeated Jake Crist, TJP, and Trey in a four-way match. He later participated in a tag team tournament to determine a number one contender for the Impact World Championship, where he was randomly paired with Elgin. The team defeated Ace Austin and Stone Rockwell to advance to the finals, where they were eliminated after Elgin turned on Mack.

Mack and Swann subsequently entered a feud with The North over the Impact World Tag Team Championship. They challenged unsuccessfully for the titles in a triple threat match also involving Reno Scum at Unbreakable, and again in another three-way bout with Rhino and Rob Van Dam at Bound for Glory. Additional challenges at Turning Point and Hard to Kill also ended in defeat; the latter saw Mack compete in a handicap match after Swann suffered an ankle injury and was unable to participate.

==== X Division Champion (2020–2022) ====
On the February 11, 2020 episode of Impact!, Mack and Johnny Swinger lost a match to Desi Hit Squad members Mahabali Shera and Rohit Raju, which led to a post-match confrontation between the two and Mack briefly feuded with Swinger, which led to Mack defeating Swinger in subsequent matches. On the March 24 episode of Impact!, Mack won an eight-way match to become the #1 contender for the X Division Championship. He received his title shot against Ace Austin at Rebellion. Mack defeated Austin to win the X Division Championship, his first title in Impact Wrestling. In his first title defense, Mack successfully defended the title against Austin and Chris Bey in a three-way match on the May 5 episode of Impact Wrestling. Mack then retained the title against Johnny Swinger on the May 19 episode of Impact!. On July 7, 2020 Mack retained the title against Swinger-Cide (Johnny Swinger dressed as Suicide). On July 18, at Slammiversary, Mack lost the championship to Chris Bey.

He then began a feud against Brian Myers. At Emergence Night Two, he was defeated by Myers and successively lost the feud. At Victory Road, Mack defeated the X-Division Champion Rohit Raju by countout. At Bound for Glory, Mack competed in a Six-way Intergender Scramble match for the Impact X Division Championship which was won by Rohit Raju. At Turning Point, Mack defeated Moose by disqualification in match for the unsanctioned TNA World Heavyweight Championship. At Genesis, Mack defeated Moose in a "I Quit" Match. At No Surrender, Mack competed in the Triple Threat Revolver to determine the number one contender for the Impact X Division Championship which was won by Josh Alexander. At Hardcore Justice, Team Dreamer (Mack, Eddie Edwards, Rich Swann, and Trey Miguel) lost to Violent By Design (Eric Young, Deaner, Joe Doering and Rhino) in Hardcore War. At Under Siege, Mack lost to W. Morrissey. At Homecoming, Mack lost to Deaner. At Emergence, Mack and Rich Swann competed in a Three-way tag team match for the Impact World Tag Team Championship but failed to win the titles. At Victory Road, Mack and Swann lost to The Good Brothers failing to win the titles.

At Hard To Kill, Mack, Swann, Eddie Edwards, Heath and Rhino defeated The Good Brothers and Violent By Design (Deaner, Eric Young and Joe Doering). At No Surrender, Team Impact (Mack, Chris Sabin, Rhino, Rich Swann, and Steve Maclin) lost to Honor No More (Matt Taven, Mike Bennett, PCO, Vincent, and Kenny King). At Sacrifice. Mack and Swann defeated Honor No More (Matt Taven and Mike Bennett). At Rebellion, Mack and Swann competed in an Eight-Team Elimination Challenge which was won by Violent By Design (Eric Young and Joe Doering).

On May 6, 2022, Mack announced his departure from the company.

=== National Wrestling Alliance (2018–2019) ===
Mack begun to wrestle for the official reborn National Wrestling Alliance (NWA) promotion under Billy Corgan. He had returned to wrestling for Championship Wrestling From Hollywood, which the NWA has had a working relationship with since February 2018. Mack was named as the first challenger for the NWA Worlds Heavyweight Champion Cody Rhodes. Their match took place at the Ring of Honor (ROH) Death Before Dishonor XVI event on September 28, 2018, where he was defeated by Cody. At the NWA 70th Anniversary Show on October 21, 2018, Mack defeated Sam Shaw to win the vacant NWA National Heavyweight Championship. Both Mack and Shaw had won separate four-way elimination matches earlier in the card to qualify for the chance to win this title. At the 2019 Crockett Cup, Mack lost the title to Colt Cabana.

=== Major League Wrestling (2022–2023) ===
Mack begun to wrestle for Major League Wrestling (MLW). At MLW Fury Road 2023 Mack challenged Alex Kane for the MLW World Heavyweight Championship in a losing effort.

=== All Elite Wrestling (2023–2025) ===
Mack made his All Elite Wrestling (AEW) debut on the January 16, 2023 episode of Dark: Elevation, where he lost to Brian Cage. He participated in a 12-man tag team match at Revolution: Zero Hour on March 3, 2024 against the Bang Bang Scissor Gang, where his team was defeated.

== Championships and accomplishments ==
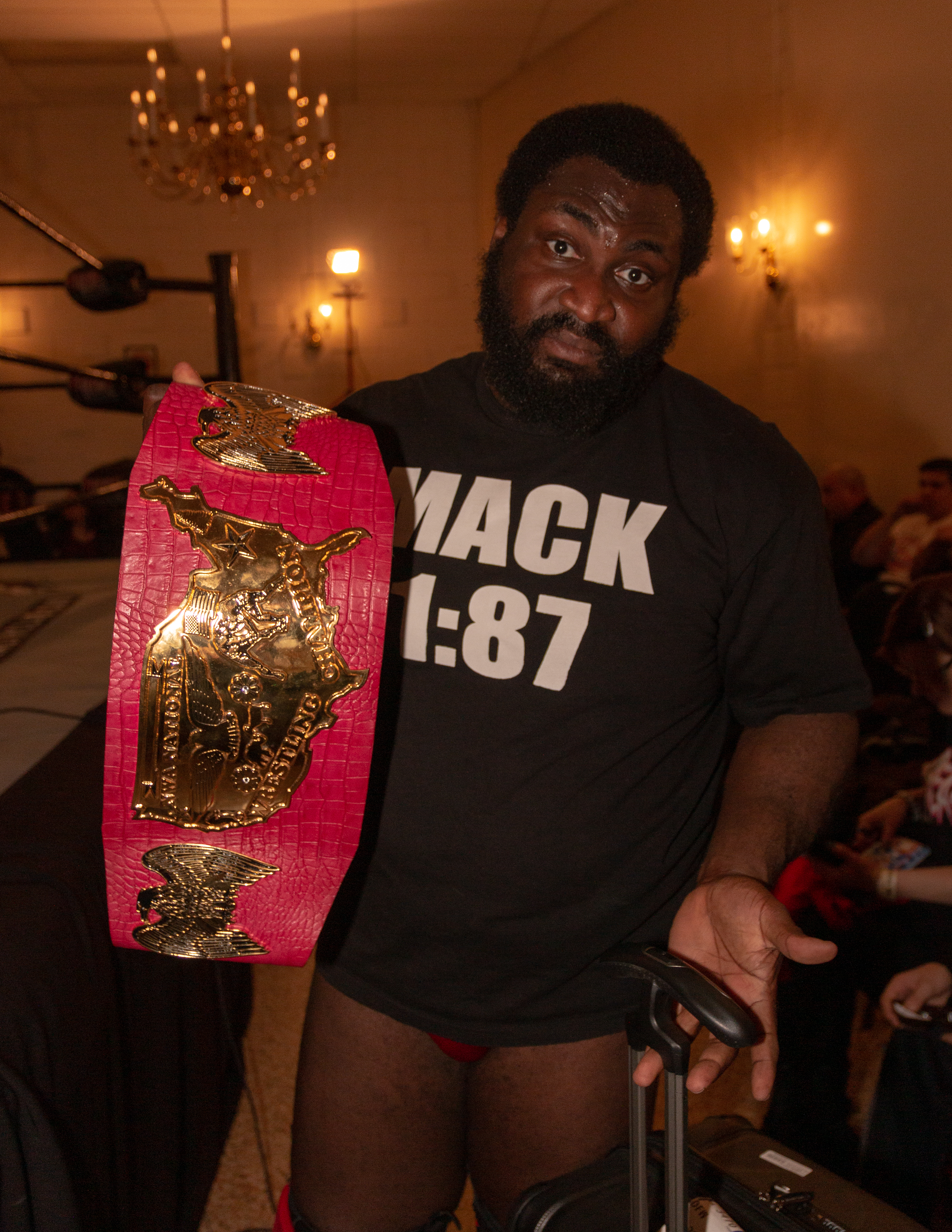
Mack with the NWA National Championship

- Alternative Wrestling Show
  - AWS Heavyweight Championship (1 time)
- Championship Wrestling from Hollywood
  - CWFH International Television Championship (1 time)
  - Red Carpet Rumble (2014)
- The Crash Lucha Libre
  - The Crash Heavyweight Championship (1 time)
- House of Hardcore
  - HOH Twitch Television Championship (1 time, inaugural, final)
  - HOH Twitch TV Title Tournament (2018)
- Impact Wrestling
  - Impact X Division Championship (1 time)
  - Impact Year End Awards (1 time)
    - One to Watch in 2020 (2019)
- Insane Wrestling League
  - IWL Anarchy Championship (1 time)
- Juggalo Championship Wrestling
  - JCW Heavyweight Championship (2 times)
  - JCW World Tag Team Championship (1 time) - with 2 Tuff Tony as Juggalo World Order
- Lucha Underground
  - Lucha Underground Trios Championship (2 times) – with A. R. Fox and Killshot (1) and Killshot and Son of Havoc (1)
  - Battle of the Bulls Tournament
- National Wrestling Alliance
  - NWA National Championship (1 time)
- Pro Wrestling Illustrated
  - Ranked No. 68 of the top 500 singles wrestlers in the PWI 500 in 2020
- Rival Pro Wrestling
  - RPW Undisputed Championship (1 time)
- Pro Wrestling Revolution
  - PWR Tag Team Championship (1 time) – with Vinnie Massaro
- SoCal Uncensored
  - Southern California Wrestler of the Year (2010)
