= Kenny King (wrestler) =

American professional wrestler (born 1981)

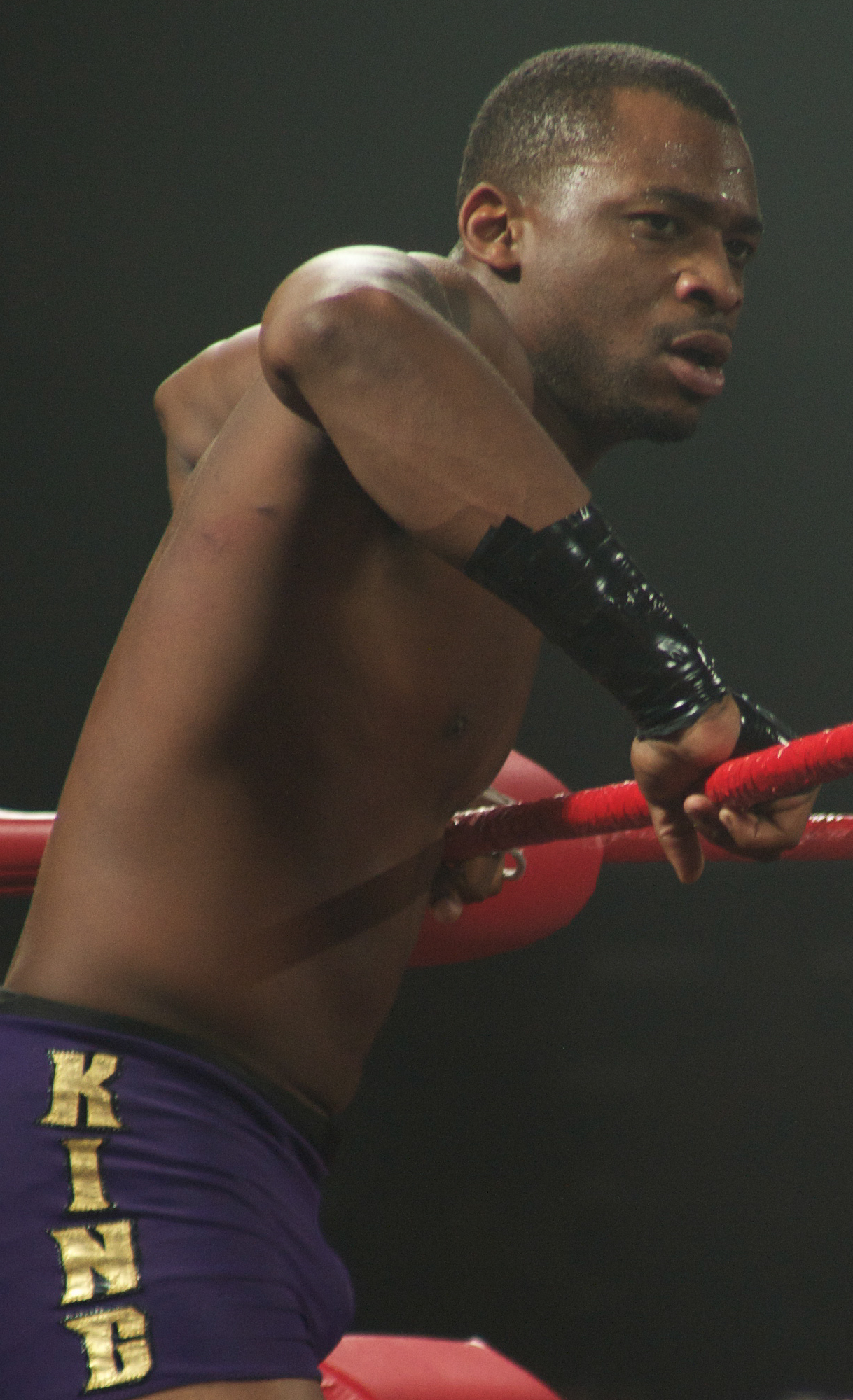
- King in 2011

Personal information
- Born: Kenneth Layne; July 22, 1981 (age 45) Queens, New York, U.S.
- Education: University of Nevada, Las Vegas

Professional wrestling career
- Ring name(s): Kenny; Kenny King; Kenny Layne
- Billed height: 6 ft 0 in (183 cm)
- Billed weight: 230 lb (104 kg)
- Billed from: Las Vegas, Nevada; Orlando, Florida
- Trained by: Al Snow; Chavo Guerrero Jr. Hardcore Holly; Ivory; Nick Bockwinkel; Scott Casey
- Debut: 2002

Kenneth Layne (born July 22, 1981) is an American professional wrestler, better known by his ring name, Kenny King. He is best known for his time with Ring of Honor (ROH) and Total Nonstop Action Wrestling (TNA) / Impact Wrestling.

After participating in the reality show WWE Tough Enough in 2002, Layne began a career in professional wrestling as Kenny King. From 2005 to 2006, he wrestled for TNA. In 2007, he began to work with ROH, where he teamed with Rhett Titus as the All Night Express, winning the ROH World Tag Team Championship. In 2012, King left ROH to rejoin TNA, where he won the TNA X Division Championship twice. In 2015, King returned to ROH, where he won the ROH World Television Championship two times and the ROH World Tag Team Championship twice more (with Dragon Lee as part of La Facción Ingobernable). In 2022, King again returned to TNA (since renamed Impact Wrestling) as part of the stable Honor No More, winning the Impact Digital Media Championship. He left Impact Wrestling once again in October 2023.

== Early life ==
Kenneth Layne was born on July 22, 1981, in Queens, New York. He grew up in Florida. He played football as a strong safety in college. Layne attended Florida State University, before transferring to the University of South Florida. He then relocated to Las Vegas, where he attended the University of Nevada, Las Vegas (UNLV). He had planned to play football at UNLV, but had to redshirt for his first season at the university.

== Professional wrestling career ==
=== Tough Enough (2002) ===
Layne tried out for the second season of the World Wrestling Federation's reality television program WWE Tough Enough after seeing an advertisement in 2002. While on the series, he was trained by Al Snow, Hardcore Holly, Chavo Guerrero Jr., and Ivory. Layne was one of the four finalists of the season, which was won by Jackie Gayda and Linda Miles.

=== Independent circuit (2002–2005) ===
Following Tough Enough, Layne began wrestling on the independent circuit immediately following Tough Enough. He trained under Nick Bockwinkel, and Scott Casey at the Las Vegas Wrestling Academy. In addition to wrestling under his own name, he also occasionally used the ring names "Tough Enough Kenny" and "Kenny King". Layne appeared with Ultimate Pro Wrestling in Anaheim, California on April 25, 2003. He defeated former The Real World cast member (and future Tough Enough contestant) Mike Mizanin in what was promoted as a "reality television match". In mid-2003 and early 2004 King worked for Revolution Pro Wrestling in Industry, California. Between 2003 and 2005 he worked for the Alternative Wrestling Show in California as "The Natural" Kenny King.

=== Total Nonstop Action Wrestling (2005–2006) ===
Layne debuted in Total Nonstop Action Wrestling (TNA) on the December 3, 2005, episode of TNA Impact!, losing to Abyss in a short squash match. He continued working for TNA throughout the end of 2005 and start of 2006, but failed to win a single match. He was used as a jobber both in singles and tag team competition, losing to wrestlers including Ron Killings, Lance Hoyt, and Monty Brown. In January 2006, he teamed with Buck Quartermaine to lose to the James Gang and Team 3D. Layne was released from TNA in August 2006.

=== Full Impact Pro (2006–2009) ===
For some of 2006 and most of 2007, King worked primarily for Full Impact Pro (FIP). He was part of the "Young, Rich and Ready For Action" (The YRR) stable with Chasyn Rance, Sal Rinauro, Steve Madison, Claudio Castagnoli and Daffney. On November 9, 2007, King and Jason Blade won the FIP Tag Team Championship by defeating the Briscoe Brothers (Jay and Mark). They reigned for over a year until December 20, 2008, when they lost the championship to Erick Stevens and Roderick Strong.

=== Ring of Honor (2007–2012) ===
==== Various storylines (2007–2008) ====
King made his Ring of Honor (ROH) debut at Motor City Madness 2007 on September 14, 2007, alongside his YRR teammate Chasyn Rance, when they defeated Mitch Franklin and Alex Payne in a tag team match. After the match, however, the YRR cut a promo, challenging the ROH wrestlers, which led to Bryan Danielson defeating both King and Rance in impromptu singles match. Over the next several months, King competed in tag team matches with some combination of Rance, Sal Rinauro, and Jason Blade to varying degrees of success. At Age of Insanity in August 2008, King challenged Danielson again, but was again unsuccessful, and he went on to lose to Kevin Steen at Night of the Butcher II and Jerry Lynn at Glory by Honor VII.

==== All Night Express (2009–2012) ====
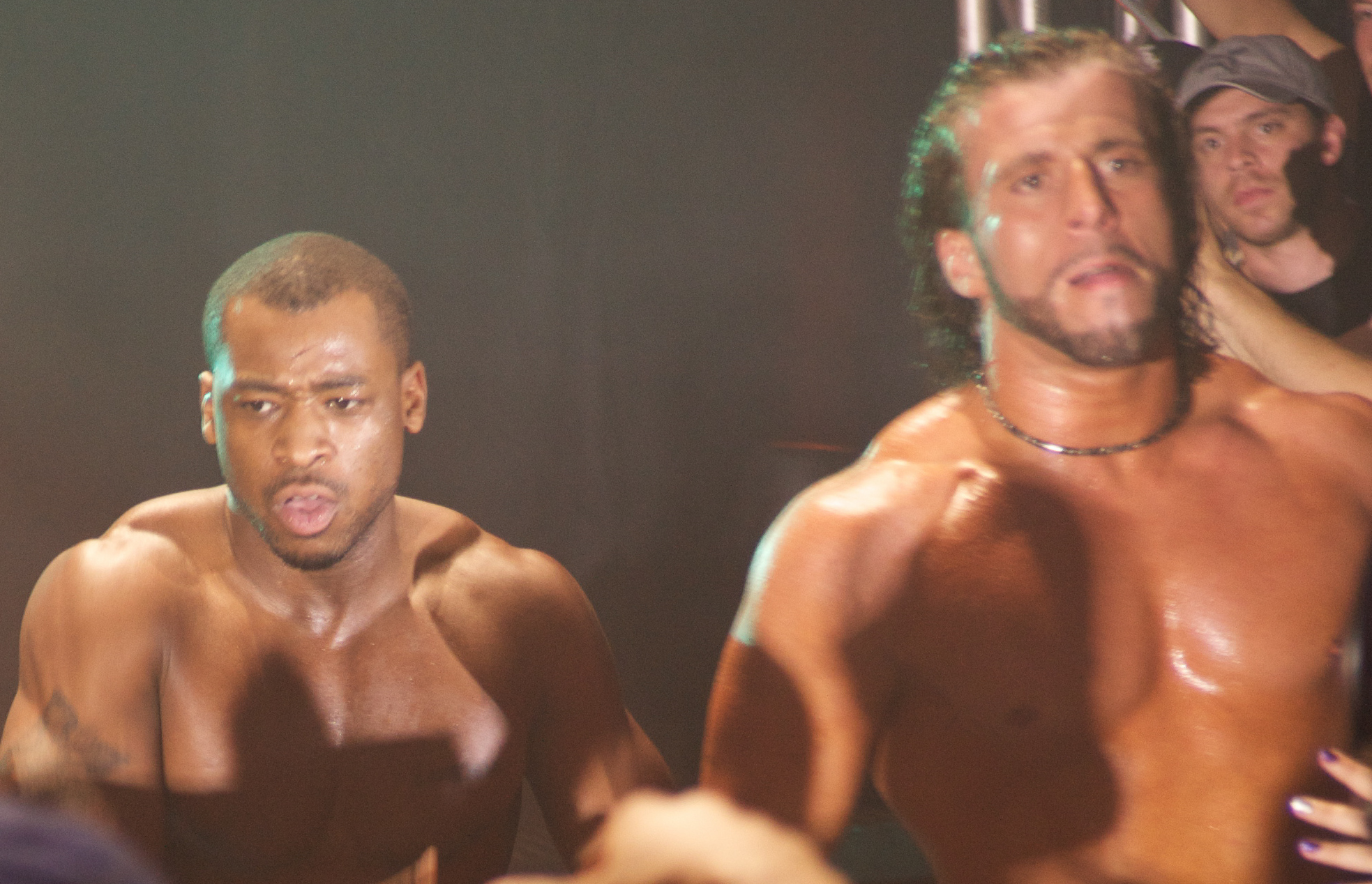
King (left) and Rhett Titus as the All Night Express in 2012

At The French Connection show, King tagged with Kenny Omega to face the Briscoe Brothers, but abandoned Omega halfway during the match, when Rhett Titus came to ringside. King and Titus left together, showing a new alliance between them. Over the next few months, King and Titus competed both in singles and tag team competition, and unsuccessfully challenged Kevin Steen and El Generico for the ROH World Tag Team Championship at Insanity Unleashed. At Steel City Clash, King and Titus revealed their alliance with Austin Aries, when they attacked Aries' former allies, Erick Stevens and Matt Cross, with Aries becoming a mentor to King and Titus.

The team garnered a second shot at the ROH World Tag Championship on ROH's television program, Ring of Honor Wrestling, and picked up a series of wins during the Double Feature II tour of Canada, and at the Never Say Die and Validation shows. King lost to Danielson once again in singles competition at Contention, and he and Titus were defeated by The Young Bucks at Manhattan Mayhem III. More wins followed at Violent Tendencies and End of an Age.

At the Ring of Honor Wrestling tapings on August 15, 2009, King beat Lynn. After the match, King and Titus attacked Lynn, and performed a spike piledriver on Lynn, removing Lynn from active competition. He continued on a winning streak, defeating Eddie Kingston and Brent Albright on Ring of Honor Wrestling, before he and Titus defeated The Young Bucks at Clash Of The Contenders. King was part of the initial matches to earn a place in the Pick 6 Conentenders Series rankings, but was unsuccessful. At the Final Battle 2009 pay-per-view, King defeated Roderick Strong and earned the number 4 ranking. On January 29, 2010, King faced Lynn, in Lynn's first match back. Lynn originally won the match, but attacked King after the match was over, causing the referee to reverse the decision, and award King the victory by disqualification. At The Big Bang! pay-per-view on April 3, King lost his Pick Six ranking to Davey Richards. On September 13, 2010, Ring of Honor announced that Layne had signed a contract extension with the promotion.

On November 12, 2010, King participated in ROH's Survival of the Fittest tournament. He defeated El Generico in the first round to advance to the final, a six-man elimination match, where he was the last man eliminated by Eddie Edwards. On December 18 at Final Battle 2010 the All Night Express defeated Adam Cole and Kyle O'Reilly, announcing their intention of becoming ROH World Tag Team Champions in 2011. On February 26, 2011, at the 9th Anniversary Show, King and Titus failed in their first attempt to win the ROH World Tag Team Championship, when they were defeated by The Kings of Wrestling (Chris Hero and Claudio Castagnoli). During the program with the Kings of Wrestling, King and Titus showed signs of a face turn and finalized their turn on March 19 at Manhattan Mayhem IV, after defeating the Briscoe Brothers. However, in a bloody rematch at the second show of Honor Takes Center Stage, The Briscoe Brothers won. On September 17 at Death Before Dishonor IX, the All Night Express defeated the Briscoe Brothers in a ladder match to become the number one contenders to the ROH World Tag Team Championship. On June 24 at Best in the World 2012: Hostage Crisis, King and Titus defeated Wrestling's Greatest Tag Team (Charlie Haas and Shelton Benjamin) to win the ROH World Tag Team Championship for the first time. After making an appearance for TNA, ROH severed its ties with King on July 5 and five days later officially stripped him and Titus of the ROH World Tag Team Championship.

When asked about his leaving ROH, King said that "I left because there was a bigger opportunity," and "I also left because I had given ROH what I felt was a long enough period of time to convince me to stay and they did a pretty piss poor job of that."

=== Total Nonstop Action Wrestling (2012–2015) ===
==== Pursuit of the X Division Championship (2012–2013) ====
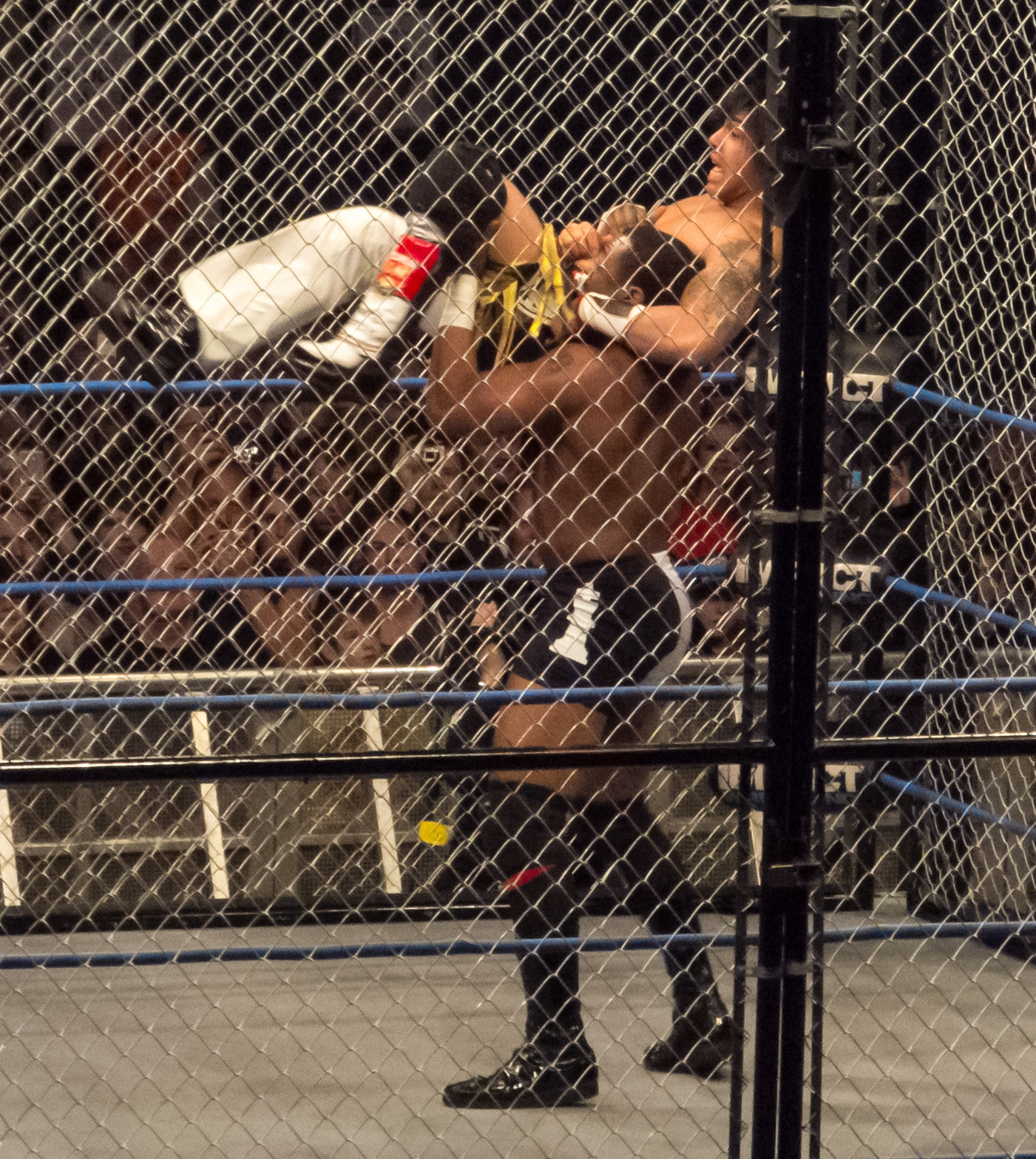
King (bottom) in a cage match against Zema Ion in 2013

On June 24, 2012, King's contract with ROH expired. the July 5 episode of TNA's Impact Wrestling, King wrestled in a match, defeating Lars Only to qualify for the TNA X Division Championship tournament at Destination X. Subsequently, ROH stated that they considered this an unacceptable "breach of his verbal agreement" and severed ties with him. On July 8 at Destination X, King defeated Douglas Williams to qualify for the finals of the X Division Championship tournament. Later that same event, King was defeated by Zema Ion in the final Ultimate X match, which also included Mason Andrews and Sonjay Dutt. King returned to Impact Wrestling on July 26, when he was handpicked by TNA World Heavyweight Champion Austin Aries as the number one contender to Zema Ion's X Division Championship. King ended up losing the match following interference from Aries' rival Bobby Roode. The following week, King teamed with Aries in a tag team match, where they defeated Ion and Roode, with King pinning the X Division Champion for the win. Following the match, King was named the number one contender to the X Division Championship. King received his title opportunity on August 12 at Hardcore Justice, but was defeated by Ion. The following day it was reported that King had signed a contract with TNA. On the December 6 episode of Impact Wrestling, King defeated Kid Kash and Zema Ion to become number one contender for the X Division Championship. Three days later at Final Resolution, King failed in his title challenge against Rob Van Dam. On the following episode of Impact Wrestling, King defeated Van Dam in a non-title match, pinning him with his feet on the ropes. The following week, King teased tension between himself and Van Dam after he abandoned Van Dam in a tag team match against Matt Morgan and Joey Ryan. On the January 10, 2013, episode of Impact Wrestling, King defeated Zema Ion to earn the right to face Christian York in a number one contenders match for the X Division Championship at Genesis. However, three days later at the pay-per-view, King was defeated by York. On the February 7 episode of Impact Wrestling, King unsuccessfully challenged Rob Van Dam for the X Division Championship in a three-way match, also involving Zema Ion. Two weeks later, King received another shot at the X Division Championship, but was again defeated by Van Dam.

On the February 28 episode of Impact Wrestling, King finally defeated Van Dam to win his first X Division Championship, in a match where if King had lost, he would have been out of the X Division. King made his first successful title defense on March 10 at Lockdown, defeating Christian York and Zema Ion in a three-way match. On the March 21 episode of Impact Wrestling, King defeated Sonjay Dutt and Zema Ion in a three-way match to retain the X Division Championship. King then defended the title against Petey Williams and Zema Ion on the April 18 episode of Impact Wrestling and against Williams and Chris Sabin on the May 16 episode. On June 2 at Slammiversary XI, King lost the X Division Championship to Chris Sabin in a three-way Ultimate X match, also involving Suicide. King lost his rematch on the June 27 episode of Impact Wrestling, after he was pinned by an impostor Suicide (later revealed to be Austin Aries) in a three-way match, which also included then-champion Chris Sabin and removed him from the title contention. King returned on the September 26 episode of Impact to confront Aries over the fake Suicide stunt, and after attacking Aries, Aries ordered a match right afterwards, which Aries won, and left King with a bad cut on his forehead.

==== Beat Down Clan; X Division Champion (2014–2015) ====
On the March 20 edition of Impact Wrestling, a promo for King's return was announced, dubbing him a new nickname "King of the Night". The following week King returned to television as a heel requesting a match from MVP. The week after, King wrestled his first televised match in over six months against MVP which ended in a no-contest after the two started brawling, igniting a feud. King continued to antagonize MVP over the next several weeks until MVP turned heel on the May 5 edition of Impact, the following week after which the two formed an alliance alongside Bobby Lashley.

Over the next few editions of Impact, King became a member of the higher-card status of the roster, attacking people such as The Wolves, Bobby Roode and Eric Young. On the June 19 edition of Impact King was given a match against Young for his first shot at the TNA World Heavyweight Championship. King lost, but helped Lashley defeat Young for the title later that night. On September 17, 2014, King and MVP antagonized former Army Sergeant and amputee wrestler Chris Melendez on his debut, resulting in a match in which King lost to Melendez and a post-match attack by King which was stopped by Mr. Anderson.

On September 18, 2014, at the tapings for the October 28 edition of Impact Wrestling, Lashley lost the World Heavyweight Championship to Roode. On January 7, 2015, King and MVP helped Lashley beat Roode to regain the championship, along with new members Samoa Joe and Low Ki as well as Roode's friend Eric Young turning on him. On the following night's tapings of the January 16, 2015, episode of Impact Wrestling, the group was officially presented as the Beat Down Clan, with the trio of MVP, Lashley and King established as having been its foundation; however, Lashley refused to act as the new unit's centerpiece, resulting in King joining the others in attacking Lashley on MVP's orders.

At Impact: Hardcore Justice, Kenny King won a ladder match to begin his second reign as X Division Champion. On May 11, 2015, King lost the X Division Championship against Spud. On June 24, 2015, (aired July 1) Beat Down Clan defeated The Rising in a 4-on-3 Handicap match, forcing The Rising to dissolve. Also, Hernandez made his return to TNA, joining BDC in the progress. The Beat Down Clan was quickly dissolved after contract disputes with Hernandez and MVP and King was taken off television.

After a two-month hiatus, King made his TNA return on the September 2 episode of Impact Wrestling, King went one on one against and lost to Bram in a losing effort. On September 23 episode of Impact Wrestling. King received a shot at the X Division Championship against Tigre Uno which he lost. After the match King left TNA.

After the Beat Down Clan dissolved, all members left TNA with the exception of King. He returned to a full-time TNA schedule and competed in 'Group Wildcard' in the TNA World Title Series along with Mahabali Shera, Crazzy Steve and Aiden O'Shea. The series and the subsequent tournament were taped in July and aired on Impact throughout the later part of 2015, after King had already returned to Ring of Honor. Due to his success in group play, King qualified for the 16-person World Championship tournament, but he was defeated in the first round by Eric Young, failing to qualify for the round of 8, In September 2015, Kenny King left TNA, confirming his departure from the company.

=== Ring of Honor (2015–2022, 2024) ===
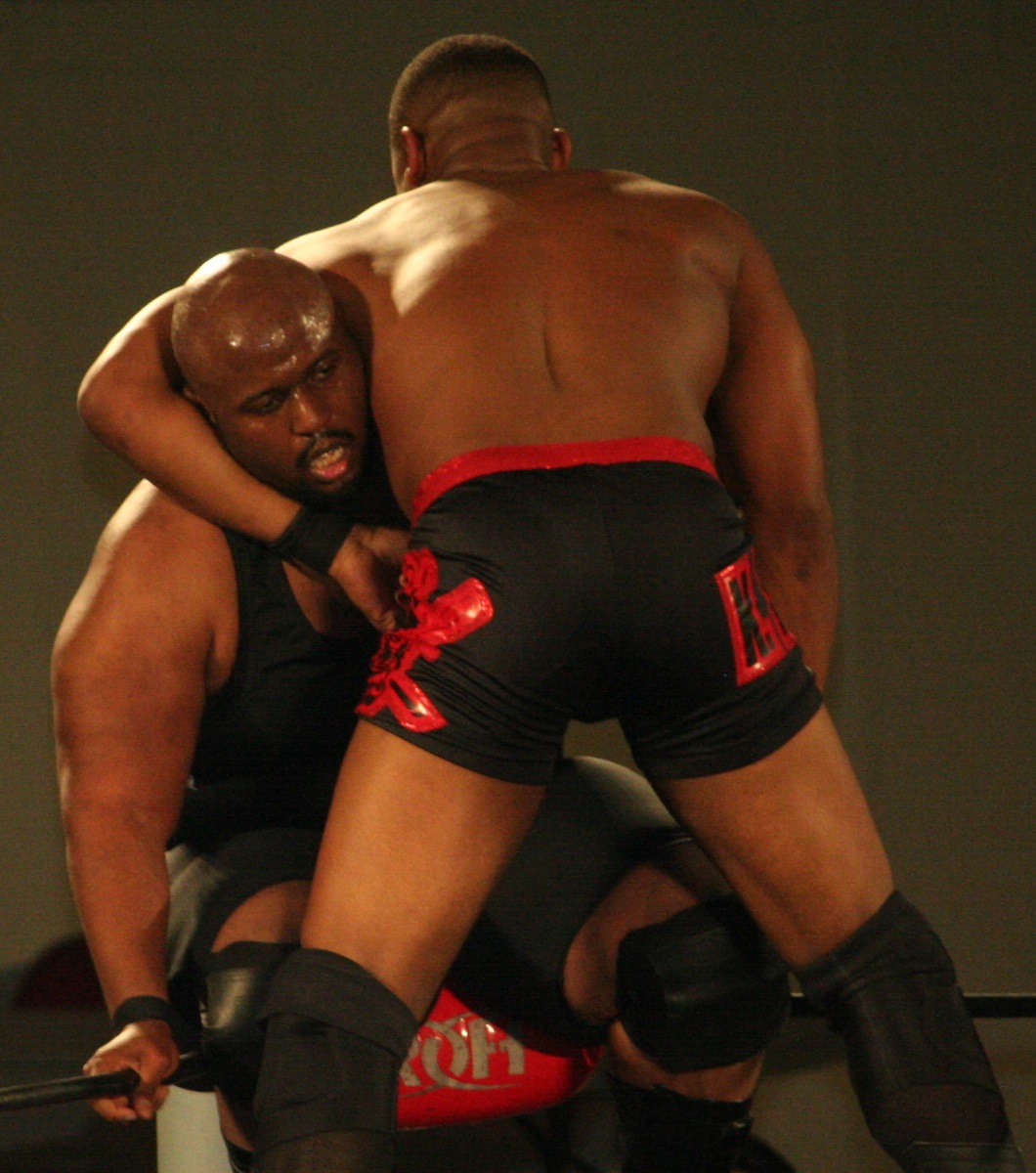
King (right) superplexing Shane Taylor in 2017

King made a surprise return to ROH on September 18, 2015, at All Star Extravaganza VII, reuniting with his All Night Express partner Rhett Titus in a tag team match, where they defeated the Briscoe Brothers.

In 2016, All Night Express united with Caprice Coleman to form an alliance known as the Cabinet. The Cabinet overcame Jason Kincaid, Leon St. Giovanni, and Shaheem Ali in the first round of the ROH World Six-Man Tag Team Championship tournament, only to meet defeat at the hands of A. C. H., Jay White, and Kushida. The Cabinet was originally portrayed as something not be taken seriously, but in late 2016, the trio turned serious and renamed themselves "The Rebellion", eventually also adding Shane Taylor as a member. The Rebellion remained together until June 2017, when they were defeated by Search and Destroy in a match, where the losing team had to disband. This signaled both a singles push for King and a face turn.

On September 22 at Death Before Dishonor XV, King defeated Kushida to win the ROH World Television Championship for the first time. On December 15, 2017, at Final Battle Kenny King lost the ROH Television Title in a Fatal 4 Way elimination match against Silas Young, Shane Taylor and Punishment Martinez. However, King regained the title on February 10, 2018. King lost the title at Supercard of Honor XII to Silas Young in a Last Man Standing match.

In mid 2018, King began to make a slow heel turn, starting with cheating to beat Bullet Club member Marty Scurll. In the following weeks, King also defeated Chase Owens and "Hangman" Adam Page with similar underhanded tactics, leading King to call himself the Bullet Club "silencer."

In late 2019, King had joined with Rush and Dragon Lee to form the heel stable La Faccion Ingobernable (later joined by La Bestia del Ring). ROH was on hiatus through the better part of 2020 due to the COVID-19 pandemic, but in 2021, King and Lee would defeat The Foundation (Jay Lethal and Jonathan Gresham) to win the ROH World Tag Team Championship in a Pure Rules match that was aired on the February 27 episode of Ring of Honor Wrestling. This marked King's second reign as Tag Team Champions.

On February 15, 2024, King returned to ROH for HonorClub where King lost to Dalton Castle.

=== Consejo Mundial de Lucha Libre (2017) ===
On August 9, 2017, Mexican promotion Consejo Mundial de Lucha Libre (CMLL) announced Kenny would replace King Haku because of immigration complications, making his debut for the promotion in the 2017 CMLL International Gran Prix. On September 1, King was eliminated from the International Gran Prix torneo cibernetico by Valiente.

=== Impact Wrestling (2022–2023) ===
On the February 3, 2022, episode of Impact!, King made his return to Impact Wrestling, as a member of Honor No More. On June 19, at Slammiversary, he competed in an Ultimate X match for the X Division Championship, which was won by Mike Bailey.

On January 19, 2023, since his second return he also faced Mike Bailey in a No Ropes PIT FIGHT Knockout or Submission ONLY match but was not successful. Kenny also faced Kevin Knight in a one-on-one match on March 2, and was successful.

On July 15 at Slammiversary, King defeated Joe Hendry to win the Impact Digital Media Championship. On August 20 at Multiverse United 2, King made his first successful title defense against Yoshinobu Kanemaru. On August 27 at Emergence, Kenny successfully defended the Impact Digital Media Championship against Johnny Swinger. On September 8 at Victory Road, King lost the championship to Tommy Dreamer in a Title vs. Career match, ending his reign at 55 days. at Bound for Glory, King competed in the 20-person Intergender Call Your Shot Gauntlet which was won by Jordynne Grace.

His last match pretaped took place on the November 16 episode of Impact where King and Sheldon Jean lost to ABC (Chris Bey and Ace Austin) failing to win the Impact World Tag Team Championship. He left Impact on November 16, 2023.

=== Independent circuit (2024–present) ===
After leaving TNA, King returned to wrestling on the Independent scene.

== Personal life ==
Layne has a daughter. He is of Guyanese heritage through his father.

== Other media ==
On July 22, 2003, Layne appeared in the television program The Strip as "Felix" in the episode "Father's Day Blues". Layne also appeared on the short lived Nickelodeon series, My Brother and Me on the episode titled "Dee Dee's Haircut". He was in season 2 episode 15 of The Real Housewives of Beverly Hills appearing as a Chippendale's dancer in Las Vegas. Layne appeared on the dating game show Baggage on March 9, 2011; he was one of three potential men for the female contestant to choose. He lasted until the final elimination round. Layne was announced as a contestant on the 13th season of The Bachelorette, which premiered in May 2017. He pulled himself out of the competition in ninth place as he was missing his daughter. On June 26, 2018, it was announced that Layne will be on the 5th season of Bachelor in Paradise.

== Championships and accomplishments ==
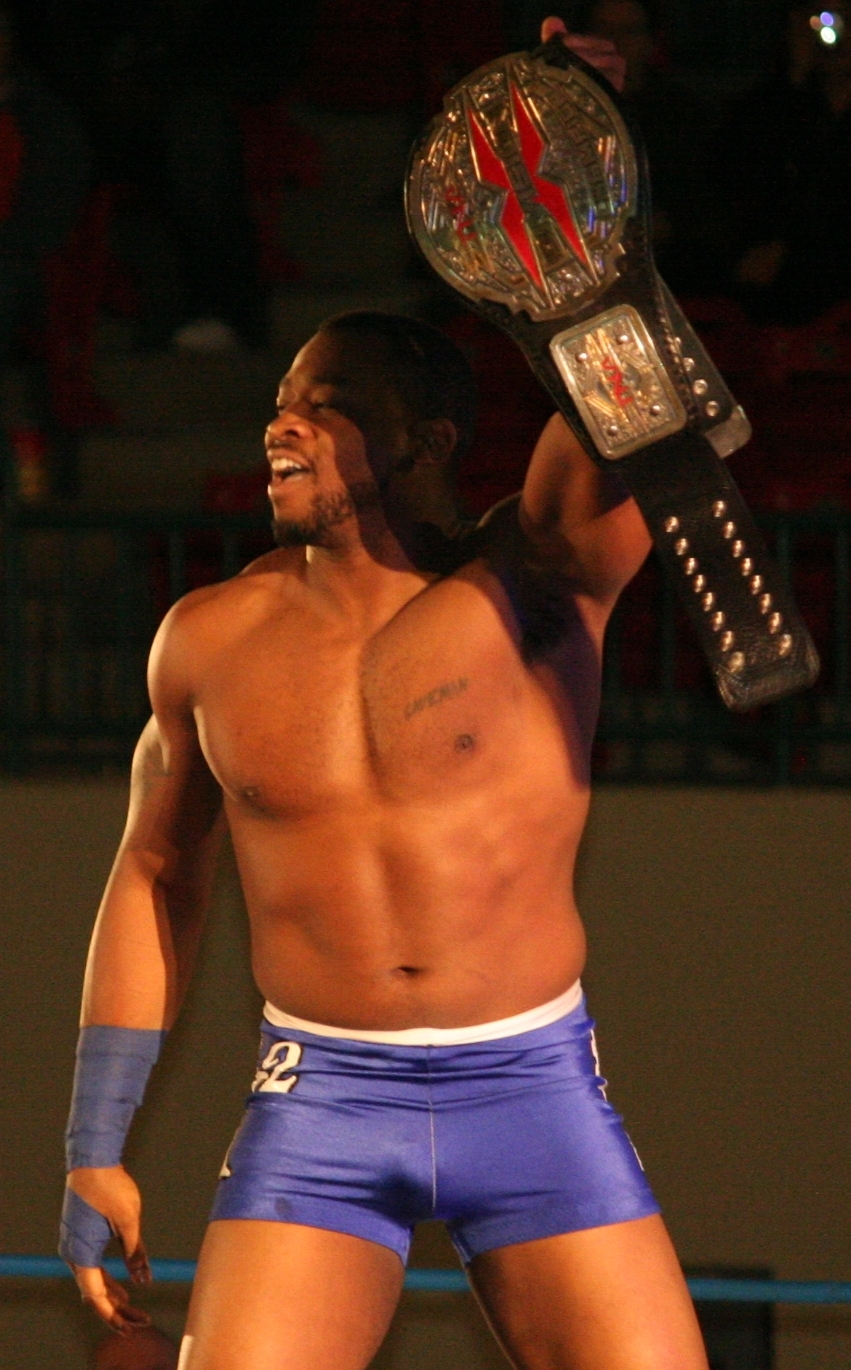
King is a two-time TNA X Division Champion

- Alliance Wrestling Force
  - AWF Florida Championship (1 time, inaugural)
- Full Impact Pro
  - FIP Tag Team Championship (1 time) – with Jason Blade
- Future Stars of Wrestling
  - FSW Heavyweight Championship (1 time, inaugural)
  - FSW Elite Championship (1 time, inaugural, final)
  - FSW Tag Team Championships (1 time) – with Shogun Jones
- Pro Wrestling Illustrated
  - Ranked No. 36 of the top 500 singles wrestlers in the PWI 500 in 2013
- Ring of Honor
  - ROH World Television Championship (2 times)
  - ROH World Tag Team Championship (3 times) – with Rhett Titus (1 time) and Dragon Lee (2 times)
  - Honor Rumble (2019)
- Ultimate Wrestling Federation
  - UWF Vegas Heavyweight Championship (1 time)
- Total Nonstop Action Wrestling / Impact Wrestling
  - Impact Digital Media Championship (1 time)
  - TNA X Division Championship (2 times)
  - TNA World Cup of Wrestling (2013) – with Christopher Daniels, James Storm, Kazarian and Mickie James
