= Multiverse United 2 =

Co-promoted professional wrestling pay-per-view event series

- Promotional poster
- Promotion(s): Impact Wrestling; New Japan Pro-Wrestling
- Date: August 20, 2023
- City: Philadelphia, Pennsylvania
- Venue: 2300 Arena
- Attendance: 665
- Tagline: For Whom the Bell Tolls

Pay-per-view chronology
← Previous; Impact: Slammiversary; NJPW: All Star Junior Festival USA	Next → Impact: Bound for Glory; NJPW: Road to Destruction

Multiverse chronology
← Previous; Multiverse United	Next → —

Multiverse United 2 (marketed as Multiverse United 2: For Whom the Bell Tolls) was an interpromotional professional wrestling pay-per-view event co-produced by Impact Wrestling and New Japan Pro-Wrestling (NJPW). It took place on August 20, 2023, at the 2300 Arena in Philadelphia, Pennsylvania and aired on FITE. It was the third event under the Multiverse chronology.

Ten matches were contested at the event, including two on the pre-show. In the main event, Alex Shelley defeated Hiroshi Tanahashi to retain the Impact World Championship. In other prominent matches, Giulia defeated Deonna Purrazzo, Gisele Shaw and Momo Kohgo to retain the Strong Women's Championship, Sami Callihan defeated Douki in a South Philly Street Fight, Bullet Club (Kenta, ABC (Ace Austin and Chris Bey) and Bullet Club War Dogs (Alex Coughlin, Clark Connors and David Finlay)) defeated The World (The DKC, El Phantasmo, Josh Alexander, PCO and Guerrillas of Destiny (Tama Tonga and Tanga Loa)) in a 12-man tag team match, Trey Miguel and Lio Rush defeated Hiromu Takahashi and Mike Bailey; and in the opening contest, Chris Sabin defeated Yoh, Bushi, El Desperado, Frankie Kazarian, Kevin Knight, Mao and Rich Swann in an Júnior Heavyweight/X Division eight-man Scramble match.

== Production ==
=== Background ===
Multiverse is a professional wrestling event promoted by Impact Wrestling. The first event, Multiverse of Matches took place on April 1, 2022, at the Fairmount Hotel in Dallas, Texas. The second event, Multiverse United, took place on March 30, 2023, at the Globe Theater in Los Angeles, California, thus establishing the Multiverse event as an annual tradition. On April 16, 2023, at Rebellion, it was announced that Multiverse United 2 would take place on August 20, 2023, in Philadelphia, Pennsylvania.

=== Storylines ===
The event will feature several professional wrestling matches, which involve different wrestlers from pre-existing scripted feuds, plots, and storylines. Wrestlers portray heroes, villains, or less distinguishable characters in scripted events that build tension and culminate in a wrestling match or series of matches. Storylines are produced on Impact's weekly television program.

== Event ==
Other on-screen personnel
Role:	Name:
Commentators	Tom Hannifan
Commentators	Matthew Rehwoldt
Commentators	Veda Scott
Ring announcers	Takuro Shibata
Ring announcers	Alyssa Marino
Referees	Daniel Spencer
Referees	Allison Leigh
Referees	Frank Gastineau
Referees	Red Shoes Unno

=== Pre-show ===
There were two matches that took place on the pre-show. In the opener, Joe Hendry, Heath and Yuya Uemura faced Six or Nine (Ryusuke Taguchi and Master Wato) and Rocky Romero. In the closing stages, Wato delivered a ZigZag to Hendry, but Heath then delivered a leg lariat to Wato. Hendry then delivered simultaneous Fallaway Slams to Romero and Wato. Uemura then delivered a running bulldog and a diving crossbody to Taguchi for the three-count.

In the main event of the pre-show, Kenny King defended the Impact Digital Media Championship against Yoshinobu Kanemaru. In the closing stages, Kanemaru delivered a spinebuster and a standing moonsault for a two-count. King then delivered a spinebuster for a two-count. Kanemaru then pulled the referee away, attempting to deliver the Amber Mist, but King avoided it and delivered the Royal Flush to retain the title.

=== Preliminary matches ===
The opening contest of the event was an Júnior Heavyweight/X Division eight-man Scramble contested between Chris Sabin, Yoh, Frankie Kazarian, Kevin Knight, Bushi, Mao, El Desperado and Rich Swann. In the opening stages, Kazarian delivered a diving legdrop to Sabin. Desperado then delivered a cutter to Mao. Sabin and Kazarian then delivered a Tower of Doom to Mao, Swann and Desperado. Knight then delivered a frog splash to Swann, but Yoh broke up the pinfall. Kazarian then delivered a slingshot cutter to Knight, but Desperado then immediately delivered a spinebuster to Kazarian, allowing Sabin to deliver the Cradle Shock to Yoh for the win. After the match, Bushi sprayed mist into Sabin's eyes.

Next, Moose and Eddie Edwards faced TMDK (Shane Haste and Zack Sabre Jr.). In the closing stages, Edwards delivered a Blue Thunder Bomb to Sabre Jr. for a two-count. As Haste was attempting a suplex, Moose countered it into a uranage. Edwards then delivered the Boston Knee Party to Sabre Jr., but Haste then delivered a schoolboy pin to Moose for a two-count. Moose then delivered a Spear to Haste to pick up the victory.

In the next match, Giulia defended the Strong Openweight Championship against Gisele Shaw, Deonna Purrazzo and Momo Kohgo. In the opening stages, Kohgo delivered a diving crossbody and a 619 to Giulia. As Purrazzo was attempting the Queen's Gambit, Shaw countered it into a back body drop. Giulia then delivered an avalanche butterfly suplex to Shaw. Purrazzo then delivered a lungblower to Kohgo. Shaw then delivered an avalanche Spanish Fly to Purrazzo, but Kohgo and Giulia broke up the pinfall attempt. Giulia then delivered a Northern Lights Bomb to Shaw to retain the title. After the match, Kohgo attacked Giulia, but Giulia delivered the Glorious Driver to Kohgo.

The next match was a South Philly Street Fight contested between Sami Callihan and Douki. In the closing stages, Douki delivered an enzeguiri and a diving double foot stomp onto a pile of chairs for a two-count. Callihan then delivered a twisting neckbreaker for a nearfall. Douki them delivered a hurricarana into a ladder and a slingshot DDT for a two-count. As Douki was attempting the Douki Bomb, Callihan escaped it and delivered a lariat and the Cactus Driver '97 for another nearfall. As Callihan was attempting another Cactus Driver'97 onto a pile of chairs, Douki escaped it, but Callihan then delivered a low blow and the Cactus Driver '97 for the win.

Next, Catch 2/2 (TJP and Francesco Akira) faced TMDK (Kosei Fujita and Robbie Eagles). In the closing stages, Akira delivered an assisted senton to Fujita for a two-count. Akira them delivered a poison Rana to Eagles. Fujita then locked in a leg lock on Akira, but Akira reached the ropes. Akira then delivered a step-up tope con giro to both Fujita and Eagles on the outside. TJP them delivered a frog splash to Fujita for a two-count. Fujita then delivered a belly-to-belly suplex to TJP for another two-count. As Eagles was attempting a superkick to Akira, Eagles accidentally superkicked Fujita, allowing TJP and Akira to deliver simultaneous knees to Fujita to pickup the victory.

The next bout was a 12-man tag team match contested between Bullet Club (Kenta, Chris Bey, Ace Austin, Clark Connors, Alex Coughlin and David Finlay) and The World (The DKC, El Phantasmo, Josh Alexander, PCO, Tama Tonga and Tanga Loa). In the opening stages, Coughlin delivered a gutwrench suplex to PCO. Connors them delivered a powerslam to DKC for a two-count. Austin then delivered a headscissors takedown to Alexander. El Phantasmo delivered a springboard moonsault to Finlay, but Austin broke up the pin attempt. PCO and The DKC then delivered a chokeslam/diving splash combination to Finlay for a two-count. PCO then delivered the PCO-sault to everyone on the outside. Alexander then delivered a double suplex to both Austin and Bey. As Kenta was attempting the GTS, Alexander countered it into an ankle lock, but Kenta escaped it. As The DKC was attempting another diving splash, Finlay got the knees up and delivered a powerbomb to The DKC to win. The match. After the match, Bullet Club attacked all the members of The World.

In the penultimate match, Trey Miguel and Lio Rush took on Hiromu Takahashi and Mike Bailey in a tag team match. In the closing stages, Rush delivered a fisherman driver to Bailey for a two-count. Takahashi then delivered a falcon Arrow to Miguel for a two-count. Takahashi then delivered a pop-up powerbomb to Miguel, but as Takahashi was attempting a superkick, Miguel avoided it into a schoolboy pin for a two-count. Takahashi and Bailey then delivered a fireman's carry/Ultima Weapon combination on Miguel, but Rush broke up the pin attempt. Rush then delivered a springboard stunner to Takahashi for nearfall. As Takahashi was attempting the Time Bomb, Miguel blocked it and delivered a Meteora. Takahashi then delivered a Death Valley Driver, but as he was attempting to pin Rush, Miguel distracted the referee, allowing Rush to deliver a low blow to Takahashi and use a schoolboy pin for the win.

=== Main event ===
In the main event, Alex Shelley defended the Impact World Championship against Hiroshi Tanahashi. In the opening stages, Shelley delivered Sliced Bread #2 and locked in the Border City Stretch, but Tanahashi reached the ropes. Shelley then kicked Tanahashi's hand into the barricade and delivered a running clothesline. Tanahashi then delivered a dragonscrew in the ropes, but Shelley then delivered an enzeguiri. Tanahashi then delivered three Twist and Shouts and a slingblade for a two-count. Shelley then delivered the Boma Ye, a ripcord lariat and The Rainmaker for a nearfall. Shelley then delivered an avalanche Air Raid Crash for another two-count. Shelley then delivered a superkick and the Shell Shock to retain the title.

== Results ==
No.	Results	Stipulations	Times
1^{P}	Joe Hendry, Heath and Yuya Uemura defeated Six or Nine (Ryusuke Taguchi and Master Wato) and Rocky Romero by pinfall	Six-man tag team match	10:21
2^{P}	Kenny King (c) defeated Yoshinobu Kanemaru by pinfall	Singles match for the Impact Digital Media Championship	6:58
3	Chris Sabin defeated Yoh, Bushi, El Desperado, Frankie Kazarian, Kevin Knight, Mao and Rich Swann by pinfall	Júnior Heavyweight/X Division Eight-way Scramble	8:10
4	Eddie Edwards and Moose defeated TMDK (Shane Haste and Zack Sabre Jr.) by pinfall	Tag team match	13:24
5	Giulia (c) defeated Gisele Shaw, Deonna Purrazzo and Momo Kohgo by pinfall	Four-way match for the Strong Women's Championship	12:22
6	Sami Callihan defeated Douki by pinfall	South Philly Street Fight	12:54
7	Catch 2/2 (Francesco Akira and TJP) defeated TMDK (Kosei Fujita and Robbie Eagles) by pinfall	Tag team match	11:30
8	Bullet Club (Kenta, ABC (Ace Austin and Chris Bey) and Bullet Club War Dogs (Alex Coughlin, Clark Connors and David Finlay)) defeated The World (The DKC, El Phantasmo, Josh Alexander, PCO and Guerrillas of Destiny (Tama Tonga and Tanga Loa)) by pinfall	12-man tag team match	14:13
9	Trey Miguel and Lio Rush defeated Hiromu Takahashi and Mike Bailey by pinfall	Tag team match	14:32
10	Alex Shelley (c) defeated Hiroshi Tanahashi by pinfall	Singles match for the Impact World Championship	18:56
(c) / – the champion(s) heading into the match; P / – the match was broadcast on the pre-show
