= Bound for Glory (2023) =

2023 Impact Wrestling pay-per-view event

- Promotion: Impact Wrestling
- Date: October 21, 2023
- City: Cicero, Illinois
- Venue: Cicero Stadium
- Attendance: 1,000

Pay-per-view chronology
← Previous; Multiverse United 2	Next → Hard To Kill

Bound for Glory chronology
← Previous; 2022	Next → 2024

The 2023 Bound for Glory was a professional wrestling pay-per-view (PPV) event produced by Impact Wrestling. It took place on October 21, 2023, at Cicero Stadium in Cicero, Illinois. It was the 19th event under the Bound for Glory chronology, and the second to be held in the Chicago area, following the 2019 event. The event also featured various wrestlers from partner promotion New Japan Pro-Wrestling (NJPW).

Eight matches were contested at the event, including one taped for an episode of Impact Main Event Mondays. In the main event, Alex Shelley defeated Josh Alexander to retain the Impact World Championship. In other prominent matches, Trinity defeated Mickie James to retain the Impact Knockouts World Championship, Will Ospreay defeated Mike Bailey, and in the opening contest, Chris Sabin defeated Kenta to retain the Impact X Division Championship.

The event was notable for the Impact Wrestling debut of Sonny Kiss, and the returns of Juventud Guerrera and Matt Cardona. The event was also the final pay-per-view under the Impact Wrestling banner, as the promotion reverted to the revived moniker of Total Nonstop Action Wrestling at Hard To Kill.

== Production ==
=== Background ===
Bound for Glory is a professional wrestling pay-per-view (PPV) event produced by Impact Wrestling. The event was created in 2005 to serve as the company's flagship PPV event, similar to WWE's WrestleMania, in which wrestlers competed in various professional wrestling match types in what was the culmination of many feuds and storylines that occurred during the calendar year. On January 25, 2023, it was announced by Impact Wrestling that Bound for Glory would take place on October 21, 2023, at Cicero Stadium in Cicero, Illinois, a suburb just outside Chicago.

=== Storylines ===
The event featured several professional wrestling matches, which involve different wrestlers from pre-existing scripted feuds, plots, and storylines. Wrestlers portrayed heroes, villains, or less distinguishable characters in scripted events that build tension and culminate in a wrestling match or series of matches. Storylines are produced on Impact's weekly television program.

At Emergence, Impact announced that NJPW's IWGP United States Heavyweight Champion Will Ospreay will return to the company at Bound for Glory. His opponent was later revealed as Mike Bailey on Week 2 of Impact! 1000, a match that was originally scheduled for Multiverse United in March before Ospreay sustained an injury.

On the April 6 episode of Impact!, due to a torn triceps, Josh Alexander was forced to vacate the Impact World Championship. In his absence, Steve Maclin and later Alex Shelley would hold the title, with Alexander returning to confront Shelley at the end of Slammiversary. In the following weeks, Shelley took exception to Alexander calling the Impact World Championship "his" title, since he was never beaten for it. The two would continue to be reluctant allies, however, Shelley would at points abandon Alexander whenever the latter was in trouble, such as at Emergence. On Week 2 of Impact! 1000, Impact announced that Alexander will challenge Shelley for the Impact World Championship at Bound for Glory.

On the September 28 Impact!, after Chris Sabin retained the Impact X Division Championship against Alan Angels, a video package played announcing the Impact return of Kenta at Bound for Glory. Later in the night, Impact announced that Sabin will defend the X Division title against Kenta at the event.

On the April 13 Impact!, Mickie James was forced to vacate the Impact Knockouts World Championship due to a broken rib. Deonna Purrazzo and Trinity would become champion in James' absence. On Week 1 of Impact! 1000, James made her return from the injury, teaming with current champion Trinity to win a 10-Knockout tag team match on Week 2. Although during the post-match celebration, James was noticeably eyeing Trinity's title belt. On the following week's episode, Trinity defeated Gisele Shaw in a non-title main event, before being ambushed by Shaw and the SHAWntourage (Savannah Evans and Jai Vidal). However, James would emerge to help the champion fend off Shaw's associates. James later spoke to Trinity about how she earned her title but reminded her that she never lost it herself. James would challenge Trinity to a Knockouts World Championship match at Bound for Glory, which Impact made official on their website.

On the September 28 episode of Impact!, the Call Your Shot Gauntlet was announced for Bound for Glory, with the winner as always earning a trophy they can use to invoke a championship opportunity of their choice at any time and place. A ten-person tag team match would be announced for the following week, with Champagne Singh, Dirty Dango, Eric Young, Jake Something, and Jordynne Grace defeating Bully Ray, Brian Myers, Shera, Jody Threat, and KiLynn King. The following week, the five of them would go on to face each other, where Dango – with help from Oleg Prudius (formerly Vladimir Kozlov in WWE) – pinned Something to earn the last entry spot in the gauntlet match, and Something was forced into the first entry spot.

At Slammiversary, ABC (Ace Austin and Chris Bey) defended their Impact World Tag Team Championship against Brian Myers and Moose, Rich Swann and Sami Callihan, and Subculture (Mark Andrews and Flash Morgan Webster). At the closing moments of the match, The Rascalz (Trey Miguel and Zachary Wentz) appeared and neutralized ABC from the match, allowing Andrews to pin Myers and Subculture to win the titles. On the subsequent episode of Impact!, ABC invoked their rematch clause to challenge Subculture for the titles, but lost once again due to interference from the Rascalz. At Emergence, The Rascalz would defeat Subculture to win the tag team titles, when outside interference from Dani Luna, ABC and The Good Hands (John Skyler and Jason Hotch) allowed Miguel to blind Webster with spray paint before pinning him. On the first week of Impact! 1000, Bey competed in the Feast or Fired match, securing Briefcase 3, which contained a tag team title opportunity. On October 5, Impact announced that Bey and Austin would invoke this opportunity at Bound for Glory for the Impact World Tag Team Championship. On the October 12 Impact!, The Rascalz successfully defended the titles against Rich Swann and Sami Callihan, now going on to face ABC at Bound for Glory.

== Event ==
Other on-screen personnel
Role:	Name:
Commentators	Tom Hannifan
Commentators	Matthew Rehwoldt
Ring announcer	David Penzer
Referees	Daniel Spencer
Referees	Allison Leigh
Referees	Frank Gastineau
Interviewer	Gia Miller

=== Preliminary matches ===
In the opening contest, Chris Sabin defended the Impact X Division Championship against Kenta. In the opening stages, Sabin delivered a diving crossbody for a two-count. Sabin then delivered a missile dropkick and a tornado DDT for a two-count. Kenta then delivered a draping DDT and a corner dropkick. Kenta then delivered a diving double foot stomp to Sabin for a two-count. As Kenta wanted to attempt the GTS, Sabin escaped and delivered a superkick and a step-up enzeguiri. Sabin then delivered the Clothesline from Hell, Michigan and the Cradle Shock for the three-count.

The next match was a Monster's Ball match contested between PCO, Moose, Rhino and Steve Maclin. In the opening stages, Maclin hit PCO with a trashcan and delivered a bodyslam to him onto a ladder. PCO then delivered a tope atomico and a diving leg drop to Maclin for a two-count. Moose then delivered a chokeslam to PCO onto thumbtacks on cinder blocks. Rhino then delivered a clothesline to Maclin and the Gore for a nearfall. As Maclin wanted to attempt a diving attack on Rhino, Bully Ray then came out and pushed Maclin through a barbed wire table. Moose then hit PCO with a chair, allowing Rhino to deliver the Gore to Moose. PCO then delivered the PCOsault on Moose and pinned him for the win.

In the next match, The Rascalz (Zachary Wentz and Trey Miguel) defended the Impact World Tag Team Championship against ABC (Chris Bey and Ace Austin). In the closing stages, Trey delivered an apron neckbreaker to Austin for a two-count. Bey then delivered a brainbuster to Wentz for a two-count. Miguel and Wentz then delivered a meteora/diving double stomp for a two-count. As Wentz was arguing with the referee, he unintentionally used a spray can and sprayed Miguel in the eyes. Bey then delivered a superkick to Miguel, allowing Bey and Austin to deliver the 1-2-Sweet (Art of Finesse/The Fold combination) on Wentz to win the tag team championship.

In the next match, Will Ospreay faced Mike Bailey. In the opening stages, Bailey delivered a moonsault onto the outside to Ospreay. Ospreay then delivered a big boot and a diving crossbody for a two-count. Ospreay then delivered a forearm smash and a superkick for a two-count. As Ospreay wanted to attempt a bucklebomb, Bailey countered it into a backslide pin for a two-count. Bailey then delivered a poisonrana and the Ultima Weapon to Ospreay for a nearfall. Ospreay then delivered the Styles Clash and the Oscutter for a nearfall. As Bailey wanted to attempt the Flamingo Driver, Ospreay escaped and delivered a Storm Driver '93 for another nearfall. Ospreay then delivered the Hidden Blade and the Storm Breaker for the three-count.

The next match was a Call Your Shot Gauntlet match. The first participants were Jake Something and Eddie Edwards. The returning Juventud Guerrera then came out and #4 and a double DDT to Edwards and Kenny King, who came out at #3. Guerrera then clotheslined King out of the ring for the first elimination. The final four participants were Matt Cardona, KiLynn King, Bully Ray and Jordynne Grace. Bully Ray then clotheslined King out of the ring and Grace threw Cardona out of the ring simultaneously. As Bully Ray wanted to attempt a diving senton, Grace moved out of the way and delivered the Grace Driver to Bully Ray and pinned him to win the trophy. After the match, Grace declared that she will challenge for the Impact Knockouts World Championship at Hard to Kill.

In the penultimate match, Trinity defended the Impact Knockouts World Championship against Mickie James. In the opening stages, Trinity attempted the Starstruck submission, but James escaped and delivered a headscissors takedown. Trinity then delivered her own headscissors takedown and split-legged moonsault for a two-count. Trinity then delivered the Rear View for a two-count. Trinity then delivered an enzeguiri and another split-legged moonsault for a nearfall. James then delivered the Mick Kick and a tornado DDT for a two-count. As James wanted to attempt the Mick-DT, Trinity countered it into a Full Nelson Bomb. Trinity then locked in Starstruck, but James countered it into a pin for a two-count, but Trinity then recovered and locked in Starstruck again, forcing James to tap out.

=== Main event ===
In the main event, Alex Shelley defended the Impact World Championship against Josh Alexander. In the opening stages, Shelley attempted a big boot, but Alexander blocked it and delivered multiple knife-edge chops. Shelley then delivered a rolling elbow and a twisting neckbreaker. Alexander then delivered a German Suplex to Shelley for a two-count. Shelley then delivered a snap German suplex and Sliced Bread for a two-count. Alexander then delivered a bridging German Suplex for a two-count. As Alexander wanted to attempt a diving crossbody to Shelley on the outside, Shelley caught him and delivered Shell Shock to Alexander onto the barricade. Shelley then delivered a frog splash and locked in the Border City Stretch, but Alexander reversed it into an ankle lock, but Shelley escaped. Shelley then delivered Shell Shock and a superkick. Shelley then delivered another Shell Shock to Alexander and pinned him to retain the title. After the match, Shelley and Alexander embraced each other.

A vignette then aired revealing the return of TNA at Hard to Kill in 2024. Afterwards, Impact Wrestling president Scott D'Amore then announced that 'TNA Wrestling is back!'.

== Reception ==
The event received acclaim for its matches and quality, the Ospreay vs. Bailey match, in particular, with many calling it one of the best matches of the year.

== Results ==
No.	Results	Stipulations	Times
1^{MEM}	MK Ultra (Masha Slamovich and Killer Kelly) (c) defeated Deonna Purrazzo and Tasha Steelz	Tag team match for the Impact Knockouts World Tag Team Championship (Note: The match was taped for an Impact Main Event Mondays that aired on October 23.)	6:06
2	Chris Sabin (c) defeated Kenta by pinfall	Singles match for the Impact X Division Championship	11:28
3	PCO defeated Moose, Rhino, and Steve Maclin by pinfall	Monster's Ball match	11:09
4	ABC (Chris Bey and Ace Austin) defeated The Rascalz (Zachary Wentz and Trey Miguel) (c) by pinfall	Tag team match for the Impact World Tag Team Championship (This was Bey's Feast or Fired Tag Team Title match)	9:49
5	Will Ospreay defeated Mike Bailey by pinfall	Singles match	17:58
6	Jordynne Grace won by last eliminating Bully Ray	20-person Intergender Call Your Shot Gauntlet; The winner receives a trophy and a contract they can invoke anytime within one year for a championship match of their choosing.	28:56
7	Trinity (c) defeated Mickie James by submission	Singles match for the Impact Knockouts World Championship	11:59
8	Alex Shelley (c) defeated Josh Alexander by pinfall	Singles match for the Impact World Championship	22:32
(c) / – the champion(s) heading into the match; MEM / – the match was taped for a future broadcast of Main Event Mondays

=== Call Your Shot Gauntlet entrances and eliminations ===
Draw	Entrant	Eliminated by	Order	Elimination(s)
1	Jake Something	Matt Cardona and Brian Myers	15	2
2	Eddie Edwards	Eric Young	5	1
3	Kenny King	Juventud Guerrera	1	0
4	Juventud Guerrera	Eddie Edwards	3	1
5	Johnny Swinger	Gisele Shaw	2	0
6	Gisele Shaw	Sonny Kiss	4	1
7	Jody Threat	Jonathan Gresham	9	0
8	KiLynn King	Bully Ray	17	0
9	Sonny Kiss	Matt Cardona and Brian Myers	7	1
10	Bully Ray	Jordynne Grace	19	1
11	Matt Cardona	Jordynne Grace	18	5
12	Jordynne Grace	Winner	—	2
13	Eric Young	Matt Cardona	13	1
14	Joe Hendry	Brian Myers	6	0
15	Brian Myers	Matt Cardona	16	6
16	Heath	Brian Myers	8	0
17	Frankie Kazarian	Matt Cardona and Brian Myers	11	0
18	Rich Swann	Brian Myers	12	0
19	Jonathan Gresham	Jake Something	14	1
20	Dirty Dango	Jake Something	10	0
