= WrestleCon =

Professional wrestling fan convention

- Status: Active
- Frequency: Annual
- Location: Various
- Country: United States
- Founded: 2012
- Organizer: Highspots
- Website: https://www.wrestlecon.com/

WrestleCon is an annual professional wrestling fan convention held each spring since 2013 by Highspots, a digital professional wrestling retailer. The event features guest appearances, question-and-answer sessions, and live matches.

Traditionally, WrestleCon takes place during the weekend of, and either in or near the host city of WrestleMania - the flagship event of WWE and considered the biggest wrestling event of the year.

== History and organization ==
The inaugural WrestleCon was a collaboration between Highspots and WWNLive.com, taking place April 5–7, 2013 at the Meadowlands Expo Center in Secaucus, New Jersey during WrestleMania 29 weekend. The convention included appearances by Bruno Sammartino, Paul Orndorff, Demolition, Tito Santana, The Iron Sheik and more. It also featured live wrestling from five promotions – EVOLVE, Combat Zone Wrestling, SHIMMER, CHIKARA, and Dragon Gate USA.

In 2014, WrestleCon emanated from The Sugar Mill in New Orleans, Louisiana, and featured appearances by Bill Goldberg, Roddy Piper, Edge, and Bret Hart and Jim Neidhart together as the Hart Foundation. WWNLive and its affiliated promotions did not participate in WrestleCon in 2014, with the live wrestling portion of the convention being the inaugural WrestleCon Supershow headlined by Kevin Steen, Jeff Jarrett, Colt Cabana, Chris Hero, Drew Gulak, Masato Tanaka, The Suck Me Crew and more.

Beginning in 2018, the annual WrestleCon Supershow was rechristened the Mark Hitchcock Memorial SuperShow in honor of Mark Hitchcock, an artist and wrestling fan who assisted in DVD production for Highspots

Originally scheduled for April 2–5, the 2020 event was cancelled due to the COVID-19 pandemic.

Due to the lingering pandemic, WrestleCon was not held in 2021. It returned in 2022 during WrestleMania 38 weekend.

In 2022, Impact Wrestling, since reverted to its past branding as Total Nonstop Action Wrestling, began promoting events as part of WrestleCon, partnering with different promotions to produce "Multiverse" shows.

== Other events held as part of WrestleCon ==
=== 2013 ===
Event	Promotion	Date	City	Venue	Main event	Notes
EVOLVE 19: Crowning The Champion	Evolve Wrestling	April 5	Secaucus, New Jersey	Meadowlands Expo Center	AR Fox vs. Sami Callihan in an EVOLVE Championship tournament final match	Streamed live on WWNLive.com
CZW at Wrestlecon	Combat Zone Wrestling	April 5	Secaucus, New Jersey	Meadowlands Expo Center	MASADA (c) vs. Jun Kasai in a World Glass, Barbed Wire & Gusset Plate deathmatch for the CZW World Heavyweight Championship	streamed live on RFVideoNow.com
Late Fight With Kaiju Big Battel	Kaiju Big Battel	April 5	Secaucus, New Jersey	Meadowlands Expo Center	American Beetle (c) vs. Dr. Cube for the Kaiju Grand Championship	Streamed live on WWNLive.com
SHIMMER Volume 53	Shimmer Women Athletes	April 6	Secaucus, New Jersey	Meadowlands Expo Center	Saraya Knight (c) vs. Cheerleader Melissa in a steel cage match for the SHIMMER Championship	Streamed live on WWNLive.com
Shoulder of Pallas	Chikara	April 6	Secaucus, New Jersey	Meadowlands Expo Center	Jushin Thunder Liger and Mike Quackenbush vs. Jigsaw and The Shard	Later released on DVD
Open The Ultimate Gate	Dragon Gate USA	April 6	Secaucus, New Jersey	Meadowlands Expo Center	Johnny Gargano (c) vs. SHINGO for the Open the Freedom Gate Championship	Streamed live on WWNLive.com
Mercury Rising	Dragon Gate USA	April 7	Secaucus, New Jersey	Meadowlands Expo Center	SHINGO vs. Akira Tozawa	Streamed live on WWNLive.com
(c) – refers to the champion(s) heading into the match

=== 2014 ===
Event	Promotion	Date	City	Venue	Main event	Notes
5DW Live V	5 Dollar Wrestling	April 5	New Orleans, Louisiana	Sugar Mill	Freight Train vs. Steve Corino	
(c) – refers to the champion(s) heading into the match

=== 2016 ===
Event	Promotion	Date	City	Venue	Main event	Notes
QOC 10	Queens of Combat	April 1	Dallas, Texas	Hyatt Regency Dallas	Taeler Hendrix (c) vs. Jessicka Havok vs. Tessa Blanchard in a three way match for the QOC Championship	
(c) – refers to the champion(s) heading into the match

=== 2017 ===
Event	Promotion	Date	City	Venue	Main event	Notes
WrestlePro WrestleCon	WrestlePro	March 30	Orlando, Florida	Wyndham Orlando Resort	Cody Rhodes (c) vs. Brian Cage for the GFW NEX*GEN Championship	
RevPro WrestleCon	Revolution Pro Wrestling	March 31	Orlando, Florida	Wyndham Orlando Resort	Zack Sabre Jr. (c) vs. Penta El Zero M for the RevPro British Heavyweight Championship	
Pancakes & Piledrivers	The Wrestling Revolver	April 1	Orlando, Florida	Wyndham Orlando Resort	Jason Cade vs. AR Fox vs. Arik Cannon vs. Caleb Konley vs. Davey Vega vs. Joey Janela (w/Penelope Ford) vs. Lio Rush vs. Serpentico vs. Trevor Lee vs. Trey Miguel vs. Zachary Wentz in a AR Fox Invitational match for the vacant PWR Scramble Championship	Later released on DVD
Best of the Best 16	Combat Zone Wrestling	April 1	Orlando, Florida	Wyndham Orlando Resort	Dave Crist (w/JT Davidson) vs. Shane Strickland in a Best of the Best 16 finals match	Later released on DVD
(c) – refers to the champion(s) heading into the match

=== 2018 ===
Event	Promotion	Date	City	Venue	Main event	Notes
WildKat WrestleCon	WildKat Pro Wrestling	April 5	New Orleans, Louisiana	The Sugar Mill	J. Spade (c) vs. Billy Gunn vs. Bob Holly vs. Stevie Richards for the WildKat Heavyweight Championship	
The Crash WrestleCon	The Crash Lucha Libre	April 5	New Orleans, Louisiana	The Sugar Mill	Austin Aries vs. Penta el 0M	
RevPro WrestleCon	Revolution Pro Wrestling	April 6	New Orleans, Louisiana	The Sugar Mill	Zack Sabre Jr. (c) vs. Tomohiro Ishii for the RevPro Undisputed British Heavyweight Championship	
Impact Wrestling vs. Lucha Underground	Impact Wrestling; Lucha Underground	April 6	New Orleans, Louisiana	The Sugar Mill	Pentagón Dark vs. Austin Aries vs. Fénix in a three way match	Streamed live on Twitch
Pancakes & Piledrivers II: The Indy Summit	The Wrestling Revolver; AAW: Professional Wrestling Redefined; Fight Club: PRO	April 7	New Orleans, Louisiana	The Sugar Mill	Besties In The World (Davey Vega and Mat Fitchett) (c) vs. Aussie Open (Kyle Fletcher and Mark Davis) vs. The Rascalz (Dezmond Xavier and Zachary Wentz) in a three way ladder match for the AAW Tag Team Championship and PWR Tag Team Championship	
Welcome To The Combat Zone	Combat Zone Wrestling	April 7	New Orleans, Louisiana	The Sugar Mill	Will Ospreay vs. Dezmond Xavier	Streamed live on StreamCZW.com
House of Hardcore 40	House of Hardcore	April 7	New Orleans, Louisiana	The Sugar Mill	Willie Mack vs. Alex Reynolds vs. Sami Callihan in a HOH Twitch Television Championship tournament final match	Streamed live on Twitch
(c) – refers to the champion(s) heading into the match

=== 2019 ===
Event	Promotion	Date	City	Venue	Main event	Notes
RevPro Live in New York	Revolution Pro Wrestling	April 5	New York City, New York	Hilton New York Midtown	Aussie Open (Kyle Fletcher and Mark Davis) vs. Roppongi 3K (SHO and YOH)	Streamed live on FITE TV
Pancakes & Piledrivers 3	The Wrestling Revolver	April 6	New York City, New York	Hilton New York Midtown	The Unwanted (Eddie Kingston, Joe Gacy, and Shane Strickland) vs. oVe (Dave Crist, Jake Crist, and Sami Callihan)	Streamed live on Highspots.com
(c) – refers to the champion(s) heading into the match

=== 2022 ===
Event	Promotion	Date	City	Venue	Main event	Notes
AAA Invades WrestleCon	Lucha Libre AAA Worldwide	March 31	Dallas, Texas	Fairmont Hotel Dallas	Psycho Clown vs. Taurus	Streamed on FITE TV
Zicky Dice’s Trouble In Paradise 2	Independent	April 1	Dallas, Texas	Fairmont Hotel Dallas	Scotty 2 Hotty vs. Rich Swann	Streamed on Twitch
NJPW STRONG Lone Star Shootout	New Japan Pro-Wrestling	April 1	Dallas, Texas	Fairmont Hotel Dallas	Part 1: Tomohiro Ishii vs. Chris Dickinson; Night 2: (aired May 7 as an episode of NJPW Strong): Team Filthy (J. R. Kratos, Royce Isaacs and Tom Lawlor) vs. Fred Rosser, Alex Coughlin and The DKC in a six man tag team match	Streamed on FITE TV
Multiverse of Matches	Impact Wrestling	April 1	Dallas, Texas	Fairmont Hotel Dallas	The Good Brothers (Doc Gallows and Karl Anderson) vs. The Briscoe Brothers (Jay Briscoe and Mark Briscoe)	Streamed on FITE TV
WrestleCon USA vs. The World	WrestleCon	April 2	Dallas, Texas	Fairmont Hotel Dallas	Michael Oku (c) vs. Rich Swann for the RevPro Undisputed British Cruiserweight Championship	Streamed on FITE TV
(c) – refers to the champion(s) heading into the match

=== 2023 ===
Event	Promotion	Date	City	Venue	Main event	Notes
Multiverse United: Only the Strong Survive	Impact Wrestling; New Japan Pro-Wrestling	March 30	Los Angeles, California	Globe Theatre	Hiroshi Tanahashi vs. Mike Bailey	Streamed on FITE TV
TJPW Live in Los Angeles	Tokyo Joshi Pro Wrestling	March 31	Los Angeles, California	Globe Theatre	121000000 (Maki Itoh and Miyu Yamashita) (c) vs. Magical Sugar Rabbits (Mizuki and Yuka Sakazaki) for the Princess Tag Team Championship	Streamed on FITE TV
Nervous Breakdown	Prestige Wrestling	March 31	Los Angeles, California	Globe Theatre	Time Splitters (Alex Shelley and KUSHIDA) and Ultimo Dragon vs. Team Filthy (Jorel Nelson, Royce Isaacs, and Tom Lawlor) in a six man tag team match	Streamed on Highspots.com
(c) – refers to the champion(s) heading into the match

=== 2026 ===
Event	Promotion	Date	City	Venue	Main event	Notes
PoderMania~!	PODER~!	April 15	Las Vegas, Nevada	Horseshoe Las Vegas		Streamed on TrillerTV
The Gate of Sin City	Dragon Gate USA	April 15	Las Vegas, Nevada	Horseshoe Las Vegas		Streamed on TrillerTV
Midnight Xpress	Pro Wrestling Unplugged; Hybrid Wrestling	April 16	Las Vegas, Nevada	Horseshoe Las Vegas		Streamed on TrillerTV
Progress Chapter 193: Progress Las Vegas II	Progress Wrestling	April 16	Las Vegas, Nevada	Horseshoe Las Vegas		Streamed on TrillerTV
Death Vegas Invitacional	New Japan Pro Wrestling	April 16	Las Vegas, Nevada	Horseshoe Las Vegas		Streamed on TrillerTV
MDK Fight Club	Game Changer Wrestling	April 17	Las Vegas, Nevada	Horseshoe Las Vegas		Streamed on TrillerTV
Gringo Loco's Wrld on Lucha	Game Changer Wrestling	April 17	Las Vegas, Nevada	Horseshoe Las Vegas		Streamed on TrillerTV
Josh Barnett's Bloodsport XV	Game Changer Wrestling	April 17	Las Vegas, Nevada	Horseshoe Las Vegas		Streamed on TrillerTV
Joey Janela's Spring Break X	Game Changer Wrestling	April 17	Las Vegas, Nevada	Horseshoe Las Vegas		Streamed on TrillerTV
Strangle-Mania: Viva Las Violence	Juggalo Championship Wrestling	April 18	Las Vegas, Nevada	Horseshoe Las Vegas		Streamed on TrillerTV
Effy's Big Gay Brunch 11	Game Changer Wrestling	April 18	Las Vegas, Nevada	Horseshoe Las Vegas		Streamed on TrillerTV
(c) – refers to the champion(s) heading into the match

== Supershow events ==
Event	Date	City	Venue	Main event
WrestleCon Supershow (2014)	April 5, 2014	New Orleans, Louisiana	The Sugar Mill	Masada defeated D. J. Hyde
WrestleCon Supershow (2015)	March 28, 2015	San Jose, California	San Jose Airport Hotel	Rob Van Dam and Sabu defeated The Hardy Boyz (Matt Hardy and Jeff Hardy) in a No Disqualification tag team match
WrestleCon Supershow (2016)	April 2, 2016	Dallas, Texas	Hyatt Regency Downtown	Jeff Hardy won a Six-Person Monster's Ball Match, also including Abyss, Andrew Everett, A. R. Fox, Trevor Lee, and Pentagón Jr.
WrestleCon Supershow (2017)	March 31, 2017	Orlando, Florida	Wyndham Orlando Resort	The Hardy Boyz (Matt Hardy and Jeff Hardy) defeated The Lucha Bros (Pentagón Jr. and Rey Fénix)
Mark Hitchcock Memorial SuperShow (2018)	April 5, 2018	New Orleans, Louisiana	The Sugar Mill	Golden☆Lovers (Kenny Omega & Kota Ibushi) defeated Chuck Taylor & Flip Gordon
Mark Hitchcock Memorial SuperShow (2019)	April 4, 2019	New York City, New York	Hilton New York Midtown	Will Ospreay defeated Bandido
Mark Hitchcock Memorial SuperShow (2020)	April 2, 2020	Tampa, Florida	The Ritz	Cancelled due to the COVID-19 pandemic
Mark Hitchcock Memorial SuperShow (2022)	March 31, 2022	Dallas, Texas	Fairmont Dallas	The Briscoe Brothers (Jay Briscoe and Mark Briscoe) defeated The Rottweilers (Homicide and Low Ki)
Mark Hitchcock Memorial SuperShow (2023)	March 30, 2023	Los Angeles, California	Globe Theater	El Hijo del Vikingo (c) defeated Black Taurus and Komander to retain the AAA Mega Championship
Mark Hitchcock Memorial SuperShow (2024)	April 4, 2024	Philadelphia, Pennsylvania	2300 Arena	Paul Walter Hauser defeated Sami Callihan in a Philly Street Fight
Mark Hitchcock Memorial SuperShow (2025)	April 17, 2025	Paradise, Nevada	Pearl Theater at Palms Casino Resort	TMDK (Zack Sabre Jr., Shane Haste and Bad Dude Tito) vs. Michael Oku, Flip Gordon and Hechicero
Mark Hitchcock Memorial SuperShow (2026)	April 16, 2026	Paradise, Nevada	Horseshoe Las Vegas	The Demand (Ricochet, Bishop Kaun and Toa Liona) vs. Michael Oku and JetSpeed (Kevin Knight and "Speedball" Mike Bailey)

== See also ==
- List of professional wrestling conventions
