= Impact Wrestling Rebellion (2023) =

2023 Impact Wrestling event

Rebellion
- Promotional poster featuring Steve Maclin (left) and Kushida (right)
- Promotion: Impact Wrestling
- Date: April 16, 2023
- City: Toronto, Ontario, Canada
- Venue: Rebel Entertainment Complex

Pay-per-view chronology
← Previous; Multiverse United	Next → Slammiversary

Rebellion chronology
← Previous; 2022	Next → 2024

The 2023 Rebellion was a professional wrestling pay-per-view (PPV) event produced by Impact Wrestling. It took place on April 16, 2023, at the Rebel Entertainment Complex in Toronto, Ontario, Canada. It was the fifth event under the Rebellion chronology.

Ten matches were contested at the event, including two on the pre-show and one taped as a digital exclusive. In the main event, Deonna Purrazzo defeated Jordynne Grace to win the vacant Impact Knockouts World Championship. In other prominent matches, Steve Maclin defeated Kushida to win the vacant Impact World Championship, Trey Miguel defeated Jonathan Gresham and Mike Bailey to retain the Impact X Division Championship, and Team Dreamer (Tommy Dreamer, Bhupinder Gujjar, Frankie Kazarian, Killer Kelly, and Yuya Uemura) defeated Team Bully (Bully Ray, Brian Myers, Kenny King, Masha Slamovich, and Moose) in a 10-wrestler Hardcore War. The event also featured the return of Nick Aldis, announcing his departure from the National Wrestling Alliance (NWA) to sign a contract with Impact.

== Production ==
=== Background ===
Rebellion is a professional wrestling event produced by Impact Wrestling. It is annually held during the month of April, and the event was first held in 2019. At Hard To Kill, Impact Wrestling announced Rebellion would take place in on April 16, 2023, at the Rebel Entertainment Complex in Toronto, Ontario, Canada.

=== Storylines ===
The event featured professional wrestling matches that involved different wrestlers from pre-existing scripted feuds and storylines. Wrestlers portrayed heroes, villains, or less distinguishable characters in scripted events that built tension and culminate in a wrestling match or series of matches. Storylines were produced on Impact's weekly television program.

At No Surrender, Steve Maclin defeated Brian Myers, Heath, and PCO in a four-way match to become number one contender to the Impact World Championship. Later that night, Josh Alexander retained the title over Rich Swann. Impact would later announce that Maclin would challenge Alexander for the title at Rebellion. On March 24, it was announced that Alexander had relinquished the title due to suffering a triceps tear. Maclin would now face Kushida – who was announced to challenge Alexander for the title at Multiverse United – to crown a new champion at Rebellion.

At Sacrifice, Mickie James was originally scheduled to defend the Impact Knockouts World Championship against Jordynne Grace. Prior to Sacrifice, it was announced that James had suffered an injury and would not be able to compete. At the event, James and Impact Director of Authority Santino Marella would have a sit-down interview, with James explaining that she suffered a broken rib and Marella revealing that Grace would get her title match at Rebellion. Additionally, James would not be able to defend her title at Multiverse United against Deonna Purrazzo, Gisele Shaw, and Miyu Yamashita. As such, Masha Slamovich took James' place in the match, with the winner being added to the title match at Rebellion. From there, James would be able to defend the title if she is medically cleared; if not, the title would be held up as vacant and a new champion would be determined in the match. At Multiverse United, Purrazzo won the match to move on to Rebellion. On the April 13 episode of Impact!, James revealed she would not be cleared to wrestle at Rebellion, and was forced to relinquish the Knockouts World Championship. Thus, either Grace and Purrazzo would become the new champion at Rebellion.

At Sacrifice, Bully Ray faced off with former friend-turned-enemy Tommy Dreamer in a Busted Open match. At one point during the match, Dreamer was able to make Ray bleed, but the referee was knocked out beforehand, so he wasn't able to see it. Ray's allies The Good Hands (Jason Hotch and John Skyler) would soon emerge, attacking Dreamer – making him bleed – while also cleaning up Ray's wound. When the referee came to, he saw Dreamer's face covered in blood and declared Ray the winner. After the match, Ray and the Good Hands would continue to assault Dreamer, while putting down rescue attempts from Yuya Uemura and National Hockey League (NHL) legend Darren McCarty, who Ray antagonized in the front row. Impact President Scott D'Amore, who had been away from Impact after being put through a table by Ray, would return and lead a cavalcade of wrestlers – including Heath, Rhino, Jonathan Gresham, Mike Bailey, and Impact Digital Media Champion Joe Hendry – to take out the Good Hands and send Ray running. Needing to settle their feud once and for all, Impact announced that Dreamer and Ray would both lead teams of five in Hardcore War at Rebellion. Dreamer would constantly ask D'Amore to be a part of his team, but due to the latter's new responsibilities, he turned Dreamer down. On the April 6 episode of Impact!, Dreamer, Uemura, and McCarty defeated Ray and The Good Hands in a six-man tag team match. After the match, several more wrestlers, including Frankie Kazarian, Kenny King, Killer Kelly, and Masha Slamovich, would engage in a wild brawl. Later on the full teams were announced for Hardcore War. Team Bully would feature The Good Hands, King, and Slamovich; while Team Dreamer consists of Uemura, Kazarian, Kelly, and later Bhupinder Gujjar. On the April 13 episode, King defeated Kazarian to give Team Bully the person advantage in the match, thanks in part to interference by Brian Myers and Moose. Because of their assistance, Myers and Moose would replace The Good Hands on Team Bully.

At No Surrender, Bullet Club (Ace Austin, Chris Bey, and Kenta) defeated Time Machine (Alex Shelley, Chris Sabin, and Kushida) in a six-man tag team match, with Austin pinning Sabin – who at the time was Impact World Tag Team Champions with Shelley. On the subsequent episode of Impact!, Austin and Bey defeated The Motor City Machine Guns to win the titles. A month later, on the April 6 episode of Impact!, The Motor City Machine Guns challenged Austin and Bey to a rematch, this time an Ultimate X match, at Rebellion, which was made official.

On the March 16 episode of Impact!, The Coven (KiLynn King and Taylor Wilde) won the Impact Knockouts World Tag Team Championship by defeating The Death Dollz (Rosemary and Taya Valkyrie). The following week, Jessicka went around backstage looking for The Coven, until she stumbled upon a casket. Valkyrie, worried that The Coven's magic may reveal her past life as Havok, tried to calm her down, until a hand emerged from the casket and pulled Valkyrie into it. On April 6, Impact announced that The Death Dollz (represented by Jessicka and Rosemary) would have their rematch against The Coven for the tag team titles on the Countdown to Rebellion pre-show.

On the April 6 episode of Impact!, Jonathan Gresham and Mike Bailey wrestled to determine the number one contender to the Impact X Division Championship held by Trey Miguel, who was stationed at commentary. Miguel interrupted the match and attacked both men, trying to get out of defending his title. Instead, Santino Marella scheduled Miguel to defend against both Gresham and Bailey in a three-way elimination match at Rebellion.

As part of Callihan's seven-step initiation process into The Design (Deaner, Angels, and Kon), Deaner tasked Callihan with the seventh and final step: "eliminate all the authority in your life." Moments later, Santino Marella was found to be attacked backstage. With Callihan the likely culprit, Marella declared to Scott D'Amore that he, Dirty Dango, and Joe Hendry would face The Design at Rebellion.

Since last January's Hard To Kill, Impact was invaded by former Ring of Honor (ROH) stars Matt Taven, Mike Bennett, PCO, Vincent, and Maria Kanellis-Bennett, collectively known as Honor No More. The stable would find additional members in Kenny King and Eddie Edwards, who turned heel and was revealed as Honor No More's leader at No Surrender. The group would run roughshod as a cohesive unit until Slammiversary when Honor No More lost to the Impact Originals (Alex Shelley, Chris Sabin, Davey Richards, Frankie Kazarian, and Nick Aldis), where PCO took the pin. Since then, Edwards would question PCO's loyalty and fault him for Honor No More's failures, including losses at Against All Odds, Victory Road, and a failed bid for the Impact World Tag Team Championship with Vincent on Impact!. At Bound for Glory, Edwards failed to win the Impact World Championship from Josh Alexander before going silent for two weeks. On the October 20 episode of Impact!, Edwards tried to rally Honor No More together, but his condescending tone towards PCO caused the latter to snap and attack his now-former stablemates, officially disbanding Honor No More. Two weeks later, Edwards fought PCO in the Mojave Desert where he incapacitated PCO and buried him in the sand. PCO would return two months later at Hard To Kill, attacking Edwards after his match. On the March 9, 2023 episode Impact!, PCO and Edwards returned to the desert, where it seemed as though PCO would do Edwards what he done to him the past November, only to be run over by a car that would drive Edwards away. The driver was initially thought to be Kenny King, who helped Edwards ambush PCO the following week and even wrestled him at Sacrifice, but King made it clear on April 6 that it was not him behind the wheel. Later that night, PCO and Edwards would finally have a one-on-one match, which Edwards won due to assistance from his wife Alisha Edwards, who initially opposed her husband's new ideals but seemed to turn around when it was clear she had driven the car. On April 10, Impact announced that PCO and Edwards would have a rematch at Rebellion, being a Last Rites match.

== Event ==
Other on-screen personnel
Role:	Name:
Commentators	Tom Hannifan
Commentators	Matthew Rehwoldt
Commentators	Nick Aldis (World Championship match)
Ring announcer	David Penzer
Referees	Daniel Spencer
Referees	Allison Leigh
Referees	Frank Gastineau
Interviewer	Gia Miller

=== Digital Media Exclusive Match ===
Before the event went live on pay-per-view, Crazzy Steve defeated Sheldon Jean which was aired as an Impact Digital Exclusive on April 18.

=== Countdown to Rebellion ===
During the Rebellion pre-show, Champagne Singh and Shera defeated Heath and Rhino.

Also on the pre-show, The Coven (KiLynn King and Taylor Wilde) successfully defended their Impact Knockouts World Tag Team Championship against The Death Dollz (Jessicka and Rosemary).

=== Preliminary matches ===
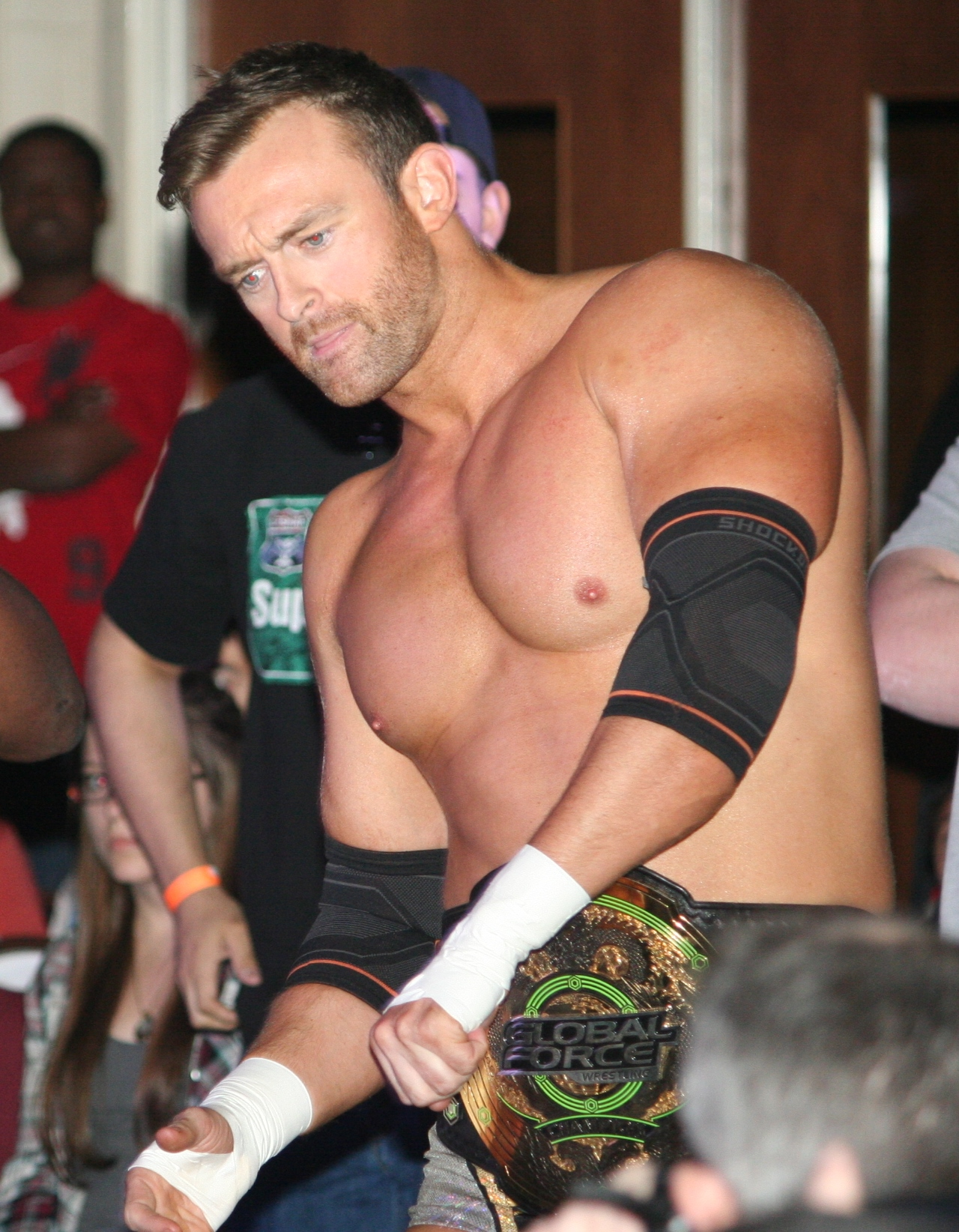
Rebellion saw the return of Nick Aldis to Impact Wrestling during the World Championship match

The actual pay-per-view opened with ABC (Ace Austin and Chris Bey) defending the Impact World Tag Team Championship against The Motor City Machine Guns (Alex Shelley and Chris Sabin) in an Ultimate X match. In the end, Austin boosted Bey up towards the cables. Sabin tried to stop him, but Bey unhooked both the titles to win the match and to retain the championship for his team.

Next, Dirty Dango, Joe Hendry, and Santino Marella faced The Design (Deaner, Angels, Callihan, and Kon) in a four-on-three handicap match. During the match, Deaner gave Callihan a baseball bat to attack Marella, only for Callihan to turn on Deaner by attacking him with the bat, turning face in the process. Callihan left the match, as Marella performed "The Cobra" on Deaner to win the match for his team.

After that, Eddie Edwards (accompanied by Alisha Edwards) faced PCO in a Last Rites match. During the match, Alisha tried to attack PCO with a shovel, which had no effect on him. Eddie went to superkick PCO, however, PCO shoved Alisha into Eddie's direction, thus Alisha accidentally got kicked by her husband. In the end, PCO used the shovel multiple times to attack Eddie, proceeded to chokeslam Eddie into the casket before slamming its lid shut to win the match.

Next, Trey Miguel defended the Impact X Division Championship against Jonathan Gresham and Mike Bailey in a three-way elimination match. During the match, while Gresham locked Bailey in a figure four leglock, Miguel leaped from the top rope on Gresham with a diving meteora into pinfall, eliminating Gresham from the match. In the end, Miguel rolled Bailey up into a pinfall by holding his tights into a three count to retain his title.

After that, Team Bully (Bully Ray, Brian Myers, Kenny King, Masha Slamovich, and Moose) faced Team Dreamer (Tommy Dreamer, Bhupinder Gujjar, Frankie Kazarian, Killer Kelly, and Yuya Uemura) in a 10-wrestler Hardcore War match. During the match, as Ray placed Dreamer on the table, Ray called the referees to hold the ladder while he climbs it to jump on Dreamer. As the referees refused to do so, Ray threatened one of the referees, which led all the referees attacking Ray. In the end, as Dreamer placed Ray on the table, all the referees held the ladder which Dreamer climbed to splash on Ray through the table for the pinfall, earning the victory for his team.

In the penultimate match, Kushida faced Steve Maclin for the vacant Impact World Championship. Before the match has begun, Nick Aldis was introduced as a guest commentator for the match. In the end, Maclin performed the KIA on Kushida to win the vacant title.

=== Main event ===
In the main event, Deonna Purrazzo faced Jordynne Grace for the vacant Impact Knockouts World Championship. In the end, Purrazzo performed the "Queen’s Gambit" on Grace to win the vacant title.

== Results ==
No.	Results	Stipulations	Times
1^{D}	Crazzy Steve defeated Sheldon Jean by pinfall (Note: The match was taped for an Impact Digital Exclusive that aired on April 18.)	Singles match	5:43
2^{P}	Champagne Singh and Shera defeated Heath and Rhino by pinfall	Tag team match	6:10
3^{P}	The Coven (KiLynn King and Taylor Wilde) (c) defeated The Death Dollz (Jessicka and Rosemary) by pinfall	Tag team match for the Impact Knockouts World Tag Team Championship	11:34
4	ABC (Ace Austin and Chris Bey) (c) defeated The Motor City Machine Guns (Alex Shelley and Chris Sabin)	Ultimate X match for the Impact World Tag Team Championship	13:05
5	Dirty Dango, Joe Hendry and Santino Marella defeated The Design (Angels, Callihan, Deaner and Kon) by pinfall	Four-on-three handicap match	10:50
6	PCO defeated Eddie Edwards (with Alisha Edwards)	Last Rites match	13:49
7	Trey Miguel (c) defeated Jonathan Gresham and Mike Bailey	Three-way elimination match for the Impact X Division Championship	13:55
8	Team Dreamer (Tommy Dreamer, Bhupinder Gujjar, Frankie Kazarian, Killer Kelly, and Yuya Uemura) defeated Team Bully (Bully Ray, Brian Myers, Kenny King, Masha Slamovich, and Moose) by pinfall	10-wrestler Hardcore War	25:15
9	Steve Maclin defeated Kushida by pinfall	Singles match for the vacant Impact World Championship	16:30
10	Deonna Purrazzo defeated Jordynne Grace by pinfall	Singles match for the vacant Impact Knockouts World Championship	17:10
(c) / – the champion(s) heading into the match; D / – this was a dark match; P / – the match was broadcast on the pre-show

=== Impact X Division Championship match ===
Eliminated	Wrestler	Eliminated by	Method of elimination	Time
1	Jonathan Gresham	Trey Miguel	Pinned after a meteora	9:37
2	Mike Bailey	Trey Miguel	Pinned with a roll-up	13:55
Winner	Trey Miguel (c)	—N/a		13:55
