= The Crash WrestleCon =

Mexican professional wrestling show

- Promotion: The Crash Lucha Libre
- Date: April 6, 2018
- City: New Orleans, Louisiana
- Venue: The Sugar Mill
- Tagline: Event poster

Event chronology
← Previous; The Crash VI Aniversario	Next → The Crash VII Aniversario

The Crash WrestleCon show was a professional wrestling supercard event, scripted and produced by the Mexican lucha libre wrestling company The Crash Lucha Libre, which took place on April 6, 2018. The show was held at The Sugar Mill in New Orleans, Louisiana, USA and was the first time The Crash had held a show in the United States. It was part of a larger "WrestleCon" event that took place in New Orleans around the WrestleMania 34 show held on April 8, 2018. The show was later made available on demand on the High Spots network.

The show featured several inter-promotional matches between The Crash wrestlers and wrestlers from Impact Wrestling (IW) who were also a part of the larger WrestleCon event. In the main event Austin Aries defeated The Crash representative Penta el 0M in a match where Aries' Impact World Championship was not on the line. The show also featured the one-night reunion of the Latino World Order (lWo) in the semi-main event as Damián 666, L.A. Park, and Nicho el Millonario teamed up to defeat La Rebelión Amarilla ("The Yellow Rebellion"; Bestia 666, Garza Jr., and Mecha Wolf 450). The fifth match of the night featured three wrestlers who primarily worked for Impact Wrestling and not The Crash as Willie Mack defeated Brian Cage and Sami Callihan. The show featured a total of eight matches.

== Production ==
=== Background ===
The first WrestleCon supershow was held in 2015 in San Jose, California on the same weekend as WrestleMania 31 in near-by Santa Clara, California. The first show led to an annual event held by various wrestling promotions in the week leading up to WrestleMania. In 2018 WrestleMania 34 was held in New Orleans, Louisiana, leading to various WrestleCon 2018 shows being held in and around New Orleans in the week leading up to the big show. As part of that show The Crash Lucha Libre announced that they would be promotion a show at WrestleCon. It was not just the first time The Crash participated in WrestleCon but also the first time they promoted a show outside of Mexico.

=== Storylines ===
The Crash WrestleCon show featured eight professional wrestling matches scripted by The Crash with some wrestlers involved in scripted feuds. The wrestlers portray either heels (referred to as rudos in Mexico, those that play the part of the "bad guys") or faces (técnicos in Mexico, the "good guy" characters) as they perform in the ring.

== Results ==
No.	Results	Stipulations	Times
1	La Rebelión Amarilla (Black Danger and Lacey Lane) defeated Angel Fashion/Christi Jaynes and Barbi Hayden/Joey Ryan and Douglas James/Thunder Rosa	Four-way tag team match	08:10
2	Daga defeated Bandido	Singles match	07:00
3	Laredo Kid defeated Flip Gordon and Rey Horus	Three-way match	06:40
4	The Rascalz (Dezmond Xavier and Zachary Wentz) defeated Aeroboy/Black Diamond, Curt Stallion/Jason Cade, and oVe (Dave and Jake Crist)	Four-way tag team match	05:12
5	Willie Mack defeated Brian Cage and Sami Callihan	Three-way match	09:46
6	Rey Fénix defeated Flamita	Singles match	05:26
7	the Latino World Order (Damián 666, L.A. Park, and Nicho el Millonario) defeated La Rebelión Amarilla (Bestia 666, Garza Jr., and Mecha Wolf 450)	Six-man tag team match	10:24
8	Austin Aries defeated Penta el 0M	Singles match	11:02

== Aftermath ==
The Crash did not participate in the 2019 WrestleCon event in the New Jersey/New York area. The main event match between Austin Aries and Penta el 0M led to Penta winning the Impact World Championship from Aries on April 22, 2018, at the Impact Wrestling Redemption show. While his reign only lasted for two days before Aries regained the championship, it did lead to Penta el 0M appearing regularly for Impact Wrestling over the following year.
