= Multiverse United =

Co-promoted professional wrestling pay-per-view event series

- Promotional poster
- Promotion(s): Impact Wrestling; New Japan Pro-Wrestling
- Brand: NJPW Strong
- Date: March 30, 2023
- City: Los Angeles, California
- Venue: Globe Theater
- Tagline: Only the Strong Survive

Pay-per-view chronology
← Previous; Impact: Hard To Kill; NJPW: All Star Junior Festival 2023; NJPW 51st Anniversary Show	Next → Impact: Rebellion; NJPW: Sakura Genesis

Multiverse chronology
← Previous; Multiverse of Matches	Next → Multiverse United 2

Multiverse United (marketed as Multiverse United: Only the Strong Survive) was a professional wrestling pay-per-view (PPV) event co-produced by Impact Wrestling and New Japan Pro-Wrestling (NJPW) as a part of WrestleCon. It took place on March 30, 2023, at the Globe Theater in Los Angeles, California. The event was the second Multiverse event promoted by Impact during WrestleMania Weekend as part of WrestleCon, following Multiverse of Matches in 2022, thus establishing the Multiverse event as an annual tradition.

Nine matches were contested at the event. In the main event, Hiroshi Tanahashi defeated Mike Bailey. In other prominent matches, Kenta defeated Minoru Suzuki to retain the Strong Openweight Championship, Trey Miguel retained the Impact X Division Championship in a Six-way Scramble, and Bullet Club (Ace Austin and Chris Bey) retained the Impact World Tag Team Championship in a four-way tag team match.

== Production ==
=== Background ===
In October 2019, NJPW announced their expansion into the United States with their new American division, New Japan Pro-Wrestling of America. On July 31, 2020, NJPW announced a new weekly series titled NJPW Strong. As part of NJPW's expansion into the United States, the series would be produced by NJoA. On January 30, 2023, NJPW announced that all of the promotion's future American events would be branded under the "Strong" name. Multiverse United would later air as part of the NJPW Strong on Demand series.

On February 9, 2023, Impact Wrestling and New Japan Pro-Wrestling (NJPW) announced they were co-producing an event as part of that year's WrestleCon called Multiverse United: Only the Strong Survive, taking place at the Globe Theater on Thursday, March 30, 2023, airing live on FITE.

=== Storylines ===
The event featured several professional wrestling matches, which involve different wrestlers from pre-existing scripted feuds, plots, and storylines. Wrestlers portrayed heroes, villains, or less distinguishable characters in scripted events that build tension and culminate in a wrestling match or series of matches. Storylines were produced on Impact's weekly television program.

== Event ==
=== Pre-show ===
There was only one match on the pre-show, with Yuya Uemura facing Gabriel Kidd. Uemura won after an overhead suplex and a diving crossbody.

=== Preliminary matches ===
In the opener, Trey Miguel defended the Impact X Division Championship against Clark Connors, Frankie Kazarian, Kevin Knight, Rich Swann, and Rocky Romero in a Six-way Scramble. In the end, as Knight jumped from the top rope, Connors countered with a spear in mid-air. Miguel then tossed Connors and pinned Knight to retain his title.

Next, Eddie Edwards, Joe Hendry, and Team Filthy (Tom Lawlor and J. R. Kratos) faced Alex Coughlin, Callihan, Fred Rosser, and PCO. The latter won after Callihan delivered a low blow and a Spike Piledriver to Hendry, and PCO performed the PCO-Sault on Kratos to win the match.

In the next bout, Jeff Cobb took on Moose. In the end, Cobb countered a move into the Tour of the Islands for the win.

Next, Deonna Purrazzo, Gisele Shaw, Masha Slamovich, and Miyu Yamashita squared off to determine who will head to Rebellion to challenge for the Impact Knockouts World Championship. In the end, Slamovich delivered an Air Raid Crash to Purrazzo. Yamashita then hit a Roundhouse Kick. Purrazzo then delivered a powerbomb and the Queen's Gambit on Shaw for the win.

In the next match, Bullet Club (Ace Austin and Chris Bey) defended the Impact World Tag Team Championship against Aussie Open (Kyle Fletcher and Mark Davis), The Motor City Machine Guns (Alex Shelley and Chris Sabin, and TMDK (Bad Dude Tito and Shane Haste). In the closing stages, Aussie Open delivered the Pendulum Powerbomb to Bey for a near fall. Bullet Club delivered Roundhouse Kicks to Tito, and then delivered the Art of Finesse/The Fold combination to retain the titles.

Next, Kushida faced Lio Rush. In the closing stages, Rush hit a suicide dive to Kushida on the outside. Kushida then locked in the Hoverboard Lock, but Rush escaped. Rush delivered the Come Up, but Kushida reached the bottom ropes. As Rush leaped into the air, Kushida countered it into the Hoverboard Lock for a tapout. After the match, both men embraced each other.

In the penultimate match, Kenta defended the Strong Openweight Championship against Minoru Suzuki. In the end, Kenta delivered a diving double-foot stomp for a two-count. As Kenta was looking for the GTH, Suzuki escaped into a sleeper, but Kenta escaped. Then, unbeknownst to the referee, Kenta delivered a low blow and rolled up Suzuki, with his feet on the ropes, for the win.

=== Main event ===
In the main event, Hiroshi Tanahashi faced Mike Bailey. On the outside, Bailey delivered a Springboard moonsault to Tanahashi. As Bailey was entering the ring, Tanahashi delivered a dragon screw on the ropes. As Bailey was looking for a tornado kick, Tanahashi countered into a Sling Blade. Bailey then delivered a top-rope hurricanrana and hit the tornado kick, but Tanahashi escaped the Ultima Weapon. Tanahashi then hit the High Fly Flow to pick up the victory. After the match, Tanahashi helped Bailey to his feet.

== Results ==
No.	Results	Stipulations	Times
1^{P}	Yuya Uemura defeated Gabriel Kidd by pinfall	Singles match	7:52
2	Trey Miguel (c) defeated Clark Connors, Frankie Kazarian, Kevin Knight, Rich Swann, and Rocky Romero by pinfall	Six-way Scramble for the Impact X Division Championship	7:11
3	Alex Coughlin, Callihan, Fred Rosser, and PCO defeated Eddie Edwards, Joe Hendry, and Team Filthy (Tom Lawlor and J. R. Kratos) by pinfall	Eight-man tag team match	12:24
4	Jeff Cobb defeated Moose by pinfall	Singles match	11:51
5	Deonna Purrazzo defeated Gisele Shaw, Masha Slamovich, and Miyu Yamashita by pinfall	Four-way match Winner was added to the Impact Knockouts World Championship match at Rebellion.	9:20
6	ABC (Ace Austin and Chris Bey) (c) defeated Aussie Open (Kyle Fletcher and Mark Davis), The Motor City Machine Guns (Alex Shelley and Chris Sabin), and TMDK (Bad Dude Tito and Shane Haste) by pinfall	Four-way tag team match for the Impact World Tag Team Championship	13:22
7	Kushida defeated Lio Rush by submission	Singles match	12:42
8	Kenta (c) defeated Minoru Suzuki by pinfall	Singles match for the Strong Openweight Championship	15:27
9	Hiroshi Tanahashi defeated Mike Bailey by pinfall	Singles match	15:16
(c) / – the champion(s) heading into the match; P / – the match was broadcast on the pre-show
