= Multiverse of Matches =

2022 Impact Wrestling event

- Promotional poster
- Promotion: Impact Wrestling
- Date: April 1, 2022
- City: Dallas, Texas
- Venue: Fairmont Dallas Hotel

Pay-per-view chronology
← Previous; Hard To Kill	Next → Rebellion

Multiverse chronology
← Previous; First	Next → Multiverse United

Multiverse of Matches was a professional wrestling pay-per-view (PPV) event produced by Impact Wrestling as a part of WrestleCon. It took place on April 1, 2022, at the Fairmont Dallas Hotel in Dallas, Texas, and was the debut of Impact's Multiverse series. The event featured talent from partner promotions, such as the National Wrestling Alliance (NWA) and New Japan Pro-Wrestling (NJPW).

Nine matches were contested at the event. In the main event, The Good Brothers (Doc Gallows and Karl Anderson) defeated The Briscoe Brothers (Jay Briscoe and Mark Briscoe). In other prominent matches, Trey Miguel retained the Impact X Division Championship in an Ultimate X match, The Influence (Madison Rayne and Tenille Dashwood) retained the Impact Knockouts World Tag Team Championship in a four-way tag team match, and Deonna Purrazzo defeated Faby Apache to retain the AAA Reina de Reinas Championship. The event also featured the returns of Nick Aldis (previously known as Magnus) and Taya Valkyrie.

== Production ==
Other on-screen personnel
Commentators	Tom Hannifan
Commentators	Matthew Rehwoldt
Ring announcers	David Penzer
Referees	Brian Hebner
Referees	Brandon Tolle
Referees	Daniel Spencer
Interviewer	Gia Miller

=== Background ===
On February 15, Impact Wrestling announced that they would hold two events at WrestleCon on April 1; Multiverse of Matches was one of these events, and would be featuring Impact talent in cross-promotional matches with other professional wrestling promotions. It was announced that Multiverse of Matches would take place on April 1, 2022, at the Fairmont Dallas Hotel in Dallas, Texas.

=== Storylines ===
The event featured professional wrestling matches that involved different wrestlers from pre-existing scripted feuds and storylines. Wrestlers portrayed villains, heroes, or less distinguishable characters in scripted events that built tension and culminated in a wrestling match or series of matches. Owing to the event's multiverse theme, storylines were not only produced on Impact's weekly television program but also through platforms used by the other represented promotions.

At NWA PowerrrTrip, a television taping for NWA Powerrr held on February 12, Impact Digital Media Champion Matt Cardona defeated Trevor Murdoch to win the NWA Worlds Heavyweight Championship. He would then be confronted by Nick Aldis (previously known as Magnus during his time with Impact Wrestling, which itself was called Total Nonstop Action Wrestling during that period), the man who Murdoch beat to become the champion, who announced he would enact his rematch clause to face Cardona for the title at the Crockett Cup event. At the event, on March 20, Cardona would win the match and retain the title when special guest referee Jeff Jarrett mistakenly believed he was given a low blow by Aldis' wife, Mickie James, when it was actually Cardona's wife, Chelsea Green. Though Green had been allied with James, and the latter had remained neutral in their husband's rivalry, Green would turn on James on the March 24 episode of Impact! (which was taped before the Crockett Cup on March 18) during the latter's Impact Knockouts World Championship match against Tasha Steelz, and would join Cardona in attacking her after the match. On March 25, it was announced that Aldis and James would team up to face Cardona and Green in an Intergender tag team match at Multiverse of Matches.

== Results ==
No.	Results	Stipulations	Times
1	Trey Miguel (c) defeated Blake Christian, Chris Bey, Jordynne Grace, Rich Swann, and Vincent	Intergender Ultimate X match for the Impact X Division Championship	7:27
2	Nick Aldis and Mickie James defeated Matt Cardona and Chelsea Green by submission	Mixed tag team match	7:04
3	Mike Bailey defeated Alex Shelley by pinfall	Singles match	15:03
4	The Influence (Madison Rayne and Tenille Dashwood) (c) defeated Decay (Havok and Rosemary), Gisele Shaw and Lady Frost, and Savannah Evans and Tasha Steelz by pinfall	Four-way tag team match for the Impact Knockouts World Tag Team Championship	9:02
5	Tomohiro Ishii defeated Eddie Edwards by pinfall	Singles match	14:59
6	Josh Alexander and Jonah defeated Moose and PCO by pinfall	Tag team match	12:47
7	Deonna Purrazzo (c) defeated Faby Apache by submission	Singles match for the AAA Reina de Reinas Championship	8:52
8	Chris Sabin defeated Jay White by pinfall	Singles match	16:00
9	The Good Brothers (Doc Gallows and Karl Anderson) defeated The Briscoe Brothers (Jay Briscoe and Mark Briscoe) by pinfall	Tag team match	9:46
(c) / – the champion(s) heading into the match
