= Multiverse (professional wrestling) =

- Promotions: Total Nonstop Action Wrestling; New Japan Pro-Wrestling
- First event: 2022

Multiverse is a professional wrestling event promoted by the U.S. based promotion Total Nonstop Action Wrestling as part of WrestleCon, which is held during the weekend of, and either in or nearby the same city as WrestleMania - the flagship event of WWE - which is considered to be the biggest wrestling event of the year.

== History ==
The "Multiverse" name stems from Impact either bringing in talent from, or co-producing the show with partner promotions such as New Japan Pro-Wrestling (NJPW), the National Wrestling Alliance (NWA), Ring of Honor (ROH), Game Changer Wrestling (GCW) and Mexico's Lucha Libre AAA Worldwide (AAA). The inaugural Multiverse event took place on April 1, 2022, at the Fairmount Hotel, in Dallas, Texas.

== Events ==
#	Event	Date	City	Venue	Main event	Ref.
1	Multiverse of Matches	April 1, 2022	Dallas, Texas	Fairmount Hotel	The Briscoe Brothers (Jay Briscoe and Mark Briscoe) vs. The Good Brothers (Doc Gallows and Karl Anderson)	
2	Multiverse United	March 30, 2023	Los Angeles, California	Globe Theater	Hiroshi Tanahashi vs. Mike Bailey	
3	Multiverse United 2	August 20, 2023	Philadelphia, Pennsylvania	2300 Arena	Alex Shelley (c) vs. Hiroshi Tanahashi for the Impact World Championship	

== See also ==
- Impact Wrestling vs. Lucha Underground
- United We Stand
- TNA: There's No Place Like Home
- ROH Supercard of Honor
