= Taylor Wilde =

Canadian professional wrestler (born 1986)

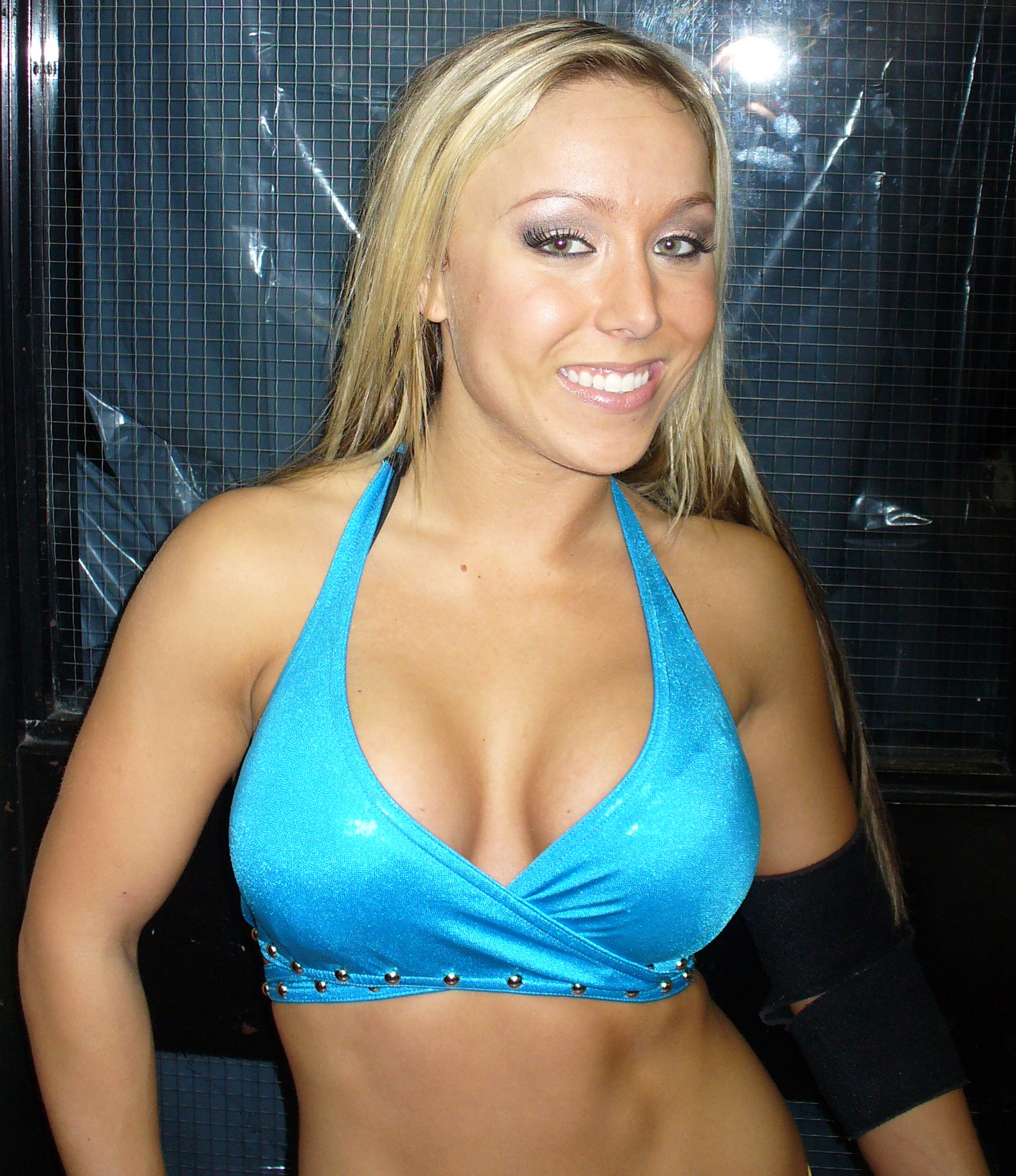
- Malawski at a BSE Pro event in 2009

Personal information
- Born: Shantelle Larissa Malawski; January 26, 1986 (age 40) Toronto, Ontario, Canada
- Children: 1

Professional wrestling career
- Ring name(s): Shantelle; Shantelle Stevens; Shantelle Taylor; San-Eye; Taylor; Taylor Wilde
- Billed height: 5 ft 3 in (160 cm)
- Billed weight: 130 lb (59 kg)
- Billed from: Toronto, Ontario, Canada
- Trained by: Rob Fuego; Bill Demott
- Debut: June 2003

Shantelle Larissa Malawski (born January 26, 1986) is a Canadian retired professional wrestler. She is best known for her time with TNA Wrestling, where she performed under the ring name Taylor Wilde.

Malawski was under a World Wrestling Entertainment (WWE) contract from 2006 to 2007, but never made it past the developmental system. In May 2008, Malawski joined TNA and would go on to become a one-time TNA Women's Knockout Champion and also went on to become the inaugural and three-time TNA Knockouts Tag Team Champion with her first reign being with her first tag team partner Sarita, her second reign being with her second tag team partner Hamada and her third reign being with her third tag team partner KiLynn King, while also becoming the first wrestler to have held both titles. After departing from TNA in December 2010, Malawski announced her retirement from professional wrestling and wrestled her final match on February 5, 2011, at an independent show. She returned to wrestling with Impact Wrestling in 2021, however, that same year she went on a hiatus while still being under contract with Impact. She returned to Impact in 2022. She once again left TNA (previously known as Impact Wrestling) suddenly in early 2024 and has stepped away from wrestling for the foreseeable future due to multiple personal life factors.

== Professional wrestling career ==
=== Early years (2003–2006) ===
Malawski made her professional debut in June 2003 at the age of 17 under the name Shantelle Taylor. In 2004, she was featured in the two-part wrestling documentary, Slam Bam, which aired on the Discovery Channel. In 2005, she won her first women's championship while competing in New Vision Pro Wrestling. She spent the summer of that year in Monterrey, Mexico working on her lucha libre style. In December she participated in a three-show tour of South Africa wrestling on a card that featured former World Wrestling Entertainment stars Kevin Nash, Andrew Martin and Scott Steiner. Also in December, she was invited to a tryout in Buffalo, New York for World Wrestling Entertainment. Malawski also worked for several independent wrestling promotions including Shimmer Women Athletes, Ring Divas' Battle Angels, Twin Wrestling Entertainment, and Blood Sweat and Ears. On April 16, 2006, Malawski defeated Traci Brooks to become the inaugural Battle Angels Women's Champion. Malawski also spent time working the Pure Women's Action shows for the Pure Wrestling Association in Southern Ontario.

=== World Wrestling Entertainment ===
==== Deep South Wrestling (2006–2007) ====
In May 2006, Malawski signed a deal with World Wrestling Entertainment and was assigned to their developmental territory Deep South Wrestling. She made her Deep South in-ring debut at the June 27, 2006, TV tapings as simply Shantelle, where she lost against Krissy Vaine. On September 9, 2006, Malawski defeated Vaine at Deep South Wrestling Grand Park Slam event in Six Flags Over Georgia. On the October 26, 2006, episode of DSW TV Tapings, Taylor defeated Angel Williams after a distraction from Tracy Taylor and again on the November 2 episode. In January 2007, Malawski appeared on the SmackDown!/ECW house shows as San-Eye, a masked Japanese wrestler, where she defeated Jamie Noble in an intergender match. In June 2007, Malawski wrestled in dark matches prior to the SmackDown! television tapings while wearing a mask including a bout where she defeated Jillian Hall. On the January 18 episode of DSW TV Tapings, Shantelle teamed up with Williams to defeat Taylor and Luscious.

On the January 19 episode of DSW TV Taping, Taylor continued her feud with Williams where she defeated Williams. On the January 25 episode of DSW TV Tapings, Taylor teamed up with Kofi Kingston to defeat Brian Cage and Williams. In March 2007, Taylor would gain an ally in Nattie Neidhart where they feud with Williams and Vaine in various tag team and singles matches. At the DSW Park Slam pay-per-view on March 17, 2007, Taylor teamed up with Neidhart in a winning effort, defeating Vaine and Williams. On the March 22 episode of DSW TV Tapings, Taylor teamed up with Eric Perez in a winning effort defeating Williams and Cru Jones in a mixed tag-team match. On the April 12 episode of DSW TV Tapings, Taylor teamed up with Neidhart to defeat Krissy Vaine and Angel Williams to end their feud.

==== Florida Championship Wrestling (2007) ====
When Florida Championship Wrestling opened in 2007, Taylor was transferred there. Taylor made her debut for FCW on the June 26 episode of FCW Television, losing to Neidhart in a triple treat match, also involving Krissy Vaine. On the June 30 episode of FCW Television, Taylor was defeated by Neidhart with Vaine as the special guest referee. On August 13, 2007, Malawski was released from her developmental contract. Following the release, she did not return to the independent circuit and was actually done with professional wrestling until TNA contacted her, as she had concentrated on pursuing a college degree instead.

=== Total Nonstop Action Wrestling ===
==== Knockouts Champion (2008) ====
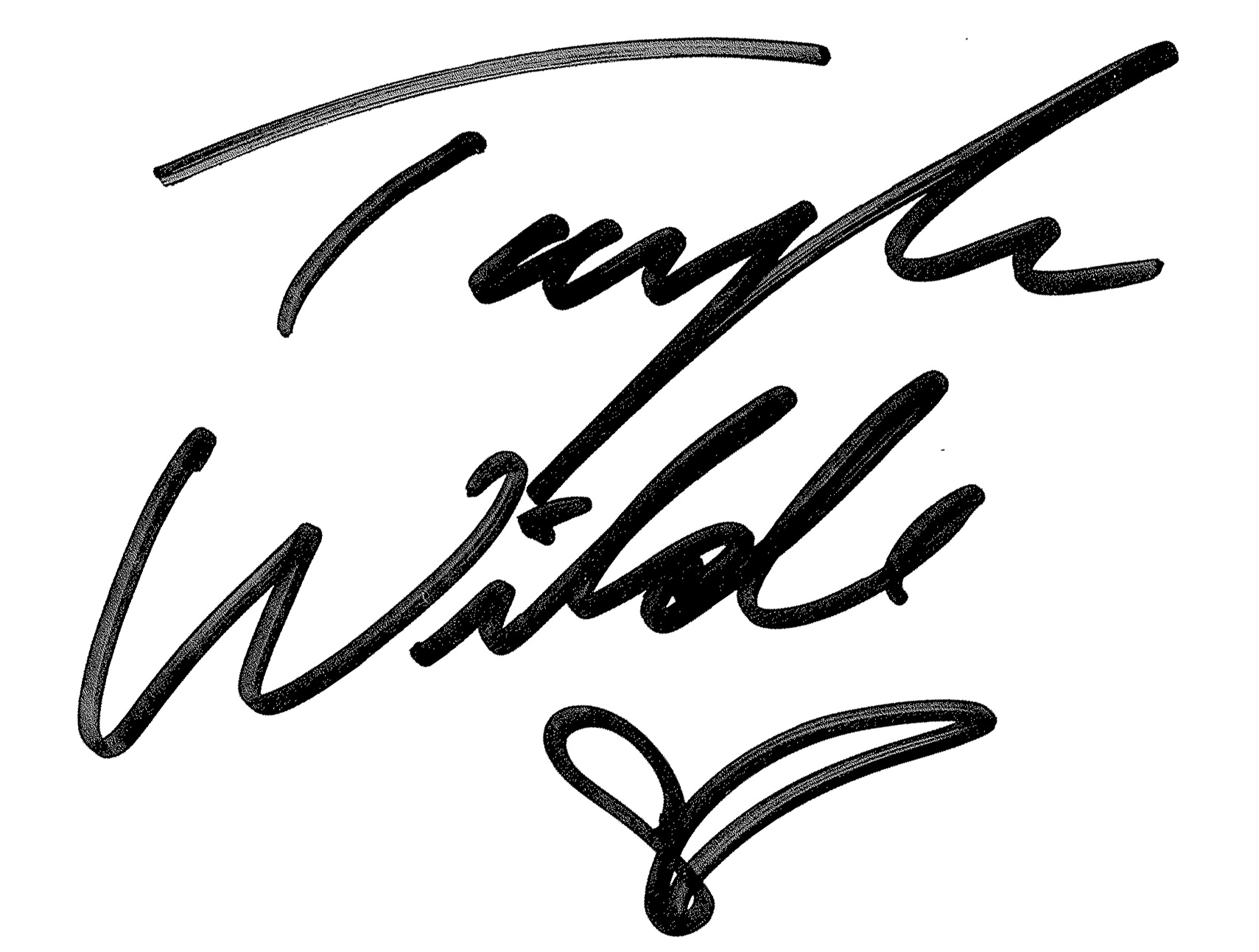
Wilde's autograph

Malawski's tryout match for Total Nonstop Action Wrestling (TNA) was against Raisha Saeed. In May 2008, Malawski signed a contract with TNA, making her an official member of the TNA roster. She then appeared on television as a "plant" on the May 29 episode of Impact!. She responded to the $25,000 challenge from Awesome Kong to any females age 18 or older in the audience, but was not selected to wrestle her. She reappeared in the audience on the June 5 episode of Impact! to challenge Kong, but once again was not selected to wrestle her. On June 19, she challenged Kong in the $25,000 challenge. She was announced under the name Taylor, and despite losing, she was the closest out of any of the contestants to defeating Kong. On the July 3 episode of Impact!, Taylor defeated Raisha Saeed and earned the right to face Kong again the following week in the $25,000 challenge, this time with the TNA Women's Knockout Championship also on the line. The following week, now using the name "Taylor Wilde", she defeated Kong in the $25,000 challenge and won the championship. Wilde then retained the title in a rematch at Victory Road against Kong.

On the July 24 episode of Impact!, Wilde defeated Velvet Sky in five seconds to retain the championship, and when immediately challenged to a rematch, defeated her in 20 seconds. Afterward, Wilde was attacked by the duo of Sky and Angelina Love (her formal rival Angel williams) (known as The Beautiful People) and was given the 'Brown Paper Bag Treatment', before ODB and Gail Kim could make the save. On the September 11 episode of Impact, Wilde beat Love in the first ever "Beautiful People Beauty Pageant", but was attacked by the Beautiful People, causing Rhino to make the save for a second time. At No Surrender she was accompanied by Rhino when she defeated Love. Wilde won a Triple Threat match at Bound for Glory against Awesome Kong and Roxxi to keep the title. On the October 23 episode of Impact!, Wilde lost the championship to Kong after interference from Saeed.

==== Various feuds (2008–2009) ====
At Turning Point, she teamed with Roxxi to defeat Raisha Saeed and Awesome Kong with a Bronco Buster. Continuing her feud with The Beautiful People, Wilde teamed with ODB and Roxxi to defeat them and Sharmell at Final Resolution. At Genesis she teamed once again with Roxxi and ODB to defeat Rhaka Khan, Raisha Saeed and Sojourner Bolt. The next week on Impact! Wilde, Roxxi and ODB defeated the Kongtourage once more.

Wilde and Roxxi began feuding with the Beautiful People when Wilde and Roxxi humiliated the Beautiful People by covering them with "muck." Soon after Wilde and Roxxi would continue to have series of tag team matches against The Beautiful People. On February 12, she competed in a 9 wrestler Gauntlet match which was won by Sojourner Bolt. At Destination X, she teamed with Roxxi and The Governor to defeat The Beautiful People and Madison Rayne in a six-woman tag team match. At Lockdown, she competed in a 3 way cage match for the TNA Knockouts Championship against Angelina Love and Awesome Kong, but the match was eventually won by Love. On April 23 she lost a number one contenders ladder match to Sojournor Bolt.

Wilde was interviewed on the May 7 edition of Impact, where she told interviewer Lauren that she had received notice of having a secret admirer. The following week, Lauren and Taylor were shown sitting at a table, waiting for the admirer to arrive. Soon, Daffney arrived, attacking and choking Taylor, blaming her for The Beautiful People cutting her hair off, and in the process, challenging her to the first ever Monster's Ball match at Sacrifice, which Wilde won. From the feud with Daffney, it was shown that Wilde is on-screen best friends with backstage interviewer, Lauren. Wilde and her tag team partner Abyss defeated Daffney and Raven in a Monster's Ball match at Slammiversary, thus ending her feud with Daffney.

==== Storyline with Sarita (2009–2010) ====
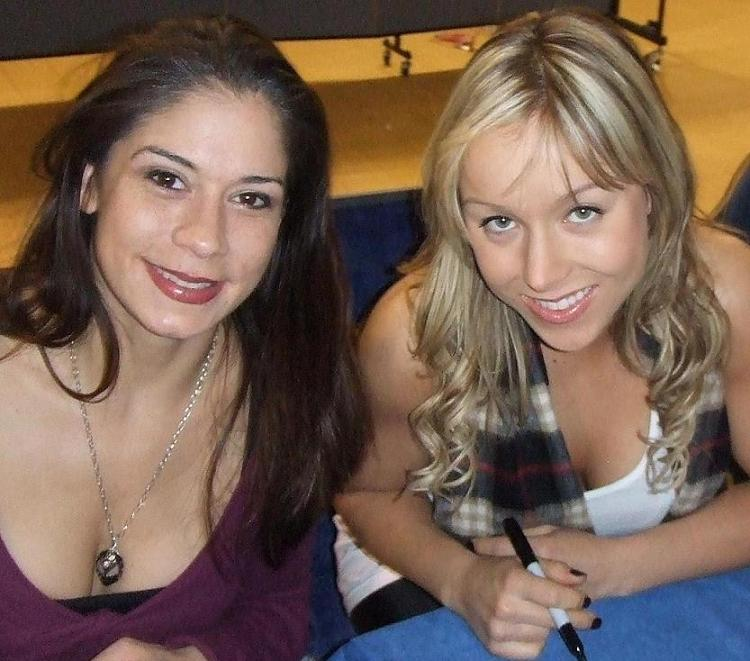
Malawski with Sarita at a TNA wrestling event in 2010

In August, Wilde formed an alliance with Sarita after TNA announced that they were going to crown new Knockouts Tag Team Champions. On the September 10 edition of Impact!, Wilde and Sarita advanced the semifinals of the Tag Team Championship tournament by defeating Alissa Flash and Daffney. The following week on Impact!, they advanced to the finals of the tournament by defeating Awesome Kong and Raisha Saeed. At No Surrender, Wilde and Sarita defeated Madison Rayne and Velvet Sky to become the inaugural Knockouts Tag Team Champions. This win makes Taylor Wilde the first wrestler in TNA history to win the singles and tag team titles. Wilde and Sarita successfully defended their titles against The Beautiful People at Bound for Glory and at Turning Point teamed with ODB to defeat The Beautiful People and retain both sets of titles. On the January 4, 2010, live, three-hour, Monday night edition of Impact!, Wilde and Sarita lost the Tag Team Championship to Hamada and Awesome Kong. Wilde and Sarita made their return in the March 8 edition of Impact!, unsuccessfully challenging for the vacant Tag Team titles. On the June 25 edition of Xplosion, Wilde defeated Daffney after interference from Sarita, ending the team's long losing streak. On the following week, Wilde confronted her tag team partner and explained that she didn't want to win by cheating, which led to Sarita displaying a villainous persona by claiming that she is a winner and, unlike Wilde, doesn't need her tag team partner's help in her match against Daffney. After Sarita was defeated by Daffney in a singles match, Wilde ran out to the ring and stopped her tag team partner from attacking her opponent. After being defeated by Women's Knockout Champion Madison Rayne on the July 1 edition of Impact!, Wilde's alliance with Sarita came to an end, when Sarita turned heel and attacked her, proclaiming she was sick of losing matches.

Wilde and Sarita faced each other on the following edition of Xplosion, with Sarita picking up the pinfall victory by holding her trunks. On the July 15 edition of Impact! Sarita defeated Wilde again, this time in a Street Fight.

==== Alliance with Hamada and departure (2010) ====
On July 27, at the tapings of the August 5 edition of Impact!, Wilde teamed with new tag team partner Hamada to defeat The Beautiful People (Velvet Sky and Lacey Von Erich) to win the TNA Knockouts Tag Team Championship for the second time. During September, Wilde and Hamada made two successful defenses of their championship, first defeating Lacey Von Erich and Madison Rayne on the September 16 episode of Impact Wrestling, and then Von Erich and Velvet Sky the following week, when Rayne turned on Von Erich. Wilde and Sarita had their third one–on–one match at the November 9 tapings of Xplosion, with Sarita once again coming out victorious. On December 6 at the tapings of the December 9 edition of Impact!, Wilde and Hamada were stripped of the Tag Team Championship, after Hamada had been released from TNA. Three days later it was reported that Malawski's contract with TNA had also expired. Malawski confirmed her departure from the promotion on December 29, 2010.

=== Retirement (2011–2020) ===
On January 10, 2011, Malawski announced that she was retiring from professional wrestling in order to concentrate on her psychology studies. She wrestled her retirement match on February 5, 2011, at a ChickFight and Pro Wrestling Revolution co–promoted event, where she was defeated by Alissa Flash.

=== Return to Impact Wrestling ===
==== Various challenges (2021–2022) ====
In early 2021, it was reported that Wilde was returning to TNA (now Impact Wrestling). On the April 8, 2021, episode of Impact!, a vignette aired promoting Wilde's return to the company. Wilde returned to Impact Wrestling on April 25 at the Rebellion pay-per-view. On May 15 at Under Siege, she teamed with Tenille Dashwood and defeated Kimber Lee and Susan. At Emergence, Wilde lost to a returning Madison Rayne. On September 18, at Victory Road, Wilde defeated Dashwood. In November 2021, it was reported that Malawski was going on temporary leave for personal reasons and was subsequently removed from the roster page for the foreseeable future. On October 7, 2022, at Bound for Glory, Wilde made her return by participating in the Call Your Shot Gauntlet, being eliminated by the returning Matt Cardona. On November 18, at Over Drive, Wilde lost to Mickie James.

==== Witchcraft and The Coven (2022–2023) ====
Through December, Wilde's character transformed into a darker edge of witchcraft. On January 13, 2023, at Hard To Kill, Wilde competed in a four-way match to determine the number one contender to the Impact Knockouts World Championship, which was won by Masha Slamovich.

On the February 9, 2023, episode of Impact!, Wilde would team with Killer Kelly to challenge the Knockouts World Tag Team Champions The Death Dollz (Rosemary and Taya Valkyrie) in a non-title match. During the match, Wilde refused to tag in, leaving Kelly to be beaten down and pinned thereby turning heel. On the March 9 episode of Impact!, Wilde would align herself with KiLynn King, forming a team called The Coven. On the March 16 episode of Impact!, Wilde and King defeated the Death Dollz to win the Impact Knockouts Tag Team Championship. On April 16, at Rebellion, The Coven had their first successful title defense against Jessicka and Rosemary. On the April 27 episode of Impact!, during the main event, Wilde challenged Deonna Purrazzo for the Knockouts World Championship, but was unsuccessful. Post-match, Wilde alongside King attacked Purrazzo before she was saved by Jordynne Grace. On the May 11, 2023, episode of Impact!, The Coven successful title defense against Purrazzo and Grace. Post-match, The Coven attacked both Purrazzo and Grace but Trinity runs down to the ring and makes the save. On the June 8, 2023, episode of Impact!, The Coven successfully defended the Knockouts Tag Team Championships against Death Dollz (Courtney Rush and Jessicka). On July 15, at Slammiversary, The Coven lost their title to Killer Kelly and Masha Slamovich, ending their reign at 139 days. On August 27, at Emergence, The Coven were set to participate in a four-way tag team match for the Knockouts World Tag Team Championship, however, Wilde was attacked during the pre-show. Jody Threat would later replace Wilde in the match, where MK Ultra retained their titles. On The October 12 episode of Impact!, King admitted to be the one who attacked Wilde with a tire iron, as she felt that Wilde became a deadweight after losing their tag titles.

Wilde revealed in early 2024 that she has stepped away from wrestling due to multiple personal life stressors as well as a neurological health issue. Due to the stress she was enduring, she decided it's best to put "wrestling on the shelf for now."

== Personal life ==
Malawski took psychology courses at York University to complete a Bachelor of Arts Honours Degree while on the road full time with TNA. In 2011, she completed a certificate at Humber College in Pre-Service Firefighter Education and Training. She has been a full time Professional Firefighter in Toronto since January 5, 2015. Malawski had a son on April 20, 2018, named after her mother, Taylor.

She is divorced. She said in her podcast how when she returned to wrestling, she brought her son with her.

Her father suffered multiple health issues, she stated how he 'almost died a few times' in the hospital. Her father is currently living independently. She lost her brother in law due to a heart attack, almost a year to the day that her father suffered from a heart attack.

A neurological health issue she faced was the final push in her stepping away from wrestling in 2024.

== Championships and accomplishments ==
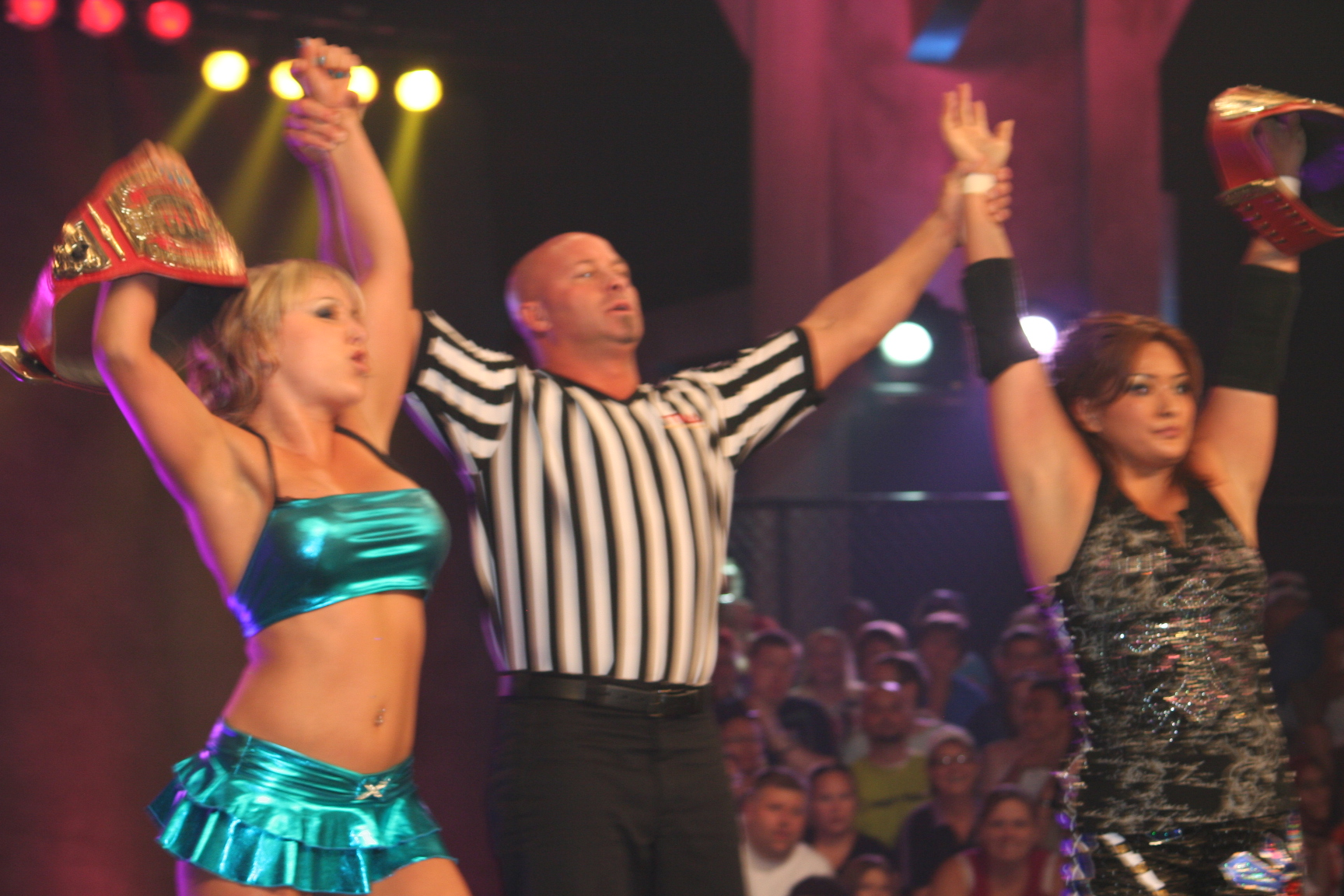
Wilde and Hamada with the TNA Knockouts Tag Team Championship

- New Vision Pro Wrestling
  - NVPW Women's Championship (1 time)
- Pro Wrestling Illustrated
  - Ranked No. 10 of the 50 top female wrestlers in the PWI Female 50 in 2009
- RingDivas Women's Wrestling
  - RingDivas FightGirl World Championship (1 time)
- Total Nonstop Action Wrestling / Impact Wrestling
  - TNA Women's Knockout Championship (1 time)
  - TNA/Impact Knockouts World Tag Team Championship (3 times, inaugural) – with Sarita (1), Hamada (1) and KiLynn King (1)
  - TNA Knockouts Tag Team Championship Tournament (2009) – with Sarita
- Women Superstars Uncensored
  - WSU Tag Team Championship (1 time) – with Amy Lee
