= Slammiversary (2023) =

2023 Impact Wrestling event

- Promotional poster featuring Alex Shelley, Nick Aldis, Deonna Purrazzo, and Trinity
- Promotion: Impact Wrestling
- Date: July 15, 2023
- City: Windsor, Ontario, Canada
- Venue: St. Clair College Sportsplex
- Buy rate: c. 4,400

Pay-per-view chronology
← Previous; Rebellion	Next → Multiverse United 2

Slammiversary chronology
← Previous; 2022	Next → 2024

The 2023 Slammiversary was a professional wrestling pay-per-view (PPV) event produced by Impact Wrestling. It took place on July 15, 2023, at the St. Clair College Sportsplex in Windsor, Ontario, Canada and celebrated the promotion's 21st anniversary. It was the 19th event under the Slammiversary chronology, and the final Slammiversary event to take place under the Impact Wrestling name.

Eleven matches were contested at the event, including two on the pre-show and one taped as a digital exclusive. In the main event, Alex Shelley defeated Nick Aldis to retain the Impact World Championship. In other prominent matches, Trinity defeated Deonna Purrazzo by submission to win the Impact Knockouts World Championship, Scott D'Amore and Eric Young defeated Bully Ray and Deaner, and Lio Rush defeated Chris Sabin to win the Impact X Division Championship. The event featured the returns of Jake Something, who competed in the Ultimate X match; Eric Young, who had signed with WWE prior to the event; Traci Brooks (who made an appearance as Frankie Kazarian's manager); and Josh Alexander, who had suffered a triceps tear.

== Production ==
Other on-screen personnel
Role:	Name:
Commentators	Tom Hannifan
Commentators	Matthew Rehwoldt
Ring announcer	David Penzer
Referees	Daniel Spencer
Referees	Allison Leigh
Referees	Frank Gastineau
Interviewer	Gia Miller

=== Background ===
Slammiversary is a professional wrestling pay-per-view event produced by Impact Wrestling to celebrate the anniversary of Impact's first event, which was held on June 19, 2002. As such, the event is usually held in the summer (June or July). The first event took place nearly a year after that event on June 18, 2003, and has since been considered one of Impact's premiere PPV events, along with Bound for Glory and – since 2020 – Hard To Kill, and Rebellion.

On March 24, 2023, at Sacrifice, it was announced by Impact Wrestling that Slammiversary would take place on July 15, 2023, at St. Clair College in Windsor, Ontario, Canada.

=== Storylines ===
The event featured several professional wrestling matches, which involved different wrestlers from pre-existing scripted feuds, plots, and storylines. Wrestlers portrayed heroes, villains, or less distinguishable characters in scripted events that built tension and culminated in a wrestling match or series of matches. Storylines were produced on Impact's weekly television program.

At Against All Odds, Nick Aldis won the first ever "8-4-1 Match" to become the number one contender to the Impact World Championship at Slammiversary. Later in the main event, Alex Shelley defeated Steve Maclin to become Impact World Champion for the first time, with Aldis now set as his challenger at Slammiversary.

On the May 4 episode of Impact!, Trinity (formerly Naomi in WWE) made her Impact debut, letting it be known that she has eyes on the Impact Knockouts World Championship. This declaration would soon draw out champion Deonna Purrazzo, with the two and Jordynne Grace sharing a tense stare-down in the ring. Nearly a month later on June 1, after Trinity won her match, she challenged Purrazzo to a title match at Slammiversary. Purrazzo accepted the challenge, and the match was soon made official.

At Under Siege, then-Impact World Champion Steve Maclin retained the title over PCO in a no disqualification match. After the match, per an agreement made the night before on Impact!, Impact President Scott D'Amore came out to strap the title belt around Maclin's waist, though Maclin refused to shake D'Amore's hand as was the agreement. However, as D'Amore watched Maclin walk away, Bully Ray came from behind and strangled D'Amore with a cable. Matthew Rehwoldt, PCO, and The Motor City Machine Guns (Alex Shelley and Chris Sabin) attempted to intervene but were all shut down by Ray and Maclin. This all culminated in the two putting D'Amore through a flaming table. Two weeks later at Against All Odds, Ray competed in the "8-4-1 Match," when D'Amore struck Ray with a steel chair to incapacitate him. The week later on Impact!, Ray cut a promo that revealed he filed a complaint with the Anthem Sports & Entertainment Board of Directors about D'Amore's involvement in his business. D'Amore confronted Ray soon after, saying that the board advised that he take a leave of absence from his duties as president. D'Amore also said he agreed with the board, though only because it allowed him to attack Ray right then and there. Maclin would soon come out and assist Ray once again before PCO appeared and took out both men. A recovered D'Amore then announced that, before officially accepting his leave, he signed a tag team match for Slammiversary, in which Ray and Maclin would face PCO and himself. This would be D'Amore's first official match in 4 years. On June 29, Impact announced that former Detroit Red Wings enforcer Darren McCarty, who Bully Ray had prior history with, would act as the special guest enforcer. However, on the July 6 Impact!, Ray and Maclin ambushed D'Amore and PCO in the ring, cuffing D'Amore to the ring ropes before dragging PCO to the backstage area. They would proceed to pour car battery acid into PCO's mouth before dousing him in lighter fluid and setting him on fire. PCO's status for Slammiversary is currently unknown, but it has left D'Amore without a partner. On July 8, Impact announced on its website that Maclin is also unable to participate at Slammiversary due to suffering a serious injury during Impact's Down Under Tour in Wagga Wagga, Australia. Ray's new tag team partner was announced live on Busted Open Radio the following Monday to be Deaner. D'Amore, meanwhile, has yet to name his new partner.

On the June 29 Impact!, Lio Rush made his Impact Wrestling in-ring debut. Later in the night, while Impact World Champion Alex Shelley and Nick Aldis were having a brawl, Shelley's tag team partner, Impact X Division Champion Chris Sabin, attempted to intervene on behalf of Shelley, only to be jumped from behind by Rush. As such, Sabin would challenge Rush to an X Division Championship match at Slammiversary, which Impact made official the following day. In addition to the title match, Impact also announced an Ultimate X match for Slammiversary, with the winner earning a guaranteed X Division Championship match at the time and place of their choosing. The participants are: Mike Bailey, Jonathan Gresham, Kushida, Kevin Knight, and Alan Angels.

On the June 22 episode of Impact!, Killer Kelly defeated Taylor Wilde, one half of the Impact Knockouts World Tag Team Champions The Coven. After the match, Wilde and her partner KiLynn King attacked Kelly, but the latter would be saved by her old rival Masha Slamovich with a dog collar and chain. The following week, Slamovich defeated King in a singles match. Wilde heavily got involved in the match but was eventually taken out by Kelly with a chain clasped around her neck. After the match, Slamovich would clasp the other end of the chain around her neck and pull Kelly towards her, signaling a new partnership between the two. On July 4, Impact would announce on their website that The Coven would defend the Knockouts World Tag Team Championship against Kelly and Slamovich at Slammiversary.

On the June 22 Impact!, Joe Hendry defended the Impact Digital Media Championship against Yuya Uemura, with Kenny King unexpectedly providing special guest commentary. After the match, King grabbed Hendry's title belt from the referee, holding it for a good amount of time before tossing back at Hendry. On the following episode, after King won his match, Hendry displayed a music video that highlighted King's past as a male stripper. On July 6, Impact announced on its website that King will challenge Hendry for the Digital Media Championship on the Countdown to Slammiversary pre-show.

At Against All Odds, Frankie Kazarian defeated Eddie Edwards in a first-time ever singles match. On the subsequent episode of Impact!, Kazarian mocked Bully Ray and Steve Maclin for their failed attack against Scott D'Amore and PCO, with Edwards backing him up believing their relationship had been mended. This led to a tag team match for the following week, with Edwards and Kazarian losing to Ray and Maclin. In the closing moments of the match, Kazarian had Maclin in a chicken wing submission when Edwards hit a kick that was apparently meant for Maclin but hit Kazarian instead. Edwards and Kazarian later mutually agreed that they were better opponents than allies, facing each other again in a singles match on the July 6 Impact!. There, Edwards won after heavy interference by his wife Alisha Edwards. Backstage after the match, Kazarian challenged Edwards to one more match at Slammiversary, bringing his own wife, former Impact Knockout Traci Brooks, to counter Alisha at ringside.

== Reception ==
Dave Meltzer from the Wrestling Observer Newsletter reported that the event had over 4,400 pay-per-view buys through the television, an increase of nearly 250% from the previous Slammiversary event, which had less than 1,300 buys.

== Results ==
No.	Results	Stipulations	Times
1^{D}	Heath and Bhupinder Gujjar defeated The Good Hands (John Skyler and Jason Hotch) by pinfall (Note: The match was taped for an Impact Digital Exclusive that aired on July 18.)	Tag team match	5:04
2^{P}	Jody Threat and The Death Dollz (Courtney Rush and Jessicka) defeated The SHAWntourage (Gisele Shaw, Savannah Evans, and Jai Vidal) by pinfall	Six-person tag team match	5:34
3^{P}	Kenny King (with Sheldon Jean) defeated Joe Hendry (c) by pinfall	Singles match for the Impact Digital Media Championship	6:09
4	Kushida defeated Alan Angels, Jake Something, Jonathan Gresham, Kevin Knight and Mike Bailey	Ultimate X match to determine the #1 contender to the Impact X Division Championship	11:11
5	MK Ultra (Killer Kelly and Masha Slamovich) defeated The Coven (Taylor Wilde and KiLynn King) (c) by pinfall	Tag team match for the Impact Knockouts World Tag Team Championship	9:04
6	Team Canada (Scott D'Amore and Eric Young) defeated Bully Ray and Deaner by pinfall	Tag team match Darren McCarty was the special guest enforcer.	11:49
7	Lio Rush defeated Chris Sabin (c) by pinfall	Singles match for the Impact X Division Championship	1:20
8	Subculture (Mark Andrews and Flash Morgan Webster) (with Dani Luna) defeated ABC (Ace Austin and Chris Bey) (c), Brian Myers and Moose and Rich Swann and Sami Callihan by pinfall	Four-way tag team match for the Impact World Tag Team Championship	10:36
9	Eddie Edwards (with Alisha Edwards) defeated Frankie Kazarian (with Traci Brooks) by pinfall	Singles match	17:43
10	Trinity defeated Deonna Purrazzo (c) by submission	Singles match for the Impact Knockouts World Championship	14:25
11	Alex Shelley (c) defeated Nick Aldis by pinfall	Singles match for the Impact World Championship	16:31
(c) / – the champion(s) heading into the match; D / – this was a dark match; P / – the match was broadcast on the pre-show
