= Kevin Knight =

American professional wrestler (born 1997)

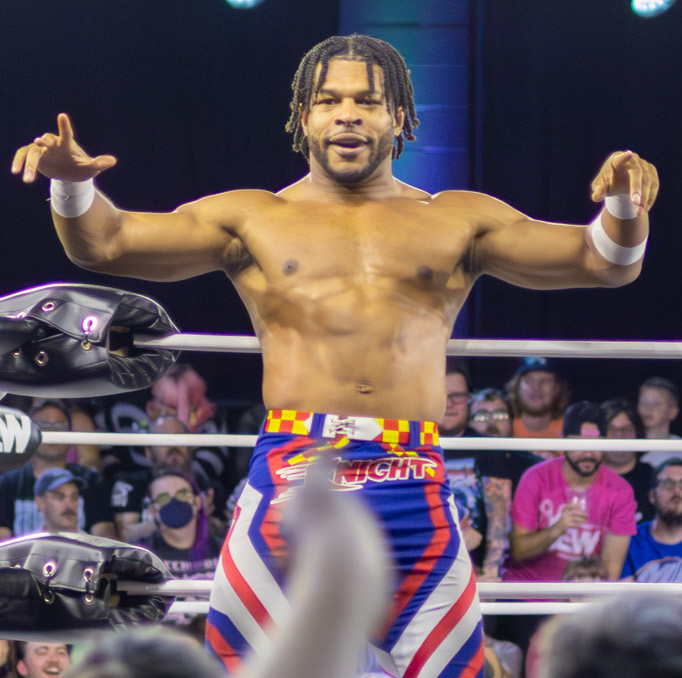
- Knight in 2025

Personal information
- Born: January 1, 1997 (age 29) Atlanta, Georgia, U.S.

Professional wrestling career
- Ring name(s): Jet Knight; Kevin Knight
- Billed height: 6 ft 0 in (183 cm)
- Billed weight: 211 lb (96 kg)
- Billed from: Atlanta, Georgia
- Trained by: Buddy Wayne; Katsuyori Shibata; NJPW L.A. Dojo
- Debut: May 2019

Kevin Knight (born January 1, 1997) is an American professional wrestler. As of March 2025, he is signed to American promotion All Elite Wrestling (AEW), where he is a member of the Don Callis Family. As of July 2020, he is also signed to Japanese promotion New Japan Pro-Wrestling (NJPW). He also makes appearances for partner promoton Consejo Mundial de Lucha Libre (CMLL).

He began his professional wrestling career in May 2019, mainly performing for Canadian and American promotions on the independent circuit under the ring name Jet Knight, including Pacific Pro Wrestling (PPW), Without A Cause (WAC) and DEFY Wrestling. He signed with NJPW in 2020 under his real name, and would go on to become a two-time IWGP Junior Heavyweight Tag Team Champion with Kushida as the Intergalactic Jet Setters. Through NJPW's working relationships, he also made appearances for Ring of Honor (ROH), Game Changer Wrestling (GCW) and Total Nonstop Action Wrestling (TNA). He signed with AEW in March 2025, forming JetSpeed with "Speedball" Mike Bailey, and would go on to win the AEW World Trios Championship twice and the AEW TNT Championship once.

== Professional wrestling career ==
=== Early career (2019–2020) ===
Knight made his professional wrestling debut in May 2019. For the majority of late 2019 and early 2020, he wrestled for a range of Canadian and American promotions on the independent circuit under the ring name Jet Knight, including Pacific Pro Wrestling (PPW), Without A Cause (WAC) and DEFY Wrestling.

=== New Japan Pro-Wrestling (2020–present) ===
==== Young Lion (2020–2022) ====
Knight began working for New Japan Pro-Wrestling (NJPW) under his real name in July 2020, training at their LA Dojo as a Young Lion. He made his NJPW in-ring debut on December 12 at Super J-Cup, replacing an injured Karl Fredericks, where he teamed with Ren Narita in a loss to Bullet Club's Hikuleo and Kenta. Starting on January 9, 2021, Knight wrestled on NJPW's American-based show Strong, commonly teaming with fellow LA Dojo members, such as Fredericks, Clark Connors and Alex Coughlin; he often lost most of his matches, a common practice for NJPW Young Lions. On August 14, Knight, Jordan Clearwater and The DKC lost to Stray Dog Army (Barrett Brown, Bateman and Misterioso) on the pre-show of the Resurgence pay-per-view.

At Lonestar Shootout on April 1, 2022, Knight, Daniel Garcia and FinJuice (David Finlay and Juice Robinson) lost to Connors, Fredericks, Máscara Dorada and Yuya Uemura in an eight-man tag-team match. On June 26, Knight wrestled at AEW x NJPW: Forbidden Door during the Buy-In, teaming with Coughlin, Uemura and The DKC in a loss to The Gunn Club (Billy, Austin and Colten Gunn) and Max Caster. At The Night Before Rumble on 44th Street on October 28, Knight and The DKC defeated Forever Hooligans (Rocky Romero and Alex Koslov), who had reunited for one-night only, in the opening match. The following night, at Rumble on 44th Street, they unsuccessfully challenged Aussie Open (Kyle Fletcher and Mark Davis) for the Strong Openweight Tag Team Championship in a three-way tag-team match also involving Motor City Machine Guns (Alex Shelley and Chris Sabin), who won the titles.

==== Intergalactic Jet Setters (2022–2025) ====
Knight made his debut in Japan for NJPW at Historic X-Over on November 20, after wrestling exclusively in the United States, teaming with Connors, Coughlin and Gabe Kidd on the pre-show to defeat Kosei Fujita, Oskar Leube, Ryohei Oiwa and Yuto Nakashima. It was also announced that Knight would compete in the 2022 Super Junior Tag League, teaming with regular LA Dojo trainer Kushida. The duo ended the tournament with four points after two wins and seven losses, failing to advance to the finals. During the tournament, Knight dropped the traditional black trunks worn by Young Lions, instead wearing bright orange gear to match with Kushida, signaling his graduation as a Young Lion. Following the tournament, Knight and Kushida continued to team together under the name "Jet Setters" (later tweaked to "Intergalactic Jet Setters").

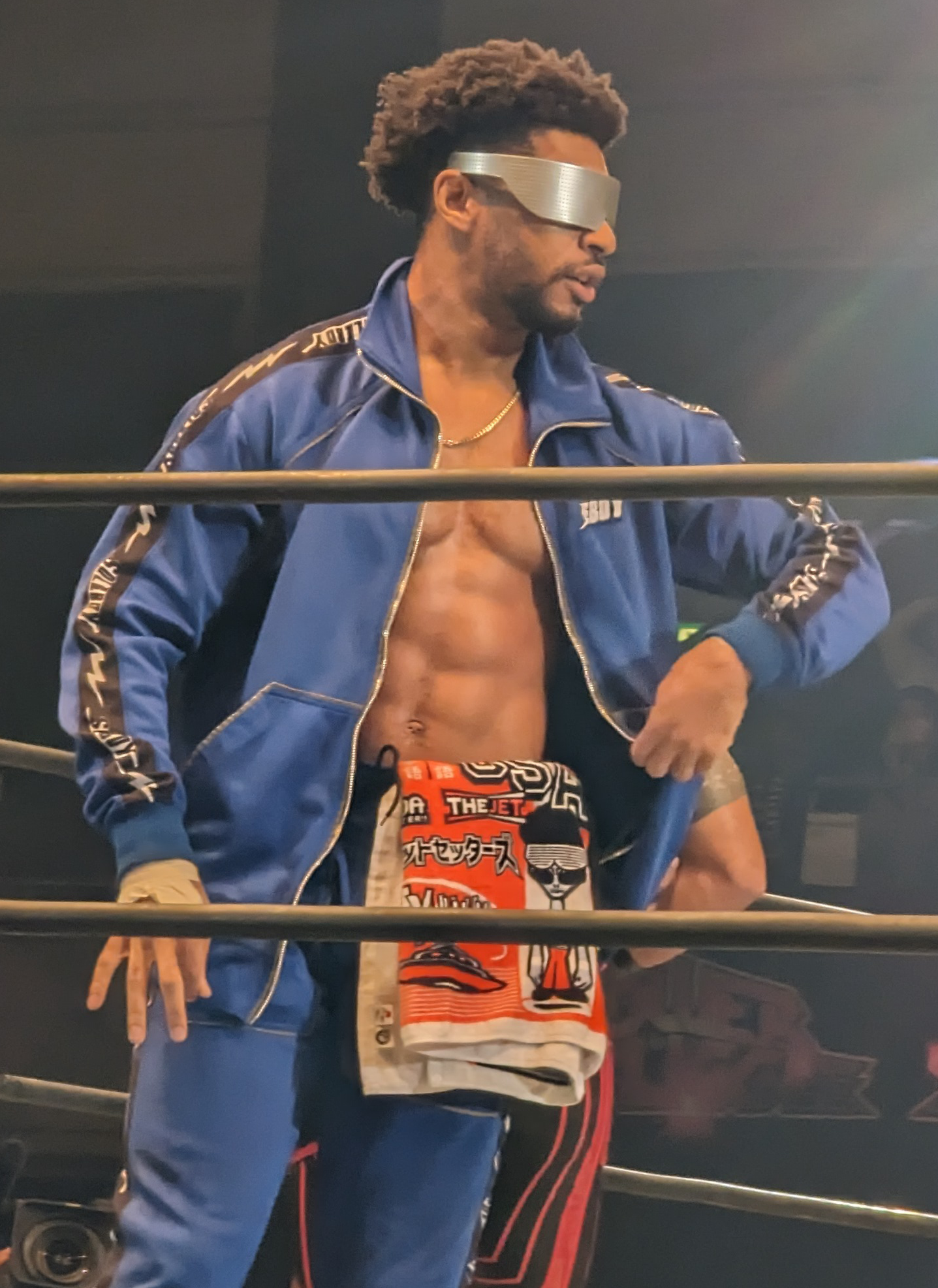
Knight in November 2023

On April 27, 2023, Jet Setters defeated Catch 2/2 (Francesco Akira and TJP) to win the IWGP Junior Heavyweight Tag Team Championship, marking Knight's first championship in NJPW. At Wrestling Dontaku 2023 on May 3, they and Shota Umino defeated Akira, TJP and Aaron Henare. That same day, it was announced that Knight would compete in his first Best of the Super Juniors tournament as part of the B Block. He finished with a record of six points after three wins and six losses, failing to advance to the semi-finals. On June 4, at Dominion 6.4 in Osaka-jo Hall, Jet Setters lost the IWGP Junior Heavyweight Tag Team Championship back to Catch 2/2. At All Star Junior Festival USA 2023 on August 19, Knight participated in the namesake tournament for an IWGP Junior Heavyweight Championship match against Hiromu Takahashi, defeating Connors in the semi-finals, before losing to Mike Bailey in the finals. Jet Setters failed to regain the IWGP Junior Heavyweight Tag Team Championship from new champions Bullet Club War Dogs (Connors and Drilla Moloney) at Destruction in Ryōgoku on October 9. They subsequently entered the 2023 Super Junior Tag League, where they finished with a record of ten points after five wins and four losses, failing to advance to the finals. At Power Struggle on November 4, they teamed with Tama Tonga to defeat Los Ingobernables de Japón (Bushi, Shingo Takagi and Titán).

At Sakura Genesis on April 6, 2024, Jet Setters again failed to regain the titles from Bullet Club War Dogs in a three-way tag team match also involving Catch 2/2. The following month, Knight competed in the 2024 Best of the Super Juniors as part of the A Block, but failed to advance to the semi-finals with a record of eight points after four wins and five losses. On October 14, at King of Pro-Wrestling, Jet Setters regained the titles from Bullet Club War Dogs. They made their first successful title defense at Maple Leaf Pro Wrestling (MLP)'s Forged in Excellence event on October 19 against Aiden Prince and El Reverso, Johnny Swinger and Brent Banks and Rogue Squadron (Rohit Raju and Sheldon Jean). Jet Setters then participated in the 2024 Super Junior Tag League, but failed to advance to the finals with a record of six points after three wins and two losses. They lost the titles at Wrestle Kingdom 19 on January 4, 2025, to Ichiban Sweet Boys (Fujita and Robbie Eagles) in a four-way tag team ladder match also involving Bullet Club War Dogs and Catch 2/2.

==== Sporadic appearances (2025–present) ====
On April 9, Knight revealed that he was still signed to NJPW, despite signing with AEW a month prior. Two days later, Jet Setters unsuccessfully challenged The World Class Wrecking Crew (Jorel Nelson and Royce Isaacs) for the Strong Openweight Tag Team Championship at Windy City Riot. In May, Knight competed in the 2025 Best of the Super Juniors, again as part of the B Block, but failed to advance to the finals with eight points after four wins and five losses.

=== All Elite Wrestling (2022–present) ===
==== Sporadic appearances (2022–2024) ====
Knight made his debut for All Elite Wrestling (AEW) on the May 10, 2022 episode of AEW Dark, teaming with The DKC in a loss to The Factory's Aaron Solo and Nick Comoroto. After the match, The Factory attempted to attack the duo, however, they were saved by their LA Dojo stablemates. This led to a match the following week, where Knight teamed with Clark Connors, Karl Fredericks, Alex Coughlin and Yuya Uemura to defeat The Factory's Q. T. Marshall, Solo, Comoroto, Blake Li and Brick Aldridge. On the January 18, 2023 episode of Dynamite, Knight and The DKC returned to AEW, accompanying Kushida to the ring during his TNT Championship match against Darby Allin. In November 2024, Knight made his debut for AEW's sister promotion Ring of Honor (ROH) at a Ring of Honor Wrestling taping, defeating Serpentico.

==== JetSpeed (2025–2026) ====
On the March 29, 2025 episode of Collision, Knight made his singles debut in AEW, losing to Jay White. After the match, AEW President Tony Khan announced that Knight had signed with the promotion. On the April 2 episode of Dynamite, it was announced that Knight would replace the injured White in the men's bracket of the Owen Hart Cup, a tournament where the winner would receive an AEW World Championship match at All In. At Dynasty four days later, Knight was eliminated in the first round of the tournament by Will Ospreay.

Knight formed a tag team with "Speedball" Mike Bailey, known as "JetSpeed", at Fyter Fest on June 4, teaming with Komander to defeat La Facción Ingobernable (Dralístico, Rush and The Beast Mortos). They challenged for the AEW World Tag Team Championship at All In on July 12 and All Out on September 20, but lost on both occasions. On November 24, Knight was announced as a participant in the 2025 Continental Classic, where he was placed in the Gold League. He finished the tournament with seven points after his last match with Pac ended in a time limit draw, failing to advance to the semi-finals. On the January 14, 2026 taping of Collision: Maximum Carnage, JetSpeed and Adam Page defeated The Opps (Samoa Joe, Powerhouse Hobbs and Katsuyori Shibata) for the AEW World Trios Championship, marking Knight's first championship in AEW. AEW officially began recognizing this reign when the episode aired on tape delay on January 17, and trio was officially named "Jet Set Rodeo". On the March 4 episode of Dynamite, Knight unsuccessfully challenged MJF for the AEW World Championship. That same episode, Jet Set Rodeo lost the AEW World Trios Championship to Don Callis Family (Kazuchika Okada, Kyle Fletcher and Mark Davis) after interference from MJF, ending their reign at 49 days (46 days as recognized by AEW). JetSpeed, this time with Místico, regained the Trios Championship from Don Callis Family at Revolution on March 15. On the April 8 tapings of Collision (aired on April 11), JetSpeed and Místico lost their titles to The Dogs (David Finlay, Clark Connors and Gabe Kidd), ending their reign at 25 days (27 days as recognized by AEW).

At Dynasty on April 12, Knight won the vacant AEW TNT Championship by pinning Daniel Garcia in a 10-man Casino Gauntlet match, marking Knight's first singles championship in his career in any promotion. As TNT Champion, Knight successfully defended his title against the likes of Claudio Castagnoli, MJF, Hook, and Brian Cage. Following his defense against MJF, reigning AEW World Champion Darby Allin granted Knight another opportunity at the title on the April 29 episode of Dynamite, where Knight was defeated.

==== Don Callis Family (2026–present) ====
Knight defeats Amazing Red in House of Glory using his "UFO Splash" finishing maneuver

On May 24 at Double or Nothing, Knight turned heel for the first time in his career by attacking Allin after he was defeated by MJF. Over the following weeks, Knight further cemented his heel turn after attacking his tag team partner Mike Bailey to disband JetSpeed and joined the Don Callis Family. On the July 18 episode of Collision, Knight would successfully defend his TNT Championship against AR Fox, marking Knight's record breaking ninth successful title defense and the most successful defenses in the title's history. Knight would also continue his pursuit in becoming AEW World Champion, but failed to win the title from Kenny Omega at Redemption on July 26. On August 30 at All In, Knight lost the TNT Championship to Darby Allin in a Falls Count Anywhere match, ending his reign at 142 days. On September 26 at All Out, Knight and stablemate Kyle Fletcher defeated Darby Allin and Steven Borden to become the number one contenders for the AEW World Tag Team Championship. On October 17 at WrestleDream, Knight and Fletcher failed to win the titles from The Young Bucks (Matt Jackson and Nick Jackson). On November 4, Knight and his stablemates competed in a Blood and Guts match at the namesake event, where they were victorious.

=== Impact Wrestling / Total Nonstop Action Wrestling (2023–2024) ===
Knight debuted for Impact Wrestling on the January 26, 2023 episode of Impact!, teaming with Kushida to defeat The Good Hands (Jason Hotch and John Skyler). On March 30, at Multiverse United, a co-produced show between Impact and NJPW, Knight competed in a six-way scramble match for Trey Miguel's Impact X Division Championship, where Miguel retained the title. At Slammiversary on July 15, Knight faced Alan Angels, Jake Something, Jonathan Gresham, Kushida and Mike Bailey in a six-way Ultimate X match to determine the number one contender for the Impact X Division Championship, which was won by Kushida. At Impact 1000 on September 14, he competed in the 20-man Feast or Fired match in a losing effort. In a September 2024 interview with Fightful, Knight claimed that he was no longer in TNA's plans in potential storylines and matches and that he would be moving forward in NJPW.

=== Consejo Mundial de Lucha Libre (2023–present) ===
On September 16, 2023, Knight made his debut in Mexico for Consejo Mundial de Lucha Libre (CMLL) at the CMLL 90th Anniversary Show, teaming with Rocky Romero and TJP in a loss to Atlantis Jr., Mascara Dorada and Místico. He returned at Fantastica Mania México on June 20, 2025, losing to Neón. On the April 3, 2026 episode of Viernes Espectacular ("Spectacular Fridays"), JetSpeed and Místico successfully defended their AEW World Trios Championship against El Clon, Hechicero and Volador Jr. of the Don Callis Family. The next night, JetSpeed defeated Los Hermanos Chávez (Ángel de Oro and Niebla Roja) at the Arena Coliseo 83rd Anniversary Show. At Semana Internacional ("International Week") on August 4, Knight, now a heel, successfully defended his AEW TNT Championship against Titán.

== Personal life ==
Knight is currently in a relationship with fellow wrestler Jamara Garrett, also known as Mara Sadè or Jakara Jackson.

== Championships and accomplishments ==
Knight is a one-time AEW TNT Champion and holds the record for most successful title defenses

- All Elite Wrestling
  - AEW TNT Championship (1 time)
  - AEW World Trios Championship (2 times) – with Adam Page and Mike Bailey (2) and Místico
- New Japan Pro-Wrestling
  - IWGP Junior Heavyweight Tag Team Championship (2 times) – with Kushida
- Pro Wrestling Illustrated
  - Ranked No. 24 of the top 500 singles wrestlers in the PWI 500 in 2026
