= Chris Bey =

American professional wrestler (born 1996)

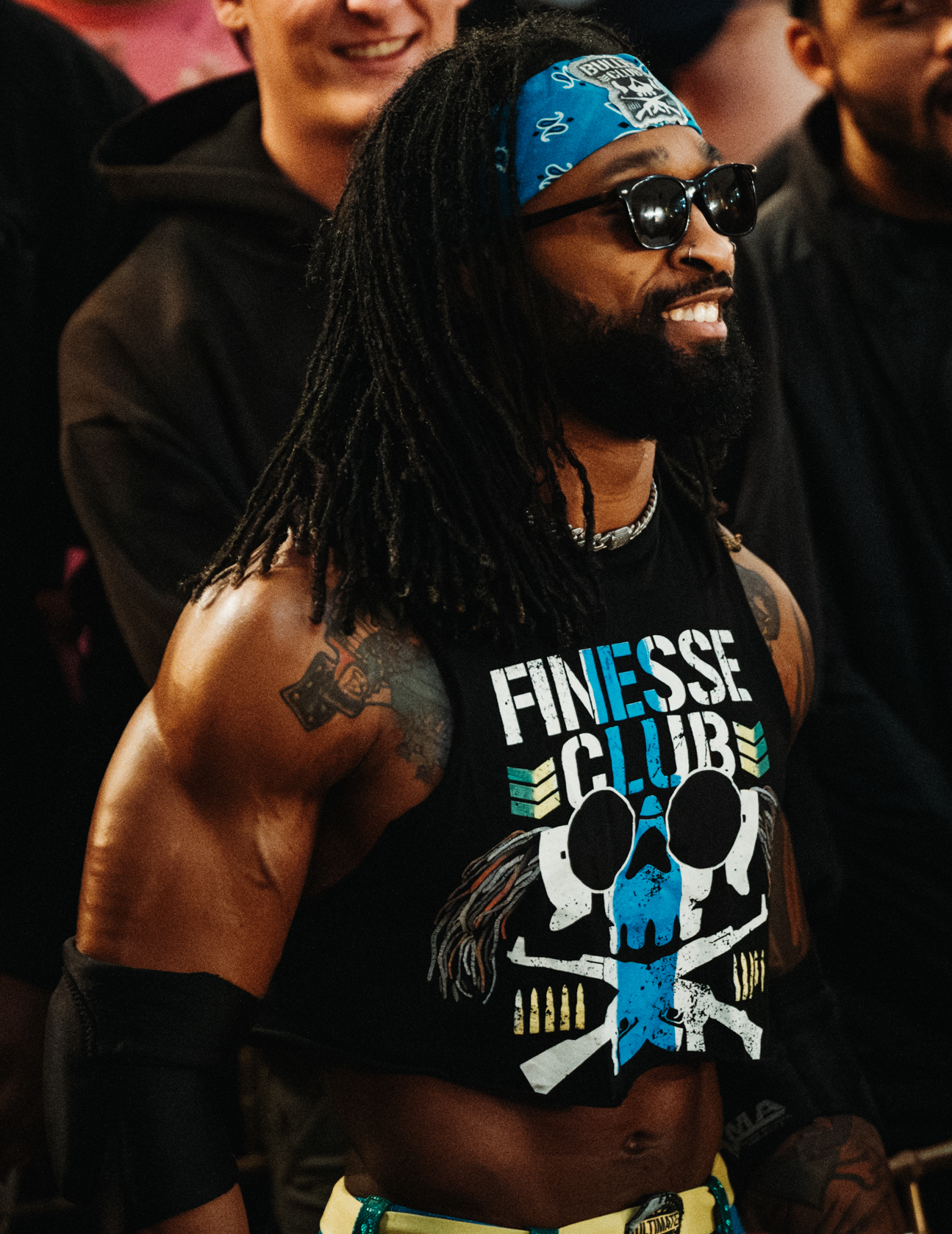
- Bey in 2024

Personal information
- Born: Daquan Christopher Johnson-Bey; February 13, 1996 (age 30) Alexandria, Virginia, United States

Professional wrestling career
- Ring names: Chris Bey; Chris Strong
- Billed height: 5 ft 9 in (175 cm)
- Billed weight: 171 lb (78 kg)
- Billed from: The Bey Area, AVA
- Trained by: Future Stars of Wrestling
- Debut: October 30, 2016

Daquan Christopher Johnson-Bey (born February 13, 1996), better known by the ring name Chris Bey, is an American professional wrestler. He is signed to Total Nonstop Action Wrestling (TNA), but has been on hiatus due to a broken neck that he suffered in October 2024. He is also known for his work on the independent scene. He has also made appearances for New Japan Pro-Wrestling, where he was a member of Bullet Club.

== Professional wrestling career ==
=== Independent circuit (2017–2024) ===
Chris Bey began his wrestling career at Future Stars of Wrestling (FSW) in Las Vegas under the name Chris Strong. Here he trained under Disco Inferno, Kenny King, Sinn Bodhi FKA Kizarny, and Kevin Kross aka Karrion Kross. Shortly after beginning training Bey made his debut at Big Valley Wrestling in a tag match with partner Heck Dynamite where they would be known as “Dynamite Strong”. In late 2017, Bey would start wrestling for PCW Ultra and in his debut match, he defeated Adrian Quest. Then a month later on October 6, he would defeat Hammerstone before going on a three-match losing streak in the promotion. During his brief losing streak, Bey would lose to the likes of Jake Atlas and A. C. H. Bey made his WWE debut as an enhancement talent on the October 11, 2019, episode of 205 Live where he lost to Ariya Daivari.

=== Impact Wrestling / Total Nonstop Action Wrestling (2018–present) ===
==== Early beginnings (2018–2019) ====
On the November 29, 2018, episode of Impact!, Bey made his first Impact Wrestling appearance when he teamed with Mike Sydal, as both unsuccessfully challenged The Rascalz (Dezmond Xavier and Zachary Wentz) Before officially signing with Impact on February 19, 2020, Bey made couple more appearances during the late 2018 and 2019 where he would face the likes of Luchasaurus, Peter Avalon, Daga and Jake Crist . On the March 17 episode of Impact!, Bey had his first victory on Impact Wrestling, when he defeated Damian Drake.

==== X Division Champion (2020–2021) ====
During the second night of Rebellion, which aired on April 28, Bey defeated Rohit Raju, Suicide and Trey in his Impact pay-per-view debut, establishing himself as an X Division performer. Bey received his first Impact X Division Championship match on the May 5 episode of Impact!, where he and Ace Austin unsuccessfully challenged the X Division Champion Willie Mack in a three-way match. After Mack successfully retained his championship against Johnny Swinger on the May 19 episode of Impact!, Bey attacked Mack along with Swinger, solidifying himself as a heel in the process. On June 25, Impact announced that Bey would challenged Mack for the X Division Championship on Slammiversary, after he pinned Mack in a six-man tag team match. At the Slammiversary, Bey defeated Mack to win the X Division Championship. On the August 18 episode of Impact's Emergence - Night 1, Bey lost the championship to Rohit Raju in a three-way match that also involved TJP, thus ending his reign at only 31 days. After losing the X Division title, Bey quietly moved towards the main event scene where he competed for the Impact World Championship. On December 12 at Final Resolution, Bey lost to champion Rich Swann in his first world title opportunity.

==== Bullet Club and ABC (2021–2024) ====
Bey competed in an Ultimate X Match for the X-Division at the Slammiversary 2021, but the match was won by Josh Alexander. Backstage after the match, Bey found a Bullet Club shirt on his chair in the locker room, teasing him joining the group. The following week, the newly debuted Jay White questioned if Bey had accepted his offer to join Bullet Club, though Bey initially declined, White told him to think about the offer. On the July 29 episode of Impact, White and Bey teamed for the first time losing to Impact World Tag Team Champions Doc Gallows and Karl Anderson. The following week, Bey defeated Juice Robinson and officially joined Bullet Club after the match.

On the March 2, 2023 episode of Impact, Bey along with Ace Austin defeated The Motor City Machine Guns to win the Impact World Tag Team Championship for the first time in his career. On July 15, at Slammiversary, Bey and Austin lost the tag titles to Subculture in a four-way tag team match also involving Rich Swann and Sami Callihan, and Moose and Brian Myers, thanks to The Rascalz interfering in the match. On September 14 at Impact 1000, Bey grabbed the Impact World Tag Team Championship briefcase during the Feast or Fired match. On October 5, Impact announced that Bey and Austin would invoke this opportunity at Bound for Glory for the Impact World Tag Team Championship against The Rascalz. At Bound for Glory, Bey and Austin defeated The Rascalz to become Impact Tag Team Champions for the second time in their careers.

On March 8, 2024, at Sacrifice, Bey and Austin lost the tag titles to The System members Brian Myers and Eddie Edwards, ending their reign at 134 days, only to regained them at Slammiversary on July 20. On September 13 at Victory Road, Bey and Austin lost the tag titles back to Myers and Edwards, ending their third reign at 55 days.

==== Career-threatening injury and non-wrestling appearances (2024–present) ====
On the October 27 tapings of Impact, Bey suffered a legitimate injury during his and Austin's match against The Hardys. The match was immediately called off by the referee and Bey was stretchered out and taken to a nearby hospital, where he received surgery. The details of his injury were kept private and a GoFundMe was later set up to help fund his recovery. On January 21, 2025, Rob Van Dam gave an update on Bey, stating that Bey suffered a broken neck but was no longer paralyzed. On February 13, Bey posted a video of himself walking and gave an update on his injury, stating he received a C6-C7 neck fusion and a C6-T1 spinal cord fusion and was given a 10% to 25% chance of ever walking again. On March 23, 2025, Future Stars of Wrestling (FSW) held a benefit show, with appearances by wrestlers from various promotions such as AEW, WWE, and TNA. Bey made his first appearance since the incident to close the event.

Bey would also continue to make appearances for TNA, including at Unbreakable to give an update on his recovery and thanked the fans for their support, at Bound for Glory to announced that the show set a new TNA attendance record of 7,794, and at Sacrifice to announced the signing of Ricky Sosa.

=== Ring of Honor (2019) ===
Bey made his Ring of Honor (ROH) debut on the March 16, 2019 tapings of ROH TV where he defeated Damian Drake in a Future of Honor match. His next appearance was another dark match on September 28 at Death Before Dishonor XVII, where he teamed up with Slice Boogie in a losing effort against Josh Woods and Silas Young.

=== New Japan Pro-Wrestling (2020–2023) ===
On November 2, 2020, Bey was announced for New Japan Pro-Wrestling's Super J-Cup tournament. On December 12, Bey defeated Clark Connors in the first round of the tournament but ultimately failed to defeat eventual runner up A. C. H. in the semifinals.

On September 25, 2021, Bey, El Phantasmo, Taiji Ishimori, and Hikuleo would team up as the Bullet Club for the first time collectively as they defeated Clark Connors, Lio Rush, TJP, and Juice Robinson. The next day, Bey would take his first NJPW loss since joining Bullet Club when he and El Phantasmo lost to Chris Dickinson and former Bullet Club member Robbie Eagles.

At All Star Junior Festival USA 2023, Bey, Alex Shelley, Kosei Fujita and Robbie Eagles defeated Ace Austin, Cheeseburger, TJP, and Yoshinobu Kanemaru in a Lucky Dip Eight-man tag team match.

== Music career ==
On September 20, 2021, Chris Bey dropped a single by the name of "Time" on his YouTube channel that also made it on ITunes. On September 20, 2022, Chris Bey released a music video on his YouTube channel by the name of "Best Version". On January 31, 2023, Chris Bey released another music video on his YouTube channel by the name of "Real Life". On July 23, 2023, Chris Bey released a music video by the name of "Call Back" on his music topic YouTube channel. Chris Bey also has several other different songs, tracks and albums on his music topic YouTube channel as well.

== Championships and accomplishments ==
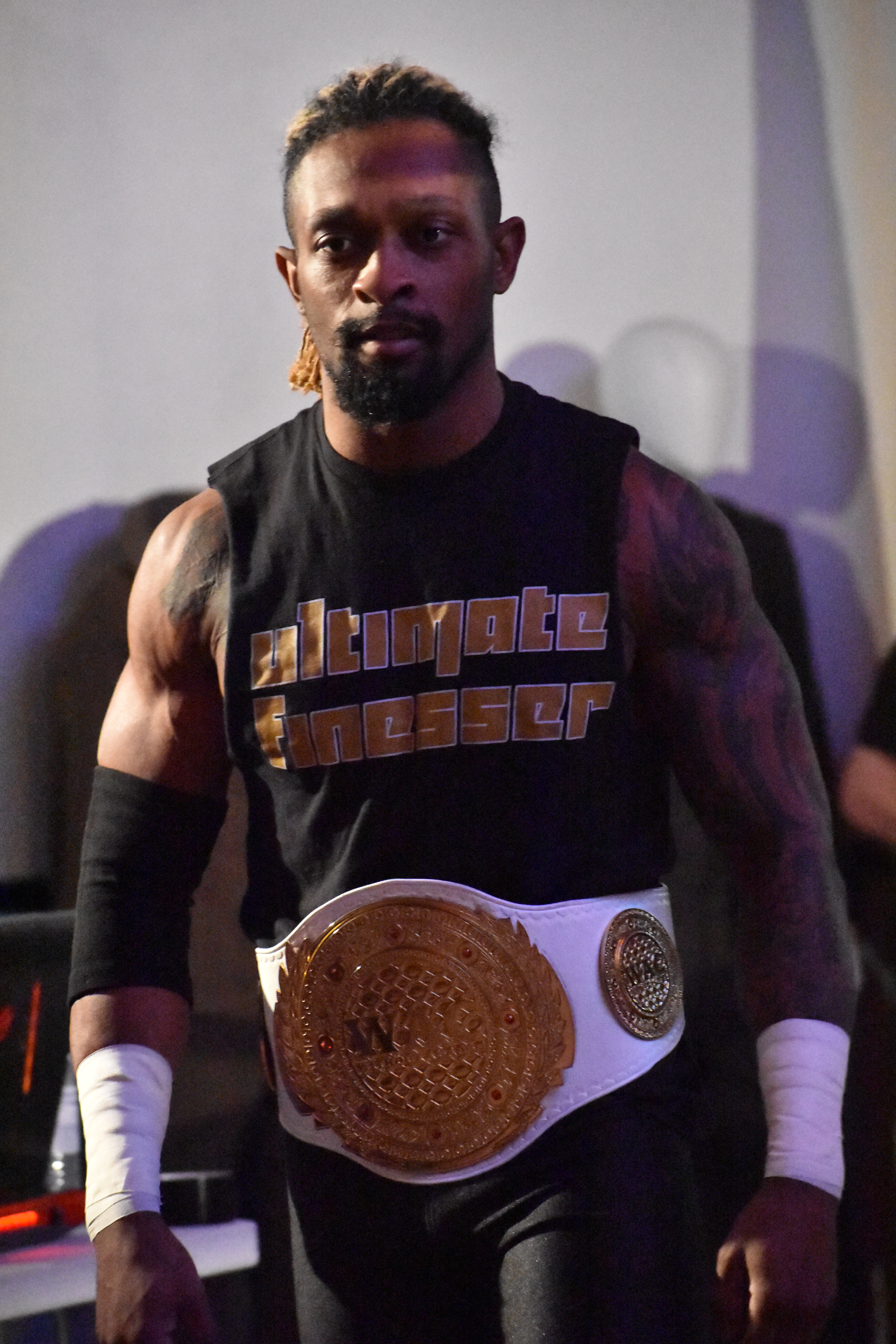
Bey as WAC Champion in 2020

- All Pro Wrestling/Gold Rush Pro Wrestling
  - APW Junior Heavyweight Championship (1 time, final)
  - Young Lions Cup (2017)
- Cauliflower Alley Club
  - Courage Award (2025)
- Championship Wrestling from Hollywood
  - UWN Tag Team Championship (1 time) – with Suede Thompson
- Future Stars of Wrestling
  - FSW Heavyweight Championship (1 time)
  - FSW Mecca Grand Championship (1 time, current)
  - FSW No Limits Championship (2 times)
  - FSW Tag Team Championship (3 times) – with Nino Black (1), Suede Thompson (1) and Ace Austin (1)
- Maverick Pro Wrestling
  - Maverick Pro Heavyweight Championship (1 time)
  - Maverick Revolution Championship (1 time)
- Platinum Pro Wrestling
  - PPW Platinumweight Championship (1 time)
- Pro Wrestling Illustrated
  - Ranked No. 94 of the top 500 singles wrestlers in the PWI 500 in 2021
- The Wrestling Revolver
  - Revolver World Championship (1 time)
  - Revolver World Tag Team Championship (2 times) – with Ace Austin
- Total Nonstop Action Wrestling / Impact Wrestling
  - Impact X Division Championship (1 time)
  - TNA/Impact World Tag Team Championship (3 times) – with Ace Austin
  - Super X Cup (2021)
  - Feast or Fired (2023 – Tag Team Championship contract)
  - Impact/TNA Year End Awards (4 times)
    - One to Watch in 2021 (2020)
    - Male Tag Team of the Year (2023, 2024) with Ace Austin
    - Inspirational Wrestler of the Year (2025)
- Without a Cause
  - WAC Championship (1 time)
- Wrestlings Best of the West
  - BOTW Championship (1 time)
