= List of Maple Leaf Pro Wrestling events =

List of events in Maple Leaf Pro Wrestling

This is a list of events held and promoted by Maple Leaf Pro Wrestling, a professional wrestling promotion based in Canada which was founded by Scott D'Amore. Over the course of its history, it has held 9 major events and 11 house shows. The majority of the events were streamed and made available on the Triller TV streaming service.

== List of events ==
=== 2024 ===
Event	Date	Location	Venue	Main event	Notes	Ref
Forged in Excellence	October 19	Windsor, Ontario, Canada	St. Clair College Sportsplex	Konosuke Takeshita vs. Mike Bailey		
Forged in Excellence	October 20	Windsor, Ontario, Canada	St. Clair College Sportsplex	Konosuke Takeshita (c) vs. Josh Alexander for the AEW International Championship		
(c) – refers to the champion(s) heading into the match

=== 2025 ===
Event	Date	Location	Venue	Main event	Notes	Ref
Mayhem	March 14	Windsor, Ontario, Canada	St. Clair College Sportsplex	Thom Latimer (c) vs. Bishop Dyer for the NWA World Heavyweight Championship		
Mayhem	March 15	Windsor, Ontario, Canada	St. Clair College Sportsplex	Intergalactic Jet Setters (Kevin Knight and Kushida) vs. The Kingdom (Matt Taven and Mike Bennett)		
Northern Rising	May 10	Toronto, Ontario, Canada	Mattamy Athletic Centre	Gauntlet for the Gold for the inaugural MLP Canadian Championship		
Fantastic Fathers 2025	June 14	Windsor, Ontario, Canada	St. Clair College Sportsplex	Rhyno vs. Raj Singh (w/Johnny Bradford)	Non-televised event	
Resurrection	July 5	Laval, Quebec, Canada	Colisée de Laval	PCO (c) vs. Dan Maff in a House of Pain match for the Canadian International Heavyweight Championship with Billy Gunn as the special guest referee		
Downtown Showdown 2025	July 26	Windsor, Ontario, Canada	Intersection of Ouellette Avenue and University Avenue	The Good Brothers (Doc Gallows and Karl Anderson) vs. Bryce Hansen and Sheldon Jean	Non-televised event	
Sacred Ground	September 5 (aired September 11)	Ohsweken, Ontario, Canada	Six Nations Sports & Cultural Memorial Centre	Josh Alexander (c) vs. TJP for the MLP Canadian Championship		
Reena Rumble	October 27	Toronto, Ontario, Canada	NewAge Experience Centre	Mike Santana vs. Sheldon Jean		
(c) – refers to the champion(s) heading into the match

=== 2026 ===
Event	Date	Location	Venue	Main event	Notes	Ref
Global Wars Canada	March 27	Windsor, Ontario, Canada	St. Clair College Sportsplex	The Good Brothers (Karl Anderson and Doc Gallows) vs. Kaito Kiyomiya and Bishop Dyer vs. GOA (Toa Liona and Bishop Kaun) vs. Bryce Hanson and Sheldon Jean for the inaugural MLP Canadian Tag Team Championship	Co-produced with Ring of Honor	
Uprising	March 28	Windsor, Ontario, Canada	St. Clair College Sportsplex	Stu Grayson vs. Jay Lethal vs. Rich Swann vs. Rohan Raja vs. Jonathan Gresham vs. Michael Oku in an Elimination Gauntlet match for the interim MLP Canadian Championship		
Multiverse	April 17	Las Vegas, Nevada, USA	Palms Casino Resort	The Rascalz (Dezmond Xavier, Myron Reed, and Zachary Wentz) vs. Amazing Red and El Sky Team (Místico and Mascara Dorada)	Held in conjunction with Palms Slam Fest	
LIUNA!625 Family Day	May 24	Windsor, Ontario, Canada	LIUNA! 625 Training Center	1st Faction. (Sheldon Jean and Bryce Hansen) (c) vs. Psycho Mike and Tarik for the MLP Canadian Tag Team Championship	Non-televised event	
Fantastic Fathers 2026	June 20	Windsor, Ontario, Canada	St. Clair College Sportsplex	Psycho Mike vs. Sheldon Jean	Non-televised event	
Essex Fun Fest	July 5	Essex, Ontario, Canada	Essex Centre Sports Complex	Psycho Mike vs. Jax Williams	Non-televised event	
Headlocks For Hospice	July 24	Chatham, Ontario, Canada	Sons of Kent Brewing Company	Psycho Mike vs. Mark Wheeler vs. Rohan Raja with D'Lo Brown as the special guest enforcer	Non-televised event	
Downtown Showdown	July 25	Windsor, Ontario, Canada	Intersection Of Ouellette Avenue & University Avenue	Bryce Hansen vs. El Reverso with D'Lo Brown as the special guest enforcer	Non-televised event	
WrestleFest	August 15	Hamilton, Ontario, Canada	Hamilton Stadium	Stu Grayson (c) vs. Jonny DeLuca for the interim MLP Canadian Championship	Non-televised event Held in conjunction with Hamilton Tiger-Cats home game against the Saskatchewan Roughriders.	
Sacred Ground 2026	September 11	Ohsweken, Ontario, Canada	Six Nations Sports & Cultural Memorial Centre	1st Faction (Sheldon Jean, Brent Banks and Bryce Hansen) vs. Erick Redbeard, Joseph Sawyer, and Evil Uno with Jacques Rougeau as the special guest enforcer	Non-televised event	
Cottam Fair	September 13	Cottam, Ontario, Canada	Rotary Club of Cottam	Sheldon Jean vs. El Reverso	Non-televised event Held in conjunction with Cottam Rotary Fall Fair.	
MAPLE LEAF PRO Wrestling X London Comic Con	September 26–27	London, Ontario, Canada	Western Fair District J-AAR Expo Centre	Stu Grayson (c) vs. Bryce Hansen for the interim MLP Canadian Championship	Non-televised event Held in conjunction with London Сomic Con.	
Northern Rising	October 3	Toronto, Ontario, Canada	Mattamy Athletic Centre at Maple Leaf Gardens	Adam Copeland vs. Steve Maclin in a Street Fight		
(c) – refers to the champion(s) heading into the match

== Upcoming ==
2026

Event	Date	Location	Venue	Main event	Notes	Ref
(c) – refers to the champion(s) heading into the match

== Number of events by year ==
- Overall total – 22
- 2024 - 1
- 2025 - 8
- 2026 - 13
