= MLP Sacred Ground =

2025 Maple Leaf Pro Wrestling event

Sacred Ground
- Promotional poster of the event
- Promotion: Maple Leaf Pro Wrestling
- Date: September 5, 2025 (aired September 11, 2025)
- City: Ohsweken, Ontario, Canada
- Venue: Six Nations Sports & Cultural Memorial Centre

Pay-per-view chronology
← Previous; Resurrection	Next → Reena Rumble

Sacred Ground chronology
← Previous; First	Next → 2026

Sacred Ground was a professional wrestling event promoted by Canadian promotion Maple Leaf Pro Wrestling (MLP). It took place on September 5, 2025, at the 6 Nations Territory in Ohsweken, Ontario, but was streamed on YouTube on September 11, 2025, and featured independent wrestlers and contracted wrestlers from various promotions around the world such as All Elite Wrestling.

The event was originally scheduled to be an untelevised house show, until MLP rescinded and made the show a livestreaming event due to overwhelming fan demand.

== Production ==
=== Storylines ===
Other on-screen personnel
Role	Name
Commentators	Mark Roberts
Commentators	Veda Scott
Commentators	Jimmy Jacobs
Commentators	D'Lo Brown
Commentators	Evil Uno

MLP Sacred Ground featured eight different professional wrestling matches that involved different wrestlers from pre-existing scripted feuds and storylines. Wrestlers were portrayed as either villains or heroes in the scripted events that built tension and culminated in a wrestling match involving.

== Results ==
No.	Results	Stipulations	Times
1	Billy Gunn, Psycho Mike and Bhupinder Gujjar defeated Brent Banks, Bryce Hansen and Sheldon Jean by pinfall	Six-man tag team match	10:23
2	Jesse Bieber and Raj Singh defeated El Reverso and Mo Jabari by pinfall	Tag team match	8:15
3	"The Nomad" Bishop Dyer defeated Rohan Raja (c) (with Aurora Teves) by disqualification	Singles match for the PWA Champions Grail	13:13
4	PCO and Shotzi Blackheart defeated Kris Chambers and Taylor Rising by pinfall	Mixed tag team match	10:58
5	Stu Grayson defeated Tarik and Ace Austin by pinfall	Three-way match	15:38
6	The Good Brothers (Doc Gallows and Karl Anderson) defeated The Flatliners (Asylum and Matt Burns) by pinfall	Tag team match	8:28
7	Gisele Shaw (MLP) defeated Priscilla Kelly (Destiny) by pinfall	Winner Takes All match for the MLP Women's Canadian Championship and Destiny Wrestling Women's Championship	12:20
8	Josh Alexander (c) defeated TJP by submission	Singles match for the MLP Canadian Championship	25:49
(c) / – the champion(s) heading into the match

== See also ==
- List of Maple Leaf Pro Wrestling events
