= MLP Mayhem (TV program) =

Canadian professional wrestling television program

- Logo
- Genre: Professional wrestling
- Created by: Maple Leaf Pro Wrestling
- Presented by: Mauro Ranallo (play-by-play commentator); Don Callis (colour commentator)
- Starring: Maple Leaf Pro Wrestling roster
- Country of origin: Canada
- Original language: English
- No. of episodes: 12

Production
- Producer: Scott D'Amore
- Camera setup: Multicamera setup
- Production company: Maple Leaf Pro Wrestling

Original release
- Network: TSN2
- Release: July 15, 2026 – present

MLP Mayhem is a professional wrestling television program produced by Maple Leaf Pro Wrestling (MLP) which premiered on July 15, 2026 on TSN2 in Canada and on MyAEW worldwide.

== History ==
On April 14, 2024, Michael E. Dockins filed a trademark for "Maple Leaf Wrestling". The address listed on the filing was for Border City Wrestling (BCW), owned by former Total Nonstop Action Wrestling (TNA) president Scott D’Amore.

On August 8, D’Amore announced a relaunch of the Maple Leaf Wrestling brand dubbed Maple Leaf Pro Wrestling (MLP). Its inaugural two-night event, "Forged in Excellence", took place on October 19 and 20 at the St. Clair College Sportsplex in Windsor, Ontario, Canada, and streamed live on Triller TV.

The promotion has since began uploading archival footage of the original Maple Leaf Wrestling, as well as classic content from BCW, on its new YouTube channel and social media platforms.

On August 19, 2024, MLP announced the formation of the Pro Wrestling Alliance (PWA) with Qatar Pro Wrestling (QPW) and Oceania Pro Wrestling (OPW). The promotion announced Mauro Ranallo as "The Voice" of MLP; handling announcing, promotional vignettes, commercials and match previews, and All Elite Wrestling (AEW) personality Don Callis as colour commentator.

On October 7, 2024, MLP and the PWA announced Rohan Raja and Jake Something would compete on night one of "Forged in Excellence" for the inaugural Champion’s Grail, a title to be defended across all PWA members. On Night One at Forged in Excellence, Raja defeated Something to become the inaugural PWA Champion's Grail holder.

MLP held their first event of 2025, Mayhem, at the St. Clair College Sportsplex from March 14-15. A third event, Northern Rising, was held on May 10 at Maple Leaf Gardens, where they crowned Josh Alexander as their inaugural MLP Canadian Champion and Gisele Shaw as their inaugural MLP Canadian Women's Champion.

During Global Wars Canada on March 27, 2026, MLP announced a television deal with The Sports Network (TSN) that will see a weekly television show, MLP Mayhem, begin airing in July 2026. On March 28, 2026 during the Uprising pay-per-view, Maple Leaf Pro Wrestling would announce television tapings for the show which are set to take place on June 12, 2026, June 13, 2026, August 7, 2026, and August 8, 2026 at the St. Clair College Sportsplex in Windsor, Ontario, Canada. On April 20, 2026, Maple Leaf Pro Wrestling announced that the show would air in a seasonal format with 12 episodes being taped for the first season. On April 25, 2026, Maple Leaf Pro Wrestling would announce that interim MLP Canadian Champion Stu Grayson, Jay Lethal, the New Age Outlaws (Road Dogg and Billy Gunn), Bishop Dyer, Blake Christian, Rohan Raja, MLP Canadian Women's Champion Gisele Shaw, Rhino, and Dani Luna would participate during the first two tapings.

On June 12, 2026, MLP announced that Mayhem would premiere on July 15, 2026 on TSN2 at Midnight Eastern Standard Time. On July 10, 2026, MLP announced that they had signed a streaming deal with MyAEW to air Mayhem worldwide.
