= Q Pro Wrestling =

Qatari professional wrestling promotion

- Founded: 2013
- Headquarters: Doha, Qatar
- Founder: Ali Marafi
- Owner: Ali Marafi
- Formerly: Qatar Pro Wrestling
- Website: qpw-wrestling.com

Q Pro Wrestling (QPW), formerly known as Qatar Pro Wrestling, is a professional wrestling promotion based in Doha, Qatar. The promotion is also a member of the Pro Wrestling Alliance which also has Maple Leaf Pro Wrestling (MLP) and Oceania Pro Wrestling (OPW) as founding members.

== History ==
Prior to the establishment of QPW, former WWE wrestler Caprice Coleman was advocating to get a ban on professional wrestling in Kuwait lifted which eventually did get lifted in 2009. Ali Marafi, who would later found QPW, had booked Coleman on a tour on his final months in the country.

On October 3, 2013, QPW held its first event at the Hyatt Plaza in Doha, Qatar. The event featured wrestlers such as Carlito, Chris Masters, Rene Dupree, and Matt Cross with the main event of the show being Bobby Lashley taking on Alofa. On October 5, 2013, QPW crowned their first champion when Chris Raaber defeated Alofa and Bobby Lashley in a three-way match. From April 4, 2015 to April 14, 2015, QPW held a multi-day tournament to crown the inaugural Souq Waqif Champion during the Souq Waqif Celebrations festival in Doha, Qatar at Eastern Square. On the final day of the tournament, QPW crowned their inaugural King of Ladders Champion with Caprice Coleman becoming the inaugural champion after defeating Johnny Moss, Jonny Storm, Mexx in a four-way match. Despite Coleman's victory, he lost to Matt Cross the following match.

On August 19, 2024, Maple Leaf Pro Wrestling (MLP), Oceania Pro Wrestling (OPW), and Qatar Pro Wrestling (QPW) formed the Pro Wrestling Alliance (PWA) to work together on talent exchange and other collaborations. On October 20, 2024, El Reverso defeated Classy Ali during MLP's Forged in Excellence pay-per-view in Windsor, Ontario, Canada to become the second wrestler to hold the QPW Championship.

On February 22, 2025, Matt Cardona won the vacant QPW Middle East Championship after defeating Nic Nemeth at QPW's SuperSlam III event. During this event, Mustafa Ali defeated Real1 to win the QPW World Championship. During the SuperSlam III event, Miro wrestled his first match since 2023.

== Championships ==
=== Current ===
Championship	Current champion(s)	Date won	Days held	Location	Notes
QPW Championship	Mustafa Ali	February 22, 2025	614+	Doha, Qatar	Defeated Real1 at SuperSlam III to win the vacant championship.
QPW King of Ladders Championship	Shaheen	February 21, 2025	615+	Doha, Qatar	Defeated Real1 at SuperSlam III to win the vacant championship.
QPW Tag Team Championship	Anas Rex and Sam X	August 28, 2026	615+	Doha, Qatar	Defeated Abu Zada and NF Nitro at QPW Underground to win the vacant championship.
PWA Champions Grail	Stu Grayson	June 13, 2026	138+	Windsor, Ontario, Canada	Defeated Rohan Raja in a Winner Takes All match at MLP Mayhem in which Grayson's interim MLP Canadian Championship was also on the line.

=== Former ===
Championship	Current champion(s)	Date won	Days held	Location	Notes
QPW Souq Waqif Championship	John Morrison	April 14, 2015	N/A	Doha, Qatar	Defeated Alofa to win the championship.
QPW Middle East Championship	Matt Cardona	February 22, 2025	314	Doha, Qatar	Defeated Nic Nemeth at SuperSlam III win the vacant championship.
