= MLP Resurrection =

2025 Maple Leaf Pro Wrestling event

Resurrection
- Promotional poster of the event
- Promotion: Maple Leaf Pro Wrestling
- Date: July 5, 2025
- City: Laval, Quebec, Canada
- Venue: Colisée de Laval

Pay-per-view chronology
← Previous; Northern Rising	Next → Sacred Ground

Resurrection was a professional wrestling pay-per-view produced by Canadian promotion Maple Leaf Pro Wrestling (MLP). It took place at the Colisée de Laval in Laval, Quebec, Canada. It streamed on Triller TV on July 5, 2025. It featured independent wrestlers and contracted wrestlers from various promotions around the world such as All Elite Wrestling, National Wrestling Alliance and New Japan Pro-Wrestling.

== Production ==
=== Background ===
On May 11, 2025, MLP announced that they would hold their first show in the Canadian province of Quebec titled Resurrection with the first wrestler being featured at the confirmed as PCO. On June 8, 2025, MLP announced that former WWE wrestler Shotzi Blackheart would be featured in the event. On June 11, Shotzi would be confirmed to be challenging Gisele Shaw for the MLP Canadian Women's Championship.

On May 29, 2025, it was announced that Thom Latimer would defend the NWA Worlds Heavyweight Championship against former champion Matt Cardona. This would be the third time that an NWA championship would be defended in MLP.

On the day of the event, PWInsider had reported that the show was "just shy of a sellout".

=== Storylines ===
Other on-screen personnel
Role:	Name:
Commentators	Joe Dombrowski
Commentators	Don Callis
Ring announcer	Jade Chung

Resurrection featured multiple professional wrestling matches that involved different wrestlers from pre-existing scripted feuds and storylines. Storylines were produced on various Maple Leaf Pro Wrestling events.

== Results ==
No.	Results	Stipulations	Times
1^{P}	El Reverso, Mathis Myre and Mo Jabari defeated Franky The Mobster, Marko Estrada and Zak Patterson by pinfall	Six-man tag team match	—
2	The Dark Order (Stu Grayson and Evil Uno) defeated Sheldon Jean and Bryce Hansen by pinfall (Note: This match was originally a singles match between Grayson and Jean but was restarted as a tag team match by Director of Authority Santino Marella.)	Tag team match	4:38
3	Rohan Raja (c) (with Aurora) defeated Hammerstone by pinfall	Singles match for the PWA Champions Grail	11:46
4	Thom Latimer (c) defeated Matt Cardona by pinfall	Singles match for the NWA Worlds Heavyweight Championship	10:35
5	Michael Allen Richard Clark defeated "Speedball" Mike Bailey, Jonathan Gresham, TJP, Bhupinder Gujjar, "Psycho" Mike Rollins by pinfall	Six-way scramble	14:26
6	The Good Brothers (Doc Gallows and Karl Anderson) defeated Bullet Club War Dogs (David Finlay and Drilla Moloney) by pinfall	Tag team match	11:36
7	Gisele Shaw (c) defeated Shotzi Blackheart by pinfall	Singles match for the MLP Women's Canadian Championship	17:23
8	Josh Alexander (c) defeated Ace Austin by pinfall	Singles match for the MLP Canadian Championship	20:16
9	PCO (c) defeated Dan Maff (with Jimmy Jacobs) by pinfall	House of Pain match for the Canadian International Heavyweight Championship; Billy Gunn served as the special guest referee.	16:05
(c) / – the champion(s) heading into the match; P / – the match was broadcast on the pre-show
