= Pro Wrestling Alliance =

Professional wrestling governing body

- Acronym: PWA
- Founded: 2024
- Style: Professional wrestling
- Founder(s): Scott D'Amore (MLP); GLO Sports (OPW); Ali Marafi (QPW)

The Pro Wrestling Alliance is a governing body for professional wrestling promotions that was formed in 2024 by the Canada-based promotion Maple Leaf Pro Wrestling (MLP), the Qatar-based promotion Q Pro Wrestling (QPW), and the Australia-based Oceania Pro Wrestling (OPW).

== History ==
On August 19, 2024, Maple Leaf Pro Wrestling (MLP), Oceania Pro Wrestling (OPW), and Qatar Pro Wrestling (QPW) formed the Pro Wrestling Alliance (PWA) to work together on talent exchange and other collaborations.

On October 7, 2024, MLP announced that they would crown an inaugural PWA Champion's Grail holder on October 19, during the first night of Forged in Excellence. The origins of the Champion's Grail goes back to July 1, 1962, when Rikidōzan and Toyonobori defeated Buddy Austin and Mike Sharpe to win the Japan Pro Wrestling Alliance's Toyonaka tournament, awarding them the trophy that would become the first Champion's Grail. On December 15, 1963, Rikidōzan was murdered, and his family preserved his original Champion's Grail trophy in their home for over 60 years.

On October 19, 2024 during the first night of Maple Leaf Pro Wrestling's Forged in Excellence pay-per-view in Windsor, Ontario, "Ravenous" Rohan Raja defeated Jake Something to become the inaugural PWA Champions Grail Champion.

== Members ==
| Promotion | Abbreviation | Owner | Date joined |
|---|---|---|---|
| Maple Leaf Pro Wrestling | MLP | Scott D'Amore | October 19, 2024 |
| Q Pro Wrestling | QPW | Ali Marafi | August 19, 2024 |
| Oceania Pro Wrestling | OPW | GLO Sports | August 19, 2024 |

== Current champions ==
As of November 17, 2026

Singles

| Championship | Current champion(s) | Date won | Days held | Location | Notes |
|---|---|---|---|---|---|
| PWA Champions Grail | Stu Grayson | June 13, 2026 | 157+ | Windsor, Ontario | Defeated Rohan Raja at MLP Mayhem. |
