= MLP Reena Rumble =

2025 Maple Leaf Pro Wrestling event

Reena Rumble
- Promotion: Maple Leaf Pro Wrestling
- Date: October 27, 2025
- City: Toronto, Ontario, Canada
- Venue: NewAge Experience Centre
- Attendance: 500

Maple Leaf Pro Wrestling event chronology
← Previous; Sacred Ground	Next → Global Wars Canada

Reena Rumble was a professional wrestling event promoted by Canadian promotion Maple Leaf Pro Wrestling (MLP). It took place on October 27, 2025, at the NewAge Experience Centre in Toronto, Ontario, Canada, and featured independent wrestlers and contracted wrestlers from various promotions around the world such as All Elite Wrestling, Total Nonstop Action Wrestling, and Major League Wrestling.

== Production ==
=== Storylines ===
Other on-screen personnel
Role	Name
Commentators	Aron Stevens
Commentators	Reid Duthie

MLP Reena Rumble featured ten different professional wrestling matches that involved different wrestlers from pre-existing scripted feuds and storylines. Wrestlers were portrayed as either villains or heroes in the scripted events that built tension and culminated in a wrestling match involving.

== Results ==
No.	Results	Stipulations	Times
1^{P}	Bryce Hansen defeated Jimmy Townsend by pinfall	Singles match	—
2	Evil Uno defeated D-Man Parker by pinfall	Singles match	7:58
3	El Reverso defeated Alessandro Del Bruno and Jesse Bieber by pinfall	Three way match	8:06
4	Colt Cabana (c) defeated Tye Clodd	Singles match for the Jewish Heavyweight Championship	—
5	Brent Banks (with Bryce Hansen) defeated Tarik by pinfall	Singles match	9:17
6	Microman won by last eliminating Celine Jian	Reena Rumble match Matt Hardy served as the special guest enforcer.	—
7	Carlito defeated Richard Holliday by pinfall	Singles match	8:03
8	Gisele Shaw and Josh Alexander defeated Kris Chambers and Taylor Rising by pinfall	Mixed tag team match	11:50
9	Rohan Raja (with Aurora Teves) (c) defeated Rhino by pinfall	Singles match for the PWA Champions Grail	9:18
10	Mike Santana defeated Sheldon Jean (with Bryce Hansen) by pinfall	Singles match	17:42
(c) / – the champion(s) heading into the match; P / – the match was broadcast on the pre-show

== See also ==
- List of Maple Leaf Pro Wrestling events
