= Oceania Pro Wrestling =

Australian professional wrestling promotion

- Acronym: OPW
- Founded: 2023
- Style: Professional wrestling
- Headquarters: Melbourne, Victoria, Australia
- Owner: GLO Sports
- Website: oceaniaprowrestling.com

Oceania Pro Wrestling (OPW) is a professional wrestling promotion based in Melbourne, Victoria, Australia.

== History ==
From June 30, 2023 to July 2, 2023, OPW held its first events in collaboration with Impact Wrestling for the Down Under Tour which was streamed live on FITE TV and Australian Showcase which was aired on tape delay on Horizon. During those events, the first OPW Tag Team, Women's, and Heavyweight Champions were crowned with The Parea (Eli Theseus and Gabriel Aeros) being the first OPW Tag Team Champions, Erika Reid being crowned the first OPW Women's Champion, and Adam Brooks being crowned the first OPW Heavyweight Champion.

On January 16, 2024, OPW forged a working relationship with Major League Wrestling (MLW) which included talent and content creation partnerships.

From April 11, 2024 to April 14, 2024, OPW partnered with Starrcast to present a five-day fan convention tour in Australia. The convention also featured professional wrestling shows which included title defenses for the Stu Hart Heritage Championship and the TNA World Championship at Australian Stampede pay-per-view and a TNA Knockouts World Championship defense at the H.E.R. pay-per-view.

On August 19, 2024, OPW partnered with Maple Leaf Pro Wrestling (MLP) and Qatar Pro Wrestling (QPW) to form the Pro Wrestling Alliance (PWA) which allowed all three promotions to exchange talent and collaborate on various events.

== Championships ==
=== Current ===
| Championship | Current champion(s) | Reign | Date won | Days held | Days rec. | Location | Notes | Ref. |
|---|---|---|---|---|---|---|---|---|
| OPW Heavyweight Championship | Jesse Love | 1 | January 25, 2026 | 253+ | 253+ | Torquay, Victoria | Defeated Edward Dusk at WrestleWave | |
| OPW Tag Team Championship | Blacklisted (Fox and JXT) | 1 | January 10, 2026 | 268+ | 268+ | Altona Meadows, Victoria | defeated BadxBoujee (Carlo Cannon and Zhan Wen) to win the vacant championship at BaseBrawl | |
| OPW Women's Championship | Rochelle Rogue | 1 | September 27, 2026 | 8+ | 8+ | Torquay, Victoria | Defeated Tarlee at WrestleWave 2 | |
| OPW Women's Tag Team Championship | First Class Enterprise (Aysha and Melissa Averillo) | 1 | April 26, 2026 | 162+ | 162+ | Thornbury, Victoria | Defeated Billie Mac and Eugenie at MCW/OPW Sunday Showcase | |
| PWA Champions Grail | Stu Grayson | 1 | June 13, 2026 | 114+ | 54+ | Windsor, Ontario, Canada | Defeated Rohan Raja at MLP Mayhem | |
