= Global Wars Canada =

2026 professional wrestling event

- Promotional poster featuring various ROH and Maple Leaf Pro wrestlers
- Promotion(s): Ring of Honor (ROH); Maple Leaf Pro Wrestling (MLP)
- Date: March 27, 2026
- City: Windsor, Ontario, Canada
- Venue: St. Clair College Sportsplex

Pay-per-view chronology
← Previous; ROH: Final Battle; MLP: Reena Rumble	Next → ROH: Supercard of Honor; MLP: Uprising

ROH Global Wars chronology
← Previous; ROH x Metroplex	Next → ROH x CMLL x Stardom

Global Wars Canada was a professional wrestling pay-per-view (PPV) event co-promoted by Ring of Honor (ROH) and Maple Leaf Pro Wrestling (MLP). It was the 22nd Global Wars show and took place on March 27, 2026, at the St. Clair College Sportsplex in Windsor, Ontario, Canada. The show aired live on Triller TV, and was later made available to stream on demand via ROH's streaming service, Honor Club.

== Production ==
=== Background ===
Global Wars is a professional wrestling event held sporadically by the American promotion Ring of Honor (ROH) since 2012. Originally named "Border Wars" and co-produced with the Japanese promotion Pro Wrestling Noah, the event was renamed Global Wars in 2014 after ROH announced a partnership with New Japan Pro-Wrestling.

Under the new name, the event became a supershow and later a multi-day tour co-produced by the two promotions. In 2019, ROH announced a three-event tour with the Mexican promotion Consejo Mundial de Lucha Libre as the new partner for the series, renamed "Global Wars Espectacular". The Global Wars Espectacular tour marked the last Global Wars event held by ROH under the ownership of Sinclair Broadcast Group.

On January 16, 2026, ROH and MLP announced that they would present a joint Global Wars show at St. Clair College in Windsor, Ontario, Canada and that the show would air for the first time since 2017 on pay-per-view.

=== Storylines ===
Global Wars Canada featured multiple professional wrestling matches that involved different wrestlers from pre-existing scripted feuds and storylines. Storylines were produced on ROH's streaming program Ring of Honor Wrestling and Maple Leaf Pro Wrestling events.

== Results ==
No.	Results	Stipulations	Times
1^{D}	Maya World defeated Billie Starkz by pinfall	Singles match	7:11
2^{D}	El Reverso and Mo Jabari defeated Kris Chambers and Raj Singh by pinfall	Tag team match	6:39
3^{D}	Hyan defeated Aurora Teves by pinfall	Singles match	4:43
4	Eddie Kingston and Ortiz defeated Adam Priest and Tommy Billington by pinfall	Tag team match	8:46
5	Red Velvet (c) defeated Alice Crowley by pinfall	Singles match for the ROH Women's World Television Championship	8:22
6	The Lethal Twist (Jay Lethal, Lee Johnson, and Blake Christian) defeated Evil Uno, Bhupinder Gujjar, and Psycho Mike by pinfall	Six-man tag team match	12:32
7	Deonna Purrazzo (c) defeated Gisele Shaw by submission	Pure Wrestling Rules match for the ROH Women's Pure Championship; Jon Cruz, Jimmy Jacobs, and D-Lo Brown served as the judges.	14:08
8	Rohan Raja (c) (with Aurora Teves) defeated Stu Grayson by pinfall	Singles match for the PWA Champion's Grail	12:52
9	Michael Oku defeated Michael Allen Richard Clark, Jake Crist, Daisuke Sasaki, Brent Banks, and Ace Austin by pinfall	Six-way scramble	10:27
10	Athena (c) defeated Taylor Rising by submission	Singles match for the ROH Women’s World Championship	12:28
11	Ricochet defeated Rich Swann by pinfall	Singles match	19:52
12	The Good Brothers (Doc Gallows and Karl Anderson) defeated Kaito Kiyomiya and Bishop Dyer, GOA (Bishop Kaun and Toa Liona), and Bryce Hanson and Sheldon Jean by pinfall	Four-way tag team match to determine the inaugural MLP Canadian Tag Team Championship	12:37
(c) / – the champion(s) heading into the match; D / – this was a dark match
