= Impact Down Under Tour =

2023 professional wrestling event by Impact Wrestling

Down Under Tour
- Promotion(s): Impact Wrestling; Oceania Pro Wrestling
- Date: Night One: June 30, 2023; Night Two: July 1, 2023
- City: Wagga Wagga, New South Wales, Australia
- Venue: Equex Centre

Down Under Tour was a series of co-promotional professional wrestling events jointly produced by Impact Wrestling and Oceania Pro Wrestling (OPW). It was a four-day tour, which took place between June 29, 2023 and July 2, 2023. It featured two marquee events, which took place at the Equex Centre in Wagga Wagga, New South Wales, Australia on June 30, 2023 and July 1, 2023, which aired live via pay-per-view on FITE TV.

A total of 16 matches were contested, with eight matches on each show. In the main event on the first day, Alex Shelley defeated Steve Maclin to retain the Impact World Championship. In other prominent matches, Chris Sabin retained the X Division Championship against Frankie Kazarian and Robbie Eagles in a three-way match, and Joe Hendry retained the Digital Media Championship against Eddie Edwards. The second day was headlined by a Knockouts World Championship match between Deonna Purrazzo and Gisele Shaw, which Purrazzo won to retain the title. In other prominent matches at the event, ABC (Ace Austin and Chris Bey) defeated The Motor City Machine Guns (Alex Shelley and Chris Sabin) to retain the World Tag Team Championship, Joe Hendry defeated Moose to retain the Digital Media Championship, and Adam Brooks defeated Robbie Eagles to become the inaugural OPW Heavyweight Champion.

== Production ==
=== Background ===
In December 2022, New Japan Pro-Wrestling announced that it would host the first-ever Oceania Cup in Australia and it would be a four-day event, taking place in Wagga Wagga, New South Wales. However, NJPW was forced to postpone the event. On May 8, 2023, it was announced that NJPW's partner promotion Impact Wrestling would replace NJPW on the Australia tour, marking Impact's first-ever events to Australia, taking place between June 29, 2023 and July 2, 2023. The event was funded by the New South Wales government's Regional Events Acceleration Fund.

It was announced that Starrcast creator Conrad Thompson would host a live podcast during the tour titled "Business of Wrestling" with the Impact Wrestling President Scott D'Amore. Two major wrestling shows were announced to take place on June 30 and July 1, featuring wrestlers from Impact Wrestling and the upstart promotion Oceania Pro Wrestling. An eight-match Australian Showcase event was also announced to take place on the fourth day of the tour on July 2, which would feature wrestlers from Australia competing in front of D'Amore.

=== Storylines ===
The event featured several professional wrestling matches, which involved different wrestlers from pre-existing scripted feuds, plots, and storylines. Wrestlers portrayed heroes, villains, or less distinguishable characters in scripted events that built tension and culminated in a wrestling match or series of matches. Storylines were produced on Impact's weekly television program.

==== Main event matches ====
At Against All Odds, Alex Shelley defeated Steve Maclin to win the Impact World Championship. On June 15, it was announced that Maclin would receive his rematch against Shelley for the title on the first night of the Down Under Tour.

On June 15, it was announced that Deonna Purrazzo would defend the Knockouts World Championship against Gisele Shaw on July 1, and if Shaw won the title then the scheduled title match between Purrazzo and Trinity at Slammiversary would become a three-way match for the title between Shaw, Purrazzo and Trinity.

==== Undercard matches ====
On June 22, it was announced that Joe Hendry would defend the Digital Media Championship against Eddie Edwards on June 30, and the winner of the match would defend the title against Moose on July 1.

On June 22, it was announced that Chris Sabin would defend the X Division Championship against Frankie Kazarian and Robbie Eagles in a three-way match on June 30.

On June 22, it was announced that ABC (Ace Austin and Chris Bey) would defend the World Tag Team Championship against The Motor City Machine Guns (Alex Shelley and Chris Sabin).

On the June 22 episode of Impact!, Bully Ray and Steve Maclin defeated Eddie Edwards and Frankie Kazarian in a tag team match. This led to a match being announced between Kazarian and Maclin to take place on July 1 during the Down Under tour.

== Results ==
=== Down Under Tour ===
Night 1 (June 30)
No.	Results	Stipulations	Times
1	Slex defeated Adam Brooks by pinfall	Singles match	6:19
2	Gisele Shaw defeated Erika Reid by submission	Singles match	7:33
3	Joe Hendry (c) defeated Eddie Edwards by pinfall	Singles match for the Impact Digital Media Championship	11:41
4	Killer Kelly defeated Aysha by submission	Singles match	7:09
5	Chris Sabin (c) defeated Frankie Kazarian and Robbie Eagles by pinfall	Three-way match for the Impact X Division Championship	14:49
6	ABC (Ace Austin and Chris Bey) defeated The Most Professional Wrestling Gods (Brian Myers and Moose) by pinfall	Tag team match	15:57
7	Deonna Purrazzo defeated Steph De Lander by submission	Singles match	9:07
8	Alex Shelley (c) defeated Steve Maclin by pinfall	Singles match for the Impact World Championship	21:06
(c) / – the champion(s) heading into the match

Night 2 (July 1)
No.	Results	Stipulations	Times
1	Adam Brooks defeated Robbie Eagles by pinfall	Singles match to crown the inaugural OPW Heavyweight Champion	13:02
2	The Natural Classics (Stevie Filip and Tome Filip) defeated The VeloCities (Jude London and Paris De Silva) by pinfall	Tag team match	4:46
3	Joe Hendry (c) defeated Moose by pinfall	Singles match for the Impact Digital Media Championship	12:16
4	Eddie Edwards defeated Slex by pinfall	Singles match	11:49
5	Steph De Lander defeated Killer Kelly by pinfall	Singles match	9:51
6	Frankie Kazarian defeated Brian Myers by submission	Singles match	14:47
7	ABC (Ace Austin and Chris Bey) (c) defeated The Motor City Machine Guns (Alex Shelley and Chris Sabin) by pinfall	Tag team match for the Impact World Tag Team Championship	19:03
8	Deonna Purrazzo (c) defeated Gisele Shaw by submission	Singles match for the Impact Knockouts World Championship	17:04
(c) / – the champion(s) heading into the match

=== Australian Showcase ===
Australian Showcase
- Promotion(s): Impact Wrestling; Oceania Pro Wrestling
- Date: July 2, 2023
- City: Wagga Wagga, New South Wales, Australia
- Venue: Equex Centre

No.	Results	Stipulations
1	Jimmy Townsend defeated Ricky South	Singles match
2	Erika Reid defeated Xena	Singles match to crown the inaugural OPW Women's Champion
3	Matt Hayter defeated Luke Watts	Singles match
4	Kingsley defeated Lena Kross	Singles match
5	The Parea (Eli Theseus and Gabriel Aeros) defeated Top Tier (Mitch Ryder and Tim Hayden)	Tag team match to crown the inaugural OPW Tag Team Champions
6	Anth Cava defeated Syd Parker	Singles match
7	Aysha defeated Frankie B	Singles match
8	Mick Moretti defeated Jack Bonza	Singles match
