= Josh Alexander =

Canadian professional wrestler (born 1987)

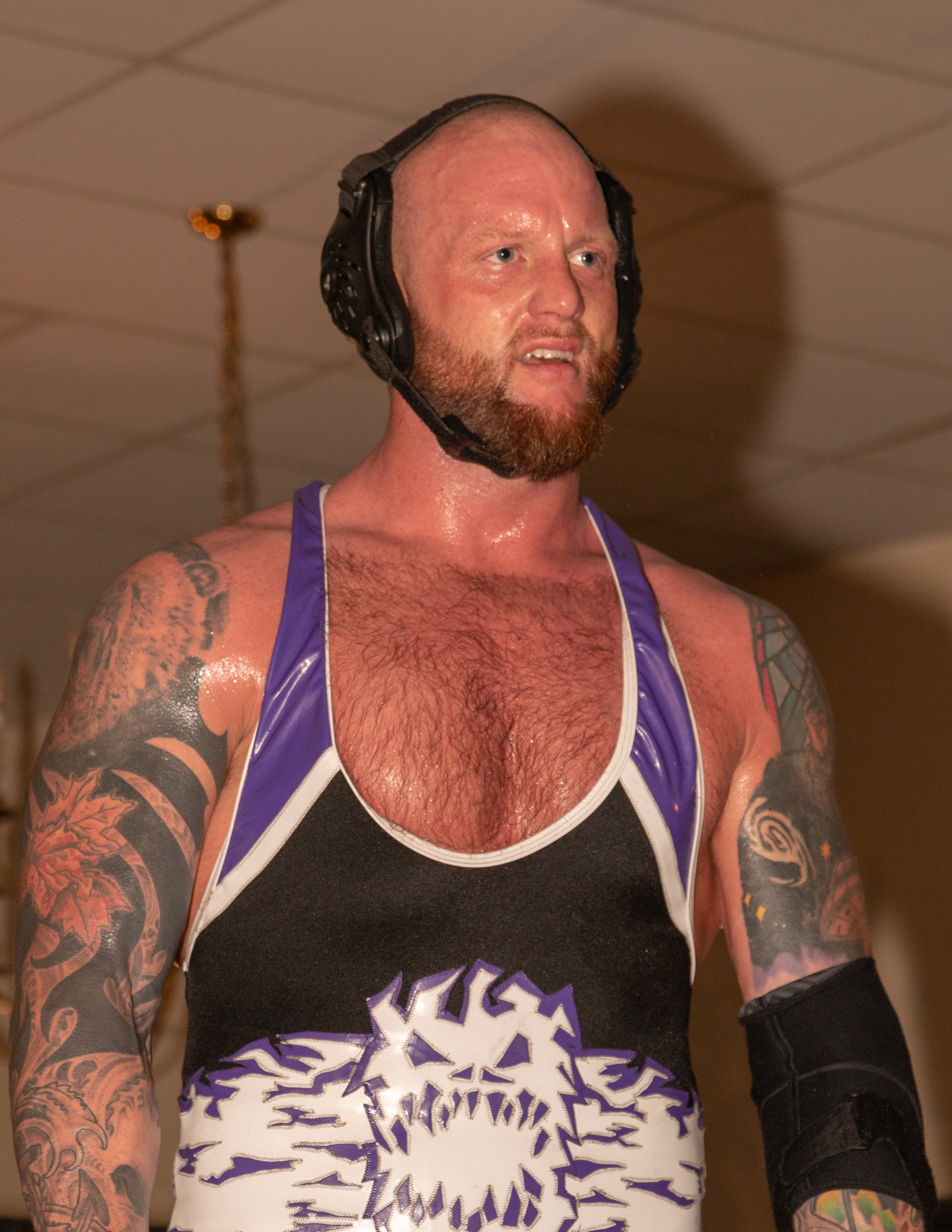
- Alexander in 2018

Personal information
- Born: Joshua Lemay; May 29, 1987 (age 39), Bolton, Ontario, Canada
- Spouse: Jade Chung (m. 2016)
- Children: 2

Professional wrestling career
- Ring name(s): Jay Fenix; Josh Alexander; Tim Burr
- Billed height: 6 ft 1 in (1.85 m)
- Billed weight: 228 lb (103 kg)
- Billed from: Toronto, Ontario, Canada
- Trained by: Johnny Devine
- Debut: 2005

Joshua Lemay (born May 29, 1987), better known by his ring name Josh Alexander, is a Canadian professional wrestler. He is signed to All Elite Wrestling (AEW), where he is a member of the Don Callis Family. Additionally, he makes appearances for Maple Leaf Pro Wrestling (MLP), where he is the inaugural and current MLP Canadian Champion, and serves as the head coach of the MLP Academy. He is also known for his time in Total Nonstop Action Wrestling (TNA).

In 2005, Alexander made his professional wrestling debut on the Canadian independent scene, where he met Ethan Page and would form a tag team with him known as The North (formerly Monster Mafia). The duo would perform for various promotions, including AAW Wrestling and Pro Wrestling Guerrilla (PWG), winning tag championships in both promotions. In 2019, Alexander signed with TNA and would go on to win the TNA World Tag Team Championship twice with Page, with their first reign becoming the longest in the title's history at 380 days. After Page departed TNA, Alexander switched to singles competition and became a one-time TNA X Division Champion and a two-time TNA World Champion, with his second reign being the longest in the company's history at 335 days. In February 2025, Alexander would leave TNA and sign with AEW that April.

== Professional wrestling career ==
=== Independent circuit (2005–2024) ===
Josh Alexander was trained to wrestle by Johnny Devine. He debuted in 2005. He then started his career on the regional Canadian independent circuit. He met fellow wrestler Ethan Page in the Alpha-1 promotion in Ontario in 2010, where the two became close friends. A year later, they formed the tag team Monster Mafia where they wrestled for various promotions including Ring of Honor (ROH) and AAW Wrestling. In 2013 he suffered a neck injury during an AAW match. After taking time off to heal, he returned to action. A few months after, he reinjured his neck during a ROH tryout match with ReDRagon. He had herniated a disk so he would have his C5–C6 vertebrae fused to fix the injury. However, he did not take time off during this time and kept the injury a secret, not wanting to squander the opportunity to work with ROH.

In February 2015, Monster Mafia debuted for Pro Wrestling Guerilla (PWG), facing The Young Bucks in their first match. He injured his neck again in a match with Matt Sydal and Chris Sabin. Alexander again worked through it, with he and Page participating in the annual Dynamite Duumvirate Tag Team Title Tournament in May. They won the PWG World Tag Team Championship in the first round match with Joey Ryan and Candice LeRae. The reign was short-lived, as they lost it later that night. Alexander had neck surgery in July 2015, and he retired from wrestling.

Less than a year later in April 2016, Alexander returned to wrestling, defeating Seleziya Sparx to win the A1 Alpha Male Title upon his return. Initially still aligned with Ethan Page upon his return in Alpha-1, eventually he and Page went their separate ways. He would wrestle for Absolute Intense Wrestling (AIW), Progress Wrestling, and Beyond Wrestling, among other promotions.

On November 17, 2024, Alexander announced that he would no longer be taking independent bookings.

=== Impact Wrestling/Total Nonstop Action Wrestling (2019–2025) ===
==== The North (2019–2021) ====
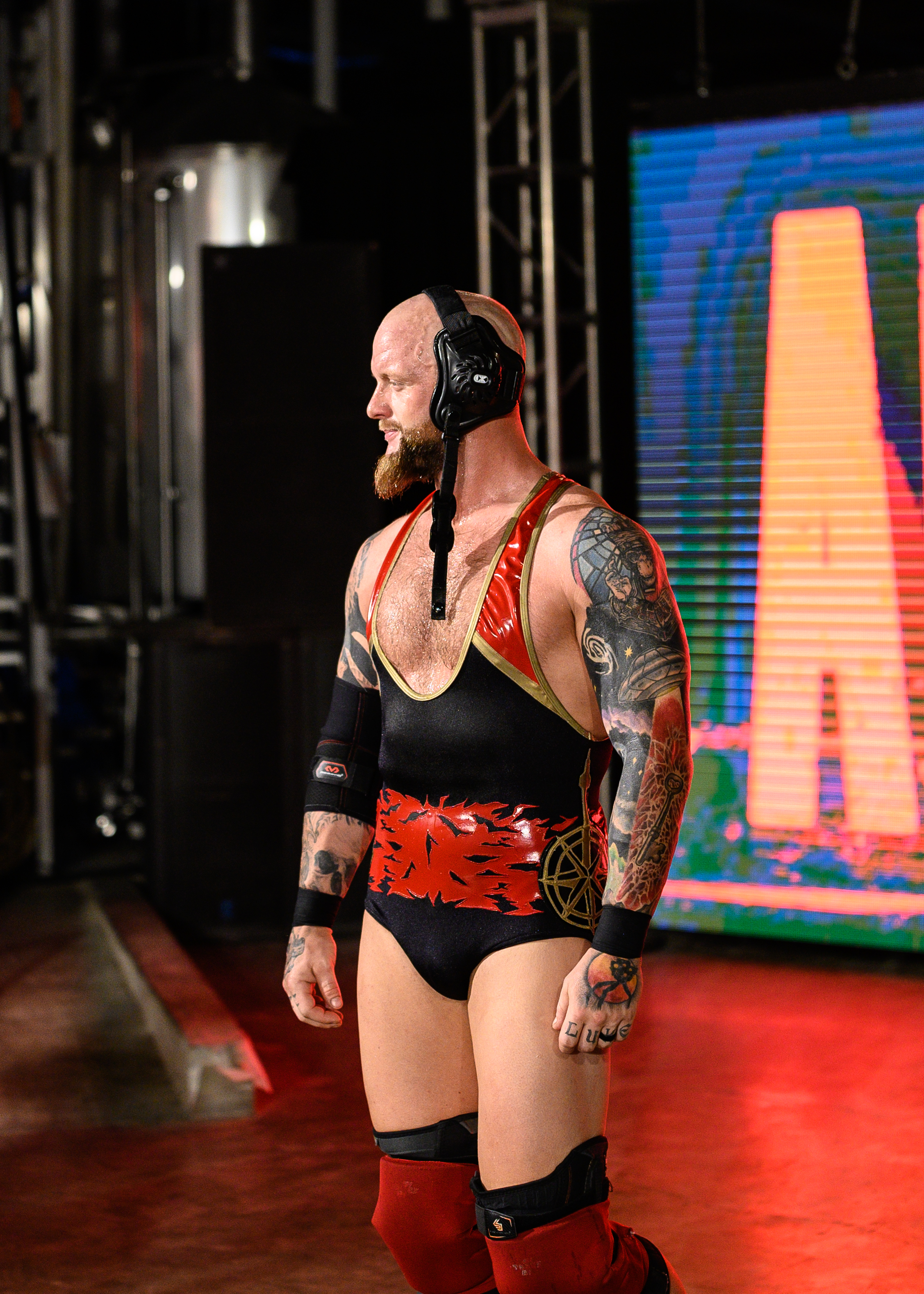
In 2019, Alexander signed a contract with Impact Wrestling.

Alexander began appearing in Impact Wrestling in 2018 by making appearances on Xplosion as an enhancement talent against the likes of Killer Kross and Matt Sydal. In February 2019, Alexander signed a three-year contract with the promotion. Impact Wrestling subsequently hyped Alexander's debut with an online documentary made by Toronto-based filmmaker Glen Matthews. Alexander reformed with Ethan Page under the name The North, as they defeated El Reverso and Sheldon Jean on the April 12 episode of Impact! while subsequently establishing himself as a heel. The North teamed up with Moose to defeat The Rascalz in a six-man tag team match at Rebellion, marking Alexander's pay-per-view debut in Impact.

On the June 14 episode of Impact!, North defeated Rob Van Dam and Sabu to earn a title shot against The Latin American Xchange (Santana and Ortiz) for the World Tag Team Championship at the Bash at the Brewery event on July 5. North defeated LAX at the event to win the titles for the first time. North retained the titles against LAX and The Rascalz in a three-way match at Slammiversary in their first title defense. North went on to retain the titles throughout the rest of the year against Reno Scum and the team of Rich Swann and Willie Mack at Unbreakable, the team of Swann and Mack and the team of Rob Van Dam and Rhino at Bound for Glory and Swann and Mack at Turning Point. They became the longest-reigning World Tag Team Champions as they retained the titles in 2020 against Willie Mack in a handicap match at Hard To Kill, The Rascalz at Sacrifice and the team of Ken Shamrock and Sami Callihan at Slammiversary until they lost it against The Motor City Machine Guns on the July 21 episode of Impact!.

The North unsuccessfully challenged Motor City Machine Guns in a rematch for the World Tag Team Championship at Emergence but regained the titles at Bound for Glory, before losing it a few weeks later to The Good Brothers at Turning Point. Then, Alexander and Page started a storyline where they did not work well together, leading to Page's departure from Impact.

==== X Division Champion (2021–2022) ====
Following the departure of Ethan Page, Alexander returned to singles competition. He faced Brian Myers at the Hard To Kill pre-show in a losing effort, turning face in the process. On the January 19 episode of Impact!, Alexander cemented his face turn when he confronted Ace Austin backstage. He was subsequently assaulted by Austin and Madman Fulton until new signee Matt Cardona came to even the odds. This culminated in a tag team match the following week, where Alexander and Cardona emerged victorious.

At No Surrender, Alexander won a Triple Threat Revolver match to be the number one contender to the Impact X Division Championship, where he lost against TJP on the February 16 episode of Impact!. At Rebellion, he defeated Ace Austin and TJP to win the X Division Championship for the first time. On the April 29 episode of Impact!, Alexander made his first successful title defense against Austin. At Under Siege on May 15, he had another successful title defense against New Japan Pro-Wrestling (NJPW) talent El Phantasmo. On June 3, Alexander defended the title against TJP in Impact's first-ever 60-minute Iron man match, winning 2–1 in sudden death overtime. At Slammiversary on July 17, Alexander successfully retained his X Division Championship in an Ultimate X match against Austin, Chris Bey, Petey Williams, Rohit Raju, and Trey Miguel. Alexander then retained his title against Black Taurus at Homecoming, against Jake Something at Emergence, and against Chris Sabin at Victory Road.

Later that night at Victory Road, Alexander confronted Impact World Champion Christian Cage (who had retained his title moments before against Ace Austin), invoking Option C to relinquish his X Division Championship for a World Championship match in the main event of Bound for Glory. At Bound for Glory on October 23, Alexander defeated Cage to win the Impact World Championship. However, while celebrating with his family, he lost the title to Moose, who cashed in his Call Your Shot Gauntlet trophy. At Turning Point, Alexander called out Moose but was instead attacked by the debuting Jonah. At Hard To Kill, Alexander defeated Jonah. On February 14, 2022, Alexander announced that his contract with Impact Wrestling and US work visa had expired; an angle was done to write him off television during the February 10 episode of Impact, where Impact president Scott D'Amore "sent him home".

==== Longest-reigning Impact World Champion (2022–2023) ====
At Sacrifice on March 5, Alexander made his return, attacking Impact World Champion Moose after his match against Heath. Alexander revealed that he signed a new multi-year contract with Impact Wrestling, while also challenging Moose for the Impact World Championship in the main event of Rebellion. At Rebellion, Alexander defeated Moose in the main event to capture the Impact World Championship for a second time. At Under Siege on May 7, Alexander made his first successful title defense against NJPW talent Tomohiro Ishii. At Slammiversary on June 19, he had another successful title defense against Eric Young. He successfully defended his world title against Joe Doering at Against All Odds, ending Doering's undefeated streak in Impact Wrestling.

On July 31, at Ric Flair's Last Match event, Alexander defended the title against Major League Wrestling (MLW) talent Jacob Fatu, but it ended in a no contest due to interference from Brian Myers, Matt Cardona and Mark Sterling. On August 12, at Emergence, Alexander successfully defended the world title against Alex Shelley. On September 23, at Victory Road, he teamed with Heath and Rich Swann to face Honor No More (Eddie Edwards, Matt Taven, and Mike Bennett) in a six-man tag team match, suffering his first pinfall loss in nearly a year. At Bound for Glory, Alexander made another successful title defense against Edwards, before being confronted by Call Your Shot Gauntlet winner Bully Ray. On November 18, at Over Drive, Alexander retained his title against Frankie Kazarian. On the December 8 episode of Impact!, Alexander fought Mike Bailey for nearly an hour to successfully defend his title, garnering positive reviews from critics.

Alexander was a traveling champion, defending the title outside of Impact and internationally against opponents like Jacob Fatu (at Ric Flair's Last Match), Kez Evans, Kevin Blackwood and MLW World Heavyweight Champion Alexander Hammerstone (in a title-for-title match).

On January 4, 2023, Alexander surpassed Bobby Roode's reign of 256 days, thus becoming the longest-reigning Impact World Champion. Nine days later, at Hard To Kill, Alexander defeated Call Your Shot Gauntlet winner Bully Ray in a Full Metal Mayhem match to retain the title. On February 24, at No Surrender, Alexander defeated Rich Swann to retain the title. He would make another successful title defense against NJPW talent KENTA on the March 30 tapings of Impact!. On March 24, it was announced that Alexander has relinquished the title due to him suffering a triceps tear, ending his second and record-setting reign at 335 days, with the segment airing on the April 9 tapings of Impact!.

Alexander made his return from injury at Slammiversary, confronting Impact World Champion Alex Shelley. He had his first match since injury at Multiverse United 2, where he teamed up with the DKC, El Phantasmo, PCO, and Guerillas of Destiny (Tama Tonga and Tanga Loa) in a 12-Man tag-team match. He returned to action at Emergence, teaming up with Time Machine (Chris Sabin, Alex Shelley and Kushida) in an eight-man tag team match against Brian Myers, Lio Rush, Bully Ray, and Moose, which they lost when Steve Maclin, who also made his return from injury, interfered in the match by attacking Alexander. This sparked a brief feud between Alexander and Maclin that culminated at Victory Road, where Alexander defeated Maclin. Following the win, he began feuding with Alex Shelley in an attempt to regain the Impact World Championship. Alexander unsuccessfully challenged Shelley for the title at Bound for Glory. On the November 16 episode of Impact!, Alexander was defeated by Will Ospreay.

==== The Northern Armory (2024–2025) ====
On January 13, 2024, at Hard To Kill, Alexander defeated Alex Hammerstone in the latter's debut match. On the January 18 edition of Impact!, Alexander defeated Will Ospreay in a rematch of their previous encounter in October. The match received a 5.5 star rating from Dave Meltzer, making it the first five star match in Alexander's career. On February 20, it was announced that TNA Wrestling has extended Alexander's contact with the company. On February 23 at No Surrender, Alexander defeated Simon Gotch. On March 8 at Sacrifice, Alexander was defeated by Hammerstone in a Hard To Kill rematch. On April 20 at Rebellion, Alexander defeated Hammerstone in their third match, which was a Last Man Standing match to end the rivalry. On May 3 at Under Siege, Alexander and Eric Young defeated Steve Maclin and Frankie Kazarian. At Slammiversary, Alexander competed in a 6-man elimination match, for the TNA World Championship that included Joe Hendry, Steve Maclin, Nic Nemeth, Frankie Kazarian, and reigning champion, Moose. During the match, Alexander low blowed Hendry and eliminated him, turning heel for the first time since 2021. Alexander would later be eliminated by eventual winner, Nic Nemeth. This led to a rivalry between Alexander and Hendry. After failing to win the TNA World Championship from Nic Nemeth in an Iron Man match at Emergence, Alexander lost to Hendry via submission at Victory Road.

On the October 10 episode of Impact!, Alexander formed a new stable known as The Northern Armory, with fellow stablemates Judas Icarus and Travis Williams and would begin a feud with Steve Maclin and Eric Young. On October 26, at Bound for Glory, Alexander would defeat Steve Maclin. At Turning Point, Alexander would lose to Maclin in a no disqualification match. On December 13, at Final Resolution, Josh competed in a four-way match to determine the number one contender to the TNA World Championship that included Joe Hendry, Steve Maclin and Mike Santana, in a losing effort.

On January 19, 2025, at Genesis, Alexander was defeated by Mike Santana in an "I Quit" match. After the match, both Alexander and Santana shook hands and Alexander subsequently announced that he was quitting TNA. On the January 25 episode of Impact!, Icarus and Williams would turn on their own leader by kicking him out of the group and subsequently beating him down until Eric Young came to even the odds, turning Alexander face once again. On the February 1 episode of Impact, Alexander and Young faced off against Icarus and Williams in a tag team match, which they lost as Young would turn on Alexander, siding with Icarus and Williams. On the February 13 episode of Impact!, Alexander was defeated by Young in what would be his last match in TNA. Alexander later officially announced his departure from TNA, ending his six-year tenure with the promotion.

=== New Japan Pro-Wrestling (2021–2023) ===
Alexander made his debut for New Japan Pro-Wrestling on the June 18, 2021, episode of NJPW Strong and defeated Alex Coughlin. On the April 9, 2022 episode of Strong, Alexander defeated Karl Fredericks. On April 16 at Windy City Riot, Alexander teamed with Fred Rosser, Alex Coughlin, Ren Narita and Chris Dickinson defeated Team Filthy (Royce Isaacs, Jorel Nelson, JR Kratos, Black Tiger and Danny Limelight).

On February 18, 2023, at Battle in the Valley, Alexander teamed with Máscara Dorada, Adrian Quest and Rocky Romero for an eight-man tag team match against Kushida, Volador Jr., Kevin Knight and The DKC in a losing effort. At Destruction In Ryōgoku, Alexander and the Motor City Machine Guns (Alex Shelley and Chris Sabin) unsuccessfully challenged Kazuchika Okada, Hiroshi Tanahashi, and Tomohiro Ishii for the NEVER Openweight 6-Man Tag Team Championship.

=== Maple Leaf Pro Wrestling (2024–present) ===
On October 19, 2024, Alexander made his debut for Maple Leaf Pro Wrestling (MLP) on Night 1 of their inaugural event Forged in Excellence, teaming with El Phantasmo and Stu Grayson to defeat Trevor Lee, Rocky Romero and Alex Zayne at six-man tag team match. On October 20 at Night 2 of the event, Alexander unsuccessfully challenged Konosuke Takeshita for the AEW International Championship.

On March 15, 2025, Alexander returns at Mayhem, where he saves Kevin Knight and Kushida from an attack of Blake Christian, Q. T. Marshall and Sheldon Jean. On May 10, at Northern Rising, Alexander defeated Q. T. Marshall. Later in the show, Alexander competed in and won a 20-man Gauntlet For The Gold to become the inaugural MLP Canadian Champion. On July 5 at Resurrection, Alexander successfully defended his title against Ace Austin in his first title defense. On September 5 at Sacred Ground, Alexander successfully defended his title against TJP On October 27 at Reena Rumble, Alexander teaming with Gisele Shaw defeated Kris Chambers and Taylor Rising in mixed tag team match. On March 27, 2026, Alexander announced that he would be undergoing knee surgery and would unable to be defend his title for an indefinite amount of time. As of result, an interim champion was crowned the next day at Uprising. Alexander returned on the August 19 episode of MLP Mayhem and challenged interim champion Stu Grayson to a title unification match at Northern Rising on October 3. On September 4, Alexander was announced as the head coach of the newly launched MLP Academy. On September 11, at MLP Sacred Ground, he successfully defended his title against Jonny DeLuca. At Northern Rising, Alexander defeated Stu Grayson to become the Undisputed MLP Canadian Champion.

=== All Elite Wrestling (2025–present) ===
On April 16, 2025, Alexander made his All Elite Wrestling (AEW) debut at the Spring BreakThru special edition of Dynamite, being revealed as the wildcard participant in the men's bracket of the Owen Hart Cup against "Hangman" Adam Page, in which he lost. After the match, Alexander attacked Page under the orders of Don Callis, joining the Don Callis Family and establishing himself as a heel. On May 25 at Double or Nothing, Alexander teamed with stablemates Konosuke Takeshita and Kyle Fletcher to defeat Paragon (Adam Cole, Kyle O'Reilly, and Roderick Strong). Over the following months, Alexander would challenge for the AEW TNT Championship and AEW World Tag Team Championship, as well as competing at All In on July 12 in the Casino Gauntlet match. At Full Gear on November 22, Alexander teamed with The Young Bucks (Matt Jackson and Nick Jackson) to defeat Kenny Omega and Jurassic Express ("Jungle" Jack Perry and Luchasaurus) in a $1,000,000 Trios match.

On March 27, 2026, Alexander announced that he would be undergoing knee surgery and would be out indefinitely after suffering an injury during a match on Collision a week prior. Alexander returned on the September 2 episode of Dynamite, attacking Darby Allin and Steven Borden.

=== Consejo Mundial de Lucha Libre (2025–present) ===
Alexander made his Consejo Mundial de Lucha Libre (CMLL) debut on the June 17, 2025 episode of Martes de Arena Mexico event, where he was defeated by Atlantis Jr.. On the February 20, 2026 episode of Viernes Espectacular, Alexander successfully defended his MLP Canadian Championship against Esfinge.

== Personal life ==
Lemay has been married to fellow professional wrestler Jade Chung since 2016. Together they have two sons. In addition to his wrestling career, Lemay worked as a construction insulator until September 1, 2021.

Lemay revealed on Twitter in May 2021 that he wears amateur wrestling–styled headgear after injuring his left ear in 2013. At an Absolute Intense Wrestling show in Cleveland, he was hit in the ear severely enough that it "blew up off my head". The following day he was hit again in the ear where the "ear split in half, and it was like dangling down" requiring temporary amputation of his left ear to remove scar tissue. He bought a set of headgear in order to protect his ear at a match two weeks following, and was advised by Ethan Page to continue to wear the gear as "You look like a badass with it."

== Championships and accomplishments ==
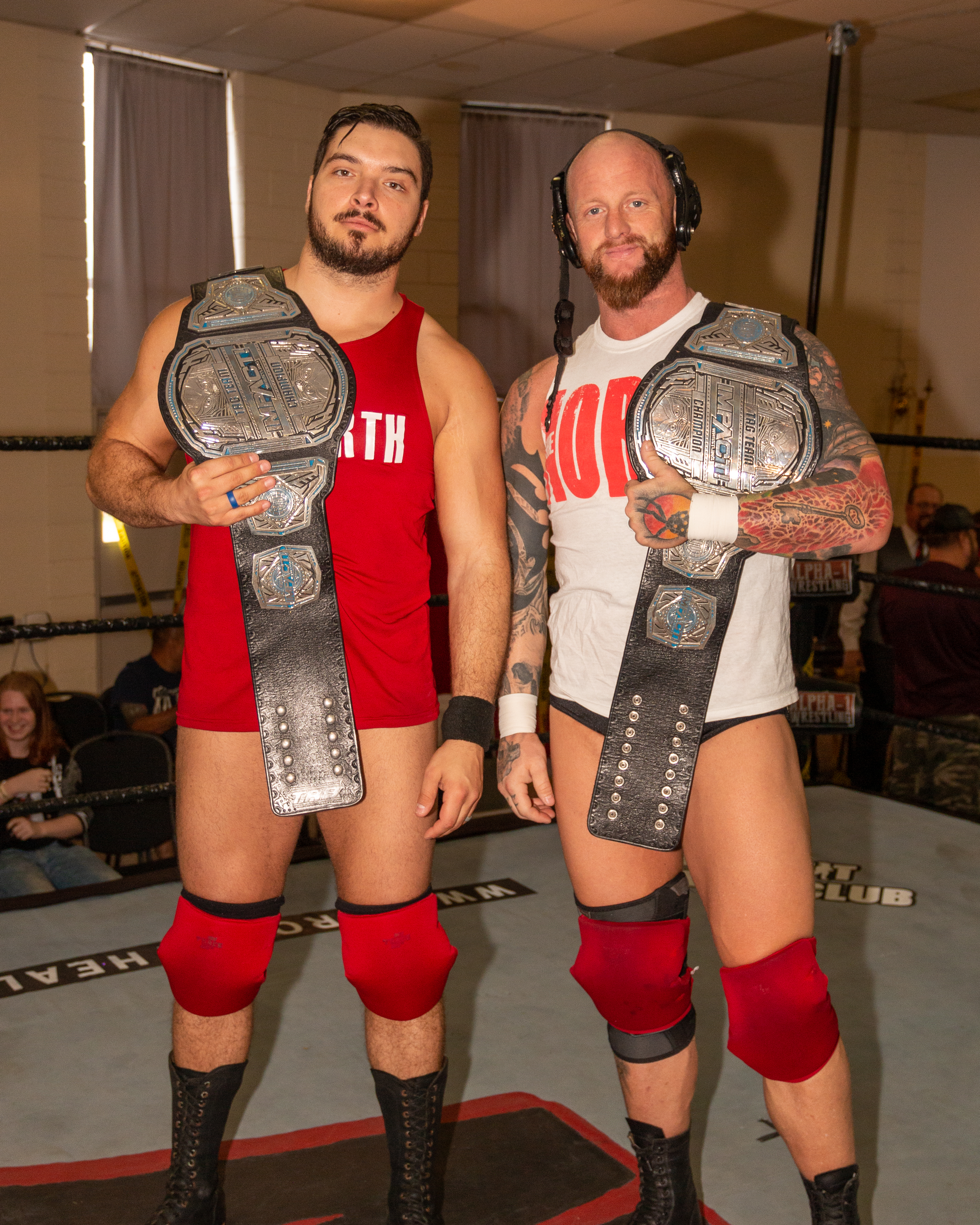
Alexander is a two-time Impact World Tag Team Champion with Ethan Page as The North.

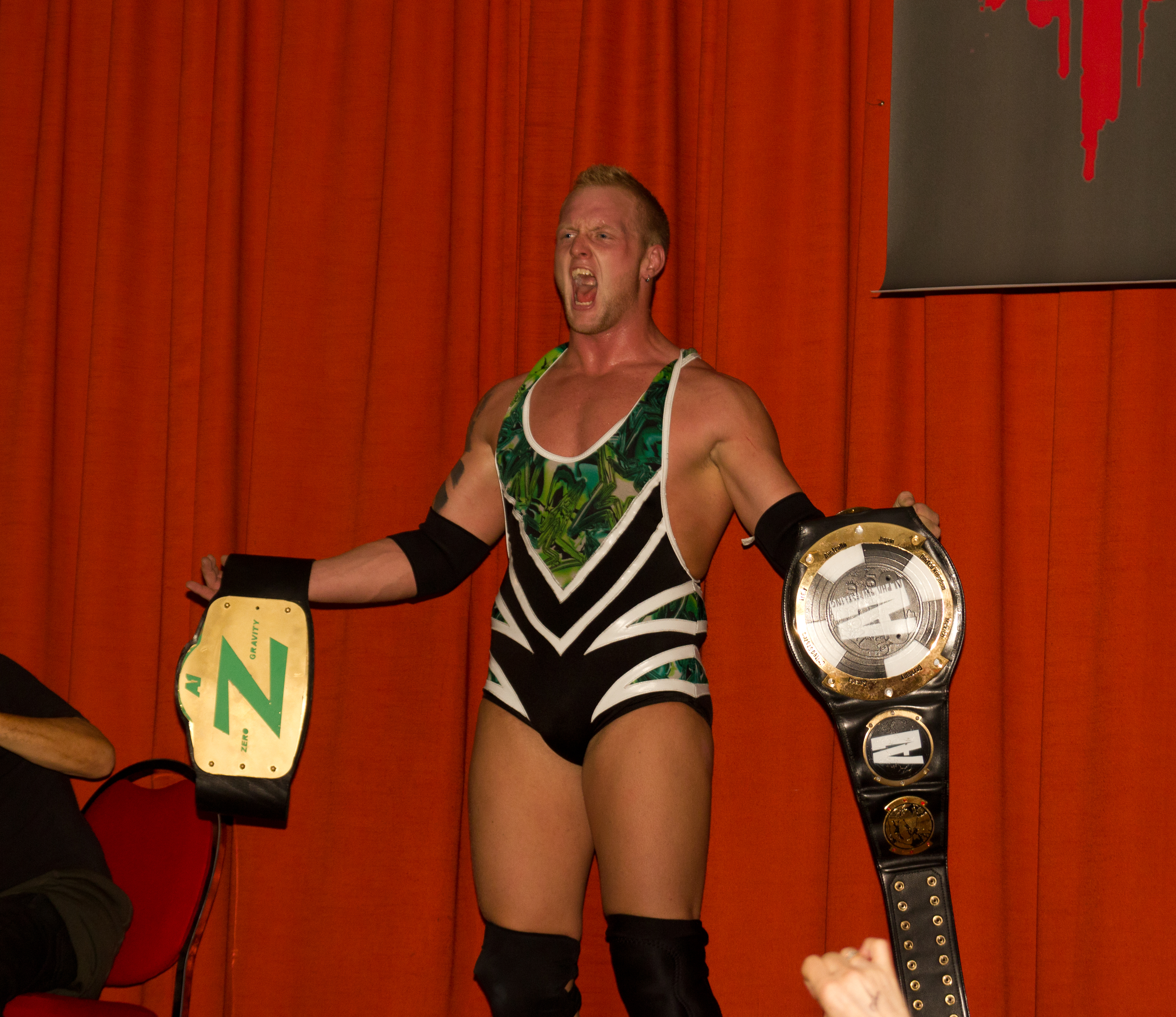
Alexander is a four-time A1 Alpha Male Championship (left) and one-time A1 Zero Gravity Championship (right).

- AAW Wrestling
  - AAW Heavyweight Championship (2 times)
  - Jim Lynam Memorial Tournament (2019)
- Absolute Intense Wrestling
  - AIW Absolute Championship (1 time)
  - JT Lightning Invitational Tournament (2016)
- Alpha-1 Wrestling
  - A1 Alpha Male Championship (4 times)
  - A1 Zero Gravity Championship (1 time)
  - A1 Tag Team Championship (2 times) – with Tyson Dux and Gavin Quinn (1) and Ethan Page (1)
  - King Of Hearts (2018)
- Capital City Championship Combat
  - C4 Championship (1 time)
  - C4 Tag Team Championship (1 time) – with Rahim Ali
- Collective League Of Adrenaline Strength And Honor
  - CLASH Championship (1 time)
- Cross Body Pro Wrestling Academy
  - CBPW Championship (2 times)
- Deathproof Fight Club
  - DFC Championship (1 time)
- Destiny World Wrestling
  - DWW Championship (1 time)
  - DWW Interim Championship (1 time)
- Fringe Pro Wrestling
  - FPW Tag Team Championship (1 time) – with Ethan Page
- Great Canadian Wrestling
  - GCW Tag Team Championship (1 time) – with Tyler Tirva
- Impact Wrestling/Total Nonstop Action Wrestling
  - TNA World Championship (2 times)
  - TNA X Division Championship (1 time)
  - TNA World Tag Team Championship (2 times) – with Ethan Page
  - Ninth Triple Crown Champion
  - Impact Year End Awards (7 times)
    - Tag Team of the Year (2019, 2020) – with Ethan Page
    - Male Wrestler of the Year (2021, 2022)
    - Men's Match of the Year (2021) vs. TJP on June 3 at BTI
    - Match of the Year (2022) vs. Mike Bailey on Impact! on December 8
    - Moment of the Year (2022) – Defeating Moose to win the Impact World Championship at Rebellion
- Insane Wrestling League
  - IWL Tag Team Championship (1 time) – with Ethan Page
- International Wrestling Cartel
  - IWC Super Indy Championship (2 times)
  - IWC Tag Team Championship (1 time) – with Ethan Page
  - Super Indy 15
- Maple Leaf Pro Wrestling
  - MLP Canadian Championship (2 times, current, inaugural)
- New School Wrestling
  - NSW Heavyweight Championship (2 time)
  - NSW Cruiserweight Championship (1 time)
  - NSW Tag Team Championship (1 time) – with Steve Brown
- No Limits Wrestling
  - NLW Strong Style Championship (1 time)
  - Steel City Strong Style Tournament (2018)
- Pro Wrestling Guerrilla
  - PWG World Tag Team Championship (1 time) – with Ethan Page
- Pro Wrestling Illustrated
  - Faction of the Year (2025) as part of the Don Callis Family
  - Ranked No. 9 of the top 500 singles wrestlers in the PWI 500 in 2023
- Pro Wrestling Ontario
  - PWO Trios Championship (1 time) – with Scotty O'Shea and Steve Brown
- Pure Wrestling Association
  - PWA Elite Championship (1 time)
  - PWA Pure Violence Championship (1 time)
  - PWA Niagara Tag Team Championship (1 time) – with Reese Runnels
- Sports Illustrated
  - Ranked No. 9 of the top 10 wrestlers in 2021
- Squared Circle Wrestling
  - SCW Premier Championship (2 times)
- The Wrestling Revolver
  - Revolver Tag Team Championship (1 time) – with Ethan Page
- Union Of Independent Professional Wrestlers
  - UNION Heavyweight Championship (1 time)
- Unlimited Wrestling
  - Unlimited Wrestling Championship (1 time)
