= Alofa =

Scientific classification
- Domain: Eukaryota
- Kingdom: Animalia
- Phylum: Arthropoda
- Class: Insecta
- Order: Hemiptera
- Suborder: Heteroptera
- Family: Anthocoridae
- Subfamily: Anthocorinae
- Tribe: Dufouriellini
- Genus: Alofa; Herring, 1976

Genus of insects

Alofa is a genus of flower bugs in the tribe Cardiastethini, erected by JL Herring in 1976.
