= MLP Forged in Excellence =

2024 Maple Leaf Pro Wrestling event

Forged in Excellence
- Promotional poster of the event
- Promotion: Maple Leaf Pro Wrestling
- Date: October 19–20, 2024
- City: Windsor, Ontario, Canada
- Venue: St. Clair College Sportsplex

Pay-per-view chronology
← Previous; First	Next → Mayhem

Forged In Excellence was a professional wrestling pay-per-view event and the inaugural event produced by the revived promotion Maple Leaf Pro Wrestling.

The event took place at the St. Clair College Sportsplex in Windsor, Ontario and was streamed live on Triller TV. It featured wrestlers from Maple Leaf Pro's sister promotion Border City Wrestling and various promotions around the world such as All Elite Wrestling and its sister promotion Ring of Honor, Total Nonstop Action Wrestling, Qatar Pro Wrestling, and New Japan Pro Wrestling.

== Production ==
=== Background ===
On April 14, 2024, Michael E. Dockins filed a trademark for "Maple Leaf Wrestling". The address listed on the filing was for Border City Wrestling (BCW), owned by former Total Nonstop Action Wrestling (TNA) president Scott D’Amore.

On August 8, D’Amore announced a relaunch of the Maple Leaf Wrestling brand dubbed Maple Leaf Pro Wrestling (MLP). Its inaugural two-night event, "Forged in Excellence", which was scheduled to take place on October 19 and 20 at St. Clair College in Windsor, Ontario, Canada, and would be streamed live on Triller TV.

On August 19, 2024, Maple Leaf Pro Wrestling (MLP), Oceania Pro Wrestling (OPW), and Qatar Pro Wrestling (QPW) formed the Pro Wrestling Alliance (PWA) to work together on talent exchange and other collaborations.

=== Storylines ===
Forged in Excellence featured multiple professional wrestling matches that involved different wrestlers from pre-existing scripted feuds and storylines. Storylines were produced on various Border City Wrestling and Maple Leaf Pro Wrestling events.

== Results ==
Night 1 - October 19, 2024
No.	Results	Stipulations	Times
1^{D}	Psycho Mike defeated Raj Singh by pinfall	Singles match	—
2^{D}	Classy Ali defeated Bryce Hansen by pinfall	Singles match	—
3	Josh Alexander, Stu Grayson and El Phantasmo defeated Trevor Lee, Rocky Romero and Alex Zayne by pinfall	Six-man tag team match	13:31
4	Q. T. Marshall (with Harley Cameron) defeated Bhupinder Gujjar by pinfall	Singles match	8:24
5	Kylie Rae defeated Laynie Luck, Aurora Teves and Taylor Rising by pinfall	Four-way match	6:53
6	Intergalactic Jet Setters (Kevin Knight and Kushida) (c) defeated Brent Banks and Johnny Swinger and Aiden Prince and El Reverso and Rogue Squadron (Rohit Raju and Sheldon Jean) by pinfall	Four-way tag team match for the IWGP Junior Heavyweight Tag Team Championship	16:10
7	Rohan Raja defeated Jake Something by pinfall	Singles match for the inaugural PWA Champions Grail	13:30
8	Bully Ray defeated Raj Dhesi by "elimination"	Tables match	8:53
9	Gisele Shaw defeated Miyu Yamashita by pinfall	Singles match Had Yamashita won, she would’ve challenged Athena for the ROH Women's World Championship alongside Shaw in a three-way match on Night 2.	12:36
10	Konosuke Takeshita (with Don Callis) defeated Mike Bailey by pinfall	Singles match Had Bailey won, he would’ve received a future shot at the AEW International Championship.	24:39
(c) / – the champion(s) heading into the match; D / – this was a dark match

Night 2 - October 20, 2024
No.	Results	Stipulations	Times
1^{D}	Brent Banks and Bryce Hansen defeated Johnny Swinger and Raj Singh by pinfall	Tag team match	—
2^{D}	Taylor Rising defeated Aurora Teves by pinfall	Singles match	—
3	Intergalactic Jet Setters (Kevin Knight and Kushida) and Aiden Prince defeated RRR (Rohan Raja, Rocky Romero and Rohit Raju) by pinfall	Six-man tag team match	11:11
4	El Reverso defeated Classy Ali (c) by pinfall	Singles match for the QPW Qatar Championship	6:33
5	Miyu Yamashita and Kylie Rae defeated Laynie Luck and Harley Cameron by pinfall	Tag team match	9:26
6	"Psycho" Mike Rollins defeated Trevor Lee, Jake Something, Stu Grayson, Alex Zayne and Sheldon Jean by pinfall	Six-way scramble	13:27
7	Mike Bailey defeated El Phantasmo by pinfall	Singles match	16:18
8	Raj Dhesi and Bhupinder Gujjar defeated Bully Ray and Q. T. Marshall (with Harley Cameron) by pinfall	Tag team match	12:23
9	Athena (c) defeated Gisele Shaw by pinfall	Singles match for the ROH Women's World Championship	23:52
10	Konosuke Takeshita (c) (with Don Callis) defeated Josh Alexander by pinfall	Singles match for the AEW International Championship	29:31
(c) / – the champion(s) heading into the match; D / – this was a dark match
