= PWA Champions Grail =

Professional wrestling championship

PWA Champion's Grail
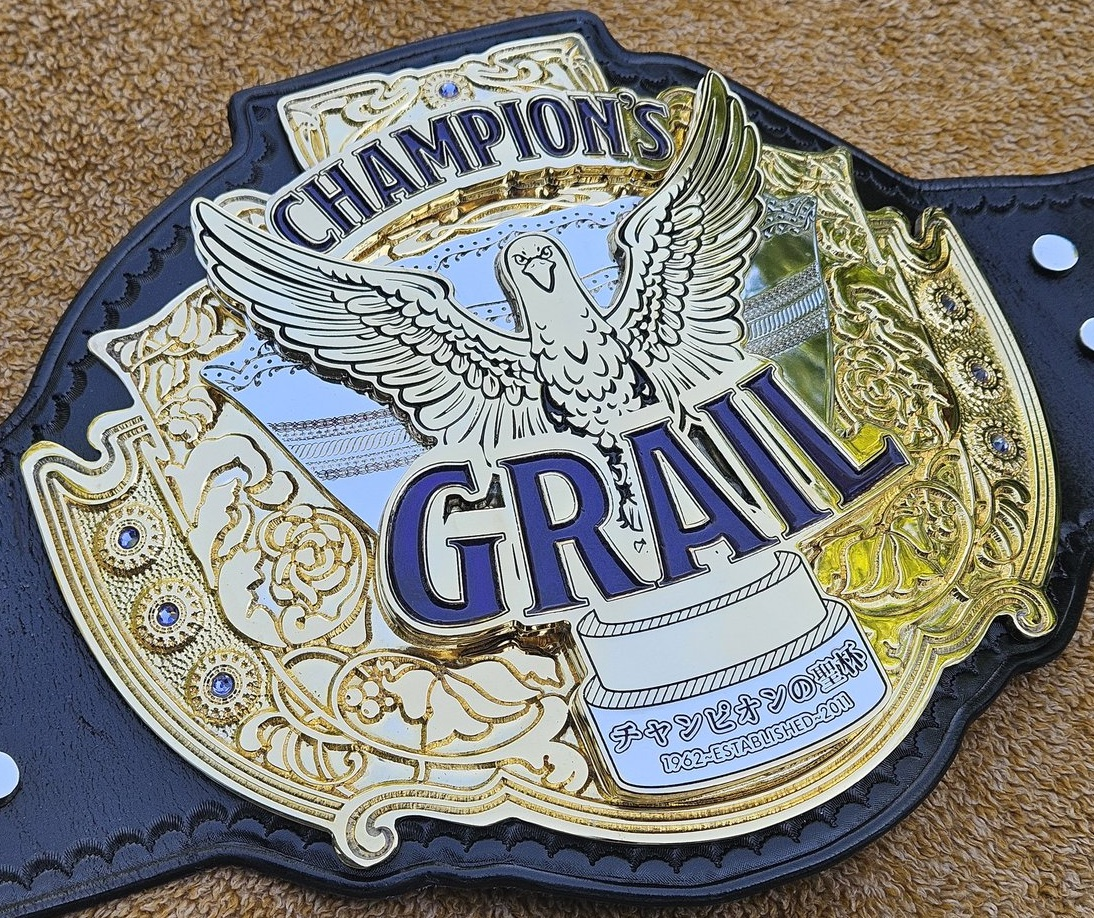

Details
- Promotion: Pro Wrestling Alliance (PWA); Maple Leaf Pro Wrestling (MLP); Oceania Pro Wrestling (OPW); Qatar Pro Wrestling (QPW)
- Date established: October 7, 2024
- Current champion: Stu Grayson
- Date won: June 13, 2026 (aired August 12, 2026)
Statistics
- First champion: Rohan Raja
- Longest reign: Rohan Raja (602 days)
- Oldest champion: Stu Grayson (37 years, 139 days)
- Youngest champion: Rohan Raja (32 years, 232 days)
- Heaviest champion: Rohan Raja (200 lb (91 kg))
- Lightest champion: Stu Grayson (193 lb (88 kg))

The PWA Champion's Grail is a professional wrestling championship established by the Pro Wrestling Alliance (PWA), which was formed through the collaboration of Maple Leaf Pro Wrestling (MLP), Oceania Pro Wrestling (OPW), and Qatar Pro Wrestling (QPW).

== History ==
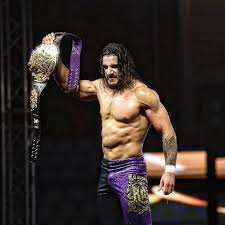
Inaugural champion Rohan Raja.

On August 19, 2024, Maple Leaf Pro Wrestling (MLP), Oceania Pro Wrestling (OPW), and Qatar Pro Wrestling (QPW) formed the Pro Wrestling Alliance (PWA) to work together on talent exchange and other collaborations.

On October 7, 2024, MLP announced that they would crown an inaugural PWA Champion's Grail holder on October 19, during the first night of Forged in Excellence. The origins of the Champion's Grail goes back to July 1, 1962, when Rikidōzan and Toyonobori defeated Buddy Austin and Mike Sharpe to win the Japan Pro Wrestling Alliance's Toyonaka tournament, awarding them the trophy that would become the first Champion's Grail. On December 15, 1963, Rikidōzan was murdered, and his family preserved his original Champion's Grail trophy in their home for over 60 years.

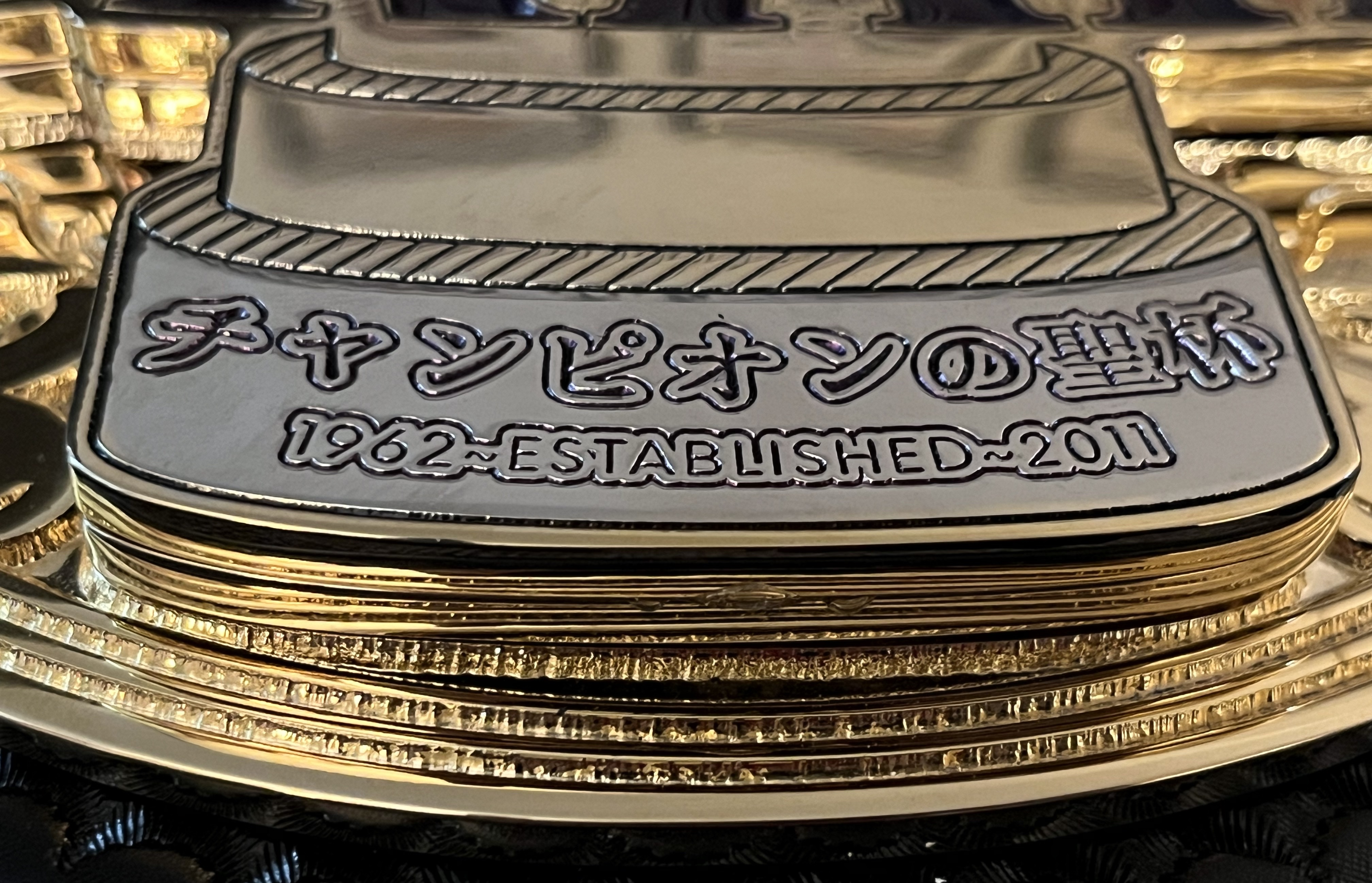
"Holy Grail of Champions"

The 1962 Toyonaka trophy would then be acquired by film producer Jeff Katz and merged with the 2011 Wrestling Retribution Project Champion's Grail tournament title won by Kenny Omega at the Jim Henson Company Lot in Hollywood, CA on October 13, 2011, officially creating the modern PWA Champion's Grail belt that is defended today.

At the first night of Forged in Excellence in Windsor, Ontario, "Ravenous" Rohan Raja defeated Jake Something to become the inaugural champion.

== Belt design ==
The PWA Champion's Grail was created by Belts By Dan, designer of championship belts for AEW, New Japan Pro Wrestling and many others. Showcasing a mix of English, Japanese and Latin text, the PWA Champion's Grail title belt boasts three layers, dual plating, hand nugget texturing and Swarovski stones.

The center plate denotes the shared Japanese and Hollywood establishment dates and proclaims the belt, in Japanese, as "チャンピオンの聖杯" or "Holy Grail of Champions." The original merged championship reigns of Rikidozan & Toyonobori in 1962 and Kenny Omega in 2011 are memorialized on the side plates, denoting their historical roles in the lineage of the modern Champion's Grail. The belt's motto is "Per Ardua Ad Astra," which is engraved into the clip of the snap box. Each snap box features a small dog paw print, a tribute to rescue dogs.

The influence of the film The Pope's Exorcist on the creation of the belt is seen in the red bird above the motto on the clip and the text "See Thee Beneath God" carved into the opposite snap box. The cinema roots of the championship belt are further displayed in the other snap box reading, in Japanese text, "リング内 X シネマ内 " or "Inside The Ring X Inside The Cinema."

Design inspirations for the championship belt include World Championship Wrestling's 90's United States championship and Big Gold Belt, WWE's Winged Eagle, New Japan Pro-Wrestling's 2nd and 4th generation IWGP Heavyweight Championship and the current Triple Crown Heavyweight Championship in All Japan Pro Wrestling. The purple colored backing is a nod to both Pro Wrestling Noah's GHC Heavyweight Championship and the original royal purple branding of the Wrestling Retribution Project. The eagle and trophy bowl on the center plate are designed to emulate Rikidozan & Toyonobori's classic 1962 Toyonaka prize.

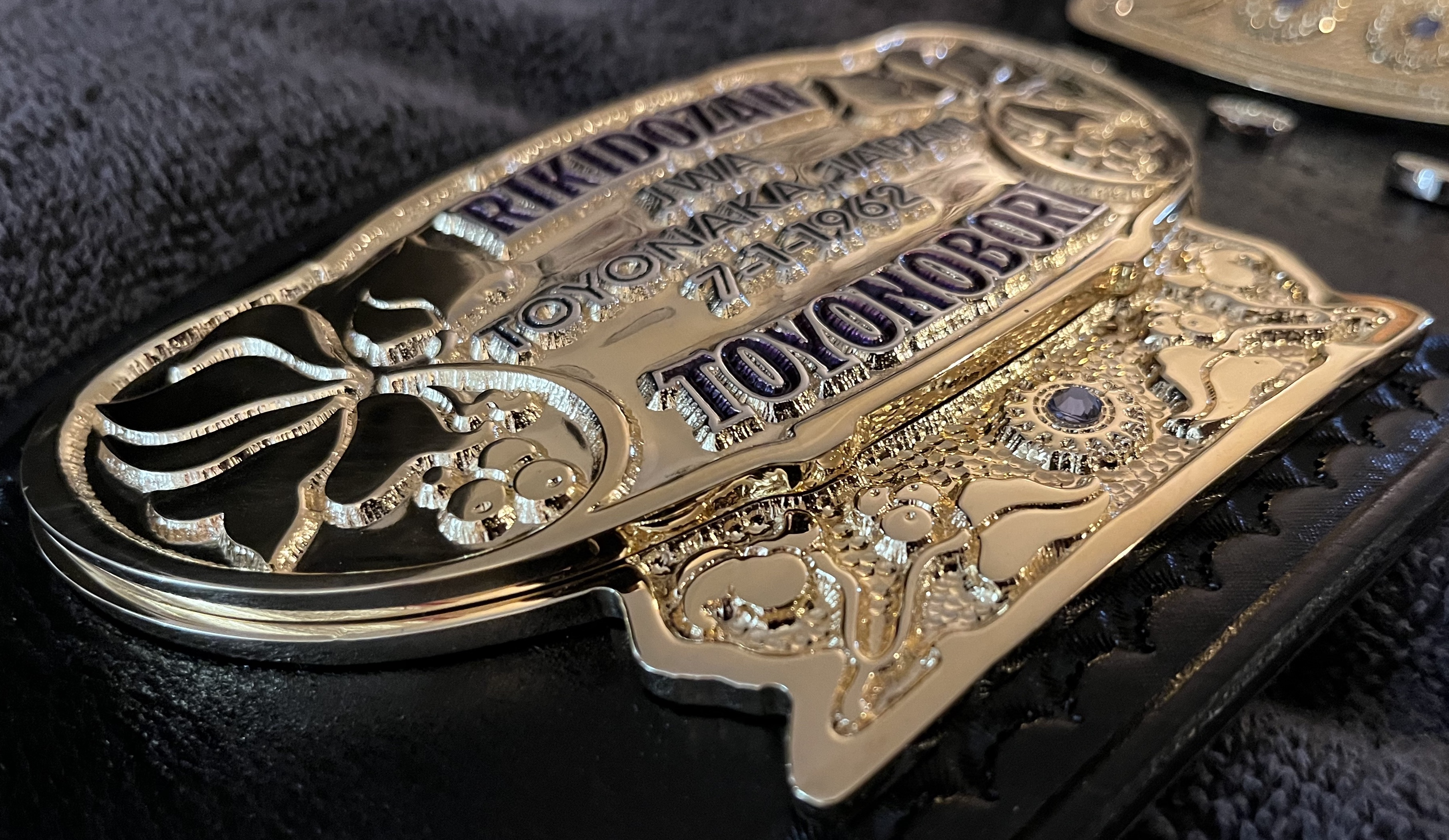
Rikidozan & Toyonobori side plate

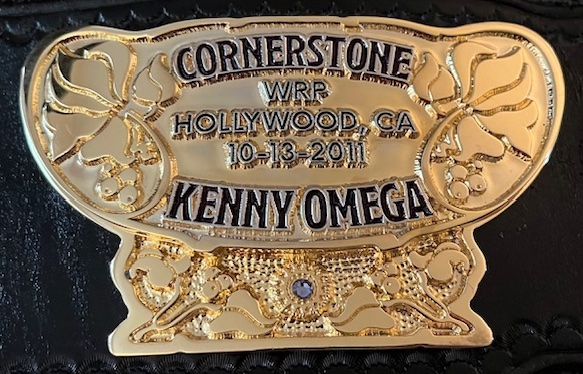
Kenny Omega side plate

== Reigns ==
As of October 30, 2026, there have between two reigns between two different champions. Rohan Raja is the inaugural champion and also the longest reigning champion at 602 days.

Stu Grayson is the current champion in his first reign. He won the title by defeating Rohan Raja on MLP Mayhem in Windsor, Ontario, on June 13, 2026 (aired August 16), in a Winner Takes All match in which Grayson's interim MLP Canadian Championship was also on the line.

Key
No.	Overall reign number
Reign	Reign number for the specific champion
Days	Number of days held
Days recog.	Number of days held recognized by the promotion
+	Current reign is changing daily

No.	Champion	Championship change			Reign statistics			Notes	Ref.
No.	Champion	Date	Event	Location	Reign	Days	Days recog.	Notes	Ref.
1	Rohan Raja	October 19, 2024	MLP Forged in Excellence	Windsor, Ontario, Canada	1	602	662	Defeated Jake Something to become the inaugural champion.	
2	Stu Grayson	June 13, 2026	MLP Mayhem	Windsor, Ontario, Canada	1	139+	79+	This was a Winner Takes All match in which Grayson's interim MLP Canadian Championship was also on the line. MLP recognizes Grayson's reign as beginning on August 12 when the episode aired on tape delay.	
