= Bhupinder Gujjar =

Indian professional wrestler (born 1994)

Personal information
- Born: Bhupinder Singh Gujjar; 4 December 1994 (age 31) Chandigarh, India

Professional wrestling career
- Ring name(s): Bhupinder; Bhupinder Singh; Bhupinder Gujjar; Rudra
- Billed from: Punjab, India
- Trained by: The Great Khali; Scott D'Amore
- Debut: 16 March 2019

Bhupinder Singh Gujjar (born 4 December 1994) is an Indian professional wrestler. He is signed to Maple Leaf Pro Wrestling (MLP), where he performs under the ring name Rudra. He is known for his time in Total Nonstop Action Wrestling (TNA), where he performed under the ring name Bhupinder Gujjar.

== Professional wrestling career ==
=== Early career (2019–2022) ===
Gujjar trained under The Great Khali at Continental Wrestling Entertainment. He made his professional wrestling debut on 16 March 2019.

Gujjar made a single appearance under the ring name Bhupinder Singh as part of the Desi Hit Squad in 2019.

=== Impact Wrestling / Total Nonstop Action Wrestling (2022–2024) ===
On the 3 February 2022 episode of Impact, Gujjar, under his real name, made his Impact in-ring debut against John Skyler in a winning effort. At Emergence faced Brian Myers for the Impact Digital Media Championship and lost. After a controversial disqualification victory in a Digital Media Championship match against Gujjar, Myers would settle his feud with Gujjar by defeating him in a ladder match on the 22 September episode of Impact!.

Gujjar left TNA upon the expiration of his contract on 31 December 2024.

== Championships and accomplishments ==
- Chem Valley Wrestling
  - CVW Championship (1 time)
- Impact/TNA Wrestling
  - Impact Year End Awards (1 time)
    - One to Watch in 2023 (2022)
- Pro Wrestling Illustrated
  - Ranked No. 298 of the top 500 singles wrestlers in the PWI 500 in 2022
