= Stu Grayson =

Canadian professional wrestler

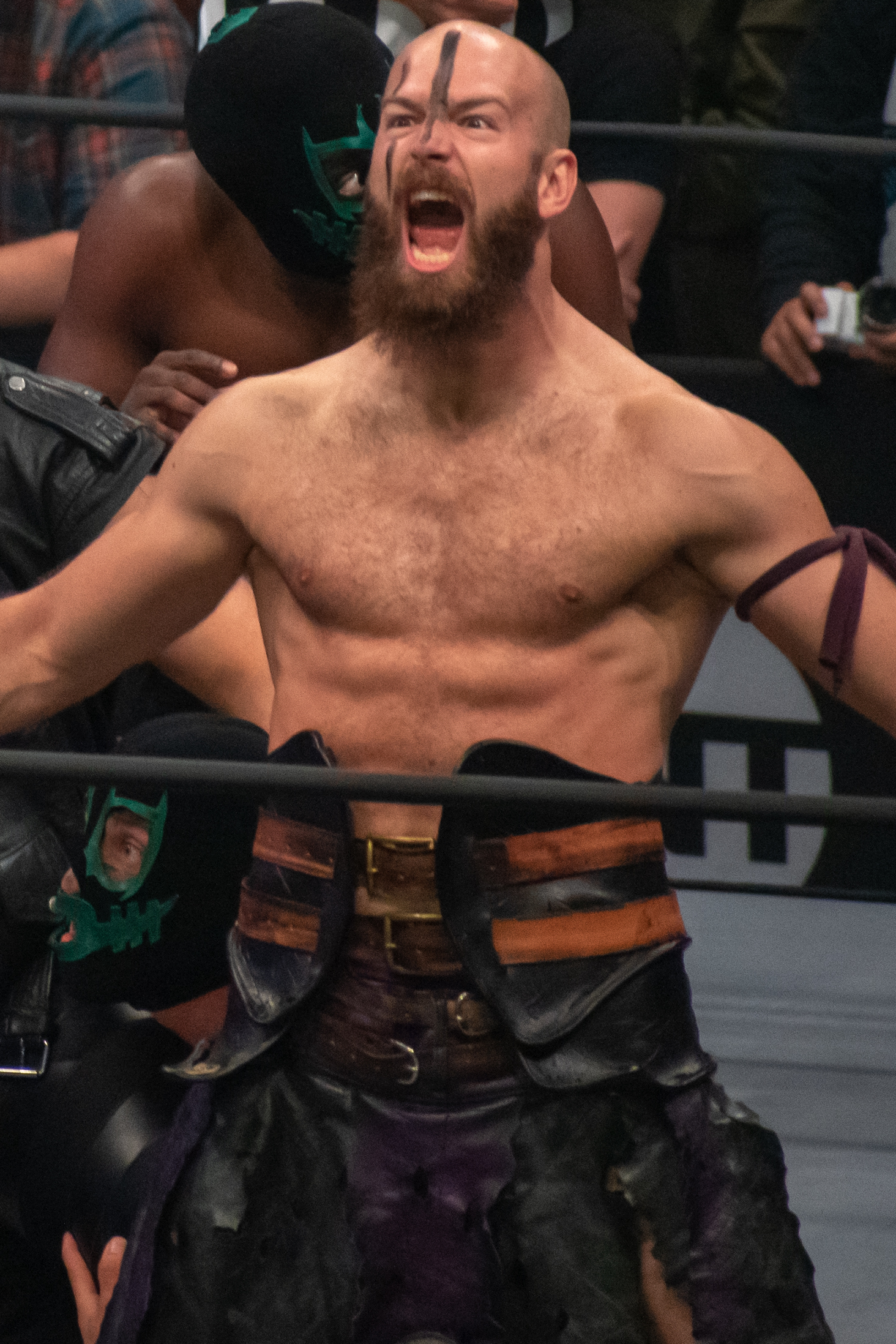
- Grayson in October 2019

Personal information
- Born: Marc Dionne; January 25, 1989 (age 37) Victoriaville, Quebec, Canada

Professional wrestling career
- Ring name(s): Dos; Player Dos; Stu Dos; Stupefied; Stu Grayson; Zombiefied
- Billed height: 5 ft 10 in (1.78 m)
- Billed weight: 193 lb (88 kg)
- Billed from: The Keep; The Marvel Universe; Mushroom Kingdom
- Trained by: Michael Von Payton; Wayne Cryderman
- Debut: September 2005

Marc Dionne (born January 25, 1989), better known by the ring name Stu Grayson, is a Canadian professional wrestler. He is signed to Mystery Wrestling and has performed on the Canadian independent circuit, predominantly for Maple Leaf Pro Wrestling (MLP), where he was the interim MLP Canadian Champion and the current holder of the PWA Champions Grail.

Formerly known as Stupefied or Player Dos, he regularly teamed with Player Uno as the Super Smash Brothers for various independent promotions across North America, including Chikara and Pro Wrestling Guerrilla (PWG). Together, they are former one-time Chikara Campeones de Parejas, one-time PWG World Tag Team Champions, and winners of PWG's 2012 Dynamite Duumvirate Tag Team Title Tournament. As Grayson, they began to work with All Elite Wrestling (AEW) in 2019 as part of the stable The Dark Order. Grayson parted ways with AEW in May 2022, although he rejoined the roster in March 2023. He exited the company a second time in April 2024.

== Professional wrestling career ==
=== International Wrestling Syndicate (2005–2010) ===
Stupefied made his debut in the Canadian wrestling promotion International Wrestling Syndicate (IWS). He quickly found a tag team partner in Player Uno as the Super Smash Brothers. The team found success as they soon won the IWS Tag Team Championship. He remained with the promotion until it folded on October 9, 2010.

=== Chikara (2007–2010) ===
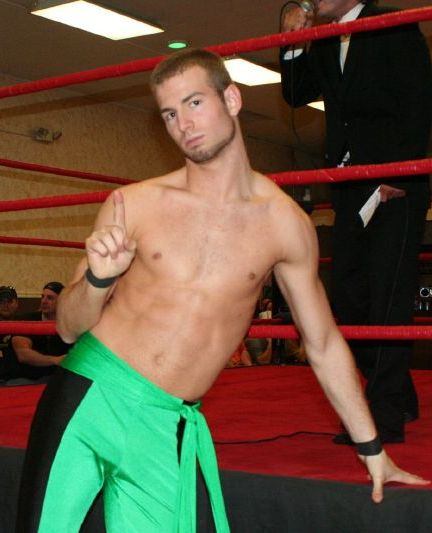
Dionne as Stupefied in November 2008

Stupefied debuted in Chikara in 2007 as one half of the Super Smash Bros., for the November triple-shot weekend. Stupefied was brought back for King of Trios, and became a regular wrestler at the fed. The tag team became a fan favorite, however, they had trouble picking up wins. In August 2008 after Stupefied had repackaged himself as Player Dos, the Super Smash Bros. began a winning streak which would peak on September 21, 2008, during Chikara's debut in the Midwest, when the Super Smash Bros. ended the record-breaking reign of Incoherence (Delirious and Hallowicked), becoming the 4th Chikara Campeones de Parejas. However, their reign came to an abrupt end on October 19, 2008, at the hands of the Osirian Portal (Amasis and Ophidian) in only their first defense.

On August 16, 2009, Player Dos won the seventh annual Young Lions Cup, defeating Colin Delaney in the finals. He would lose the title to Tim Donst on January 31, 2010.

On October 24, 2010, Player Dos teamed with Player Uno and wrestled to date his last Chikara match with BDK members Sara Del Rey and Daizee Haze in a losing effort.

=== Ring of Honor (2009–2010) ===
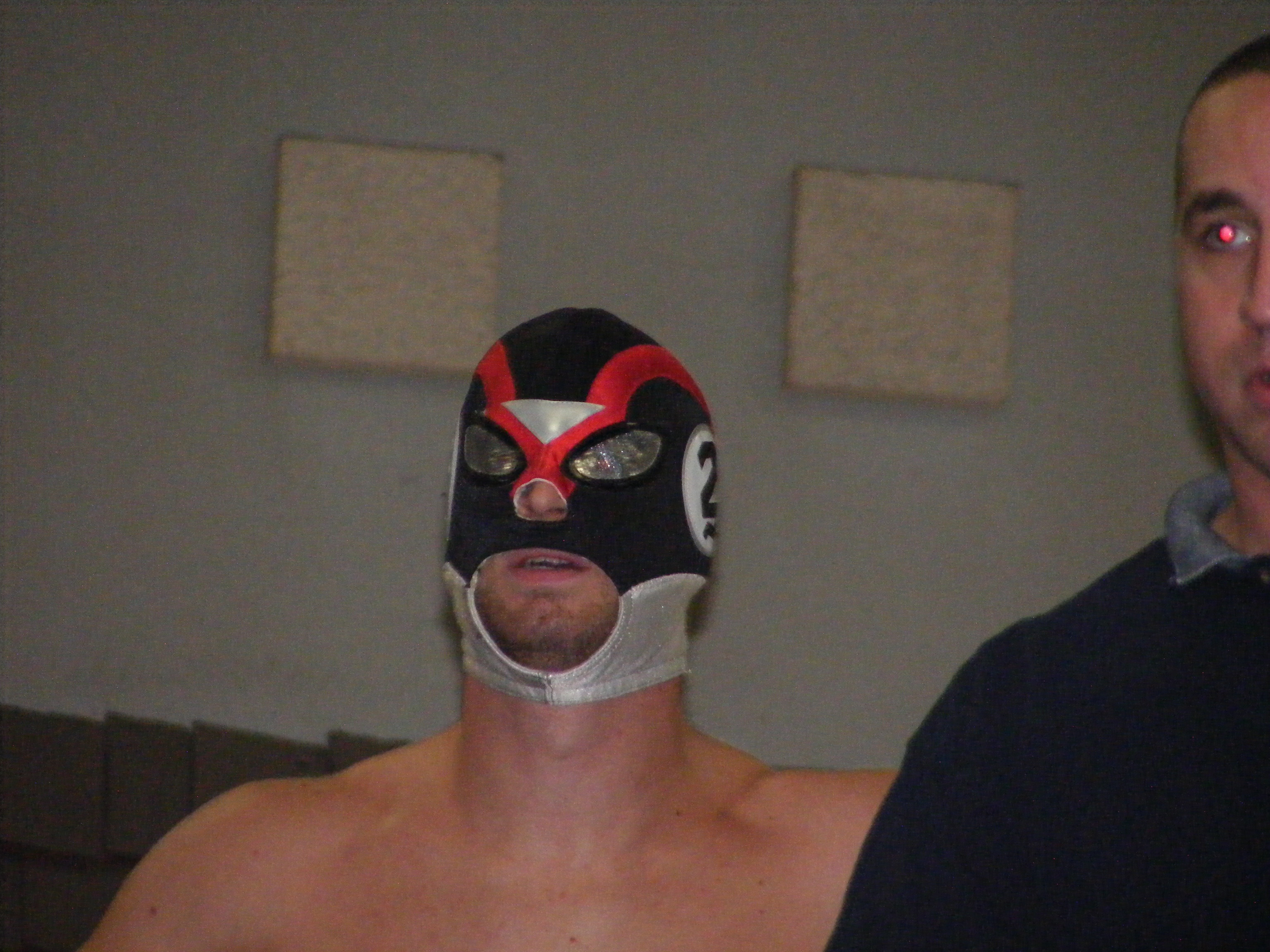
Dionne as Player Dos in August 2010

On April 18, 2009, Dionne made his Ring of Honor debut as a replacement for the injured El Generico, under the ring name Generico Dos, in a six-man tag team match where he, Kevin Steen and Kenny Omega were defeated by Austin Aries, Rhett Titus and Kenny King. The Super Smash Brothers made their ROH debut as a team on May 8, 2009, at Never Say Die, losing to the team of Titus and King. On July 25 in Toronto, Ontario, at Death Before Dishonor VII Night 2 they scored an upset victory over former ROH World Tag Team Champions Kevin Steen and El Generico. On the November 9 episode of Ring of Honor Wrestling on HDNet, Dos and Uno debuted on the show in a return match, where they were defeated by Steen and Generico. On ROH Epic Encounter III Dos wrestled Kevin Steen in a losing effort. He had teamed with Uno on several HDNet episode wrestling teams like The American Wolves and The Kings of Wrestling. Since the Summer of 2010, Dos has not appeared in the company since.

=== Dragon Gate USA (2012) ===
On January 28, 2012, the Super Smash Bros. made their debut for Dragon Gate USA, defeating The Scene (Caleb Konley and Scott Reed) in a tag team match. The following day, they picked up another win over the D.U.F. (Arik Cannon and Pinkie Sanchez), after which Uno asked for a shot at the Open the United Gate Championship. The Super Smash Bros.' win streak ended on November 2, when they were defeated by Genki Horiguchi and Ryo Saito in an Open the United Gate Championship number one contenders' match.

=== Pro Wrestling Guerrilla (2011–2013, 2019) ===
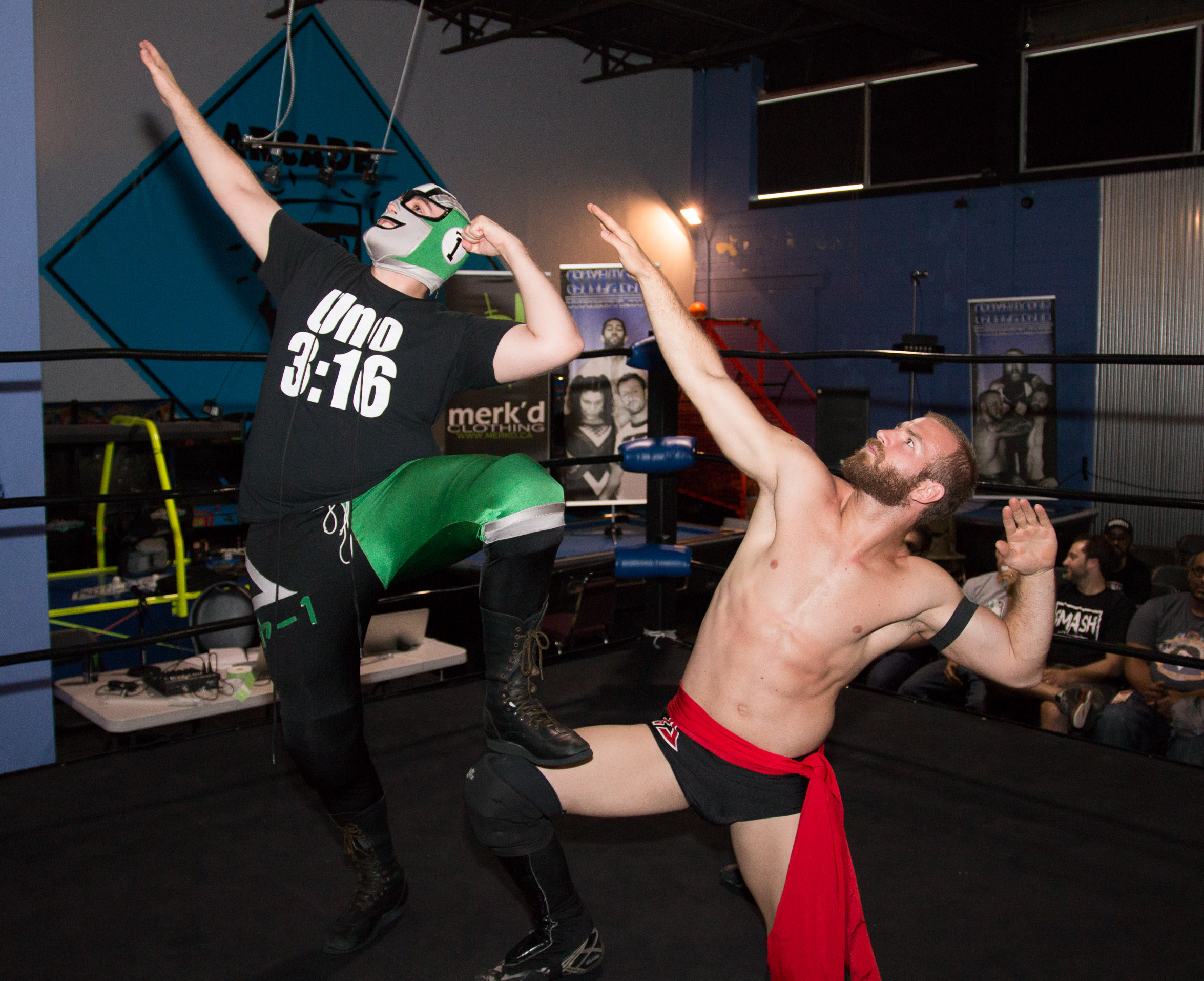
The Super Smash Bros. - Player Uno (left in mask) and Stu Dos performing their signature in-ring pose

On September 10, 2011, Stupefied debuted in Pro Wrestling Guerrilla (PWG) as a member of the Super Smash Bros. with Player Uno. In their debut match, they faced the RockNES Monsters (Johnny Goodtime and Johnny Yuma), a tag team with a similar video game-themed gimmick, in a losing effort. The Super Smash Bros. returned on December 10, 2011, this time losing a match against the American Wolves (Davey Richards and Eddie Edwards). The Super Smash Bros. picked up their first win in PWG on March 17, 2012, by defeating former two-time PWG World Tag Team Champions, The Young Bucks (Matt and Nick Jackson), and the RockNES Monsters in a three-way match. On April 21, the Super Smash Bros. defeated The Young Bucks in the opening round, Future Shock (Adam Cole and Kyle O'Reilly) in the semifinal, and 2 Husky Black Guys (El Generico and Willie Mack) in the final round to win the 2012 Dynamite Duumvirate Tag Team Title Tournament and become number one contenders to the PWG World Tag Team Championship.

On May 25, the Super Smash Bros. defeated The Young Bucks in a No Disqualification match to win the vacant PWG World Tag Team Championship. The Super Smash Bros. made their first successful title defense on July 21 at Threemendous III, PWG's nine-year anniversary event, where they defeated Future Shock and The Young Bucks in a three-way ladder match. On December 1 at Mystery Vortex, the Super Smash Bros. made their second successful World Tag Team Championship defense against the RockNES Monsters. Later that same event, they were defeated by the Dojo Bros (Eddie Edwards and Roderick Strong) in a non-title match. On January 12, 2013, the Super Smash Bros. lost the World Tag Team Championship to the Unbreakable F'n Machines (Brian Cage and Michael Elgin) in the opening round of the 2013 Dynamite Duumvirate Tag Team Title Tournament.

=== All Elite Wrestling (2019–2024) ===
Stu Grayson and Evil Uno made their surprise debut as The Dark Order at AEW Double or Nothing on May 25, 2019, appearing at the conclusion of the match between Best Friends and Angélico and Jack Evans. After the match was over, the lights went out and when they came back on, Grayson and Uno were in the ring. The lights went out a second time and when they came back on, masked henchmen surrounded the ring. The Order then attacked all four men. After the attack, the lights went out again and they disappeared. On May 2, 2022, it was announced that Grayson's contract had expired, as both sides had failed to reach an agreement for a re-signing. On October 14 episode of Rampage, Stu made a cameo in a backstage segment with the Dark Order stating that they couldn't come to his country (Canada) without him making an appearance. He was re-signed and returned on the March 15, 2023, episode of Dynamite. On April 1, 2024, it was reported that Grayson had been released from AEW, ending his second tenure with the company.

=== Independent circuit (2025–present) ===
Following his AEW departure, Grayson returned to the Canadian independent scene competing for promotions like North Shore Pro Wrestling, Victory Ring and Mystery Wrestling.

On October 19, 2024, Grayson made his debut for Maple Leaf Pro Wrestling (MLP) on Night 1 of their inaugural event Forged in Excellence, teaming with El Phantasmo and Josh Alexander to defeat Trevor Lee, Rocky Romero and Alex Zayne at six-man tag team match. On October 20 at Night 2 of the event, Grayson was defeated with Trevor Lee, Jake Something, Alex Zayne and Sheldon Jean by Psycho Mike in six-way scramble match.

On March 14, 2025, at first night of Mayhem Grayson challenging Mo Jabari with Taiji Ishimori, Brent Banks, Michael AR Clark and Rich Swann for the Jericho Cruise Oceanic Championship in a losing effort. On March 15, at second night Grayson was defeated with Kaito Kiyomiya and Taiji Ishimori by Alex Zayne in four-way match. On May 10, at Northern Rising, Grayson challenging Thom Latimer for the NWA World's Heavyweight Championship in a losing effort. On July 5, at Resurrection was originally have singles match against Sheldon Jean, but after attacks by Bryce Hansen match was restarted as a tag team match by Director of Authority Santino Marella, there he won with his former partner at The Dark Order Evil Uno. On September 5, at Sacred Ground Grayson defeated Tarik and Ace Austin in three-way match.

On March 27, 2026, at Global Wars Canada, Grayson challenging Rohan Raja for the PWA Champions Grail in a losing effort. On March 28 at Uprising, due to lineal champion Josh Alexander having to undergo knee surgery, Grayson won a gauntlet eliminator match to become the interim MLP Canadian Champion. On July 15, at MLP Mayhem, Grayson successfully defended his title against Jonathan Gresham. On August 12, at MLP Mayhem, Grayson defeat Rohan Raja in a Winner Take All match to both retain the interim MLP Canadian Championship and win Raja's PWA Champions Grail. On August 15, at Wrestlefest, Grayson successfully defended his title against Jonny DeLuca. On September 2, at MLP Mayhem he successfully defended his title against Johnny TV. On September 11, at Sacred Ground, he successfully defended his title against Breeze. On October 3 at Northern Rising, Grayson will fight against returning Josh Alexander for Unified MLP Canadian Championship. On September 25, 2026, it was announced that Grayson had signed with Mystery Wrestling, a promotion owned by AEW and Ring of Honor wrestler Evil Uno. On September 26, at MLP London Comic Con, he successfully defended his title against Bryce Hansen. At Northern Rising, Grayson lost Josh Alexander with Alexander being crowned Undisputed MLP Canadian Champion.

== Professional wrestling style and persona ==
In Chikara, Stupefied based his gimmick, moveset, and attire around video games, more specifically games for the NES and SNES consoles. One of his trademarks was his tights, which had a pocket fashioned around an NES console on one side; for instance, if the Karate Kid game cartridge was inserted into the slot, he would start doing game-related mannerisms.

In recent years, Grayson transitioned from a fast-paced, highly athletic style to a more physical and methodical approach. While still known for his athleticism, he placed greater emphasis on striking, ring psychology, and efficient storytelling, reflecting his growing experience as both a wrestler and trainer.

== Personal life ==
Dionne owns a small flooring company.

Along with Evil Uno, the two own and run a pro wrestling school out of Gatineau, Quebec known as "The Keep", where Grayson is the head coach, and trains up and coming wrestlers with the man who trained him, Michael Von Payton, and Canadian independent pro-wrestler, James Stone.

== Championships and accomplishments ==
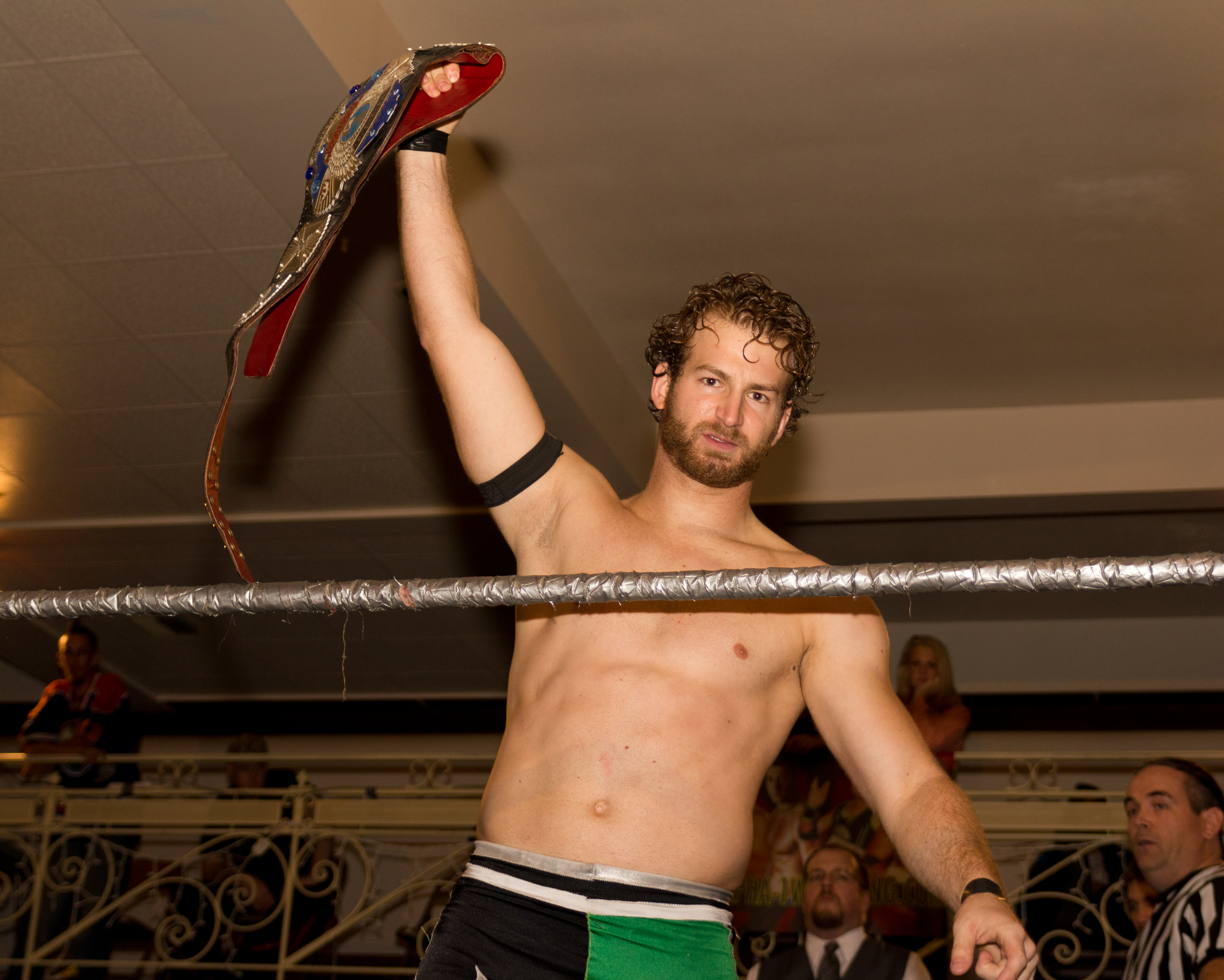
Player Dos holding the Alpha-1 Tag Team Championship

- Alpha-1 Wrestling
  - A1 Tag Team Championship (2 times) – with Player Uno
- Capital City Championship Combat
  - C4 Championship (1 time)
- Chem Valley Wrestling
  - CVW Heavyweight Championship (1 time, current)
- Chikara
  - Campeonatos de Parejas (1 time) – with Player Uno
  - Chikara Young Lions Cup (1 time)
  - Young Lions Cup VII
- Combat Revolution Wrestling
  - CRW Interim Tag Team Championship (1 time) – with Player Uno
- Federation de Lutte Québécois
  - FLQ Heavyweight Championship (2 times, final)
  - FLQ Heavyweight Championship Tournament (2016)
- International Wrestling Syndicate
  - IWS World Tag Team Championship (1 time) – with Player Uno
- Lucha Toronto
  - Royal Canadian Tag Team Championship (2 times) - with Evil Uno
- Maple Leaf Pro Wrestling
  - Interim MLP Canadian Championship (1 time)
  - PWA Champions Grail (1 time, current)
- Mystery Wrestling
  - Mystery Wrestling World Championship (1 time)
- Pro Wrestling Guerrilla
  - PWG World Tag Team Championship (1 time) – with Player Uno
  - Dynamite Duumvirate Tag Team Title Tournament (2012) – with Player Uno
- Pro Wrestling Illustrated
  - Ranked No. 186 of the top 500 singles wrestlers in the PWI 500 in 2026
- SoCal Uncensored
  - Match of the Year (2012) with Player Uno vs. Future Shock (Adam Cole and Kyle O'Reilly) and The Young Bucks (Matt Jackson and Nick Jackson) on July 21
  - Tag Team of the Year (2012) – with Player Uno
- Squared Circle Wrestling
  - 2CW Tag Team Championship (1 time) – with Player Uno
- Victory Ring
  - Victory Ring Championship (1 time)
