= Alex Zayne =

American professional wrestler

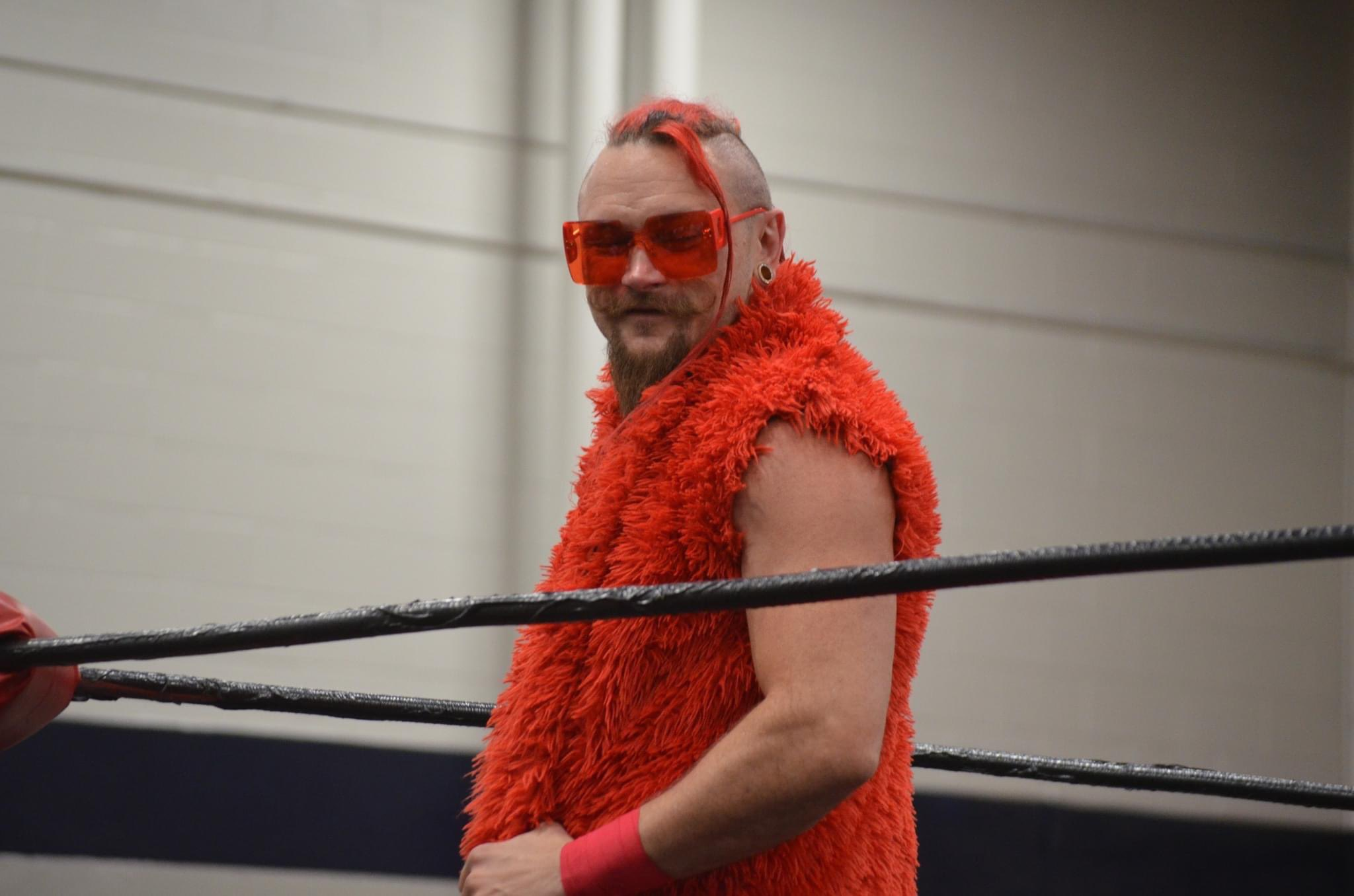
- Zayne in April 2023

Personal information
- Born: Alex Zayne Brandenburg; October 28, 1986 (age 39) Lexington, Kentucky, U.S.

Professional wrestling career
- Ring name(s): Alex Zayne; Andras Vidal; Ari Sterling; Zayne
- Billed height: 6 ft 1 in (185 cm)
- Billed weight: 202 lb (92 kg)
- Billed from: Lexington, Kentucky
- Trained by: Backyard wrestling WWE Performance Center
- Debut: March 31, 2007

Alex Zayne Brandenburg (born October 28, 1986) is an American professional wrestler primarily working on the independent circuit under the ring name Alex Zayne. He is best known for his tenures with New Japan Pro-Wrestling (NJPW), Impact Wrestling, Ring of Honor (ROH), and Game Changer Wrestling (GCW). He is also known for his time in WWE, where he performed under the ring name Ari Sterling.

== Professional wrestling career ==
=== Independent circuit (2021–present) ===
Zayne debuted in several small wrestling promotions, including Resolute Wrestling in Crossville, TN in 2019/2020 where he's held several championships throughout the years before making it big time. Zayne made his debut in NJPW on November 11, 2019, at New Japan Showdown, in a tag team match, where he and Aaron Solow lost against Amazing Red and T. J. Perkins. Since March 2020, due to the COVID-19 pandemic in the United States, Zayne was unable to work on NJPW events in Japan, leading him to take part in NJPW Strong series. His big matches and performances led him to a WWE Try-out, which he passed, leading him to leave NJPW and sign with WWE in the spring of 2021.

In the fall of 2021, Zayne was released from WWE as part of budget cuts relating to the Coronavirus (COVID-19) pandemic, and returned to NJPW Strong, and made his return match at New Japan Showdown defeating Ariya Davari. Zayne then later faced Will Ospreay on November 17, at the second NJPW's XTRA show in a losing effort. On May 1, Zayne was announced to take part in the 2022 Best of the Super Juniors in Japan. At the tournament, Zayne finished the tournament with a record of four wins and five losses, failing to advance to the finals of the tournament. During the tournament, Zayne formed a tag team with Ace Austin. However, on June 3, Austin joined the Bullet Club, this led Zayne questioning Austin's actions before being laid out by Austin and the Bullet Club. On the June 20th episode of IMPACT, Austin defeated Zayne with the help of Chris Bey.

== Championships and accomplishments ==
- 3-2-1 BATTLE!
  - Six Pack Challenge (2018)
- Hope Wrestling
  - HOPE Young Guns Championship (1 time)
- Pro Wrestling Illustrated
  - Ranked No. 227 of the top 500 singles wrestlers of the PWI 500 in 2020
- USA Championship Wrestling
  - USACW Heavyweight Championship (1 time)
- Resolute Wrestling
  - Resolute Pound 4 Pound Championship (1 time)
  - Resolute Wrestling Tag Team Championship (1 time) - with Caleb Courageous
- Ring of Honor
  - Honor Rumble Winner (2021)
