= MLP Canadian Championship =

Men's professional wrestling championship

- The current design of the championship (2024–present)

Details
- Promotion: Maple Leaf Pro Wrestling (MLP)
- Date established: May 10, 2025
- Current champion: Josh Alexander

Other names
- MLP Canadian Championship (2025–present); Undisputed MLP Canadian Championship (2026)
Statistics
- First champion: Josh Alexander
- Most reigns: All titleholders (1)
- Longest reign: Josh Alexander (542+ days)

The MLP Canadian Championship is a men's professional wrestling championship created and promoted by independent Canadian professional wrestling company Maple Leaf Pro Wrestling (MLP). The inaugural and current champion is Josh Alexander. He won the title by last eliminating Matt Cardona in the Gauntlet For The Gold at Northern Rising in Toronto, Ontario, Canada, on May 10, 2025. He also defeated interim champion Stu Grayson to become the undisputed MLP Canadian Champion on October 3, 2026 at Northern Rising.

== History ==
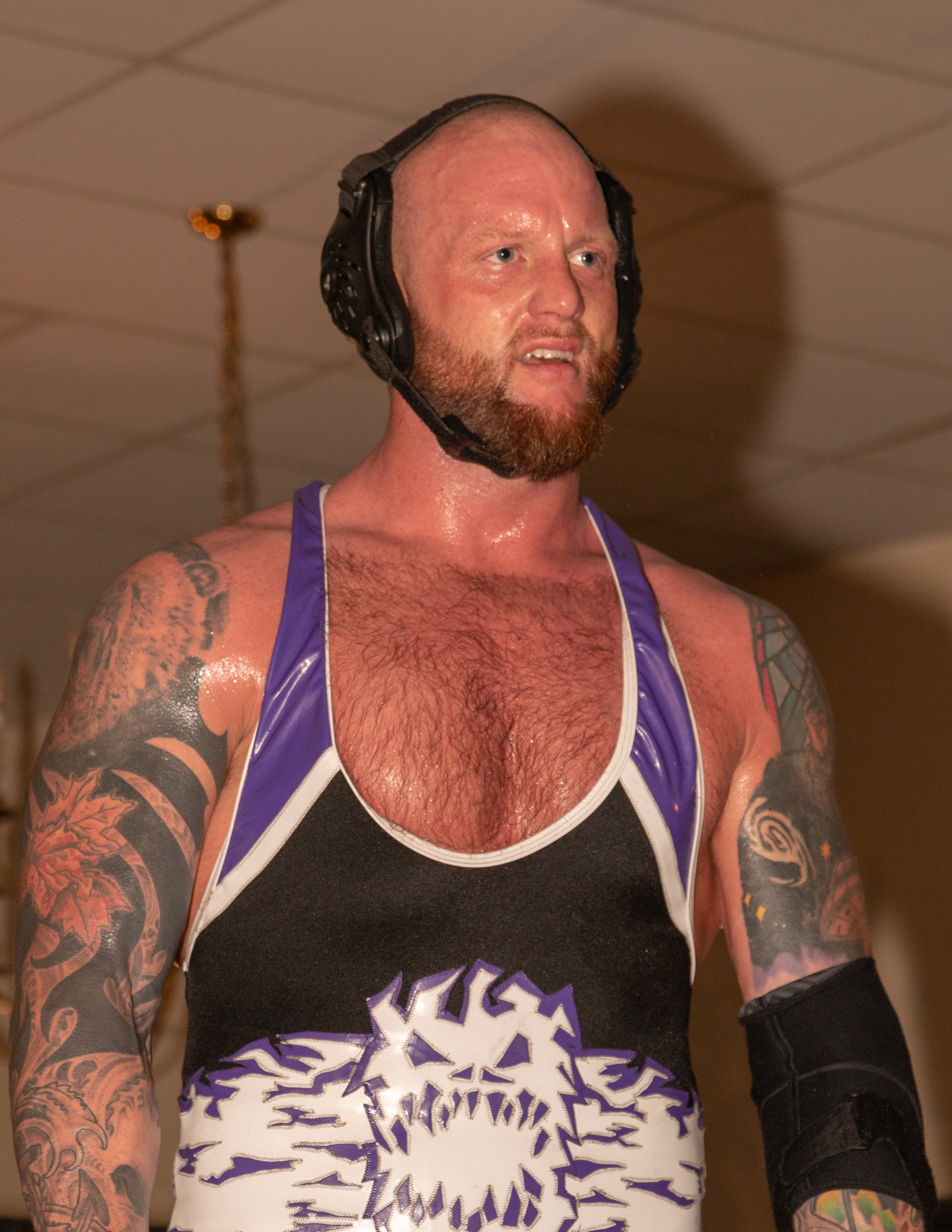
Inaugural and current champion Josh Alexander.

On May 10, 2025 Josh Alexander became the inaugural MLP Canadian champion by lastly eliminating Matt Cardona in a 20-man Gauntlet For The Gold match at Northern Rising.

Sometime in early March, Alexander substained a knee injury that required him to undergo surgery. Rather than stripping Alexander of the championship, an interim champion would be crowned in a gauntlet eliminator match at Uprising in Windsor, Ontario, Canada. On March 28, 2026 Stu Grayson became the interim champion at the MLP Uprising by last eliminating Jonathan Gresham. On October 3, 2026 at Northern Rising, Alexander defeated Grayson to unify the titles and become the undisputed MLP Canadian Champion.

== Reigns ==
Name	Years
MLP Canadian Championship	May 10, 2025 – October 3, 2026; October 3, 2026 – present
Undisputed MLP Canadian Championship	October 3, 2026 – October 3, 2026

As of November 3, 2026.

Key
No.	Overall reign number
Reign	Reign number for the specific champion
Days	Number of days held
+	Current reign is changing daily

No.	Champion	Championship change			Reign statistics		Notes	Ref.
No.	Champion	Date	Event	Location	Reign	Days	Notes	Ref.
1	Josh Alexander	May 10, 2025	Northern Rising	Toronto, Ontario, Canada	1	542+	Last eliminated Matt Cardona in the 20-man Gauntlet For The Gold match to become the inaugural champion.	
—	Stu Grayson (Interim)	March 28, 2026	Uprising	Windsor, Ontario, Canada	—	189	Due to Josh Alexander undergoing knee surgery, an interim champion was crowned. Grayson last eliminated Jonathan Gresham in an gauntlet eliminator match to become the interim MLP Canadian Champion. On October 3, 2026 at Northern Rising, Alexander defeated Grayson to unify the titles and become the undisputed MLP Canadian Champion. Making Grayson no longer interim nor lineal champion.	
