= Maple Leaf Pro Wrestling =

Canadian professional wrestling promotion

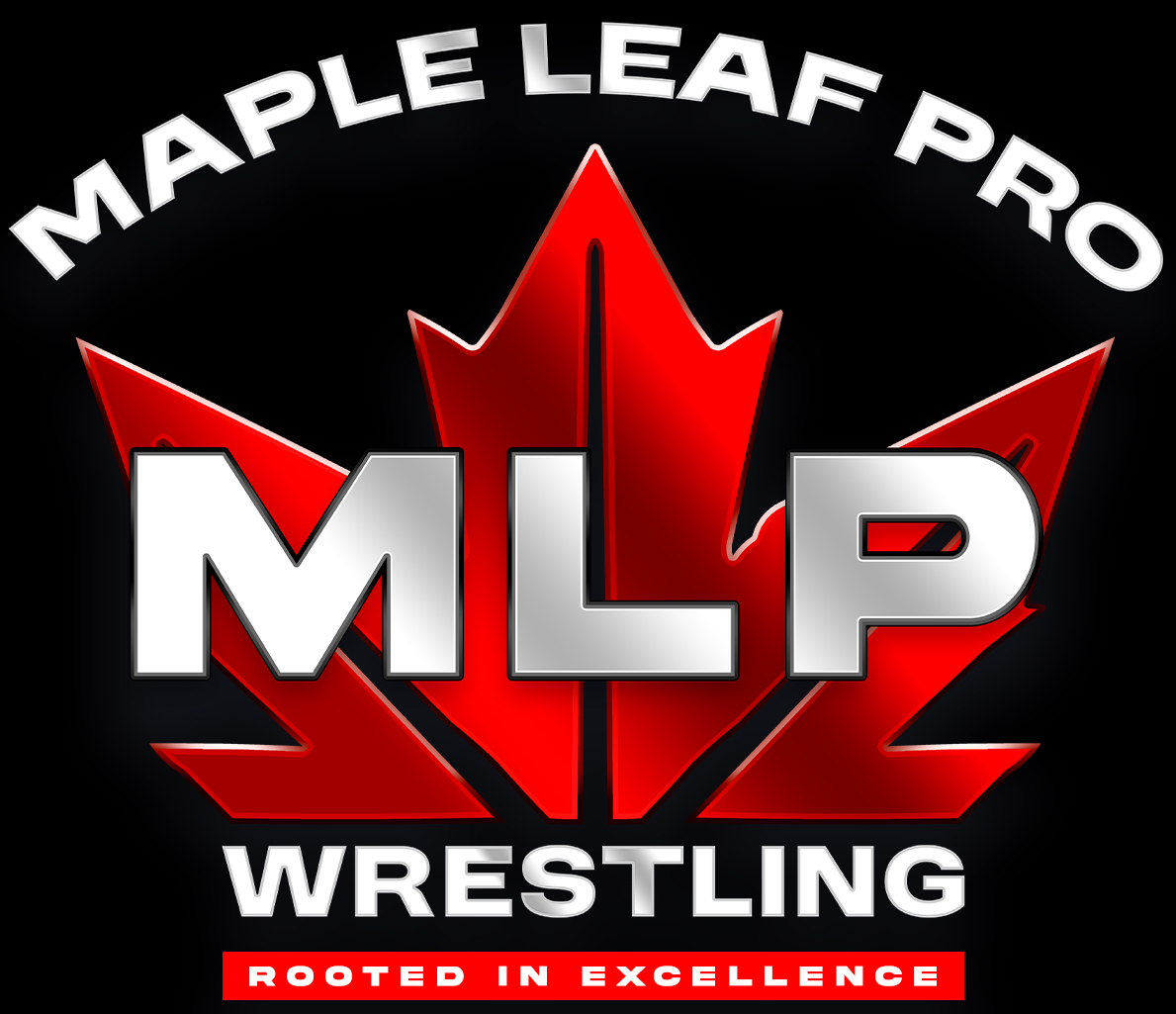
- Acronym: MLP
- Founded: August 8, 2024; 2 years ago
- Headquarters: Toronto, Ontario, Canada
- Founder: Scott D'Amore
- Owner: Scott D'Amore
- Website: https://mlpwrestling.com/

Maple Leaf Pro Wrestling (MLP) is a Canadian professional wrestling promotion owned by Scott D'Amore. MLP is the spiritual successor to Maple Leaf Wrestling, a promotion run by Frank Tunney in Toronto, Ontario, Canada during the 1970s and 1980s. D'Amore (owner of Border City Wrestling (BCW), and former president of Total Nonstop Action Wrestling (TNA) acquired the trademarks in 2024, and formally announced a revival of the brand on August 8 of that year.

== History ==
On April 14, 2024, Michael E. Dockins filed a trademark for "Maple Leaf Wrestling". The address listed on the filing was for Border City Wrestling (BCW), owned by former Total Nonstop Action Wrestling (TNA) president Scott D’Amore.

On August 8, D’Amore announced a relaunch of the Maple Leaf Wrestling brand dubbed Maple Leaf Pro Wrestling (MLP). Its inaugural two-night event, "Forged in Excellence", took place on October 19 and 20 at St. Clair College in Windsor, Ontario, and streamed live on Triller TV. The promotion has since began uploading archival footage of the original Maple Leaf Wrestling, as well as classic content from BCW, on its new YouTube channel and social media platforms.

On August 19, 2024, MLP announced the formation of the Pro Wrestling Alliance (PWA) with Qatar Pro Wrestling (QPW) and Oceania Pro Wrestling (OPW). The promotion announced Mauro Ranallo as "The Voice" of MLP; handling announcing, promotional vignettes, commercials and match previews, and All Elite Wrestling (AEW) personality Don Callis as colour commentator.

On October 7, 2024, MLP and the PWA announced Rohan Raja and Jake Something would compete on night one of "Forged in Excellence" for the inaugural Champion’s Grail, a title to be defended across all PWA members. On Night One at Forged in Excellence, Raja defeated Something to become the inaugural PWA Champion's Grail holder.

MLP held their first event of 2025, Mayhem, at St. Clair College from March 14-15. A third event, Northern Rising, was held on May 10 at Maple Leaf Gardens, where they crowned Josh Alexander as their inaugural MLP Canadian Champion and Gisele Shaw as their inaugural MLP Canadian Women's Champion.

During Global Wars Canada on March 27, 2026, MLP announced a television deal with The Sports Network (TSN). The show, titled MLP Mayhem, premiered on July 12 of that year, and was produced under a seasonal format, with twelve episodes airing that first season. On July 10, 2026, MLP announced that they had signed a streaming deal with MyAEW to air Mayhem for viewers outside of Canada.

== Partnerships ==
MLP has partnership agreements with several promotions around the world. On February, 2026, MLP and the Mexican promotion Consejo Mundial de Lucha Libre (CMLL) announced their partnership.

== Current champions ==
As of November 1, 2026

=== Men's division ===
Singles

Championship	Current champion(s)	Date won	Days held	Location	Notes
MLP Canadian Championship	Josh Alexander	May 10, 2025	540+	Toronto, Ontario, Canada	Last eliminated Matt Cardona in a 20-man Gauntlet For The Gold at MLP Northern Rising to become the inaugural champion.
PWA Champions Grail	Stu Grayson	June 13, 2026	141+	Windsor, Ontario, Canada	Defeated Rohan Raja in a Winner Takes All match at MLP Mayhem in which Grayson's interim MLP Canadian Championship was also on the line.

==== Tag team ====
Championship	Current champion(s)	Date won	Days held	Location	Notes
MLP Canadian Tag Team Championship	Grizzled Young Veterans (James Drake and Zack Gibson)	October 3, 2026	29+	Toronto, Ontario, Canada	Defeated champion 1st faction (Brent Banks and Sheldon Jean) and Sinner & Saint (Judas Icarus and Travis Williams) at MLP Northern Rising.

=== Women's division ===
Championship	Current champion(s)	Date won	Days held	Location	Notes
MLP Canadian Women's Championship	Priscilla Kelly	August 8, 2026	85+	Windsor, Ontario, Canada	Defeated Gisele Shaw at Mayhem

== See also ==
- Professional wrestling in Canada
- List of independent wrestling promotions in Canada
