= Northern Rising (2026) =

2026 Maple Leaf Pro Wrestling event

- Promotional poster of the event
- Promotion: Maple Leaf Pro Wrestling
- Date: October 3, 2026
- City: Toronto, Ontario, Canada
- Venue: Mattamy Athletic Centre at Maple Leaf Gardens

MLP pay-per-view chronology
← Previous; Multiverse	Next → —

Northern Rising chronology
← Previous; 2025	Next → —

Northern Rising was a professional wrestling pay-per-view event produced by Maple Leaf Pro Wrestling (MLP), which took place on October 3, 2026 at the Mattamy Athletic Centre at Maple Leaf Gardens in Toronto, Ontario, Canada and was streamed live on MyAEW and PPV.com. The event also featured wrestlers from partner promotions All Elite Wrestling (AEW) and Mystery Wrestling.

Eleven matches were contested at the event, including three on the Countdown to Northern Rising pre-show. In the main event, AEW's Adam Copeland defeated Steve Maclin in a Street Fight. In other prominent matches, lineal champion Josh Alexander defeated interim champion Stu Grayson to become the undisputed MLP Canadian Champion, Grizzled Young Veterans (James Drake and Zack Gibson) defeated 1st Faction (Sheldon Jean and Brent Banks) and Sinner and Saint (Judas Icarus and Travis Williams) in a three-way tag team match to win the MLP Canadian Tag Team Championship, Priscilla Kelly defeated Nikki Storm to retain the MLP Canadian Women's Championship, AEW's Andrade El Ídolo defeated Rohan Raja, and Psycho Mike defeated Crazy Steve and Dan Maff in a Monster's Mayhem match

== Production ==
=== Background ===
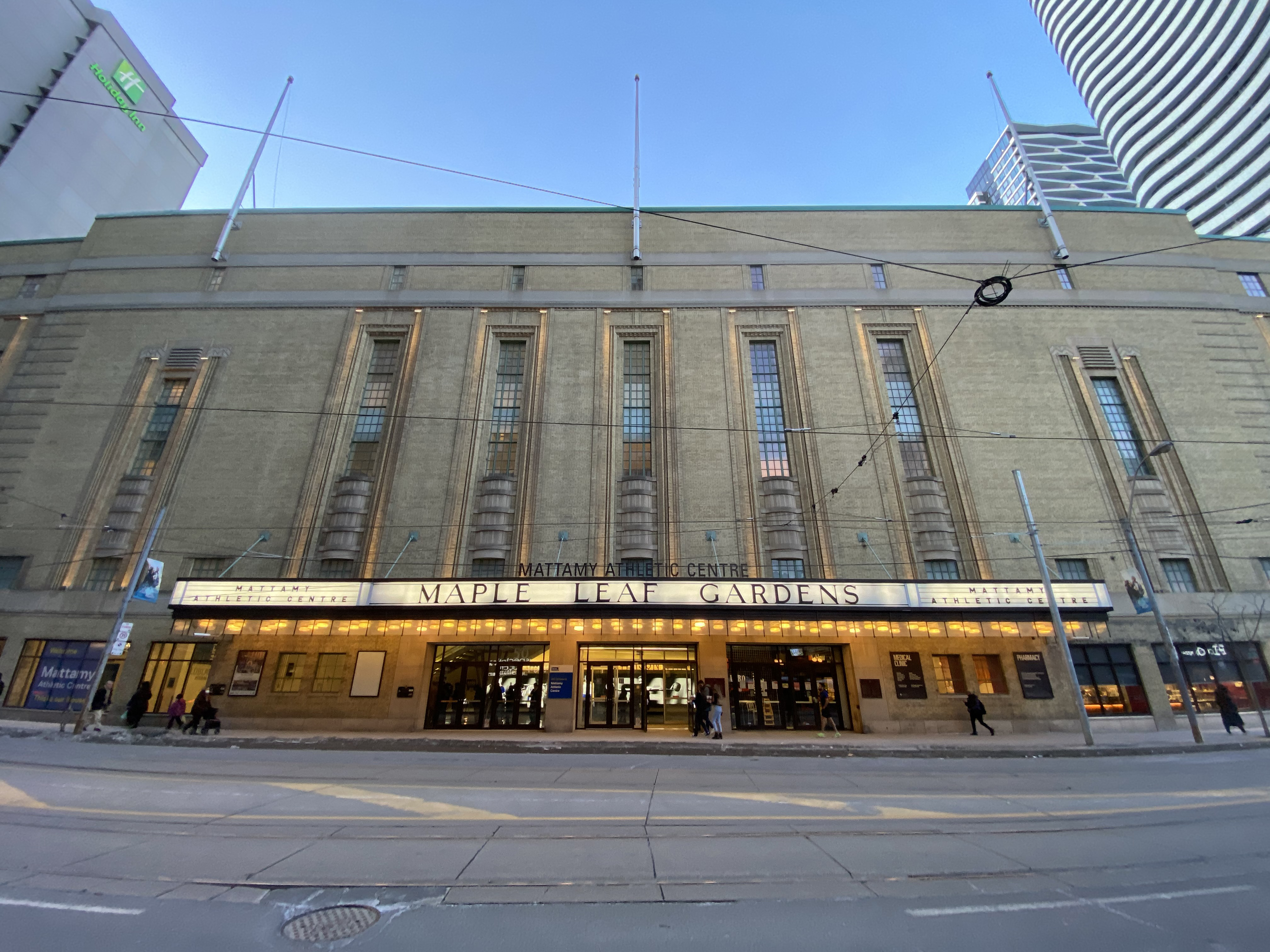
The event took place at the Mattamy Athletic Centre at Maple Leaf Gardens in Toronto, Ontario, Canada.

On May 10, 2025, MLP held its first show at the Mattamy Athletic Centre at Maple Leaf Gardens in Toronto, Ontario, Canada titled Northern Rising. The event featured the final rounds of a tournament to crown the inaugural MLP Women's Canadian Champion with the winner of the tournament being Gisele Shaw who defeated Kylie Rae.

During Global Wars Canada on March 27, 2026, MLP announced a television deal with The Sports Network (TSN) that will see a weekly television show, MLP Mayhem, begin airing in July 2026. On March 28, 2026 during the Uprising pay-per-view, Maple Leaf Pro Wrestling would announce television tapings for the show which took place on June 12, 2026, June 13, 2026, August 7, 2026, and August 8, 2026 at St. Clair College in Windsor, Ontario, Canada. On April 20, 2026, Maple Leaf Pro Wrestling announced that the show would air in a seasonal format with 12 episodes being taped for the first season. On April 25, 2026, Maple Leaf Pro Wrestling would announce that interim MLP Canadian Champion Stu Grayson, Jay Lethal, the New Age Outlaws (Road Dogg and Billy Gunn), Bishop Dyer, Blake Christian, Rohan Raja, MLP Canadian Women's Champion Gisele Shaw, Rhino, and Dani Luna would participate during the first two tapings.

On June 12, 2026, MLP announced that Mayhem would premiere on July 15, 2026 on TSN2 at Midnight Eastern Standard Time. On July 10, 2026, MLP announced that they had signed a streaming deal with MyAEW to air Mayhem worldwide.

On July 13, 2026, MLP announced that they would make its return to Toronto for the second annual Northern Rising pay-per-view on October 3, 2026.

On July 30, 2026, MLP announced that Adam Copeland would make his MLP debut during the event. On August 6, 2026, MLP announced that Northern Rising had sold out the Mattamy Athletic Centre and that the event would be streaming live on MyAEW. On September 3, 2026, MLP announced that Copeland would fight Steve Maclin during the event. On September 4, 2026, MLP announced that Gisele Shaw would defend the MLP Women's Canadian Championship against Nikki Storm during the event. On September 9, 2026, during the Rebel Heart edition of AEW Dynamite, Maclin attacked Copeland backstage. This footage was also aired on that night's episode of Mayhem. On September 10, 2026, it was announced that Josh Alexander would make his return to defend the MLP Canadian Championship against the interim champion Stu Grayson during the event. During the September 10, 2026 episode of Mayhem, Andrade El Idolo challenged Rohan Raja to a match at Northern Rising. On the September 16, 2026 episode of Mayhem, Priscilla Kelly defeated Gisele Shaw to become the new MLP Canadian Women's Champion.

=== Storylines ===
Northern Rising featured multiple professional wrestling matches that involved different wrestlers from pre-existing scripted feuds and storylines. Storylines were produced on various Border City Wrestling and Maple Leaf Pro Wrestling events along with MLP's television program Mayhem.

== Results ==
No.	Results	Stipulations	Times
1^{P}	Jonathan Gresham defeated Tarik and Vaughn Vertigo by pinfall	Three-way match	5:18
2^{P}	Rudra defeated Jonny DeLuca by pinfall	Singles match	4:03
3^{P}	Luigi Primo, El Reverso, and Mo Jabari defeated Johnny Parisi, Gama Singh Jr., and Michael Allen Richard Clark (with Johnny Bradford) by pinfall	Six-man tag team match	6:13
4	Máscara Dorada and Subculture (Mark Andrews and Flash Morgan Webster) defeated TJP, Johnny TV, and Gabriel Fuerza by pinfall	Six-man tag team match	12:12
5	Jody Threat and Alice Crowley defeated Kingsley and Alexia Nicole by pinfall	Tag team match	7:13
6	Psycho Mike defeated Dan Maff and Crazzy Steve by pinfall	Monster's Mayhem match	16:22
7	Andrade El Ídolo defeated Rohan Raja (with Aurora Teves) by pinfall	Singles match	14:19
8	Grizzled Young Veterans (James Drake and Zack Gibson) defeated 1st Faction (Sheldon Jean and Brent Banks) (c) (with Bryce Hansen) and Sinner and Saint (Judas Icarus and Travis Williams) by pinfall	Three-way tag team match for the MLP Canadian Tag Team Championship	13:34
9	Priscilla Kelly (c) defeated Nikki Storm by pinfall	Singles match for the MLP Canadian Women's Championship	11:50
10	Josh Alexander (lineal) (with Don Callis) defeated Stu Grayson (interim) by pinfall	Singles match to determine the Undisputed MLP Canadian Champion	24:17
11	Adam Copeland defeated Steve Maclin by pinfall	Street Fight	31:54
(c) / – the champion(s) heading into the match; P / – the match was broadcast on the pre-show
