= MLP Multiverse =

2026 professional wrestling event

Multiverse
- Promotional poster of the event
- Promotion: Maple Leaf Pro Wrestling (MLP)
- Date: April 17, 2026
- City: Las Vegas, Nevada, USA
- Venue: Palms Casino Resort

Pay-per-view chronology
← Previous; Uprising	Next → Northern Rising

Multiverse was a professional wrestling pay-per-view event produced by Canadian promotion Maple Leaf Pro Wrestling (MLP). It took place on April 17, 2026 at the Palms Casino Resort in Las Vegas, Nevada, and was part of the Palms Slam Fest.

== Production ==
=== Background ===
On February 26, 2026, it was announced by Paragon Talent Group, a talent agency owned by former WWE 24/7 Champion Mojo Rawley, that they would hold the inaugural Palms Slam Fest during WrestleMania 42 weekend from April 15-18, 2026. The event was confirmed to feature talent from Maple Leaf Pro Wrestling (MLP) with their inaugural United States show, Tokyo Joshi Pro-Wrestling (TJPW), World Wonder Ring Stardom (Stardom), Consejo Mundial de Lucha Libre, and House of Glory (HOG).

On February 26, 2026, MLP announced that they would be holding their Multiverse pay-per-view during the Palms Slam Fest conveniton. On March 17, 2026, CMLL wrestler Místico was announced to be part of the event. On April 8, 2026, MLP announced that the first match would be Steven Borden vs. Kiran Grey.

=== Storylines ===
Multiverse featured multiple professional wrestling matches that involved different wrestlers from pre-existing scripted feuds and storylines. Storylines were produced on various Border City Wrestling and Maple Leaf Pro Wrestling events.

== Results ==
No.	Results	Stipulations	Times
1	Subculture (Mark Andrews and Flash Morgan Webster) defeated Vaughn Vertigo and Guy Cool by pinfall	Tag team match	8:18
2	Steven Borden defeated Kiran Grey by pinfall	Singles match	5:54
3	The Demand (Ricochet, Bishop Kaun and Toa Liona) defeated Rich Swann, Michael Oku, and Sidney Akeem (with Amira Blair) by pinfall	Six man tag team match	12:40
4	Hechicero (c) defeated Jonathan Gresham by pinfall	Singles match for the CMLL World Heavyweight Championship	16:23
5	Paul Walter Hauser defeated Q. T. Marshall by submission	Sin City Street Fight	12:29
6	Gisele Shaw (c) defeated Killer Kelly, Shotzi Blackheart, and Persephone by pinfall	Four-way match for the MLP Canadian Women's Championship	12:21
7	Amazing Red and El Sky Team (Místico and Máscara Dorada) defeated The Rascalz (Dezmond Xavier, Zachary Wentz, and Myron Reed) by submission	Six man tag team match	11:31
(c) / – the champion(s) heading into the match
