= No Surrender (2024) =

2024 Total Nonstop Action Wrestling event

- Promotional poster
- Promotion: Total Nonstop Action Wrestling
- Date: February 23, 2024
- City: Westwego, Louisiana
- Venue: Alario Center
- Attendance: 750

TNA+ Monthly Specials chronology
← Previous; Final Resolution	Next → Sacrifice

No Surrender chronology
← Previous; 2023	Next → 2026

The 2024 No Surrender was a professional wrestling event produced by Total Nonstop Action Wrestling. It took place on February 23, 2024 at the Alario Center in Westwego, Louisiana (a suburb of New Orleans) and aired exclusively on TNA+. It was the 16th event under the No Surrender chronology.

Eleven matches were contested at the event, including two on the Countdown to No Surrender pre-show and one taped as a digital exclusive. In the main event, Mustafa Ali defeated Chris Sabin to win the TNA X Division Championship. In other prominent matches, Jordynne Grace defeated Gisele Shaw to retain the TNA Knockouts World Championship, Moose defeated Alex Shelley in a No Surrender Rules match to retain the TNA World Championship, Josh Alexander defeated Simon Gotch, and ABC (Ace Austin and Chris Bey) defeated Grizzled Young Vets (James Drake and Zack Gibson) in the final match of a best of three series to retain the TNA World Tag Team Championship.

== Production ==
Other on-screen personnel
Role:	Name:
Commentators	Tom Hannifan
Commentators	Matthew Rehwoldt
Ring announcer	Jennifer Chung
Referees	Daniel Spencer
Referees	Allison Leigh
Referees	Frank Gastineau

=== Background ===
No Surrender is an annual professional wrestling event produced by Total Nonstop Action Wrestling. It was originally produced as a pay-per-view (PPV) event. The first one was held in July 2005, but when the PPV names were shuffled for 2006, it was moved to September. In December 2012, TNA announced that the event was canceled. The last event took place in the TNA Impact! Zone in September 2012. It was resumed as a special episode of Impact Wrestling between 2013 and 2015 and was then revived as an Impact Plus event in 2019.

On December 4, 2023, TNA announced that No Surrender would take place on February 23, 2024 at the Alario Center in Westwego, Louisiana.

=== Storylines ===
The event featured several professional wrestling matches, with results predetermined by TNA. Storylines were produced on the company's weekly programs, Impact! and Xplosion.

At Hard To Kill, Gisele Shaw won an Ultimate X match to earn a TNA Knockouts World Championship match at a later date. Later in the night, Jordynne Grace would defeat Trinity to win her third Knockouts World Championship. Several weeks later on the February 1 episode of TNA Impact!, it was announced that Grace would defend the title against Shaw at No Surrender.

Also at Hard To Kill, Moose would defeat Alex Shelley to win the TNA World Championship. Later on the February 1 TNA Impact!, Shelley would confront Moose and his stable, The System (Brian Myers, Eddie Edwards, and Alisha Edwards), notifying them that he was invoking his rematch clause at No Surrender. The following week, TNA announced that the match will be held under "No Surrender Rules," where the match can only end when one of the participant's respective cornermen throw in the towel on their behalf. Moose will be cornered by Myers and Edwards of The System, while Shelley will be cornered by Intergalactic Jet Setters (Kushida and Kevin Knight).

At the end of the January 25 episode of TNA Impact!, a vignette aired signaling the TNA debut of Mustafa Ali. The following week, TNA X Division Champion Chris Sabin was having a backstage interview, only for another video by Ali to play on the monitor, making his intentions for the title clear. On February 5, TNA announced on their website that Ali will challenge Sabin for the X Division Championship at No Surrender.

At Hard To Kill, Decay (Havok and Rosemary) returned to TNA and defeated MK Ultra (Killer Kelly and Masha Slamovich) to win the TNA Knockouts World Tag Team Championship. Decay had been competing as The Death Dollz (Jessicka and Courtney Rush) for a majority of the past year before returning to their guises as Decay. Since losing the titles, MK Ultra had turned heel, viciously attacking their opponents while looking to enact their rematch clause. TNA would announce on February 13 that the rematch will take place at No Surrender.

On the February 8 episode of TNA Impact!, after Josh Alexander defeated Alan Angels, Alexander was seemingly attacked by a fan, who was later revealed to be Simon Gotch. The following week, Gotch appeared on Angel's "Sound Check" talk show, explaining that he was instrumental in Alexander signing with TNA in 2019, as he was his final opponent on the independent circuit before Scott D'Amore offered Alexander a contract. Alexander would break into the segment and attack Gotch afterward, to which TNA announced a match between the two men at No Surrender.

At Hard To Kill, former WWE tag team Grizzled Young Vets (James Drake and Zack Gibson) debuted for TNA, competing in a four-way tag team match for the TNA World Tag Team Championship, but lost out to champions ABC (Ace Austin and Chris Bey). On the January 25 episode of TNA Impact!, GYV attacked ABC after Bey's match, looking to gain another opportunity. Director of Authority Santino Marella would then make a best of three series between the two teams over the titles, with GYV winning the first match and ABC winning the second, with the third and decisive match taking place at No Surrender.

On the January 18 TNA Impact!, Frankie Kazarian turned heel by attacking Eric Young after the two had lost a tag team match, exclaiming that 2024 was to be "his year". Two weeks later, Kazarian explained his actions in the ring, saying he saved TNA when he re-signed in 2023, but after a career of simply being a "soldier" for the promotion, he vowed to be remembered as a "king," which is what he called Young. Young would challenge Kazarian to a match on the February 22 TNA Impact!, but Kazarian refused, instead sitting on the entrance ramp while sending Big Damo (Young's former Sanity stablemate in WWE) to wrestle Young in his stead. Young would get the win over Damo. Young would again challenge Kazarian to a match, this time at No Surrender. TNA would make it official, with the stipulation being that the winner would receive a TNA World Championship match at Sacrifice.

== Results ==
No.	Results	Stipulations	Times
1^{D}	Joe Hendry defeated Deaner (with A. J. Francis) by pinfall (Note: The match was taped for a TNA Digital Exclusive that aired on February 29.)	Singles match	3:54
2^{P}	The Rascalz (Trey Miguel and Zachary Wentz) defeated Speedball Mountain (Mike Bailey and Trent Seven) by submission	Tag team match	8:12
3^{P}	The System (Eddie Edwards and Brian Myers) (with Alisha Edwards) defeated Intergalactic Jet Setters (Kevin Knight and Kushida) by pinfall	Tag team match	8:47
4	Eric Young defeated Frankie Kazarian by pinfall	Singles match to determine who will challenge for the TNA World Championship at Sacrifice	9:23
5	ABC (Ace Austin and Chris Bey) (c) defeated Grizzled Young Vets (James Drake and Zack Gibson) by pinfall	Tag team match for the TNA World Tag Team Championship; This was the final match in a best of three series.	17:48
6	PCO defeated Kon by disqualification	Singles match	3:49
7	MK Ultra (Killer Kelly and Masha Slamovich) defeated Decay (Rosemary and Havok) (c) by pinfall	Tag team match for the TNA Knockouts World Tag Team Championship	7:27
8	Josh Alexander defeated Simon Gotch by pinfall	Singles match	16:43
9	Moose (c) (with The System (Eddie Edwards, Brian Myers and Alisha Edwards)) defeated Alex Shelley (with Intergalactic Jet Setters (Kevin Knight and Kushida))	No Surrender Rules match for the TNA World Championship	20:07
10	Jordynne Grace (c) defeated Gisele Shaw by pinfall	Singles match for the TNA Knockouts World Championship	10:38
11	Mustafa Ali defeated Chris Sabin (c) by pinfall	Singles match for the TNA X Division Championship	19:37
(c) / – the champion(s) heading into the match; D / – this was a dark match; P / – the match was broadcast on the pre-show
