= MLP Uprising =

2026 professional wrestling pay-per-view event

Uprising
- Promotional poster of the event
- Promotion: Maple Leaf Pro Wrestling (MLP)
- Date: March 28, 2026
- City: Windsor, Ontario, Canada
- Venue: St. Clair College Sportsplex

Pay-per-view chronology
← Previous; Global Wars Canada	Next → Multiverse

Uprising was a professional wrestling pay-per-view event promoted by Canadian promotion Maple Leaf Pro Wrestling (MLP). It took place on March 28, 2026 at the St. Clair College Sportsplex in Windsor, Ontario, Canada, and featured wrestlers from American promotion Ring of Honor (ROH).

== Production ==
=== Background ===
On January 16, 2026, ROH and MLP announced that they would present a joint Global Wars show at St. Clair College in Windsor, Ontario, Canada and that the show would air for the first time since 2017 on pay-per-view on March 27, 2026. In addition to the announcement, MLP announced that they would be holding a second event titled Uprising the on the following night on March 28, 2026. On March 27, 2026, MLP announced that they had signed a television deal with The Sports Network to air a new weekly show titled Mayhem. On the same night, MLP announced that due to Josh Alexander suffering a knee injury on an AEW Collision taping on March 18, 2026 that the MLP Canadian Championship would be vacated and that a new champion would be crowned on Uprising.

=== Storylines ===
Uprising featured multiple professional wrestling matches that involved different wrestlers from pre-existing scripted feuds and storylines. Storylines were produced on various Border City Wrestling and Maple Leaf Pro Wrestling events.

== Results ==
No.	Results	Stipulations	Times
1^{D}	Gama Singh Jr. defeated London Lightning by pinfall	Singles match	—
2	Máscara Dorada and Bhupinder Gujjar defeated Jake Crist and Michael Allen Richard Clarke by pinfall	Tag team match	11:02
3	Alice Crowley and Evil Uno defeated Taylor Rising and Kris Chambers by pinfall	Mixed tag team match	8:50
4	The Swirl (Blake Christian and Lee Johnson) defeated El Reverso and Mo Jabari by pinfall	Tag team match	11:34
5	Kaito Kiyomiya defeated Bishop Dyer by pinfall	Singles match	12:58
6	Daisuke Sasaki defeated Bryce Hansen by pinfall	No Disqualification match	8:12
7	Brent Banks and Sheldon Jean defeated The Good Brothers (Doc Gallows and Karl Anderson) (c) by pinfall	Tag team match for the MLP Canadian Tag Team Championship	11:00
8	Gisele Shaw (c) defeated Deonna Purrazzo by pinfall	Singles match for the MLP Women’s Canadian Championship	17:28
9	Stu Grayson defeated Jay Lethal, Michael Oku, Rich Swann, Rohan Raja (with Aurora Teves), and Jonathan Gresham by pinfall	Elimination gauntlet match for the Interim MLP Canadian Championship	36:15
(c) / – the champion(s) heading into the match; D / – this was a dark match
