= Steven Borden =

American professional wrestler (born 1992)

- Borden in August 2026

Personal information
- Born: Steven Borden; 1992 (age 33–34) Atlanta, Georgia, U.S.
- Education: Southwestern Assemblies of God University; Kilgore College; University of Kentucky
- Father: Sting

Professional wrestling career
- Ring name: Steven Borden
- Trained by: Adam Copeland; Cash Wheeler; Darby Allin; Dax Harwood; Fred Rosser; Nick Dinsmore
- Debut: October 3, 2025

Steven Borden is an American professional wrestler. He is signed to All Elite Wrestling (AEW), where he performs under his real name.

A second-generation wrestler, he is the son of Sting.

== Early life ==
Borden was born in Atlanta, Georgia. He attended Santa Clarita Christian School in California, where he played American football as a linebacker, quarterback, and receiver, as well as playing basketball. He then attended Waxahachie High School in Texas, where he played football for the Waxahachie Indians as a defensive end, earning first-team all-district honors.

Borden attended Southwestern Assemblies of God University, where he played football for the Nelson Lions as a defensive end. He then attended Kilgore College, playing for the Kilgore Rangers as a tight end. In January 2013, he enrolled in the University of Kentucky, playing for the Kentucky Wildcats as a tight end. During the 2015 NFL draft, Borden attended a rookie mini-camp for the Kansas City Chiefs, but was not offered a contract.

== Professional wrestling career ==
=== All Elite Wrestling (2024–present) ===
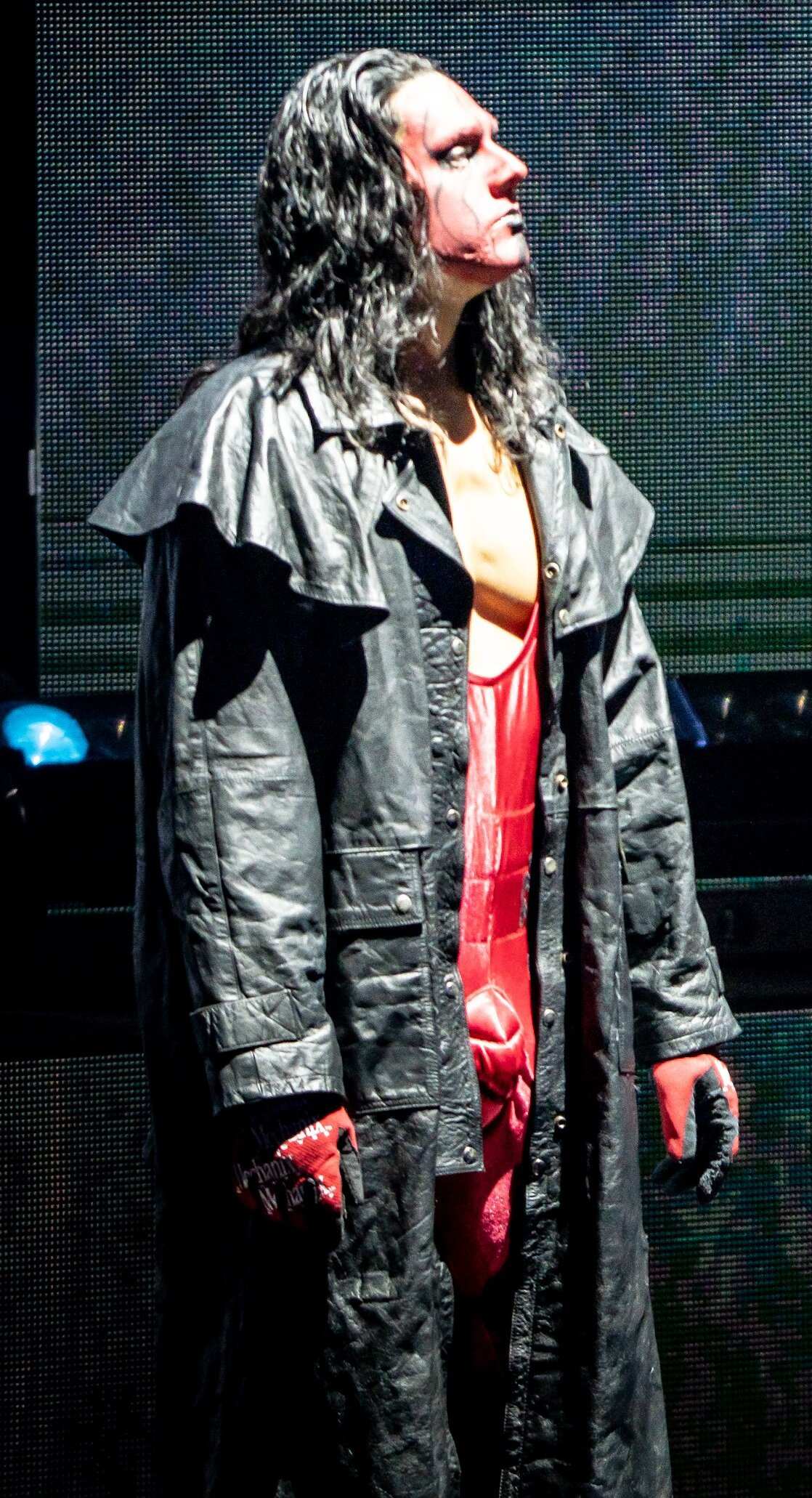
Borden, dressed as his father Sting in his nWo Wolfpac persona, at AEW Revolution in 2024

Along with his brother Garrett, Borden made his first professional wrestling appearance for All Elite Wrestling (AEW) on the February 7, 2024, episode of Dynamite, celebrating his father Sting and Darby Allin winning the AEW World Tag Team Championship. The celebration was interrupted by an attack from the Young Bucks. On March 3 at Revolution, Borden and Garrett accompanied their father for his retirement match. Borden wore Sting's nWo Wolfpac attire from the late 1990s, while Garrett wore his "Surfer" attire from the late 1980s and early 1990s. During the match, the brothers entered the ring and delivered Stinger Splashes to Sting's opponents, the Young Bucks.

By May 2024, Borden had begun training as a professional wrestler under Darby Allin and Nick Dinsmore. He also received additional training from Adam Copeland, Fred Rosser, and FTR (Cash Wheeler and Dax Harwood). In December 2025, Borden began competing in dark matches for AEW.

In August 2026, Borden began appearing on AEW television. On August 30 at All In, he and Sting helped Darby Allin fend off the Don Callis Family during Allin's AEW TNT Championship match against Kevin Knight. Borden made his televised in-ring debut on September 9 at the Rebel Heart special episode of Dynamite, teaming with Allin to defeat Don Callis Family members Josh Alexander and Mark Davis. On September 26 at All Out, Borden and Allin lost to Kyle Fletcher and Knight via doctor stoppage after Borden suffered a legitimate injury during the match. After a month of being out of action, Borden would make his return to TV on the October 21, 2026 episode of Dynamite. On November 4, Borden competed in a six-on-six Blood and Guts match at the event of the same name, where his team was defeated.

=== Independent circuit (2025–present) ===
On October 3, 2025, Borden made his in-ring debut when he teamed up with JD Drake in a loss to Allin and Killer Kross in a tag team match at Awesome Championship Wrestling's (ACW) 52W Hardway event. On November 21, Borden competed in his first singles match, where he defeated Kiran Grey during DEFY Wrestling's Aeon pay-per-view. On April 17, 2026, Borden defeated Grey in a rematch at Maple Leaf Pro Wrestling (MLP)'s Multiverse pay-per-view.

=== New Japan Pro-Wrestling (2026) ===
On March 21, 2026, Borden made his debut for New Japan Pro-Wrestling (NJPW) at the NJPW Academy 3rd Anniversary Showcase event, which took place at the NJPW LA Dojo in Carson, California. Teaming with Allan Breeze, Borden defeated Hitt and Vin Parker.

== Championships and accomplishments ==
- Pro Wrestling Illustrated
  - Ranked no. 430 out of the top 500 singles wrestlers in the PWI 500 in 2026
