= Zack Gibson =

British professional wrestler (born 1990)

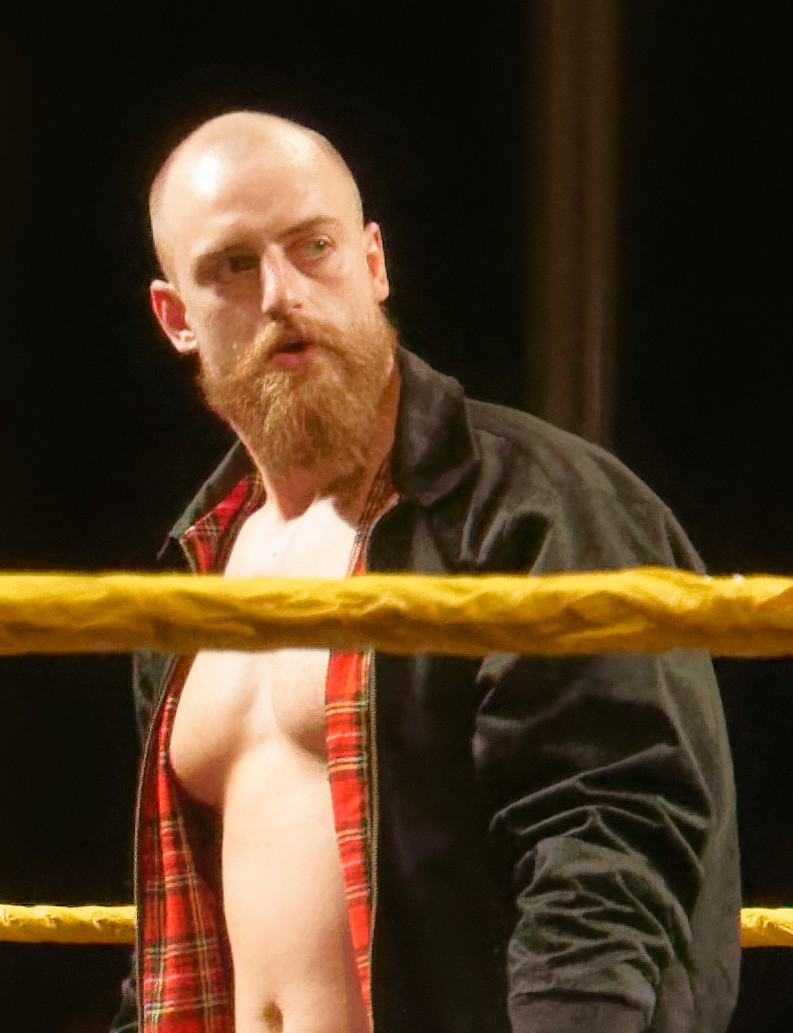
- Gibson in 2018

Personal information
- Born: Jack Rea; 8 August 1990 (age 36) Liverpool, Merseyside, England

Professional wrestling career
- Ring name(s): Zack Diamond; Zack Diamond Gibson; Zack Gibson; Rip Fowler
- Billed height: 6 ft 3 in (190 cm)
- Billed weight: 220 lb (100 kg)
- Billed from: Liverpool, England
- Trained by: Alex Shane; Andy Baker
- Debut: 2009

Jack Rea (born 8 August 1990), better known by the ring name Zack Gibson, is an English professional wrestler and promoter. He is signed to All Elite Wrestling (AEW), where he is one-half of Grizzled Young Veterans with James Drake. He also performs for its sister promotion Ring of Honor (ROH) and on the independent circuit. He is also known for his time with WWE, where he performed on the NXT UK and NXT brands. Since 2024, Gibson and Drake run a wrestling promotion called Burning Heart Pro Wrestling.

Rea began his professional wrestling career in 2009 after being trained by Alex Shane. He would compete in various promotions including FutureShock Wrestling, Grand Pro Wrestling, 5 Star Wrestling, and WhatCulture Pro Wrestling/Defiant Wrestling. In Progress Wrestling, he formed a tag team called Grizzled Young Veterans with James Drake and won the Progress tag team championship. He also wrestled in Insane Championship Wrestling and Revolution Pro Wrestling. In 2018, Gibson joined WWE's NXT UK brand after competing, where he and Drake became the inaugural NXT UK Tag Team Champions. They later transitioned to NXT in 2020 and competed in the Dusty Rhodes Tag Team Classic, where they became runners-up. Rea left WWE in 2023 after his contract expired, and began performing as a freelancer.

== Early life ==
Jack Rea was born in Liverpool on 8 August 1990. He grew up in nearby Maghull, where he attended Deyes High School. He graduated from Liverpool John Moores University in 2011 with a degree in accounting and finance. Rea played football during his youth, and worked as an accountant during the early stages of his professional wrestling career.

== Professional wrestling career ==
=== Independent circuit (2009–2019, 2023–present) ===
After being trained by Alex Shane, Rea made his pro-wrestling debut in 2009 for English promotion, FutureShock Wrestling as Zack Diamond. For FSW, he would become a three-time FSW Heavyweight Champion in a series of matches with Noam Dar, Jack Gallagher, Andy Wild, Rampage Brown, Fabian Aichner, Ashton Smith and others.

In March 2010, Rea started using the ring name of Zack Gibson. Gibson entered the FutureShock Trophy Tournament 2011 making it to the finals only to lose to CJ Banks. In 2010, Rea made his debut for Grand Pro Wrestling as Zack Diamond losing to Jack Gallagher. Diamond became GPW British Champion after defeating former champion CJ Banks, Gallagher and Martin Kirby in a four-way scramble match. A year later after his GPW debut, Diamond teamed with Xander Cooper, Mikey Whiplash and Danny Hope where they defeated Gallagher, Bruce Sheila, William Gaylord and Noam Dar. At GPW Heroes & Villains, Diamond lost the championship to Jack Gallagher. In 2015, Gibson unsuccessfully challenged Kid Fite for the Union of European Wrestling Alliances European Cruiserweight Championship for Infinite Promotions.

In 2016, Gibson made his debut for 5 Star Wrestling, losing to Big Damo. In 2018, before the promotion's closure, Gibson made his return to 5 Star losing to Rey Mysterio by disqualification after hitting Mysterio with a low blow.

In March 2017 Gibson made his debut for WhatCulture Pro Wrestling (later Defiant Wrestling) as part of the Pro Wrestling World Cup English qualifiers, losing to Jimmy Havoc in the first round. He began wrestling on Defiant's weekly program Loaded in late 2017 into 2018. He defeated Rampage Brown at the 18 February 2018 event Chain Reaction. His final match for the promotion before leaving for WWE, would be in March 2018, with Gibson losing a Magnificent 7 qualifying match.

=== Progress Wrestling (2012, 2014–2019, 2024) ===
In 2012, Gibson made his Progress Wrestling debut at the debut show for Progress. In 2014, Gibson returned to Progress at Chapter Twelve, defeating Will Ospreay. In 2017, Gibson and James Drake formed villainous a tag team called Grizzled Young Veterans. Grizzled Young Veterans defeated Chris Brookes and Kid Lykos of CCK to become the Progress tag team champions. They successfully defended the titles against Aussie Open at Progress Chapter 59. At Chapter 61, Grizzled Young Veterans defeated Moustache Mountain (Trent Seven and Tyler Bate)to retain their championships. In 2018, Gibson took part of the Super Strong Style 16 Tournament, defeating Joey Janela in the first round and Pete Dunne by disqualification in the quarter finals before he was eliminated by Kassius Ohno in the semi-finals.

=== Insane Championship Wrestling (2015–2017) ===
Gibson debuted for Insane Championship Wrestling in 2015 during the Road to Fear and Loathing tour losing an eight-man tag team match to the New Age Kliq. In 2015, he challenged Grado for the ICW World Heavyweight Championship in a three-way match with Dave Mastiff where Grado retained.

On 20 November 2016 at ICW: Fear & Loathing IX, Gibson entered the Seven Man Stairway to Heaven match for the ICW Zero-G Championship, he faced Aaron Echo, Lionheart, Liam Thomson, Iestyn Rees and Kenny Williams but was first eliminated.

In 2017 at ICW:Fear & Loathing X, Gibson and Rob Van Dam were defeated by Lionheart in a three-way elimination match. On 16 June 2017 Gibson defeated Kenny Williams in a falls count anywhere match to win the ICW Zero-G Championship. Gibson lost the championship back to Williams the following month in a ladder match.

=== Revolution Pro Wrestling (2017–2018, 2023–2024) ===
Gibson was defeated by Trent Seven in his Revolution Pro Wrestling (RevPro) debut match. At RevPro Epic Encounter 2017, Gibson was defeated by Hirooki Goto. In June, Gibson defeated Angélico. At Summer Sizzler, Gibson defeated Dalton Castle. Gibson took part of RevPro and New Japan Pro-Wrestling's joint show, Global Wars UK losing to Yuji Nagata on night one and Toru Yano on night two. Gibson and Josh Bodom defeated Aussie Open to become number one contenders for the RevPro Undisputed British Tag Team Championships. Gibson and Bodom lost to RevPro tag team champions, Moustache Mountain.

=== WWE ===
==== NXT UK (2018–2020) ====
Gibson was announced for WWE's WrestleMania Axxess during WrestleMania 34 weekend as part of a WWE United Kingdom Championship invitational where he lost to Mark Andrews in the first round. On day four of axxess, Grizzled Young Veterans retained their Progress tag team championships by disqualification against Heavy Machinery (Tucker Knight and Otis Dozovic). Around this time, it was revealed by Wrestling Observer that Gibson was signed to a WWE contract.

On 16 May 2018, it was announced that Gibson would be one of the 16 participants in the upcoming WWE United Kingdom Championship Tournament with the winner of the tournament facing Pete Dunne for the United Kingdom Championship. Gibson defeated Amir Jordan in the opening round. He would go on to defeat Gentleman Jack Gallagher and Flash Morgan Webster in the second round and semi-finals, respectively. He would then defeat Travis Banks in the finals and would go on to challenge WWE United Kingdom Champion, Pete Dunne, the next night in a losing effort.

In 2019, they defeated Moustache Mountain at NXT UK TakeOver: Blackpool in the finals of a tournament to become the inaugural NXT UK Tag Team Champions. After some defences, they would lose the titles to Mark Andrews and Flash Morgan Webster at NXT Takeover: Cardiff in a triple-threat tag team also involving Gallus. On 11 September Drake and Gibson unsuccessfully challenged Andrews and Webster in a rematch. They would have another title match at NXT UK Takeover: Blackpool II against the new champions Gallus, Andrews & Webster and Imperium (Fabian Aichner and Marcel Barthel) in a ladder match where the champions retained.

In parallel to their NXT UK Tag Team Championship pursuit at NXT UK TakeOver: Blackpool II, Drake and Gibson competed in the 2020 Dusty Rhodes Tag Team Classic. They defeated Kushida and Alex Shelley in the quarterfinals and NXT Tag Team Champions Bobby Fish and Kyle O'Reilly of The Undisputed Era in the semifinals, before losing to The BroserWeights (Matt Riddle and Pete Dunne) in the finals.

==== NXT (2020–2023) ====
On 19 February 2020 episode of NXT, the Grizzled Young Veterans joined the NXT brand, defeating Raul Mendoza and Joaquin Wilde before announcing their intent to take over NXT's tag team division, establishing themselves as tweeners. At the Dusty Rhodes tag team classic The Grizzled Young Veterans got to the finals before losing to MSK. At NXT TakeOver: Stand & Deliver The Grizzled Young Veterans were defeated by MSK for the vacant NXT Tag Team Championship also involving Legado Del Fantasma. On 21 July episode of NXT The Grizzled Young Veterans defeated LA Knight and Cameron Grimes. On 19 July 2022 edition of NXT, Drake and Gibson were revealed as Joe Gacy's Dyad, being renamed to Jagger Reid and Rip Fowler, respectively. On 14 October 2023, both Drake and Gibson announced that their WWE contracts have expired and they would take independent bookings.

=== Return to independent circuit (2023–present) ===
On 14 October 2023, both Gibson and Drake announced that they would take independent bookings. The following day, they made their first independent appearance since being released at Deadlock Pro-Wrestling's Live 3 event where they answered an open challenge set by DPW's tag team champions, The Workhorsemen.

On 25 April 2024, Gibson and Drake announced the launch of their professional wrestling promotion, Burning Heart Wrestling. The promotion's first event will take place on 21 June.

=== Total Nonstop Action Wrestling (2024) ===
On 26 December 2023, it was revealed that Gibson and Drake will make their TNA Wrestling debuts at Hard To Kill. They were later announced as challenging for the TNA World Tag Team Championship, along with The Rascalz (Zachary Wentz and Trey Miguel) and Speedball Mountain (Mike Bailey and Trent Seven), against champions ABC (Chris Bey and Ace Austin), which was won by ABC. Director of Authority Santino Marella would then make a best of three series between the two teams over the titles, with GYV winning the first match and ABC winning the second. GYV lost the third and decisive match at No Surrender.

=== All Elite Wrestling / Ring of Honor (2024–present) ===
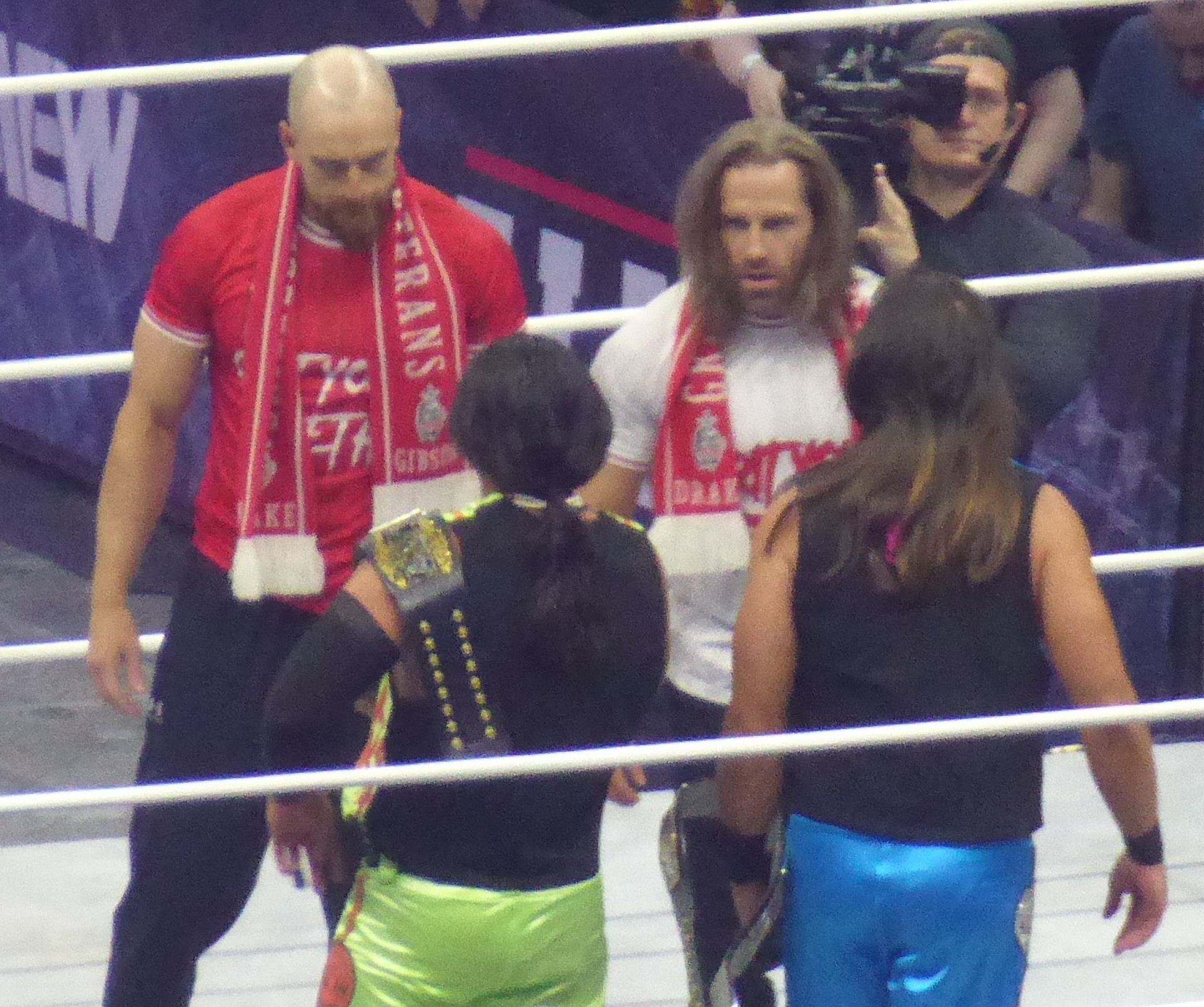
The Grizzled Young Veterans (rear) confronting the Young Bucks at All In in August 2024

Gibson and Drake made their All Elite Wrestling debut on the 27 April 2024 episode of Collision, losing to The Acclaimed (Anthony Bowens and Max Caster). At All In on 25 August 2024, the Grizzled Young Veterans made their return to AEW and stared down AEW World Tag Team Champions the Young Bucks (Matt Jackson and Nick Jackson) before attacking FTR (Cash Wheeler and Dax Harwood). Grizzled Young Veterans made their debut for AEW's sister promotion Ring of Honor on 14 November in a four-way tag. Grizzled Young Veterans then began a feud with FTR, which ended in a defeat for Grizzled Young Veterans on the 12 December episode of Collision.

=== New Japan Pro-Wrestling (2024–present) ===
The Grizzled Young Veterans made their New Japan Pro-Wrestling on 30 August 2024 at Capital Collision, losing a three-way tag team match to Tomohiro Ishii and Hiroshi Tanahashi to determine the #1 contenders to the Strong Openweight Tag Team Championship. On 8 November at Fighting Spirit Unleashed, Grizzled Young Veterans defeated TMDK (Mikey Nicholls and Shane Haste) to win the Strong Openweight Tag Championships, only to lose it to West Coast Wrecking Crew a month later at Strong Style Evolved.

=== Maple Leaf Pro Wrestling (2026-present) ===
On October 3, 2026 at Maple Leaf Pro Wrestlings pay-per-view event Northern Rising as The Grizzled Young Veterans (Zack Gibson and James Drake) defeated 1st Faction (Sheldon Jean and Brent Banks) (with Bryce Hansen) and Sinner and Saint (Judas Icarus and Travis Williams) to become the new MLP Canadian Tag Team Championships in a Three-way tag team match.

== Personal life ==
Rea is a lifelong supporter of Liverpool F.C. and fan of The Beatles. He named his submission hold, and signature and finishing moves to reference both respectively: a kimura lock called the Shankly Gates, a spinebuster called Helter Skelter and an over-the-shoulder double knee facebreaker called the Ticket to Ride.

== Championships and accomplishments ==
- Attack! Pro Wrestling
  - Attack! 24:7 Championship (1 time) – with Sam Bailey
- Burning Heart Pro Wrestling
  - Burning Heart Pro Tag Team Championship (1 time) – with James Drake
- Britannia Wrestling Promotions
  - One Night Tournament (2011)
  - PWI: BWP World Catchweight Championship (1 time)
- Deadlock Pro-Wrestling
  - DPW Worlds Tag Team Championship (1 time) – with James Drake
- FutureShock Wrestling
  - FSW Championship (3 times)
  - FSW Tag Team Championship (1 time) – with James Drake
  - FSW Trophy Tournament 2015 winner (1 time)
  - Lotto-Thunder Tournament 2013 winner (1 time)
- Grand Pro Wrestling
  - GPW British Championship (2 times)
  - 2018 Thunderbrawl Winner
- Insane Championship Wrestling
  - ICW Zero-G Championship (1 time)
- Maple Leaf Pro Wrestling
  - MLP Canadian Tag Team Championship (1 time, current) – with James Drake
- New Generation Wrestling
  - NGW Tag Team Championship (1 time) – with Sam Bailey
- New Japan Pro-Wrestling
  - Strong Openweight Tag Team Championship (1 time) – with James Drake
- Over the Top Wrestling
  - OTT Tag Team Championship (1 time) – with Charlie Sterling and Sha Samuels
- Progress Wrestling
  - Progress Tag Team Championship (3 times) – with James Drake
- Pro Wrestling Illustrated
  - Ranked No. 207 of the top 500 singles wrestlers in the PWI 500 in 2019
- The Wrestling Revolver
  - Revolver World Tag Team Championship (1 time) – with James Drake
- WWE
  - NXT UK Tag Team Championship (1 time, inaugural) – with James Drake
  - NXT UK Tag Team Championship Tournament (2019)
  - United Kingdom Championship Tournament (2018)
