= MLP Canadian Tag Team Championship =

Canadian Men's Tag Team professional wrestling championship

Details
- Promotion: Maple Leaf Pro Wrestling (MLP)
- Date established: March 28, 2026
- Current champions: Grizzled Young Veterans (Zack Gibson and James Drake)
- Date won: October 3, 2025
Statistics
- First champions: The Good Brothers (Doc Gallows and Karl Anderson)
- Most reigns: The Good Brothers (Doc Gallows and Karl Anderson), 1st Faction (Brent Banks and Sheldon Jean) & Grizzled Young Veterans (Zack Gibson and James Drake) (all 1 reign)
- Longest reign: 1st Faction (Brent Banks and Sheldon Jean) (189 days)
- Shortest reign: The Good Brothers (Doc Gallows and Karl Anderson) (1 day)

The MLP Canadian Tag Team Championship is a men's tag team professional wrestling championship created and promoted by Independent Canadian professional wrestling company Maple Leaf Pro Wrestling (MLP). The current champions are Grizzled Young Veterans (James Drake and Zack Gibson), who are in their first reign as a team and individually. They won the titles by defeating defending champions 1st Faction (Sheldon Jean and Brent Banks) and Sinner and Saint (Judas Icarus and Travis Williams) at Northern Rising in Toronto, Ontario, Canada, on October 3, 2026.

== History ==
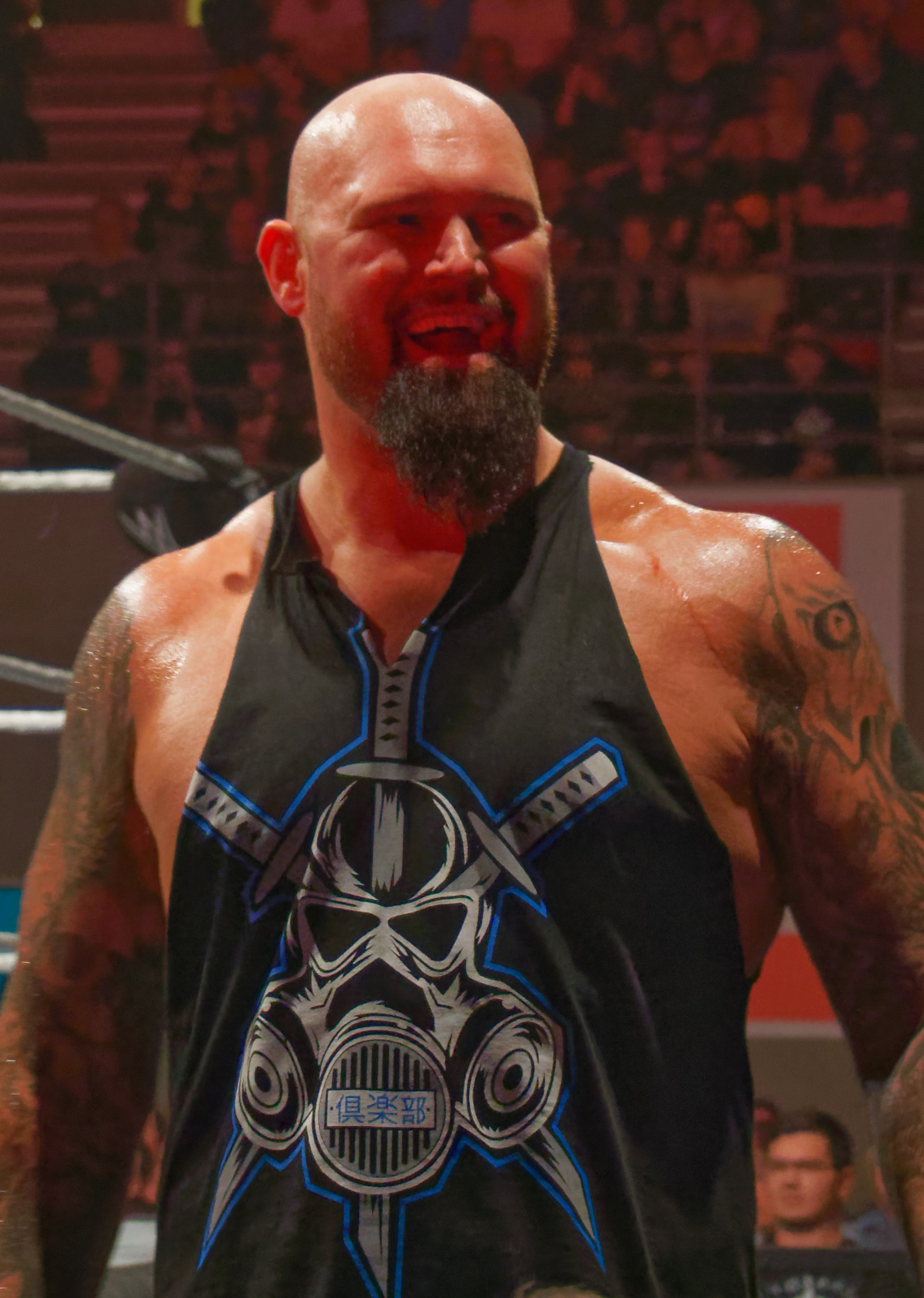
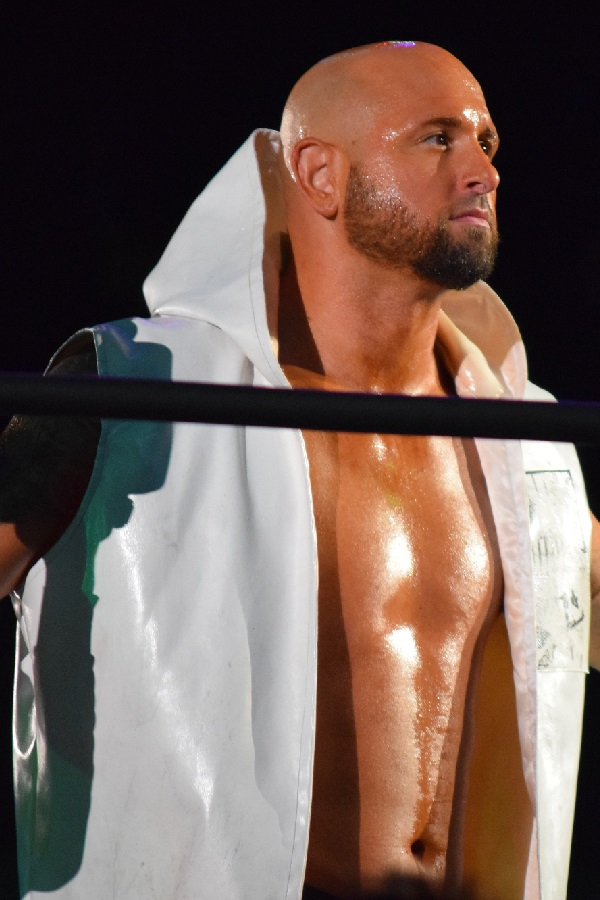
Inaugural champions The Good Brothers (Doc Gallows and Karl Anderson)

On March 27, 2026 at Ring of Honor’s Global Wars Canada, The Good Brothers (Doc Gallows and Karl Anderson) defeated Kaito Kiyomiya and Bishop Dyer, GOA (Bishop Kaun and Toa Liona), and Bryce Hanson and Sheldon Jean in a four-way tag team match to become the inaugural MLP Canadian Tag Team Champions.

== Reigns ==
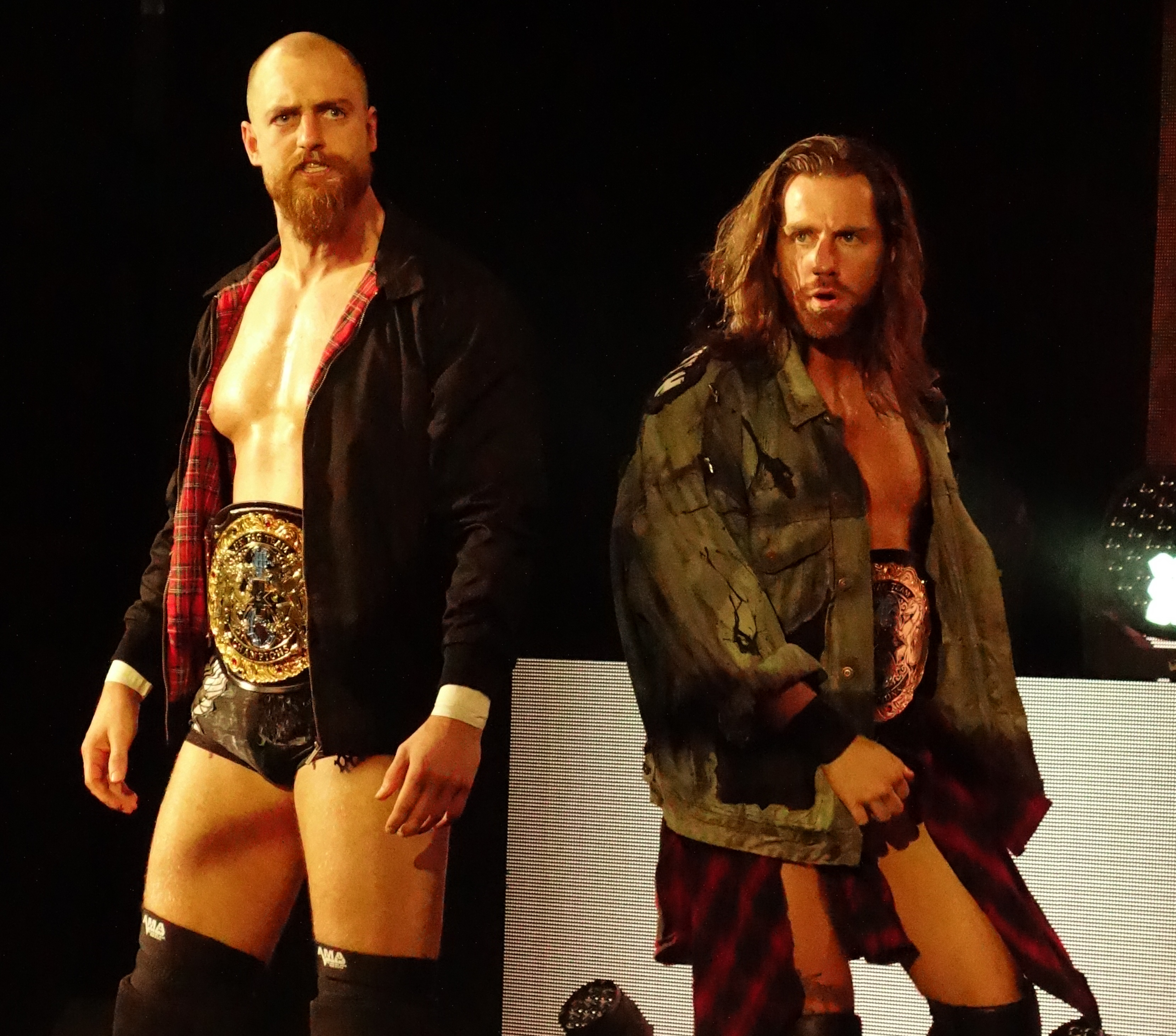
Current champions Grizzled Young Veterans (Zack Gibson (left) and James Drake (right))

As of October 6, 2026.

Key
No.	Overall reign number
Reign	Reign number for the specific champion
Days	Number of days held
+	Current reign is changing daily

No.	Champion	Championship change			Reign statistics		Notes	Ref.
No.	Champion	Date	Event	Location	Reign	Days	Notes	Ref.
1	The Good Brothers (Doc Gallows and Karl Anderson)	March 27, 2026	Global Wars Canada	Windsor, Ontario, Canada	1	1	Defeated Kaito Kiyomiya and Bishop Dyer, GOA (Bishop Kaun and Toa Liona), and Bryce Hanson and Sheldon Jean via pinfall in a four-way tag team match to become the inaugural champions.	
2	1st Faction (Sheldon Jean and Brent Banks)	March 28, 2026	MLP Uprising	Windsor, Ontario, Canada	1	189		
3	Grizzled Young Veterans (James Drake and Zack Gibson)	October 3, 2026	Northern Rising	Toronto, Ontario, Canada	1	3+	This was a three-way tag team match also involving Sinner and Saint (Judas Icarus and Travis Williams).	
