= Grizzled Young Veterans =

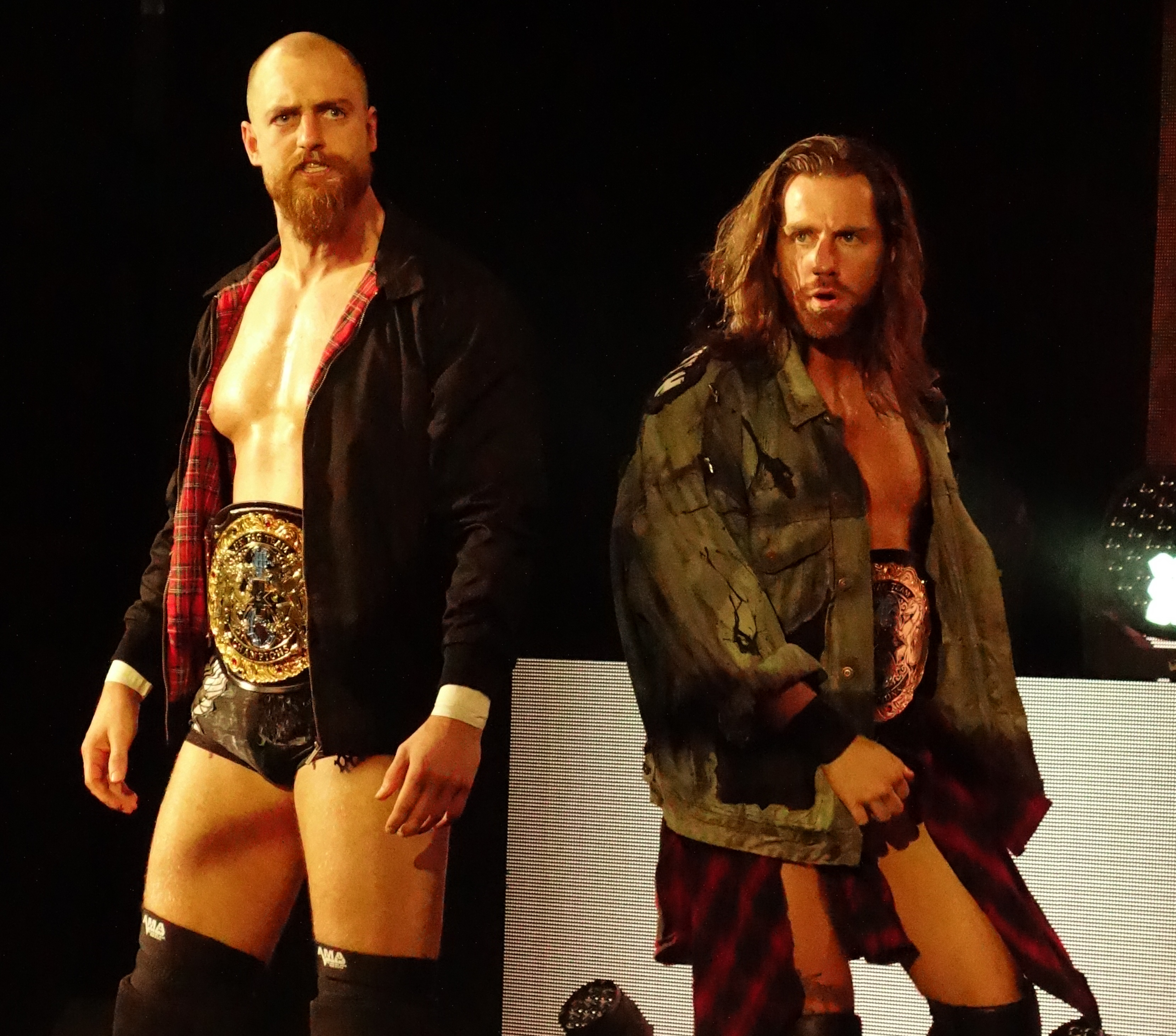
- Grizzled Young Veterans (Zack Gibson (left) and James Drake (right)) in 2019 with the NXT UK Tag Team Championship

Tag team
- Members: James Drake / Jagger Reid; Zack Gibson / Rip Fowler
- Name(s): James Drake and Zack Gibson; Grizzled Young Veterans; The Dyad
- Billed heights: Drake: 5 ft 11 in (1.80 m); Gibson: 6 ft 3 in (1.91 m)
- Combined billed weight: 401 lb (182 kg)
- Billed from: England
- Debut: July 30, 2017
- Years active: 2017–present

Grizzled Young Veterans (also shortened as GYV) are an English professional wrestling tag team consisting of James Drake and Zack Gibson. Drake and Gibson primarily work as freelancers – predominantly for Ring of Honor (ROH).

They previously wrestled in WWE, where they are the inaugural NXT UK Tag Team Champions, and later renamed as The Dyad on the NXT brand. They won numerous titles in their native England, being three-time Progress Tag Team Champions, and holding the Revolution Pro Wrestling (RevPro) Undisputed British Tag Team Championship once. They are now the current Maple Leaf Pro Wrestling Canadian Tag team Champion. They also run their own promotion in the UK called Burning Heart Pro Wrestling, launched in 2024.

== History ==
=== Progress Wrestling (2017–2019) ===
In 2017, Zack Gibson and James Drake formed a villainous tag team called Grizzled Young Veterans. Grizzled Young Veterans defeated Chris Brookes and Kid Lykos of CCK to become the Progress Tag Team Champions. They successfully defended the titles against Aussie Open at Progress Chapter 59. At Chapter 61, Grizzled Young Veterans defeated Moustache Mountain (Tyler Bate & Trent Seven) to retain their championships. In 2018, Gibson took part of the Super Strong Style 16 Tournament, defeating Joey Janela in the first round and Pete Dunne by disqualification in the quarter finals before he was eliminated by Kassius Ohno in the semi-finals.

=== WWE (2018–2023) ===
==== NXT UK (2018–2020) ====
In January 2017, Drake participated in the WWE United Kingdom Championship Tournament to crown the inaugural WWE United Kingdom Champion, losing to Joseph Conners in the first round.

Gibson was announced for WWE's WrestleMania Axxess during Wrestlemania 34 weekend as part of a WWE United Kingdom Championship invitational where he lost to Mark Andrews in the first round. On day four of Axxess, Grizzled Young Veterans retained their Progress Tag Team championships via disqualification against Heavy Machinery. Around this time, it was revealed by Wrestling Observer that Gibson was signed to a WWE contract. Both would participate in the WWE United Kingdom Championship Tournament with the winner facing Pete Dunne for the United Kingdom Championship. Drake lost to Flash Morgan Webster in the first round, but Gibson won the tournament after defeating Travis Banks in the finals and would go on to challenge Dunne the next night in a losing effort.

In 2019, they defeated Moustache Mountain at NXT UK TakeOver: Blackpool in the finals of a tournament to become the inaugural NXT UK Tag Team Champions. After some defenses, they would lose the titles to Mark Andrews and Flash Morgan Webster at NXT UK TakeOver: Cardiff in a triple threat tag team match also involving Gallus. On September 11, Drake and Gibson unsuccessfully challenged Andrews & Webster in a rematch. They would have another title match at NXT UK Takeover: Blackpool II against the new champions Gallus, Andrews & Webster and Imperium in a ladder match where the champions retained.

In parallel to their NXT UK Tag Team Championship pursuit at NXT UK TakeOver: Blackpool II, Drake and Gibson competed in the 2020 Dusty Rhodes Tag Team Classic. They defeated Kushida and Alex Shelley in the quarterfinals and NXT Tag Team Champions Bobby Fish and Kyle O'Reilly of The Undisputed Era in the semifinals, before losing to The BroserWeights (Matt Riddle and Pete Dunne) in the finals.

==== Arrival in NXT (2020–2022) ====
On the February 19, 2020, episode of NXT, the Grizzled Young Veterans joined the NXT brand as tweeners, defeating Raul Mendoza and Joaquin Wilde before announcing their intent to take over NXT's tag team division. However the two would soon disappear from television as a result of travel issues from the COVID-19 pandemic. The two returned on the 25 November episode of NXT, attacking Ever-Rise. In early January 2021, the Grizzled Young Veterans took part in the 2021 Dusty Rhodes Tag Team Classic where they defeated Ever-Rise in the first round, the team of Kushida and Leon Ruff in the second round, and Timothy Thatcher and Tommaso Ciampa in the semi-finals, earning the opportunity to face MSK in the finals at NXT TakeOver: Vengeance Day. At the event, the Grizzled Young Veterans were defeated by MSK, once again failing to win in the tournament finals. On the 21 December episode of NXT, they faced The Creed Brothers (Brutus Creed and Julius Creed) which ended in a no-contest when both teams got into a brawl with Kushida and Ikemen Jiro (wrestling as the tag team Jacket Time) who were on commentary as well as Josh Briggs and Brooks Jensen. In January 2022, the Grizzled Young Veterans took part in the 2022 Men's Dusty Rhodes Tag Team Classic where they defeated Chase University (Andre Chase and Bodhi Hayward) in the first round, but lost to The Creed Brothers in the semifinals.

==== Schism (2022–2023) ====
On 19 July episode of NXT, Joe Gacy's masked allies were revealed to have been James Drake and Zack Gibson, now under the ring names Jagger Reid and Rip Fowler, officially renaming the tag team "The Dyad" and turning heel once again. Gacy and the Dyad subsequently named their group "Schism". Schism gained an additional member on the 25 October episode of NXT, which was revealed to be Ava Raine. The Dyad would fail to win the NXT Tag Team Championship from Gallus on the April 18 episode of NXT in a triple-threat match involving the Creed Brothers and on the May 9 episode of NXT. On the July 4 episode of NXT, the Dyad defeated the Creeds in a loser leaves town match. However, the Creeds would defeat the Dyad in a steel cage match on August 29, being reinstated with NXT in the process; it was Reid and Fowler's last match in WWE. On the September 12 edition of NXT, Gacy confirmed Fowler and Reid were no longer members of Schism in a pre-taped vignette. On September 14, Reid and Fowler departed WWE after their contracts expired.

=== Independent circuit (2023–present) ===
On 14 October 2023, both Drake and Gibson announced that they would take independent bookings. The following day, they made their first independent appearance since being released at Deadlock Pro-Wrestling's Live 3 event where they answered an open challenge set by DPW's tag team champions, The Workhorsemen. During their still-ongoing tenure with DPW, the duo would dethrone Violence is Forever to claim the DPW World Tag Tag Titles, successfully defending them against the likes of Miracle Generation.

On April 25, 2024, Drake and Gibson announced the launch of their professional wrestling promotion, Burning Heart Wrestling. The promotion's first event took place on June 21.

=== Total Nonstop Action Wrestling (2024) ===
In January 2024, the Grizzled Young Veterans debuted in Total Nonstop Action Wrestling at the pay-per-view Hard To Kill, challenging for the TNA World Tag Team Championship, along with The Rascalz (Zachary Wentz and Trey Miguel) and Speedball Mountain (Mike Bailey and Trent Seven), against champions ABC (Chris Bey and Ace Austin), which was won by ABC. Director of Authority Santino Marella would then make a best of three series between the two teams over the titles, with the Grizzled Young Veterans winning the first match and ABC winning the second. The Grizzled Young Veterans lost the third and decisive match at No Surrender.

=== All Elite Wrestling / Ring of Honor (2024–present) ===
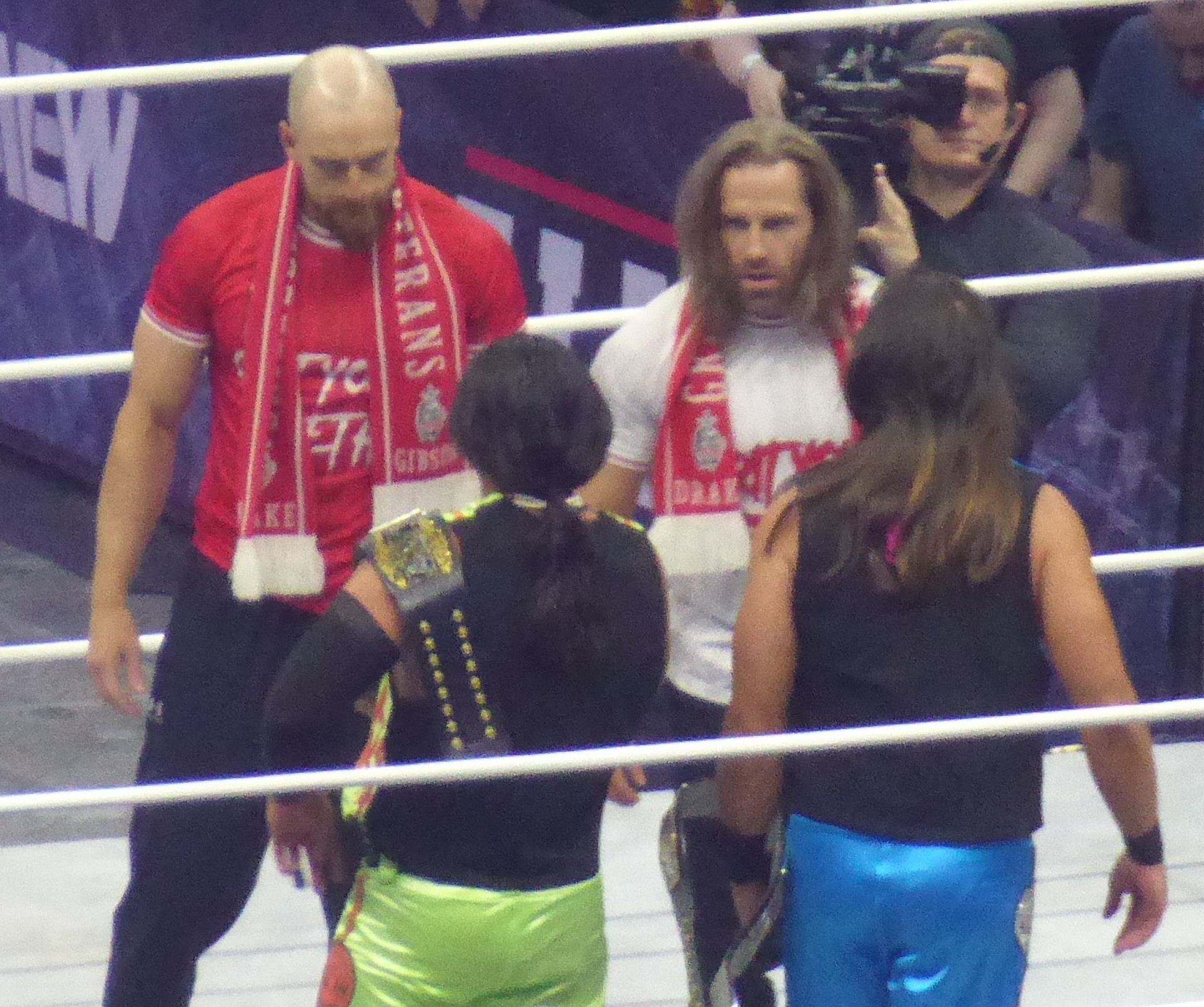
The Grizzled Young Veterans (rear) confronting the Young Bucks at All In in August 2024

The Grizzled Young Veterans made their All Elite Wrestling debut on the April 27, 2024 episode of Collision, losing to The Acclaimed (Anthony Bowens and Max Caster). At All In on August 25, 2024, the Grizzled Young Veterans made their return to AEW and stared down AEW World Tag Team Champions the Young Bucks (Matt Jackson and Nick Jackson) before attacking FTR (Cash Wheeler and Dax Harwood). Grizzled Young Veterans made their debut for AEW's sister promotion Ring of Honor on November 14 in a four-way tag. Grizzled Young Veterans then began a feud with FTR, which ended in a defeat for Grizzled Young Veterans on the December 12 episode of Collision.

=== New Japan Pro-Wrestling (2024–present) ===
The Grizzled Young Veterans made their New Japan Pro-Wrestling on August 30, 2024 at Capital Collision, losing a three-way tag team match to Tomohiro Ishii and Hiroshi Tanahashi to determine the #1 contenders to the Strong Openweight Tag Team Championship. On November 8 at Fighting Spirit Unleashed, Grizzled Young Veterans defeated TMDK (Mikey Nicholls and Shane Haste) to win the Strong Openweight Tag Championships, only to lose it to West Coast Wrecking Crew a month later at Strong Style Evolved.

=== Maple Leaf Pro Wrestling (2026-present) ===
On October 3, 2026 at Maple Leaf Pro Wrestlings pay-per-view event Northern Rising The Grizzled Young Veterans (James Drake and Zack Gibson) defeated 1st Faction (Sheldon Jean and Brent Banks) (with Bryce Hansen) and Sinner and Saint (Judas Icarus and Travis Williams) to win the MLP Canadian Tag Team Championships in a Three-way tag team match.

== Championships and accomplishments ==
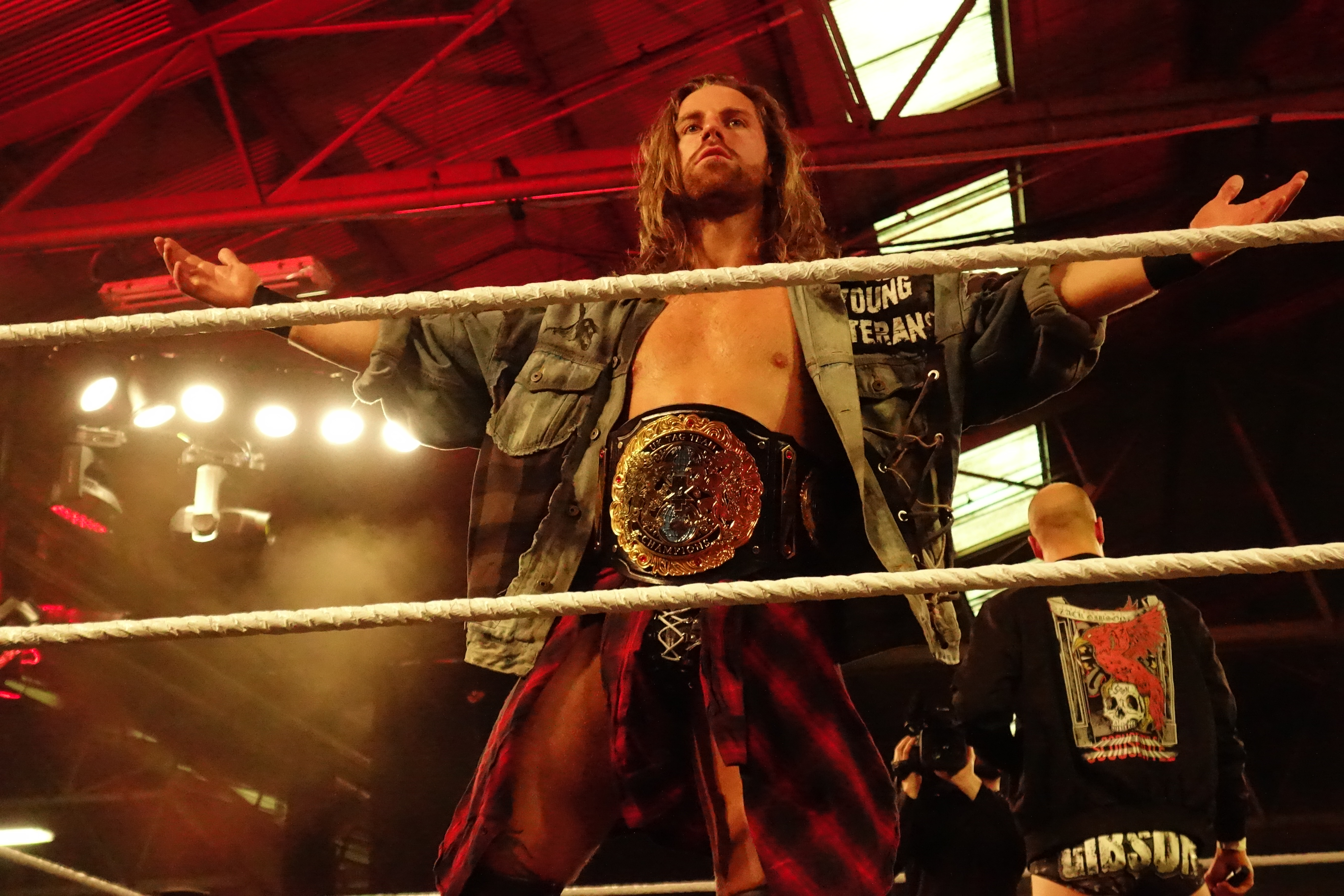
Drake as NXT UK Tag Team Champion

- Burning Heart Pro Wrestling
  - Burning Heart Pro Tag Team Championship (1 time)
- Deadlock Pro-Wrestling
  - DPW Worlds Tag Team Championship (1 time)
- FutureShock Wrestling
  - FSW Tag Team Championship (1 time)
- Maple Leaf Pro Wrestling
  - MLP Canadian Tag Team Championship (1 time, current)
- New Japan Pro-Wrestling
  - Strong Openweight Tag Team Championship (1 time)
- Progress Wrestling
  - Progress Tag Team Championship (3 times)
- Pro Wrestling Illustrated
  - PWI ranked Drake #205 of the top 500 singles wrestlers in the PWI 500 in 2019
  - PWI ranked Gibson #207 of the top 500 singles wrestlers in the PWI 500 in 2019
  - No. 81 of the top 100 tag teams in the PWI Tag Team 100 in 2023
- Revolution Pro Wrestling
  - Undisputed British Tag Team Championship (1 time)
- The Wrestling Revolver
  - PWR Tag Team Championship (1 time)
- WWE
  - NXT UK Tag Team Championship Tournament (2019)
  - NXT UK Tag Team Championship (1 time, inaugural)
  - United Kingdom Championship Tournament (2018) – Gibson
