= James Drake (wrestler) =

British professional wrestler (born 1993)

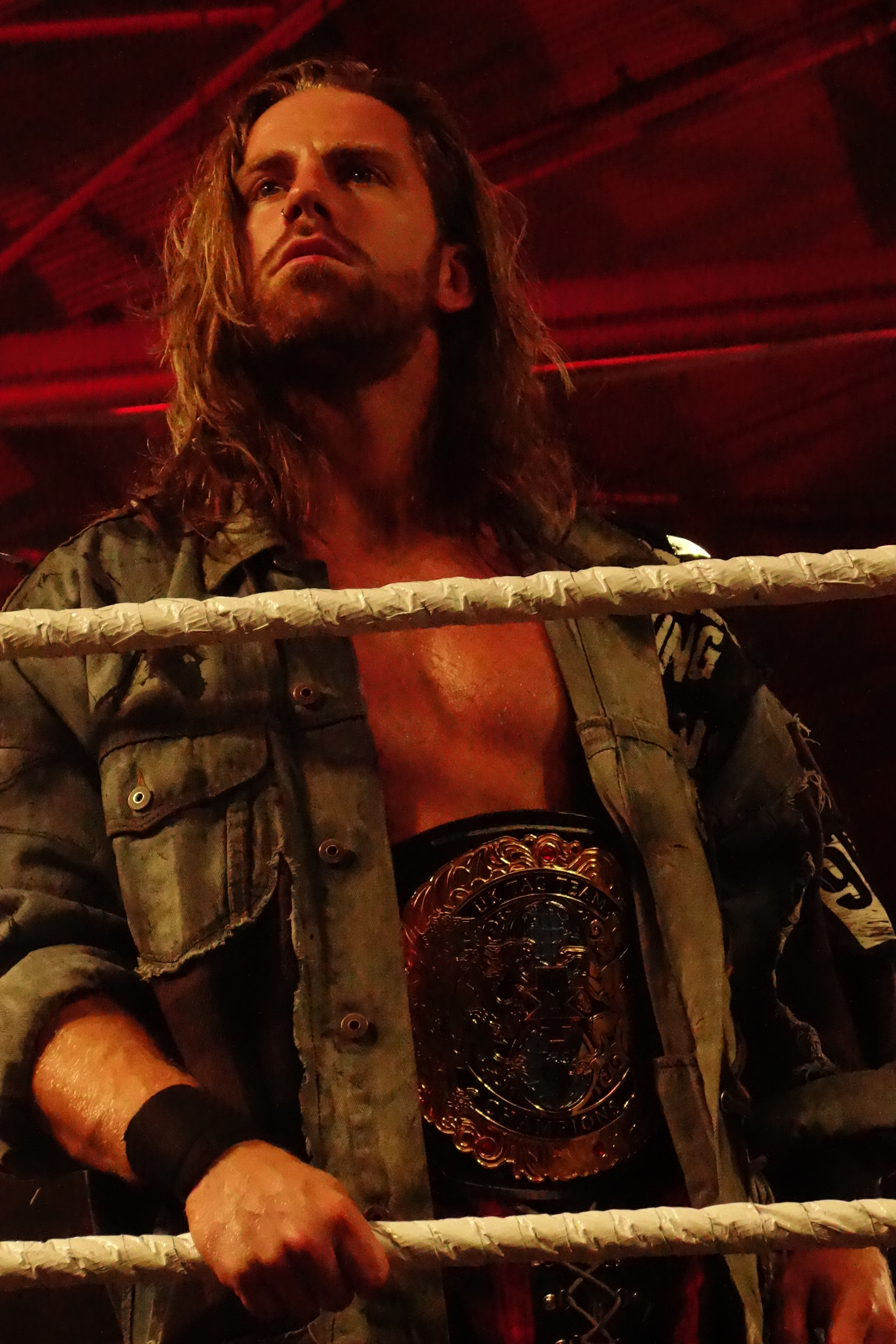
- Drake in April 2019

Personal information
- Born: James Dowell; 4 March 1993 (age 33) Blackpool, Lancashire, England

Professional wrestling career
- Ring name(s): James Drake; JD Sassoon; Jagger Reid
- Billed height: 5 ft 10 in (1.78 m)
- Billed weight: 181 lb (82 kg)
- Billed from: Blackpool, England
- Debut: 2010

James Dowell (born 4 March 1993), better known under the ring name James Drake, is an English professional wrestler and promoter. He is signed to All Elite Wrestling (AEW), where he is one-half of Grizzled Young Veterans with Zack Gibson. He also performs for its sister promotion Ring of Honor (ROH) and on the independent circuit. He is best known for his time in WWE, where he performed on the NXT UK and NXT brands.

In 2017, Drake formed the tag team Grizzled Young Veterans with Jack Rea, best known as Zack Gibson, becoming the inaugural NXT UK Tag Team Champions and three-time Progress Tag Team Champions. Dowell and Rea run a wrestling promotion called Burning Heart Pro Wrestling.

== Professional wrestling career ==
=== Progress Wrestling (2016–2019, 2024) ===
In 2017, Drake and Zack Gibson formed a villainous tag team called Grizzled Young Veterans in Progress Wrestling. Grizzled Young Veterans defeated Chris Brookes and Kid Lykos of CCK to become the Progress tag team champions. They successfully defended the titles against Aussie Open (Kyle Fletcher and Mark Davis) at Progress Chapter 59. At Chapter 61, Grizzled Young Veterans defeated Moustache Mountain (Tyler Bate and Trent Seven) to retain their championships.

=== WWE ===
==== NXT UK (2017–2020) ====
In January 2017, Drake participated in the WWE United Kingdom Championship Tournament to crown the inaugural WWE United Kingdom Champion, losing to Joseph Conners in the first round. On 12 January 2019 Drake and Gibson defeated Moustache Mountain in a tournament final at NXT UK's debut TakeOver event in Blackpool, to become the inaugural NXT UK Tag Team Champions. Grizzled Young Veterans would defend their titles against, Oney Lorcan and Danny Burch, Amir Jordan and Kenny Willams, & Moustache Mountain before losing it to Mark Andrews and Flash Morgan Webster at NXT UK Takeover: Cardiff in a triple-threat tag team also involving Gallus. On the 11 September episode of NXT UK, Grizzled Young Veterans unsuccessfully challenged Andrews & Webster in a rematch. On the 7 November episode of NXT UK, during the Grizzled Young Veterans match against Andrews and Webster, Gallus and Imperium interfered. On the 28 November episode of NXT UK, Grizzled Young Veterans and Andrews & Webster interfered during Gallus' title match against Imperium and Grizzled Young Veterans took the titles and ran but the general managers came and announced that Gallus would defend their titles at NXT UK Takeover: Blackpool II against Grizzled Young Veterans, Andrews & Webster and Imperium for the titles in a ladder match. At the event, Grizzled Young Veterans lost the match. Grizzled Young Veterans also competed in the 2020 Dusty Rhodes Classic and they defeated Kushida and Alex Shelley in the quarterfinals and NXT Tag Team Champions the Undisputed Era in the semifinals due to a distraction by Imperium.

==== NXT (2020–2023) ====
On the 19 February 2020 episode of NXT, the Grizzled Young Veterans joined the NXT brand, defeating Raul Mendoza and Joaquin Wilde before announcing their intent to take over NXT's tag team division, establishing themselves as tweeners. At the Dusty Rhodes Tag Team Classic, The Grizzled Young Veterans made it all the way to the finals before losing to MSK. At NXT Takeover: Stand & Deliver, The Grizzled Young Veterans were defeated by MSK for the vacant NXT Tag Team Championship also involving Fantasma. On the 3 August 2021 edition of NXT, The Grizzled Young Veterans defeated LA Knight and Cameron Grimes. On the 19 July 2022 edition of NXT, him and Zack Gibson were revealed as Joe Gacy's Dyad, being renamed to Jagger Reid and Rip Fowler, respectively. On 14 October 2023, both Drake and Gibson announced that their WWE contracts have expired and they would take independent bookings.

=== Independent circuit (2023–present) ===
On 14 October 2023, both Drake and Gibson announced that they would take independent bookings. The following day, they made their first independent appearance since being released at Deadlock Pro-Wrestling's Live 3 event where they answered an open challenge set by DPW's tag team champions, The Workhorsemen.

On 25 April 2024, Drake and Gibson announced the launch of their professional wrestling promotion, Burning Heart Wrestling. The promotion's first event will take place on 21 June.

=== Total Nonstop Action Wrestling (2024) ===
On 26 December 2023, it was revealed that Gibson and Drake will make their TNA Wrestling debuts at Hard To Kill. They were later announced as challenging for the TNA World Tag Team Championship, along with The Rascalz (Zachary Wentz and Trey Miguel) and Speedball Mountain (Mike Bailey and Trent Seven), against champions ABC (Chris Bey and Ace Austin), which was won by ABC. Director of Authority Santino Marella would then make a best of three series between the two teams over the titles, with GYV winning the first match and ABC winning the second. GYV lost the third and decisive match at No Surrender.

=== All Elite Wrestling (2024–present) ===
On 25 April 2024, it was revealed that Gibson and Drake will make their All Elite Wrestling Debut on the 27 April episode of Collision, where they were defeated by The Acclaimed (Anthony Bowens & Max Caster).

At All In on 25 August, Drake and Gibson made their return to AEW and stared down AEW World Tag Team Champions The Young Bucks (Nicholas Jackson and Matthew Jackson) before attacking FTR (Cash Wheeler and Dax Harwood), officially establishing the two as heels for the company. Grizzled Young Veterans made their debut for AEW's sister promotion Ring of Honor on 14 November in a four-way tag. Grizzled Young Veterans then began a feud with FTR, which ended in a defeat for Grizzled Young Veterans on the 12 December episode of Collision.

=== New Japan Pro-Wrestling (2024–present) ===
The Grizzled Young Veterans made their New Japan Pro-Wrestling on 30 August 2024 at Capital Collision, losing a three-way tag team match to Tomohiro Ishii and Hiroshi Tanahashi to determine the #1 contenders to the Strong Openweight Tag Team Championship. On 8 November at Fighting Spirit Unleashed, Grizzled Young Veterans defeated TMDK (Mikey Nicholls and Shane Haste) to win the Strong Openweight Tag Championships, only to lose it to West Coast Wrecking Crew a month later at Strong Style Evolved.

=== Maple Leaf Pro Wrestling (2026-present) ===
On October 3, 2026 at Maple Leaf Pro Wrestlings pay-per-view event Northern Rising as The Grizzled Young Veterans (James Drake and Zack Gibson) defeated 1st Faction (Sheldon Jean and Brent Banks) (with Bryce Hansen) and Sinner and Saint (Judas Icarus and Travis Williams) to become the new MLP Canadian Tag Team Championships in a Three-way tag team match.

== Championships and accomplishments ==
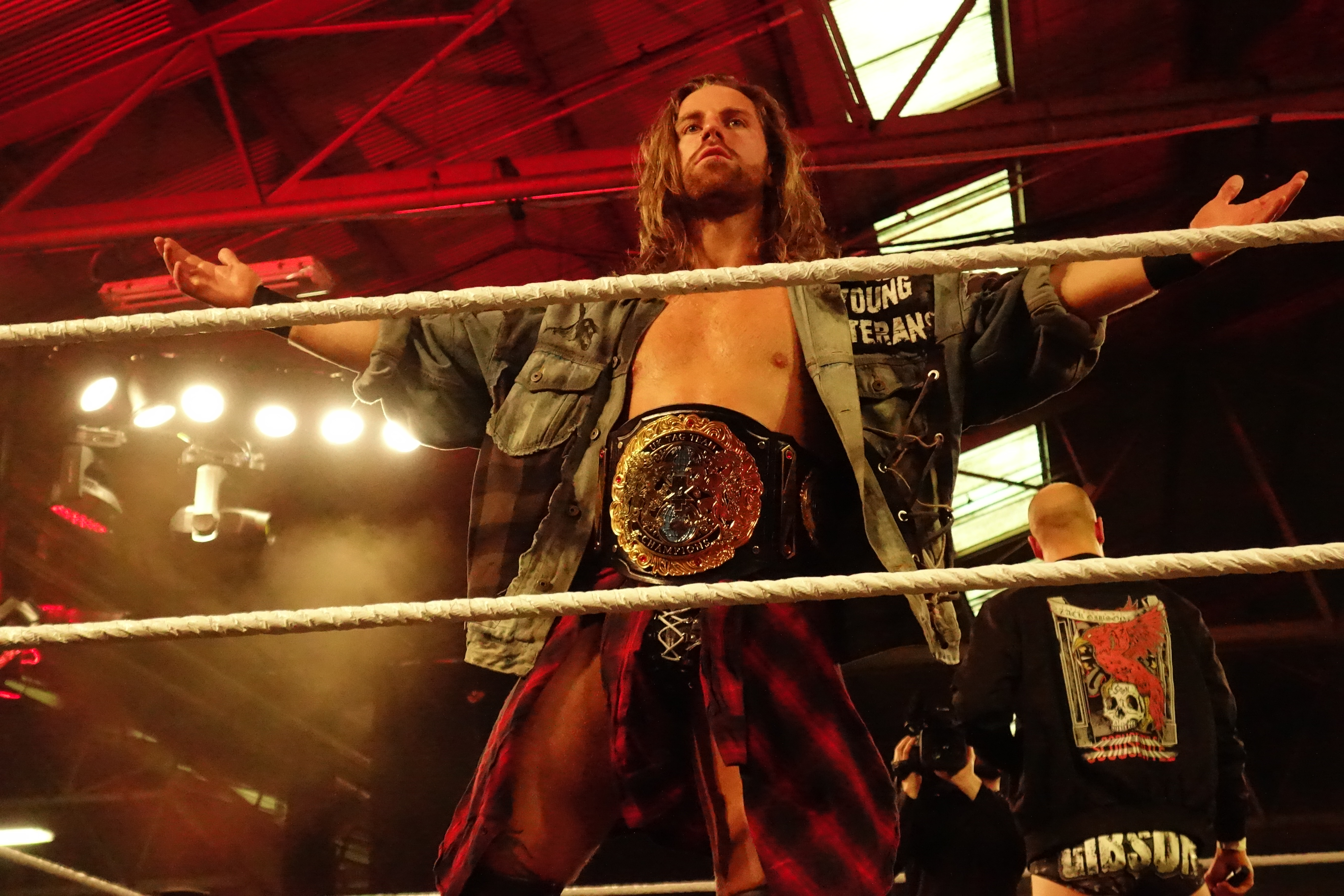
Drake as NXT UK Tag Team Champion

- Attack! Pro Wrestling
  - Attack! 24:7 Championship (1 time)
- Britannia Wrestling Promotions
  - BWP Tag Team Championship (1 time) – with Axl Rage
- Burning Heart Pro Wrestling
  - Burning Heart Pro Tag Team Championship (1 time) – with Zack Gibson
- Deadlock Pro-Wrestling
  - DPW Worlds Tag Team Championship (1 time) – with Zack Gibson
- FutureShock Wrestling
  - FSW Adrenaline Championship (1 time)
  - FSW Tag Team Championship (2 times) – with Axl Rage (1) and Zack Gibson (1)
  - Lotto-Thunder Tournament (2017)
- Grand Pro Wrestling
  - GPW Heavyweight Championship (1 time) – with Dave Rayne, Axl Rage, Sean Daniels and Zack Diamond
- Maple Leaf Pro Wrestling
  - MLP Canadian Tag Team Championship (1 time, current) – with Zack Gibson
- New Japan Pro-Wrestling
  - Strong Openweight Tag Team Championship (1 time) – with Zack Gibson
- Progress Wrestling
  - Progress Tag Team Championship (3 times) – with Zack Gibson
- Pro Wrestling Chaos
  - King Of Chaos Championship (1 time)
- Pro Wrestling Illustrated
  - Ranked No. 205 of the top 500 singles wrestlers in the PWI 500 in 2019
- Revolution Pro Wrestling
  - Undisputed British Tag Team Championship (1 time) – with Zack Gibson
- The Wrestling Revolver
  - Revolver World Tag Team Championship (1 time) – with Zack Gibson
- WWE
  - NXT UK Tag Team Championship (1 time, inaugural) – with Zack Gibson
