= Strong Style Evolved (2024) =

2024 New Japan Pro-Wrestling professional wrestling event

- Promotional poster featuring various NJPW wrestlers
- Promotion: New Japan Pro-Wrestling
- Brand: NJPW Strong
- Date: December 15, 2024
- City: Long Beach, California, USA
- Venue: Walter Pyramid
- Attendance: 2,435

Event chronology
← Previous; Antonio Inoki Memorial Show	Next → Wrestle Kingdom 19

Strong Style Evolved chronology
← Previous; 2022	Next → —

Strong Style Evolved was a professional wrestling event promoted by New Japan Pro-Wrestling (NJPW). The event took place on December 15, 2024, at the Walter Pyramid, in Long Beach, California, USA.

== Production ==
=== Background ===
The show features professional wrestling matches that result from scripted storylines, where wrestlers portray villains, heroes, or less distinguishable characters in the scripted events that build tension and culminate in a wrestling match or series of matches.

== Results ==
No.	Results	Stipulations	Times
1	Zane Jay defeated Matt Vandagriff by submission	STRONG Survivor match	13:26
2	Mina Shirakawa defeated Johnnie Robbie by pinfall	Singles match	7:18
3	West Coast Wrecking Crew (Jorel Nelson and Royce Isaacs) defeated Grizzled Young Veterans (James Drake and Zack Gibson) (c) by pinfall	Tag team match for the Strong Openweight Tag Team Championship	12:43
4	TJP defeated Clark Connors, Kushida and Kosei Fujita by pinfall	Four-way match	10:27
5	Hechicero defeated Lio Rush by pinfall	Singles match	11:28
6	United Empire (Jakob Austin Young and Templario) defeated Los Ingobernables de Japon (Hiromu Takahashi and Titán) by pinfall	Tag team match	10:33
7	Gabe Kidd (c) defeated Ryohei Oiwa by pinfall	Singles match for the Strong Openweight Championship	14:35
8	TMDK (Zack Sabre Jr., Shane Haste, and Bad Dude Tito) defeated Dirty Work (Fred Rosser and Tom Lawlor) and Shota Umino	Six-man tag team match	16:46
9	Konosuke Takeshita and Jack Perry defeated Los Ingobernables de Japón (Shingo Takagi and Yota Tsuji) by pinfall	Tag team match	17:43
10	Mercedes Moné (c) defeated Hazuki by pinfall	Singles match for the Strong Women's Championship	26:34
(c) / – the champion(s) heading into the match
