= Good Brothers (professional wrestling) =

Professional wrestling tag team

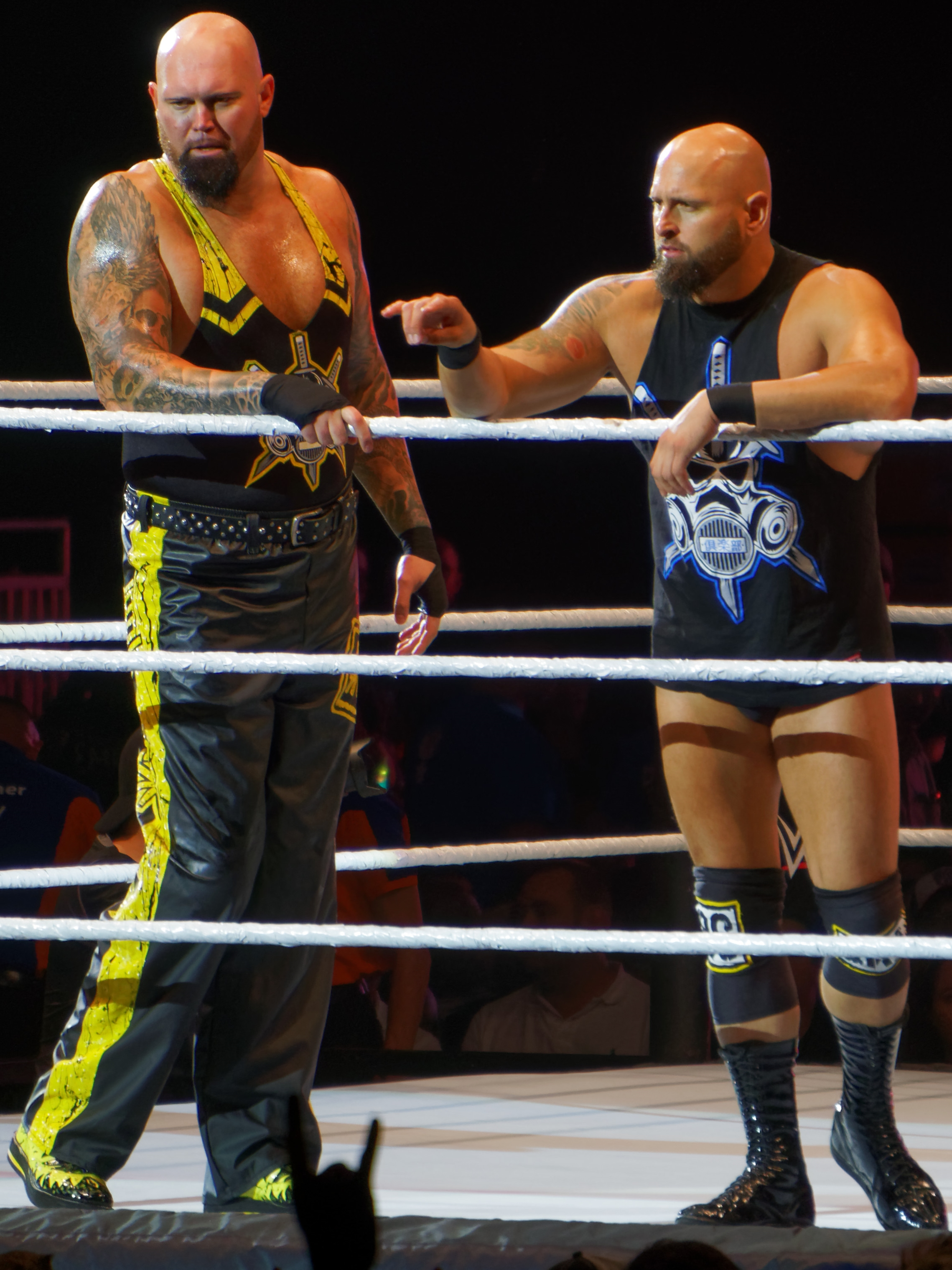
- The Good Brothers, Gallows (left) and Anderson (right), in September 2016

Tag team
- Name(s): Bullet Club; Doc Gallows and Karl Anderson; Luke Gallows and Karl Anderson; The Good Brothers; Gun(s) and Gallows; The O.C.
- Members: Doc Gallows/Luke Gallows; Karl Anderson
- Billed heights: Gallows: 6 ft 8 in (2.03 m); Anderson: 6 ft 1 in (1.85 m)
- Combined billed weight: 505 lb (229 kg)
- Billed from: "By way of Tokyo"
- Debut: November 23, 2013
- Years active: 2013–present

The Good Brothers are an American professional wrestling tag team consisting of Doc Gallows and Karl Anderson. They currently perform as freelancers – predominantly for Pro Wrestling Noah and Major League Wrestling (MLW), where they are the current MLW World Tag Team Champions in their first reign. They are best known for their time in New Japan Pro-Wrestling (NJPW), and WWE, where they performed under the team name Luke Gallows and Karl Anderson.

First put together in 2013 as part of the Bullet Club stable, they worked in New Japan Pro-Wrestling (NJPW). They also worked as a tag team in the United States for Ring of Honor (ROH) and various promotions on the independent circuit. In NJPW, they are three-time IWGP Tag Team Champions, and the winners of the 2013 World Tag League. In February 2016, the two left NJPW to sign with WWE as Luke Gallows and Karl Anderson, where they became two-time Raw Tag Team Champions, and the winners of the WWE Tag Team World Cup. In 2020, the two were released from WWE as part of budget cuts relating to the COVID-19 pandemic, and joined Impact Wrestling, upon which the once-informal moniker of the "Good Brothers" became their official team name, and winning three Impact World Tag Team Championships during their tenure there. They left Impact in 2022 and returned to WWE that October until their release in February 2025.

== History ==
=== New Japan Pro-Wrestling (2013–2016) ===
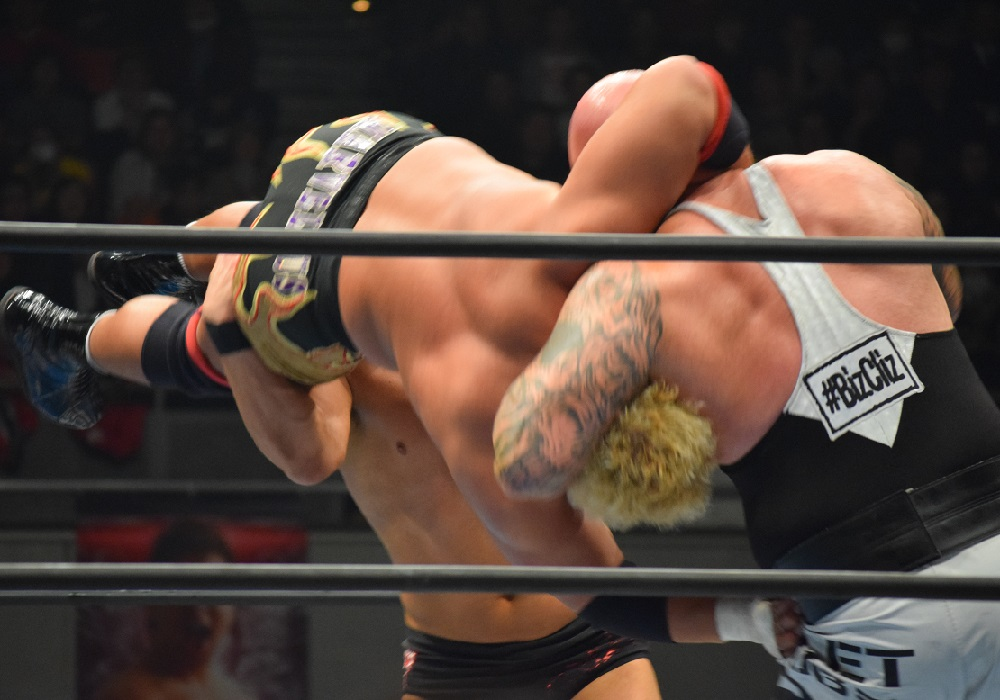
Gallows and Anderson performing the Magic Killer on Togi Makabe

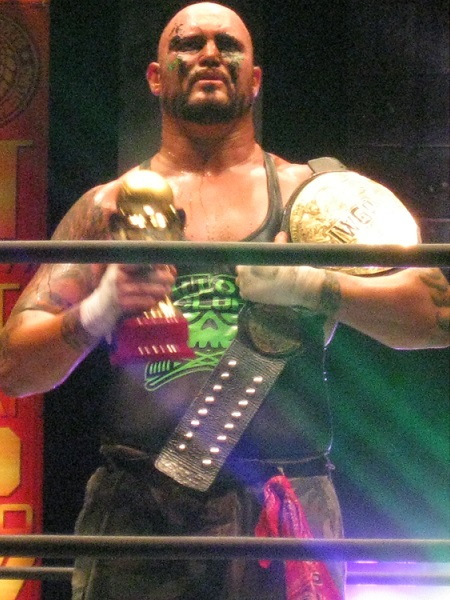
Doc Gallows as one half of the IWGP Tag Team Champions

On November 11, 2013, New Japan Pro-Wrestling (NJPW) announced the participating teams in the 2013 World Tag League. Included was a team representing the Bullet Club stable, made up of founding member Karl Anderson and the debuting Doc Gallows. Anderson had been working for NJPW regularly since 2008, while Gallows, a former WWE performer, had most recently worked for Total Nonstop Action Wrestling (TNA). The two ended up winning their block with a record of four wins and two losses, and on December 8, first defeated Togi Makabe and Tomoaki Honma in the semifinals and then Hiroyoshi Tenzan and Satoshi Kojima in the finals to win the tournament. This led to a match on January 4, 2014, at Wrestle Kingdom 8 in Tokyo Dome, where they defeated K.E.S. (Davey Boy Smith Jr. and Lance Archer) to win the IWGP Tag Team Championship. Anderson and Gallows ended up holding the title for a full year, successfully defending it six times. In December 2014, the two made it to the finals of their second consecutive World Tag League, but were defeated there by Hirooki Goto and Katsuyori Shibata. who then went on to defeat them for IWGP Tag Team Championship on January 4, 2015, at Wrestle Kingdom 9 in Tokyo Dome.

On February 11 at The New Beginning in Osaka, Anderson and Gallows defeated Goto and Shibata in a rematch to regain the IWGP Tag Team Championship. Their second reign ended on April 5 at Invasion Attack 2015, where they were defeated by The Kingdom (Matt Taven and Michael Bennett) in their first defense. Anderson and Gallows won the title for a third time on July 5 at Dominion 7.5 in Osaka-jo Hall by defeating The Kingdom in a rematch. After a six-month reign that saw Anderson and Gallows successfully defend the title once, they lost the title to 2015 World Tag League winners Togi Makabe and Tomoaki Honma on January 4, 2016, at Wrestle Kingdom 10 in Tokyo Dome.

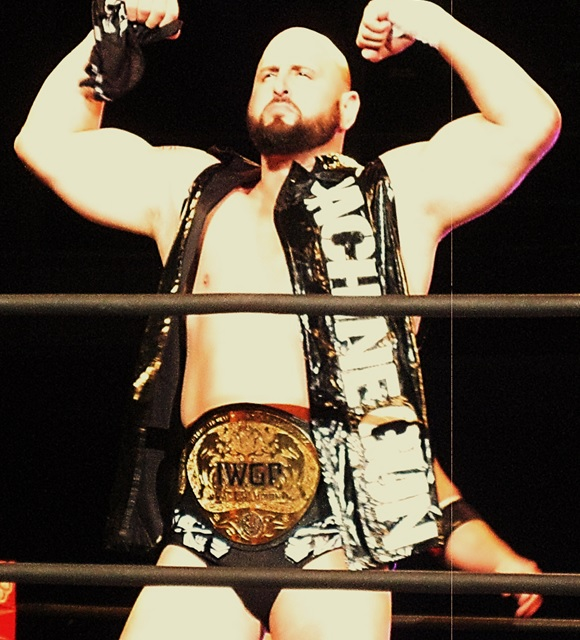
Karl Anderson as one half of the IWGP Tag Team Champions

In the midst of rumors they were leaving NJPW, Anderson and Gallows received a rematch for the IWGP Tag Team Championship, but were again defeated by Makabe and Honma on February 14 at The New Beginning in Niigata. Anderson and Gallows wrestled their final NJPW match on February 20 at Honor Rising: Japan 2016, where they teamed with their Bullet Club stablemates Bad Luck Fale and Tama Tonga in an eight-man tag team match, where they were defeated by Bobby Fish, Hirooki Goto, Katsuyori Shibata and Kyle O'Reilly.

=== Ring of Honor (2014–2016) ===
Anderson and Gallows made their debut for American Ring of Honor (ROH) promotion on May 17, 2014, during the War of the Worlds event, which was co-produced by ROH and NJPW, successfully defending the IWGP Tag Team Championship against The Briscoes (Jay Briscoe and Mark Briscoe). They also appeared for ROH in 2015, and on January 23, 2016, took part in an eight-man tag team match, where all three of the promotion's titles were on the line in which Anderson and Gallows teamed up with Bullet Club stablemates The Young Bucks (Matt Jackson and Nick Jackson), but were defeated by ROH World Champion Jay Lethal, ROH World Television Champion Roderick Strong and ROH World Tag Team Champions War Machine (Hanson and Ray Rowe), who all retained their titles.

=== Independent circuit (2014–2016) ===
On December 20, 2014, Anderson and Gallows made their debut as a tag team on the American independent circuit, defeating Reality Check (Craven Varro and Devon Moore) at a Pro Wrestling Syndicate (PWS) event. During the summer of 2015, the two worked several Global Force Wrestling (GFW) events, where they took part in the GFW Tag Team Championship tournament. In October 2015, Anderson and Gallows took part in a Revolution Pro Wrestling (RPW) event in Reading, England, which also featured several other NJPW wrestlers. That same month, they also took part in German promotion Westside Xtreme Wrestling's World Tag Team Tournament, where they made it to the quarterfinals, before losing to Big Daddy Walter and Zack Sabre Jr.

=== WWE (2016–2020) ===
==== The Club and Raw Tag Team Champions (2016–2019) ====
"Anderson and Gallows have nearly had all the luster removed from them since their debut ... . [They] appear to be just another tag team that gets used as fodder whenever a main event story crosses their path. ... Roman Reigns gains next to nothing from beating Karl Anderson without first establishing that as an accomplishment."

— Pro Wrestling Dot Net writer Jake Barnett after the May 5, 2016, episode of SmackDown

On January 5, 2016, one day after Wrestle Kingdom 10, WWE.com published an article teasing the signing of several New Japan Pro-Wrestling stars including Gallows and Anderson, Bullet Club stablemate AJ Styles, and Shinsuke Nakamura. On the April 11, 2016 episode of Raw, Gallows (who returned to his Luke Gallows ring name) and Anderson made their respective return and debut for WWE, attacking The Usos (Jey and Jimmy Uso), establishing themselves as heels in the process and with the duo's NJPW background being acknowledged by WWE announcers. On the following week's Raw, WWE began teasing an alliance between Gallows and Anderson and their former Bullet Club stablemate AJ Styles when, after meeting Styles in a backstage interview, Gallows and Anderson attacked his Payback opponent Roman Reigns in the ring; Styles, however, did not seem pleased with the attack. Gallows and Anderson wrestled their first WWE match on the April 25 Raw, defeating The Usos. Over the next weeks, Gallows and Anderson continued teasing an uneasy alliance with Styles, while having several face offs with The Usos and Reigns, including at Payback, where the two failed in their attempt to help Styles capture the WWE World Heavyweight Championship from Reigns, and the following week's SmackDown, where the two suffered their first WWE loss, when Reigns pinned Anderson in a six-man tag team match. On the May 9 Raw, the trio of Styles, Gallows and Anderson was dubbed "The Club". The Club disbanded two weeks later on Raw, when Styles stated that he wanted an amicable separation from Gallows and Anderson, blaming them and The Usos for his failure to win the WWE World Heavyweight Championship at the previous day's Extreme Rules. Though Styles stated that the three could remain "brothers", Gallows and Anderson refused and ended the friendship altogether. On the May 30 episode of Raw, Gallows and Anderson entered the WWE Tag Team Championship picture by attacking reigning champions The New Day, while later in the show, Styles turned on the returning John Cena and reunited with Gallows and Anderson. On July 19, The Club was split up in the 2016 WWE draft with Gallows and Anderson being drafted to Raw and Styles to SmackDown, which resulted in them wrestling their last match together as a trio on July 24 at Battleground in a loss against John Cena, Enzo Amore and Big Cass.

Afterwards, Gallows and Anderson continued feuding with The New Day, attacking and sidelining Big E on the August 1 episode of Raw, which led to the other two New Day members, Kofi Kingston and Xavier Woods, agreeing to defend the WWE Tag Team Championship against them. The title match on August 21 at SummerSlam ended in a disqualification win for Gallows and Anderson, when Anderson was attacked by the returning Big E. Gallows and Anderson received two more shots at the newly renamed Raw Tag Team Championship, first on September 25 at Clash of Champions and then the following day on Raw, but were both times defeated by members of The New Day. On the November 7 episode of Raw, Gallows and Anderson were announced as part of Team Raw for the 10–on–10 Survivor Series tag team elimination match at Survivor Series. The same night, while being at odds with the rest of Team Raw, they defeated The New Day in a non-title bout. At Survivor Series, Gallows and Anderson were eliminated from the match by Rhyno. Gallows and Anderson received two more shots at the Raw Tag Team Championship, but were both times defeated by The New Day, first on the November 28 episode of Raw, and then in a three-way match, also involving Cesaro and Sheamus, on the December 12 episode of Raw. On the January 18, 2017 episode of Raw, Gallows and Anderson appeared to defeat Cesaro and Sheamus by pinfall for the Raw Tag Team Championship; however, due to Sheamus having hit the referee, the decision was reversed to a disqualification, leading to them winning the match but not the title. This led to a rematch with two referees on the Royal Rumble pre-show on January 29, where Gallows and Anderson became the new Raw Tag Team Champions. Gallows and Anderson made a successful title defense at Fastlane, against Enzo Amore and Big Cass. At WrestleMania 33 on April 2, they lost the title to the Hardy Boyz (Jeff Hardy and Matt Hardy) in a four-way ladder match, also involving Cesaro and Sheamus as well as Enzo Amore and Big Cass, ending their reign at 63 days.

On the January 1, 2018, Raw, the duo turned face by appearing as former Bullet Club stablemate Finn Bálor's surprise tag team partners. After a brief feud, they lost to The Revival at the Royal Rumble kickoff.

On April 17, as part of the Superstar Shake-up, Gallows and Anderson were drafted to SmackDown. On the May 22 episode of SmackDown Live, they defeated The Usos to become number one contenders for the SmackDown Tag Team Championship. At Money in the Bank kickoff, they failed to win the title from The Bludgeon Brothers. At Survivor Series, they made up part of Team SmackDown as they took on Team Raw, and they would go on to win the match. The team hardly appeared on SmackDown during their year on the brand. A WWE.com article blamed their lack of success on the brand on being "in the same division as The New Day, The Bar, The Usos and The Bludgeon Brothers."

==== Reuniting with AJ Styles (2019–2020) ====
On the April 29, 2019 episode of Raw, Gallows and Anderson returned to the Raw brand, losing to The Usos. As of that match, they had not won a match on television since they defeated The Usos in May 2018. In July 2019, it was reported that they had re-signed with WWE to five-year contracts. After Styles lost a United States Championship match to Ricochet, Gallows and Anderson helped Styles to beat up Ricochet, and reuniting The Club as heels. On the July 22 episode of Raw, The Club was renamed The O.C., meaning "The Original, The Official, and The Only Club That Matters". On the July 29 episode of Raw, Gallows and Anderson defeated the Usos and The Revival in a triple threat tag team match to capture the Raw Tag Team Championships for a second time. They would then go on to lose the titles on the August 19 episode of Raw to Seth Rollins and Braun Strowman. During the majority of their stint on Raw in 2019–20, Gallows and Anderson were mainly used to build younger upcoming talent such as The Street Profits, Viking Raiders And Ricochet etc. On October 31, at Crown Jewel, they won the WWE Tag Team World Cup and were declared "The Greatest Tag Team In the World".

Gallows and Anderson entered the 2020 Royal Rumble match at entry numbers 24 and 20, respectively, but were unsuccessful as they were eliminated separately by Rated-RKO (Edge and Randy Orton). At WrestleMania 36, they interfered in the Boneyard match between Styles and The Undertaker unsuccessfully trying to help the former win; this would be their final WWE appearances.

Despite renewing their contracts with WWE, and receiving many offers from other promotions, Gallows and Anderson were released from their WWE contracts due to budget cuts resulting from the COVID-19 pandemic on April 15—which would end their 4-year stint with the company.

=== Impact Wrestling (2020–2022) ===
On July 18, 2020, Gallows and Anderson announced that they had signed two-year contracts with Impact Wrestling and would be appearing at Slammiversary. At the event, Gallows and Anderson, now known as The Good Brothers, appeared at the end of the show, saving Eddie Edwards from an attack by Ace Austin and Madman Fulton before celebrating with Edwards, establishing themselves as faces. On the July 28 episode of Impact!, The Good Brothers made their in-ring debut, defeating Reno Scum. At Bound for Glory, The Good Brothers competed in a four-way tag team match for the Impact World Tag Team Championship, which was won by The North (Ethan Page and Josh Alexander). On November 14, at Turning Point, The Good Brothers defeated The North to win the Impact World Tag Team Championship for the first time. On the December 15 episode of Impact!, they aligned themselves with Kenny Omega, and attacked Rich Swann and The Motor City Machine Guns (Alex Shelley and Chris Sabin), thus turning heel. They retained the titles for 119 days, until they lost them against FinJuice (David Finlay and Juice Robinson) at Sacrifice on March 13, 2021.

At Slammiversary, The Good Brothers defeated Rich Swann and Willie Mack, Fallah Bahh and No Way, and champions Violent By Design (Joe Doering and Rhino) in a four-way tag team match to win the Impact World Tag Team Championship for the second time. They retained their title against Swann and Mack, and Violent By Design in a three-way tag team match at Emergence, and against FinJuice and Bullet Club (Chris Bey and Hikuleo) at Bound for Glory in another three-way tag team match. On the February 19, 2022 at No Surrender, The Good Brothers rejoined the Bullet Club. The Good Brothers regained the Impact tag team titles on June 19, 2022, by defeating The Briscoe Brothers. They held the titles until August 26, 2022, when they lost the titles to the OGK (Mike Bennett and Matt Taven), who were representing the Honor No More faction.

=== Return to independent circuit (2020–2022) ===
Since departing WWE, The Good Brothers returned to the American independent circuit. On August 1, 2020, Anderson and Gallows along with Rocky Romero promoted their first pay-per-view event called Talk 'N Shop A Mania. They held a second event later that year in November called Talk 'N Shop A Mania 2: Rise Of The Torturer.

On September 26, 2020, The Good Brothers won Lariato Pro Wrestling Guild's Lariato Pro Tag Team Championship by defeating Regenesis (Francisco Ciatso and Storm Thomas), their first title on the independent circuit.

=== All Elite Wrestling (2021) ===
The Good Brothers made their AEW debut at the end of AEW Dynamite New Year's Smash Night 1, saving Kenny Omega from Jon Moxley and making the "Too Sweet" hand gesture along with Omega and The Young Bucks. The Good Brothers were making appearances in AEW, due to a working relationship crossover deal with Impact Wrestling. They later aligned themselves with The Elite. On the August 11 edition of Dynamite, The Good Brothers successfully defended their Impact World Tag Team Championships against The Dark Order, (Evil Uno and Stu Grayson).

=== Return to NJPW (2021–2023) ===
In June 2021, it was announced that The Good Brothers would be returning to New Japan Pro Wrestling for the first time since early 2016 as part of the United States–based show NJPW Strong and would compete in its Tag Team Turbulence tournament. In the first round they defeated Clark Connors and T. J. Perkins. In the semi-finals they defeated Yuji Nagata and Ren Narita to advance to the tournament finals. In the finals, they defeated Violence Unlimited, which consisted of Brody King and Chris Dickinson, to win the tournament.

Gallows and Anderson appeared at NJPW Resurgence on August 14, they would defeat Jon Moxley and his mystery partner Yuji Nagata. After the match, they were confronted by the Guerrillas of Destiny. On April 24, 2022, Gallows and Anderson rejoined Bullet Club at Windy City Riot losing to the United Empire in a ten-man tag team match. At Dominion 6.12 in Osaka-jo Hall on June 12, Anderson defeated Tama Tonga for the NEVER Openweight Championship. On October 10, 2022, Anderson unexpectedly returned to WWE while still being recognized as the NEVER Openweight Champion.

On January 4, 2023, at Wrestle Kingdom 17, Anderson lost the NEVER Openweight Championship back to Tama Tonga, thus marking his final appearance for NJPW.

=== Return to WWE (2022–2026) ===
On the October 10, 2022, episode of Raw, Gallows and Anderson made their unannounced return to WWE to reunite with AJ Styles as The O.C. in Styles' feud with The Judgment Day.

During the 2023 WWE Draft, both Gallows and Anderson were drafted to the SmackDown brand.

On the February 20, 2024, episode of NXT, Gallows and Anderson attacked Axiom and Nathan Frazer and Chase University (Andre Chase and Duke Hudson) after the two teams faced each other, turning heel for the first time since 2022 and marking Gallows and Anderson's return to NXT. On February 8, 2025, they were released from their WWE contracts.

On the February 23, 2026 episode of Raw, the Good Brothers made a one night return to WWE for the tribute to AJ Styles, who retired a few weeks prior at Royal Rumble. On April 17, they would induct Styles into WWE Hall of Fame as part of the Class of 2026.

=== Second return to NJPW (2025–present) ===
On May 9, 2025, Gallows and Anderson returned to NJPW, teaming with The Young Bucks in a winning effort against Bullet Club War Dogs (Clark Connors, David Finlay, Gabe Kidd, and Gedo) on May 9 at Resurgence.

=== Second return to independent circuit (2025–present) ===
On May 10, 2025, the Good Brothers made their debut for Maple Leaf Pro Wrestling (MLP) at Northern Rising, where they faced David Finlay and Drilla Moloney of Bullet Club War Dogs with the match ending in a double countout. On July 5 at MLP Resurrection, the Good Brothers defeated Finlay and Moloney in a rematch.

=== Pro Wrestling Noah (2026–present) ===
On January 1, 2026, at Noah The New Year 2026, the Good Brothers made their Pro Wrestling Noah debut, defeating Kaito Kiyomiya and Jack Morris.

== Other media ==
The Good Brothers host a weekly podcast named Talk'N Shop which is part of the expanding Talk'N Shop Network.

During 2021 and 2022, AXS TV which aired Impact Wrestling (now TNA Impact! after the re-branding of Impact to TNA) created Bad A$$ Movie Night With The Good Brothers, where Gallows and Anderson hosted and provided commentary during breaks of popular movies being broadcast on the network.

== Championships and accomplishments ==
- AAW: Professional Wrestling Redefined
  - AAW Tag Team Championship (1 time)
- Atomic Legacy Wrestling
  - ALW Tag Team Championship (1 time)
- FLEX Wrestling
  - FLEX Tag Team Championship (1 time, current)
- Impact Wrestling
  - Impact World Tag Team Championship (3 times)
  - Impact Year End Awards (3 times)
    - Finishing Move of the Year (2020) Magic Killer
    - Moment of the Year (2020) – debuting on Impact at Slammiversary, shared with the other returns and debuts that night
    - Tag Team of the Year (2021)
- Lariato Pro Wrestling
  - Lariato Pro Tag Team Championship (1 time)
- MCW Pro Wrestling
  - MCW Tag Team Championship (1 time)
- Major League Wrestling
  - MLW World Tag Team Championship (1 time, current)
- Maple Leaf Pro Wrestling
  - MLP Canadian Tag Team Championship (1 time, inaugural)
- New Japan Pro-Wrestling
  - NEVER Openweight Championship (1 time) – Anderson
  - IWGP Tag Team Championship (3 times)
  - World Tag League (2013)
  - NJPW Strong Tag Team Turbulence Tournament (2021)
- Pro Wrestling Illustrated
  - Ranked Gallows No. 65 of the top 500 singles wrestlers in the PWI 500 in 2016
  - Ranked Anderson No. 69 of the top 500 singles wrestlers in the PWI 500 in 2016
- The Crash
  - The Crash Tag Team Championship (1 time)
- World Series Wrestling
  - WSW Tag Team Championship (2 times, current)
- WWE
  - WWE Raw Tag Team Championship (2 times)
  - WWE Tag Team World Cup (2019)
