= Northern Rising (2025) =

2025 Maple Leaf Pro Wrestling event

- Promotional poster of the event
- Promotion: Maple Leaf Pro Wrestling
- Date: May 10, 2025
- City: Toronto, Ontario, Canada
- Venue: Mattamy Athletic Centre at Maple Leaf Gardens

Pay-per-view chronology
← Previous; Mayhem	Next → Resurrection

Northern Rising chronology
← Previous; First	Next → 2026

Northern Rising was a professional wrestling pay-per-view event produced by Canadian promotion Maple Leaf Pro Wrestling (MLP).

The event took place at the Mattamy Athletic Centre at Maple Leaf Gardens in Toronto, Ontario, Canada, the venue where many events from the defunct promotion Maple Leaf Wrestling were held. It streamed on Triller TV on May 10, 2025. It featured independent wrestlers and contracted wrestlers from various promotions around the world such as All Elite Wrestling, Tokyo Joshi Pro-Wrestling, National Wrestling Alliance, Total Nonstop Action Wrestling, New Japan Pro Wrestling and WWE via their independent development program WWE ID.

== Production ==
=== Background ===
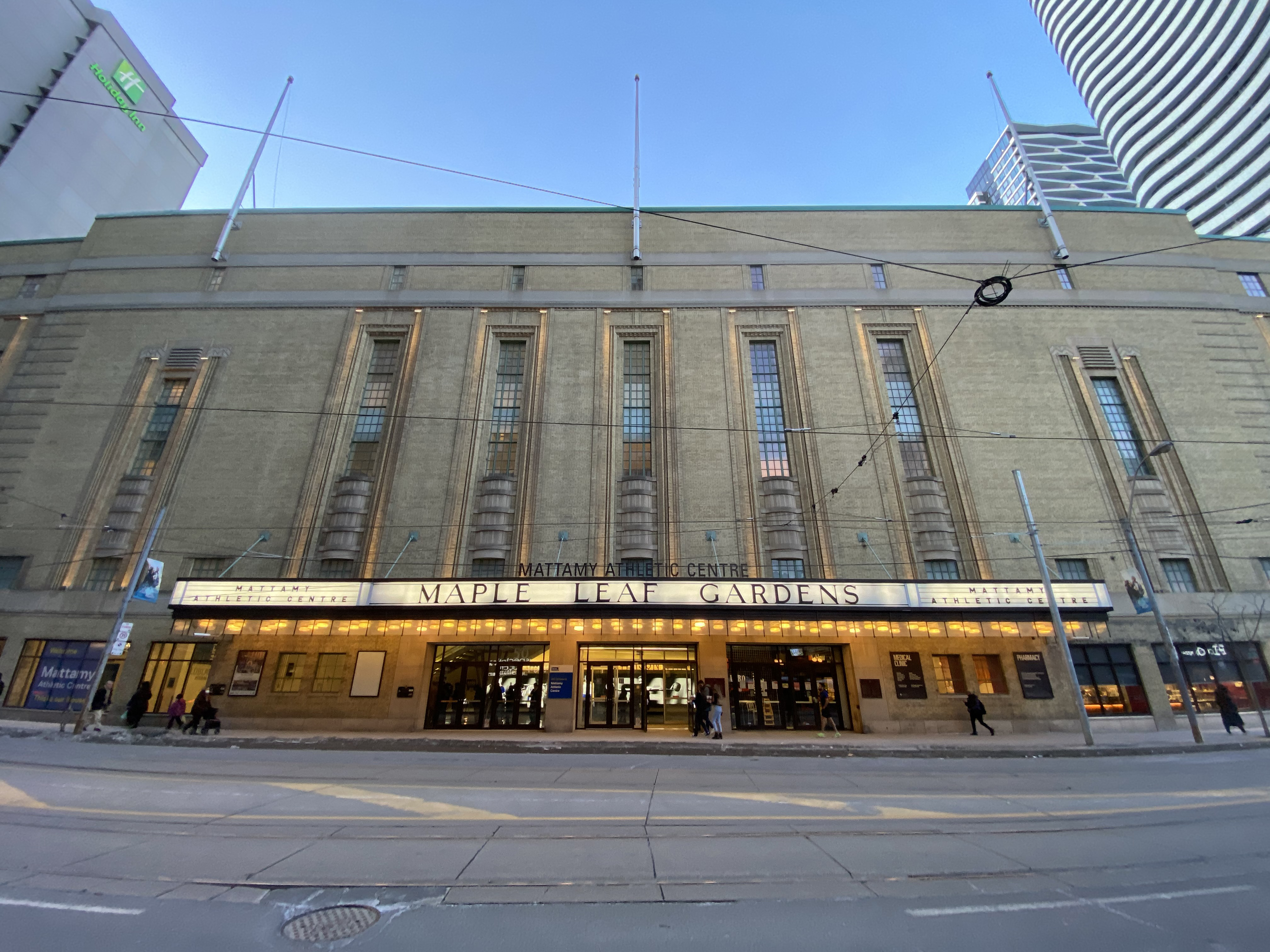
The event took place at the Mattamy Athletic Centre at Maple Leaf Gardens in Toronto, Ontario, Canada.

On January 30, 2025, MLP announced in addition to its return with Mayhem in Windsor, Ontario, Canada, Maple Leaf Pro Wrestling would hold its first show at the Mattamy Athletic Centre at Maple Leaf Gardens in Toronto, Ontario, Canada titled Northern Rising which would take on May 10, 2025. On March 4, 2025, MLP announced that a tournament to crown the MLP Women's Canadian Champion would be held with opening matches taking place during Mayhem on both nights and the finals taking place at Northern Rising.

=== Storylines ===
Northern Rising featured multiple professional wrestling matches that involved different wrestlers from pre-existing scripted feuds and storylines. Storylines were produced on various Border City Wrestling and Maple Leaf Pro Wrestling events.

== Results ==
No.	Results	Stipulations	Times
1^{P}	Amir Jordan, El Reverso and Vaughn Vertigo defeated Bryce Hansen, Raj Singh and Rohan Raja by pinfall	Six-man tag team match	—
2	Josh Alexander defeated Q. T. Marshall by submission	Singles match	10:55
3	Zack Sabre Jr. defeated Jonathan Gresham by pinfall	Singles match	16:27
4	Serena Deeb defeated Miyu Yamashita by pinfall	Singles match	12:56
5	Bullet Club War Dogs (David Finlay and Drilla Moloney) vs. The Good Brothers (Doc Gallows and Karl Anderson) ended in a double countout	Tag team match	11:22
6	Thom Latimer (c) defeated Stu Grayson by pinfall	Singles match for the NWA Worlds Heavyweight Championship	13:04
7	"Speedball" Mike Bailey defeated Gabe Kidd and Michael Oku	Three-way match	21:52
8	Gisele Shaw (with The Personal Concierge) defeated Kylie Rae by pinfall	Tournament Final for the inaugural MLP Women's Canadian Championship	18:05
9	Josh Alexander won by last eliminating Matt Cardona (Note: Other competitors: PCO, Rhyno, Billy Gunn, El Phantasmo, Raj Dhesi, Q. T. Marshall, Rich Swann, Psycho Mike, Bishop Dyer, Sheldon Jean, Bhupinder Gujjar, Johnny Parisi, Michael Allen Richard Clark, Alex Zayne, Mo Jabari, Rohan Raja, Brent Banks and El Reverso.)	20-man Gauntlet For The Gold for the inaugural MLP Canadian Championship	42:31
(c) / – the champion(s) heading into the match; P / – the match was broadcast on the pre-show

=== Inaugural Women's Canadian Championship tournament bracket ===
Quarterfinals; Mayhem (March 14)
Kylie Rae	Pin
Zoe Sager	7:36
Taylor Rising	Pin
Beaa Moss	5:39
Serena Deeb	Sub
Aurora Teves	7:40
Gisele Shaw	Pin
Laynie Luck	16:33

Semifinals; Mayhem (March 15)
Kylie Rae	Sub
Taylor Rising	11:05
Serena Deeb	Pin
Gisele Shaw	20:33

Final; Northern Rising (May 10)
Kylie Rae	Pin
Gisele Shaw	18:05
