= MLP Mayhem =

MLP Mayhem may refer to:

- MLP Mayhem (pay-per-view event), 2025 wrestling event by Maple Leaf Pro Wrestling
- MLP Mayhem (TV program), scheduled 2026 TV program by Maple Leaf Pro Wrestling
