= Doc Gallows =

American professional wrestler and promoter (born 1983)

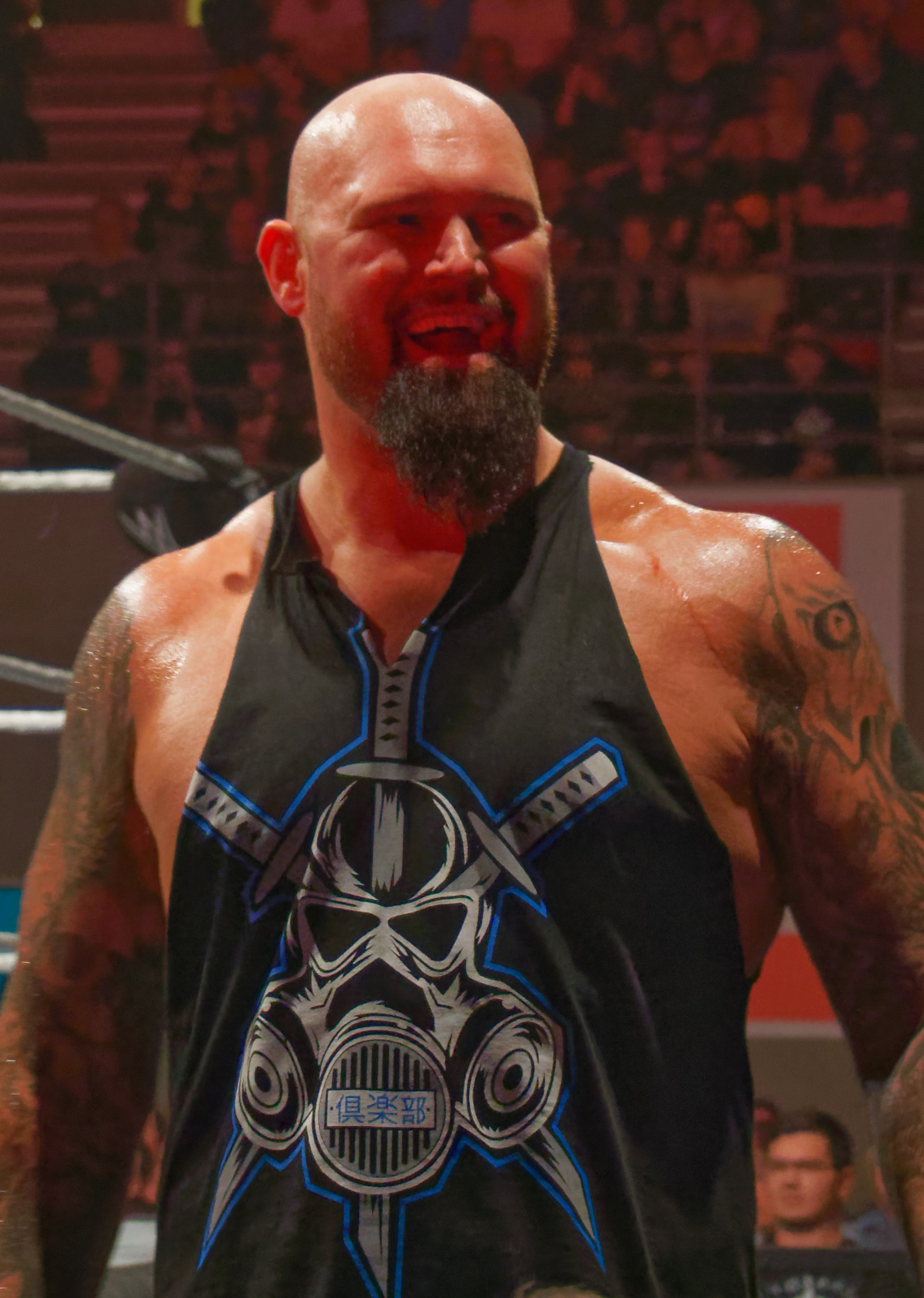
- Gallows in 2017

Personal information
- Born: Andrew William Hankinson; December 22, 1983 (age 42) Cumberland, Maryland, U.S.
- Education: Fairmont State University
- Spouses: Nicole Hasmuk (m. 2006; div. 2011) Amber O'Neal (m. 2014; div. 2017) Bethany Hankinson (m. 2019)
- Children: 4

Professional wrestling career
- Ring name(s): Big XLG; Deacon Deville; D.O.C. Doc Gallows; Dorian Deville; Festus; Festus Dalton; The Freakin' Deacon; Imposter Kane; Isaiah Cash; Johnny 99; Justice Dalton; Keith Hanson; Luke Gallow; Luke Gallows; The Masked Assassin; Sex Ferguson; Super Festus; Tex Ferguson
- Billed height: 6 ft 8 in (203 cm)
- Billed weight: 290 lb (132 kg)
- Billed from: Tokyo, Japan by way of Chicago, Illinois
- Trained by: Hugh Morrus
- Debut: 2002

Andrew William Hankinson (born December 22, 1983) is an American professional wrestler currently working as a freelancer under the ring name Doc Gallows. He is best known for his tenures in WWE, Total Nonstop Action Wrestling (TNA) and New Japan Pro-Wrestling (NJPW).

Hankinson began his career in 2002 and participated in that year's WWE Tough Enough, a contest created by WWE to find new prospects. Despite not winning the competition, he signed a development contract and was assigned to Deep South Wrestling, WWE's farm territory. In 2006, he started a feud with Kane, where Hankinson used Kane's old attire and mask, being called Imposter Kane. They faced each other at Vengeance, where Hankinson was victorious. He was repackaged as Festus, a quiet man who turns insane when the bell rings. He teamed with Jesse for almost two years before the two were split. Following this, he went on a brief hiatus from television before reappearing as Luke Gallows, the enforcer and "disciple" of CM Punk in the Straight Edge Society stable until his release from the company in 2010.

After leaving WWE, he signed a contract with Total Nonstop Action Wrestling (TNA) in 2011, where he became member of the villainous stable Aces & Eights under the ring name D.O.C. (Director of Chaos). He left TNA in 2013 and then signed a contract with the Japanese promotion New Japan Pro-Wrestling (NJPW) under the ring name Doc Gallows, making his debut in the 2013 World Tag League as the partner of Karl Anderson, joining the infamous Bullet Club stable. Gallows and Anderson won the Tag League and, during the following three years, they won the IWGP Tag Team Championship three times.

Gallows and Anderson would leave NJPW for WWE along with Bullet Club leader AJ Styles in 2016. Again as Luke Gallows, Gallows and Anderson would work as a tag team and, sometimes, as a stable with Styles known as The O.C. (The Original Club). They would win the WWE Raw Tag Team Championship twice, as well as the WWE Tag Team World Cup. They were released in 2020 due to the COVID-19 pandemic and, three months later, returned to TNA (which was known as Impact Wrestling from 2017 to 2024), where they won the Impact World Tag Team Championship in November. Their contracts with Impact expired in 2022 and that October, Gallows and Anderson returned to WWE and reunited with Styles as The O.C., before being released again in 2025.

== Professional wrestling career ==
=== Early career (2002-2005) ===
Hankinson began his career in West Virginia with Mason-Dixon Wrestling and in Pennsylvania with the World Star Wrestling Federation (AWA/World Star Wrestling), Summit Wrestling Association of Southern Pennsylvania, and Maryland-based promotions National Wrestling League and the Eastern Wrestling Alliance, wrestling as Dorian Deville, and for West Virginia's Championship Pro Wrestling as the masked wrestler Dargon. He also played college football at Fairmont State University.

=== World Wrestling Entertainment (2005–2010) ===
==== Deep South Wrestling (2005–2006) ====
In April 2005, despite failing to make it as one of the final ten contestants on the $1,000,000 Tough Enough, Hankinson was signed to a contract by World Wrestling Entertainment (WWE) and was assigned to the Deep South Wrestling (DSW) developmental territory.

Hankinson wrestled in DSW as Dorian "Deacon" Deville before changing his ring name to The Freakin' Deacon. He adopted the gimmick of a deranged, facepaint-wearing wrestler who came to the ring with a pet spider named Willow, whom he sometimes spoke to. He formed a partnership with executive Palmer Cannon and his posterior associate Dalip Singh, helping Cannon to gain DSW's ownership and attack his enemies, but Palmer and Singh betrayed Deacon and stole his spider. He then formed an alliance with announcer and wrestler Bill DeMott, who was in a feud against The Gymini. The team proved to be effective, but Deacon abandoned DeMott during a match, causing him to be beaten down until other wrestlers made the save. It was later revealed that Quintin Michaels had captured Willow and used it to blackmail Deacon into leaving, but he later got his pet back, regaining his freedom.

==== Main roster debut- Fake Kane (2006) ====
On May 29, 2006, Hankinson debuted on Raw as an imposter Kane. Wearing Kane's old mask and ring attire, he chokeslammed Kane during his match against Shelton Benjamin for the WWE Intercontinental Championship. Subsequently, Hankinson repeatedly attacked the real Kane during or after his matches. The pair finally faced off in a match at the Vengeance pay-per-view, with Hankinson winning using one of Kane's trademark moves. One night later, however, the storyline was abruptly ended when the original Kane attacked the Imposter Kane, removed his mask, and threw him out of the building.

==== Return to Deep South (2006–2007) ====
Hankinson returned to Deep South Wrestling, in addition to appearing at SmackDown! house shows. In August, he got involved in a storyline with The Bag Lady, who acted as his valet and love interest. Though he got often distracted by her, she helped him to win matches. In October, Deacon and Bag Lady formed an alliance with The Major Brothers (Brian and Brett Major) against the team Urban Assault (Eric Perez, Sonny Siaki, Afa Anoa'i Jr. and G-Rilla), as their enforcer G-Rilla had clashed with Bag Lady earlier. In December 2006, Deacon defeated G-Rilla in a singles match, causing the rest of Urban Assault to turn on G-Rilla and beat him up. Deacon then aided G-Rilla and formed a tag team with him, helping him to get revenge on Urban Assault. The pair also feuded with Team Elite (Derrick Neikirk and Mike Knox) for the DSW Tag Team Championship. However, in March 2007 Deacon was beaten up with steel chairs by Neikirk and Knox and needed to be carried to the hospital by G-Rilla. There G-Rilla sat accidentally over Willow, which killed the spider and sent its owner into a mental breakdown.

==== Teaming with Jesse (2007–2009) ====
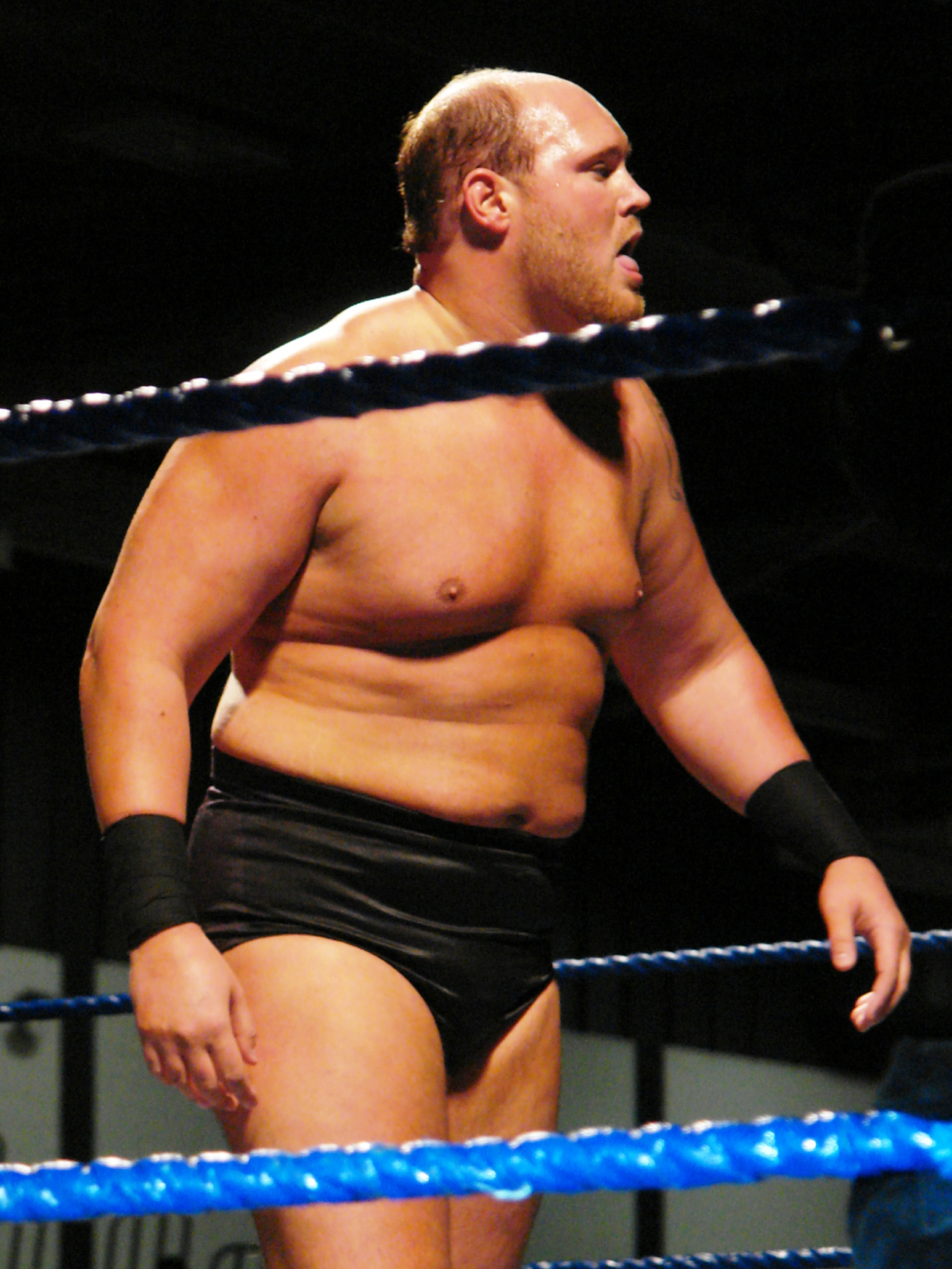
Hankinson as Festus in 2008

On the May 11, 2007, episode of SmackDown!, a vignette aired suggesting that Hankinson would be repackaged as Festus Dalton as part of a tag team using a Southern gimmick, alongside fellow WWE developmental talent Ray Gordy. On June 2, 2007, however, it was reported that WWE was dropping the "Dalton Boys" gimmick. The explanation for them not showing up on SmackDown was that they got lost on their way to the arena. Hankinson and Gordy had actually been sent to Ohio Valley Wrestling, where Hankinson changed his name to "Justice Dalton".

Hankinson was then renamed "Festus" while Gordy was dubbed "Jesse", and on the June 29, 2007, episode of SmackDown!, vignettes hyping Jesse and Festus began to air. For weeks, Jesse was presented as the mouth-piece of the tandem, who was in awe of his tag team partner. Hankinson, however, played a character that was mentally challenged and unresponsive. In spite of Festus' dimwitted nature, Jesse kept claiming that Festus was an emotionally driven and physically unstoppable giant. On the September 7, 2007, episode of SmackDown!, there was a segment featuring Jesse and Festus now actually in the arena rather than in a studio. On October 5, Hankinson won his debut match on SmackDown! with Jesse. When the opening bell rang, Festus' personality changed into a very focused and angry competitor as compared to the mentally disabled character he had portrayed. When the bell rang to signify the end of the match, Festus returned to his docile self. On the December 21 episode of SmackDown!, Festus defeated Deuce in a Santa Match, with both of them wearing Santa Claus outfits. On the January 25 episode of SmackDown, Jesse explained the reason that they had not been on television was because Festus has been seeing doctors about his "problems".

In 2008, before the bell rang, Jesse explained that Festus had changed. However, Festus did not change and continued to make a determined and monstrous face after the bell had rung. On the March 21 episode of SmackDown, Jesse and Festus had a chance to face John Morrison and The Miz for the WWE Tag Team Championship, but Morrison and The Miz retained the title. Festus received his first loss when he wrestled against World Heavyweight Champion The Undertaker on the April 11 episode of SmackDown, after passing out while in the Hell's Gate.

On April 15, 2009, Festus was drafted to the Raw brand as part of the 2009 Supplemental Draft and, as a result, was separated from his tag team partner Jesse, who remained on SmackDown.

==== Straight Edge Society (2009–2010) ====
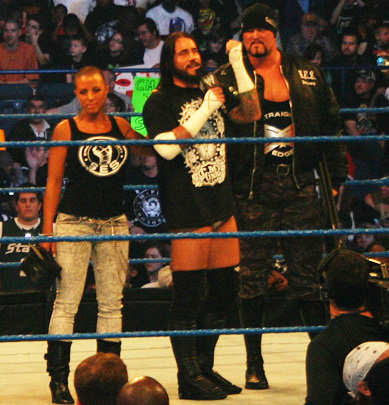
Luke Gallows (right) with fellow Straight Edge Society members Serena (left) and CM Punk (center)

After a three-month hiatus from television, Hankinson returned on the November 27, 2009, episode of SmackDown, repackaged as a villain under the name Luke Gallows, sporting a new attire along with a goatee, shaved head, and a considerably well built frame. After accompanying CM Punk to the ring for his match with Matt Hardy, Punk revealed that Gallows was actually Festus' true identity and claimed that Gallows' family and friends enabled his alcoholic inclination, which led to the mental state he was in as Festus, before stating that Gallows was cured due to Punk showing him the straight edge lifestyle. On the December 11 episode of SmackDown, Gallows and Punk defeated Hardy and R-Truth, after Gallows pinned Hardy with his new finishing move, the "Twelfth Step". On the January 8, 2010, episode of SmackDown, Gallows defeated Hardy. The next week, Gallows and Punk defeated Matt Hardy and The Great Khali, The Hart Dynasty, and Cryme Tyme in a fatal four-way match to become the number one contenders for the Unified WWE Tag Team Championship.

On the February 8 episode of Raw, The Straight Edge Society was eliminated in a Triple Threat elimination tag team match between them, The Miz and Big Show and DX for the Unified WWE Tag Team Championship. Miz and Big Show became the new Unified WWE Tag Team Champions. At WrestleMania XXVI Luke Gallows competed in a dark 30-man battle royal, which was won by Yoshi Tatsu. On the April 13 episode of NXT, he challenged CM Punk's rookie Darren Young and the stipulation, if Young lost, he would have had to surrender his hair to Punk and have it shaved bald. Gallows came close to getting the victory when Young came up with a roll-up and saved his hair, with Punk showing some favor to his rookie and Gallows seeming unhappy. At Extreme Rules, during Punk's Hair match against Rey Mysterio, Gallows and Serena helped Punk throughout the match until they were banned from ringside.

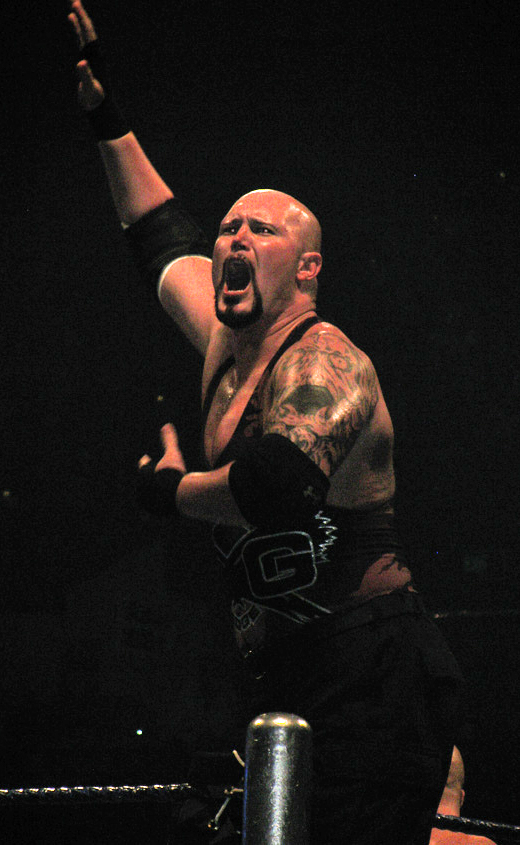
Hankinson in August 2010

On the July 2 tapings of SmackDown, after a match between Luke Gallows and Kane, a security video was shown by Serena of her being caught drinking in a bar by Punk on the same day of The Undertaker's attack proving The Straight Edge Society's innocence in order to save Punk. Serena begged for forgiveness even after Punk warned her not to, but the Straight Edge Society simply left without her. The following week, however, Serena was forgiven by Punk for her actions, as they embraced, but Gallows did not approve. The following week Gallows was set to fight Big Show but gave the match to the SES Masked Man, who was unmasked as Joey Mercury during the match. On the September 3 episode of SmackDown, Gallows and Punk faced The Big Show in a two-on-one handicap match, which Gallows and Punk lost. After the match Punk delivered the GTS on Gallows.

On the September 16 episode of WWE Superstars, before a match with MVP, Gallows cut a promo announcing that he was no longer part of the Society by proclaiming he was his own man. Gallows went on to lose the match. On the September 24 episode of SmackDown, Gallows began a slow face turn when he confronted CM Punk in a backstage segment stating that after defeating him, he would have a beer, but lost a match to Punk later in the night.

Gallows, now officially established as a face, defeated Vance Archer on the November 4 airing of Superstars. His final television appearance was during a backstage segment in which Kane was looking for his father, on the November 19 episode of SmackDown. Hankinson was released from his WWE contract on the same day, along with several other superstars.

=== Japan and Independent circuit (2010–2016) ===
Hankinson wrestled on December 3, 2010, as "Keith Hanson", at an Inoki Genome Federation (IGF) event, where he defeated The Predator. At IGF's Genome14 on February 5, 2011, he faced Predator again in a match that ended when an angry Antonio Inoki legitimately came to ringside shouting at them both to make them stop. On January 29, 2011, he lost to ECW Original Tommy Dreamer in a hardcore match at a National Wrestling Superstars (NWS) event in New Jersey. On March 25, 2011, Hankinson, working as Luke Gallows, made an appearance for the Japanese Apache Pro-Wrestling Army promotion, defeating Makoto Hashi. On May 29, 2011, Gallows debuted for NWA Rampage in Warner Robins, Georgia. Gallows went to a no-contest with Jimmy Rave, when Rave's stable, Jimmy Rave Approved, interfered in the match. Afterwards, an eight-man tag took place in which Gallows teamed with Kyle Matthews, J-Rod, and Frankie Valentine to defeat Rave, Sal Rinauro, Chip Day and Corey Hollis. On June 5, Gallows returned to NWA Rampage and lost to Heavyweight Champion Bull Buchanan. In August 2011, Hankinson and Cliff Compton traveled to wrestle in Nigeria. He was defeated by The Great Power Uti, who took his belt.

Hankinson appeared on the World Wrestling Fan Xperience (WWFX) Champions Showcase Tour in Manila, Philippines on February 4, 2012, where he wrestled under the name Luke Gallow (using his heel S.E.S. gimmick) in a losing effort to Rhyno. He also appeared at Wrestlerama in Georgetown, Guyana. On October 6, 2012, he was defeated by Scott Steiner in the House of Hardcore's first show. On September 22, 2012, Luke Gallows would debut for Dynamite Championship Wrestling at their Annual Breast Cancer Benefit Event. He won the American Pro Wrestling Alliance World Tag Team Championship in 2012 with Knux, but they were later stripped of the title, as they were made inactive, on March 1, 2013. From June 3 to 13, 2012, Hankinson, as Luke Gallows, worked a tour with the Japanese Pro Wrestling Noah promotion, during which he often teamed with Bobby Fish and Roderick Strong. He appeared for Pro Wrestling Syndicate on May 18, 2013, along with Knux and D'Lo Brown. Hankinson made his last independent appearance on January 16, 2016, billed as Luke Gallows, when he unsuccessfully challenged Chris Nelms in a Fatal 4-Way match for WrestleMerica Brass Knuckles Championship.

On May 6, 2015, Global Force Wrestling (GFW) announced Gallows as part of their roster. Gallows and Karl Anderson main evented the first-ever GFW show on June 12, defeating the New Heavenly Bodies (Dustin and Justin) in a tag team match.

=== Total Nonstop Action Wrestling (2011–2013) ===
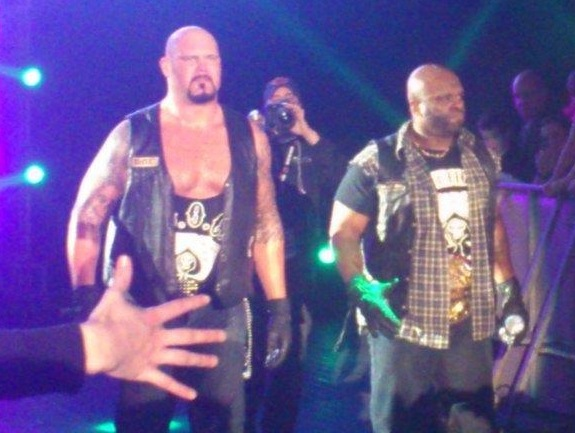
D.O.C. representing Aces & Eights alongside Devon

On June 14, 2011, Hankinson wrestled a tryout dark match for Total Nonstop Action Wrestling (TNA), in which he was defeated by Gunner. In December 2011, Hankinson took part in TNA's India project, Ring Ka King, under the ring name "The Outlaw" Isaiah Cash. On June 21, 2012, Hankinson wrestled another tryout dark match for TNA.

Hankinson began working TNA house shows as a masked member of the Aces & Eights stable in September 2012. On September 4, Hankinson confirmed that he had signed a contract with the promotion. at Bound for Glory, Hankinson and Knux (still masked) defeated Bully Ray and Sting to gain full access to the Impact Zone. Hankinson was unmasked and revealed as a member of the Aces & Eights on the November 1 episode of TNA Impact!. The following week, Hankinson, billed as D.O.C. (Director of Chaos), teamed with stablemate Devon in a tag team match, where they were defeated by Kurt Angle and Sting via disqualification. Having been told to show why he deserved a spot in Aces & Eights, D.O.C. afterwards put Sting through a table, before beating him with a ball-peen hammer. DOC made his TNA pay-per-view debut three days later at Turning Point, defeating Joseph Park in a singles match. On the December 6 episode of TNA Impact!, D.O.C. was defeated by Angle, which ended by disqualification when Aces & Eights attacked Angle.

On December 9 at Final Resolution, D.O.C. teamed with Devon and a masked Knux and C.J. O'Doyle in a losing effort to Angle, Garett Bischoff, Samoa Joe, and Wes Brisco. on the December 13 episode of TNA Impact!, D.O.C. and a masked Knux lost to James Storm and Jeff Hardy. At Genesis, D.O.C. was defeated by Sting in a singles match. On the February 7 episode of TNA Impact!, D.O.C. and Devon were defeated by Bully Ray and Sting in a Tables match. On the February 21 episode of TNA Impact!, Aces & Eights, consisting of D.O.C., Devon and Mr. Anderson defeated Sting, Hulk Hogan and Bully Ray in a six-man tag team match after they took Hogan out before the match. At Lockdown, Aces & Eights, consisting of D.O.C., Devon, Garett Bischoff, Knux, and Mr. Anderson were defeated by Team TNA, consisting of Eric Young, James Storm, Magnus, Samoa Joe, and Sting in a Lethal Lockdown match. On the March 18 episode of TNA Xplosion, D.O.C. lost to James Storm. At Hardcore Justice 2, Aces & Eights (D.O.C., Wes Brisco and Knux) lost to James Storm, Magnus and Bob Holly in a Six-Man Hardcore Elimination tag team match. At World Cup, D.O.C. a part of Team Aces & Eights started off when D.O.C and Knux defeated Team International's Funaki and Petey Williams later that night Team Aces & Eights lost a Five-on-Five Elimination Tag Team match to Team USA (Christopher Daniels, James Storm, Kazarian, Kenny King and Mickie James) failing to win the cup. on the April 4 episode of TNA Impact!, Aces & Eights (D.O.C., Devon, Knux, Wes Brisco and Garett Bischoff) defeated Kurt Angle, Eric Young, Samoa Joe, Magnus and Joseph Park in a ten-man tag team match. On the May 9 episode of NA Impact!, D.O.C. lost a match to Magnus. At Slammiversary XI, D.O.C. and other members of the Aces & Eights helped Bully Ray defeat Sting in a No Holds Barred match to retain the TNA World Heavyweight Championship. On the June 13 episode of TNA Impact!, D.O.C. participated in an Aces & Eights battle royal match for a spot in the 2013 Bound for Glory Series, but ended up being thrown out by Mr. Anderson after refusing to get out of the ring, though not turning face. On the July 11 episode of TNA Impact!, D.O.C. lost his bid to become the vice president of Aces & Eights as Knux gave his deciding vote to Mr. Anderson, to D.O.C.'s disgust. On July 12, Hankinson's contract expired. Four days later, he announced he and TNA had officially parted ways. His departure was explained on screen as having turned in his kutte after losing the bid of Vice President to Mr. Anderson.

=== New Japan Pro-Wrestling (2013–2016) ===
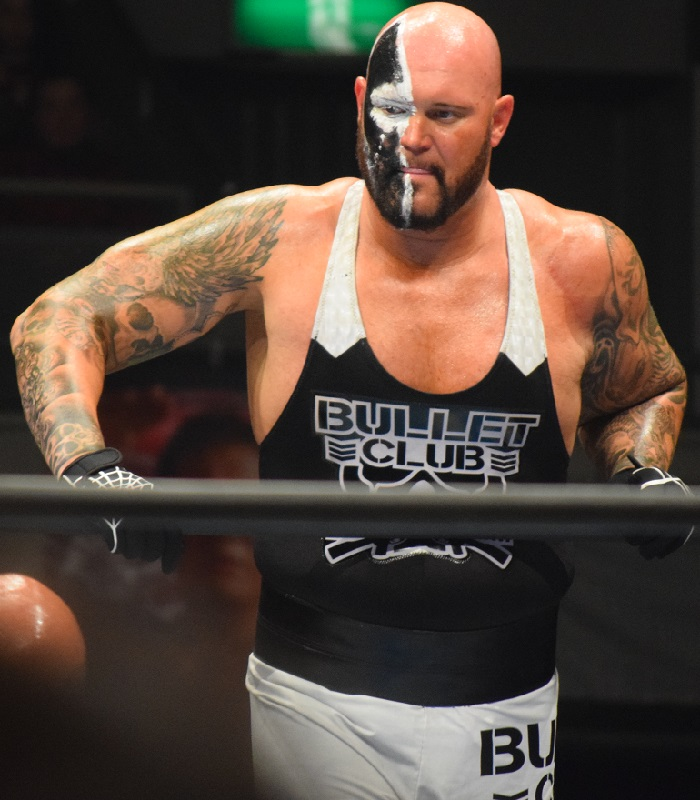
Gallows in 2016 as part of Bullet Club

On November 11, 2013, New Japan Pro-Wrestling announced Hankinson as a participant in the 2013 World Tag League, where he would be teaming with Karl Anderson as part of Bullet Club, thus establishing himself as a heel. Hankinson made his New Japan debut under the name Doc Gallows on November 23, when he and Anderson defeated Bushi and Kota Ibushi in a non-tournament match, with Gallows pinning Bushi for the win. In the round-robin portion of the tournament, which ran from November 24 to December 7, Gallows and Anderson finished with a record of four wins and two losses, winning their block and advancing to the semi-finals. On December 8, Gallows and Anderson first defeated G.B.H. (Togi Makabe and Tomoaki Honma) in the semi-finals and then Tencozy (Hiroyoshi Tenzan and Satoshi Kojima) in the finals to win the 2013 World Tag League and earn a shot at the IWGP Tag Team Championship. Gallows returned to New Japan on January 4, 2014, at Wrestle Kingdom 8 in Tokyo Dome, where he and Anderson defeated K.E.S. (Davey Boy Smith Jr. and Lance Archer) to become the new IWGP Tag Team Champions.

Gallows and Anderson made their first successful title defense on February 9 at The New Beginning in Hiroshima, defeating K.E.S. in a rematch. Their second defense took place on April 6 at Invasion Attack 2014, where they defeated Hirooki Goto and Katsuyori Shibata. Gallows and Anderson's third successful defense took place just seven days later, during New Japan's trip to Taiwan, when they defeated Goto and Captain Taiwan. On May 17, Gallows and Anderson made their fourth successful title defense against The Briscoes (Jay Briscoe and Mark Briscoe) at a NJPW and Ring of Honor (ROH) co-produced event, War of the Worlds, in New York City. On June 21 at Dominion 6.21, Gallows and Anderson made their fifth successful defense against Ace to King (Hiroshi Tanahashi and Togi Makabe). From July 21 to August 8, Gallows took part in the 2014 G1 Climax, where he finished ninth out of the eleven wrestlers in his block with a record of four wins and six losses. On September 21 at Destruction in Kobe, Gallows and Anderson made their sixth successful title defense against Kazuchika Okada and Yoshi-Hashi. In December, Gallows and Anderson made it to the finals of the 2014 World Tag League, after winning their block with a record of five wins and two losses. On December 7, Gallows and Anderson were defeated in the finals of the tournament by Goto and Shibata. Gallows and Anderson's year-long reign as the IWGP Tag Team Champions came to an end on January 4, 2015, at Wrestle Kingdom 9 in Tokyo Dome, where they were defeated by Goto and Shibata.

Gallows and Anderson regained the title from Goto and Shibata on February 11 at The New Beginning in Osaka. They lost the title to The Kingdom (Matt Taven and Michael Bennett) on April 5 at Invasion Attack 2015. They regained the title from The Kingdom on July 5 at Dominion 7.5 in Osaka-jo Hall. From July 20 to August 14, Gallows took part in the 2015 G1 Climax, where he finished last in his block with a record of three wins and six losses. On August 2, he faced A.J. Styles and was defeated, taking the Bloody Sunday, resulting in a loss. On January 4, 2016, at Wrestle Kingdom 10 in Tokyo Dome, Gallows and Anderson lost the IWGP Tag Team Championship to Togi Makabe and Tomoaki Honma. Hours after the event, it was reported that both Gallows and Anderson had given their notice to NJPW on the morning of January 4, announcing that they were leaving the promotion for WWE. TNA later claimed that Gallows had agreed to return to the promotion, along with Anderson and Styles, before the trio broke off communication with TNA over the Christmas holiday. Though not under contract, Gallows was expected to honor previously booked dates through February. On February 14 at The New Beginning in Niigata, Gallows and Anderson received a rematch for the IWGP Tag Team Championship, but were again defeated by Makabe and Honma. On February 20, Gallows and Anderson wrestled their final NJPW match, where they teamed with Bullet Club stablemates Bad Luck Fale and Tama Tonga, losing to Bobby Fish, Hirooki Goto, Katsuyori Shibata, and Kyle O'Reilly in an eight-man tag team match.

=== Return to WWE (2016–2020) ===
==== Tag team championship pursuits (2016–2019) ====
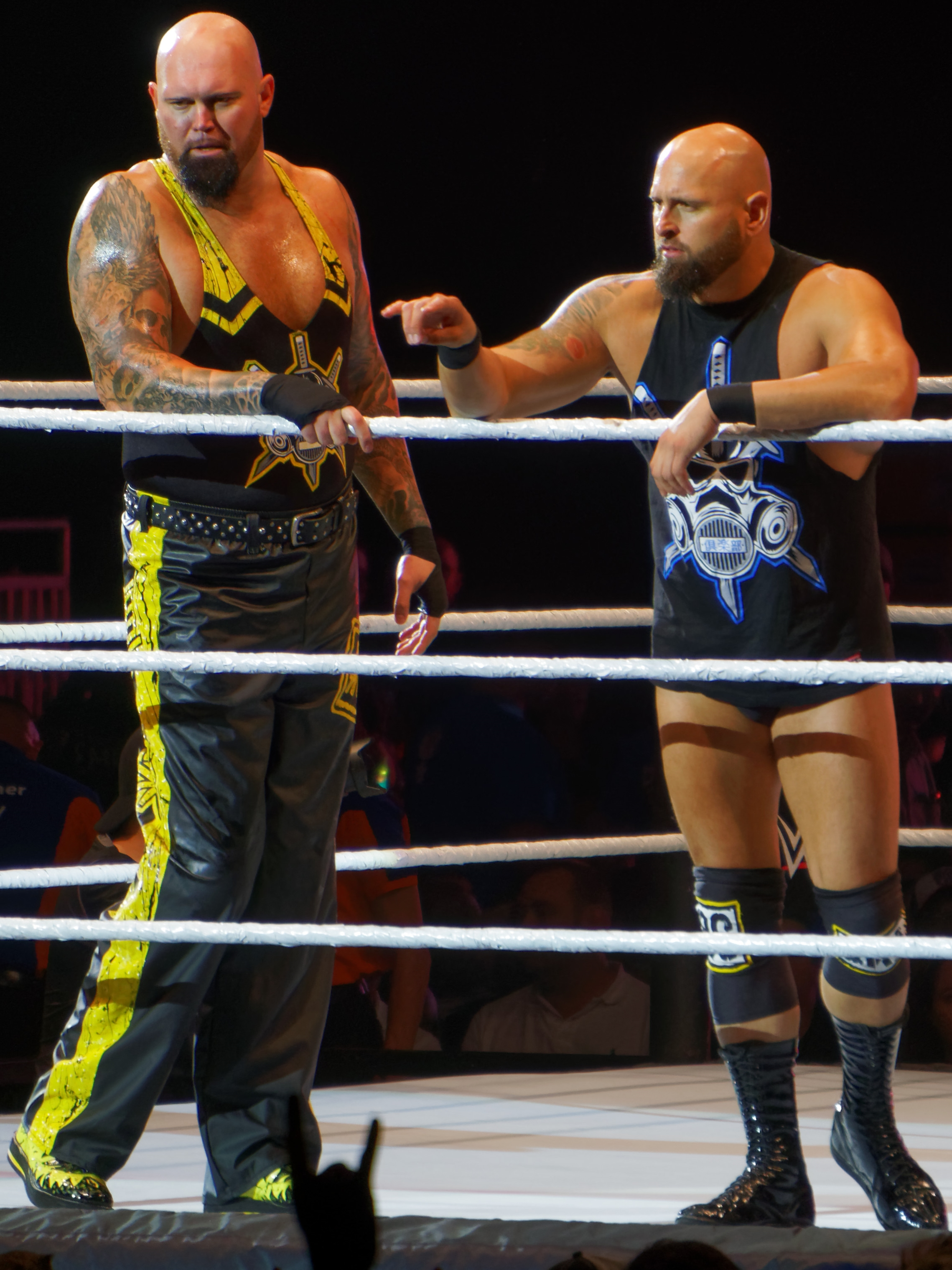
Gallows (left) with Karl Anderson in September 2016

On the April 11, 2016, episode of Raw, Gallows and Karl Anderson (with Gallows reverting to his former WWE ring name, Luke Gallows) made their debut, attacking The Usos, thus establishing themselves as heels. On the April 18 episode of Raw, Gallows and Anderson attacked WWE World Heavyweight Champion Roman Reigns, following Reigns' promo with AJ Styles. During this time, Gallows and Anderson helped Styles in his feud with Reigns, with Styles at first reluctant for their help. Gallows and Anderson wrestled their first WWE match on the April 25 episode of Raw, defeating The Usos. On the May 30 episode of Raw, Styles would confront a returning John Cena who said the "new era" would have to go through him, before offering Styles his hand. Styles shook his hand, shortly before Gallows and Anderson interrupted. As Styles and Cena appeared ready to fight Gallows and Anderson, Styles instead beat down Cena repeatedly, forming The Club.

On July 19, as part of WWE draft, both Gallows and Karl Anderson were drafted to Raw, while Styles was drafted to SmackDown, splitting up The Club. On July 24 at Battleground, The Club wrestled together for the final time, in a loss to Cena and Enzo and Cass. Gallows and Anderson then dropped Styles from the group and resumed feuding with The New Day, leading up to a SummerSlam match for the WWE Tag Team Championship, which they won by disqualification because of show guest Jon Stewart and a returning Big E getting involved. At Clash of Champions, Gallows and Anderson failed to win the titles. In November, Gallows and Anderson were announced as part of Team Raw for the 10–on–10 Survivor Series Tag Team Elimination match at Survivor Series, which they won. On the January 18, 2017, episode of Raw, Gallows and Anderson appeared to defeat Cesaro and Sheamus by pinfall for the Raw Tag Team Championship; however, due to Sheamus having hit the referee, the decision was reversed to a disqualification, leading to them winning the match but not the title. On the Royal Rumble preshow, Gallows and Anderson defeated Cesaro and Sheamus to win the Raw Tag Team Championship for the first time. They lost the title to the returning Hardy Boyz at WrestleMania 33 in a fatal four-way tag team ladder match. At the Payback kick-off show on April 30, Gallows and Anderson lost to Enzo and Cass. For the rest of 2017, Gallows and Anderson were mostly off television, only appearing sporadically on Raw and mainly being relegated to Main Event.

On the January 1, 2018 Raw, the duo turned face, in effect this marked Gallows' face turn for the first time since 2010, by appearing as former Bullet Club stablemate Finn Bálor's surprise tag team partners. After a brief feud, they lost to The Revival at the Royal Rumble pre-show. At WrestleMania 34 on April 8, Anderson and Gallows competed in the André the Giant Memorial Battle Royal, but did not win. On April 17, Gallows and Anderson were both drafted to SmackDown as part of Superstar Shake-up. On the May 22 episode of SmackDown, Gallows and Anderson defeated The Usos to become number one contenders for the SmackDown Tag Team Championship, but they failed to win the title from The Bludgeon Brothers on the Money in the Bank pre-show and also lost a rematch on the June 19 episode of SmackDown. At WrestleMania 35 in April 2019, Anderson and Gallows wrestled in their second André the Giant Memorial Battle Royal, but again did not win.

==== The O.C. (2019–2020) ====
On the April 29 episode of Raw, Gallows and Anderson returned to the Raw brand, losing to The Usos. As of that match, they had not won a match on television since they defeated The Usos in May 2018.

In July 2019, it was reported that Gallows and Anderson had re-signed with WWE to five-year contracts. After he lost a United States Championship match to Ricochet, Gallows and Anderson helped Styles attack Ricochet, and reuniting The club as heels. On the July 22 episode of Raw, The club was renamed The O.C., which means "Original Club". On the July 29 episode of Raw, Gallows and Anderson became two-time Raw Tag Team Champions by defeating The Revival and The Usos in a triple threat tag team match. They held the titles for a mere three weeks before losing them to Seth Rollins and Braun Strowman.

At Crown Jewel, Gallows and Anderson defeated eight other teams to win the WWE Tag Team World Cup. Gallows competed in the men's Royal Rumble match at the namesake pay-per-view, entering at No. 24 before being eliminated by Edge. He and Anderson appeared at WrestleMania 36 during Styles' Boneyard match against The Undertaker.

On April 15, 2020, Gallows (along with Anderson) was released from his WWE contract as part of budget cuts stemming from the COVID-19 pandemic.

=== Return to Impact Wrestling (2020–2022) ===
On July 18, 2020, Gallows and Anderson announced that they had signed two-year contracts with Impact Wrestling (formerly TNA) and would be appearing at Slammiversary. At the event, Gallows (reverting to his Doc Gallows in ring name) and Anderson, now known as The Good Brothers, appeared at the end of the show helping Eddie Edwards fend off Ace Austin and Madman Fulton before celebrating with Edwards, establishing themselves as fan favorites in the process. At Bound for Glory, Gallows and Anderson competed in a Four-way tag team match for the Impact World Tag Team Championship which was won by The North. At Turning Point, Gallows and Anderson defeated The North to win the Impact World Tag Team Championship for the first time. On the December 16 episode of Impact Wrestling, Anderson pinned Chris Sabin by rolling Sabin up while pulling on Sabin's shorts for leverage. When Impact World Champion Rich Swann confronted Anderson about it, Anderson attacked him, turning heel in the process. Sabin and Alex Shelley then attacked Anderson but Gallows returned from injury and kicked Shelley in the head, turning heel as well. Anderson, Gallows and Kenny Omega laid out Swann and the MCMG and then reunited Bullet Club.

On the February 19, 2022, at No Surrender, the Good Brothers rejoined Bullet Club.

=== Return to the independent circuit (2020–2022) ===
Since departing WWE, the Good Brothers returned to the independent circuit. On August 1, 2020, Anderson and Gallows along with Rocky Romero promoted their first pay-per-view event called Talk 'N Shop A Mania. They held a second event later that year in November called Talk 'N Shop A Mania 2: Rise Of The Torturer.

On September 26, 2020, the Good Brothers won Lariato Pro Wrestling Guild's Lariato Pro Tag Team Championship by defeating Regenesis (Francisco Ciatso and Storm Thomas), their first title on the independent circuit.

=== All Elite Wrestling (2021) ===
Gallows with Anderson as The Good Brothers made their AEW debut at the end of AEW Dynamite New Year's Smash Night 1, saving Kenny Omega from Jon Moxley and making the "Too Sweet" hand gesture along with Omega and The Young Bucks. Gallows and Anderson were making appearances in AEW, due to a working relationship crossover deal with Impact Wrestling.

=== Return to NJPW (2021–2022) ===
In June 2021, it was announced that The Good Brothers would be returning to New Japan Pro Wrestling for the first time since early 2016 as part of the United States–based show NJPW Strong and would compete in its Tag Team Turbulence tournament. In the first round they defeated Clark Connors and T. J. Perkins. In the semi-finals they defeated Yuji Nagata and Ren Narita to advance to the tournament finals. In the finals, they defeated Violence Unlimited, which consisted of Brody King and Chris Dickinson, to win the tournament.

Gallows and Anderson appeared at Resurgence on August 14, they would defeat Jon Moxley and Nagata, his mystery partner. After the match, they were confronted by the Guerrillas of Destiny. On April 24, 2022, Gallows and Anderson rejoined Bullet Club at Windy City Riot, losing to the United Empire in a ten man tag team match.

=== Second return to WWE (2022–2025) ===
On the October 10, 2022, episode of Raw, Gallows and Anderson made their unannounced return to WWE as faces, saving AJ Styles from an attack by The Judgment Day after Styles fooled Finn Bálor into thinking he had joined them by embracing in a hug. The O.C decided to take the Judgment Day on at Crown Jewel on November 5, 2022. The team ended up with a loss because of Rhea Ripley. After the loss because of the interference, Mia Yim decided to join The O.C and help them fend off Ripley.

As part of the 2023 WWE Draft, Gallows was drafted to the SmackDown brand.

On the February 20, 2024, episode of NXT, Gallows and Anderson attacked Axiom and Nathan Frazer and Chase University (Andre Chase and Duke Hudson) after the two teams faced each other, turning heel for the first time since 2022 and marking Gallows and Anderson's return to NXT. Gallows and Anderson wrestled their return NXT match on the April 25 episode of NXT, defeating Edris Enofe and Malik Blade. On February 8, 2025, Gallows (along with Anderson) was released from WWE for the third time.

Gallows (along with Anderson) would later make an appearance at the 2026 WWE Hall of Fame to induct AJ Styles.

=== Second return to NJPW (2025–present) ===
On May 8, 2025, Gallows (reverting back to his Doc Gallows name) and Anderson announced that they would be returning to NJPW and will team with The Young Bucks against Bullet Club War Dogs (Clark Connors, David Finlay, Gabe Kidd, and Gedo) on May 9 at Resurgence. At the event, the Good Brothers and the Young Bucks defeated Bullet Club War Dogs.

=== Second return to independent circuit (2025–present) ===
On May 10, 2025, the Good Brothers made their debut for Maple Leaf Pro Wrestling (MLP) at Northern Rising, where they faced Bullet Club War Dogs (David Finlay and Drilla Moloney) with the match ending in a double countout. On July 5 at MLP Resurrection, the Good Brothers defeated Finlay and Moloney in a rematch.

=== Pro Wrestling Noah (2026–present) ===
On January 1, 2026 at Noah The New Year 2026, the Good Brothers made their Pro Wrestling Noah debut, defeating Kaito Kiyomiya and Jack Morris.

== Other media ==
Gallows and Karl Anderson along with fellow wrestler Rocky Romero run a podcast named Talk'N Shop.

=== Video games ===
Year	Title	Role	Notes
2008	WWE SmackDown vs. Raw 2009	Festus	
2009	WWE SmackDown vs. Raw 2010	Festus	
2010	WWE SmackDown vs. Raw 2011	Luke Gallows	
2016	WWE 2K17	Luke Gallows	Downloadable content
2017	WWE 2K18	Luke Gallows	
2018	WWE 2K19	Luke Gallows	
2019	WWE 2K20	Luke Gallows	
2023	WWE 2K23	Luke Gallows	Downloadable content
2024	WWE 2K24	Luke Gallows	
2025	WWE 2K25	Luke Gallows	

== Championships and accomplishments ==
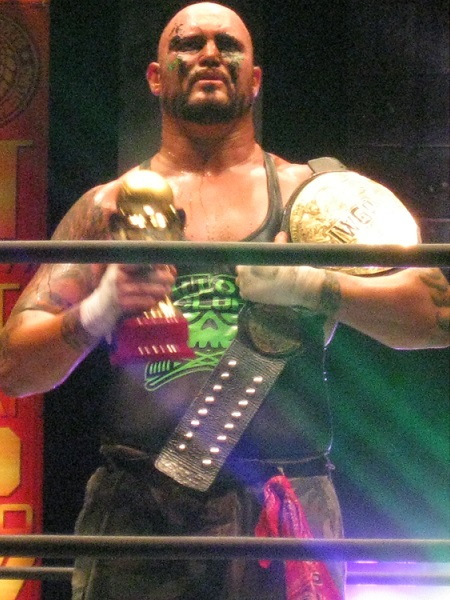
Gallows is a three-time IWGP Tag Team Champion.

- AAW: Professional Wrestling Redefined
  - AAW Tag Team Championship (1 time) – with Karl Anderson
- Atomic Legacy Wrestling
  - ALW Tag Team Championship (1 time) – with Karl Anderson
- American Pro Wrestling Alliance
  - APWA World Tag Team Championship (1 time) – with Knux
- FLEX Wrestling
  - FLEX Tag Team Championship (1 time, current) – with Karl Anderson
- Impact Wrestling
  - Impact World Tag Team Championship (3 times) – with Karl Anderson
  - Impact Year End Awards (3 times)
    - Finishing Move of the Year (2020) – Magic Killer (with Karl Anderson)
    - Moment of the Year (2020) – The Good Brothers' Impact debut at Slammiversary, shared with the other returns and debuts that night
    - Tag Team of the Year (2021) – with Karl Anderson
- Lariato Pro Wrestling Guild
  - Lariato Pro Tag Team Championship (1 time) – with Karl Anderson
- MCW Pro Wrestling
  - MCW Tag Team Championship (1 time) – with Karl Anderson
- Major League Wrestling
  - MLW World Tag Team Championship (1 time, current) – with Karl Anderson
- Maple Leaf Pro Wrestling
  - MLP Canadian Tag Team Championship (1 time, inaugural) – with Karl Anderson
- National Wrestling Alliance
  - NWA Southern Tag Team Championship (1 time) – with Iceberg
- National Wrestling League
  - NWL Heavyweight Championship (1 time)
- New Japan Pro-Wrestling
  - IWGP Tag Team Championship (3 times) – with Karl Anderson
  - World Tag League (2013) – with Karl Anderson
  - NJPW Strong Tag Team Turbulence Tournament (2021) – with Karl Anderson
- Rampage Pro Wrestling
  - RPW Heavyweight Championship (1 time)
- Pro Wrestling Illustrated
  - Ranked No. 65 of the top 500 wrestlers in the PWI 500 in 2016
- River City Wrestling
  - RCW Tag Team Championship (1 time) – with Knux
- The Crash
  - The Crash Tag Team Championship (1 time) – with Karl Anderson
- Vanguard Championship Wrestling
  - VCW Heavyweight Championship (1 time)
- Wrestling Observer Newsletter
  - Worst Gimmick (2012, 2013) Aces & Eights
- World Series Wrestling
  - WSW Tag Team Championship (2 times, current) – with Karl Anderson
- WWE
  - WWE Raw Tag Team Championship (2 times) – with Karl Anderson
  - WWE Tag Team World Cup (2019) – with Karl Anderson
- Other titles
  - Talk 'N Shop A Mania 24/7 Championship (1 time)
