= MLP Mayhem (pay-per-view event) =

2025 Maple Leaf Pro Wrestling event

Mayhem
- Promotional poster of the event
- Promotion: Maple Leaf Pro Wrestling
- Date: March 14–15, 2025
- City: Windsor, Ontario, Canada
- Venue: St. Clair College Sportsplex

Pay-per-view chronology
← Previous; Forged in Excellence	Next → Northern Rising

Mayhem was a two-night professional wrestling pay-per-view event produced by Maple Leaf Pro Wrestling (MLP).

The event took place at the St. Clair College Sportsplex in Windsor, Ontario, the same venue as the promotion's previous event Forged in Excellence and was streamed live across two days on Triller TV. It featured independent wrestlers and contracted wrestlers from various promotions around the world such as All Elite Wrestling, Pro Wrestling Noah, Qatar Pro Wrestling, National Wrestling Alliance, Total Nonstop Action Wrestling, New Japan Pro Wrestling, and WWE via their independent development program WWE ID.

== Production ==
=== Background ===
On January 30, 2025, MLP announced that in addition to Maple Leaf Pro Wrestling's first show at the Mattamy Athletic Centre at Maple Leaf Gardens in Toronto, Ontario, Canada, there would be a two-night event titled Mayhem which would take place on March 14, 2025 and March 15, 2025 In February 2025, MLP announced that WWE Hall of Famer Billy Gunn, NWA Worlds Heavyweight Champion Thom Latimer, AEW wrestlers Rich Swann, QT Marshall, Kevin Knight, Harley Cameron, and former NHL Detroit Red Wings forward Darren McCarty were scheduled to be featured at the event. On March 4, 2025, MLP announced that a tournament to crown the MLP Women's Canadian Champion would be held with opening matches taking place during Mayhem on both nights and the finals taking place at Northern Rising at the Mattamy Athletic Centre in Toronto, Ontario, Canada.

=== Storylines ===
Mayhem featured multiple professional wrestling matches that involved different wrestlers from pre-existing scripted feuds and storylines. Storylines were produced on various Border City Wrestling and Maple Leaf Pro Wrestling events.

== Results ==
Night 1 - March 14, 2025
No.	Results	Stipulations	Times
1^{P}	Taylor Rising defeated Beaa Moss by pinfall	MLP Women’s Canadian Championship Tournament Quarterfinal match	5:39
2^{P}	Serena Deeb defeated Aurora Teves by submission	MLP Women’s Canadian Championship Tournament Quarterfinal match	7:40
3	Intergalactic Jet Setters (Kevin Knight and Kushida) defeated Q. T. Marshall and Blake Christian by pinfall	Tag team match	14:10
4	Rohan Raja, Rohit Raju, Johnny Swinger and Raj Singh (with Johnny Bradford) defeated Billy Gunn, Mike Rollins, El Reverso and Bhupinder Gujjar by pinfall	Eight-man tag team match	10:50
5	Kylie Rae defeated Zoe Sager by pinfall	WWE ID Showcase / MLP Women’s Canadian Championship Tournament Quarterfinal match	7:36
6	Kaito Kiyomiya defeated Sheldon Jean by pinfall	Singles match	18:48
7	Mo Jabari (c) defeated Taiji Ishimori, Stu Grayson, Brent Banks, Michael AR Clark and Rich Swann by pinfall	Six-way match for the Jericho Cruise Oceanic Championship	11:28
8	Mike Bennett defeated Alex Zayne by pinfall	Singles match	14:32
9	Gisele Shaw defeated Laynie Luck by pinfall	MLP Women’s Canadian Championship Tournament Quarterfinal match	16:33
10	Thom Latimer (c) defeated Bishop Dyer by pinfall	Singles match for the NWA Worlds Heavyweight Championship	17:36
(c) / – the champion(s) heading into the match; P / – the match was broadcast on the pre-show

Night 2 - March 15, 2025
No.	Results	Stipulations	Times
1^{D}	Johnny Parisi and Raj Singh defeated Brett Banks and Mo Jabari by pinfall	Tag team match	—
2^{D}	Aurora Teves and Zoe Sager defeated Beaa Moss and Laynie Luck by pinfall	Tag team match	—
3	Blake Christian, Q. T. Marshall and Sheldon Jean defeated Bhupinder Gujjar, El Reverso and Psycho Mike by pinfall	Six-man tag team match	10:43
4	Kylie Rae defeated Taylor Rising by submission	MLP Women’s Canadian Championship Tournament Semifinal match	11:05
5	Alex Zayne defeated Kaito Kiyomiya, Taiji Ishimori and Stu Grayson by pinfall	Four-way match	9:21
6	Gisele Shaw defeated Serena Deeb by pinfall	MLP Women’s Canadian Championship Tournament Semifinal match	20:33
7	PCO defeated Michael AR Clark by pinfall	Street Fight	17:51
8	Billy Gunn and Bishop Dyer defeated Thom Latimer and Matt Cardona by pinfall	Tag team match	10:15
9	Rohan Raja (c) defeated Rich Swann by pinfall	Singles match for the PWA Champion’s Grail	14:12
10	Intergalactic Jet Setters (Kevin Knight and Kushida) defeated The Kingdom (Matt Taven and Mike Bennett) by pinfall	Tag team match	19:54
(c) / – the champion(s) heading into the match; D / – this was a dark match

=== Women's Canadian Championship tournament bracket ===
Quarterfinals; Mayhem (March 14)
Kylie Rae	Pin
Zoe Sager	7:36
Taylor Rising	Pin
Beaa Moss	5:39
Serena Deeb	Sub
Aurora Teves	7:40
Gisele Shaw	Pin
Laynie Luck	16:33

Semifinals; Mayhem (March 15)
Kylie Rae	Sub
Taylor Rising	11:05
Serena Deeb	Pin
Gisele Shaw	20:33

Final; Northern Rising (May 10)
Kylie Rae	Pin
Gisele Shaw	18:05
