= Gigi Dolin =

American professional wrestler (born 1997)

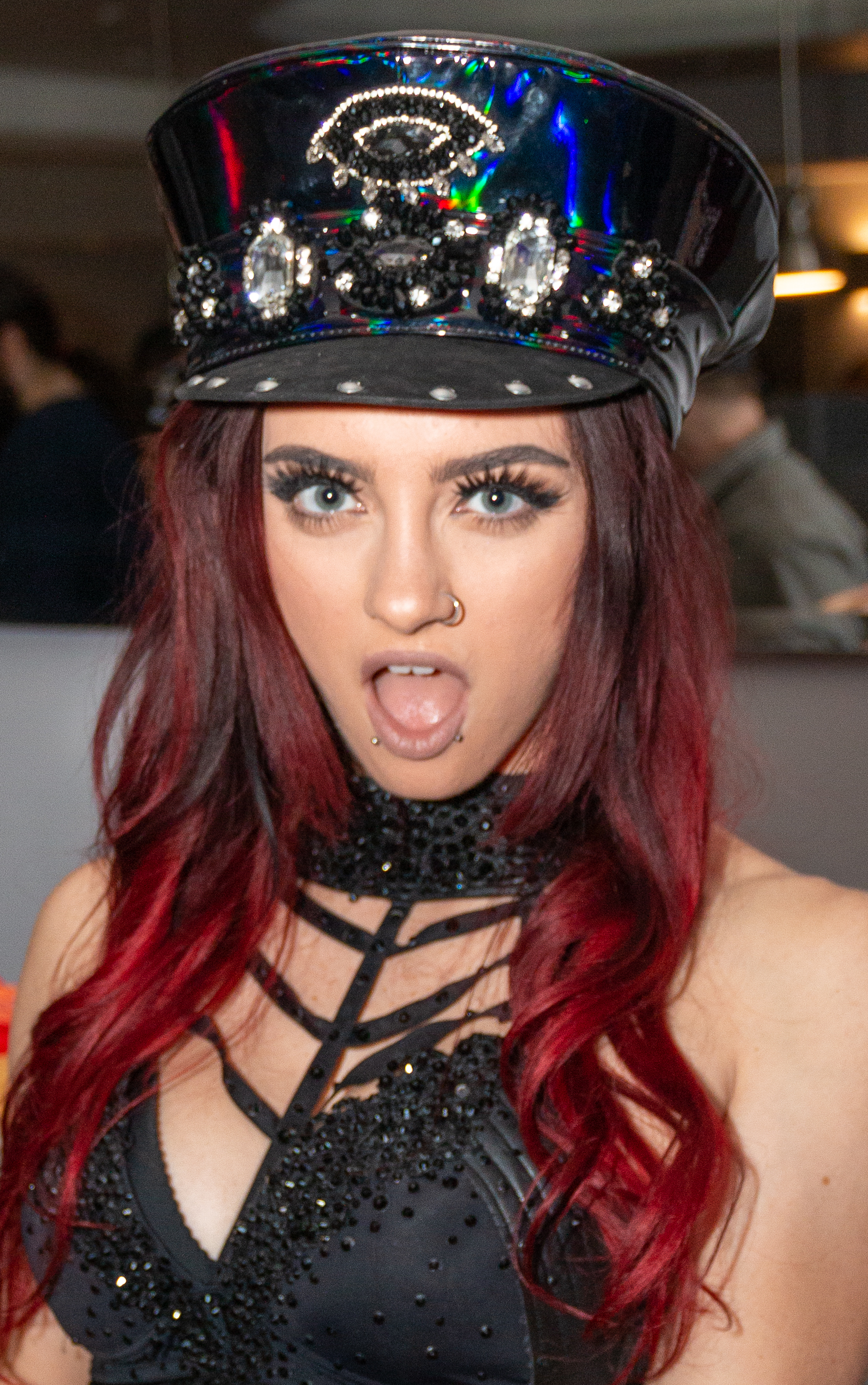
- Kelly in 2017

Personal information
- Born: Priscilla Lee Kelly; June 5, 1997 (age 29) Douglasville, Georgia, U.S.
- Spouse: Darby Allin (m. 2018; div. 2020)
- Life partners: Zachary Wentz (2023–present, engaged)

Professional wrestling career
- Ring name(s): Priscilla Kelly; Gigi Dolin
- Billed height: 5 ft 5 in (1.65 m)
- Billed weight: 137 lb (62 kg)
- Billed from: Atlanta, Georgia; Moon Creek, Georgia
- Trained by: Murder-1
- Debut: 2014

Priscilla Lee Kelly (born June 5, 1997) is an American professional wrestler and former reality television personality. She is currently performing on the independent circuit under her real name where she is the current MLP Canadian Women's Champion in her first reign. She is best known for her tenure in WWE, where she performed under the ring name Gigi Dolin and was a record-tying two-time NXT Women's Tag Team Champion.

Kelly also worked for Shine Wrestling, where she is the inaugural Shine Nova Champion.

== Early life ==
Priscilla Lee Kelly was born into a family of Irish Traveller descent in Douglasville, Georgia, on June 5, 1997. She left school at the age of 12. When she was 14 years old, she took part in the first season of the reality show My Big Fat American Gypsy Wedding, in which she was the main focus of the episode "14 and Looking for Mr. Right". She would later say that the program had misrepresented her. Her autistic younger brother, Miles, introduced her to professional wrestling. She said her motivation in wrestling is to give her brother a better life.

== Professional wrestling career ==
=== Independent circuit (2015–2021) ===
Kelly made her professional wrestling debut in March 2015 in a tag team match, where she and Devyn Nicole lost to Amanda Rodriguez and Amber O'Neal. In June, she was defeated by Kiera Hogan. In May 2016, she was defeated by Kimber Lee. In December 2016, she defeated Tessa Blanchard. In September 2016, Kelly made her Women Superstars Uncensored debut where she and Nevaeh lost to Samantha Heights and Brittany Blake. At Breaking Barriers 4, she defeated Penelope Ford and Renee Michelle. In August 2017, she defeated Leva Bates. Later that month, she defended her Shine Nova title against Jordynne Grace. In December, Kelly, Cheerleader Melissa and Mercedes Martinez defeated Laurel Van Ness, Delilah Doom and Deonna Purrazzo. In April 2018, she made her DDT Pro-Wrestling debut where she, Toru Owashi, and Kazuki Hirata were defeated by Saki Akai, Yukio Sakaguchi and Masahiro Takanashi.

In January 2017, Kelly made her Full Impact Pro debut in a loss to Aria Blake. At Heatstroke 2017, Kelly successfully defended her Shine Nova championship against Stormie Lee.

In May 2017, she made her Evolve debut at Evolve 95, losing to Allysin Kay.

She made her Style Battle debut defeating Dani J in August 2017.

In July 2019, Kelly defeated James Ellsworth to become the World Intergender Champion at Cactus League Wrestling's "Rated R Wrestling" event in Tucson, Arizona. In November 2019, Kelly debuted for Major League Wrestling as the evil Spider Lady; losing to Zeda Zhang via disqualification and attacking Zhang while unmasking.

==== Tampon incident ====
In December 2018, Kelly wrestled a match against Tuna for the Suburban Fight promotion in Los Angeles. During the match, with Tuna laid out on a steel chair, Kelly pulled out a bloody tampon from her tights and stuck it in Tuna's mouth. Footage of the match received little attention for over a week until fellow wrestler Gail Kim commented on Twitter in disgust, after which the footage went viral. Wrestling veterans such as Jim Ross, Angelina Love, and Tessa Blanchard also commented negatively, while Gregory Helms jokingly asked if it was a "First Blood Match".

Kelly defended the angle, stating that it took place in a bar that required audience members to be 21 or older and that it was simply for entertainment, confirming that the tampon's use was a scripted event in the match and that it was not actually a used tampon. She later commented that women are held to a double standard compared to men, citing Joey Ryan sticking a lollipop into numerous wrestlers' mouths after pulling it out of his tights. Her sentiments were echoed by Reby Sky. Figures such as Tommy Dreamer, Tazz, and Ryan came to Kelly's defense, all stating that she did her job and it worked. Road Dogg initially criticized her for the angle until Ryan called him out over similar angles during the Attitude Era, notably the infamous Mae Young "birthing a hand" angle, after which he publicly apologized to her.

Following her WWE release in 2025, Kelly revealed in an interview that the tampon was an idea she had had for some time and had to wait to work in an open-minded promotion to try it, admitting that while Tuna was fine with it, Kelly admitted that she probably wouldn't have gone for it if there was real menstrual blood on the tampon. Kelly even admitted that she was second-guessing on running the spot until getting support from Brody King before the show. Kelly admitted she had forgotten about it until she was at work at her regular job at GNC when the clip went viral, and took it personally from Kim about her remarks until Lita messaged her and told her it was OK. Kelly and Kim have since met in person and cleared any differences over the incident.

=== Shine (2016–2019) ===
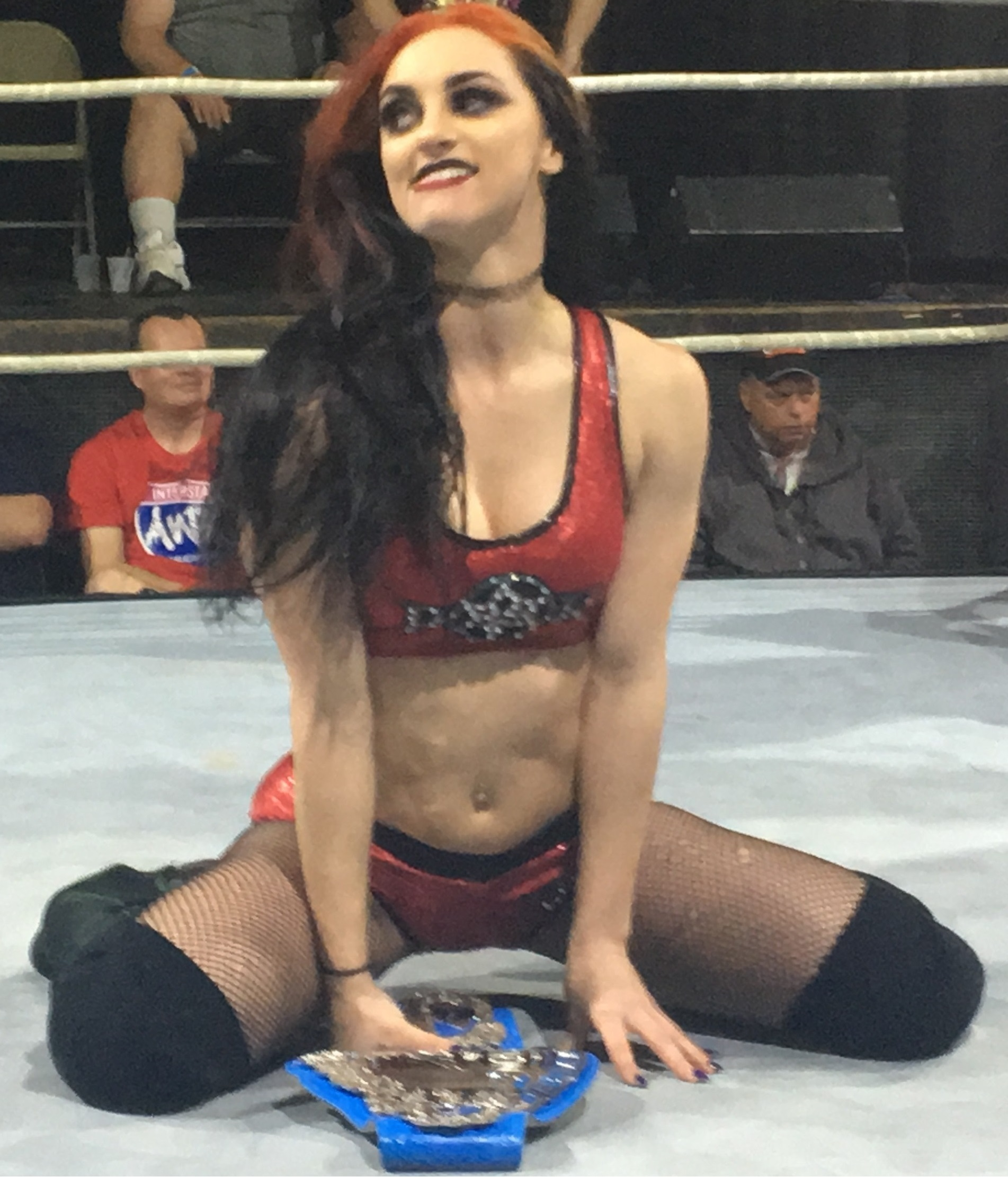
Kelly as Shine Nova Champion in 2018

In September 2016, Kelly made her Shine Wrestling debut at Shine 37 defeating Dominique Fabiano. Later that night, Kelly and Fabiano were defeated by then Shine Tag Team Champions, Jayme Jameson and Marti Belle. At Shine 39, Kelly was defeated by Malia Hosaka. In July 2017, Kelly became the inaugural Shine Nova Champion after winning the Shine Nova Championship Tournament where she defeated Veda Scott in the first round, Leah Vaughan in the second round, Kiera Hogan in the semifinals, and Candy Cartwright in the tournament finals. At Shine 46, she defeated Santana Garrett to retain the Nova championship. At Shine 49, Kelly lost the Nova title to Candy Cartright. At Shine 51, she defeated Holidead.

=== Tokyo Joshi Pro Wrestling (2018–2019) ===
Kelly made her debut for the Japanese Promotion Tokyo Joshi Pro Wrestling in April 2018, losing to the Dragon Bombers (Maho Kurone & Rika Tatsumi) in a Tag Team Match alongside Hyper Misao. She has since worked matches on several occasions in Japan, all under the umbrella of the DDT Pro-Wrestling Promotion, her latest match being a loss in the Tokyo Princess of Princess Championship match against Miyu Yamashita on October 14. On October 10, 2018, Ethan Page, MAO, Mike Bailey and Kelly defeated Jun Kasai, Akito, Masahiro Takanashi and Saki Akai.

=== All Elite Wrestling (2019–2020) ===
On August 31, 2019, Kelly made a surprise appearance at All Out, participating in the Casino Battle Royale which she failed to win. On the January 22, 2020, episode of Dynamite, Kelly faced Britt Baker in a losing effort.

=== WWE (2021–2025) ===
==== Toxic Attraction (2021–2023) ====
On July 30, 2018, it was announced by WWE that Kelly would be a participant in the second Mae Young Classic tournament. She lost against Deonna Purrazzo in the first round.

On January 20, 2021, WWE announced they had signed Kelly, where she would be competing on the NXT brand under the ring name Gigi Dolin and debut with her participation in the Women's Dusty Rhodes Tag Team Classic. She teamed up with fellow new signee Cora Jade in the tournament, where they faced and lost to The Way (Candice LeRae and Indi Hartwell) in the first round. On the July 27 episode of NXT, Dolin would form an alliance with Mandy Rose and Jacy Jayne, dubbed as Toxic Attraction. At Halloween Havoc, Dolin and Jayne defeated Io Shirai and Zoey Stark, and Indi Hartwell and Persia Pirotta in a triple threat tag team Scareway to Hell Ladder match to win the NXT Women's Tag Team Championship. On the November 16 episode of NXT 2.0, Dolin joined Jacy Jayne, Mandy Rose and Dakota Kai in a WarGames match at NXT WarGames to face Team Raquel (Raquel González, Kay Lee Ray, Cora Jade and Io Shirai). At the event, Toxic Attraction and Kai were defeated by Team Raquel.

On February 5, 2022 at NXT: Vengeance Day, Dolin and Jayne retained their NXT Women's Tag Team Championship against Indi Hartwell and Persia Pirotta. On the NXT Stand & Deliver Kickoff, Gigi and Jacy lost the NXT Women's Tag Team Championship to Dakota Kai and Raquel González with the help from Wendy Choo's interference, ending their reign at 158 days. However, they regained the titles with the help of Mandy Rose's distraction three days later.

On July 5 at NXT: The Great American Bash, Gigi and Jacy lost the NXT Women's Tag Team Championship to Roxanne Perez and Cora Jade. After the titles were vacated, Dolin and Jayne participated in a Fatal Four-Way Elimination Match on the August 2 episode of NXT 2.0, against Ivy Nile and Tatum Paxley, Yulisa Leon and Valentina Feroz, and Katana Chance and Kayden Carter. Dolin and Jayne were part of the final two teams in the match but eventually lost to Chance and Carter.

On the August 19, 2022, episode of SmackDown, Dolin made her main roster debut alongside Jacy Jayne as participants in the WWE Women's Tag Team Championship Tournament. They would win the first match but were forced out of the tournament due to an injury suffered by Dolin. Dolin and Jayne made their return to SmackDown in a losing effort against new WWE Women's Tag Team Champions Aliyah and Raquel Rodriguez.

On December 14, Rose was released by WWE, turning Toxic Attraction into a tag team. At NXT: New Year's Evil on January 10, 2023, Dolin and Jayne were declared co-winners of a 20-woman battle royal after eliminating each other simultaneously, earning an NXT Women's Championship match against Roxanne Perez in a triple threat match at NXT Vengeance Day, where Perez successfully retained her title.

==== Various feuds (2023–2025) ====
On the February 7, 2023, edition of NXT, during a Ding Dong, Hello! segment hosted by Bayley, Dolin and Jayne appeared to reconcile. But Jayne turned on Dolin, hitting Dolin with a "Thirst Kick". Jayne then stomped a sobbing Dolin though the door of the Ding Dong, Hello! set, ending Toxic Attraction. Dolin faced Jayne at NXT Roadblock on March 7 with Dolin winning the match. The former best friends went on to face each other again on May 2, where Jayne pinned Dolin. Their feud finally culminated on the May 30, 2023, edition of NXT where Dolin defeated Jayne in a Weaponized Steel Cage match.

On the June 27 edition of NXT, Dolin defeated Kiana James. After the match, James attacked Dolin and humiliated her by dumping multiple cans of paint on her. Dolin responded on the July 4 episode of NXT by vandalizing James's office. Dolin and James's feud culminated in a rematch on the July 18 edition of NXT where Dolin was defeated. The following month, Dolin competed in a Fatal Four-Way match to determine the number one contender for the NXT Women's Championship but was pinned and defeated again by James. In the fall, Dolin began a feud with Blair Davenport which culminated in Dolin being defeated by Davenport in a Lights Out match at Halloween Havoc. Dolin would wrestle sporadically for the next few months, typically in losing efforts on Main Event and NXT Level Up to the likes of Cora Jade, Chelsea Green, Izzi Dame and Xia Li. On the March 12, 2024 episode of NXT, Dolin faced Arianna Grace with the stipulation that if Grace won, she will give Dolin a makeover to be a "proper lady". Grace defeated Dolin by disqualification after the referee caught Dolin giving a low blow to Grace. This was one of the first instances where a women's WWE match ended with a low blow disqualification. The angle was abruptly dropped when Dolin was reportedly sidelined in June after suffering a serious knee injury. Dolin later made an on-screen appearance at NXT Halloween Havoc on October 27 as the narrator of the event's opening video.

Dolin returned from injury on the November 26 episode of NXT to save Tatum Paxley from Fatal Influence (Jacy Jayne, Fallon Henley and Jazmyn Nyx), forming an alliance with Paxley while reigniting her feud with Jayne. On the following week, Dolin and Paxley lost to Jayne and Nyx in a tag team match. After the match, Shotzi saved the pair from a beatdown by Fatal Influence. On January 7, 2025, Dolin, Paxley and Shotzi faced Fatal Influence in a six-woman tag team match at NXT: New Year's Evil, where Dolin's team emerged victorious. At the NXT Stand & Deliver pre-show on April 19, Dolin and Paxley won a Fatal four-way tag team elimination match to become the #1 contenders for the WWE Women's Tag Team Championship but failed to defeat Liv Morgan and Raquel Rodriguez for the titles on the April 22 episode of NXT. On May 2, 2025, Dolin was released from WWE, ending her four-year tenure with the company and effectively ending the alliance of Dolin, Paxley and Shotzi, the latter of whom would also depart the company upon the expiry of her contract.

=== Total Nonstop Action Wrestling (2025) ===
On the March 15, 2025 taping of Impact!, Kelly, as Gigi Dolin, made her Total Nonstop Action Wrestling (TNA) debut appearance with Tatum Paxley to demand a title match against TNA Knockouts World Tag Team Champions Ash by Elegance and Heather by Elegance but failed to win the titles the following week. On the April 17 episode of Impact!, Dolin and Paxley won their first TNA match by defeating Heather By Elegance and Maggie Lee in a tag team match.

=== Return to independent circuit (2025–present) ===
After being released by WWE, Kelly returned to going by her real name and returned to performing on the independent circuit. Kelly made her first post-WWE appearance for Wrestling Revolver at their event Cage of Horror 4, where she faced her real life fiancé Zachary Wentz. During the match, Kelly suffered a legitimate leg injury, and the bout was ruled a no-contest. It was later revealed that the injury was not serious. On September 16 episode of MLP Mayhem, Kelly defeated Gisele Shaw for the MLP Canadian Women's Championship.

=== Return to Major League Wrestling (2025–present) ===
On the October 4, 2025, Slaughterhouse event, Kelly made her first return to MLW since 2020. Appearing via video package, Kelly confronted Shotzi, challenging her to a match at Don Gato Tequila, which resulted in a loss. At Battle Riot, she would wrestle Shotzi again, resulting in another loss.

== Professional wrestling persona and style ==
Kelly's gimmick was initially based on her past and appearance on My Big Fat American Gypsy Wedding, leading her to use the nicknames "Gypsy Princess" and "Gypsy Queen". However, her persona has since adopted more of a gothic and sexual tone, and is now more based on a succubus. She uses the nickname "Hell's Favorite Harlot", and is known for using tactics such as biting and licking opponents during matches as a way to psyche them out. She has often been compared physically to WWE wrestler Paige, who also licked her opponents. Her main finisher is the Gigi Driver, which is an Abdominal stretch driver. As well as being a professional wrestler, Kelly is also a valet and most notably valeted Austin Theory.

== Other media ==
Dolin made her video game debut as a playable character in WWE 2K23, and later appeared in WWE 2K24.

== Personal life ==
On November 21, 2018, Kelly married fellow professional wrestler Samuel Ratsch, who is best known by his ring name Darby Allin. She announced in August 2020 that they were divorcing. During an interview on Vickie Guerrero's podcast four months later, she confirmed that she and Allin were no longer married but remained friends.

Kelly is now in a relationship with professional wrestler Zachary Wentz. They got engaged in October 2023.

== Championships and accomplishments ==
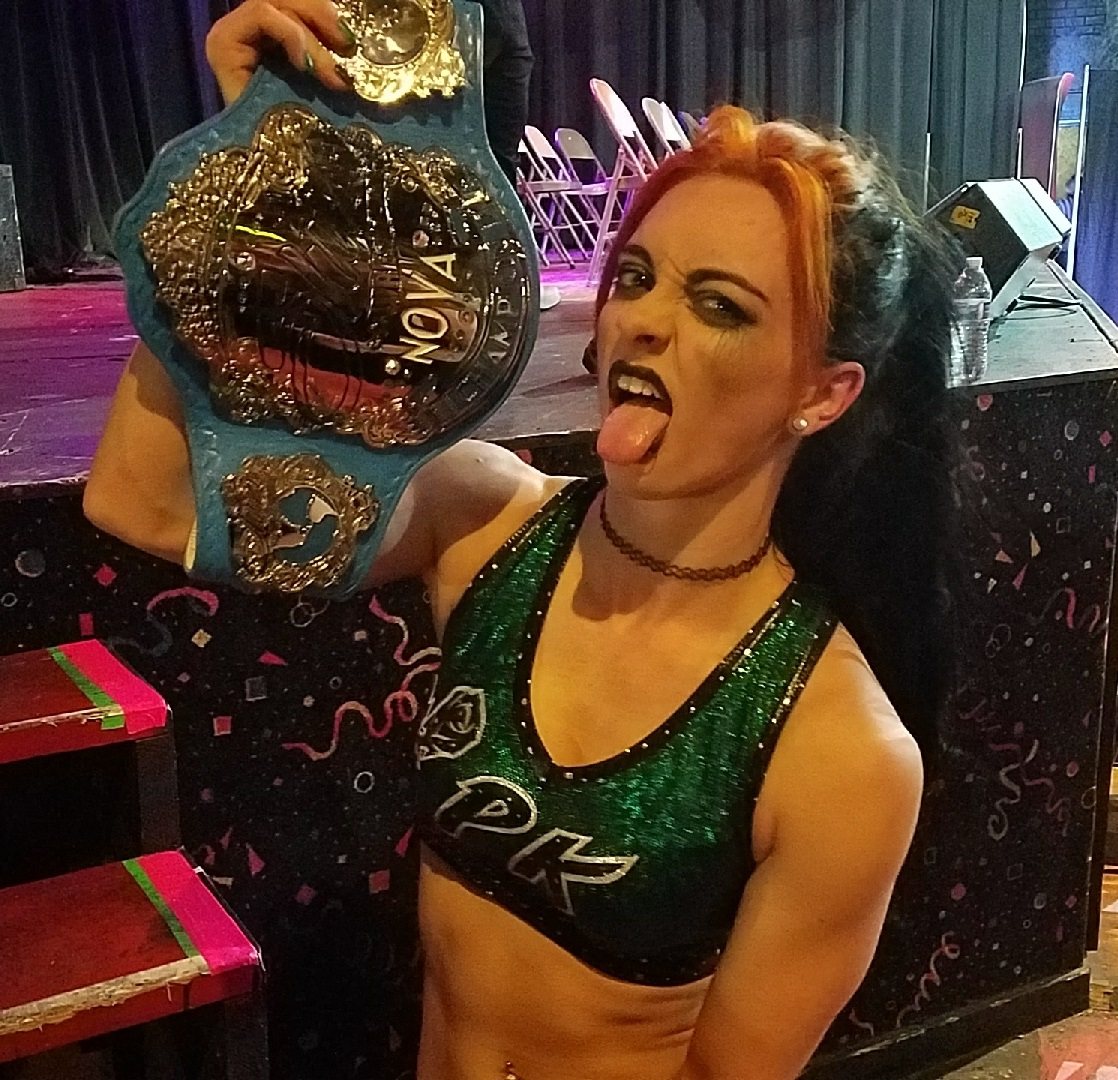
She is a former and the inaugural Shine Nova Champion

- Adrenaline Championship Wrestling
  - ACW Fire Women's Championship (1 time)
- Arizona Wrestling Federation
  - AWF Women's Championship (1 time)
- Destiny World Wrestling
  - Destiny Women's Championship (1 time)
- F1RST Wrestling
  - F1RST Wrestling Uptown VFW Championship (1 time)
- Georgia Premier Wrestling
  - Together We Fight Tournament (1 time) – with Chip Day
- Maple Leaf Pro Wrestling
  - MLP Women's Canadian Championship (1 time, current)
- Metroplex Wrestling
  - MPX Women's Championship (1 time, current)
- Pro Wrestling Illustrated
  - Ranked No. 38 of the top 100 female wrestlers in the PWI Women's 100 in 2020
  - Ranked No. 14 of the top 100 Tag Teams in the PWI Tag Team 100 in 2022 – with Toxic Attraction
- Rogue Wrestling
  - Rogue Tag Team Championship (1 time) – with Vipress
- Shine Wrestling
  - Shine Nova Championship (1 time, inaugural)
  - SHINE Nova Championship Inaugural Tournament (2017)
- WWE
  - NXT Women's Tag Team Championship (2 times) – with Jacy Jayne
