= MLP Northern Rising =

Maple Leaf Pro Wrestling pay-per-view

Northern Rising
- Promotions: Maple Leaf Pro Wrestling
- First event: 2025
- Last event: 2026

Northern Rising is an annual professional wrestling pay-per-view produced by the Canadian promotion Maple Leaf Pro Wrestling (MLP). The event was established in 2025.

== History ==
On May 10, 2025, MLP held its first show at the Mattamy Athletic Centre at Maple Leaf Gardens in Toronto, Ontario, Canada titled Northern Rising. The event featured the final rounds of a tournament to crown the inaugural MLP Women's Canadian Champion with the winner of the tournament being Gisele Shaw who defeated Kylie Rae.

During Global Wars Canada on March 27, 2026, MLP announced a television deal with The Sports Network (TSN) that will see a weekly television show, MLP Mayhem, begin airing in July 2026. On March 28, 2026 during the Uprising pay-per-view, Maple Leaf Pro Wrestling would announce television tapings for the show which are set to take place on June 12, 2026, June 13, 2026, August 7, 2026, and August 8, 2026 at St. Clair College in Windsor, Ontario, Canada.

On April 20, 2026, Maple Leaf Pro Wrestling announced that the show would air in a seasonal format with 12 episodes being taped for the first season. On April 25, 2026, Maple Leaf Pro Wrestling would announce that interim MLP Canadian Champion Stu Grayson, Jay Lethal, the New Age Outlaws (Road Dogg and Billy Gunn), Bishop Dyer, Blake Christian, Rohan Raja, MLP Canadian Women's Champion Gisele Shaw, Rhino, and Dani Luna would participate during the first two tapings.

On June 12, 2026, MLP announced that Mayhem would premiere on July 15, 2026 on TSN2 at Midnight Eastern Standard Time. On July 10, 2026, MLP announced that they had signed a streaming deal with MyAEW to air Mayhem worldwide.

On July 13, 2026, MLP announced that they would make its return to Toronto for the second annual Northern Rising pay-per-view on October 3, 2026.

== Events ==
Event #		Date	City	Venue	Main event	Ref.
1	Northern Rising (2025)	May 10, 2025	Toronto, Ontario, Canada	Mattamy Athletic Centre at Maple Leaf Gardens	Josh Alexander vs. Matt Cardona vs. PCO vs. vs. Rhyno vs. Billy Gunn vs. El Phantasmo vs. Raj Dhesi vs. Q. T. Marshall vs. Rich Swann vs. Psycho Mike vs. Bishop Dyer vs. Sheldon Jean, Bhupinder Gujjar vs. Johnny Parisi vs. Michael Allen Richard Clark vs. Alex Zayne vs. Mo Jabari vs. Rohan Raja vs. Brent Banks vs. El Reverso in a Gauntlet for the Gold match to crown the inaugural MLP Canadian Champion	
2	Northern Rising (2026)	October 3, 2026	Toronto, Ontario, Canada	Mattamy Athletic Centre at Maple Leaf Gardens	Adam Copeland vs. Steve Maclin in a street fight	
