= Gisele Shaw =

Filipina professional wrestler (born 1989)

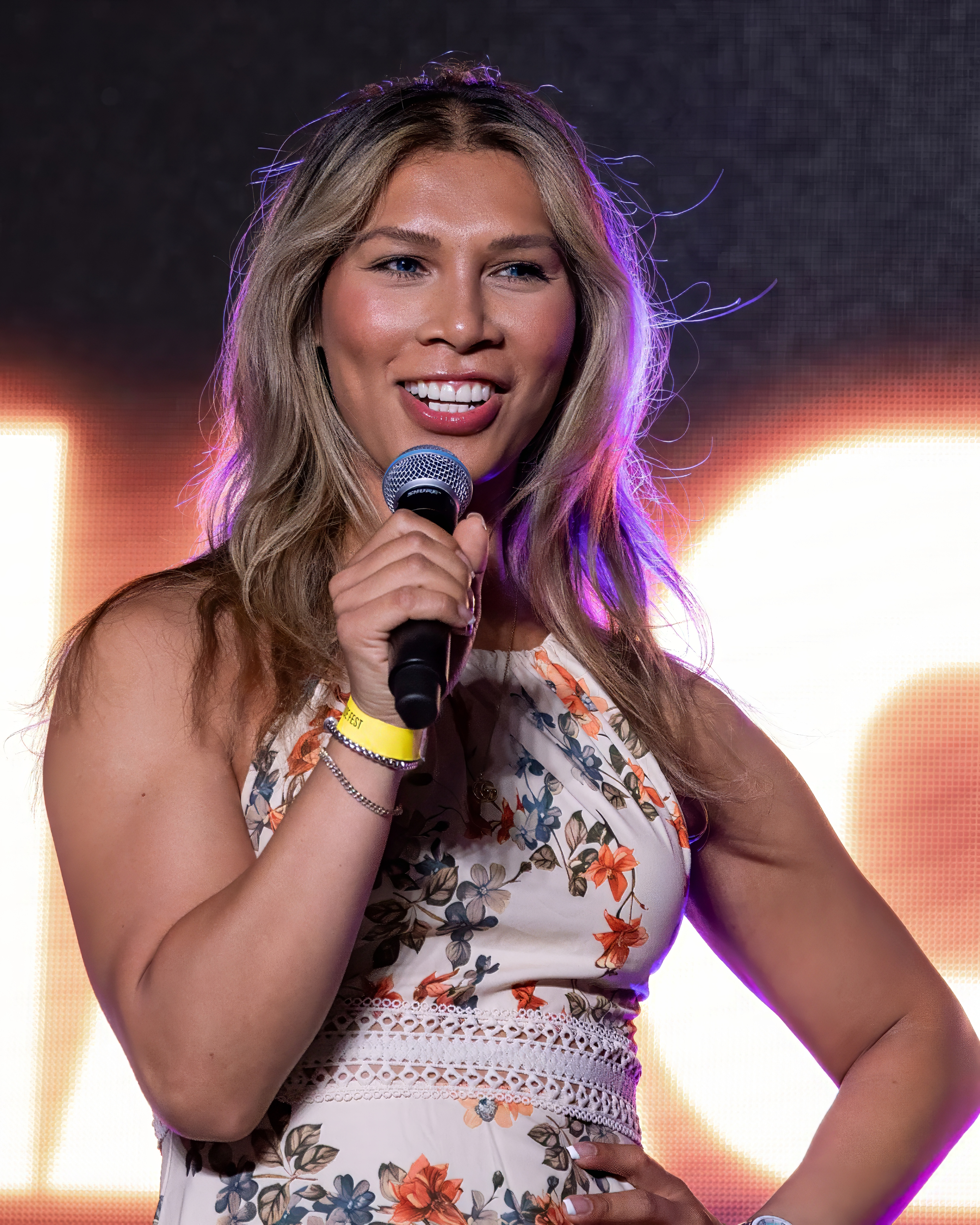
- Shaw in 2025

Personal information
- Born: Gisele Mayordo; 30 October 1989 (age 36) Toledo, Cebu, Philippines

Professional wrestling career
- Ring name(s): Azteca; Gisele Shaw; Reyna Reyes
- Billed height: 5 ft 7 in (1.70 m)
- Billed weight: 130 lb (9.3 st)
- Billed from: Toledo, Cebu, Philippines
- Trained by: Lance Storm
- Debut: January 2015

Gisele Mayordo (born 30 October 1989), known professionally as Gisele Shaw, is a Filipino-Canadian professional wrestler. She is signed to National Wrestling Alliance (NWA), where she was the NWA World Women's Television Championship. She is best known for her time with Total Nonstop Action Wrestling (TNA) and Maple Leaf Pro Wrestling (MLP), where she was the inaugural and longest reigning MLP Canadian Women's Champion.

== Professional wrestling career ==
=== Early career (2015–2018) ===
Mayordo made her pro wrestling debut during January 2015 using Gisele Shaw as her ring name. She wrestled extensively in Canada in promotions including High Impact Wrestling, Border City Wrestling, All-Star Wrestling, Prairie Wrestling Alliance and others. She won her first title while in Pro Wrestling Eclipse, where she captured the PWE Flame Championship on February 10, 2018, at PWE February Frenzy, defeating Stacy Thibault. She lost the title nine months later at PWE November Bash in a three-way match against Beautiful Beaa and Jewells Malone. She went on to win her second title in Crossfire Wrestling, where she won the CW Women's Championship in a triple-threat match against Beautiful Beaa and Jody Threat.

=== Revolution Pro Wrestling (2019–2024) ===
On June 9, 2019, Shaw made her Revolution Pro Wrestling debut at RevPro Live in Southampton 8, defeating Zoe Lucas. After losing her second RevPro match to Seleziya Sparx, Shaw began a six-match winning streak from October to December as she defeated the likes of Mercedes Martinez, Dani Luna, Tessa Blanchard, Bobbi Tyler, Shanna, and lastly Zan Phoenix. Due to this impressive two month long winning streak, Shaw earned an opportunity to face Undisputed British Women's Champion Zoe Lucas at RevPro New Year's Revolution but was unsuccessful in her first attempt. Despite her shortcomings, Shaw earned another opportunity for the championship after winning a #1 contenders four way on January 10, 2020, that also involved Debbie Keitel, Shanna, and Kasey Owens. Contrary to her first attempt, Shaw defeated champion Zoe Lucas on February 14, to become new British Women's Champion for the first time. Over the course of her 359-day title reign, Shaw defended her title against the likes of Bobbi Tyler, Bea Priestley, Aleah James, Little Miss Roxxy, and Jamie Hayter. The latter of whom ended Shaw's near year long reign as champion on February 7, 2021.

Despite losing the British Women's Championship, after Hayter no-showed a RevPro event to attend a WWE tryout, Shaw defeated Zoe Lucas for the newly vacated championship at RevPro Live At The Cockpit 51, thus becoming a two-time champion. While champion, Shaw entered into the Queen of the Ring tournament where she made it all the way to the semifinals where she lost to Hyan. After failing to win the tournament, Shaw began defending the British Women's Championship regularly again as she defeated the likes of Hyan (twice), Mariah May, and Lizzy Evo. Shaw's second reign as champion came to an end at 126 days after losing to Alex Windsor at RevPro Live At The NOTpit 55 on November 7.

Shaw would return to the promotion for RevPro's 12th Anniversary Show on August 24, 2024 in a 10-woman tag match, teaming with Debbie Keitel, Rhio, Kanji and Nightshade in a losing effort against the Cut Throat Collective (Alex Windsor, Lizzy Evo, Mercedes Blaze, Nina Samuels and Starfire Reed).

=== Progress Wrestling (2019–present) ===
Shaw made her Progress Wrestling debut at Chapter 93: Cheer Up Juice, in a losing effort against Dani Luna in a four way which also included Jody Threat and Yuu. Her next match was also a losing effort as she and Luna challenged Jinny for the Progress World Women's Championship in a three-way match. Shaw picked up her first win in Progress on February 23, 2020, against Chakara before going on a year long hiatus.

Shaw made her return to Progress on February 27, 2021, at Chapter 105: Bring The Thunder, losing to Kanji in a Progress Women's Championship #1 contender's match also involving Taonga, Millie McKenzie, Lana Austin, Mercedez Blaze and Alexxis Flacon. Soon after, due to COVID-19 travel restrictions, reigning Progress World Women's Championship Jinny was forced to vacate the title. Therefore, a three match series between Shaw and Kanji was announced to determine the new champion. Shaw lost the series 1–2 against Kanji.

After Kanji was forced to relinquish the Progress World Women's Championship, it was announced Gisele Shaw, Alexxis Falcon and Mercedez Blaze would compete for the vacant title at Chapter 117: Making Diamonds on August 14, 2021. At the event, Shaw defeated Blaze and Falcon to become the Progress World Women's Champion for the first time. Following this, Shaw began defending the title successfully against the likes of Laura Di Matteo, Rhio, Skye Smitson, Debbie Keitel, and Alexxis Falcon (twice), eventually losing the title to Kanji in a Two Out Of Three Falls match at Super Strong Style 16 Tournament Edition 2022, on June 5, 2022.

Shaw would return to the promotion in May 2026 to participate in the Super Strong Style 16 Tournament Edition 2026, defeating Skye Smitson first, and then Kanji, to make it to the finals, where she would lose to Rhio.

=== Women of Wrestling (2019) ===
Shaw made her Women of Wrestling debut on October 11, 2019, as a masked wrestler named Azteca. Later, she removed the mask and changed her ring name to Reyna Reyes, "the pearl of the Philippines". Throughout her tenure with WOW, she competed in a series of matches including singles matches against Kobra Moon, Jessie Jones, Holidead and The Beast. She later teamed with Princess Aussie in a tag match against Holidead & Voodoo Doll.

=== Impact Wrestling / Total Nonstop Action Wrestling (2018–2024) ===
==== Early appearances (2018) ====
On March 3, 2018, Shaw represented Canada's Border City Wrestling in the co-produced pay-per-view event One Night Only: March Breakdown, losing to Impact Wrestling legend Madison Rayne. Five months later, Shaw represented Destiny World Wrestling on August 25 at One Night Only: Bad Intentions, competing for the Impact Knockouts Championship held by Tessa Blanchard. Two months later, Shaw once again represented Border City Wrestling during the co-produced event One Night Only: BCW 25th Anniversary, where she lost a singles match against Impact representative Kiera Hogan.

==== The Quintessential Diva (2022) ====
Starting on the January 20, 2022 episode of Impact!, a vignette showcasing the debut of a new knockout calling herself "The Quintessential Diva". The next week's vignette revealed the new knockout to be Gisele Shaw as the vignettes continued for the next two weeks. On the February 10, episode of Before the Impact!, Shaw made her official debut confronting fellow newcomer Lady Frost after her match with Alisha Edwards. During that same episode it was announced that Shaw would make her official in-ring debut against Frost on the February 17 episode of Impact!, at which Shaw was victorious. On March 17 episode of Impact!, both Shaw and Frost competed in a three-way match for the AAA Reina de Reinas Championship and ROH Women's World Championship against the dual champion Deonna Purrazzo, however, Purrazzo successfully retained both of the titles.

On April 1, at Multiverse of Matches, Shaw alongside Frost challenged for the Impact Knockouts World Tag Team Championship in a four-way tag team match, however, were unsuccessful. Since June, Shaw has a short-lived alliances with the teams of The Influence (Madison Rayne and Tenille Dashwood) and later with VXT (Chelsea Green and Purrazzo). In November, Shaw introduced her executive stylist and content creator, Jai Vidal, who accompanied her to her matches. On November 10, during the main event of Impact!, Shaw challenged Jordynne Grace for the Impact Knockouts World Championship, however, was unsuccessful.

==== Alliance and final storylines (2023–2024) ====
On February 24, 2023, during the pre-show of No Surrender, Shaw found an ally in Savannah Evans, after Evans helped Shaw to defeat Purrazzo. On the March 9 episode of Impact!, Shaw challenged Mickie James for the Impact Knockouts World Championship, where she lost as Purrazzo helped James. This led into a match between Shaw and Purrazzo on March 24 at Sacrifice, where Purrazzo submitted Shaw. On May 26 at Under Siege, Shaw was defeated by Trinity. At Against All Odds, Shaw and Savannah Evans lost to Deonna Purrazzo and Trinity. At Emergence, Shaw and Evans competed in a Four-way tag team match for the Impact Knockouts World Tag Team Championship but failed to win the titles. At Victory Road, Shaw and Evans lost to MK Ultra (Killer Kelly and Masha Slamovich) in another championship match. At Bound for Glory, Shaw competed in the 20-person Intergender Call Your Shot Gauntlet which was won by Jordynne Grace. At Turning Point, Shaw defeated Alex Windsor. At Final Resolution, Shaw and Purrazzo lost to Trinity and Jordynne Grace.

On January 13, 2024, at Hard to Kill, Shaw won an Ultimate X match to become the #1 contender for the newly renamed TNA Knockouts World Championship. On the February 15, 2024 episode of TNA Impact, Shaw attacked Evans with the Ultimate X. On February 23 at No Surrender, Shaw failed to win the TNA Knockouts World Championship from Jordynne Grace.

After taking time off to recover from an injury, a series of vignettes featuring Gail Kim mentoring Shaw were aired, teasing a face turn. On May June 6, 2024 edition of TNA IMpact, Gisele Shaw made her return as a face, defeating Shazza McKenzie in her first match back. At the Countdown To Slammiversary pre-show, Shaw faced off against Xia Brookside, Tasha Steelz and Faby Apache, where Shaw landed her Denouement finishing move on Brookside before being thrown into a corner ring post by Steelz, who scored the winning pinfall instead. This would lead to a short feud between Shaw and Steelz, where Steelz would score a pinfall on Shaw using the ropes for leverage on the July 26th edition of TNA Xplosion and one final time on the August 15th edition of Impact where additional referees would be at ringside to prevent Steelz from cheating, leading to Shaw scoring the decisive win.

On September 4, 2024, it was announced that Gisele Shaw is no longer with TNA. Her final match with the company would take place on September 12, be in a losing effort against a debuting Heather Reckless.

=== Maple Leaf Pro Wrestling (2024–2026) ===
On September 11, 2024, it was announced that Shaw will face Athena, the longest reigning ROH Women's World Champion, for the title on the second night of Maple Leaf Pro Wrestling's (MLP) event Forged in Excellence on October 20. Before that, on October 19, at first night of Forged in Excellence, Shaw defeated Miyu Yamashita. During the match, Shaw was unsuccessful as Athena retained. On 14 March at Night 1 of Mayhem, Shaw defeated Laynie Luck to advance to the semifinals for the MLP Women's Canadian Championship tournament, and on March 15 at Night 2 of Mayhem she would defeat Serena Deeb to qualify for the finals. After her win, Kylie Rae, the other woman who qualified for the finals at Northern Rising, went out to congratulate Shaw, only for Shaw to attack Rae, turning heel in the process. At Northern Rising, Shaw (accompanied by TNA's The Personal Concierge) would defeat Rae to be crowned the inaugural MLP Women's Canadian Champion. On June 14 at Fantastic Fathers Shaw successfully defended her title against Kylie Rae at match-revenge and her first title defense. On July 5 at Resurrection, Shaw successfully defended her title against Shotzi Blackheart. She would go on to defeat Priscilla Kelly at Sacred Ground on September 5 in a Winner Take All match to both retain the MLP Women's Canadian Championship and win Kelly's Destiny World Wrestling Women's Championship. On October 27 at Reena Rumble, Shaw teaming with Josh Alexander defeated Kris Chambers and Taylor Rising in mixed tag team match.

On the two-night pay-per-view event for Global Wars Canada and Uprising, Shaw would first challenge Deonna Purrazzo for Purrazzo's ROH Women's Pure Championship in a losing effort on March 27, 2026, then on March 28 would put her title on the line against Purrazzo the next night in a successful defense. On April 17, at MLP Multiverse in Las Vegas, Shaw successfully defended her title in a fatal four-way against Persephone, Killer Kelly and Shotzi Blackheart. On July 15, at MLP Mayhem, Shaw successfully defended her title against Alice Crowley. On August 19, at MLP Mayhem, she successfully defended her title against Dani Luna. On September 16, at MLP Mayhem, Shaw lost her title against Priscilla Kelly. The following day, Shaw confirmed, via her X account, that she is leaving MLP after signing with National Wrestling Alliance.

=== National Wrestling Alliance (2025–present) ===
Shaw made her debut for the National Wrestling Alliance (NWA) at NWA Powerr tapings on December 12, unsuccessfully challenging Natalia Markova for the NWA World Women's Championship. The two would later form a team to defeat NWA Women's Television Champion Tiffany Nieves and Gretta. On the episode taped April 4 and airing May 1, 2026, Gisele Shaw defeated Tiffany Nieves to win the Women's Television title, the first trans woman to do so. On 12 September, NWA announced that Shaw had signed an exclusive contract with the promotion.

=== Consejo Mundial de Lucha Libre (2026) ===
Shaw made her debut for Consejo Mundial de Lucha Libre (CMLL) on the February 16, 2026 episode of Martes de Arena Mexico, successfully defending her MLP Women's Canadian Championship against Sanely.

== Other media ==
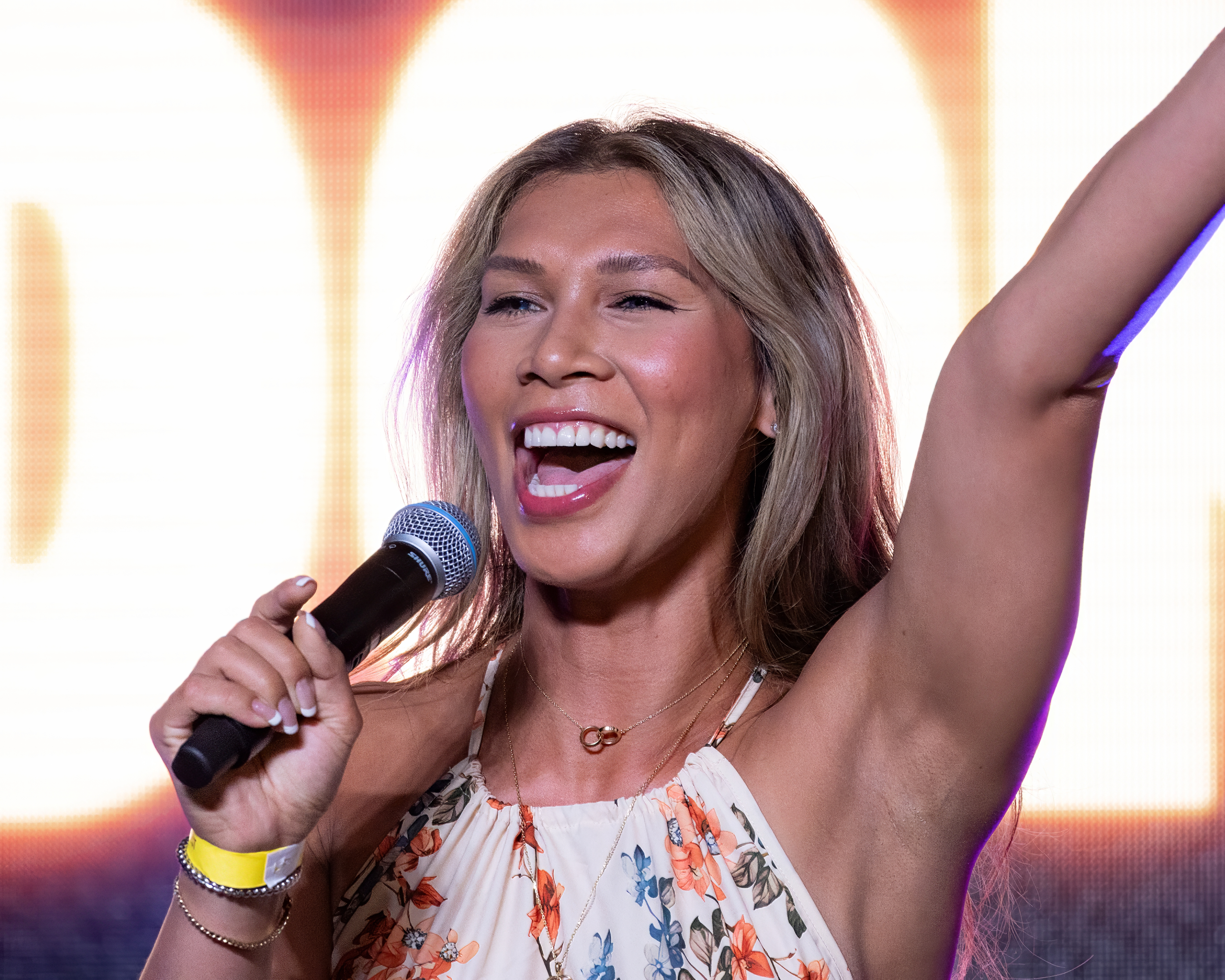
Shaw speaking at the Windsor-Essex Pride Fest, 2025

In April 2023, it was reported that Shaw would participate on the ninth season of The Amazing Race Canada, with Gail Kim as her partner. She and Kim would be the first team eliminated, on that season's first episode.

== Personal life ==
When Mayordo was 12 years old, she and her family relocated from Toledo, Cebu, Philippines, to Yellowknife, Northwest Territories, Canada. She transitioned at age 22 and came out as a transgender woman at the Pride Toronto event on June 24, 2022, at age 33.

== Filmography ==
Television
Year	Title	Role	Notes
2021	Pennyworth	Rowdy Rose Perkins	Episode: "The Bleeding Heart"
2023	The Amazing Race Canada	Herself	Contestant; Season 9

Film
Year	Title	Role	Notes
2016	Chokeslam	Wrestler	(uncredited)

Podcasts
Year	Title	Role	Notes
2025	Ring The Belle	Herself	1 episode

== Championships and accomplishments ==
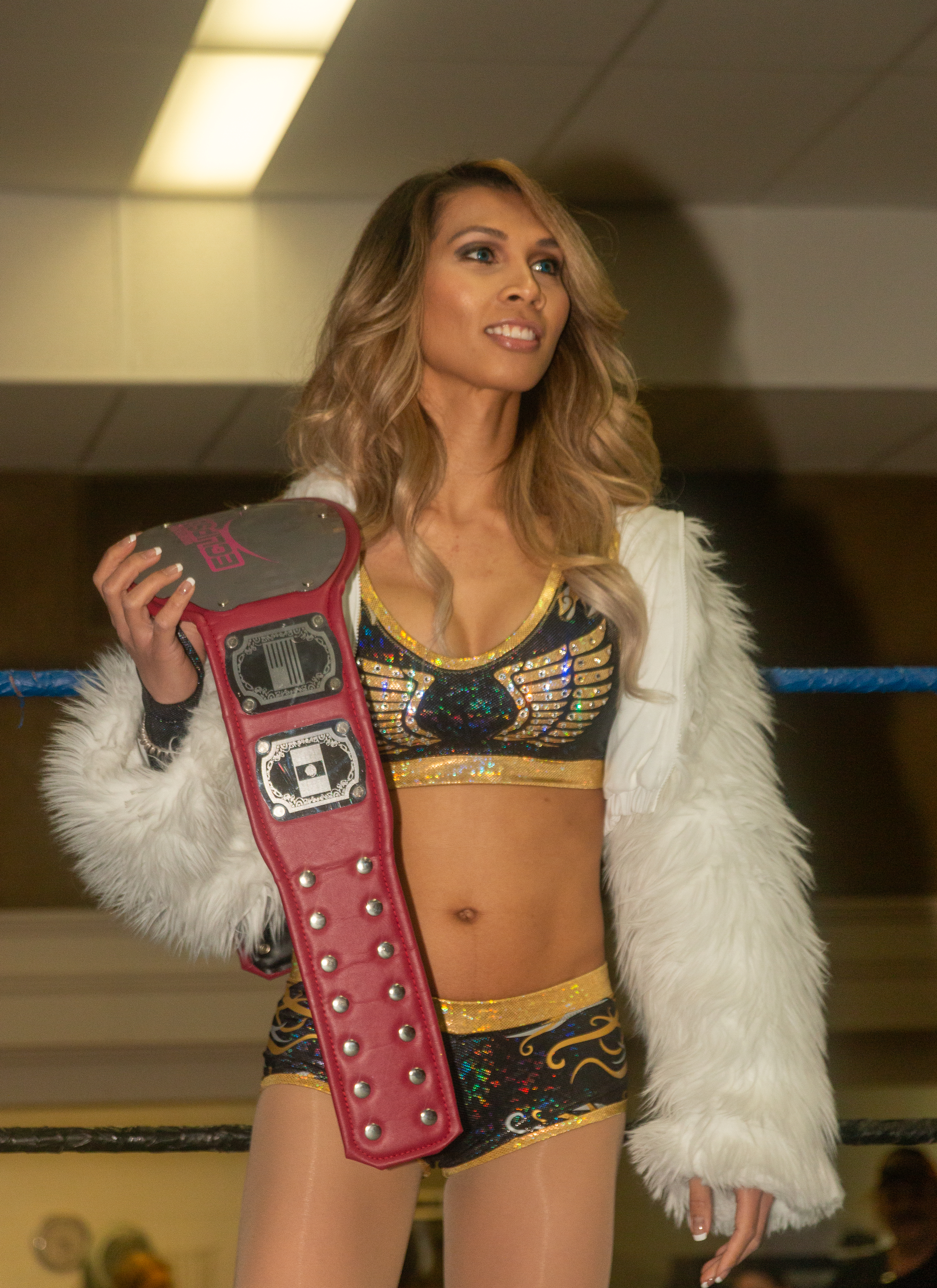
Shaw is a one-time PWE Flame Champion

- Chem Valley Wrestling
  - CVW Women's Championship (1 time)
- Destiny World Wrestling
  - Destiny Women's Championship (1 time, current)
- Fierce Females
  - Fierce Females Scottish Championship (1 time)
  - Fierce Females Scottish Championship Tournament (2020)
- Maple Leaf Pro Wrestling
  - MLP Women's Canadian Championship (1 time, inaugural)
  - MLP Women's Canadian Championship Tournament (2025)
- National Wrestling Alliance
  - NWA World Women's Television Championship (1 time)
- Progress Wrestling
  - Progress World Women's Championship (1 time)
- Pro-Wrestling: EVE
  - Pro-Wrestling: EVE Tag Team Championship (1 time) – with Emersyn Jayne
- Pro Wrestling Illustrated
  - Ranked No. 19 of the top 150 female wrestlers in the PWI Women's 150 in 2021
- Revolution Pro Wrestling
  - Undisputed British Women's Championship (2 times)
- Women's Wrestling Hall of Fame
  - WWHOF Award (1 time)
    - Most Inspirational Wrestler of the Year (2024)
