= MLP Canadian Women's Championship =

Canadian Women's professional wrestling championship

Details
- Promotion: Maple Leaf Pro Wrestling (MLP)
- Date established: May 10, 2025
- Current champion: Priscilla Kelly
- Date won: August 8, 2026 (aired September 16, 2026)

Other names
- MLP Canadian Women's Championship (2025–present); MLP Women's Canadian Championship (2025)
Statistics
- First champion: Gisele Shaw
- Most reigns: Gisele Shaw & Priscilla Kelly (All 1 reign)
- Longest reign: Gisele Shaw (455 days)
- Shortest reign: Priscilla Kelly (58+ days)

The MLP Canadian Women's Championship is a women's professional wrestling championship created and promoted by Independent Canadian professional wrestling company Maple Leaf Pro Wrestling (MLP). The current champion is Priscilla Kelly in her first reign.

== History ==
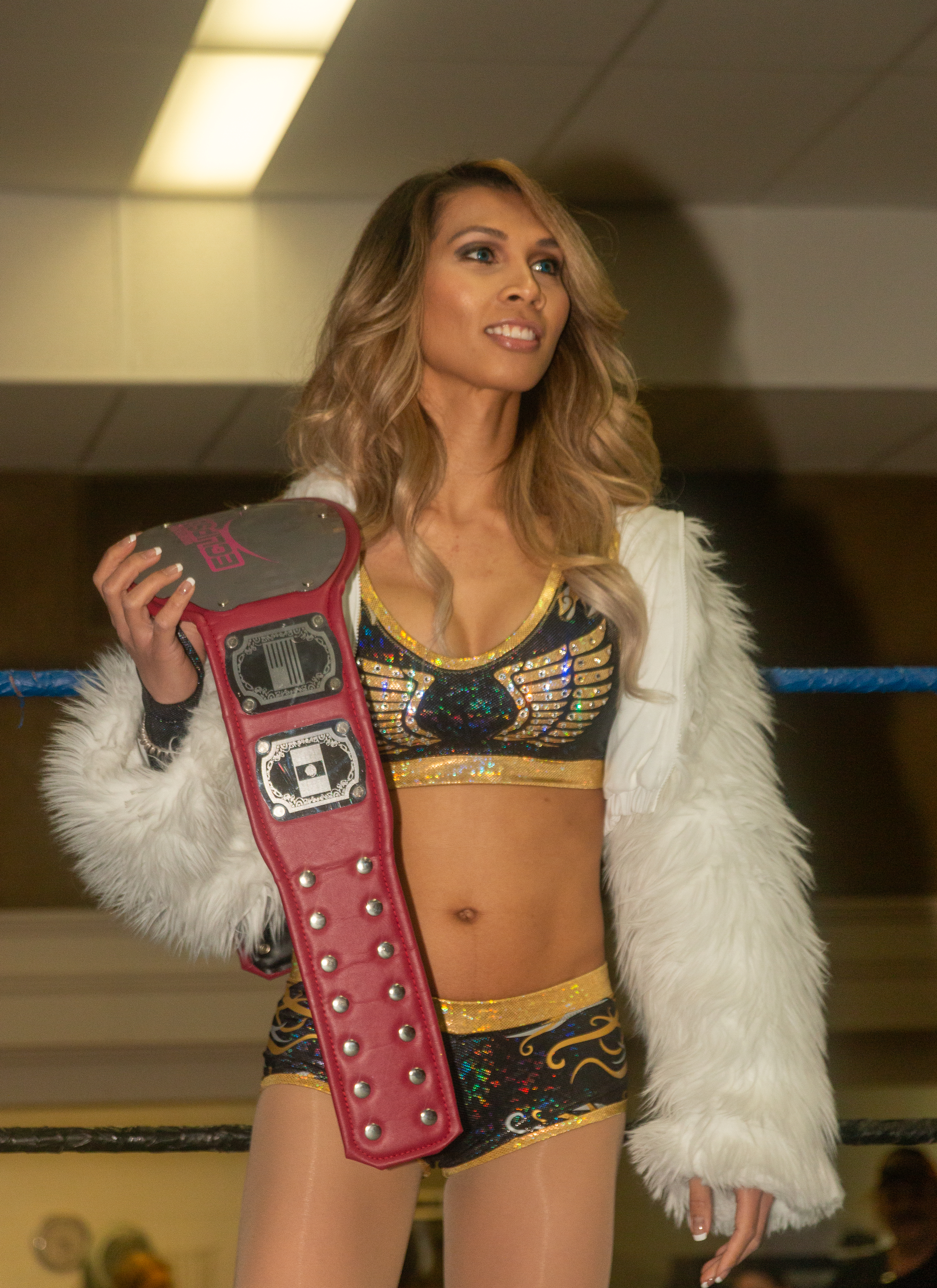
Inaugural champion Gisele Shaw.

On May 10, 2025 Gisele Shaw became the inaugural MLP Women's Canadian Champion by defeating Kylie Rae in the MLP Women's Canadian Championship tournament finals at Northern Rising.

== Inaugural tournament ==
=== Inaugural Women's Canadian Championship tournament bracket ===
Quarterfinals; Mayhem (March 14)
Kylie Rae	Pin
Zoe Sager	7:36
Taylor Rising	Pin
Beaa Moss	5:39
Serena Deeb	Sub
Aurora Teves	7:40
Gisele Shaw	Pin
Laynie Luck	16:33

Semifinals; Mayhem (March 15)
Kylie Rae	Sub
Taylor Rising	11:05
Serena Deeb	Pin
Gisele Shaw	20:33

Final; Northern Rising (May 10)
Kylie Rae	Pin
Gisele Shaw	18:05

== Reigns ==
As of October 5, 2026.

Key
No.	Overall reign number
Reign	Reign number for the specific champion
Days	Number of days held
+	Current reign is changing daily

No.	Champion	Championship change			Reign statistics		Notes	Ref.
No.	Champion	Date	Event	Location	Reign	Days	Notes	Ref.
1	Gisele Shaw	May 10, 2025	Northern Rising	Toronto, Ontario, Canada	1	455	Defeated Kylie Rae in the tournament final to become the inaugural champion.	
2	Priscilla Kelly	August 8, 2026	Mayhem	Windsor, Ontario, Canada	1	58+	Aired on tape delay on September 16, 2026.	

== See also ==
- World Women's Championship (disambiguation)
