= Rise Wrestling events =

Rise Wrestling is an all-female professional wrestling promotion. Since 2016, it has held more than 50 events and internet pay-per-views, as well as taping shows called RISE Ascent, which airs on their Twitch channel.

== RISE 1: Ignite ==
RISE 1: Ignite
- Promotion: Rise Wrestling
- Date: November 10, 2016
- City: Berwyn, Illinois
- Venue: Berwyn Eagles Club

No.	Results	Stipulations
1	Sonya Strong defeated Liiza Hall	Singles match
2	Arianna vs. Eve ended in no contest	Singles match with Dominique Fabiano as the special guest referee
3	Britt Baker and The Skilled Death Artist #1 won by Artist last eliminating Paloma Starr (Note: Order of elimination: Jawsolyn, Kiera Hogan, Gemma Cross, Paige Turner, Skylar Slice, MJ Jenkins, Phoebe, Faye Jackson, Layne Rosario and Paloma Starr)	Phoenix of RISE Championship tournament qualifying battle royal match
4	Angel Dust defeated Aria Blake	Phoenix of RISE Championship tournament qualifying match
5	Team East Coast (Antoinette Marie, C-Bunny and Hellen Vale) defeated Team Brew (Sierra, Stacy Shadows and Sunsette Riviera)	Six-woman tag team match
6	Delilah Doom defeated Samantha Heights	Phoenix of RISE Championship tournament qualifying match
7	Angie Skye defeated Tess Valentine	Singles match
8	Kate Carney defeated Heather Monroe	Phoenix of RISE Championship tournament qualifying match
9	Shayna Baszler (c) (with Mercedes Martinez) defeated Ayzali and Ray Lyn by submission	Three-way match for the AIW Women's Championship
10	Shotzi Blackheart defeated Savannah Evans	Singles match
11	Saraya Knight defeated Kennadi Brink by submission	Singles match
12	Britt Baker defeated Nicole Matthews by referee's decision	Phoenix of RISE Championship tournament qualifying match
13	The Buru Death Squad (Kikyo and Roni Nicole) defeated Team Sea Stars (Ashley Vox and Delmi Exo) (with Jawsolyn)	Tag team match
14	Angel Dust defeated Britt Baker, Delilah Doom and Kate Carney	Tournament final four-way match for the inaugural Phoenix of RISE Championship
(c) / – the champion(s) heading into the match

== RISE 2: Ascent ==
RISE 2: Ascent
- Promotion: Rise Wrestling
- Date: January 27, 2017
- City: South Gate, California
- Venue: American Legion Post #335

No.	Results	Stipulations	Times
1	Desi De Rata defeated Jewells Malone	Singles match	5:20
2	Sage Sin defeated Allie Kat	Singles match	6:14
3	Rosemary defeated Samara	Singles match	7:21
4	Saraya Knight defeated Emily	Singles match	0:29
5	Saraya Knight defeated Layne Rosario	Singles match	1:00
6	Saraya Knight defeated Kikyo	Singles match	3:40
7	Ruby Raze defeated Hawlee Layne	Singles match	6:04
8	Mercedes Martinez defeated Shotzi Blackheart	Singles match	13:27
9	Britt Baker defeated Chelsea Green	Singles match	13:51
10	Angel Dust (c) defeated Delilah Doom	Singles match for the Phoenix of RISE Championship	11:38
(c) / – the champion(s) heading into the match

== GAIN 1: Stand with Knights ==
GAIN 1: Stand with Knights
- Promotion: Rise Wrestling
- Date: March 25, 2017
- City: Berwyn, Illinois
- Venue: Berwyn Eagles Club

No.	Results	Stipulations
1	Jaxon Argos defeated Tyler Matrix	Singles match
2	Thunderkitty defeated Stacy Shadows	Singles match
3	Logan Lynch defeated Aaron Anders, Dr. Daniel C. Rockingham and PB Smooth	Four-way match
4	Jordy Lee and Kody Rice defeated Arik Cannon and Darin Corbin	Tag team match
5	Paradise Lost (Angel Dust and Rosemary) defeated Fire And Nice (Britt Baker and Chelsea Green)	Tag team match
6	Michael Elgin defeated Myron Reed	Singles match
7	Shotzi Blackheart (c) vs. Shayna Baszler ended in a double disqualification	Singles match for the Phoenix of RISE Championship
8	Mercedes Martinez defeated Eddie Kingston	Singles match
(c) / – the champion(s) heading into the match

== RISE 3: Medic ==
RISE 3: Medic
- Promotion: Rise Wrestling
- Date: July 7, 2017
- City: Berwyn, Illinois
- Venue: Berwyn Eagles Club

No.	Results	Stipulations
1^{D}	Sierra defeated Laynie Luck	Singles match
2^{D}	Aja Perera defeated Stefany Sinclair	Singles match
3^{D}	Dementia D'Rose defeated Dynamite DiDi	Singles match
4	Deonna Purrazzo defeated Cheerleader Melissa	Singles match
5	Kikyo defeated Jewells Malone	Singles match
6	Hudson Envy defeated Savannah Evans	Singles match
7	Stacy Shadows defeated Valentina Loca	Singles match
8	Saraya Knight defeated Stacy Shadows	Singles match
9	Rosemary defeated Delilah Doom	Singles match
10	Fire And Nice (Britt Baker and Chelsea Green) defeated The Blue Nation (Charli Evans and Jessica Troy)	Tag team match
11	Shotzi Blackheart (c) defeated Dust	Dog collar match for the Phoenix of RISE Championship
(c) / – the champion(s) heading into the match; D / – this was a dark match

== Bellatrix 26/RISE 4: Warriors Rise ==
Bellatrix 26/RISE 4: Warriors Rise
- Promotion(s): Bellatrix Female Warriors; Rise Wrestling
- Date: September 15, 2017
- City: Norwich, Norfolk
- Venue: Epic Studios

No.	Results	Stipulations
1	Deonna Purrazzo defeated Shax	Singles match
2	Jetta defeated Amarah	Singles match
3	Mercedes Martinez defeated Skarlett	Singles match
4	Violet O'Hara defeated Charli Evans	Singles match
5	Dominita defeated Jewells Malone	Singles match
6	Nikki Knight and Saraya Knight defeated Innocence and Leia Elise	Tag team match
7	Lady Lory defeated Alex Windsor (c) and Queen Maya	Three-way match for the Bellatrix World Championship
8	Shotzi Blackheart (c) defeated Delilah Doom	Dog collar match for the Phoenix of RISE Championship
9	Paradise Lost (Dust and Rosemary) defeated The Angelics (El Daluna and Erin Angel)	Tag team match
(c) / – the champion(s) heading into the match

== RISE 5: Rising Sun ==
RISE 5: Rising Sun
- Promotion: Rise Wrestling
- Date: November 10, 2017
- City: Berwyn, Illinois
- Venue: Berwyn Eagles Club

No.	Results	Stipulations
1^{D}	Paloma Starr, Samara and Trixie Tash defeated Londyn Ali, Robyn and Savanna Stone	Six-woman tag team match
2^{D}	Hyan defeated Indi Hartwell	Singles match
3^{D}	LuFisto defeated Layne Rosario	Singles match
4	Heather Monroe defeated Renee Michelle by submission	Singles match
5	Jewells Malone defeated Hawlee Layne	Singles match
6	Sinister Sweethearts (Brittany Blake and Samantha Heights) defeated ACR and Valentina Loca	Tag team match
7	Allie Kat defeated Tasha Steelz	Singles match
8	Cheerleader Melissa defeated Zoe Lucas	Singles match
9	Saraya Knight defeated Karen Q, Miranda Salinas and Ray Lyn by submission	Four-way match
10	Nicole Savoy defeated Kylie by submission	Singles match
11	Taya Valkyrie defeated Hudson Envy	Singles match
12	Shazza McKenzie defeated Thunder Rosa	Singles match
13	Aja Kong and The Blue Nation (Charli Evans and Jessica Troy) defeated Dynamite DiDi, Hiroyo Matsumoto and Rachael Ellering	Six-woman tag team match
14	Delilah Doom defeated Britt Baker, Deonna Purrazzo, Dust, Kikyo and Shotzi Blackheart (c)	Six-way elimination match for the Phoenix of RISE Championship
(c) / – the champion(s) heading into the match; D / – this was a dark match

Six-way elimination match

Order	Eliminated
1	Britt Baker
2	Deonna Purrazzo
3	Shotzi Blackheart
4	Kikyo
5	Dust
Winner	Delilah Doom

== RISE 6: Brutality ==
RISE 6: Brutality
- Promotion: Rise Wrestling
- Date: December 1, 2017
- City: South Gate, California
- Venue: American Legion Post #335

No.	Results	Stipulations	Times
1	Hyan and Maritza Janett defeated Trixie Tash and Willow Nightingale	Tag team match	10:01
2	Deonna Purrazzo defeated Kylie	Singles match	8:02
3	Priscilla Kelly defeated ACR, Ayoka and Chelsea Green	Four-way match	5:55
4	Cheerleader Melissa defeated Kikiyo by disqualification	Singles match	—
5	LuFisto defeated Dust	Barbed wire bat match	11:40
6	Team Lucha Queen (Andrew Everett, Heather Monroe, Penelope Ford and Taya Valkyrie) defeated Team Zombie Princess (Jimmy Jacobs, Ruby Raze, Sage Sin and Savannah Evans)	Eight-intengender elimination tag team match	22:33
7	Nicole Savoy defeated Aerial Monroe	Singles match	10:10
8	Kris Wolf (with Bull Nakano) defeated Shotzi Blackheart (with Madusa)	Singles match	9:15
9	Toni Storm (c) defeated Mercedes Martinez	Singles match for the World of Stardom Championship	15:23
10	Delilah Doom (c) defeated Rosemary	Steel cage match for the Phoenix of RISE Championship	17:12
(c) / – the champion(s) heading into the match

Eight-intengender elimination tag team match

Order	Eliminated	Team	Eliminated by
1	Sage Sin	Team Zombie Princess	Taya Valkyrie
2	Penelope Ford	Team Lucha Queen	Jimmy Jacobs
3	Heather Monroe	Team Lucha Queen	Ruby Raze
4	Andrew Everett	Team Lucha Queen	Ruby Raze
5	Savannah Evans	Team Zombie Princess	Taya Valkyrie
6	Ruby Raze	Team Zombie Princess	Taya Valkyrie
7	Jimmy Jacobs	Team Zombie Princess	Taya Valkyrie
Winners	Team Lucha Queen	—N/a	

== RISE 6.5: Throttle ==
RISE 6.5: Throttle
- Promotion: Rise Wrestling
- Date: December 2, 2017
- City: South Gate, California
- Venue: American Legion Post #335

No.	Results	Stipulations	Times
1	Dust defeated Willow Nightingale	Singles match	4:51
2	Deonna Purrazzo defeated Laurel Van Ness	Singles match	6:22
3	Mercedes Martinez defeated Kris Wolf	Singles match	6:24
4	Toni Storm (c) defeated Shotzi Blackheart	Singles match for the SWA World Championship	7:23
(c) / – the champion(s) heading into the match

== RISE 7: Sensation ==
RISE 7: Sensation
- Promotion: Rise Wrestling
- Date: April 13, 2018
- City: Chicago, Illinois
- Venue: Berwyn Eagles Club

No.	Results	Stipulations
1^{D}	Jenna Van Muscles defeated Laynie Luck	Singles match
2^{D}	Tesha Price defeated Robyn Reid	Singles match
3	Fly High WDSS (Kay Lee Ray and Mia Yim) defeated Indi Hartwell and Tessa Blanchard	Tag team match
4	Zoe Lucas defeated FaceBrooke, Thunder Rosa and Valentina Loca	Gauntlet match
5	Karen Q and Ray Lyn defeated Aerial Monroe and Nicole Savoy	Tag team match
6	Shazza McKenzie defeated Hyan	Singles match
7	The Blue Nation (Charli Evans and Jessica Troy) defeated Fire And Nice (Britt Baker and Chelsea Green)	Tag team match
8	Mercedes Martinez defeated Taya Valkyrie	Singles match
9	Deuce's Alliance (Cheerleader Melissa, Shotzi Blackheart and Willow Nightingale) (with Madusa) defeated Gokumon-To (Dynamite DiDi, Kikyo and Kris Wolf)	Six-woman elimination tag team match
10	Saraya Knight defeated Joey Ryan	Intergender match
11	Melanie Cruise and Zoey Skye defeated Kylie Rae and Miranda Alize	Tag team match
12	Delilah Doom (c) defeated Deonna Purrazzo	Singles match for the Phoenix of RISE Championship
(c) / – the champion(s) heading into the match; D / – this was a dark match

Six-woman elimination tag team match

Order	Eliminated	Team	Eliminated by
1	Cheerleader Melissa	Deuce's Alliance	Dynamite DiDi
2	Dynamite DiDi	Gokumon-To	Willow Nightingale
3	Willow Nightingale	Deuce's Alliance	Kikyo
4	Kris Wolf	Gokumon-To	—N/a
5	Kikyo	Gokumon-To	Shotzi Blackheart
Winners	Deuce's Alliance	—N/a	

== RISE 7.5: Steel ==
RISE 7.5: Steel
- Promotion: Rise Wrestling
- Date: May 12, 2018
- City: White Oak, Pennsylvania
- Venue: White Oak Athletic Association
- Attendance: ~130

No.	Results	Stipulations	Times
1	Deonna Purrazzo defeated Xia Brookside by submission	Singles match	10:05
2	Tessa Blanchard defeated Shotzi Blackheart	Singles match	10:50
3	Nicole Savoy defeated Delilah Doom by submission	Singles match	12:14
4	Paradise Lost (Dust and Raven's Ash) (with Rosemary) defeated Bones of Contention (Karen Q and Ray Lyn)	Tag team match	7:53
5	Britt Baker (c) defeated Mercedes Martinez by submission	Singles match for the IWC Women's Championship	11:22
(c) / – the champion(s) heading into the match

== RISE 8: Outback ==
RISE 8: Outback
- Promotion: Rise Wrestling
- Date: June 29, 2018
- City: South Gate, California
- Venue: American Legion Post #335

No.	Results	Stipulations	Times
1	Blue Nation (Charli Evans and Jessica Troy) defeated The Killer Baes (Heather Monroe and Laura James)	Tag team match	9:36
2	Mia Yim defeated Andrew Everett	Intergender match	12:29
3	Britt Baker defeated Bones of Contention (Karen Q and Ray Lyn)	Handicap match	5:42
4	Mercedes Martinez defeated Kimber Lee, Kris Wolf and Shazza McKenzie	Four-way elimination match	12:31
5	Paradise Lost (Dust and Raven's Ash) defeated Fight For Evers (Rachael Ellering and Taya Valkyrie)	Tag team match	11:40
6	Kylie Rae and Miranda Alize defeated Ayoka Muhara and Nicole Matthews	Tag team match	11:49
7	Delilah Doom (c) vs. Shotzi Blackheart ended in a no contest	Singles match for the Phoenix of RISE Championship	20:17
(c) / – the champion(s) heading into the match

Four-way elimination match

Order	Wrestler	Eliminated by	Time
1	Kimber Lee	Shazza McKenzie	6:17
2	Shazza McKenzie	Mercedes Martinez	8:25
3	Kris Wolf	Mercedes Martinez	12:31
Winner	Mercedes Martinez		12:31

== RISE 9: RISE of The Knockouts ==
RISE 9: RISE of The Knockouts
- Promotion(s): Rise Wrestling; Impact Wrestling
- Date: July 7, 2018
- City: Naperville, Illinois
- Venue: Illinois Basketball Academy

No.	Results	Stipulations	Times
1^{D}	Deonna Purrazzo defeated Allie	Singles match	—
2	Tessa Blanchard defeated Kris Wolf	Singles match	—
3	The Twisted Sisters (Holidead and Thunder Rosa) defeated Karen and Ray Lyn	Tag team match	—
4	Madison Rayne defeated Kikyo	Singles match	—
5	Kimber Lee defeated Shazza McKenzie	Singles match	—
6	Su Yung (c) defeated Saraya Knight	Falls Count Anywhere match for the Impact Knockouts Championship	—
7	Paradise Lost (Dust and Raven's Ash) (with Rosemary) defeated The Blue Nation (Charli Evans and Jessica Troy), Fire and Nice (Britt Baker and Chelsea Green) and Kylie Rae and Miranda Alize	Four-way tag team elimination match for the inaugural Guardians of RISE Championship	—
8	Tessa Blanchard defeated Mercedes Martinez	30-minute Iron Man match for the vacant Phoenix of RISE Championship	30:00
(c) / – the champion(s) heading into the match; D / – this was a dark match

== RISE 10: Insanity ==
RISE 10: Insanity
- Promotion: Rise Wrestling
- Date: October 19, 2018
- City: Berwyn, Illinois
- Venue: Berwyn Eagles Club

No.	Results	Stipulations	Times
1	Karen Q defeated Kimber Lee by submission	Singles match	—
2	The Killer Death Machines (Jessicka Havok and Nevaeh), Allysin Kay and Dynamite DiDi defeated Alex Gracia, Layne Rosario, Myka Madrid and Nicki Victory	Eight-woman elimination tag team match	—
3	Jinny defeated Madison Rayne	Singles match	—
4	Cheerleader Melissa and Rain defeated Dementia D'Rose	Three-way match	—
5	The Bones of Contention (Karen Q and Ray Lyn) defeated Colt Cabana and RJ City (with David Arquette)	Intergender tag team match	—
6	Paradise Lost (Dust and Raven's Ash) (c) (with Rosemary) defeated Balls Of Doom (Delilah Doom and Shotzi Blackheart)	Tag team match for the Guardians of RISE Championship	—
7	Mercedes Martinez defeated Tessa Blanchard (c)	75-minute Iron Man match for the Phoenix of RISE Championship	75:00
(c) / – the champion(s) heading into the match

== RISE 12: ROW on the Rise ==
RISE 12: ROW on the RISE
- Promotion(s): Rise Wrestling; Reality of Wrestling
- Date: January 19, 2019
- City: Texas City, Texas
- Venue: World Gym Arena

No.	Results	Stipulations
1	Phoebe defeated The Insidious One	Singles match
2	Rok-C defeated Lynnette Laso	Singles match
3	Big Mamma defeated Killa Kate	Singles match
4	Rachael Ellering defeated Delilah Doom (with Rosemary) and Shotzi Blackheart	Three-way match
5	Hyan (c) defeated Miranda Alize	Singles match for the ROW Diamonds Division Championship
6	AQA, Hawlee Cromwell, Jenna Lynn and Saraya Knight defeated Ali Bama, Raychell Rose and The Killer Baes (Heather Monroe and Laura James)	SUrvivor Series eight-woman tag team match
7	Big Mamma defeated Rok-C	Singles match for the ROW Diamonds Division Championship
8	Paradise Lost (Dust and Raven's Ash) (c) (with Rosemary) vs. The Killer Death Machines (Jessicka Havok and Nevaeh) ended in a double countout	Tag team match for the Guardians of RISE Championship
9	Mercedes Martinez (c) defeated Kylie Rae	Singles match for Phoenix of RISE Championship
(c) / – the champion(s) heading into the match

== RISE Early to Rise ==
RISE Early to Rise
- Promotion: Rise Wrestling
- Date: March 29, 2019
- City: Berwyn, Illinois
- Venue: Berwyn Eagles Club

No.	Results	Stipulations
1	Phoebe defeated Viva Von Star	Singles match
2	Ray Lyn defeated Janai Kai	Singles match
3	Allysin Kay defeated AQA	Singles match
4	Mercedes Martinez defeated Jenna Lynn	Singles match
5	Priscilla Kelly defeated Martina	Singles match

== RISE 13: Legendary ==
RISE 13: Legendary
- Promotion: Rise Wrestling
- Date: March 29, 2019
- City: Berwyn, Illinois
- Venue: Berwyn Eagles Club

No.	Results	Stipulations
1	Martina defeated Regina Badger and Thunderkitty	Three-way match
2	The Blue Nation (Charli Evans and Jessica Troy) (with Zoe Lucas) defeated Team Sea Stars (Ashley Vox and Delmi Exo)	Tag team match to determine the #1 contenders for the Guardians of RISE Championship
3	Delilah Doom (with Rosemary) defeated Shotzi Blackheart by disqualification	Singles match
4	Meat Friends (Kris Wolf, Rocky Radley, Rok-C and Samantha Heights) defeated The Legion of Undead Brides (Elayna Black, Hawlee Cromwell, Kimber Lee and Su Yung)	Eight-woman tag team match
5	Zoe Lucas won by last eliminating Aerial Monroe (Note: Order of elimination: Miranda Alize, Sophie King, Ray Lyn, Priscilla Kelly, Sloan, Allie Kat, Harlow O'Hara, Charlie Morgan, Martina, Sonya Strong, Lexie Fyfe, Hyan, AQA, Laynie Luck, Janai Kai, Jenna Lynn, Penelope Ford, Alex Gracia, Jenna Van Muscles, Big Mama, Skilled Death Artist #7, Valentina Loca, Cheerleader Melissa, Bra'Nae, Phoebe, Indi Hartwell, Shazza McKenzie and FaceBrooke)	30-woman RISE of the Contenders match where the winner will receive a shot at the Phoenix of RISE at a time of their choosing
6	The Killer Death Machines (Jessicka Havok and Nevaeh) defeated Paradise Lost (Dust and Raven's Ash) (with Rosemary) (c)	Tag team match for the Guardians of RISE Championship
7	Alisha Edwards defeated Bel Pierce	Singles match
8	Kylie Rae defeated Mercedes Martinez (c) by submission	No ropes submission match for the Phoenix of RISE Championship
9	Zoe Lucas (with Charli Evans, Jessica Troy and Steph De Lander) defeated Kylie Rae (c)	No ropes match for the Phoenix of RISE Championship
(c) / – the champion(s) heading into the match

== RISE 14: Luminous ==
RISE 14: Luminous
- Promotion: Rise Wrestling
- Date: May 17, 2019
- City: South Gate, California
- Venue: American Legion Post #335

No.	Results	Stipulations	Times
1^{D}	Viva Van defeated Auntie Hydie	Singles match	—
2	Dust (with Delilah Doom) defeated Vipress	Singles match	5:08
3	Shotzi Blackheart defeated Miranda Alize by submission	Singles match	9:25
4	Big Mama defeated Ruby Raze	Singles match	6:26
5	Team Sea Stars (Ashley Vox and Delmi Exo), Cheerleader Melissa and Nicole Savoy defeated The Shades of Blonde (Heather Monroe, Laura James, Simone Sherie and Taya Valkyrie) by submission	Eight-woman elimination tag team match	14:25
6	Madison Rayne defeated Mercedes Martinez	Singles match	9:18
7	Zoe Lucas (c) defeated Aerial Monroe	Singles match for the Phoenix of RISE Championship	11:31
8	Rosemary defeated Cherry Bomb	Steel cage match	14:45
(c) / – the champion(s) heading into the match; D / – this was a dark match

Eight-woman elimination tag team match

Order	Eliminated	Eliminated by	Time
1	Simone Sherie	Nicole Savoy	4:46
2	Nicole Savoy	Taya Valkyrie	6:25
3	Cheerleader Melissa and Taya Valkyrie	Eliminated by a double countout	8:00
4	Heather Monroe and Laura James	Ashley Vox and Delmi Exo	14:25
Winners	Ashley Vox and Delmi Exo	—N/a	14:25

== RISE Pride and Joy ==
RISE Pride and Joy
- Promotion: Rise Wrestling
- Date: June 30, 2019
- City: Chicago, Illinois
- Venue: Logan Square Auditorium

No.	Results	Stipulations
1	DJ Summers defeated Regina Badger	Intergender match
2	Ray Lyn defeated Sophie King	Singles match
3	Miranda Alize defeated Candy Lee	Singles match
4	Kimber Lee defeated AQA	Singles match
5	The Killer Death Machines (Jessicka Havok and Nevaeh) (c) defeated Almost Paradise (Courtney Rush and Zoey Skye) and Team Sea Stars (Ashley Vox and Delmi Exo)	Three-way tag team match for the Guardians of RISE Championship
6	Dementia D'Rose vs. Joey Ryan ended in a draw	Intergender match
7	Jake Atlas defeated Big Mama, Devon Monroe, Elayna Black, Jamie Senegal and Priscilla Kelly	Intergender six-way elimination match
8	Shotzi Blackheart (c) defeated Effy by disqualification	Intergender match for the Sabotage War of The Genders Championship
9	Cassandro el Exotico defeated Mercedes Martinez	Intergender match
(c) / – the champion(s) heading into the match

Intergender six-way elimination match

Order	Eliminated	Eliminated by
1	Elayna Black	Big Mama
2	Big Mama	Jake Atlas, Jamie Senegal and Priscilla Kelly
3	Devon Monroe	Priscilla Kelly
4	Jamie Senegal	Jake Atlas
5	Priscilla Kelly	Jake Atlas
Winner	Jake Atlas	—N/a

== RISE Regional Rising Stars Tournament - The Midwest Bracket ==
RISE Regional Rising Stars Tournament - The Midwest Bracket
- Promotion: Rise Wrestling
- Date: September 1, 2019
- City: Berwyn, Illinois
- Venue: Berwyn Eagles Club

No.	Results	Stipulations
1^{D}	Storm Grayson defeated Ernesto Aguilar	Singles match
2	Laynie Luck defeated Hawlee Cromwell	Regional Rising Stars Tournament Midwest Bracket quarter-final match
3	Sierra defeated Queen Aminata by submission	Regional Rising Stars Tournament Midwest Bracket quarter-final match
4	Max the Impaler defeated Valentina Loca	Regional Rising Stars Tournament Midwest Bracket quarter-final match
5	Sophie King defeated Elayna Black	Regional Rising Stars Tournament Midwest Bracket quarter-final match
6	Effy defeated Devon Monroe by submission	Singles match
7	Jake Atlas defeated Priscilla Kelly	Intergender match
8	Laynie Luck defeated Sierra	Regional Rising Stars Tournament Midwest Bracket semi-final match
9	Max the Impaler defeated Sophie King	Regional Rising Stars Tournament Midwest Bracket semi-final match
10	The Killer Death Machines (Jessicka Havok and Nevaeh) (c) defeated Paradise Lost (Dust, Raven's Ash and Rosemary)	"Anything goes" handicap match for the Guardians of RISE Championship
11	Big Swole (c) defeated Double D Rose	Singles match for the Phoenix of RISE Championship
12	Laynie Luck defeated Max the Impaler	Regional Rising Stars Tournament Midwest Bracket final match
(c) / – the champion(s) heading into the match; D / – this was a dark match

== RISE Early to Rise 2 ==
RISE Early to Rise 2
- Promotion: Rise Wrestling
- Date: November 1, 2019
- City: Berwyn, Illinois
- Venue: Berwyn Eagles Club

No.	Results	Stipulations
1	Sophie King defeated Blair Onyx, Davey Bang and Lady Frost	Four-way match
2	Jody Threat defeated Jay Raves	Singles match
3	Janai Kai defeated Jenna Lynn	Singles match
4	Miranda Alize defeated Kimber Lee	Singles match
5	Mercedes Martinez defeated Jamie Senegal	Intergender match
6	Jake Atlas defeated Tessa Blanchard	Intergender match

== RISE La Escalera ==
RISE La Escalera
- Promotion: Rise Wrestling
- Date: November 1, 2019
- City: Berwyn, Illinois
- Venue: Berwyn Eagles Club

No.	Results	Stipulations
1^{D}	Zan Phoenix defeated Bel Pierce	Singles match
2	Witch Please (Elayna Black and Hawlee Cromwell) defeated Paradise Lost (Ash and Dust) (with Rosemary)	Tag team match
3	Lindsay Snow defeated Thunderkitty	Singles match
4	The Latina Superstars (Mercedes Martinez and Miranda Alize) defeated Team Sea Stars (Ashley Vox and Delmi Exo)	Tag team match
5	Candy Lee defeated Jamie Senegal	Intergender match
6	Taya Valkyrie defeated Allysin Kay	"Savage AF' match
7	The Killer Death Machines (Jessicka Havok and Nevaeh) (c) defeated The Blue Nation (Charli Evans and Jessica Troy)	Tag team match for the Guardians of RISE Championship
8	Cassandro El Exotico defeated Saraya Knight	Intergender match with Colt Cabana as the special guest referee
9	Kylie Rae defeated Hyan, Jake Atlas, Jesus Bryce, Priscilla Kelly and Ruby Raze	Intergender La Escalera ladder match to determine the #1 contender for the Phoenix of RISE Championship
10	Big Swole (c) defeated Laynie Luck	Singles match for the Phoenix of RISE Championship
11	Shotzi Blackheart defeated Rosemary	No holds barred match
(c) / – the champion(s) heading into the match; D / – this was a dark match
