= Hyan (wrestler) =

American professional wrestler (born 1992)

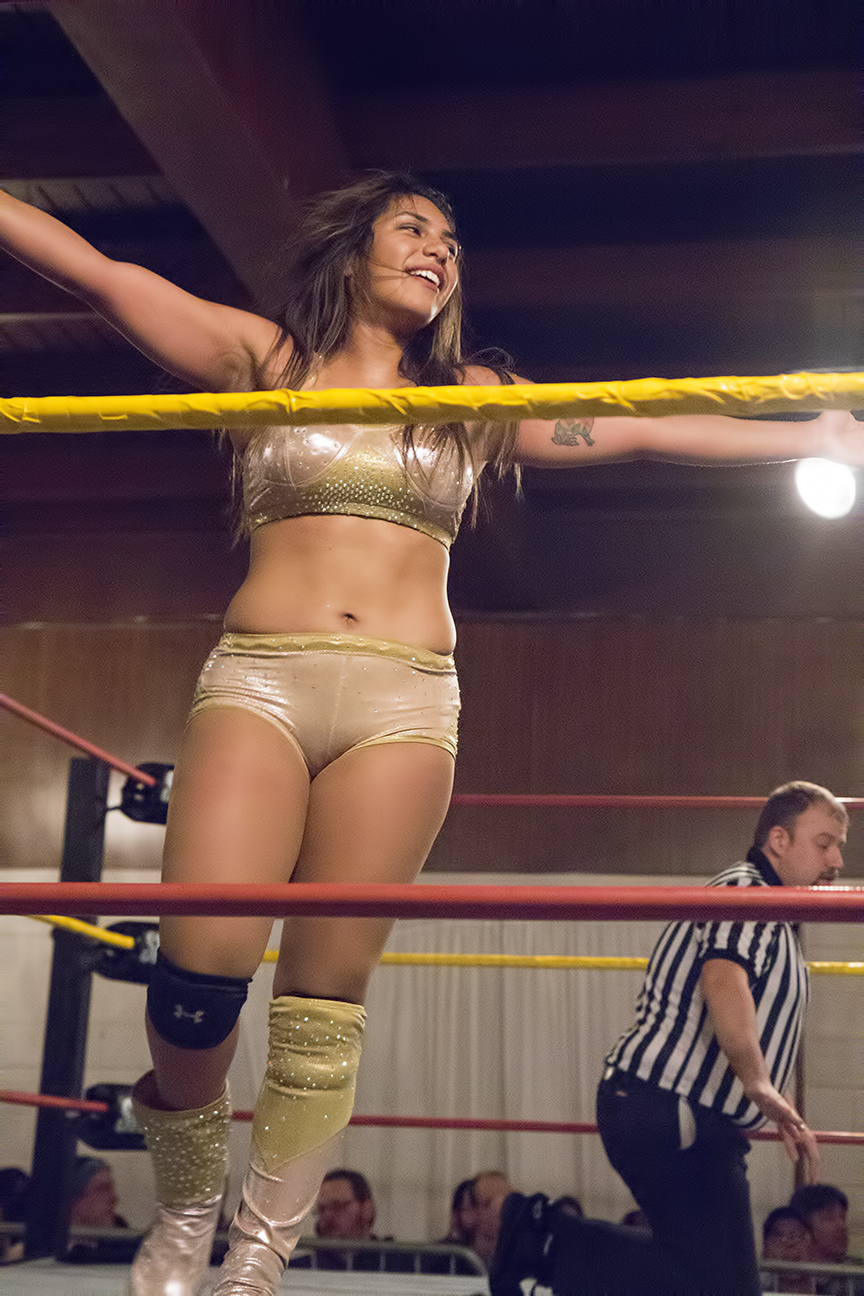
- Hyan in 2017

Personal information
- Born: September 19, 1993 (age 33) Houston, Texas, U.S.

Professional wrestling career
- Ring name(s): Hyaneyoung Young; Hyaneyoung Olvera; Hyaneyoung; Hyan
- Trained by: Reality of Wrestling; Gino Medina; JJ Blake
- Debut: 2014

Hyaneyoung Gerard (née Olvera; born September 19, 1993), better known by her ring name Hyan, is an American professional wrestler. She is signed to All Elite Wrestling (AEW), and also appears in AEW's sister promotion, Ring of Honor (ROH). Prior to AEW, Hyan was known for her tenure on the independent pro wrestling scene, most notably with Reality of Wrestling and Shimmer Women Athletes.

== Professional wrestling career ==
=== Reality of Wrestling (2014–2022) ===
Gerard made her professional wrestling debut in Reality of Wrestling at ROW Summer Of Champions on July 26, 2017 under her real first name of "Hyaneyoung", where she competed in a battle royal for the vacant ROW Diamonds Championship from which she came unsuccessfully. During her time in the promotion, she successfully won the Diamonds title on three separate occasions. Between 2014 and 2022, she competed as a developmental talent of ROW.

She made several appearances in Impact Wrestling. At Impact Wrestling/ROW Deep Impact, a cross-over event from July 6, 2019, she competed in a four-way match won by Tessa Blanchard and also involving A. Q. A. and Su Yung. At Impact Wrestling #948, Hyan fell short to Mickie James in a bout dubbed as one of the latter's "Last Rodeo" matches which were going under the stipulation of loser retires.

=== American independent circuit (2014–present) ===
Gerard is known for her tenures with various promotions from the American independent scene with which he has shared brief or longer stints such as Shimmer Women Athletes, Rise Wrestling, AAW Wrestling, Deadlock Pro-Wrestling, New Texas Pro Wrestling and many others. She made a one-night appearance at WWE's Monday Night RAW on August 29, 2016, where she fell short to Nia Jax.

At Fighting Spirit Unleashed, an event promoted by NJPW Strong on October 28, 2023, Gerard unsuccessfully challenged Giulia for the Strong Women's Championship.

=== Shimmer Women Athletes (2017–2021) ===
Gerard shared a four-year tenure with Shimmer Women Athletes. She made her debut at Volume 98 on November 12, 2017, where she teamed up with Jewells Malone to defeat Cherry Layne and Trixie Tash. During her time in the promotion, she chased for several of the titles promoted by it. As for the Heart of Shimmer Championship, she first became an interim champion for an injured Samantha Heights at Volume 116 on November 3, 2019, where she defeated Kris Statlander and Rhia O'Reilly in a three-way elimination match. Gerard then defeated Thunderkitty at The Collective on October 10, 2021 to become lineal champion. She dropped the title to Nevaeh at Volume 119 on October 31, 2021, one day prior to the closure of the promotion.

=== Japanese promotions (2019) ===
Due to competing as a developmental talent for Shimmer, Gerard made an overseas excursion to the Japanese independent circuit between May and June 2019. She started with Marvelous That's Women Pro Wrestling in which she made her first appearance at a house show from May 12, 2019, where she teamed up with Dash Chisako to defeat Hiroe Nagahama and Mei Hoshizuki. At WAVE Sendai WAVE Keep Smile 10, an event promoted by Pro Wrestling Wave on May 19, 2019, she fell short to Yumi Ohka in singles competition. Gerard ended her excursion in Japan by competing for Sendai Girls' Pro Wrestling. At Sendai Girls Joshi Puroresu Big Show 2019 In Niigata, she teamed up with Hikaru Shida and Mei Suruga to defeat Alex Lee, Heidi Katrina and Kaoru.

=== European independent circuit (2021–2023) ===
Gerard competed in several promotions from the European independent scene. At RevPro Live In Southampton 16, an event promoted by Revolution Pro Wrestling on February 13, 2022, she unsuccessfully challenged champion Alex Windsor and Rhia O'Reilly in a three-way match for the Undisputed British Women's Championship. She briefly competed in Pro-Wrestling: EVE, having her most notable match taking place at EVE Women Behaving Badly on March 4, 2022, where she fell short to Charlie Morgan in a qualifier for the SHE-1 tournament. She participated in the 2023 edition of Westside Xtreme Wrestling's wXw Femmes Fatales tournament where she defeated Rina Yamashita in the first rounds and fell short to Nicole Matthews in the finals. One month later at wXw We Love Wrestling #51 on October 21, 2023, she unsuccessfully challenged Ava Everett for the wXw Women's Championship.

=== All Elite Wrestling / Ring of Honor (2021–present) ===
From 2021 to 2025, Hyan appeared sporadically for All Elite Wrestling (AEW) and its sister promotion Ring of Honor (ROH), predominately on Dark, Dark: Elevation, and Ring of Honor Wrestling. At AEW Dark: Elevation #64 on May 23, 2022, she unsuccessfully challenged Mercedes Martinez for the ROH Women's World Championship.

On the November 8, 2025 episode of Collision, Hyan teamed with Maya World in a losing effort against TayJay (Anna Jay and Tay Melo). It was later reported that Hyan and World replaced Nixon Newell and Miranda Alize after the latters declined to face TayJay due to booking concerns and left the venue. The duo's performance was praised by AEW talent and management for their professionalism and willingness to step in on short notice. After a few more AEW appearances, Hyan and World officially signed contracts with AEW on December 27, 2025.

On April 12, 2026 on the Zero Hour pre-show of Dynasty, Hyan and World unsuccessfully challenged Divine Dominion (Lena Kross and Megan Bayne) for the AEW Women's World Tag Team Championship. On October 17 at WrestleDream, Hyan failed to win the AEW TBS Championship from Persephone in a four-way match, involving Dani Luna and Queen Aminata.

== Personal life ==
Gerard started watching professional wrestling at age seven and started attending various shows ever since. She cited Trish Stratus, Eddie Guerrero and Rey Mysterio as her biggest inspirations due to growing up as a fan of Lucha style wrestling. After attending one show, she approached Booker T and asked him about how she could become a wrestler. She signed up to Booker's promotion Reality of Wrestling several months later.

== Championships and accomplishments ==
- DDT Pro-Wrestling
  - Ironman Heavymetalweight Championship (1 time)
- Shimmer Women Athletes
  - Heart of Shimmer Championship (1 time)
- Pro Wrestling Illustrated
  - Ranked No. 33 of the top 150 female singles wrestlers in the PWI Women's 150 in 2022
  - Ranked No. 411 of the top 500 singles wrestlers in the PWI 500 in 2024
