= Killer Death Machines =

Professional wrestling tag team

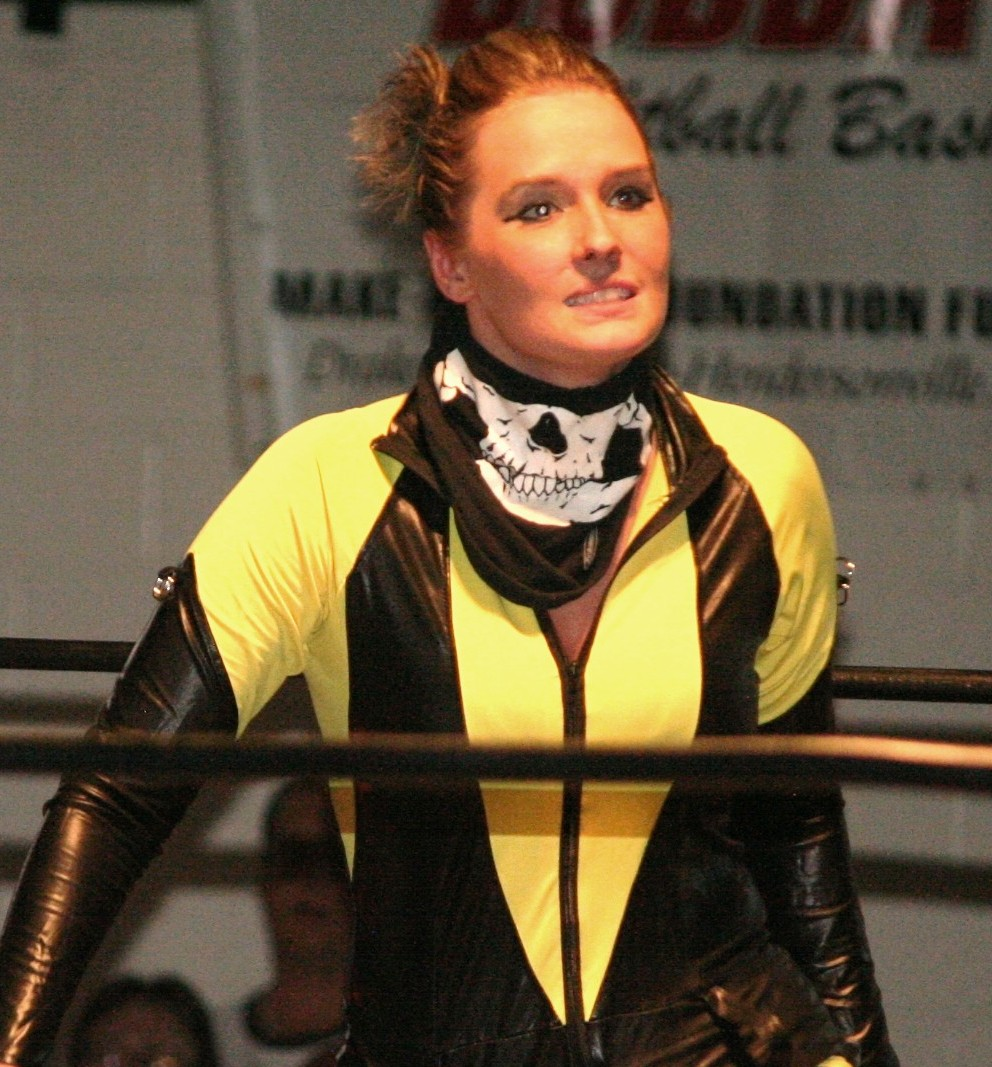
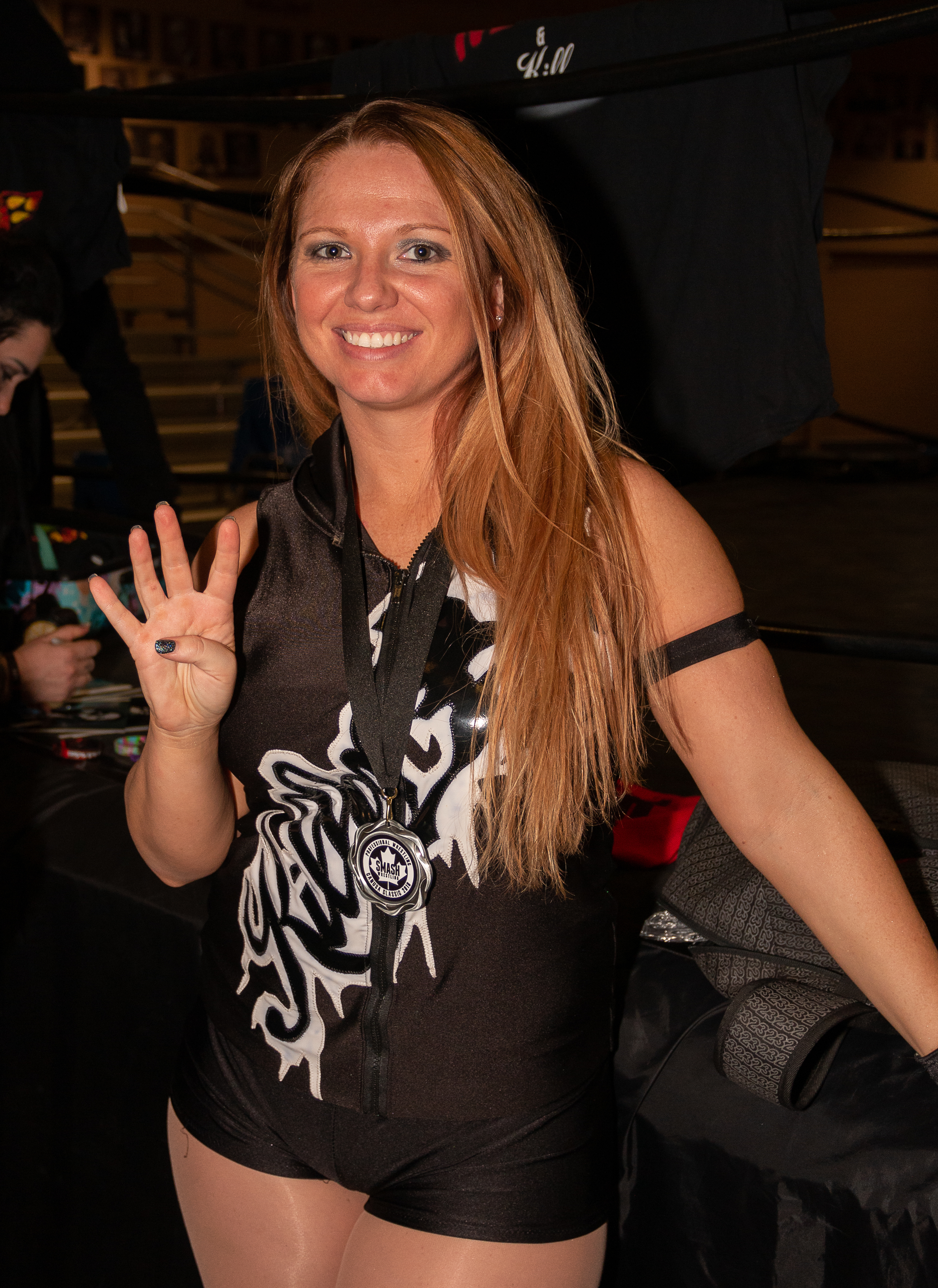

Tag team
- Members: Jessicka Havok / Havok; Nevaeh / Hazard
- Name(s): Killer Death Machines; Monsters of Madness; Havok and Nevaeh
- Billed heights: Havok: 6 ft 0 in (1.83 m); Nevaeh: 5 ft 4 in (1.63 m)
- Debut: April 11, 2014
- Disbanded: March 30, 2021
- Years active: 2014–2021

Killer Death Machines was a professional wrestling tag team consisting of Jessicka Havok and Nevaeh. They were best known for their time in Impact Wrestling. They also competed as a team in the independent circuit most notably for Shimmer Women Athletes and Rise Wrestling, where they are the reigning and longest reigning Guardians of RISE Champions in their first reign. The team would also compete for Women of Wrestling's sixth season as Monsters of Madness in 2019.

The team would also compete in Impact Wrestling from 2020 to 2021 until the team disbanded after repetitive losses as Nevaeh turned on Havok. This would lead to Havok defeating Nevaeh and Nevaeh leaving Impact shortly after.

== History ==
=== Independent circuit (2014–2020) ===
Jessicka Havok and Nevaeh both represented Shimmer Women Athletes and formed their tag team "Killer Death Machines" at an AAW Wrestling event Point of No Return on April 11, 2014, where they competed against Athena and Heidi Lovelace in a losing effort. Killer Death Machines wrestled two more matches in 2014, once at Combat Zone Wrestling's Prelude to Violence where they defeated Kimber Lee and LuFisto and at Queens of Combat (QOC) event QOC 2 event where they defeated Sassy Stephie and Taeler Hendrix. The team would then go their separate ways as Havok joined Total Nonstop Action Wrestling (TNA) and wrestled there exclusively while Nevaeh continued to compete on the independent circuit.

After competing separately for three years, the Killer Death Machines reunited at the WrestleCon Women's SuperShow on April 1, 2017, where they competed against Leva Bates and Mia Yim, Eddy McQueen and Jamie Senegal and Sexy Young Caramels (Devyn Nicole & Savannah Evans) in a four-way match, which Bates and Yim won. The team would then regularly compete as a tag team for various independent circuit between 2017 and 2019. On May 19, 2018, Killer Death Machines returned to QOC at Royalty Returns, where they lost to Ruthless Ambition (Maria Manic and Penelope Ford). They made an appearance for The Wrestling Revolver at the event The Catalina Wrestling Mixer Vol. 2, where they participated in the One Night Tag Team Tournament. They competed against the eventual winners The Rascalz (Dezmond Xavier and Zachary Wentz) in the opening round for the latter's PWR Tag Team Championship in a losing effort.

Killer Death Machines made several appearances for Rockstar Pro Wrestling in 2018 and 2019, wrestling against women in tag team matches as well as against men in intergender tag team matches. They would also compete for Bar Wrestling's event Brian Cage's Bachelor Party on July 10, 2019, where they lost to The Bomb Baes (Heather Monroe and Jake Atlas).

==== Shimmer Women Athletes (2017–2019) ====
Killer Death Machines reunited in SHIMMER at Volume 93 on July 8, 2017, where they unsuccessfully challenged Mount Tessa (Tessa Blanchard and Vanessa Kraven) for the Shimmer Tag Team Championship. At Volume 102, Killer Death Machines competed against Gokumon-To (Dynamite DiDi and Kikyo). Killer Death Machines rebounded with a win against The Blue Nation (Charli Evans and Jessica Troy) at Volume 104. However, at Volume 106, Killer Death Machines lost a rematch to Blue Nation to determine the #1 contenders for the Tag Team Championship. At Volume 107, Killer Death Machines competed against The Totally Tubular Tag Team (Delilah Doom and Leva Bates), Blue Nation and the team of Cheerleader Melissa and Mercedes Martinez in a four-way elimination match for the Tag Team Championship, which Melissa and Martinez won. In their last appearance for Shimmer, Killer Death Machines defeated Indi Hartwell and Steph De Lander at Volume 111.

==== Rise Wrestling (2018–2019) ====
Killer Death Machines made their televised debut in Rise Wrestling on the June 27, 2018 episode of Ascent against Delilah Doom and Shotzi Blackheart in a losing effort. Killer Death Machines achieved their first win in Rise at RISE 10: Insanity where they teamed with Allysin Kay and Dynamite DiDi against Alex Gracia, Layne Rosario, Myka and Nikki Victory in an eight-woman tag team match.

At RISE 12: ROW on the RISE, Killer Death Machines received a Guardians of RISE Championship title shot against Paradise Lost (Dust and Raven's Ash) but the match ended in a double count-out. Killer Death Machines received a rematch against Paradise Lost for the titles in a Rosemary's Rules match at RISE 13: Legendary. Killer Death Machines defeated Paradise Lost to capture the Guardians of RISE Championship. They made their first successful title defense against Almost Paradise (Courtney Rush and Zoey Skye) and Team Sea Stars (Ashley Vox and Delmi Exo) in a three-way match at Pride and Joy. At Regional Rising Stars Tournament - The Midwest Bracket, Killer Death Machines successfully defended the titles against Paradise Lost (Dust, Raven's Ash and Rosemary) in a handicap match. Their final title defense occurred against Blue Nation at La Escalera.

=== Women of Wrestling (2019) ===
In 2019, Killer Death Machines worked some tapings for Women of Wrestling's sixth season which would air in the fourth quarter of the year on AXS TV. They were repackaged as Monsters of Madness and Nevaeh was renamed Hazard. Havok had competed for WOW in the fifth season and returned to compete for the sixth season. On the September 7 episode of WOW, Havok competed against The Beast and Jungle Grrrl in a three-way match to determine the #1 contender for the WOW World Championship. The match ended in a no contest after Hazard made her WOW debut and attacked both opponents, setting up a match between the Monsters of Madness and the team of Beast and Jungle Grrrl on the September 28 episode of WOW. Monsters of Madness lost the match via disqualification after Hazard attacked both opponents with a steel chair.

Monsters of Madness would enter a tournament for the vacant WOW Tag Team Championship. They defeated The Dixie Darlings (Jolene Dixie and Jolynn Dixie) in the first round, Chantilly Chella and Sassy Massy in the second round and Holidead and Siren the Voodoo Doll and Holidead and Siren the Voodoo Doll and Adrenaline and Fire in a three-way match in the semifinal to advance to the final round in the season finale, where they lost to Adrenaline and Fire.

=== Impact Wrestling (2020–2021) ===
On April 28, 2020, during the second night of Rebellion, Nevaeh made her Impact Wrestling debut as she watched from distance a Full Metal Mayhem match between Havok and Rosemary, which was won by Rosemary. On the May 26 episode of Impact!, Nevaeh interfered a match between Havok and Kimber Lee, as Nevaeh stopped Lee from hitting Havok with a brass knuckles. Havok and Nevaeh continued to attack Lee afterwards, reuniting their team in Impact Wrestling. They began feuding with Fire N Flava (Kiera Hogan and Tasha Steelz) leading to a no disqualification match between the two teams on the August 11 episode of Impact!, which Havok and Nevaeh lost.

In the fall of 2020, Havok and Nevaeh entered a tournament for the vacant Knockouts Tag Team Championship, in which they defeated Alisha Edwards and Tenille Dashwood in the quarterfinal round on the November 17 episode of Impact!. Havok and Nevaeh defeated Sea Stars (Ashley Vox and Delmi Exo) at the Final Resolution event. Havok and Nevaeh defeated Jazz and Jordynne Grace in the semifinal on the January 5, 2021 episode of Impact!, to advance to the tournament final against Fire N Flava at the Hard To Kill pay-per-view on January 16. Havok and Nevaeh unsuccessfully challenged Fire N Flava for the titles in a Texas Tornado match at No Surrender. At Sacrifice, Havok and Nevaeh lost to Tenille Dashwood and Kaleb with a K. On the March 30 episode of Impact!, Havok and Nevaeh lost a match to Fire N Flava. Nevaeh turned on Havok by attacking her after the match, blaming her to be the weak link, thus ending their team in the process. This led to a match between the two former partners on the April 15 episode of Before The Impact, which Havok won. Nevaeh would subsequently leave Impact Wrestling after the loss.

=== The Wrestling Revolver (2023) ===
Killer Death Machines reunited as a team after two years at The Wrestling Revolver's Women Grand Prix event on October 8, 2023, where they lost to Jordynne Grace and Killer Kelly.

== Championships and accomplishments ==
- Rise Wrestling
  - Guardians of RISE Championship (1 time)
  - RISE Year End Awards (1 time)
    - Tag Team of the Year (2019)
