= Big Swole =

American professional wrestler

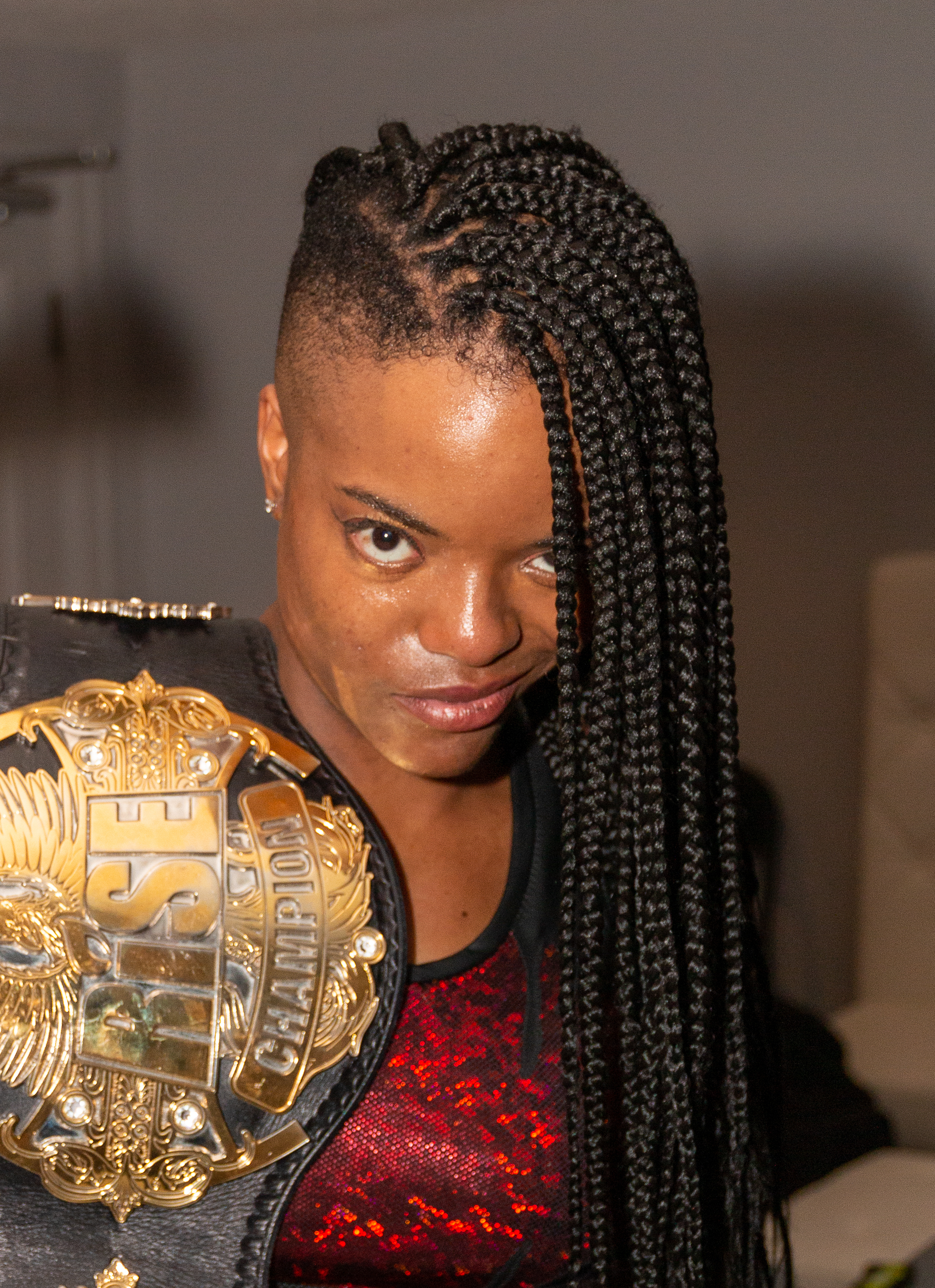
- Swole in 2019

Personal information
- Born: Aerial Hull Clearwater, Florida, U.S.
- Spouse: Cedric Alexander (m. 2018)
- Children: 1

Professional wrestling career
- Ring name(s): Aerial Monroe; Big Swole
- Billed height: 5 ft 5 in (165 cm)
- Billed from: Clearwater, Florida
- Trained by: George South
- Debut: 2015

Aerial Hull, better known by the ring name Big Swole, is an American professional wrestler. She is best known for her tenure in All Elite Wrestling from 2019 to 2021.

== Early life ==
Hull was born in the Tampa suburb of Clearwater, Florida. She went to Clearwater High School and served in the United States Air Force as a fire truck mechanic. She then began her professional wrestling training in North Carolina under George South.

== Professional wrestling career ==
=== Early career (2015–2019) ===
Hull made her professional wrestling debut in 2015. She made an appearance on Raw in August 2016 as Aerial Monroe, during which she competed against Nia Jax in a losing effort. She then competed in the 2018 Mae Young Classic tournament, where she was defeated by Zeuxis in the first round. On August 10, 2019, Hull defeated Zoe Lucas to become the Phoenix of Rise Champion.

=== All Elite Wrestling (2019–2021) ===
On August 31, she appeared in All Elite Wrestling (AEW) under the ring name Big Swole, competing in a 21-woman Casino Battle Royale on the All Out pre-show. In December 2019, AEW announced that Big Swole had signed with the promotion. After making multiple appearances on Dark, Swole made her Dynamite debut on December 11, during which she scored a victory over Emi Sakura in singles competition. In June 2020, she began a rivalry with Britt Baker, which led to her abducting Baker and tossing her into a trash bin during an episode of Dynamite; she was suspended in July for this act. Swole defeated Baker in a Tooth and Nail match, which was taped at Baker's dental office, on September 5 at All Out. On November 30, 2021, Swole announced her departure from AEW, which she later attributed to deficits in structure and diversity; in response, AEW president Tony Khan stated that he "let Swole's contract expire as I felt her wrestling wasn't good enough", whilst giving examples of the diverse structure in management (including himself) & the diversity in performers who had been successful in AEW.

=== Independent circuit (2021–2022) ===
After departing AEW, Swole returned to performing on the independent scene with her latest match being on August 20, 2022.

== Personal life ==
Hull married fellow professional wrestler Cedric Johnson, better known as Cedric Alexander, in June 2018. The couple has a daughter named Adessah. Hull suffers from Crohn's disease.

== Championships and accomplishments ==
- Pro Wrestling Illustrated
  - Ranked No. 39 of the top 100 female wrestlers in the PWI Women's 100 in 2020
- Rise Wrestling
  - Phoenix of Rise Championship (1 time)
  - RISE Year End Award for Wrestler of the Year (2019) – tied with Shotzi Blackheart
- Shine Wrestling
  - Shine Tag Team Championship (1 time) – with Aja Perera
