= Rise Wrestling =

Women's professional wrestling promotion

- Founded: 2016
- Defunct: 2020
- Style: Women's professional wrestling
- Headquarters: Naperville, Illinois
- Founder: Kevin Harvey
- Owner: Kevin Harvey

Rise Wrestling (stylized as RiSE Wrestling or RISE Wrestling and often referred to simply as RiSE) was an American independent women's professional wrestling promotion. It aired events on Internet pay-per-view (iPPV by subscription) and hosts live events around the US. It has been inactive since late 2019 as a result of the COVID-19 pandemic.

== History ==
Rise was created in 2016 by former Shimmer ring announcer and associate executive producer Kevin Harvey. Initially created to be a discovery and development program for Shimmer, the company created wrestling seminars hosted around the nation to introduce talent to the industry, and to scout talent. The company hosted the Rise PPV's and in 2017 began weekly tapings called Rise ASCENT, touring across the US. In 2018, the company announced a partnership with Impact Wrestling and hosted Impact talent on Rise events. Rise held its last event on October 23, 2020.

== Championships ==
As of June 7, 2026

Championship	Current champion(s)	Reign	Date won	Days held	Notes
Phoenix of Rise Championship	Big Swole	1	August 10, 2019	440	Defeated Zoe Lucas.
Guardians of Rise Championship	Killer Death Machines (Jessicka Havok and Neveah)	1	March 29, 2019	574	Defeated Paradise Lost (Dust and Raven's Ash)

The inaugural Phoenix of Rise Champion was Angel Dust, who defeated Britt Baker, Delilah Doom and Kate Carney at RISE 1. The inaugural Guardians of Rise Champions are Paradise Lost who won the titles in a four corners elimination match at RiSE of the Knockouts PPV defeating Chelsea Green and Britt Baker, Jessica Troy and Charli Evans, and Kylie Rae and Miranda Alize.

=== Phoenix of Rise Championship ===
==== Reigns ====
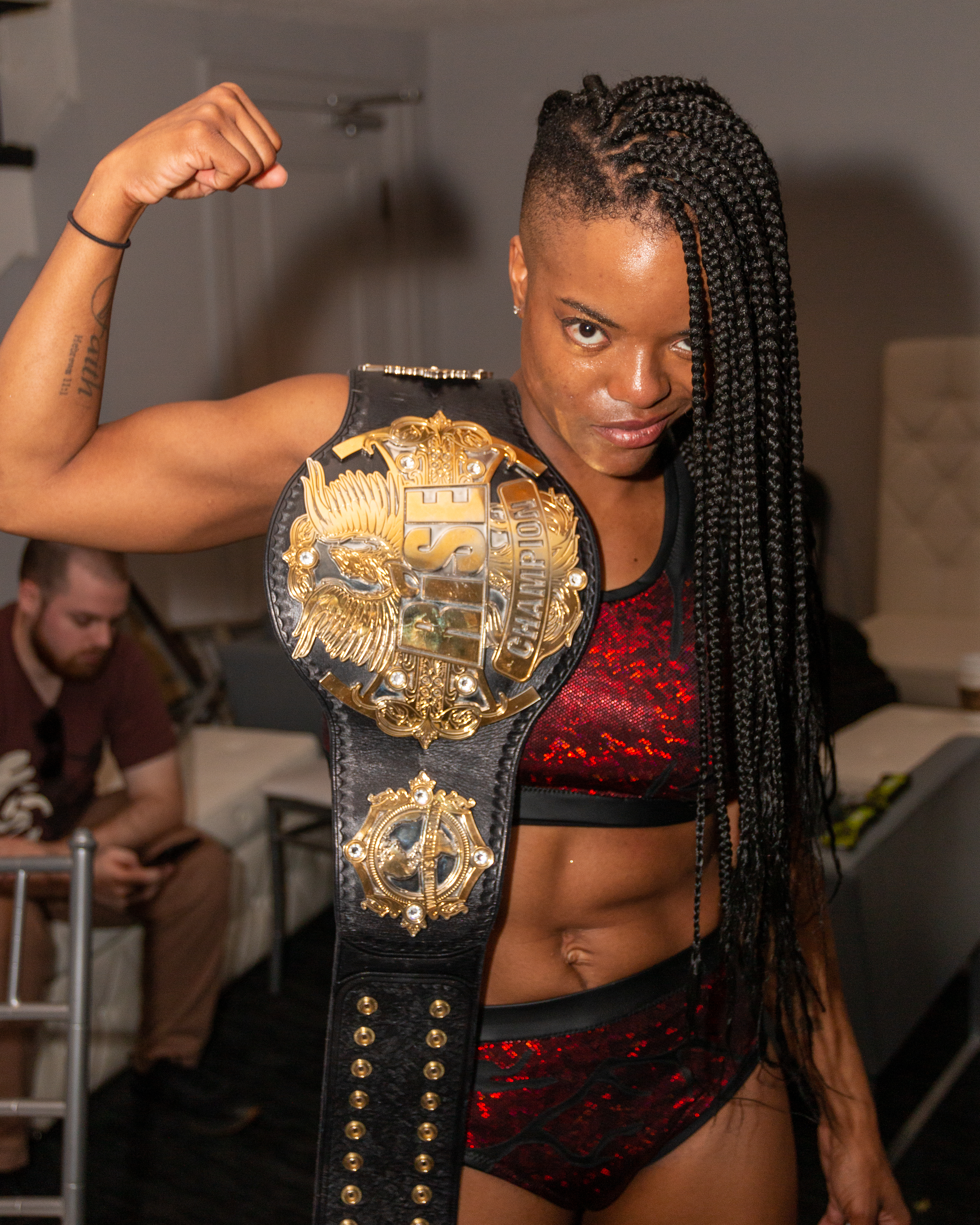
Big Swole with the Phoenix of Rise Championship

As of June 7, 2026.

Key
No.	Overall reign number
Reign	Reign number for the specific champion
Days	Number of days held
Defenses	Number of successful defenses
+	Current reign is changing daily

No.	Champion	Championship change			Reign statistics			Notes	Ref.
No.	Champion	Date	Event	Location	Reign	Days	Defenses	Notes	Ref.
1	Angel Dust	November 10, 2016	RISE 1: Ignite	Berwyn, IL	1	121	2	Dust defeated Britt Baker, Delilah Doom and Kate Carney in a four-way match to become the inaugural champion.	
2	Shotzi Blackheart	March 11, 2017	AIW Girls Night Out 19	Cleveland, OH	1	244	9		
3	Delilah Doom	November 10, 2017	RISE 5: Rising Sun	Berwyn, IL	1	236	4	This was a six-way elimination challenge also involving Britt Baker, Deonna Purrazzo, Dust and Kikyo.	
—	Vacated	July 4, 2018	—	—	—	—	—	Delilah Doom vacated the championship due to injury.	
4	Tessa Blanchard	July 7, 2018	RISE 9: RISE of The Knockouts	Naperville, IL	1	104	1	Blanchard defeated Mercedes Martinez in a 30-minute iron woman match to win the vacant championship.	
5	Mercedes Martinez	October 19, 2018	RISE 10: Insanity	Berwyn, IL	1	161	1	This was a 75-minute iron woman match.	
6	Kylie Rae	March 29, 2019	RISE 13: Legendary	Berwyn, IL	1	<1	0	This was a no rope submission match	
7	Zoe Lucas	March 29, 2019	RISE 13: Legendary	Berwyn, IL	1	134	2	Lucas won a 30-women gauntlet match on RISE 13: Legendary to receive a championship match at any time of her choosing.	
8	Big Swole	August 10, 2019	The Summit	Toronto, ON	1	440	2		

=== Guardians of Rise Championship ===
==== Reigns ====
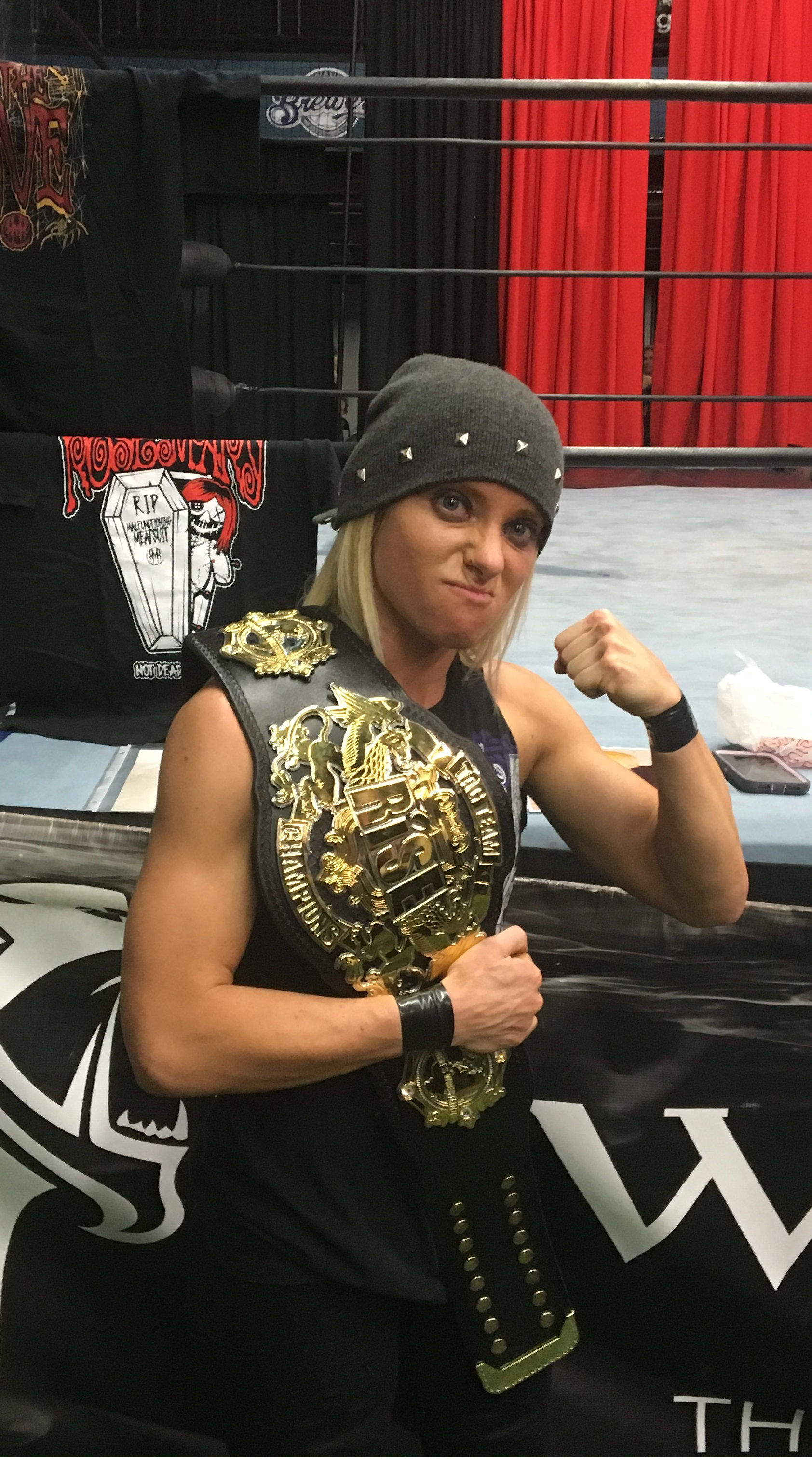
Dust, member of Paradise Lost with one half of the Guardians of Rise Championship

As of June 7, 2026.

Key
No.	Overall reign number
Reign	Reign number for the specific champion
Days	Number of days held
Defenses	Number of successful defenses
+	Current reign is changing daily

No.	Champion	Championship change			Reign statistics			Notes	Ref.
No.	Champion	Date	Event	Location	Reign	Days	Defenses	Notes	Ref.
1	Paradise Lost (Dust and Raven's Ash)	July 7, 2018	RISE 9: RISE of The Knockouts	Naperville, IL	1	265	4	Ash and Dust defeated The Blue Nation (Charli Evans and Jessica Troy), Fire And Nice (Britt Baker and Chelsea Green) and Kylie Rae and Miranda Alize in a four-way tag team elimination match to become the inaugural champions.	
2	Killer Death Machines (Jessicka Havok and Neveah)	March 29, 2019	RISE 13: Legendary	Berwyn, IL	1	574	3		
