= Melanie Cruise =

American professional wrestler (born 1987)

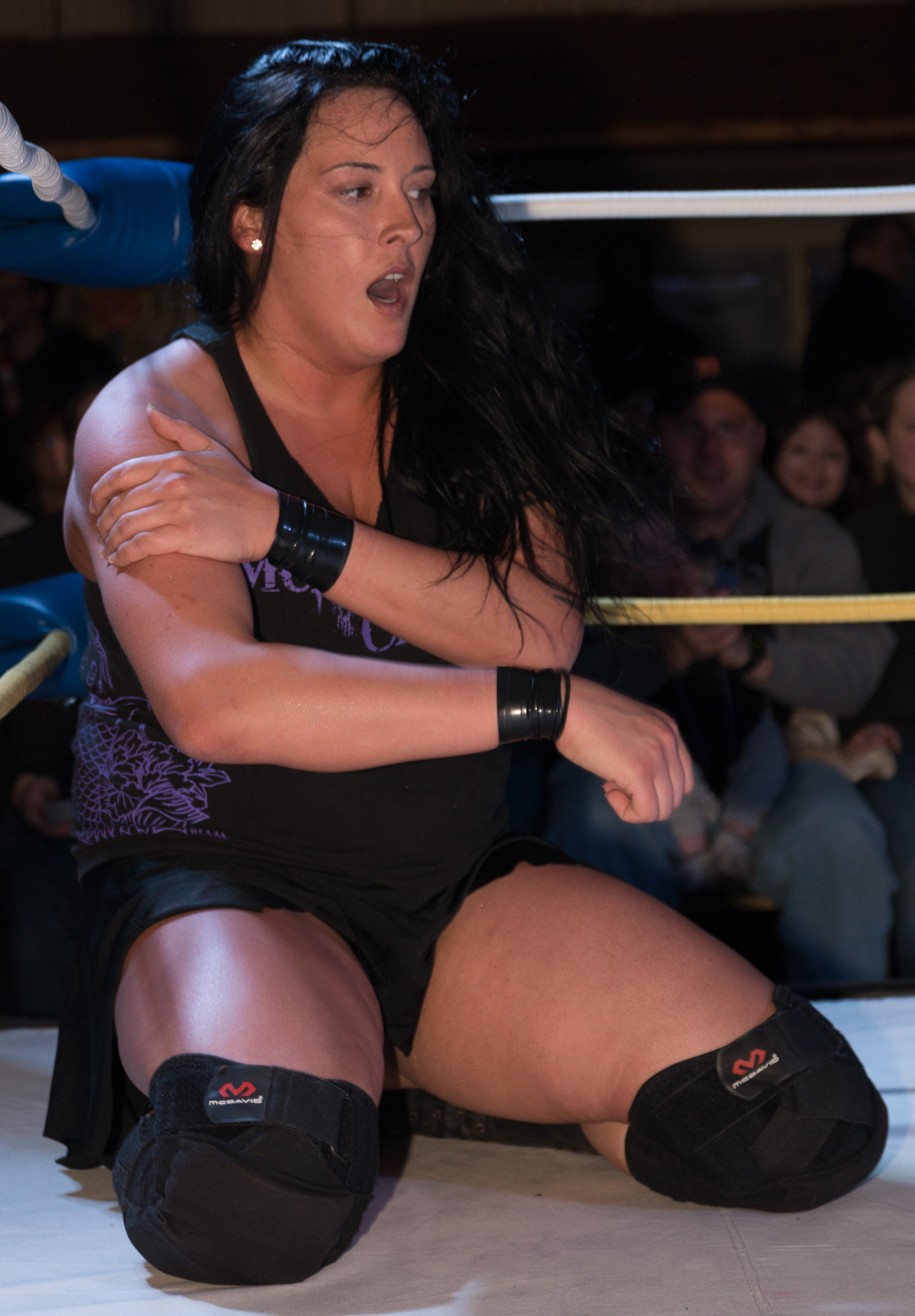
- Cruise post-match in 2016

Personal information
- Born: Melanie Goranson; January 7, 1987 (age 39) Elk Grove Village, Illinois, U.S.

Professional wrestling career
- Ring name(s): Mel; Melanie Cruise; Raven's Ash
- Billed height: 6 ft 0 in (1.83 m)
- Billed weight: 175 lb (79 kg)
- Billed from: Chicago, Illinois
- Trained by: Jimmy Blaze
- Debut: 26 April 2008

Melanie Goranson (born January 7, 1987) is an American professional wrestler, better known by her ring name Melanie Cruise. She is best known for her appearances in All Elite Wrestling (AEW), SHIMMER and POWW Entertainment. She currently performs for several Northern United States–based independent promotions and was the first Resistance Pro Wrestling Women's champion.

== Personal life ==
Goranson is a native of Elk Grove Village, Illinois. She has one child.

== Early life ==
Born to James "Jim" Goranson and Wendy Goranson in Chicago, Goranson competed in track and basketball at Elk Grove High School in Illinois and competed on the track team at Western Illinois University, before starting her wrestling career. Her siblings are all athletes. Her brother Jim was an All-State football player for Elk Grove High School in Illinois, who went on to play college football at University of Illinois and Georgetown University. Her younger sister Danielle "Dani" Goranson was an All-State softball player for Elk Grove, going an impressive 83–17 with a 1.20 ERA and 284 strikeouts in four seasons. Dani went on to play college softball at Michigan State University from 2013 to 2016. Her other sister Nikki played college softball at Robert Morris. Her brother Mike wrestled for the U.S. Marine Corps, where he served and earned a Purple Heart. Their father "Jim" Goranson coached softball at Regina Dominican High School in Wilmette, Illinois from 2011 to 2013 and 2017–18, and also coached softball at Oakton Community College for two seasons.

== Career ==
=== POWW Entertainment (2008–2012) ===
Trained by Ruff Crossing, Jimmy Blaze and Scott Spade, she debuted for POWW on April 26, 2008. It was a tag team match teaming up with Kanoa to go against Traci Brooks and Chris Cairo. After she took part in a Triple Threat Match also including Mia Martinez and The Great Cheyenne, the eventual winner. Because Cheyenne won the match and didn't beat Cruise, they started a feud, eventually ending in Cruise beating Cheyenne in a best of three falls match. After that Melanie Cruise started another feud with Taylor Made, defeating her also in a Street Fight Match by landing The Cruise Control onto a garbage can. Melanie still competes for POWW in 2012 and is currently involved in a feud with Stacey Shadows

=== Shimmer Women Athletes (2008–2018) ===
She made her first appearance for SHIMMER Women Athletes back on Volume 21 SPARKLE as she defeated Cherry Bomb in a Dark Match to win a future spot in the Main Roster. She made her DVD debut on Volume 23 where she was defeated by "The Scream Queen" Daffney after her Daff Knees. She then aligned with Annie Social and Wesna Busic forming the Social Club. After missing Volume 24 she came back as part of Volume 25 losing to Nikki Roxx after a Barbie Crusher. Later in the night she took part in a Fatal 4 Way including Jennifer Blake, Kellie Skater and eventual winner Jessie McKay. On November 8 she teamed with Wesna Busic to defeat the Former SHIMMER Tag Team Champions Ashley Lane and Nevaeh. She continued her winning streak by defeating the debuting Kimberly Kash on Volume 28. Since her tag team partner Wesna Busic retired she started teaming up with her manager Annie Social and as part of the Volume 29 they lost a #1 Contender Tag Team Match against the team of Nikki Roxx and Portuguese Princess Ariel. Later that night however they scored their first victory as a team against Jessica James and Rachel Summerlyn. On Volume 31 Melanie Cruise scored a huge win against Allison Danger thanks to the help of her manager Annie Social. In the after match the duo continued to attack Allison until Jennifer Blake made the save. As part of Volume 32 they lost a Tag Team Grudge Match against the Ultimate Punch (Jennifer and Allison).

=== Supreme Wrestling Entertainment (2011–2012) ===
She made her debut with Supreme Wrestling Entertainment on May 25, 2011, in Rubicon, Wisconsin. She took on and defeated Nikki St. John. She had originally been scheduled to take on Taylor Made, but Melanie Cruise had "Made Sure" Taylor didn't make it to the show, so she was replaced by Nikki. Melanie Cruise and Nikki St. John once again squared off on July 4, 2011. This time Nikki St. John got the win. She once again returned to SWE on August 6, 2011, at the West Bend Harley-Davidson 65th Anniversary Bash in West Bend, WI in a losing effort against TNA Impact Wrestling Knockout Traci Brooks. On December 17, 2011, Taylor Made finally got her hands on Melanie Cruise, but Cruise took the victory. The feud between Melanie Cruise and Nikki St. John continued on July 4, 2012, where Melanie picked up another victory on Nikki. Then on September 1, 2012, in a shocking event, Nikki beat Melanie with help from the crafty Chazz Moretti. It was immediately announced that Nikki was the newest member of the Moretti Agency.

=== Global Force Wrestling (2015) ===
On July 9, 2015, Cruise made her debut for Global Force Wrestling (GFW), unsuccessfully challenging Santana Garrett for the NWA World Women's Championship.

=== All Elite Wrestling (2019–2021) ===
Cruise made her All Elite Wrestling (AEW) debut on the December 4, 2019, episode of Dynamite as a fan, plucked from the audience by Brandi Rhodes. After she had her hair cut by Rhodes, she joined The Nightmare Collective, led by Rhodes and including Awesome Kong and Dr. Luther. However, the angle was poorly received by fans and was dropped in February after Kong left the promotion to film GLOW.

== Championships and accomplishments ==
- Allied Independent Wrestling Federations
  - AIWF Women's Championship (1 time)
- Cape Championship Wrestling
  - CCW Women's Championship (1 time)
- Pro Wrestling Illustrated
  - Ranked No. 25 of the best 50 female singles wrestlers in the PWI Female 50 in 2012
- Resistance Pro Wrestling
  - RPW Women's Championship (2 times)
- Rise Wrestling
  - Guardians of Rise Championship (1 time) – with Dust
  - Rise Tag Team of the Year (2018) – with Dust
