= Zoe Lucas =

English professional wrestler

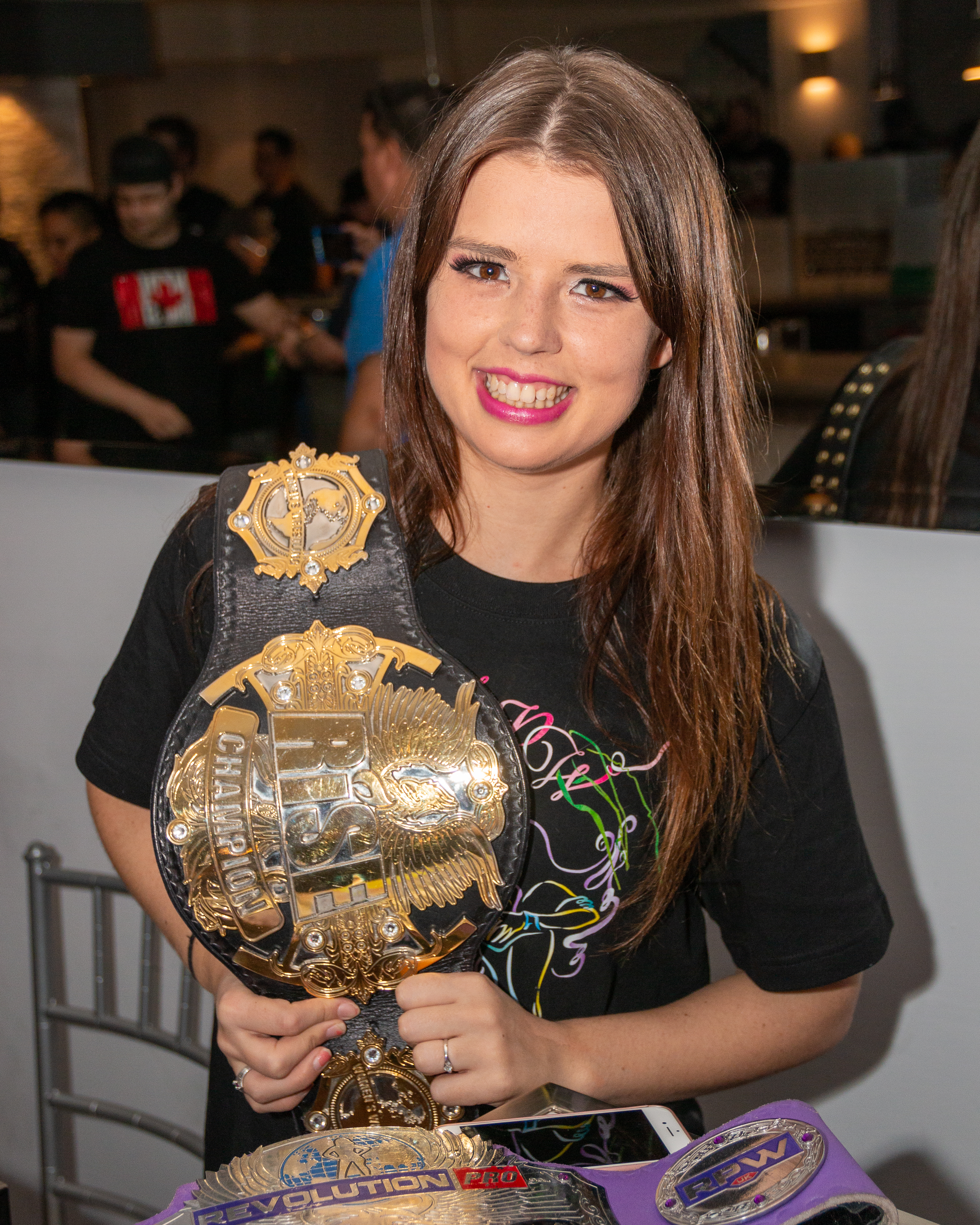
- Lucas as the Phoenix of Rise Champion in 2019

Personal information
- Born: 2 May 1992 (age 34) Portsmouth, England
- Spouses: James Castle (died 2024)

Professional wrestling career
- Ring name(s): Zoe Lucas; Monster Z. Sullivan
- Billed height: 5 ft 8 in (173 cm)
- Billed weight: 114 lb (52 kg)
- Debut: 27 June 2015

Zoe Lucas (born 2 May 1992) is an English professional wrestler. She is best known for her work on the independent circuit with promotions such as Rise Wrestling, Shimmer Women Athletes, World Wonder Ring Stardom, Pro-Wrestling: EVE, and Revolution Pro Wrestling, becoming a one-time RevPro British Women's Champion in the latter.

== Early life ==
Lucas was born in Portsmouth on 2 May 1992.

== Professional wrestling career ==
Lucas debuted as part of an English faction on 27 June 2015. She first visited Japan in February 2017 to wrestle for World Wonder Ring Stardom, returning a second time in May 2018 and a third time in June 2019. After joining the faction Stars, she turned on them and joined Hana Kimura's faction Tokyo Cyber Squad in their first match. At the Nagoya Games on 15 July, she challenged for the Artist of Stardom Championship held by Mayu Iwatani, Saki Kashima, and Tam Nakano, who also participated in Tokyo Cyber Squad, but did not win the title. That year, she also competed in British promotions such as Revolution Pro Wrestling (RevPro) and Pro-Wrestling: EVE and American promotions such as SHIMMER and Rise Wrestling.

Lucas retired in November 2022 before returning to RevPro in February 2025.

== Personal life ==
Lucas was married to fellow wrestler James Castle until his death from cancer in June 2024.

== Championships and accomplishments ==
- Ironfist Wrestling
  - Ironfist Women's Championship (1 time)
- Pro-Wrestling: EVE
  - Pro-Wrestling: EVE Tag Team Championship (1 time) – with Amira Blair
- Pro Wrestling Illustrated
  - Ranked No. 79 of the top 100 female singles wrestlers in the PWI Women's 100 in 2020
- Revolution Pro Wrestling
  - RevPro British Women's Championship (1 time)
  - Queen of the Ring (2021)
- Rise Wrestling
  - Phoenix of Rise Championship (1 time)
- Other
  - 24/7 365 Open Challenge Championship
