= A. Q. A. =

American wrestler (born 1996)

Personal information
- Born: Angela Quentina Arnold; September 10, 1996 (age 30) Gilbertown, Alabama, United States

Professional wrestling career
- Ring name(s): A. Q. A. Angela; Zayda Ramier
- Billed from: Gilbertown, Alabama, United States
- Trained by: Booker T
- Debut: February 17, 2018
- Retired: July 18, 2022

Angela Quentina Arnold (born September 10, 1996), better known by the ring name A. Q. A., is an American professional wrestler. She began to work with Booker T's Reality of Wrestling promotion in 2018. She also worked for All Elite Wrestling (AEW) in 2022 and WWE in 2021 as Zayda Ramier.

== Professional wrestling career ==
Arnold was trained by Booker T in his promotion Reality of Wrestling. During her years in the promotion, she won the women's title, ROW Diamonds Division Championship twice. On June 18, 2022, AQA challenged Athena for the Warrior Wrestling Women's Championship but lost.

On March 31, 2021, Arnold, going by the ring name Zayda Ramier, made her WWE debut competing on NXT, in a tag team match facing The Way (Candice LeRae and Indi Hartwell) teaming with Gigi Dolin which they lost. On the April 27 episode of NXT, Ramier faced Toni Storm and won the match making this her first win in WWE. In July Ramier was medically disqualified to wrestle for the company despite her debating to the WWE medics that the reason she felt she was going pass out was due to dehydration. On November 4 Ramier was released by WWE.

On February 9, 2022, AQA made her debut in All Elite Wrestling on Dynamite where she faced Jade Cargill for the AEW TBS championship which AQA lost. Two days later Tony Khan announced that she was signed to the company, but six months later, on July 18, AQA announced she was stepping away from professional wrestling for the immediate future as it had taken a mental and physical strain on her.

On May 7th, 2025, Arnold announced on her social media that she would be making her return to pro wrestling for the first time in three years at a New Texas Pro Wrestling event on June 1, 2025. At the event, AQA and Charity King lost to the team of Vert Vixen and Yuka Sakazaki.

== Championships and accomplishments ==
- Reality of Wrestling
  - ROW Diamonds Division Championship (2 times)
