= Shimmer Women Athletes =

American independent professional wrestling promotion

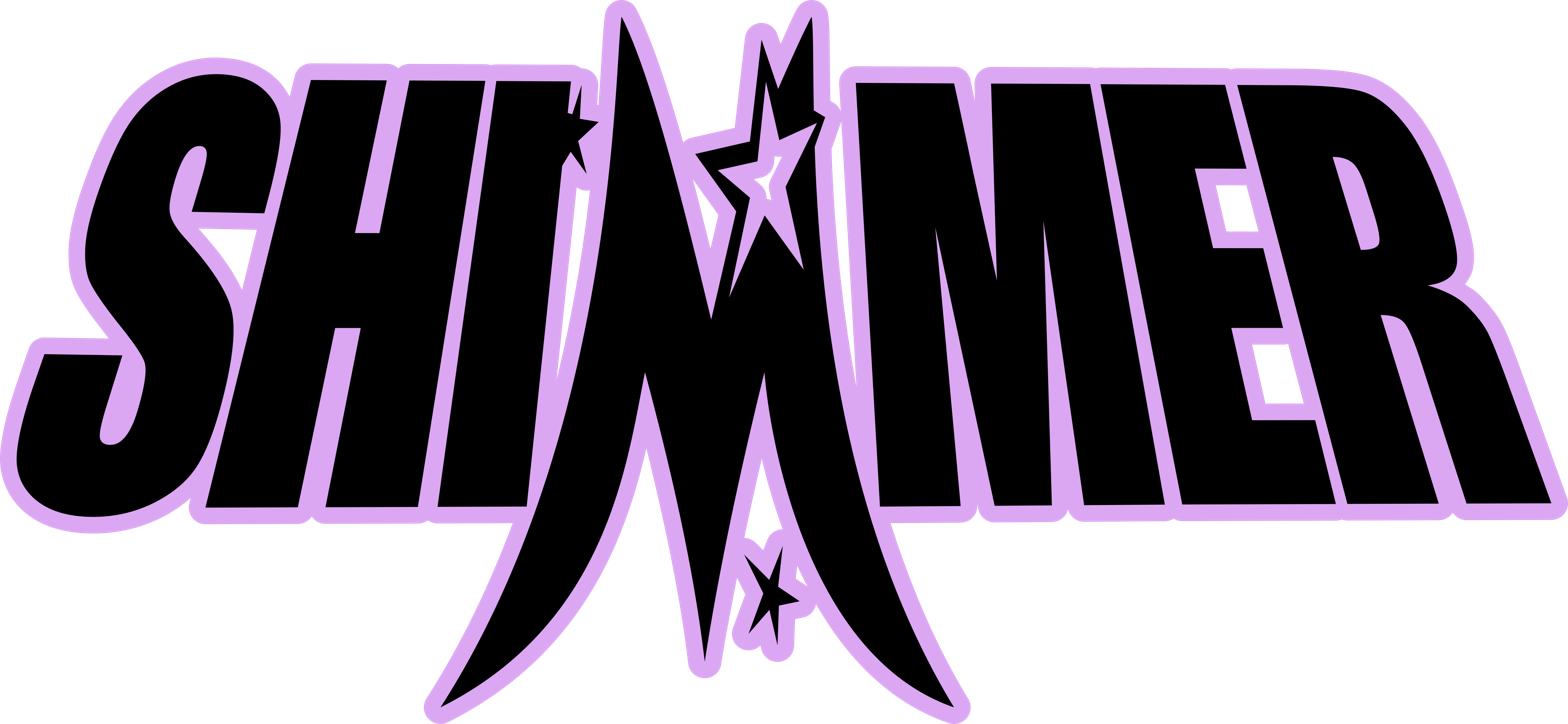
- Acronym: SHIMMER
- Founded: November 6, 2005
- Defunct: November 1, 2021
- Style: Women's professional wrestling
- Headquarters: Berwyn, Illinois
- Founders: Dave Prazak; Allison Danger
- Sister: Shine Wrestling; Rise Wrestling

Shimmer Women Athletes (often referred to and stylized as SHIMMER) was an American, Chicago-based independent women's professional wrestling promotion which held its first event on November 6, 2005. Established by Dave Prazak and run by both him and Allison Danger, the promotion was created to give female wrestling talent from North America and beyond a serious, non-objectifying platform on which to display their skills. On November 1, 2021, the promotion was shut down.

== History ==
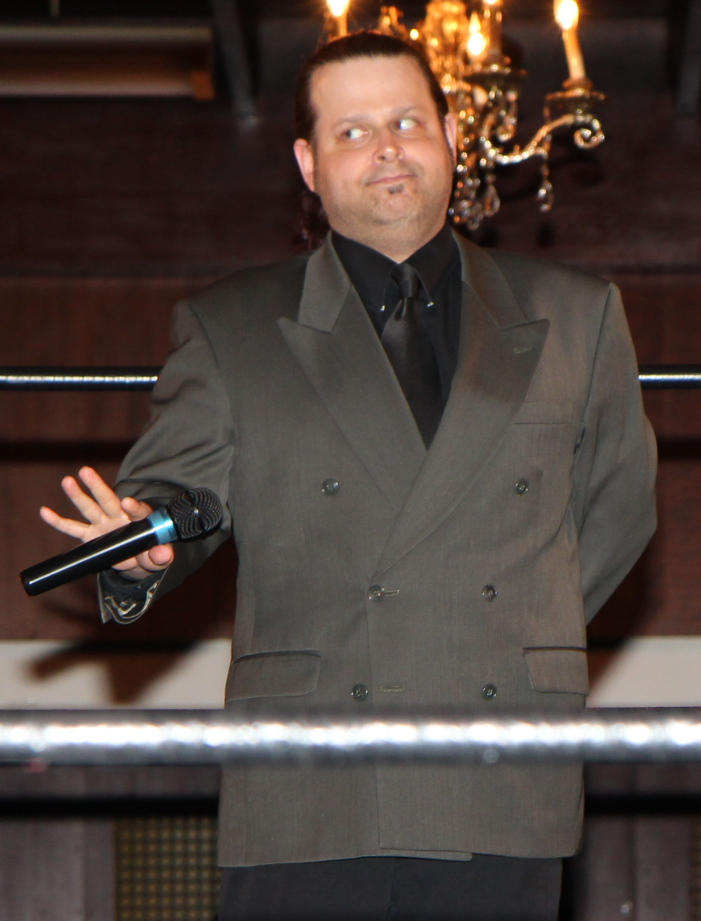
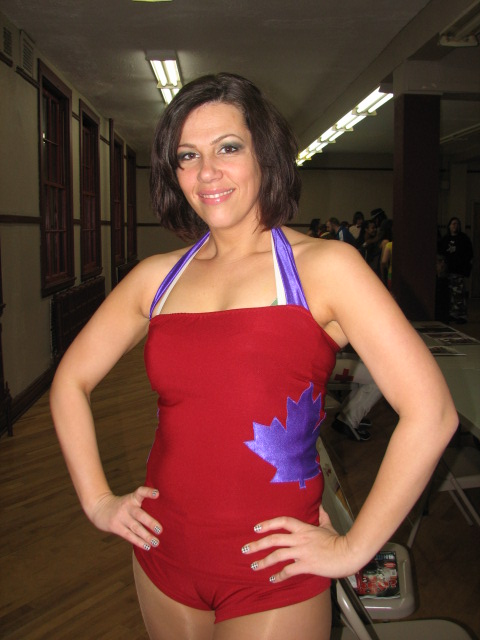
SHIMMER founders Dave Prazak and Allison Danger

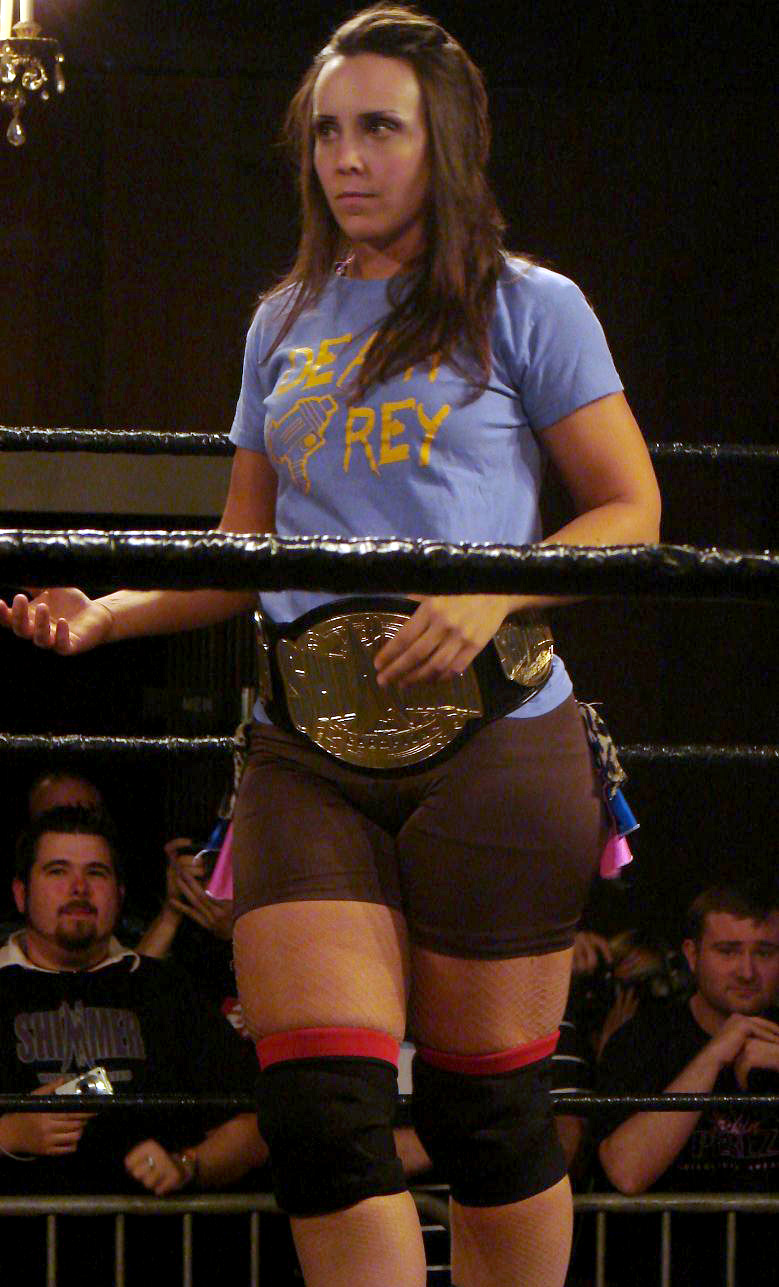
Inaugural Shimmer Champion Sara Del Rey with the title in 2007.

Shimmer Women Athletes was founded in late 2005 by veteran promoter Dave Prazak and former wrestler Allison Danger as a Chicago-area independent promotion solely for women. Prazak created Shimmer to fill a “serious, non-objectifying platform” for female wrestlers at a time when North America had almost no all‐women’s promotions. As Slam Wrestling noted in 2006, Shimmer "fills an extreme void" by showing "talented women wrestlers taking part in real matches" without the Diva Search or strip-show gimmicks common in other women’s divisions, such as what WWE was promoting at the time. Prazak insisted the goal was simply to give top women wrestlers "a platform to do that"; an opportunity they otherwise lacked on the indie scene. From its very first event (November 6, 2005, in Berwyn, Illinois), Shimmer set out to raise the standard of women's wrestling in North America, packaging each quarterly show into two DVD volumes and distributing them nationally.

In 2005, Shimmer held its debut show on November 6 in Berwyn, IL. The inaugural card featured Sara Del Rey, Daizee Haze, Mercedes Martinez, Beth Phoenix and other top independents, immediately packing out the new promotion's DVD releases.

Between 2005 and 2011, Shimmer adopted a quarterly "super-show" model, running one big show roughly every three months at the Eagles Club in Berwyn. Each taping yielded two DVDs sold initially through Ring of Honor's online store, reflecting Prazak’s ROH connections. During this period, Shimmer was effectively a "sister promotion" to ROH: Ring of Honor would periodically feature Shimmer’s top women on its cards and even recognize the Shimmer Championship and Tag Team titles. Full Impact Pro, another ROH affiliate, likewise acknowledged Shimmer’s titles.

In June 2007, Shimmer introduced its first championship belt. A 16-woman tournament was held at a two-day taping to crown the inaugural Shimmer Champion. Sara Del Rey won the tournament (defeating Lacey in the finals) and became the first titleholder, ending the promotion’s initial "score-settling" format and giving its athletes a traditional wrestling prize.

In September 2008, the promotion opened its own wrestling school for women. This provided formal training for up-and-coming talent and reinforced Shimmer’s role not just as a showcase but as a development system for female wrestlers.

In 2011, SHIMMER began distributing its own DVDs rather than relying on third-party outlets. The decision was intended to allow the company to retain full revenue from sales and reinvest it into future events. This move also marked the beginning of a gradual separation from its long-standing partnership with Ring of Honor. In the years that followed, SHIMMER wrestlers appeared less frequently on ROH programming. In response to the reduced collaboration, ROH developed its own women’s division in 2015 under the name Women of Honor. The division initially featured a mix of wrestlers, valets, and managers, and its matches were used to expand ROH’s representation of women’s wrestling. In 2018, the company introduced the Women of Honor Championship, which was rebranded as the ROH Women’s World Championship in 2020.

In 2012, Shimmer launched a sister promotion, Shine Wrestling, in July. Shine was created as a regular iPPV series under the WWNLive banner to continue and expand storylines from Shimmer, and to put "women’s wrestling and their athletic ability" even more front-and-center. Shimmer and Shine together aimed to carry on rivalries and push new talent.

In 2016, Rise Wrestling debuted as another Shimmer‑aligned brand (initially as a developmental program), further extending Shimmer's influence. Shimmer’s alumni and associates were closely involved in Rise's launch a decade later.

In 2020, SHIMMER produced only one volume, as the COVID-19 pandemic disrupted live events and limited the company’s ability to hold tapings. The pandemic placed considerable strain on independent wrestling promotions, including SHIMMER, which relied on in-person audiences and regular filming schedules to sustain its operations.

In 2021, after more than 15 years of operation, Shimmer held its final tapings. On November 1, 2021, the company officially shut down and retired all its championships. Reports and statements from those involved indicated that financial challenges and the effects of the pandemic were central factors in the decision. The women’s wrestling market in North America had become increasingly crowded by that point, with numerous independent promotions and streaming platforms competing for limited audiences. Rising production and travel costs added further pressure. SHIMMER's continued reliance on physical DVD sales also placed it at a disadvantage in a period when most wrestling content had shifted toward digital streaming. The combination of these factors made ongoing operations unsustainable, leading to the company’s closure.

== Legacy and influence ==
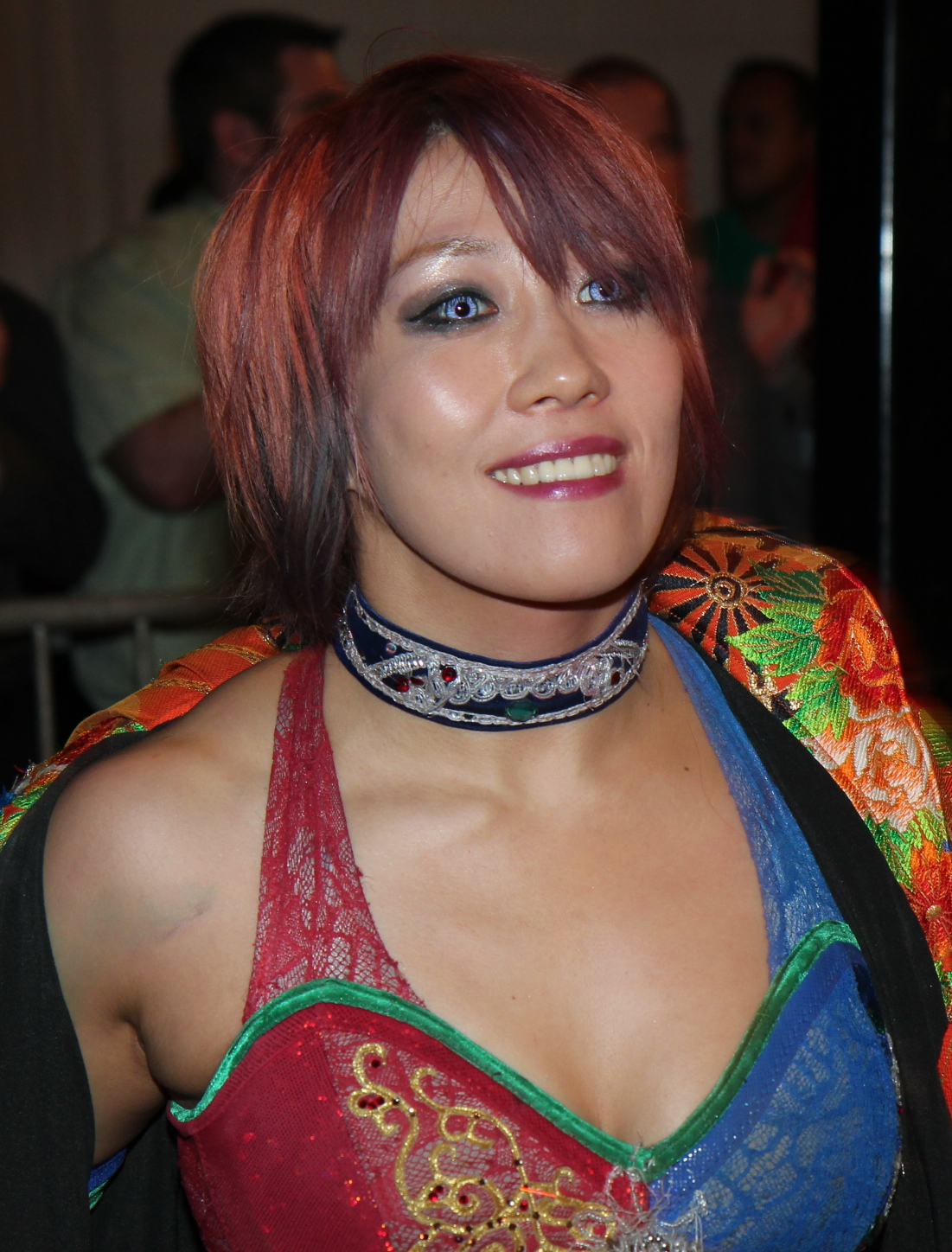
KANA, later known as Asuka

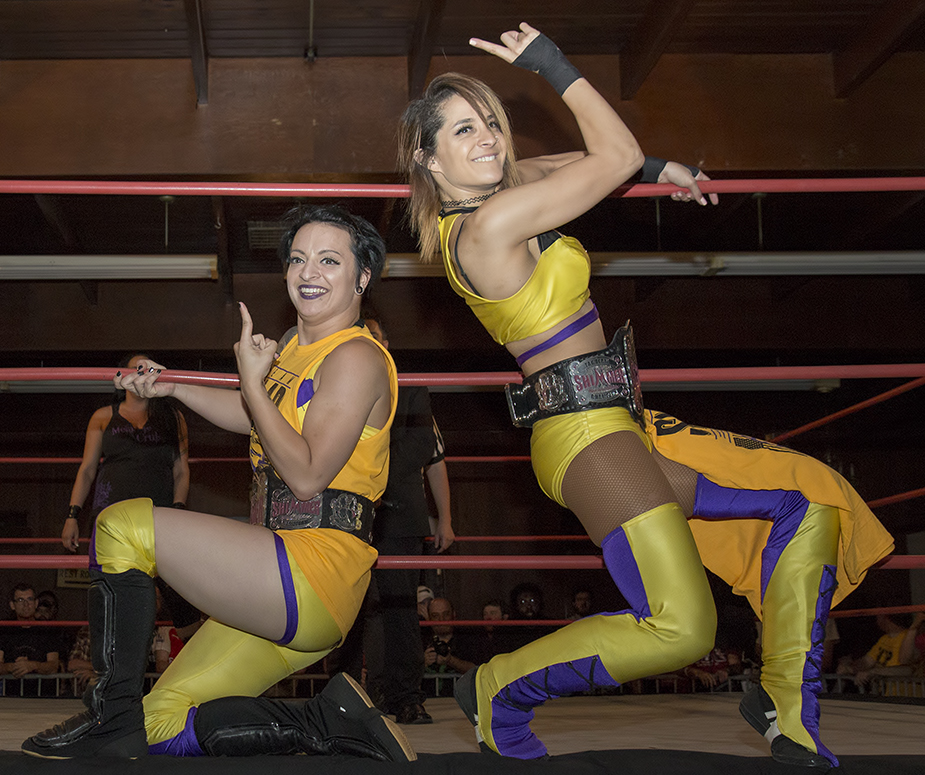
Evie, later known as Dakota Kai and Heidi Lovelace, later known as Ruby Riott/Soho

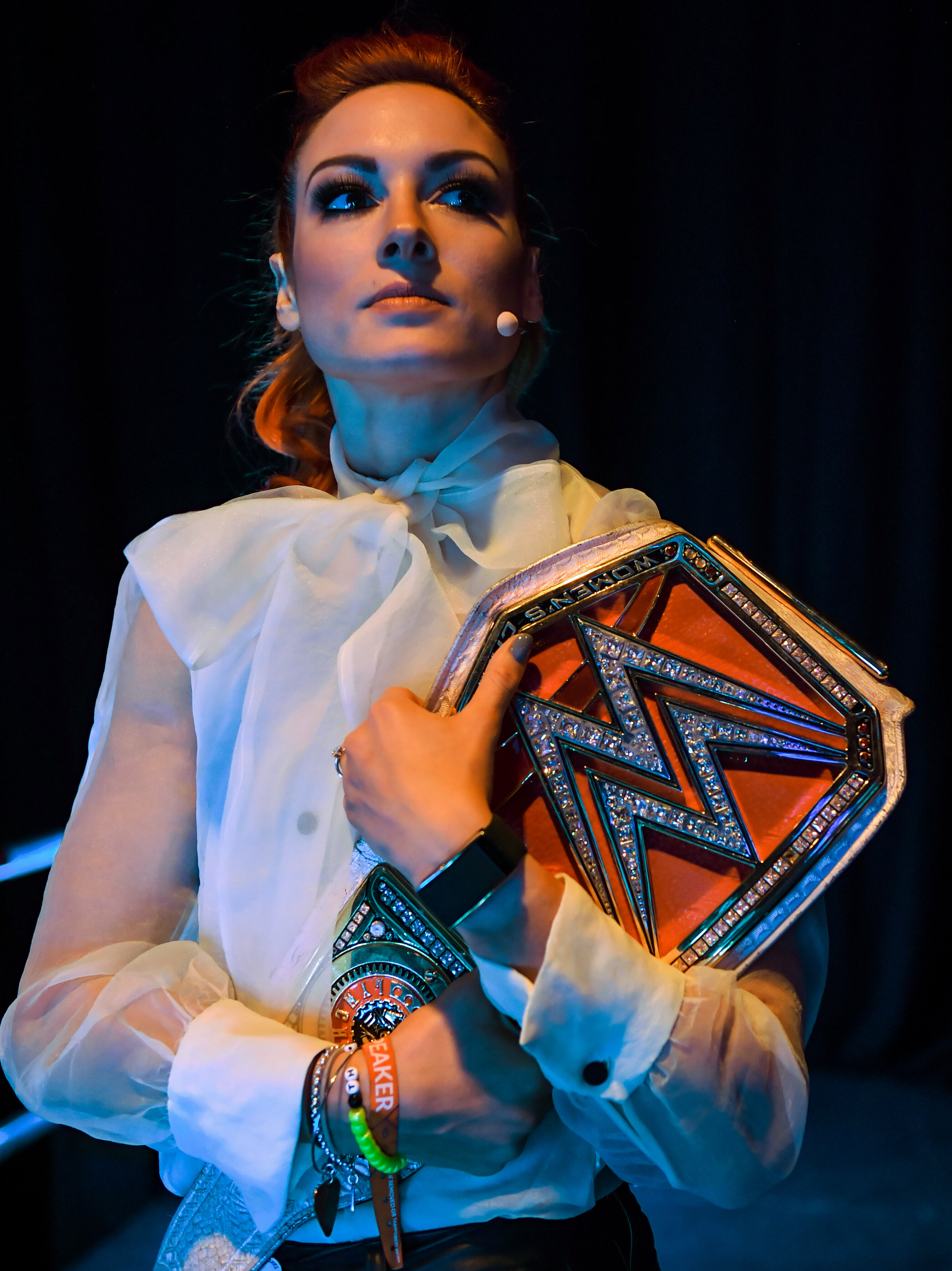
Rebecca Knox, later known as Becky Lynch

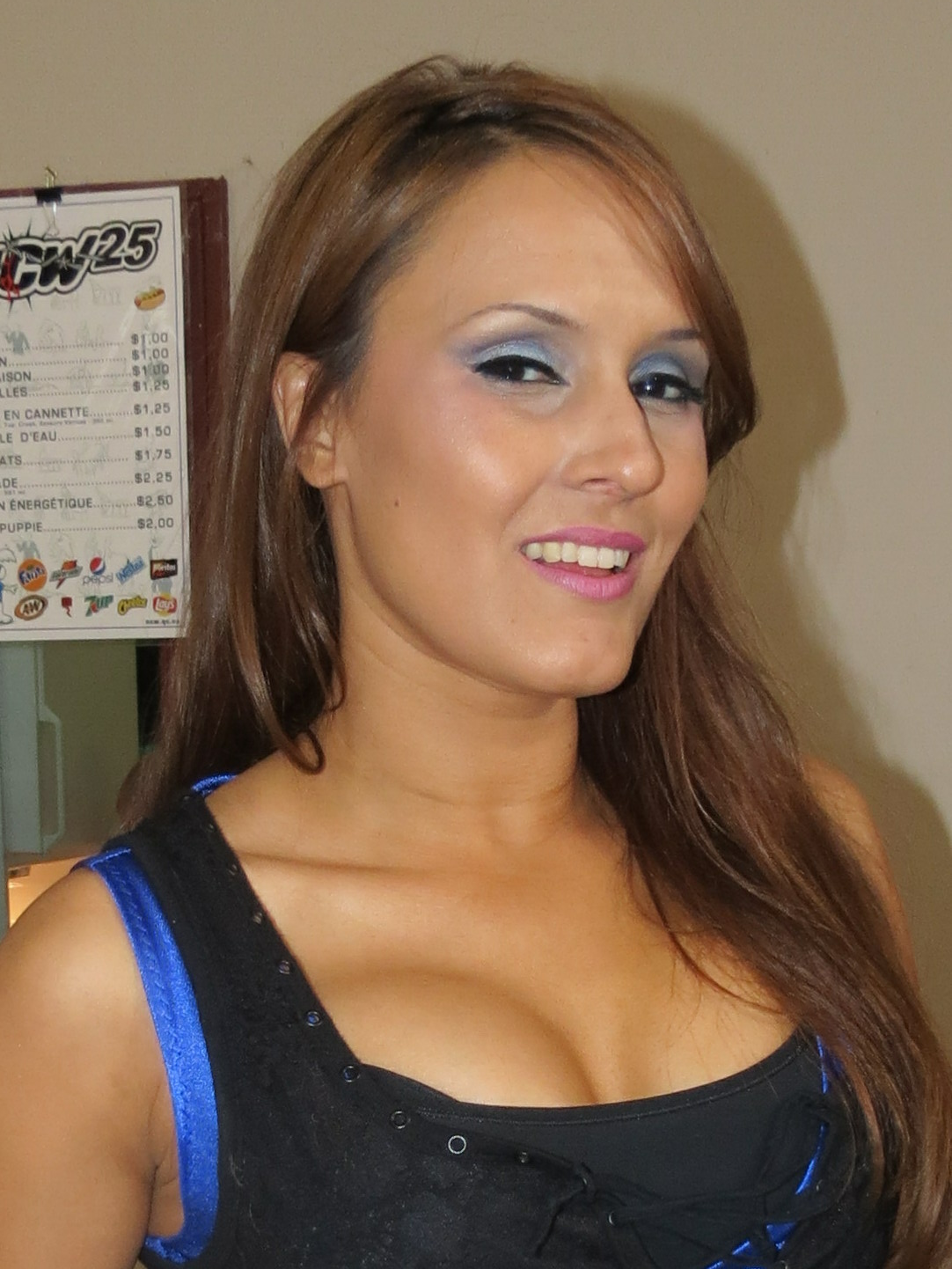
Cheerleader Melissa

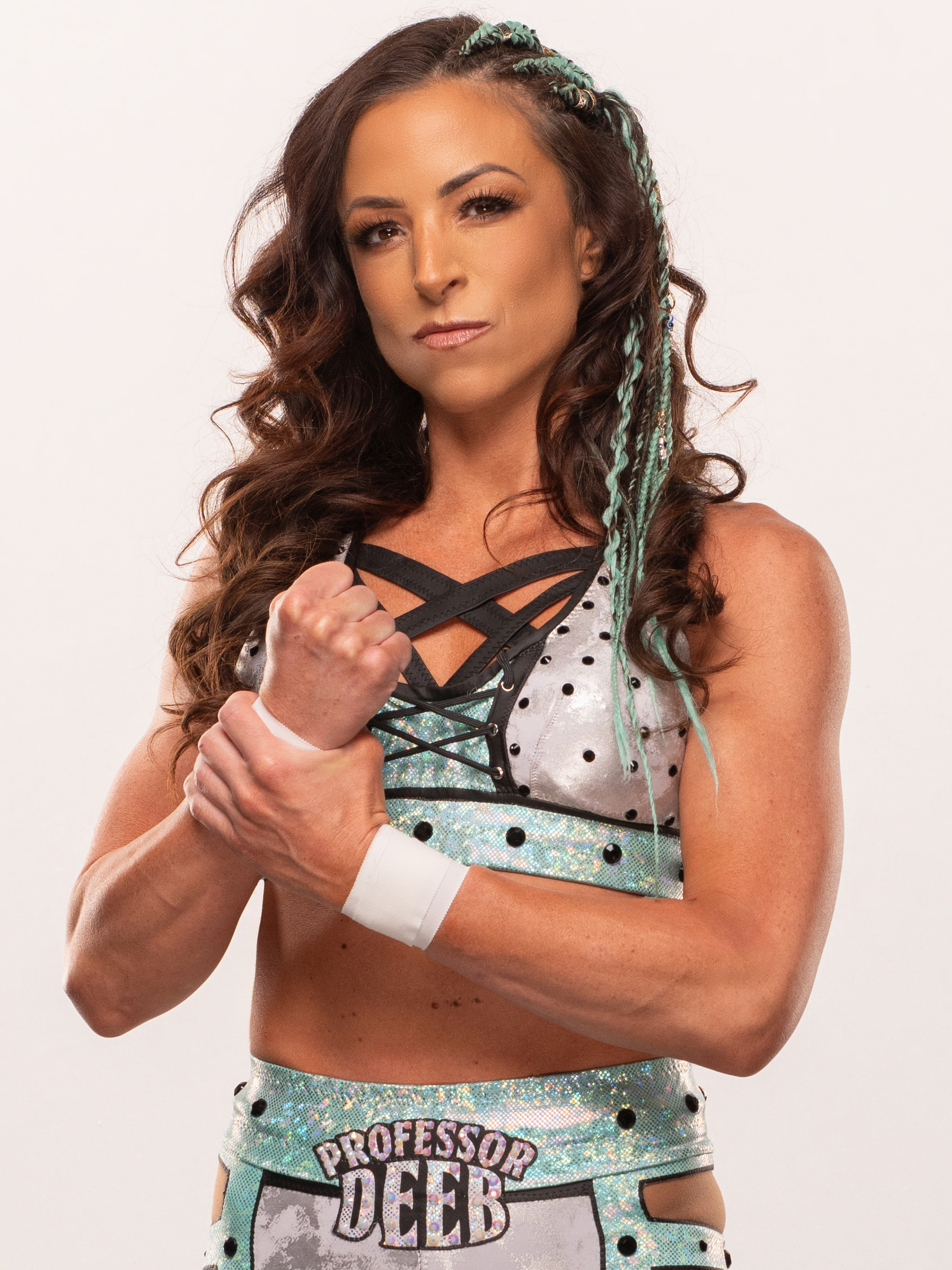
Serena Deeb

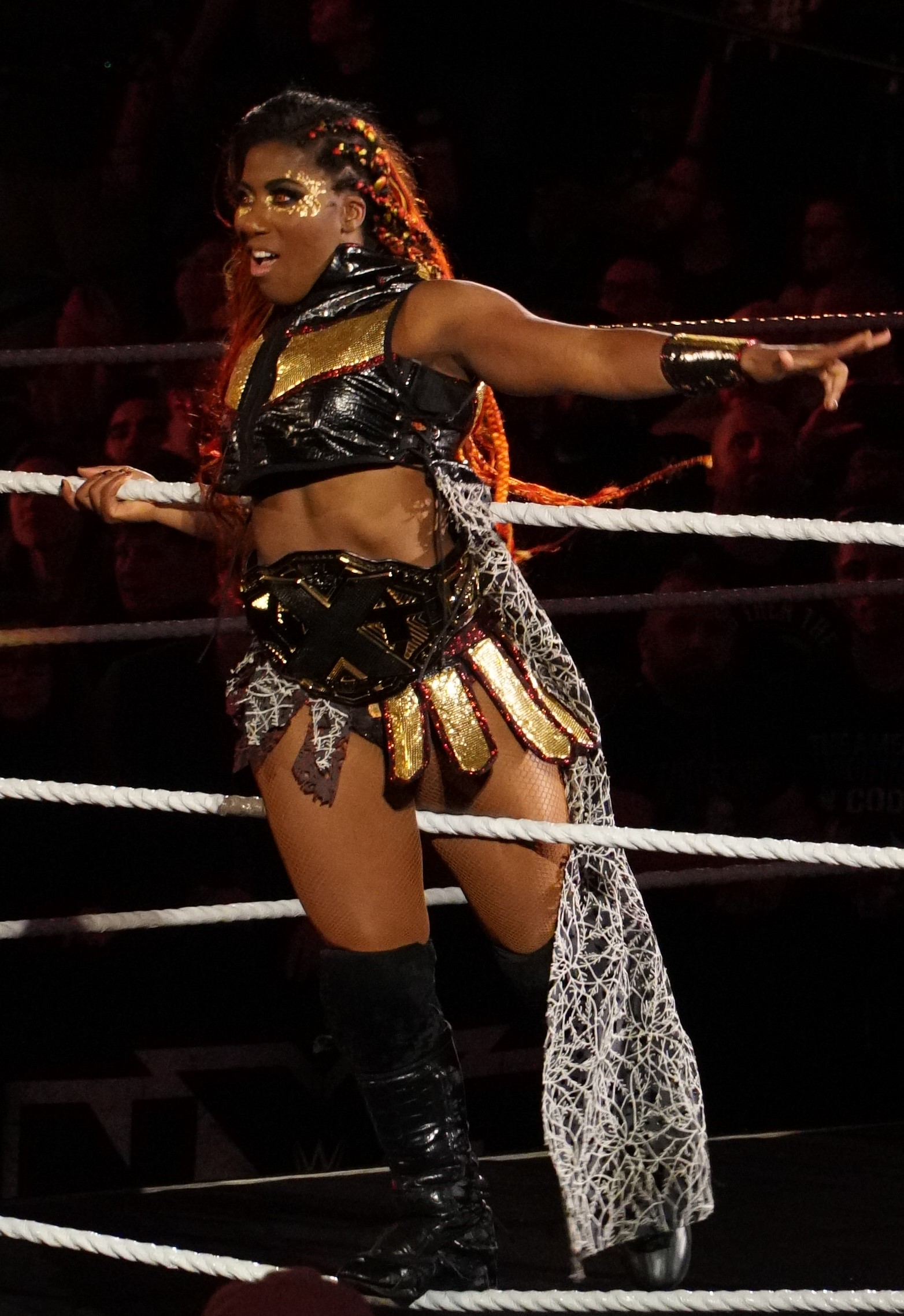
Athena, also known as Ember Moon

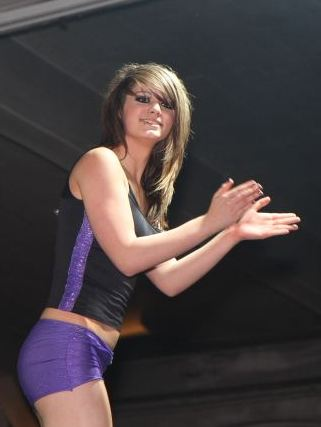
Britani Knight, later known as Paige and Saraya

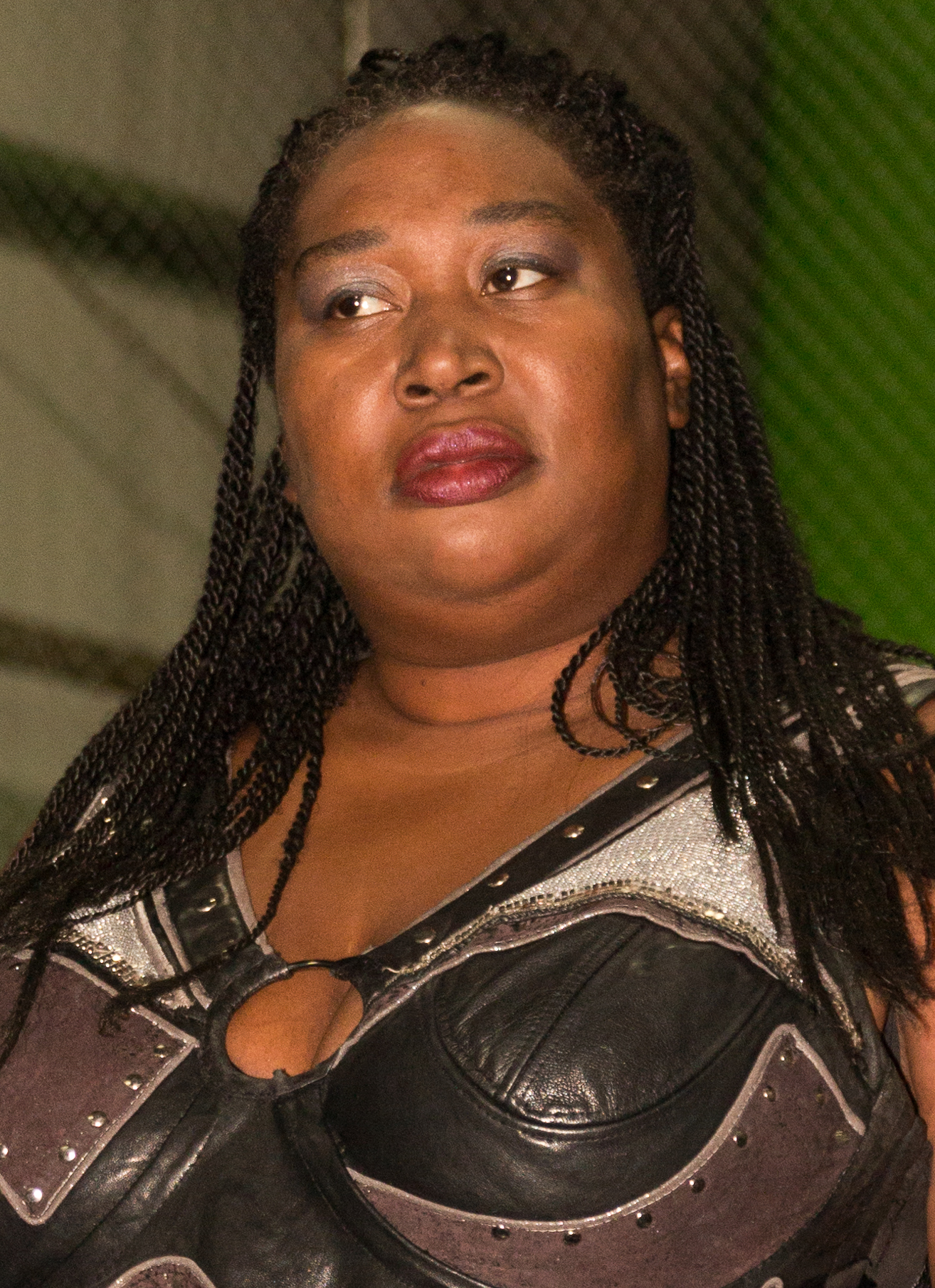
Awesome Kong

Shimmer produced a generation of women wrestlers who would later stock the ranks of major televised promotions in the United States

Shimmer Women Athletes played a significant role in shaping the direction of women’s wrestling on the independent circuit and provided early exposure for many wrestlers who later achieved mainstream success. The promotion presented its competitors as skilled athletes rather than novelties, contributing to a broader shift in how women’s wrestling was perceived in North America. By treating its roster as serious athletes, Shimmer changed perceptions: as Prazak put it, fans would finally realize "good women wrestlers are not only in Japan, they are all over the place” when they saw Shimmer’s 30-minute classic matches". Prazak specifically hailed a Daizee Haze vs Rebecca Knox (later Becky Lynch) in a 2-out-of-3 falls match as "probably the best women's match I’ve seen on U.S. soil". In that vein, Shimmer’s hard-hitting, athletic style paved the way for the broader Women’s Evolution in wrestling; veteran Mercedes Martinez noted in 2021 that companies like Shimmer "literally put in the forefront athleticism and athletes" in women’s wrestling.

A substantial number of wrestlers who performed in Shimmer went on to appear in major companies. Kanako Urai of Japan (known as KANA in Shimmer and later as Asuka in WWE) and New Zealander Evie (later Dakota Kai) are among those who transitioned to global promotions. Other prominent names include Serena Deeb, Mercedes Martinez, Athena, Cheerleader Melissa (also known as Alissa Flash), Awesome Kong, Britani Knight (later Paige/Saraya), many of whom have held championship titles or major roles in WWE, AEW, NXT, TNA and other wrestling promotions. Shimmer’s focus on competitive wrestling rather than presentation-based divisions offered a professional platform that contrasted with how women’s wrestling was often framed in the early 2000s.

SHIMMER produced an extensive library of recorded events and contributed to the rise of other all-women’s promotions such as Women Superstars United in New Jersey and NCW Femmes Fatales in Canada. Its distribution through DVD sales and online streaming services like WWNLive increased visibility for independent women’s wrestling at a time when such opportunities were limited.

== Championships ==
=== Final Champions ===
Championship	Current champion(s)	Reign	Date won	Days held	Location	Notes
Shimmer Championship	Zoey Skye	1	October 31, 2021	1	Berwyn, Illinois	Defeated Kimber Lee at Volume 120.
Shimmer Tag Team Championship	Team Sea Stars (Ashley Vox and Delmi Exo)	1	November 2, 2019	730	Berwyn, Illinois	Defeated Cheerleader Melissa and Mercedes Martinez at Volume 115.
Heart of Shimmer Championship	Nevaeh	1	October 31, 2021	1	Berwyn, Illinois	Defeated Hyan at Volume 119.
