= Nevaeh (wrestler) =

American professional wrestler (born 1986)

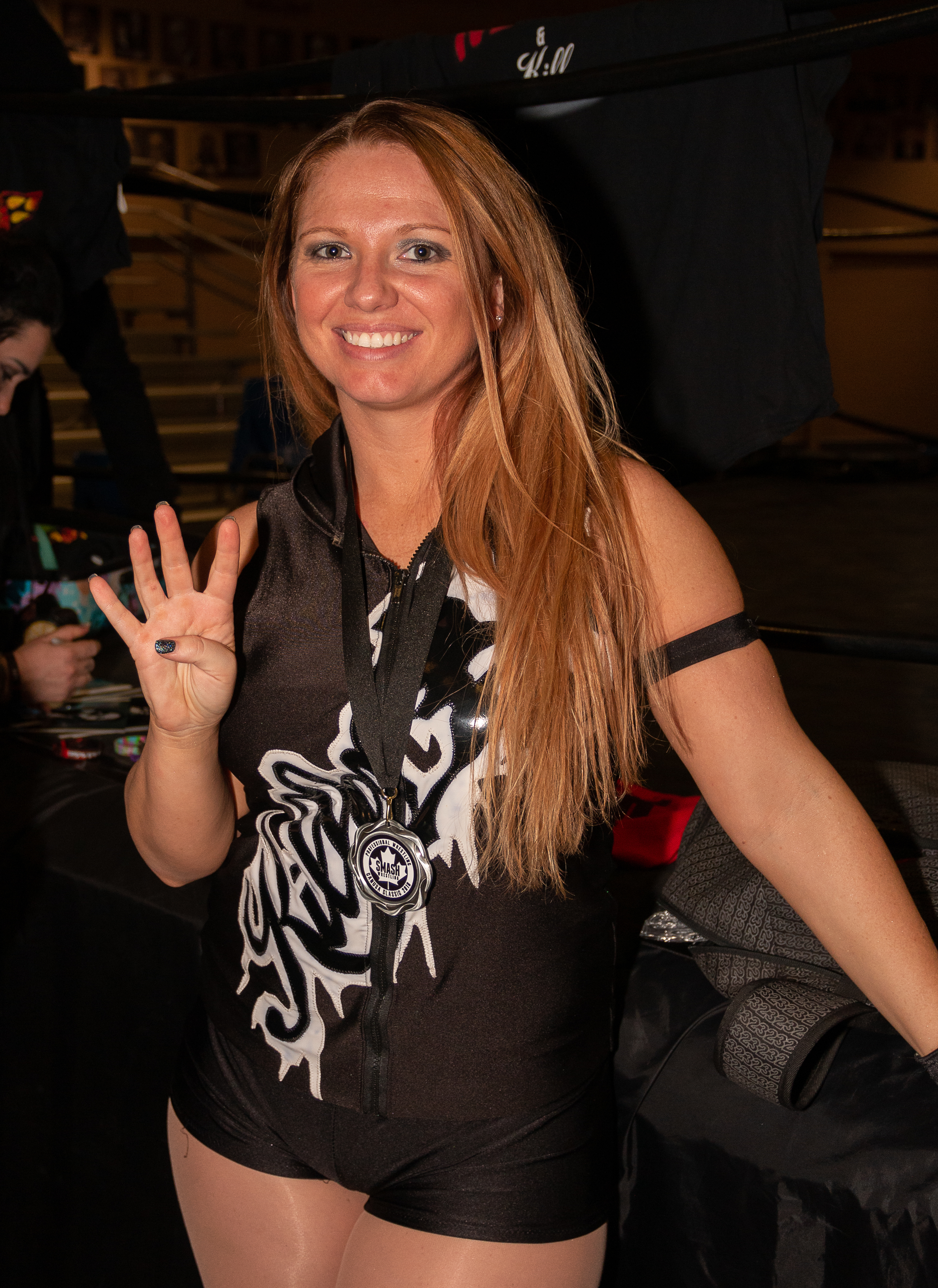
- Nevaeh in 2018

Personal information
- Born: Beth Vocke; January 29, 1986 (age 40) New Carlisle, Ohio, U.S.
- Spouse: Jake Crist (m. 2013)
- Children: 2

Professional wrestling career
- Ring name(s): Hazard; Kickstart Katie; Nevaeh
- Billed height: 5 ft 4 in (1.63 m)
- Billed weight: 135 lb (61 kg)
- Billed from: Carlisle, Ohio; Dayton, Ohio
- Trained by: Heartland Wrestling Association
- Debut: 2004

Beth Crist (née Vocke; born January 29, 1986) is an American professional wrestler, better known by the ring name Nevaeh. She is best known for her time in Impact Wrestling as well as Women of Wrestling (WOW) under the name Hazard. Nevaeh also performing on the independent circuit, most notably for Combat Zone Wrestling.

She competed in the former Women Superstars Uncensored, where she was a WSU Spirit Champion, and in the former Shimmer Women Athletes, where she and Madison Rayne (as Ashley Lane) were the promotion's inaugural Tag Team Champions, and she was the promotion's final Heart of Shimmer Champion, winning the belt the night before Shimmer folded operations in 2021. She has also competed with Shine Wrestling, and is a former American Luchacore Champ for Rockstar Pro Wrestling in her hometown of Dayton, Ohio.

== Professional wrestling career ==
=== Early career (2004–2008) ===
In 2004, Nevaeh wrestled regularly for the Heartland Wrestling Association, facing wrestlers including Hellena Heavenly and Heather Owens. She also made several appearances for Mad-Pro Wrestling, where she managed Matt Stryker. On June 3, 2007, she debuted for Cleveland All-Pro Wrestling, losing to Jessicka Havok, and three months later returned to team with her real-life husband Jake Crist to defeat Lexi Lane and Robbie Starr. The following month, Neaveh debuted for Ohio Championship Wrestling (OCW), where she won the OCW Women's Championship from Lexi Lane. The duo then formed a regular tag team, and also travelled to Insanity Pro Wrestling (IPW), taking on teams including Sassy Stephie and Angel Dust and Paige Adams and Elektra Fine.

=== Shimmer Women Athletes (2008–2011, 2013–present) ===
On April 26, 2008, Nevaeh made her debut for Shimmer Women Athletes at the Volume 17 tapings, where she and Ashley Lane (the renamed Lexi Lane) lost to The Experience (Lexie Fyfe and Malia Hosaka). They rebounded at the tapings for Volume 18, defeating the Minnesota Home Wrecking Crew (Lacey and Rain). On July 5, they beat the duo of Veronika Vice and Cat Power before losing to The International Home Wrecking Crew (Rain and Jetta) at the Volume 19 and Volume 20 tapings respectively.

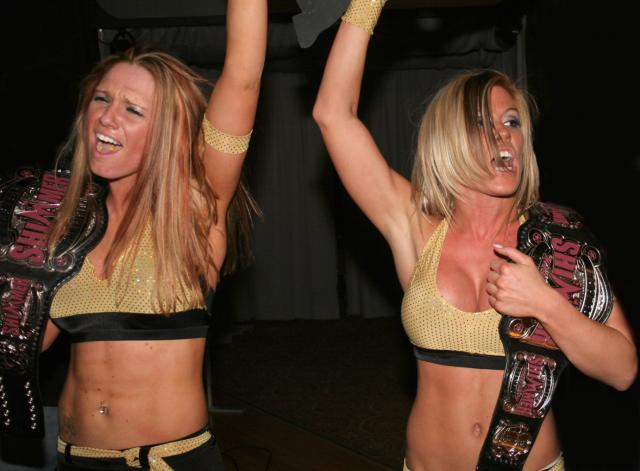
Nevaeh (left) with her partner Ashley Lane as the Shimmer Tag Team Champions

On October 19, 2008, Nevaeh and Lane participated in a six-team gauntlet match to determine Shimmer's inaugural Tag Team Champions; they won the match and the title by last eliminating The Experience. At the Volume 22 tapings, they successfully defended the title against the Canadian NINJAs (Portia Perez and Nicole Matthews). On November 1, the Tag Team title was defended outside Shimmer for the first time as Nevaeh and Lane retained their championship against Stephie Sinclair and Hellena Heavenly in a match for IPW; they later defended it against Hailey Hatred and Mary Elizabeth Monroe at HWA's High Def event as well. On May 2, 2009, Nevaeh and Lane retained their title against The International Home Wrecking Crew in a two out of three falls match, and the following day successfully defended the title against Sara Del Rey and Amazing Kong. They lost the championship to the Canadian NINJAs at the Volume 26 tapings, ending their reign at 196 days. After losing the title, Nevaeh and Lane lost again, this time to Wesna Busic and Melanie Cruise on November 8. However, they rebounded with a victory over Kacey Diamond and Sassy Stephie later on in the night.

Beginning in 2010, Nevaeh moved into singles competition, facing wrestlers including Kellie Skater, Cat Power, and Sassy Stephie. After losing to Sara Del Rey and Daffney, she rebounded with a victory against Athena at Volume 36. On October 1, 2011, Nevaeh defeated her former tag team partner Ashley Lane in the latter's return to Shimmer before forming a new partnership with Sassy Stephie. At Volume 42, they defeated Ariel and Nikki Roxx, but lost to Regeneration X (Allison Danger and Leva Bates) the next night. On October 2, Nevaeh and Stephie defeated Lane and Mia Yim.

After a year-long absence, Nevaeh returned to Shimmer on April 6, 2013; she reunited with Sassy Stephie and aligned with Jessicka Havok to face Regeneration X (Allison Danger and Leva Bates) and Serena Deeb in a six-woman tag team match, with Nevaeh's team losing after she was pinned by Deeb. At Shimmer's Volume 59, Nevaeh and Stephie defeated Savannah Summers and Santana Garrett, and then unsuccessfully challenged Kellie Skater and Tomoka Nakagawa for the Shimmer Tag Team Championship at Volume 60 on October 20. She returned to singles competition the following year, facing off against wrestlers including Christina Von Eerie, LuFisto, Kay Lee Ray, and Kimber Lee.

=== Combat Zone Wrestling (2012–present) ===
On February 4, 2012, Nevaeh made her Combat Zone Wrestling debut with a victory over Kimber Lee. Following the match, her signing was confirmed when she was added to the Bombshells section on CZW's website and she soon joined Jake Crist, Dave Crist, and Sami Callihan to form Ohio Is For Killers (OI4K). In addition to assuming a managerial role within the stable, Nevaeh continued to perform as a wrestler, as she defeated Cherry Bomb on October 13, 2012, and wrestled Jessicka Havok to a no contest on March 9, 2013. In a rematch, Nevaeh defeated Havok at Proving Grounds in May 2013. Over the next year, she faced wrestlers including Christina Von Eerie, Kimber Lee, and Shanna, while becoming involved in OI4K's feud with D. J. Hyde and The Front, and was part of a six-person tag team match at Cage of Death XV in December, in which she pinned Hyde. In May 2014, she teamed with Jessicka Havok to defeat Kimber Lee and LuFisto, and later defeated Lee in a singles match in September at Deja Vu.

=== Other promotions (2009–2020) ===
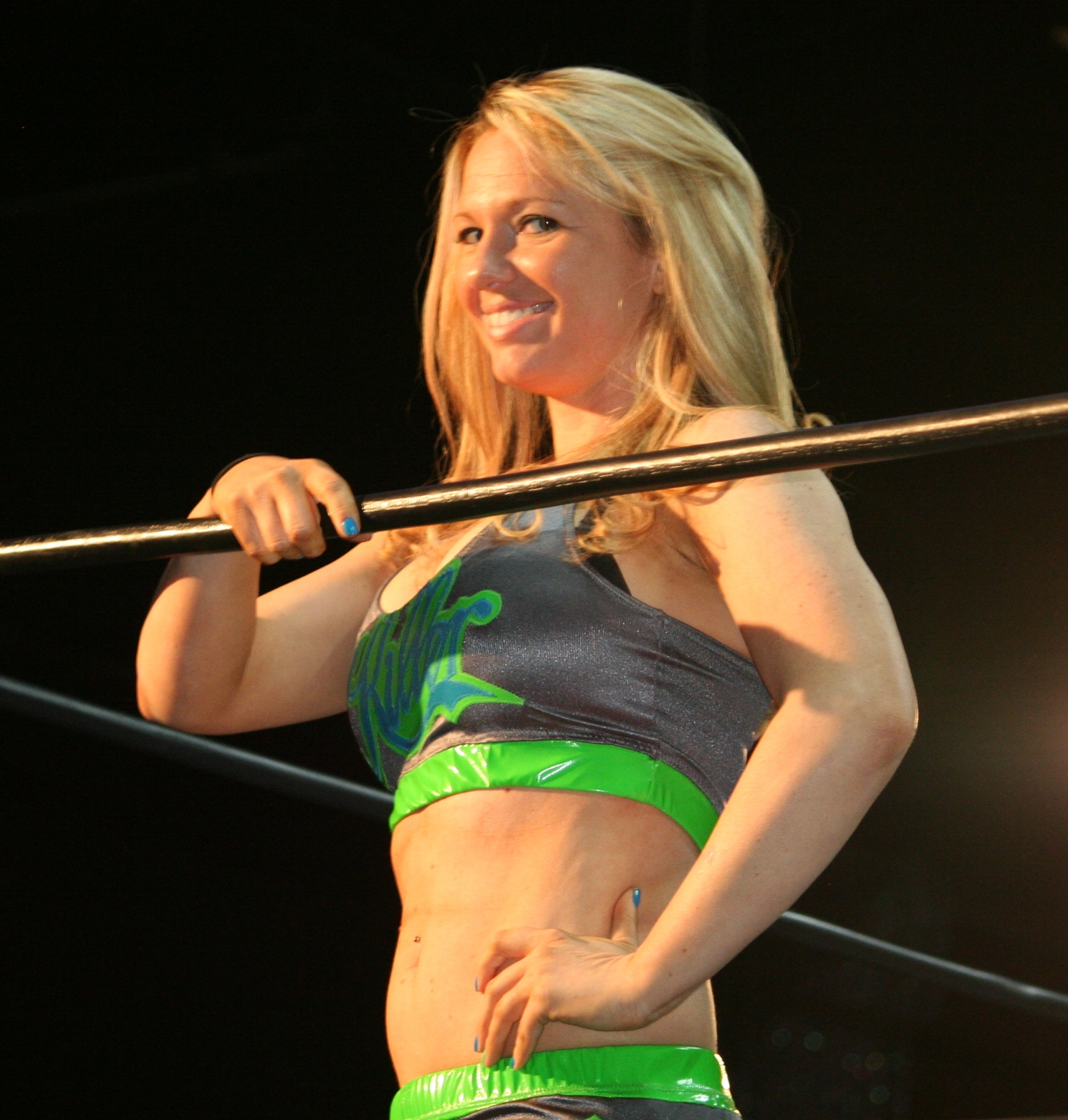
Neveah at a Queens of Combat show in March 2014

Nevaeh continued to work for OCW in 2009 and 2010, and IPW until 2012. She also appeared in Clash Wrestling and Remix Pro Wrestling during this time. In 2010, she debuted for All-American Wrestling, and on the May 26, 2010, episode of Wrestlicious' show TakeDown, Nevaeh made her debut for the promotion under the ring name Kickstart Katie. She wrestled at the Queens of Combat inaugural show in 2014.

Nevaeh made her Ring of Honor (ROH), debut on March 1, 2009, as she and Daizee Haze defeated Sara Del Rey and Sassy Stephie in a tag team match on the fourth episode of Ring of Honor Wrestling. On May 29, she lost to Shimmer Champion MsChif in a non-title match. The next day, she and Haze lost to MsChif and Del Rey. After a hiatus from ROH, Nevaeh returned to the promotion on October 16, 2010, at Richards vs. Daniels and teamed with Lady JoJo to defeat Daizee Haze and Jamilia Craft.

Neveah debuted for Women Superstars Uncensored on February 9, 2013, defeating Jessie Brooks. As part of the WSU Queen and King of the Ring tournament in May 2013, Neveah and Jake Crist defeated Cherry Bomb and Pepper Parks, before losing to Kimber Lee and Drew Gulak in the semi-finals. In August, Neveah lost to Alexxis Nevaeh in a match to determine the number one contender to the WSU Championship. In February 2014, Nevaeh and Christina Von Eerie unsuccessfully challenged Annie Social and Kimber Lee for the WSU Tag Team Championship. On February 21, 2015, Nevaeh won the WSU Spirit Championship by defeating Niya Barela.

On September 27, 2013, Nevaeh made her debut for Shine Wrestling, where she defeated Leva Bates in a singles match. Following the match, Nevaeh was assisted by the S-N-S Express (Jessie Belle and Sassy Stephie) in attacking Bates. She continued to feud with Bates over the next few shows, including a loss in a hardcore match at Shine 15, before defeating her at Shine 16 to end the storyline. At Shine 21, she won a four-way match against Amazing Kong, Su Yung, and Leah Von Dutch. Neveah later formed a new alliance, known as Valifornia, with SoCal Val, Marti Belle, and Jayme Jameson. At Shine 23 in December 2014, she challenged Mia Yim for the Shine Championship but lost by disqualification.

=== Women of Wrestling (2019–present) ===
On the September 7 episode of Women of Wrestling (WOW), during the main event between The Beast, Jessicka Havok and Jungle Grrrl in a three-way elimination match to determine the #1 contender for the WOW World Championship, Nevaeh made her debut under the name Hazard by interfering the match in favor of Havok, establishing themselves as a villainous team in the process. The team competed in the WOW World Tag Team Championship tournament and made it through the finales where they lost to Adrenaline and Fire.

=== Impact Wrestling (2020–2021, 2023) ===
On April 28, 2020, during the second night of Rebellion, Nevaeh made her Impact Wrestling debut as she watched from distance a Full Metal Mayhem match between Havok and Rosemary, which was won by Rosemary. On the May 26 episode of Impact!, Nevaeh interfered a match between Havok and Kimber Lee, as Nevaeh stopped Lee from hitting Havok with a brass knuckles. Havok and Nevaeh continued to attack Lee afterwards, establishing themselves as a team. On June 16 episode of Impact!, Neaveh was victorious in her first match in Impact Wrestling when she defeated Lee. Nevaeh and Havok found themselves feuding with Fire N Flava (Kiera Hogan and Tasha Steelz), which led into a no disqualification match on the August 11 episode of Impact!, where Hogan and Steelz were victorious. At Hard to Kill on January 16, 2021, Havok and Nevaeh lost to Fire N Flava in a match to crown the new Impact Knockouts Tag Team Champions.

On the March 30 episode of Impact, Nevaeh attacked Havok after they lost a match to Fire N Flava, ending their alliance. This led to a match between the two on the April 15 episode of Impact, which was won by Havok. On April 16, she announced her departure from the company.

On June 9, 2023, Nevaeh would make a brief return to Impact during the Countdown to Against All Odds event. In a losing effort to KiLynn King.

== Personal life ==
In 2013, she married fellow professional wrestler Jake Crist. The couple, who were childhood sweethearts in the late 1990s while attending Tecumseh High School, have a daughter who was born when both were teenagers. Nevaeh had her second daughter on November 23, 2015.

== Championships and accomplishments ==
- Clash Wrestling
  - Clash Women's Championship (1 time)
- Heartland Wrestling Association
  - Woman of the Year (2008)
- Ohio Championship Wrestling
  - OCW Women's Championship (1 time)
- Pro Wrestling Illustrated
  - Ranked No. 32 of the top 50 female wrestlers in the PWI Female 50 in 2009
- Rise Wrestling
  - Guardians of Rise Championship (1 time, final) – with Jessicka Havok
  - Rise Year End Award (1 time)
    - Tag Team of the Year (2019) – with Jessicka Havok
- Rockstar Pro Wrestling
  - Rockstar Pro American Luchacore Championship (1 time)
  - Rockstar Pro Championship (1 time)
- Shimmer Women Athletes
  - Shimmer Tag Team Championship (1 time, inaugural) – with Ashley Lane
  - Heart of Shimmer Championship (1 time, final)
- Women Superstars Uncensored
  - WSU Spirit Championship (1 time)
