= Hard To Kill (2021) =

2021 Impact Wrestling pay-per-view event

- Promotional poster featuring various Impact wrestlers (This poster was made before Alex Shelley was withdrawn from the advertised match and replaced by Moose)
- Promotion: Impact Wrestling
- Date: January 16, 2021
- City: Nashville, Tennessee
- Venue: Skyway Studios
- Attendance: 0 (behind closed doors) (Note: The event was held without a paying audience due to the COVID-19 pandemic in the United States.)

Pay-per-view chronology
← Previous; Bound for Glory	Next → Rebellion

Hard to Kill chronology
← Previous; 2020	Next → 2022

The 2021 Hard To Kill was a professional wrestling pay-per-view (PPV) event produced by Impact Wrestling. It took place on January 16, 2021, at the Skyway Studios in Nashville, Tennessee. It is the second event under the Hard To Kill chronology.

The event crowned the reactivated Impact Knockouts Tag Team Championship's first champions since 2013, with Fire N Flava (Kiera Hogan and Tasha Steelz) defeating Havok and Nevaeh to win the titles. The main event saw the AEW World Champion Kenny Omega and the Impact World Tag Team Champions The Good Brothers (Doc Gallows and Karl Anderson) defeat the Impact World Champion Rich Swann, Chris Sabin, and Moose in a Six-man tag team match. Other notable matches saw Manik and Deonna Purrazzo retain the X Division and Knockouts Championships respectively, with Manik defeating Chris Bey and Rohit Raju in a Triple Threat match and Purrazzo defeating Taya Valkyrie. The event also saw Matt Cardona make his debut in Impact Wrestling, defeating Ace Austin by disqualification.

== Production ==
=== Background ===
On October 14, 2020, at Bound for Glory, it was announced that Hard To Kill would take place on January 16, 2021.

=== Storylines ===
Other on-screen personnel
Commentator	Matt Striker
Commentator	D'Lo Brown
Ring announcer	David Penzer
Referee	Brian Hebner
Referee	Brandon Tolle
Referee	Daniel Spencer
Interviewer	Gia Miller
Pre-show panel	Jon Burton
Pre-show panel	Madison Rayne
Pre-show panel	Scott D'Amore

The event featured ten professional wrestling matches that involves different wrestlers from pre-existing scripted feuds and storylines. Wrestlers portrayed villains, heroes, or less distinguishable characters in scripted events that build tension and culminate in a wrestling match or series of matches.

At Bound for Glory, Impact wrestler and commentator, Madison Rayne, announced that after months of speculation, Impact will be reviving the Impact Knockouts Tag Team Championship, which was last used by the company in 2013, with the new champions being determined by an eight-team tournament which began on the November 17, 2020 episode of Impact! with the final taking place at Hard to Kill. On the same episode, in the first match of the tournament, Havok and Nevaeh defeated Tenille Dashwood and Alisha to advance to the next round. On the November 24 episode of Impact!, Kiera Hogan and Tasha Steelz defeated Team Sea Stars (Ashley Vox and Delmi Exo) to advance to the next round. On the following episode, Jordynne Grace and Jazz defeated Killer Kelly and Renee Michelle to advance. On the December 8 episode of Impact!, Taya Valkyrie and Rosemary defeated Deonna Purrazzo and Kimber Lee to advance. On the following episode, Tasha Steelz and Kiera Hogan defeated Taya and Rosemary to advance to the finals. On January 5, Havok and Nevaeh defeated Jazz and Jordynne Grace to move on to Hard To Kill

At All Elite Wrestling's "Winter Is Coming", a special episode of AEW Dynamite that aired on December 2, Kenny Omega defeated Jon Moxley to win the AEW World Championship for the first time, following assistance from Impact Co-Executive Vice President and color commentator Don Callis, who was working as a special guest commentator during the match. After the match, Omega and Callis fled to a car with Callis stating Omega will appear on the December 8 episode of Impact! to explain what happened. During that episode, Omega and Callis explained the partnership between the two of them during an interview with Impact commentator Josh Mathews, with Callis saying that this partnership had been in the works for almost ten years and Omega dubbing himself as "The Collector". At Final Resolution, Omega and Callis appeared alongside Omega's former Bullet Club stablemate and one half of the current Impact World Tag Team Champions, Karl Anderson, in which Omega urged Anderson to revert to "the real Machine Gun", in reference to Anderson's days in Bullet Club alongside Omega. On the next edition of Impact!, after Anderson defeated Chris Sabin in the main event, the Impact World Champion, Rich Swann, confronted Anderson backstage only for Anderson to attack Swann. Anderson was then attacked himself by Sabin and Alex Shelley, which resulted in Anderson's tag team partner and fellow Impact World Tag Team Champion Doc Gallows attacking Sabin and Shelley. Swann then superkicked Gallows, but was then attacked with a hazard sign by Omega. Following the incident, Omega and Callis announced that Omega would team up with Gallows and Anderson to face Swann, Sabin and Shelley in a six-man tag team match at Hard To Kill. However, on January 15, 2020, Impact announced that Shelley had been withdrawn from the match due to "unavoidable circumstances" (later, Shelley revealed he could not work for Impact since he was working also as a physical therapy clinician and the company was more restrictive in its COVID-19 safety mandates) and would be replaced by Moose, who had been engaged in a feud with Swann and Willie Mack for the prior few weeks.

At Final Resolution, Manik, who is really TJP in disguise, returned to Impact Wrestling and answered Rohit Raju's Impact X Division Championship 'Defeat Rohit' challenge; resulting in Manik winning the title. TJP had to wear the mask after he lost their previous title match, which stipulated that TJP could never challenge for the title so long as Raju held it. On the following edition of Impact, Chris Bey agreed to a non-title match with Manik, believing that unmasking him would give Rohit the title back. However, Raju accidentally got Bey disqualified when he struck Manik in full view of the official. Raju still had a rematch clause, however, which he would invoke at Hard To Kill, but on the December 21 Impact, Bey was able to "finesse" his way into the match, making the championship bout into a three-way match.

On the December 8 episode of Impact!, Rosemary and Taya Valkyrie eliminated Impact Knockouts Champion Deonna Purrazzo and Kimber Lee in the first round of the Impact Knockouts Tag Team Championship tournament, with Rosemary pinning Lee. At Final Resolution the following Saturday, Purrazzo would successfully defend her championship against Rosemary. On the Impact! after Final Resolution, Rosemary and Valkyrie would be eliminated from the tag title tournament by Kiera Hogan and Tasha Steelz, after Purrazzo and Lee neutralized Rosemary from the match away from the referee's view. On part one of The Best of Impact in 2020, Valkyrie congratulated Purrazzo on her Impact rookie year, but claimed it was because the two rarely crossed paths in singles competition. She later challenged Purrazzo to a Knockouts Championship match at Hard To Kill, a challenge Purrazzo and Lee accepted the next week, and the match was made official.

== Results ==
No.	Results	Stipulations	Times
1^{P}	Brian Myers defeated Josh Alexander by pinfall	Singles match	10:55
2	Decay (Rosemary and Crazzy Steve) defeated Tenille Dashwood and Kaleb with a K by pinfall	Intergender tag team match	8:55
3	Violent By Design (Eric Young, Deaner, and Joe Doering) defeated Cousin Jake, Rhino, and Tommy Dreamer by pinfall	Old School Rules six-man tag team match	9:55
4	Fire 'N Flava (Kiera Hogan and Tasha Steelz) defeated Havok and Nevaeh by pinfall	Tournament final Tag team match for the revived Impact Knockouts Tag Team Championship	8:40
5	Matt Cardona defeated Ace Austin (with Madman Fulton) by disqualification	Singles match	2:30
6	Manik (c) defeated Chris Bey and Rohit Raju by pinfall	Triple threat match for the Impact X Division Championship	13:50
7	Deonna Purrazzo (c) defeated Taya Valkyrie by submission	Singles match for the Impact Knockouts Championship	11:40
8	The Karate Man defeated Ethan Page	Singles match	—
9	Eddie Edwards defeated Sami Callihan by pinfall	Barbed Wire Massacre	18:50
10	Kenny Omega and The Good Brothers (Doc Gallows and Karl Anderson) (with Don Callis) defeated Rich Swann, Chris Sabin, and Moose by pinfall	Six-man tag team match	20:30
(c) / – the champion(s) heading into the match; P / – the match was broadcast on the pre-show

=== Impact Knockouts Tag Team Championship tournament bracket ===
Quarterfinals; Impact! (November 17 & 24, December 1 & 8, 2020)
Alisha and Tenille Dashwood	06:32
Havok and Nevaeh	Pin
Killer Kelly and Renee Michelle	08:54
Jordynne Grace and Jazz	Pin
Kiera Hogan and Tasha Steelz	Pin
Team Sea Stars (Ashley Vox and Delmi Exo)	07:10
Deonna Purrazzo and Kimber Lee	06:59
Rosemary and Taya Valkyrie	Pin

Semifinals; Impact! (December 15, 2020 & January 5, 2021)
Havok and Nevaeh	Pin
Jordynne Grace and Jazz	09:49
Kiera Hogan and Tasha Steelz	Pin
Rosemary and Taya Valkyrie	07:58

Final; Hard To Kill (January 16, 2021)
Havok and Nevaeh	08:40
Kiera Hogan and Tasha Steelz	Pin
