= Final Resolution (2020) =

- Promotional poster
- Promotion: Impact Wrestling
- Date: December 12, 2020
- City: Nashville, Tennessee
- Venue: Skyway Studios
- Attendance: 0 (behind closed doors) (Note: The event was held without a paying audience due to the COVID-19 pandemic in the United States.)

Impact Plus Monthly Specials chronology
← Previous; Turning Point	Next → Genesis

Final Resolution chronology
← Previous; 2013	Next → 2023

The 2020 Final Resolution was a professional wrestling event produced by Impact Wrestling. It took place on December 12, 2020 at Skyway Studios in Nashville, Tennessee and aired exclusively on Impact Plus. It was the 11th event under the Final Resolution chronology, the first to be held since the 2013 event, and the first purchase-only event since the 2012 event.

Nine matches were contested at the event. In the main event, Rich Swann successfully defended the Impact World Championship against Chris Bey. In other prominent matches, Deonna Purrazzo defeated Rosemary to retain the Impact Knockouts Championship and Manik defeated Rohit Raju to win the Impact X Division Championship.

== Production ==
=== Background ===
In 2013, Impact Wrestling (then known as Total Nonstop Action Wrestling) discontinued monthly pay-per-view events in favor of the pre-recorded One Night Only events. Final Resolution was produced as a PPV from 2005 to 2012. On November 14, 2020, it was revived as a monthly special for Impact Plus, with that year's event taking place on December 12 at the Skyway Studios in Nashville, Tennessee.

=== Storylines ===
The event featured professional wrestling matches that involve different wrestlers from pre-existing scripted feuds and storylines. Wrestlers portrayed villains, heroes, or less distinguishable characters in scripted events that build tension and culminate in a wrestling match or series of matches.

On the December 1 episode of Impact!, Willie Mack defeated Chris Bey in a singles match. Following the match, Moose, who previously defeated Mack in a No Disqualification match on the November 17 episode, attacked Mack, prompting Mack's ally, the Impact World Champion Rich Swann to make the save. Bey then performed the Art of Finesse on Swann following Moose's attack. After the incident, Impact announced that Swann will defend his title against Bey at Final Resolution.

At Turning Point, The Good Brothers (Doc Gallows and Karl Anderson) defeated The North (Ethan Page and Josh Alexander) to win the Impact World Tag Team Championship. On the November 24 episode of Impact!, Page revealed that he attacked and injured Gallows, ruling him out of action for 4–5 weeks. Later on the episode, Page faced a "phenomenal opponent" chosen by Anderson, which was revealed to be Swoggle dressed as former Impact star and current WWE star AJ Styles, with Swoggle calling himself "The wee-nominal one, AJ Swoggle". Swoggle then defeated Page, leaving Page upset in the middle of the ring. This led to Page challenging Anderson to a match at Final Resolution on the following episode, where if Page won, The North would receive an opportunity to challenge for the tag team titles.

At Turning Point, Deonna Purrazzo defeated Su Yung in a no disqualification match to win the Impact Knockouts Championship for a second time. On the December 8 episode of Impact!, she teamed with Kimber Lee to compete in the Knockouts Tag Team Championship Tournament for the revived titles, but were eliminated in the first round by Rosemary and Taya Valkyrie. Later that night, Purrazzo complained to Impact Executive Vice President Scott D'Amore that she's being overworked, which he doesn't buy and tells her that she will be defending the Knockouts title against Rosemary at Final Resolution.

On the November 10 episode of Impact!, X Division Champion Rohit Raju defeated TJP to retain the title, with the stipulation that TJP could no longer challenge for the X Division Championship, as long as Raju was the champion. On the November 24 episode of Impact!, Raju issued his Defeat Rohit Challenge which was answered by Suicide, but he later made it a non-title match. During the match, he unmasked him thinking it was TJP, but the latter appeared and confused Raju, who was pinned by Crazzy Steve who was under the Suicide guise. The following week, Raju would defeat Steve to successfully retain his title. On the December 8 episode of Impact!, Raju ridiculed TJP for losing his match against Brian Myers, and announced that the final Defeat Rohit Challenge of 2020 will take place at Final Resolution.

On the October 6 episode of Impact!, Fallah Bahh stole Hernandez's wad of cash in order to pay for John E. Bravo's wedding. At Bound for Glory, both men were in the Call Your Shot Gauntlet match, with Bahh throwing the cash outside and eliminating himself to retrieve it after Hernandez attempted to get it back. On the November 10 episode of Impact!, Kiera Hogan and Tasha Steelz defended Bahh after being confronted by Hernandez, but ended up distracting Bahh to take the wad of cash for themselves. On December 8, after being confronted by both men, Hogan and Steelz announced a match where the winner will be the sole owner of the money. It was also added that Hogan and Steelz will be the special referee and ring announcer respectively.

On the October 27 episode of Impact!, a wedding took place between John E. Bravo and Rosemary but the lights went out and a gunshot was heard, ending with the lights going back on and Bravo lying down with a gunshot wound and blood on his chest. In early November, Tommy Dreamer conducted an investigation that narrow down the shooter to 10 suspects, all of them passing a lie detector test. A Wrestler's Court took place on the November 24 episode of Impact!, where Larry D's alter-ego "Lawrence D" confessed to shooting Bravo because he took Rosemary away from him. The following week, Larry D was confronted by Bravo for shooting him, with Dreamer wanting an explanation for his actions but gets attacked instead. On the December 8 episode of Impact!, he was challenged by Dreamer to a match at Final Resolution, where if Larry D won, he's a free man. But if Dreamer won, he has to go to jail for shooting Bravo.

== Event ==
Other on-screen personnel
Commentators	Josh Mathews
Commentators	Madison Rayne
Ring announcers	David Penzer
Ring announcers	Tasha Steelz (Hernandez vs. Fallah Bahh)
Referees	Brandon Tolle
Referees	Daniel Spencer
Referees	Kiera Hogan (Hernandez vs. Fallah Bahh)
Interviewer	Gia Miller

=== Preliminary matches ===
The opening match of the event saw Tommy Dreamer versus Larry D in an Old School Rules match, where if Larry D loses, he must go to jail for the attempted murder of John E. Bravo. The two lockup and shove each other before Larry D knocks Dreamer out with a punch and a back elbow. Outside the ring, Dreamer hits Larry D with a baking sheet to the head, and sends him into the ring steps. Larry D sends Dreamer face-first into the ring post, dumps a cardboard box on him, but accidentally punches a trash can lid instead of Dreamer. Back in the ring, Larry D regains control by hitting Dreamer with a baking sheet for two, uses a chain to wrap around his neck but he breaks free to bite Larry D, who retakes the advantage by uppercutting Dreamer from the corner. After setting up a chair in between the middle and top rope, Larry D uses his weight belt to whip Dreamer followed by a body slam, but misses the elbow drop. Dreamer gets the boot up in the corner and uses Larry D's weight belt on him, before wrapping it around his arm and landing an elbow drop for two. Dreamer hits a cutter on Larry D for a near fall, gets tripped on a chair for another near fall, but catches Larry D on the top rope and puts him in the Tree of Woe, before putting a chair across his face to hit a running dropkick. Dreamer brings a table into the ring, but Acey Romero attacks him from behind, and XXXL set up the table in a corner. John E. Bravo arrives to land a double clothesline that doesn't budge on either of them, gets squashed but manages to avoid Romero who goes through the table. Larry D lands a headbutt on Bravo, but gets low blowed by Dreamer with a kendo stick, who plants him with a DDT for the win. After the match, Dreamer puts handcuffs on Larry D.

Next, a knockouts tag team match was contested between The Sea Stars (Ashley Vox and Delmi Exo) against Havok and Nevaeh. Delmi takes out Nevaeh with a hurricanrana, who in return hits her with a bulldog for a two count. Ashley tags in and hits Nevaeh with a dropkick, but causes her to fall towards her corner, tagging in Havok. After avoiding a sit-down splash, Ashley tags in Delmi, but gets taken out by Havok and Nevaeh with a backbreaker into a clothesline for two. Havok and Nevaeh utilize quick tags to continue their offense on Delmi, who gets taken out after the former kicks her from the apron into the latter who delivers a German suplex. Delmi gets the tag to Ashley, and the both of them take Havok out with a codebreaker/senton combination, but only for a near fall. Nevaeh tags in to hit Ashley with a sliding cutter to win for her team.

The third match was an intergender tag team match between Tenille Dashwood and Kaleb with a K against Alisha and Eddie Edwards. After a brief lockup, Tenille and Alisha tagged their respective partners. Eddie takes out Kaleb with an inverted atomic drop and a belly-to-belly suplex. Kaleb gets the advantage after a leg sweep to work on Eddie in the corner, gets caught with a jawbreaker but trips him into the ropes, allowing Tenille to choke him as Kaleb distracts the referee. Eddie fights back with a "Blue Thunder Bomb" on Kaleb, both of them tag out, and Alisha takes Tenille out with a low flatliner, a running senton and a bulldog from the corner. Kaleb breaks up the cover and gets sent to the outside, but manages to trip up Alisha and allow Tenille to land a butterfly suplex for two. Alisha heads to the top rope but gets caught in the Tree of Woe because of Kaleb, leaving her open for Tenille to wrench her neck to the bottom turnbuckle and deliver a low crossbody, but manages to kick out at two. Alisha tags in Eddie who gives Kaleb a back body drop, sets him up for the tiger driver but Tenille stops him, and Alisha tags in to land a tilt-a-whirl DDT on Kaleb, who then gets hit with a suicide dive by Eddie. As Alisha climbs up top, Sami Callihan's music plays but he doesn't appear, leaving her distracted for Tenille to hit the "Spotlight Kick" and get the win. After the match, Callihan emerges from underneath the ring and hits Eddie's head with a baseball bat, followed by a package piledriver. Callihan attempted to piledrive Alisha, but was stopped by several referees and officials from doing it.

The fourth match involved Hernandez against Fallah Bahh, where the winner will receive the wad of cash. Kiera Hogan and Tasha Steelz were the special guest referee and ring announcer respectively. Both men run into each other and deliver a chop to their chest in the corner, with Bahh hitting a running crossbody and a twisting elbow drop for two. Bahh attempts to charge into Hernandez, who pulls Hogan in front of him, and gets thrown onto the apron before hitting a slingshot shoulder block on Bahh. Hernandez dropkicks Bahh out of the ring and hits a dive to the outside, sending him back inside the ring for a two count. Hernandez wrenches Bahh's head and neck, before hitting a corner splash and a running senton for two. Bahh fights back with a clothesline, squashes Hernandez in the corner, and hits a running hip attack afterwards. Hernandez gets out of a Samoan drop attempt but gets hit with a sit-down splash by Bahh, who only gets a slow two count. Bahh argues with Hogan over the count, meets with Hernandez on the top rope and gets knocked down to the mat, and Hernandez hits a diving splash for the win. After the match, Steelz opens her fanny pack but doesn't find the money, resulting in Hernandez pulling out a straight razor that sends her and Hogan to the back.

The fifth match was Eric Young (with Joe Doering) versus Rhino. Rhino immediately gets some shots on Young when the bell rings, forcing him to go outside with Doering. Back in the ring, Rhino hits Young with a shoulder block, sends his face into the top turnbuckle, and throws him off the top rope. On the outside, Rhino slams Young face-first into the apron before rolling him back in the ring, but gets distracted by Doering and allows Young to hit a drop off the apron. Young lays some forearm shots to Rhino's chest, rolls him back in the ring for a two count. Rhino comes back with a back body drop on Young, but Doering distracts him again to allow Young to hit a neckbreaker on Rhino, followed by some punches and a choke on the middle rope. Doering gets a cheap shot on Rhino behind the referee's back, with Young covering him for two, and delivers some stomps on the mat. Young misses the moonsault and Rhino fights back with a back elbow, a belly-to-belly suplex and some clotheslines. Young lands some elbow shots on Rhino, but gets dropped with a TKO for a two count. Rhino whips Young to the corner, who inadvertently knocks out the referee, takes out Doering but Young lands a superkick on Rhino. As Young grabs his mask from the ring post, The Deaners (Cody Deaner and Cousin Jake) arrive and stop him. Cody takes the mask from Young and yells "I'm not a nobody," before clocking Jake in the head and leaving the ring. Young smashes his mask into Rhino's face, Doering revives the referee, and Young gets the cover for the win.

Next, X-Division Champion Rohit Raju entered the ring to begin the final Defeat Rohit Challenge of 2020 with his title on the line. Manik's music plays as Raju looks at the stage, and Manik appears on the top rope to hit a diving crossbody on Raju before the bell rings. Josh Mathews notes that TJP was ineligible to answer Raju's challenge after previously losing to him, but the rules didn't apply to his alter ego. After hitting a corkscrew crossbody from the outside, Manik gets hit with a back elbow and a boot to the face by Raju in the ring. Manik fights back with an octopus stretch on Raju before turning it into a modified crucifix pin for two, Raju sends Manik to the outside and Manik disappears underneath the ring. Manik appears from behind to hit Raju with a neckbreaker for two, Raju misses the running big boot and gets caught in the ropes, but manages to pull the referee in front to catch Manik with a draping sitout facebuster for two. Raju misses a kick on Manik, but manages to hit a back suplex for a two count, followed by a side Russian legsweep for a delayed two count. Manik catches Raju with a back slide for two, hits the "Detonation Kick", and a springboard DDT for a near fall. Manik heads up top and rolls through with a swanton, but Raju catches him with a flurry of running strikes and a rolling senton in the corner, and goes to the top rope to land a diving stomp for a near fall. Raju hits a flatliner for another near fall, applies the crossface on Manik who escapes and applies another octopus stretch on Raju, who manages to grab the top rope. Both men exchange strikes before Raju counters a standing switch to send Manik into the referee, who almost gets kicked by Raju and Manik rolls him up to win the match and the title.

The seventh match saw Deonna Purrazzo (with Kimber Lee) defend the Impact Knockouts Championship against Rosemary (with Taya Valkyrie). Purrazzo goes outside to console with Lee, but immediately gets hit with a spear once she enters the ring. Rosemary dominates Purrazzo by throwing her across the ring and slamming her head on the mat and turnbuckles for a two count. Purrazzo throws Rosemary to the outside, sends her arm to the post, and continues to target it once back in the ring. Purrazzo attempts to apply the Fujiwara armbar but Rosemary dumps her outside the ring, and then hits the Scorpion Death Drop once she enters the ring for two. After applying the "Upside Down", Rosemary gets knocked off the apron onto the floor by Purrazzo, who hits her with a clothesline in the ring for a two count. Purrazzo applies a rear chin lock and then a modified triangle on Rosemary, who gets out of both holds and gives the former a sidewalk slam. The two trade blows with each other, before Rosemary hits a few clotheslines, a sling blade and an exploder suplex on Purrazzo, but only gets a two. After hitting a butterfly suplex for another two count, Rosemary gets caught in the Fujiwara armbar by Purrazzo, but manages to rise to her feet and deliver the "Red Wedding" for a near fall. Purrazzo gets the pump kick on Rosemary and hits the "Cosa Nostra" to win and retain her title.

In the penultimate match, Ethan Page (with Josh Alexander) fought against Karl Anderson, where if Page won, The North would get a future Impact World Tag Team Championship match. Anderson muscles Page to the corner, slams his head into the top turnbuckle, and hits a back elbow. Page lands a forearm strike but Anderson regains control with another back elbow, and stomps on his face before throwing Page outside. Alexander distracts Anderson to allow Page to hit a backbreaker as he enters the ring, and sends him outside into the apron and the ring post. Back in the ring, Page applies a waist lock on Anderson, who breaks free but gets taken out with a superkick. Page applies a side headlock that Anderson escapes from, but hits a standing dropkick, a forearm shot to the back, and another backbreaker. Page drives his knee into Anderson's back, but he manages to escape and land some forearm shots, followed by a back suplex. The two begin trading shots before Anderson lands some back elbows and a running senton. After working over Page in the corner, Anderson hits a spinebuster for two, and Page lands a big kick followed by a scoop slam on Anderson for another two count. Page puts Anderson on the top turnbuckle and sends him down the mat for a two count. Anderson hits the "Gun Stun" on Page for the win. After the match, Page tells Alexander that he has a plan to make everything right, but Alexander doesn't believe him and leaves his jacket with Page in the ring.

=== Main event ===
In the main event, Rich Swann defended the Impact World Championship against Chris Bey. Both men lockup, with Bey pushing Swann into the corner, and they trade wrist locks, hammer locks and arm wringers. Both men run the ropes and perform flips before Swann lands a dropkick, followed by a snapmare, a kick to the spine and a pair of leg drops for two. Swann goes for a Rolling Thunder, but Bey gets his knees up, and hits a rolling neckbreaker for two. Bey stomps on Swann and sends him chest-first into the corner. On the outside, Bey sends Swann into the guardrails and back in the ring for two. Swann gets a sunset flip for a two count, with Bey hitting a spinning heel kick for another two count. Bey hits an enzuigiri and a diving elbow drop with Swann caught in the ropes for two. Swann hits a back elbow on Bey followed by a clothesline for two and lands a couple of shots. Swann goes to the top rope but Bey stops him and puts Swann in the Tree of Woe, allowing Bey to hit a running dropkick and apply a torture rack into a neckbreaker for two. Swann fights back with a hurricanrana off the ropes, and lands a cartwheel standing moonsault on Bey for a two count. Swann misses a cartwheel 450° splash and Bey hits a Code Red for a near fall. Both men exchance strikes and pin attempts before Bey hits a Fisherman buster for another near fall. Swann counters Bey's "Art of Finesse" before superkicking him for two, then hits a deep thrust kick followed by the "Phoenix Splash" for the win to retain his title. After the match, TNA World Heavyweight Champion Moose makes his way to the ring, and grabs the Impact World title. He hands it back to Swann and stares him down while heading back up the ramp.

== Reception ==
Scott Slimmer of 411Mania was mixed on the event, criticizing the first-half for being "extremely forgettable", but praised the other matches towards the end. He rated it a 6 and wrote that: "Final Resolution ended on a high note, but except for the main event, it was a fairly unremarkable show." Bob Kapur of Slam Wrestling felt the opening undercard had decent matches but were more suitable for TV than on a special event. He praised the second-half for delivering on the action, highlighting the Impact World Title bout for showing "a different side to both" Bey and Swann. Kapur gave the event 4 out of 5 stars and wrote that: "After a shaky start, the matches got better and better as the show went on. While there was little bad about the event (*cough* the softest hardcore match ever), much of the undercard felt just like TV matches but a little longer. Still, the big matches delivered, and the main event was one of the better and more unique performances you'll ever see from either guy."

== Aftermath ==
Three days later, on the December 15 episode of Impact!, Chris Bey agreed to a non-title match with X Division Champion Manik, believing that unmasking him would give Rohit Raju the title back. However, Raju accidentally got Bey disqualified when he struck Manik and the referee caught him. Raju invoked his rematch clause for Hard To Kill, but on the December 21 episode of Impact!, Bey was able to "finesse" his way into the match, making the X Division Championship bout into a three-way match.

On the December 15 episode of Impact!, Knockouts Champion Deonna Purrazzo and Kimber Lee distracted Rosemary away from Taya Valkyrie during a semi-final match in the Impact Knockouts Tag Team Championship tournament, allowing Kiera Hogan and Tasha Steelz to advance to the finals. The following week on The Best of Impact in 2020 part one, Valkyrie congratulated Purrazzo on her Impact rookie year, but claimed it was because the two rarely crossed paths in singles competition. She later challenged Purrazzo to a Knockouts Championship match at Hard To Kill, a challenge Purrazzo and Lee accepted the next week, and the match was made official.

On the December 15 episode of Impact!, after winning their semi-final match in the Impact Knockouts Tag Team Championship tournament, Tasha Steelz revealed to Kiera Hogan that pretending to lose Hernandez's money was not part of her plan. Johnny Swinger arrives and causes both Hogan and Steelz to leave the dressing room, allowing Swinger to take Steelz's fanny pack for his own and find the wad of cash in a hidden compartment.

On the December 15 episode of Impact!, Alisha Edwards (with Eddie Edwards) got a victory over Tenille Dashwood (with Kaleb with a K), but were then interrupted by Sami Callihan on screen, who wanted to settle his differences with Eddie and wished him a happy holiday season. The two had their match on the January 5, 2021, episode of Impact!, but they both put their hands on the referee while doing everything to hurt each other, forcing the match to end in a no contest. As Eddie is about to use a baseball bat on Callihan, the latter plays a video of the former's wife Alisha being trapped behind a fence. Eddie runs backstage to find her but gets blindsided by Ken Shamrock, and Callihan ties up Eddie in barbed wire before hitting a baseball bat shot as his wife sees it. After the show, Impact announced that Eddie and Callihan will face each other in Barbed Wire Massacre at Hard To Kill.

The Final Resolution event would not return until October 27, 2023, when Impact announced it for December 9, at the Don Kolov Arena in Toronto, Ontario, Canada. This would be the final live event under the Impact Wrestling banner, as the company would rebrand under the revived Total Nonstop Action Wrestling (TNA) name beginning in January 2024.

== Results ==
No.	Results	Stipulations	Times
1	Tommy Dreamer defeated Larry D by pinfall	Old School Rules match Since Dreamer won, Larry D was taken to jail for the attempted murder of John E. Bravo.	11:42
2	Havok and Nevaeh defeated The Sea Stars (Ashley Vox and Delmi Exo) by pinfall	Tag Team match	08:16
3	Tenille Dashwood and Kaleb with a K defeated Alisha and Eddie Edwards by pinfall	Intergender tag team match	08:52
4	Hernandez defeated Fallah Bahh by pinfall	Singles match Kiera Hogan was the special guest referee and Tasha Steelz was the special guest ring announcer and timekeeper. Since Hernandez won, he received the wad of cash that had previously been stolen from him by Bahh and subsequently stolen from Bahh by Hogan and Steelz.	06:21
5	Eric Young (with Joe Doering) defeated Rhino by pinfall	Singles match	10:36
6	Manik defeated Rohit Raju (c) by pinfall	Singles match for the Impact X Division Championship	11:21
7	Deonna Purrazzo (c) (with Kimber Lee) defeated Rosemary (with Taya Valkyrie) by pinfall	Singles match for the Impact Knockouts Championship	13:14
8	Karl Anderson defeated Ethan Page (with Josh Alexander) by pinfall	Singles match If Page had won, The North would have earned a future Impact World Tag Team Championship match.	13:17
9	Rich Swann (c) defeated Chris Bey by pinfall	Singles match for the Impact World Championship	19:59
(c) / – the champion(s) heading into the match
