= Tomoka Nakagawa =

Japanese retired professional wrestler (born 1981)

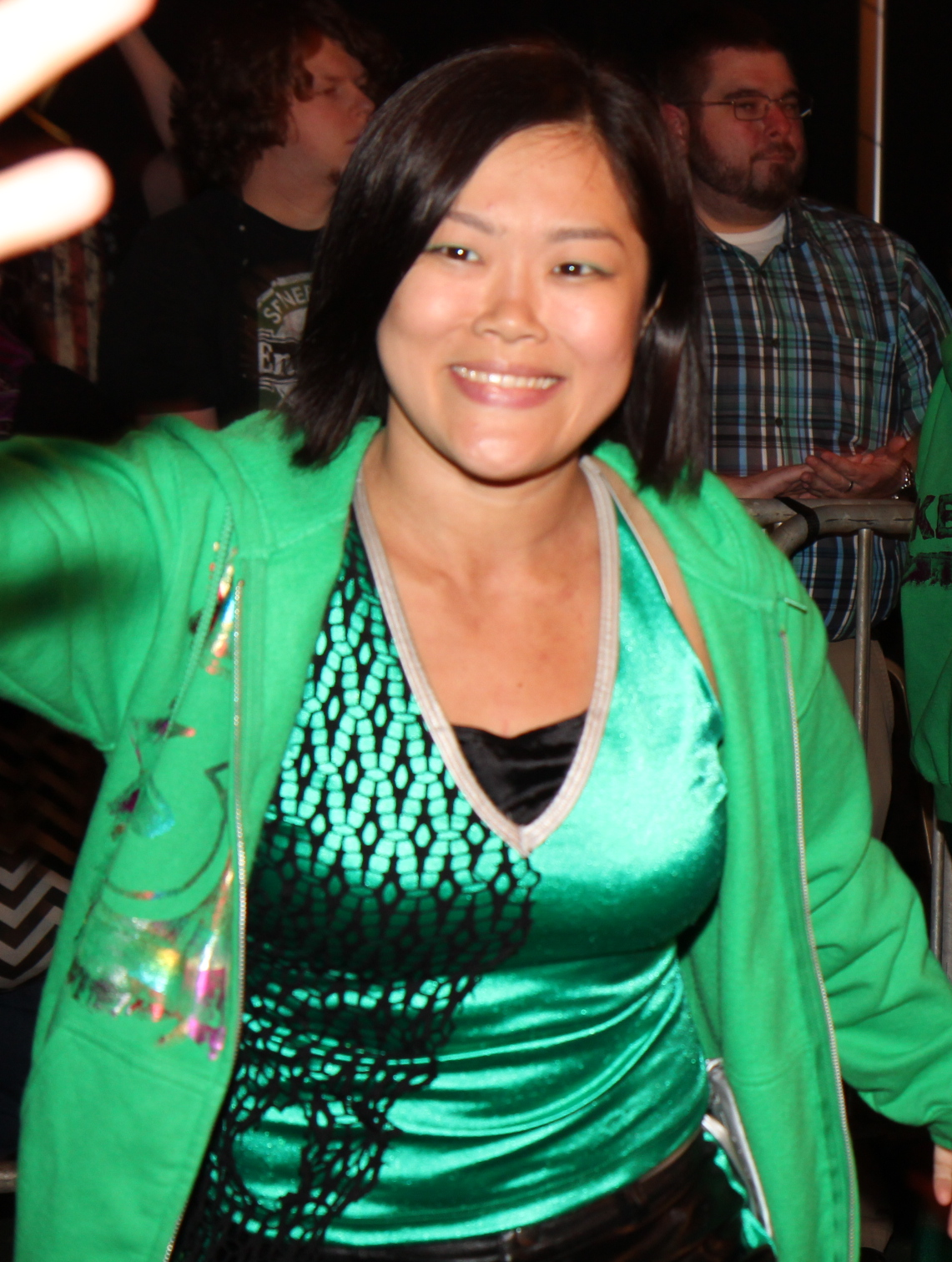
- Nakagawa in 2015

Personal information
- Born: September 29, 1981 (age 45) Asahikawa, Hokkaido, Japan

Professional wrestling career
- Ring name(s): Apple Tomotsu; Masked A Go; Tomoka Nakagawa; Tomo Michinoku; Tomotsu-chan
- Billed height: 1.55 m (5 ft 1 in)
- Billed weight: 57 kg (126 lb)
- Billed from: Asahikawa, Hokkaido
- Trained by: Taka Michinoku; Mariko Yoshida
- Debut: September 19, 2004
- Retired: April 12, 2015

Tomoka Nakagawa (中川 ともか, Nakagawa Tomoka; born September 29, 1981) is a Japanese retired professional wrestler. After being trained by Taka Michinoku, she started her career in his Kaientai Dojo promotion in September 2004. After leaving Kaientai Dojo in 2007, Nakagawa briefly joined Ibuki, where she underwent further training under Mariko Yoshida, before becoming a freelancer and starting to work on the Japanese independent circuit for promotions such as Oz Academy and Pro Wrestling Wave. She also became a regular for American promotion SHIMMER Women Athletes. Nakagawa was a decorated tag team wrestler, becoming a one-time FMW/WEW Hardcore Tag Team Champion, three-time Oz Academy Tag Team Champion, two-time SHIMMER Tag Team Champions and a three-time Wave Tag Team Champion. As a singles wrestler, she held the Smash Diva Championship. After a ten-year career, Nakagawa announced her retirement from professional wrestling in June 2014. After a Japanese retirement match in December 2014, Nakagawa wrestled her final match in the United States on April 12, 2015.

== Early life ==
Nakagawa grew up a fan of professional wrestling, watching promotions like All Japan Pro Wrestling, All Japan Women's Pro-Wrestling and New Japan Pro-Wrestling, but was forced to give up her dream of becoming a professional wrestler, when she discovered that, at 1.55 m (5 ft 1 in), she was 5 cm (2 in) below the minimum height required for a woman to enter the All Japan Women's Pro-Wrestling dojo, and instead began studying, eventually becoming a qualified nurse. While working in her new job, Nakagawa would often go to watch professional wrestling at Korakuen Hall and finally, at the age of 22, decided to pursue her original dream and began training professional wrestling under Taka Michinoku.

== Professional wrestling career ==
=== Kaientai Dojo (2004–2007) ===
Nakagawa made her professional wrestling debut for Taka Michinoku's Kaientai Dojo promotion on September 19, 2004, when she, performing under the ring name Tomotsu-chan, teamed with Ofune to defeat Besu and Bochi in a tag team match. During the rest of the year, she took part in two eight person tag team matches, working the first as Tomotsu-chan and the second as Apple Tomotsu, the name coming from one of her tag team partners, Apple Miyuki. On January 23, 2005, Nakagawa made her first appearance under her real name, wrestling in a tag team match, where she and Yuu Yamagata were defeated by Michinoku and Ryota Chikuzen. This date is listed as her official debut by not only the promotions she works for, but also by Nakagawa herself. The following year Nakagawa adopted the ring name Tomo Michinoku and aligned herself with Taka, with whom she would go on to win her first championship on June 4, 2006, when the two defeated Makoto Oishi and Shiori Asahi for the FMW/WEW Hardcore Tag Team Championship. They would hold the title for 34 days, before losing it to the team of Apple Miyuki and Yoshiya. The following December, Nakagawa dropped the Tomo Michinoku ring name and returned to wrestling under her real name. On April 15, 2007, Nakagawa announced that she was leaving Kaientai Dojo to become a freelancer on the Japanese independent circuit.

=== Independent circuit (2007–2014) ===
Shortly after her departure from Kaientai Dojo, Nakagawa joined Mariko Yoshida's Ibuki promotion, where she also underwent further training under Yoshida. The following year Nakagawa became a true freelancer, when she left Ibuki and started working for promotions such as NEO Japan Ladies Pro Wrestling, Oz Academy and Pro Wrestling Wave. Nakagawa remained affiliated with Ibuki's production company, S Ovation, through which she, Hiroyo Matsumoto and Misaki Ohata produced their own independent events under the banner of "Joshi 4 Hope".

Nakagawa made her debut for all-female promotion Oz Academy on March 9, 2008, in a tag team match, where she and Manami Toyota were defeated by Akino and Ran Yu-Yu. Shortly afterwards Nakagawa joined Mayumi Ozaki's villainous Ozaki-gun, before jumping to Aja Kong's Jungle Jack 21 stable on August 2, 2009. On April 10, 2011, Nakagawa and her Jungle Jack 21 stablemate and fellow Ibuki alum Hiroyo Matsumoto defeated Chikayo Nagashima and Sonoko Kato to win the Oz Academy Tag Team Championship. After a 77-day-long reign, the duo lost the title to Carlos Amano and Manami Toyota. The following September, the team was broken up, when Matsumoto jumped to Ozaki-gun and started a storyline rivalry with her former stablemates. In December 2012, Matsumoto returned to Jungle Jack 21, reforming her tag team with Nakagawa. On March 10, 2013, Nakagawa and Matsumoto defeated Mayumi Ozaki and Yumi Ohka to win the Oz Academy Tag Team Championship for the second time. They lost the title to Aja Kong and Hikaru Shida in their first defense on April 24. Nakagawa and Matsumoto regained the title from Kong and Shida on August 11. After holding the title for over a year, Nakagawa and Matsumoto vacated the title on August 31, 2014, after Matsumoto was sidelined with a knee injury.

In March 2008, Nakagawa, Atsuko Emoto and Kyoko Kimura formed the villainous Revolucion Amandla stable in NEO Japan Ladies Pro Wrestling. The stable feuded with NEO's top wrestlers, most notably Ayumi Kurihara, Etsuko Mita and Yoshiko Tamura, with Nakagawa and Kimura unsuccessfully challenging Kurihara and Tamura for the NEO Tag Team Championship. In October 2009, Nakagawa made her first tour of Mexico with International Wrestling Revolution Group (IWRG) as a member of Revolucion Amandla. She returned to the promotion on June 3, 2010, defeating A☆YU☆MI. This built to a match two days later at an event held by the Alianza Universal de Lucha Libre (AULL) promotion, where Nakagawa unsuccessfully challenged A☆YU☆MI for her X–LAW Women's Championship.

Nakagawa originally made her debut for Pro Wrestling Wave on September 3, 2007, but did not start working regularly for the promotion until May 2010. On April 30, 2012, Nakagawa and Gami defeated Hanako Nakamori and Misaki Ohata of the villainous Black Dahlia stable to become "interim" Wave Tag Team Champions. Following the retirement of Toshie Uematsu, one half of the previous champions, Nakagawa and Gami defeated Ayumi Kurihara and Kana on June 17 to become the official Wave Tag Team Champions. Nakagawa and Gami lost the title to Misaki Ohata and Tsukasa Fujimoto on November 27 in their third defense. Nakagawa and Gami regained the Wave Tag Team Championship from Hikaru Shida and Yumi Ohka on August 15, 2013. However, their second reign lasted only ten days, before they lost the title to Cherry and Shuu Shibutani.

On August 30, 2010, Nakagawa made her debut for Smash at Smash.7, teaming with Toshie Uematsu in a tag team match, where they were defeated by Lin Byron and Syuri. On July 15, 2011, at Smash.19, Nakagawa entered a tournament to determine the first ever Smash Diva Champion, but was eliminated in her opening round match by Serena. After the finals of the tournament on September 8 at Smash.21, Nakagawa entered the ring and, along with Makoto, Ray and Syuri, challenged the inaugural champion, Kana. On October 28 at Smash.22, Nakagawa defeated Makoto, Ray and Syuri in a four-way match, while also scoring all three eliminations, to become the number one contender to the Smash Diva Championship. On November 24 at Smash.23, Nakagawa defeated Kana to become the second Smash Diva Champion. On January 19, 2012, at We Are Smash, Nakagawa lost the title back to Kana in her first defense. On March 14, Nakagawa took part in Smash's final event, before the promotion ceased its operations, teaming with Josh O'Brien and Yoshiaki Yago in a six-person tag team match, where they defeated Hisamaru Tajima, Jiro Kuroshio and Makoto.

On May 8, 2011, Nakagawa made her debut for the World Wonder Ring Stardom promotion, defeating Eri Susa. Nakagawa made two more appearances for the promotion during the rest of the year, defeating Saki Kashima on September 10 and teaming with Kashima in a tag team match, where they were defeated by Arisa Hoshiki and Mayu Iwatani on November 12. Nakagawa returned to Stardom on March 11, 2012, when she defeated Iwatani in a singles match. On January 14, 2013, Nakagawa led "Team Shimmer", which also included Kellie Skater and Portia Perez, to the finals of the Artist of Stardom Championship tournament, where they were, however, defeated by Kawasaki Katsushika Saikyou Densetsu Plus One (Act Yasukawa, Natsuki☆Taiyo and Saki Kashima).

On May 24, 2012, Nakagawa made her debut for Wrestling New Classic (WNC), the follow-up promotion to Smash, teaming with Josh O'Brien and Yoshiaki Yago in a six-person tag team match, where they were defeated by Lin Byron, Último Dragón and Yusuke Kodama.

On August 3, 2013, Nakagawa took part in the retirement match of her longtime rival Ayumi Kurihara; a six-woman tag team match, where she, Aja Kong and Gami were defeated by Kurihara, Akino and Mika Iida.

On June 4, 2014, after unsuccessfully challenging Akino for the Oz Academy Openweight Championship, Nakagawa announced she would be retiring from professional wrestling on December 4. Following the announcement, Nakagawa reformed Revolucion Amandla with Kyoko Kimura. On October 15, the two defeated Sakuragohan (Kyusei Sakura Hirota and Mika Iida) in the finals to win the 2014 Dual Shock Wave tournament and become the new Wave Tag Team Champions. They lost the title to Las Aventureras (Ayako Hamada and Yuu Yamagata) in their first defense on October 29. On November 2, Nakagawa received one final shot at the Oz Academy Openweight Championship, but was defeated by the defending champion, Tsubasa Kuragaki. On December 4, Oz Academy produced Nakagawa's Japanese retirement event, which saw Nakagawa, Aja Kong and Akino, the reunited Jungle Jack 21 (accompanied by the retired Ran Yu-Yu and the injured Hiroyo Matsumoto), defeat Dynamite Kansai, Kyoko Kimura and Mayumi Ozaki in the main event. Nakagawa was set to wrestle another retirement match abroad.

=== SHIMMER Women Athletes (2010–2015) ===
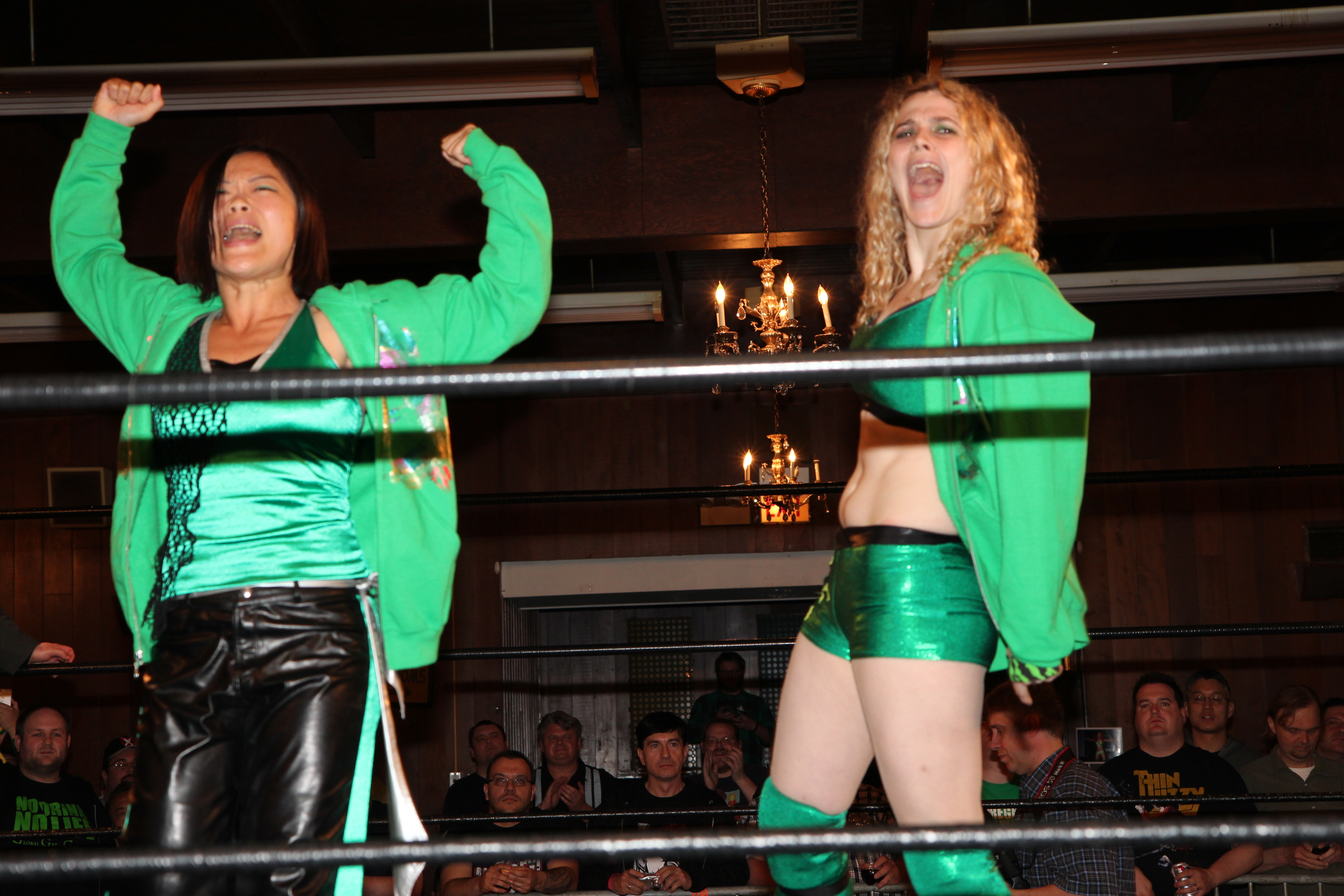
Nakagawa alongside her long-term tag team partner Kellie Skater. Together the duo were known as Global Green Gangsters.

On April 10, 2010, Nakagawa made her American debut for the SHIMMER Women Athletes promotion in a losing effort against Ayumi Kurihara on Volume 29. Later that same day on Volume 30, Nakagawa teamed with Daizee Haze to defeat the team of Jamilia Craft and Misaki Ohata. At the following day's tapings of Volumes 31 and 32, Nakagawa was defeated by Mercedes Martinez and picked up a win over Jessie McKay, respectively. Nakagawa returned to Shimmer five months later on September 11, when she was defeated by Ayako Hamada and Cheerleader Melissa at the tapings of Volumes 33 and 34. The following day on Volume 35, Nakagawa and Daizee Haze continued their tag team win streak by defeating Pretty Bitchin' (Ariel and Nikki Roxx). On March 26, 2011, Nakagawa returned for her third visit with Shimmer, losing to LuFisto on Volume 37 and defeating Jessica James on Volume 38. The following day on Volume 39, Nakagawa and Haze defeated Jamilia Craft and Mia Yim in a tag team match and were as a result granted a shot at the Shimmer Tag Team Championship. Later that same day on Volume 40, Nakagawa and Haze defeated the Seven Star Sisters (Hiroyo Matsumoto and Misaki Ohata) to become the fourth SHIMMER Tag Team Champions. Nakagawa and Haze made their first title defense on April 2 at Ring of Honor's Honor Takes Center Stage pay-per-view, defeating Ayumi Kurihara and Hiroyo Matsumoto. On October 1 at Shimmer's Volume 41, Nakagawa and Haze lost the Shimmer Tag Team Championship to Ayako Hamada and Ayumi Kurihara in their second defense. Later that same day on Volume 42, Nakagawa picked up her biggest singles victory in SHIMMER by pinning former SHIMMER Champion MsChif to win a four-way match, which also included Kellie Skater and LuFisto. The following day on Volume 43, Nakagawa was defeated by MsChif in a singles match. Nakagawa was forced to miss Shimmer's March 2012 tapings due to having prior commitments with Pro Wrestling Wave.

Nakagawa returned to SHIMMER on October 27, 2012, defeating Davina Rose as part of Volume 49. Later that same night on Volume 50, Nakagawa was defeated by Athena. The following night on Volume 51, Nakagawa defeated Veda Scott in a singles match. Later that same night on Volume 52, Nakagawa, in her final match of the weekend, teamed with Kellie Skater as the "Global Green Gangsters" (3G) in a tag team match, where they defeated Christina Von Eerie and MsChif. On April 6, 2013, at the Volume 53 internet pay-per-view (iPPV), the Global Green Gangsters unsuccessfully challenged the Canadian NINJAs (Nicole Matthews and Portia Perez) for the Shimmer Tag Team Championship in a four-way match, which also included the teams of Kana and Lufisto, and Made in Sin (Allysin Kay and Taylor Made). A week later on April 13 at the tapings of Volume 54, Nakagawa and Skater defeated the Canadian NINJAs in another title match, however, the Shimmer Tag Team Championship did not change hands due to the match ending in a countout. Later that same day on Volume 55, Nakagawa and Skater continued chasing the Canadian NINJAs and the Shimmer Tag Team Championship, but, despite scoring a win over Regeneration X (Allison Danger and Leva Bates), were denied a rematch with the reigning champions. However, the following day, after Nakagawa and Perez wrestled to a double disqualification on Volume 56, following interference from both Skater and Matthews, the two teams were booked in one more title match against each other, contested under "No Disqualification, No Countout" rules. The match took place later that same day in the main event of Volume 57 and saw the Global Green Gangsters defeat the Canadian NINJAs to become the new Shimmer Tag Team Champions. Nakagawa returned to Shimmer on October 19 at Volume 58, where she and Skater made their first successful title defense against Kana and LuFisto. Later that same day on Volume 59, Nakagawa and Skater made their second successful defense against Made in Sin. The following day, Nakagawa and Skater made two more successful title defenses, defeating Nevaeh and Sassy Stephie on Volume 60 and Cherry Bomb and Kimber Lee on Volume 61. On October 25, Nakagawa made her debut for Shimmer's sister promotion, Shine Wrestling, when she and Skater successfully defended the Shimmer Tag Team Championship against Valkyrie (Allysin Kay and Ivelisse). On April 5, 2014, at the Volume 62 iPPV, Nakagawa and Skater successfully defended their title against Madison Eagles and Nicole Matthews. A week later at Volume 64, Nakagawa and Skater made another successful title defense against Leon and Ray. Nakagawa and Skater made two more successful title defenses the following day, defeating Rhia O'Reilly and Saraya Knight on Volume 65 and Cheerleader Melissa and Mercedes Martinez on Volume 66.

==== Final matches and retirement ====
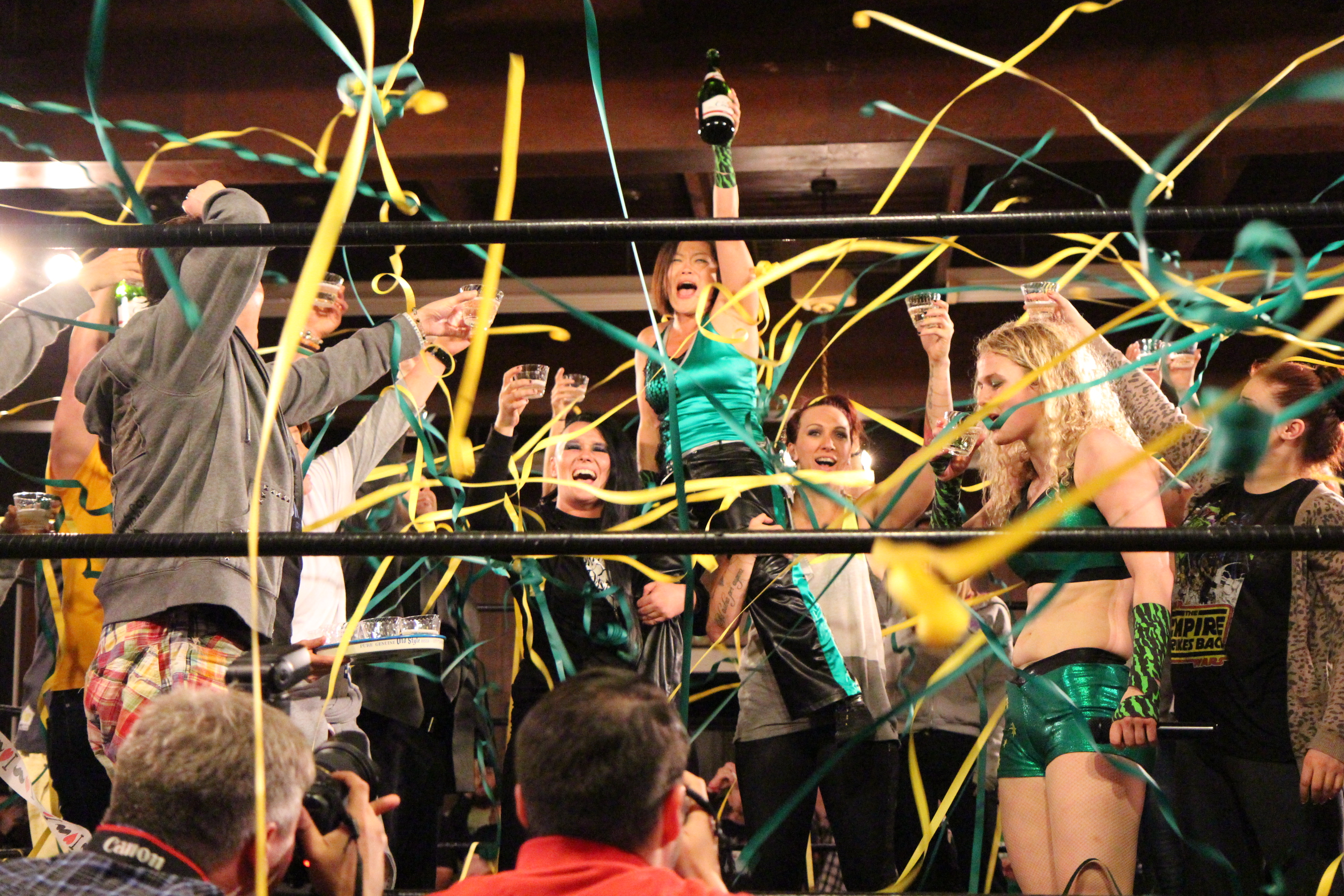
Nakagawa's final match took place at SHIMMER Volume 75. Nakagawa and Skater defeated the Canadian NINJAs (Nicole Matthews & Portia Perez) in the main event. Immediately afterwards a retirement ceremony was held and her career was celebrated by the entire roster.

After announcing her retirement, Nakagawa made a return to SHIMMER in October 2014. On October 18 at Volume 68, she and Skater made yet another successful defense of the Shimmer Tag Team Championship against Kaori Yoneyama and Tsukasa Fujimoto. The following day, the Global Green Gangsters also successfully defended their title against the team of Mayumi Ozaki and Saraya Knight on Volume 69. Later that same day on Volume 70, Nakagawa was scheduled to challenge Nicole Matthews for the Shimmer Championship, but the match, as well as a following Shimmer Tag Team Championship match between 3G and the Canadian NINJAs, ended in a disqualification due to outside interference. Finally, Nakagawa and Skater teamed with Jessicka Havok and Madison Eagles to defeat Matthews, Portia Perez, Cherry Bomb and Kimber Lee in an eight-woman tag team match to end the weekend.

After her Japanese retirement, Nakagawa made one more trip to SHIMMER for the final matches of her career, starting with Volume 71 on March 28, 2015, where she unsuccessfully challenged Nicole Matthews for the SHIMMER Championship due to outside interference from Portia Perez. On April 3, Nakagawa made her final appearance for Shine Wrestling, when she and Skater wrestled Shine Tag Team Champions Cherry Bomb and Kimber Lee to a double countout in a title vs. title match, meaning that both teams retained their respective titles. This led to a rematch back in SHIMMER on April 11 on Volume 72, where Nakagawa and Skater lost the SHIMMER Tag Team Championship, ending their two-year reign. The following day on Volume 74, Nakagawa teamed with Skater, Hiroyo Matsumoto and Misaki Ohata in an eight-woman tag team match, where they were defeated by Aja Kong, Dynamite Kansai, Kyoko Kimura and Mayumi Ozaki. Nakagawa's retirement match took place later that same day on Volume 75. Teaming with Skater, the two defeated the Canadian NINJAs, with Nakagawa pinning Shimmer Champion Nicole Matthews for the final win of her career. Despite her retirement, Nakagawa made an appearance at the October 11, 2015, Shimmer tapings, taking part in Portia Perez's retirement match by managing Team Danger in the eight-woman tag team match against Team Perez.

== Championships and accomplishments ==
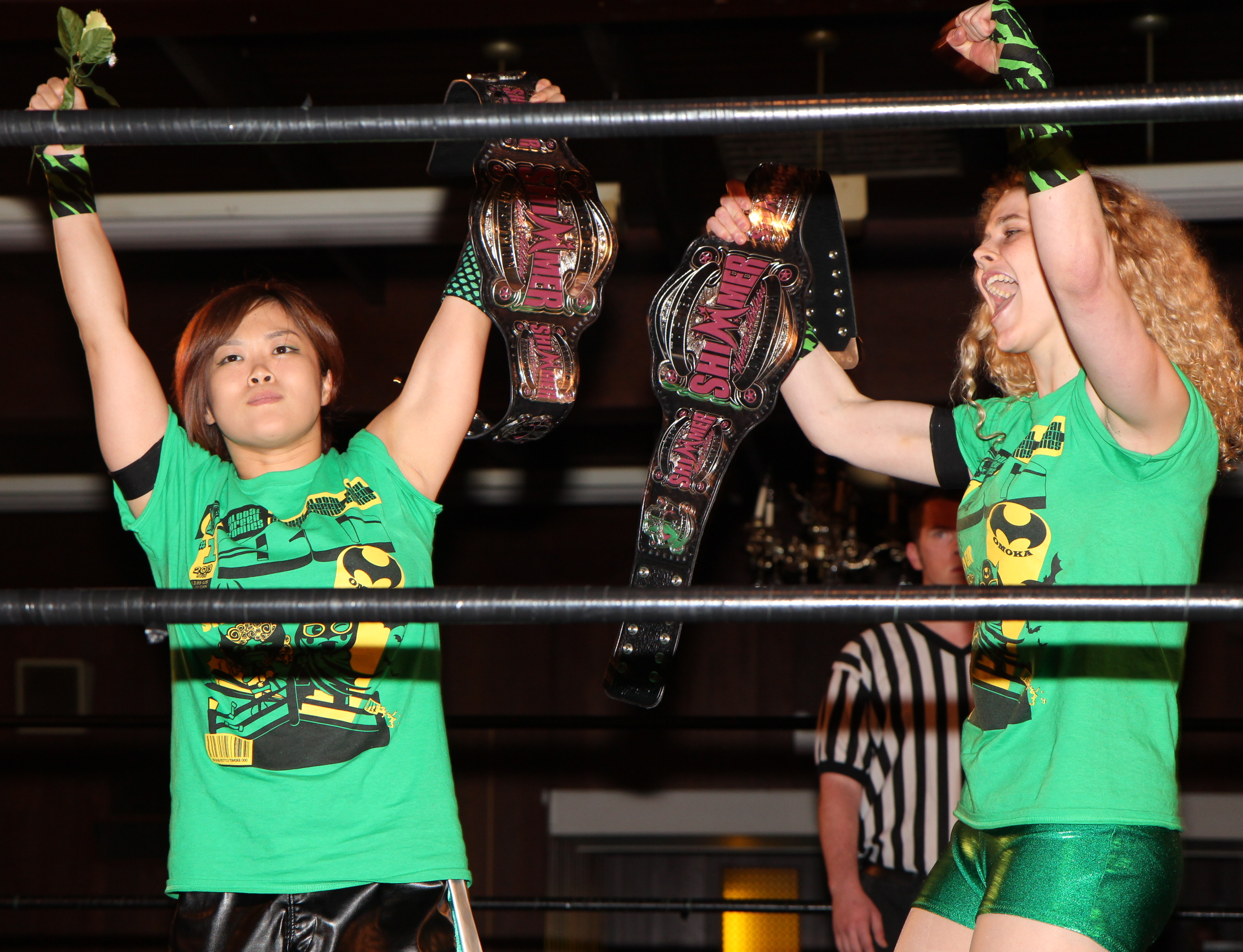
Nakagawa and Skater as SHIMMER Tag Team Champions in 2012

- Kaientai Dojo
  - FMW/WEW Hardcore Tag Team Championship (1 time) – with Taka Michinoku
- Oz Academy
  - Oz Academy Tag Team Championship (3 times) – with Hiroyo Matsumoto
  - Oz Academy Openweight Championship Next Challenger Determination Tournament (2014)
  - Best Wizard Award (1 time)
    - Best Tag Team Match Award (2011) with Hiroyo Matsumoto vs. Chikayo Nagashima and Sonoko Kato on January 9
- Pro Wrestling Wave
  - Wave Interim Tag Team Championship (1 time) – with Gami
  - Wave Tag Team Championship (3 times) – with Gami (2), and Kyoko Kimura (1)
  - 6-Person Tag Tournament (2013) – with Gami and Kyoko Kimura
  - Dual Shock Wave (2014) – with Kyoko Kimura
  - Catch the Wave Award (1 time)
    - Technique Award (2011)
- SHIMMER Women Athletes
  - SHIMMER Tag Team Championship (2 times) – with Daizee Haze (1) and Kellie Skater (1)
- Smash
  - Smash Diva Championship (1 time)
