= Rohit Raju =

Indian professional wrestler (born 1980)

Personal information
- Born: March 20, 1980 (age 46) Saginaw, Michigan, U.S.

Professional wrestling career
- Ring name(s): Hakim Zane; Mad Dragon; Rohit Raju
- Billed height: 5 ft 8 in (173 cm)
- Billed weight: 172 lb (78 kg)
- Billed from: Hyderabad, India
- Trained by: Xavier Justice
- Debut: 2008

Rohit Raju (born March 20, 1980) is an American professional wrestler, He is currently performs on the independent circuit. He is best known for his time with Impact Wrestling, where he is a former one-time Impact X Division Champion.

== Professional wrestling career ==
=== Early career ===
Under the ring name Hakim Zane, he debuted between 2008 and 2009. From then on, Zane worked in matches in promotions including for the National Wrestling Alliance and several NWA affiliates.

=== Xtreme Intense Championship Wrestling (2013–2018) ===
On April 14, 2013, Zane held his first title as co-holder of the XICW Tag Team Championship with TD Thomas. They held the tag titles until September 8, 2013, at XICW 167: Jacobs vs. Venom, where they lost the titles to challengers Sonny Scarboni and Vinnie Scarboni. The following year, Zane won his first singles championship on April 27, 2014, at XICW 177: Jacobs vs. Shelley, where he defeated The DBA to win the XICW Midwest Heavyweight Championship. He later lost the title on December 14 at XICW 187 Hardcore with a Heart, to former WWE Cruiserweight Shannon Moore.

The following year in 2015, Zane won the XICW Light Heavyweight Championship on January 17, 2015, at XICW Best in Detroit VIII, defeating Caleb Stills, Chris Sabin and Owen Travers in a four-way match. Three months later on April 12 at XICW 192, Zane lost the Light Heavyweight title to Owen Travers in a two-out-of-three-falls match. Zane later won the Midwest Heavyweight title for a second time. His second reign began on June 5, 2016, at XICW 210 after defeating Rhino. He went on to defend the Midwest Heavyweight title against challengers including Robbie E and Matt Cross. His final title defense was August 7, 2016 at XICW 213, successfully defeating Cross.

During 2017, Zane competed for the XICW Tag Team and Midwest Heavyweight titles on several occasions, however did not succeeding either title for a second time. He returned for one last match during a July 13, 2018 XICW show, challenging Jimmy Jacobs for the Midwest Heavyweight title but did not succeed in winning the championship.

=== Impact Wrestling ===
==== Sporadic appearances (2017–2018) ====
On the May 11, 2017, episode of Impact!, Zane teamed with Idris Abraham in a tag match lost against Garza Jr. and Laredo Kid. Six months later, Zane returned and wrestled in his first singles match. During the November 30 episode of Impact!, Zane lost his debut singles match to Taiji Ishimori. He made his final televised appearance of the year on the December 9 episode of Xplosion, losing to Eddie Edwards.

Zane returned the following year on the January 11, 2018, episode Impact!, teaming with Caleb Konley and Trevor Lee in a six-man tag match lost to Dezmond Xavier, Garza Jr. and Sonjay Dutt. The following month on the February 8 episode of Impact!, Zane debuted the ring name Rohit Raju, teaming with El Hijo del Fantasma in a tag match lost against Ishimori and Matt Sydal.

==== Desi Hit Squad (2018–2020) ====
On March 16 (which was taped on March 3) at Impact One Night Only: March Breakdown, Raju debuted with Gursinder Singh as the Desi Hit Squad. During the event, they defeated Sheldon Jean and Stone Rockwell. On the March 22 episode of Impact!, Raju challenged for the X Division Championship but lost to the reigning champion Sydal. For the course of the year, Raju and Gursinder Singh shared the ring as teammates and as opponents. Their final match was a singles competition during the October 11 episode of Impact! in which he defeated Gursinder Singh. By the November 1 episode of Impact!, the Desi Hit Squad was modified with the addition of Raj Singh, replacing Gursinder Singh. During the episode, they defeated The Beach Bums (Freddie IV and TJ Crawford). Raju wrestled his final match of the year on the November 22 episode of Impact!, teaming with Eli Drake, Jake Crist, Katarina and Glenn Gilbertti in the Second Annual Eli Drake Gravy Train Turkey Trot match, losing to Fallah Bahh, Alisha Edwards, Kikutaro, KM and Dezmond Xavier.

The following year, Raju returned with Raj Singh on the January 3, 2019, episode of Impact! in a tag team match against Bahh and KM, which was observed an "audition" by Impact Knockout Scarlett Bordeaux. The match concluded with the Desi Hit Squad losing to Bahh and KM. During the January 25 episode of Impact!, the Desi Hit Squad lost another tag team bout to The Rascalz (Dez and Wentz). During the early months of 2019, Raju competed in tag matches. On March 9 at Impact Wrestling-OVW One Night Only: Clash In The Bluegrass, Raju teamed with oVe (Dave Crist and Jake Crist), Madman Fulton in a tag match against Dustin Jackson, Melvin Maximus, Sam Thompson and Shiloh Jonze.

==== X Division Champion (2020–2022) ====
On August 18, 2020, during Night 1 of Emergence, Raju defeated Chris Bey to win the X Division Championship in a three-way match that also involved TJP. On the September 15 episode of Impact!, he had Bey, TJP and Trey compete in a three-way match next week to determine who will face him for the title immediately afterwards, which Trey won but Raju quickly defeated him in his first title defense. At Victory Road, he issued the Defeat Rohit Challenge with his X Division Championship on the line, which was answered by Willie Mack but he took the count-out loss to retain the title. On the October 6 episode of Impact!, Raju lost to Jordynne Grace who answered his challenge, but changed the rules so that the title wasn't up for grabs. At Bound for Glory, Raju successfully retained his X Division Championship in a six-way intergender scramble match that involved Bey, Grace, TJP, Mack and Trey, the latter of which he pinned to win the match. On November 14 at Turning Point, Raju retained his title against Cousin Jake. On the November 24 episode of Impact!, he lost to Crazzy Steve disguised as Suicide, but managed to defeat him on the following week to retain his title. At Final Resolution, Raju lost the title to Manik, ending his reign at 120 days.

On January 16, 2021, at Hard To Kill, he failed to regain the X Division Championship in a three-way match that also involved Bey. On the February 2 episode of Impact!, Raju defeated TJP in a non-title bout, with help from returning Desi Hit Squad ally Mahabali Shera. At No Surrender, he failed to recapture the X Division title and put the blame on Shera during the following week's Impact!, resulting in him getting shoved into Chris Sabin and James Storm, and the latter hitting Raju with a beer bottle on the head. Raju would lose to Storm on the March 2 episode of Before the Impact and team with Shera in a losing effort against him and Sabin on the following week's Impact!, the latter of which saw his alliance with Shera end. This led to a match between the two on the March 16 episode of Impact!, where Raju won after using the ropes. On the March 30 episode of Before the Impact, Raju teamed up with Hernandez to defeat Shera and Fallah Bahh. On April 10, at Hardcore Justice, he realigned himself with Shera after helping him against Hernandez in a Chairly Legal match.

On the May 13 episode of Impact!, Raju competed in a six-way match to determine the number one contender for the X Division Championship, which was won by New Japan Pro-Wrestling (NJPW) talent El Phantasmo. Two days later, at Under Siege, he teamed with Shera in a four-way tag team match to determine who will get a shot at the Impact World Tag Team Championship, which was won by Ace Austin and Madman Fulton. On June 12, at Against All Odds, Raju competed in a five-way match to determine a number one contender for the X Division title, but it ended in a no contest. At Slammiversary, Raju failed to win the title in an Ultimate X match, which was won by defending champion Josh Alexander. On the August 5 episode of Impact!, he lost a four-way match to determine the number one contender to the X Division title, which was won by Jake Something. Raju went on to feud with Matt Cardona after costing him a match on the following week's Impact!, but failed to beat him in a one-on-one bout at Emergence. On the September 2 episode of Impact!, Raju teamed with Shera to face Cardona and Chelsea Green in a tag team match, with Raju getting the pin after hitting the latter with a knee strike. At Victory Road, he took on Cardona in a no disqualification match, but was defeated by him.

On the September 23 episode of Impact!, Raju defeated Chelsea Green in an intergender match, after a distraction from returning Desi Hit Squad ally Raj Singh. On the October 14 episode of Impact!, he competed in a three-way semi-final match to determine who will go on to Bound for Glory in another three-way match for the vacant X Division Championship, which was won by El Phantasmo. At Bound for Glory, Raju participated in the Call Your Shot Gauntlet match, where the winner could choose any championship match of their choice, eliminating NJPW talent Rocky Romero and Madman Fulton but was eliminated by Moose and W. Morrissey. He left Impact in January 2022.

=== All Elite Wrestling (2022) ===
On January 15, 2022, Rohit made his AEW debut on AEW Dark #138 in a losing effort to Shawn Dean. He has wrestled a handful of matches for AEW since.

== Championships and accomplishments ==
- All American Wrestling
  - AAW Heritage Championship (2 times)
  - AAW Tag Team Championship (1 time) — with Karam
- Alpha-1 Wrestling
  - A1 Zero Gravity Championship (1 time)
- Border City Wrestling
  - BCW Can-Am Tag Team Championship (2 times) – with Raj Singh (1) and Sheldon Jean (1)
- For Us Wrestling
  - FUW Tag Team Championship (1 time, current) – with Zeeko
- Glory Pro Wrestling
  - Midwest Territory Championship (1 time)
- Impact Wrestling
  - Impact X Division Championship (1 time)
  - Global Forged (2017)
- Pro Wrestling Illustrated
  - Ranked No. 72 of the top 500 singles wrestlers in the PWI 500 in 2021
- Superkick'D
  - Superkick'D King of the 6IX Championship (1 time)
- Xtreme Intense Championship Wrestling
  - XICW Light Heavyweight Championship (1 time)
  - XICW Midwest Heavyweight Championship (2 times)
  - XICW Xtreme Intense Championship (1 time)
  - XICW Tag Team Championship (1 time) – with TD Thomas
