= Kellie Skater =

American professional wrestler

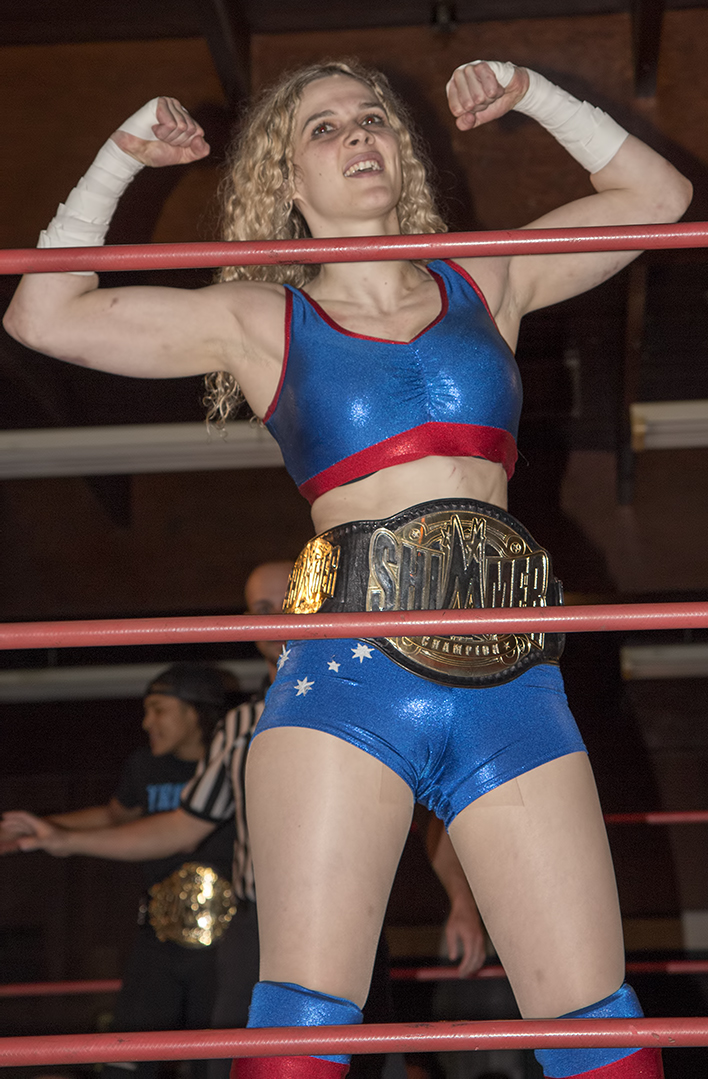
- Skater as SHIMMER Champion in 2016

Personal information
- Born: Callee Keating; 30 September 1987 (age 38) Bacchus Marsh, Victoria, Australia

Professional wrestling career
- Ring name: Kellie Skater
- Billed height: 5 ft 7 in (1.70 m)
- Billed weight: 139 lb (63 kg; 9.9 st)
- Billed from: Bacchus Marsh, Victoria, Australia
- Trained by: George Julio; Shon Bester; Mike Burr
- Debut: 2007
- Retired: 25 February 2017

Callee Keating (born 30 September 1987) is an Australian retired professional wrestler best known by her ring name Kellie Skater. She has wrestled internationally, in Australia, Canada, Japan and the United States. She is perhaps best known for her work in Shimmer Women Athletes, where she is a former Shimmer Champion and a former Shimmer Tag Team Champion together with Tomoka Nakagawa as 3G (Global Green Gangsters), Together as a team, they also hold the record for the longest reign at 727 days.

== Career ==
=== Early career; Australian promotions ===
Skater made her professional wrestling debut in March 2007 in a battle royal, after training for two months. Skater has been documented to have wrestled for Pro Wrestling Women's Alliance (PWWA) since July 2007. On 31 May 2008, Skater defeated Vixsin in a lumberjack match to become the first PWWA Champion. On 2 August 2008, Skater lost her title with a defeat against Jessie McKay.

On 3 July 2010, Skater won a Last Woman Standing tournament in PWWA, by first defeating Miami, then Savannah Summers and lastly Madison Eagles in the final following interference. Skater was granted a PWWA championship match on 6 August 2010, against defending champion Eagles and Jessie McKay in a three-way match, but Eagles retained her title.

While wrestling for New Horizon Pro Wrestling, Skater defeated champion Bombshell Bo to win the IndyGurlz Australian Title on 16 July 2011; she lost the title on 31 August 2012 to Sway.

While wrestling for Pacific Pro Wrestling (PPW), Skater defeated champion Madison Eagles on 21 September 2013 to become the Pacific Women's Champion, and went on to retain her title against Storm on 16 November 2013. She lost the title to Kellyanne at a New Horizons Pro Wrestling event on 22 May 2015.

=== SHIMMER and Shine ===
Skater made her debut for SHIMMER Women Athletes on 2 May 2009, where she issued an open challenge on SHIMMER Volume 23, and was answered and defeated by LuFisto. Skater scored her first SHIMMER victory on SHIMMER Volume 24 over Jessie McKay.

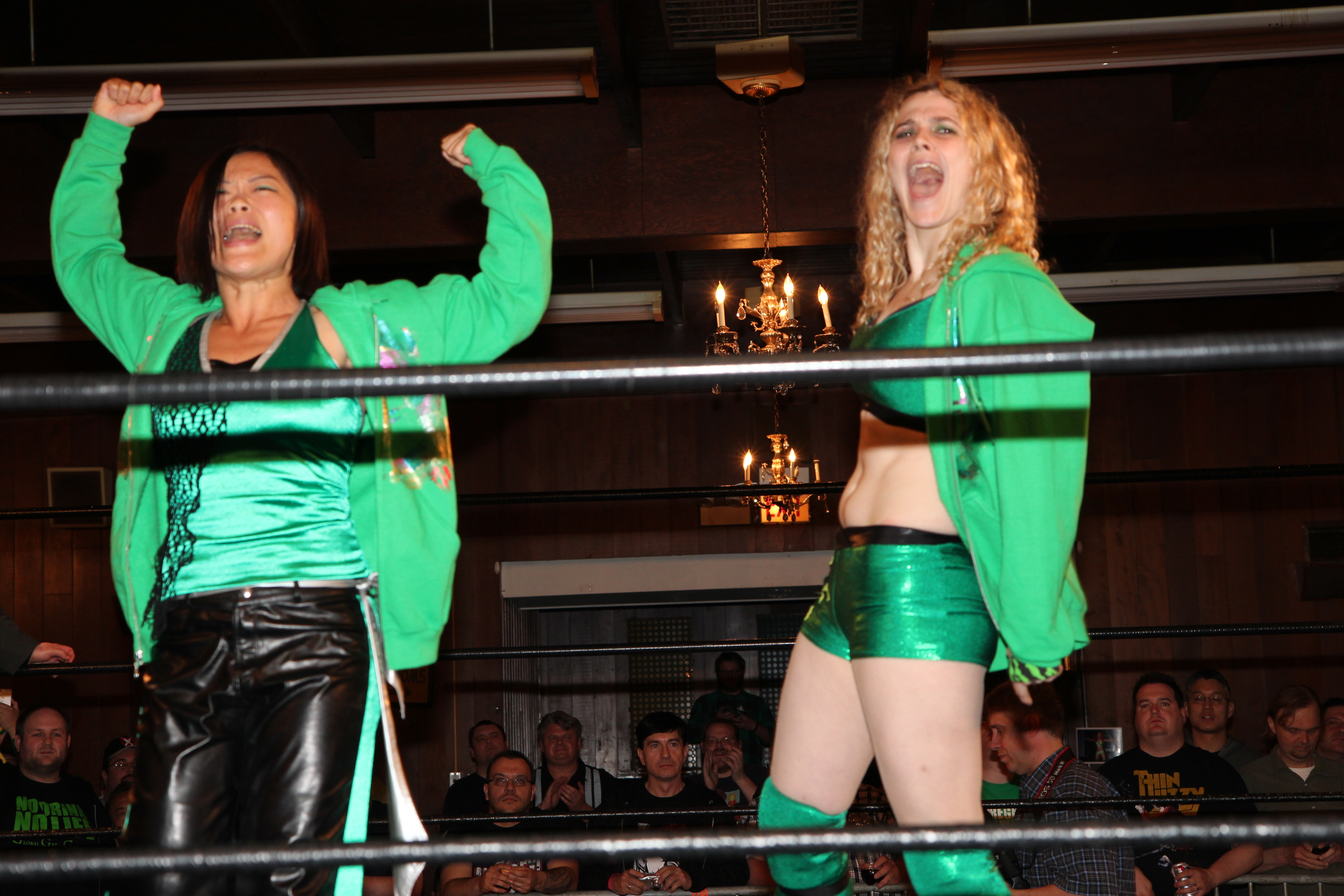
Skater alongside her long-term tag team partner Tomoka Nakagawa. Together the duo were known as Global Green Gangsters.

From 2009 to 2012 in SHIMMER, Skater did not experience much success in her singles matches; in Volume 30, she lost to Mercedes Martinez. In 2010's Volume 33 and Volume 35, Skater's open challenges were answered by Serena Deeb and later Amazing Kong, both of whom promptly defeated Skater. In 2011's Volume 37, it was MsChif who answered another open challenge and defeated Skater.

On 19 October 2012, Skater debuted for Shine Wrestling, a sister promotion of SHIMMER, at the Shine 4 internet pay-per-view, where she lost against Reby Sky. Later in October 2012, Skater had her first match with Tomoka Nakagawa as her partner at Volume 2012, where they defeated MsChif and Christina Von Eerie. On the Volume 53 iPPV on 6 April 2013, Skater and Nakagawa wrestled a four-way elimination tag match for the Shimmer Tag Team Championship, and they were the last team eliminated by defending champions The Canadian NINJAs (Nicole Matthews and Portia Perez) when the Ninjas cheated to win. At Volume 54, Skater and Nagagawa challenged the Ninjas again to a title match, but this time, the Ninjas voluntarily let themselves be counted out, thus retaining their titles.

Skater and Nakagawa went on to adopt the team name of 3G (Global Green Gangsters); During the main event of Volume 57 on 14 April 2013, 3G defeated the Canadian Ninjas in a no disqualification, no count-out match to capture the Shimmer Tag Team titles. At the Shine 14 iPPV in October 2013, 3G successfully retained their titles against Allysin Kay and Ivelisse.

At the SHIMMER Volume 62 iPPV on 5 April 2014, 3G retained their titles against the team of Nicole Matthews and Madison Eagles. At the Shine 18 iPPV on 20 April, Skater first won a four-way match against Justine Silver, Kay Lee Ray and Kimberly, then offered to replace the injured Madison Eagles to challenge for the Shine Tag Team Championship at the same event. Her request was accepted, but Skater and Evie lost to defending champions the Lucha Sisters (Leva Bates and Mia Yim). Skater and Nakagawa lost the Shimmer Tag Team Championship to Cherry Bomb and Kimber Lee on 11 April 2015.

On 13 November 2016, Skater defeated Mercedes Martinez for the Shimmer Championship. She lost the title back to Martinez the following day.

=== Other international exploits ===
From 2011 to 2013, Skater wrestled in Japan during the Japanese winter period (also the Australian summer period). Skater started out in Japan by wrestling for the S Ovation and Joshi4Hope promotions, and later branched out to wrestle for Wrestle-1, Zero1, Sendai Girls, Stardom, Wave and Reina. Skater had stated her interest to return or move to Japan, which she said is her "happy place".

From 2011, Skater has also wrestled in Canada for NCW Femmes Fatales.

On 6 December 2015, she won the vacant Artist of Stardom Championship alongside Evie and Hiroyo Matsumoto by defeating Io Shirai, Mayu Iwatani and Momo Watanabe and Oedo Tai (Act Yasukawa, Kris Wolf and Kyoko Kimura) in a three-way match to win the vacant title. They lost the title to Io Shirai, Kairi Hojo and Mayu Iwatani in their third defense on 28 February 2016.

=== Retirement ===
On 23 February 2017, Skater appeared at Stardom's show at Korakuen Hall to announce her retirement from professional wrestling. Her official retirement ceremony took place three days later at an Oz Academy event in Shinjuku Face.

== Championships and accomplishments ==
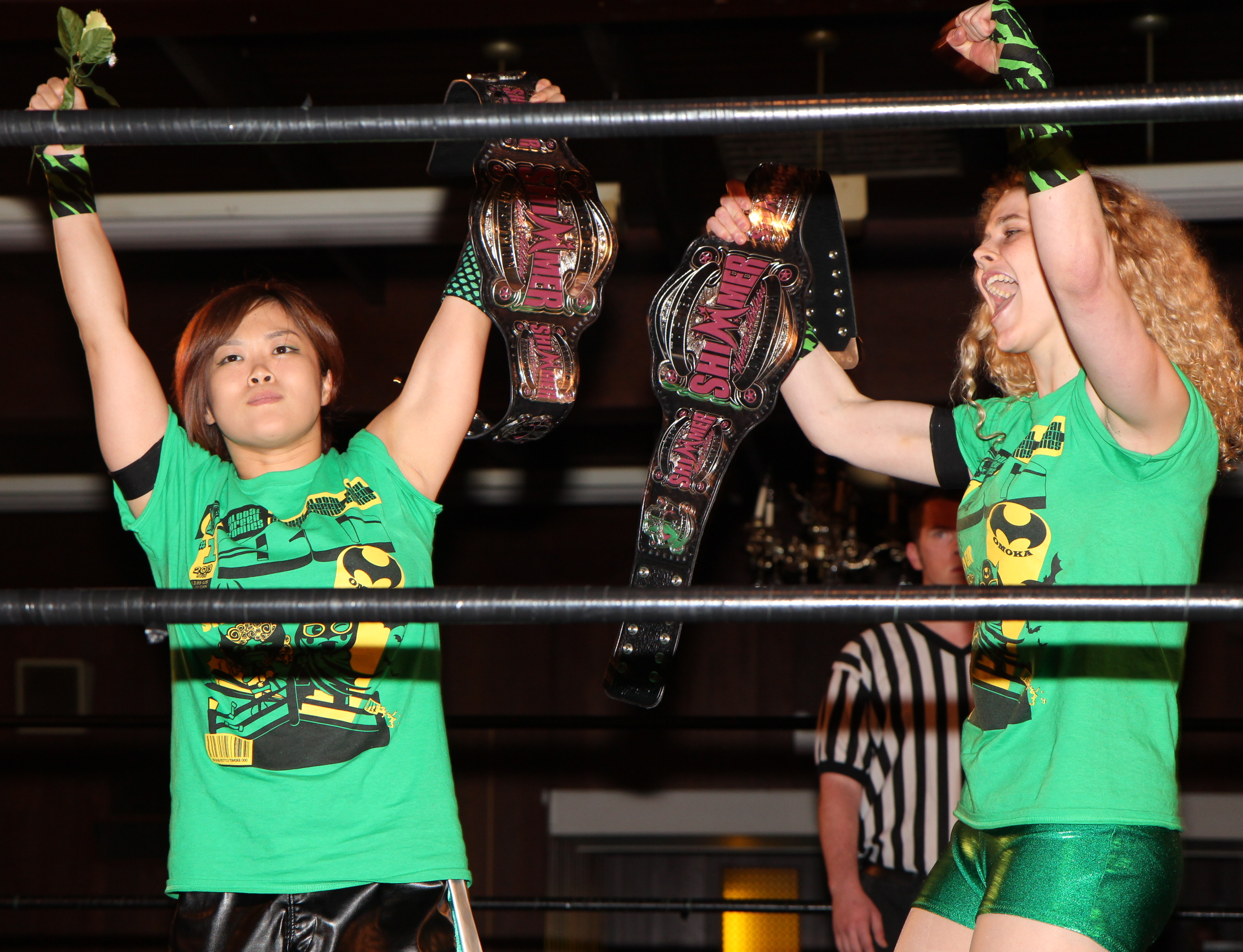
Skater and Nakagawa as SHIMMER Tag Team Champions in 2012

- New Horizon Pro Wrestling
  - IndyGurlz Australian Championship (1 time)
  - Global Conflict Shield Tournament (2015, 2016)
- Pacific Pro Wrestling
  - Pacific Women's Championship (1 time)
- Pro Wrestling Women's Alliance
  - PWWA Last Woman Standing Tournament
  - PWWA Championship (1 time)
- Pro Wrestling Illustrated
  - Ranked No. 15 of the top 50 female wrestlers in the PWI Female 50 in 2013
- Shimmer Women Athletes
  - Shimmer Championship (1 time)
  - Shimmer Tag Team Championship (1 time) – with Tomoka Nakagawa
- World Wonder Ring Stardom
  - Artist of Stardom Championship (1 time) – with Evie and Hiroyo Matsumoto
