= Shimmer Tag Team Championship =

Professional wrestling women's tag team championship

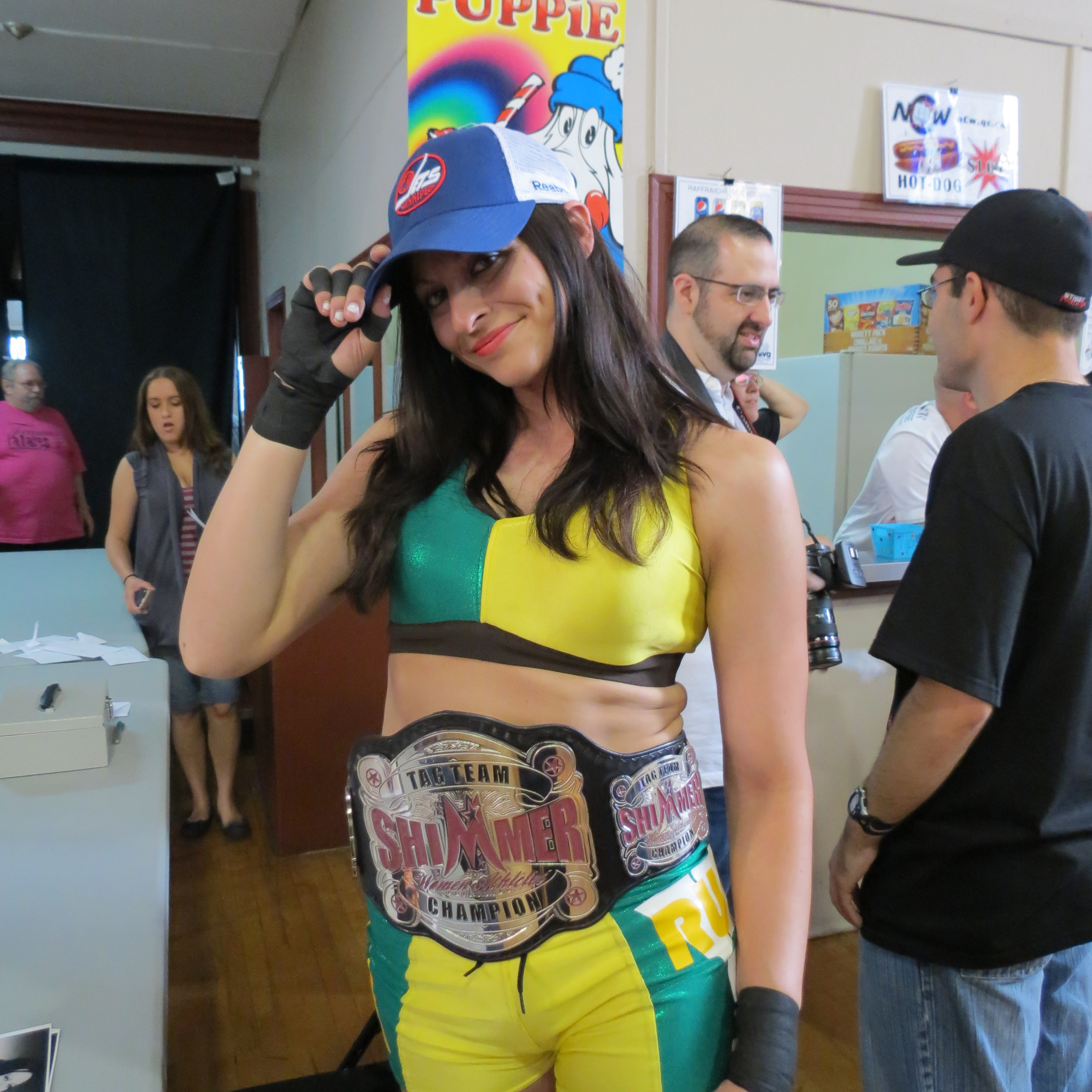
- Former champion Courtney Rush with the title.

Details
- Promotion: Shimmer Women Athletes
- Date established: August 7, 2008
- Date retired: November 1, 2021
Statistics
- First champions: Ashley Lane and Nevaeh
- Final champions: Team Sea Stars (Ashley Vox and Delmi Exo)
- Most reigns: As a team (2 reigns): Canadian NINJAs (Nicole Matthews and Portia Perez); As an individual (2 reigns): Nicole Matthews; Portia Perez; Tomoka Nakagawa
- Longest reign: Team Sea Stars (Ashley Vox and Delmi Exo) (730 days)
- Shortest reign: Seven Star Sisters (Hiroyo Matsumoto and Misaki Ohata) (1 day)

The Shimmer Tag Team Championship (stylized as SHIMMER Tag Team Championship) was a professional wrestling tag team championship in Shimmer Women Athletes. The title is recognized nationally by Ring of Honor, and also by several independent promotions, including American Luchacore, Insanity Pro Wrestling and Shine Wrestling, where it has also been defended. It has also been defended in Japan at Joshi 4 Hope independent events.

== History ==
Since the creation of the Shimmer Championship, there was a growing interest in creating a Shimmer Tag Team Championship. This was stemmed from a growing number of teams such as The Experience and The Minnesota Home Wrecking Crew, and frequent tag team matches on the cards of Shimmer events. In October 2008, the first champions were crowned when the duo of Ashley Lane and Nevaeh won a Gauntlet Match involving six teams at Shimmer Volume 21.

== Reigns ==
Key
No.	Overall reign number
Reign	Reign number for the specific team—reign numbers for the individuals are in parentheses, if different
Days	Number of days held
Defenses	Number of successful defenses
+	Current reign is changing daily

No.	Champion	Championship change			Reign statistics			Notes	Ref.
No.	Champion	Date	Event	Location	Reign	Days	Defenses	Notes	Ref.
Shimmer Women Athletes and Ring of Honor (ROH)
1	Ashley Lane and Nevaeh	October 19, 2008	Volume 21	Berwyn, IL	1	196	6	Nevaeh and Rayne defeated The Experience (Lexie Fyfe and Malia Hosaka) in a six–team Gauntlet match to become the inaugural champions.	
2	The Canadian NINJAs (Nicole Matthews and Portia Perez)	May 3, 2009	Volume 26	Berwyn, IL	1	692	5		
3	Seven Star Sisters (Hiroyo Matsumoto and Misaki Ohata)	March 26, 2011	Volume 37	Berwyn, IL	1	1	2		
4	Daizee Haze and Tomoka Nakagawa	March 27, 2011	Volume 40	Berwyn, IL	1	188	2		
5	Ayako Hamada and Ayumi Kurihara	October 1, 2011	Volume 41	Berwyn, IL	1	169	6	During the year 2011 the title stopped being defended & featured in Ring of Honor and in 2014 the company permanently stopped their partnership with Ring of Honor.	
Shimmer Women Athletes
6	The Queens of Winning (Courtney Rush and Sara Del Rey)	March 18, 2012	Volume 48	Berwyn, IL	1	111	0	This was a four corners tag team elimination match, also involving The Canadian NINJAs (Nicole Matthews and Portia Perez) and Regeneration X (Allison Danger and Leva Bates).	
7	The Canadian NINJAs (Nicole Matthews and Portia Perez)	July 7, 2012	NCW Femmes Fatales IX	Montreal, Quebec, Canada	2	281	5		
8	Global Green Gangsters (Kellie Skater and Tomoka Nakagawa)	April 14, 2013	Volume 57	Berwyn, IL	1 (1, 2)	727	13	This was a No Disqualification match.	
9	The Kimber Bombs (Cherry Bomb and Kimber Lee)	April 11, 2015	Volume 72	Berwyn, IL	1	442	5		
10	Team Slap Happy (Evie and Heidi Lovelace)	June 26, 2016	Volume 84	Berwyn, IL	1	140	3	This was a four corners tag team elimination match, also involving BaleSpin (K. C. Spinelli and Xandra Bale) and Fly High WDSS (Kay Lee Ray and Mia Yim).	
11	Mount Tessa (Tessa Blanchard and Vanessa Kraven)	November 13, 2016	Volume 89	Berwyn, IL	1	363	6		
12	Totally Tubular Tag Team (Delilah Doom and Leva Bates)	November 11, 2017	Volume 97	Berwyn, IL	1	344	6		
13	Cheerleader Melissa and Mercedes Martinez	October 21, 2018	Volume 107	Berwyn, IL	1	377	4	This was a four-way tag team elimination match also involving The Blue Nation (Charli Evans and Jessica Troy) and The Killer Death Machines (Jessicka Havok and Nevaeh).	
14	Team Sea Stars (Ashley Vox and Delmi Exo)	November 2, 2019	Volume 115	Berwyn, IL	1	730	5		
—	Deactivated	November 1, 2021	—	—	—	—	—	On November 1, 2021, this title became deactivated.	

== Combined reigns ==
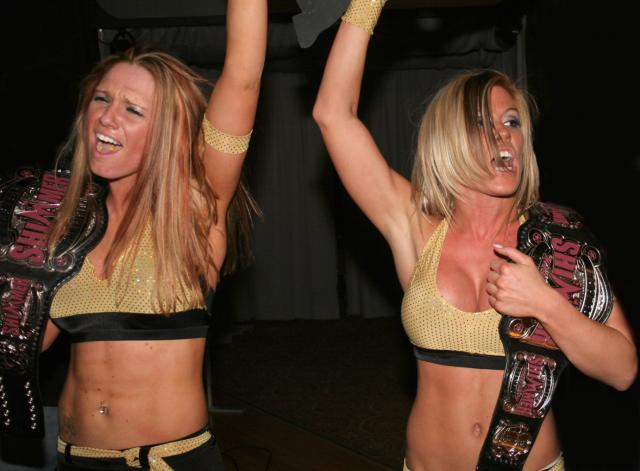
Inaugural champions Ashley Lane and Nevaeh with the belts

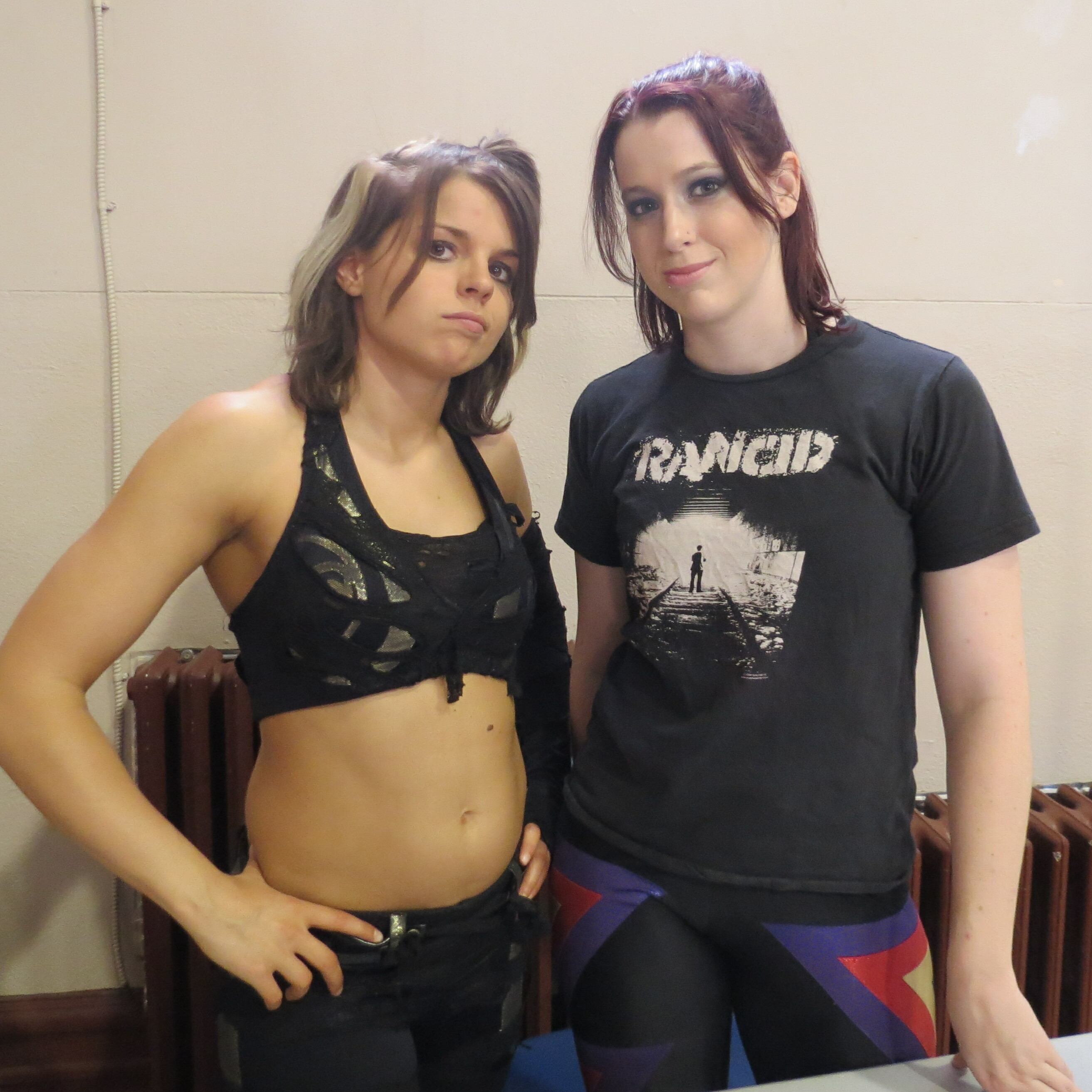
The Canadian NINJAs (Portia Perez and Nicole Matthews) were the only team to ever hold the Shimmer Tag Team Championship twice, were the longest reigning team overall, and the only team to ever win the titles outside of the United States

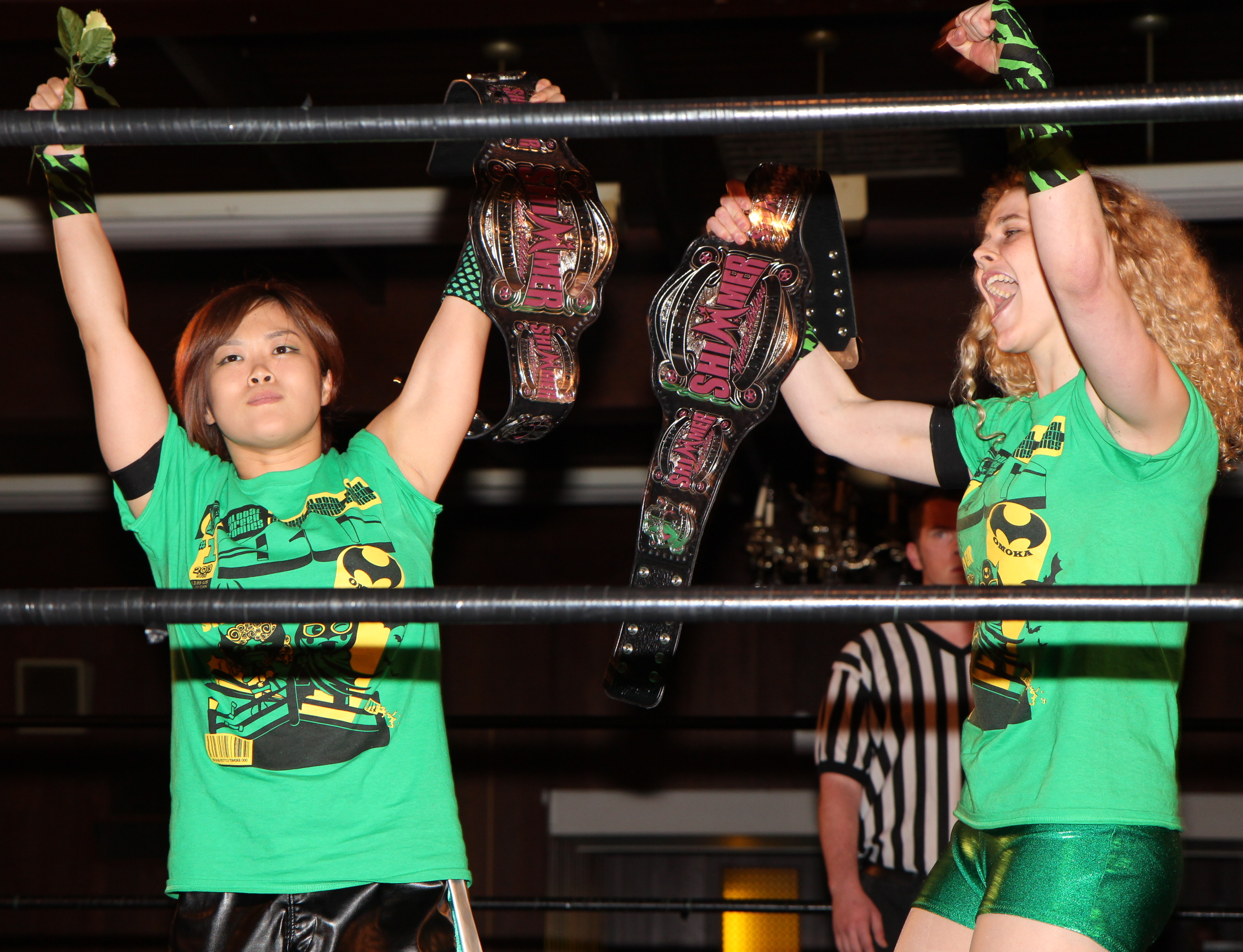
Global Green Gangsters (Kellie Skater and Tomoka Nakagawa) had the most successful title defenses of any team ever to hold the titles

As of June 7, 2026

†	Indicates the current champion

=== By team ===
Rank	Wrestler	No. of reigns	Combined defenses	Combined days
1	Canadian NINJAs (Nicole Matthews and Portia Perez)	2	10	973
2	Team Sea Stars (Ashley Vox and Delmi Exo)	1	5	730
3	Global Green Gangsters (Kellie Skater and Tomoka Nakagawa)	1	13	727
4	The Kimber Bombs (Cherry Bomb and Kimber Lee)	1	5	442
5	Cheerleader Melissa and Mercedes Martinez	1	4	377
6	Mount Tessa (Tessa Blanchard and Vanessa Kraven)	1	6	363
7	Totally Tubular Tag Team (Delilah Doom and Leva Bates)	1	5	344
8	Ashley Lane and Nevaeh	1	6	196
9	Daizee Haze and Tomoka Nakagawa	1	1	188
10	Ayako Hamada and Ayumi Kurihara	1	6	169
11	Team Slap Happy (Evie and Heidi Lovelace)	1	3	140
12	The Queens of Winning (Courtney Rush and Sara Del Rey)	1	0	111
13	Seven Star Sisters (Hiroyo Matsumoto and Misaki Ohata)	1	2	1

=== By wrestler ===
Rank	Wrestler	No. of reigns	Combined defenses	Combined days
1	Nicole Matthews	2	10	973
1	Portia Perez	2	10	973
4	Ashley Vox	1	5	730
4	Delmi Exo	1	5	730
5	Kellie Skater	1	13	727
6	Tomoka Nakagawa	2	14	915
7	Cherry Bomb	1	5	442
7	Kimber Lee	1	5	442
9	Cheerleader Melissa	1	4	377
9	Mercedes Martinez	1	4	377
11	Tessa Blanchard	1	5	363
11	Vanessa Kraven	1	5	363
13	Delilah Doom	1	6	344
13	Leva Bates	1	6	344
15	Ashley Lane	1	6	196
15	Nevaeh	1	6	196
17	Daizee Haze	1	1	188
18	Ayako Hamada	1	7	169
18	Ayumi Kurihara	1	7	169
20	Evie	1	3	140
20	Heidi Lovelace	1	3	140
22	Courtney Rush	1	0	111
22	Sara Del Rey	1	0	111
24	Hiroyo Matsumoto	1	2	1
24	Misaki Ohata	1	2	1

== See also ==
- Women's World Tag Team Championship
