= Sea Stars (professional wrestling) =

Professional wrestling tag team

Team Sea Stars
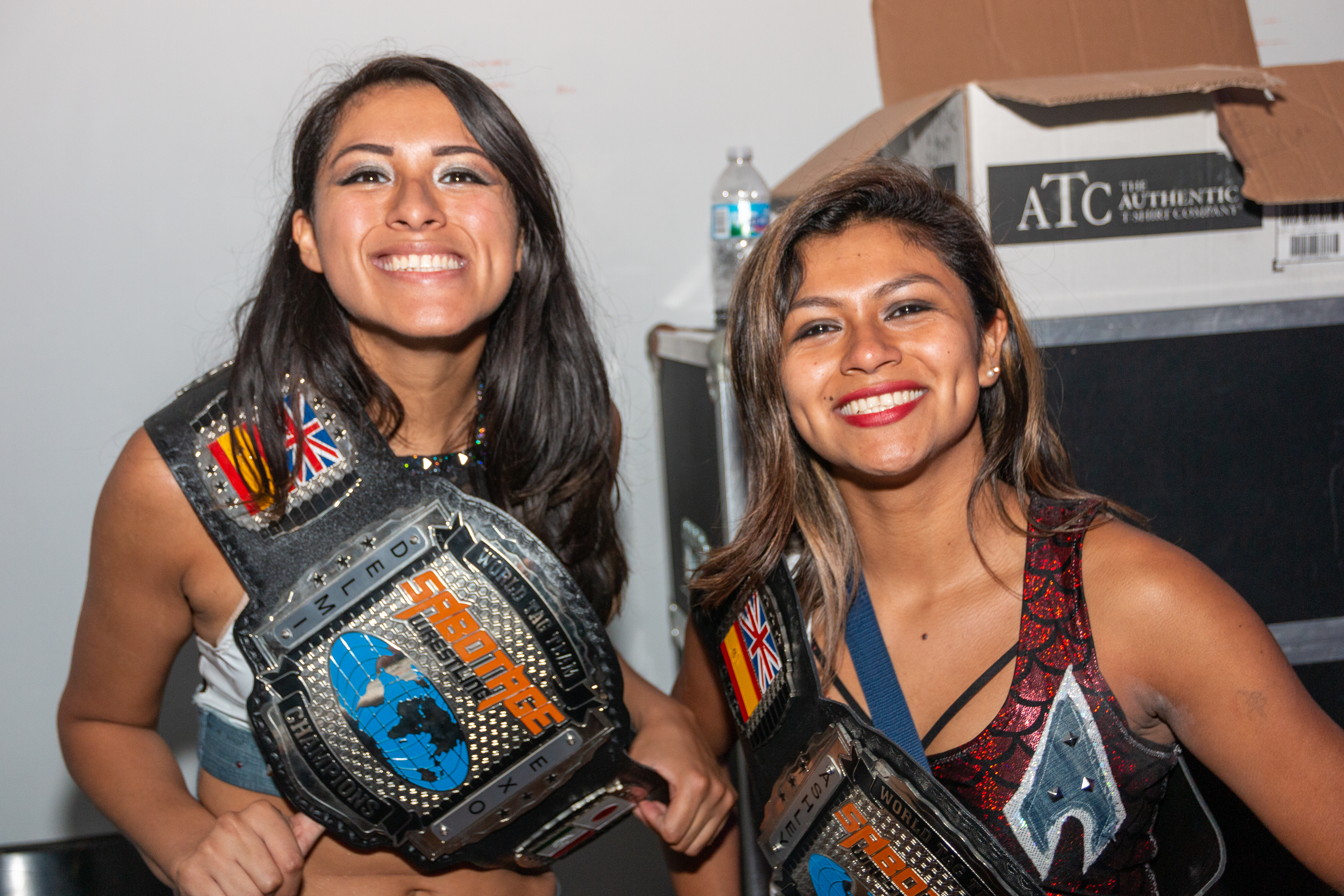
- Team Sea Stars in August 2019: Delmi Exo (left) and Ashley Vox (right)

Stable
- Members: Ashley Vox; Delmi Exo
- Names: Sea Stars; Team Sea Stars; Ashley Vox and Delmi Exo
- Combined billed weight: 248 lb (112 kg)
- Billed from: Providence, Rhode Island
- Debut: August 29, 2015
- Years active: 2015–present

The Sea Stars, also known as Team Sea Stars, are a professional wrestling tag team consisting of sisters Ashley Vox and Delmi Exo (real names Ashley and Elizabeth Medrano). The two were the longest reigning Shimmer Tag Team Champions in history, holding the titles until the company’s shutdown in 2021 therefore making them the final champions as well.

== History ==
They first fought together in 2015. They have appeared in All Elite Wrestling (AEW), Impact Wrestling, Ring of Honor (ROH) and notably for Shimmer Women Athletes, where they became Shimmer Tag Team Champions in 2019.

=== Independent Circuit (2015–present) ===
The two began competing in Shimmer Women Athletes in 2019, where they won and became the Shimmer Tag Team Champions by defeating Cheerleader Melissa and Mercedes Martinez on November 2, 2019 at Volume 115. The two were the longest reigning Shimmer Tag Team Champions in history at 730 days during their first and only reign, holding the titles until the company’s shut down on November 1, 2021.

=== Impact Wrestling (2020) ===
The team joined Impact Wrestling in 2020 to compete for the revived Knockouts Tag Team Championship in the 2020 revival tournament but we're not successful as they lost to Fire 'N Flava in the first round. On December 12, at Final Resolution, they fought Havok and Nevaeh in a losing effort.

=== Ring of Honor (2018; 2021) ===
One half of The Sea Stars Ashley Vox had always been familiar with the ROH Women of Honor division as she wrestled in various ROH Women's matches in the ROH Women's division during years 2018 & 2021. On the December 22nd, 2021 episode of ROH Women's division wednesday's Delmi Exo also stepped into the ROH Women's division and made her ROH Women of Honor debut against Max the Impaler but was not successful as the Impaler pinned Delmi after using her finisher. (Amy Rose was in Max the Impaler's corner and Ashley Vox came to Delmi's comfort after the match and then the two as The Sea Stars had a tag team match against Angelina Love & Mandy Leon immediately after the two confronted The Sea Stars with a speech but we're not successful against Love & Leon.)

=== Major League Wrestling (MLW) (2021–2023) ===
The team wrestled on the MLW roster. On April 6, 2023 one half of The Sea Stars by the name of Delmi Exo won the MLW World Women's Featherweight Championship at MLW's Pay-per-view by the name of War Chamber of year 2023 by defeating the inaugural champion Taya Valkyrie.

== Championships and accomplishments ==
- Battle Club Pro
  - BCP Tag Team Championship (1 time)
- Sabotage Wrestling
  - Sabotage Tag Team Championship (1 time)
- Shimmer Women Athletes
  - Shimmer Tag Team Championship (1 time, final)
