= Bound for Glory (2020) =

2020 Impact Wrestling pay-per-view event

- Promotional poster featuring various Impact wrestlers
- Promotion: Impact Wrestling
- Date: October 24, 2020
- City: Nashville, Tennessee
- Venue: Skyway Studios
- Attendance: 0 (behind closed doors) (Note: The event was held without a paying audience due to the COVID-19 pandemic in the United States.)

Pay-per-view chronology
← Previous; Slammiversary	Next → Hard To Kill

Bound for Glory chronology
← Previous; 2019	Next → 2021

The 2020 Bound for Glory was a professional wrestling pay-per-view (PPV) event produced by Impact Wrestling. It took place on October 24, 2020 at the Skyway Studios in Nashville, Tennessee. It was the 16th event under the Bound for Glory chronology.

Eight matches were contested at the event, including one on the pre-show. In the main event, Rich Swann defeated Eric Young to win the Impact World Championship. In other prominent matches, The North (Ethan Page and Josh Alexander) defeated The Motor City Machine Guns (Alex Shelley and Chris Sabin), The Good Brothers (Doc Gallows and Karl Anderson), and Ace Austin and Madman Fulton to win the Impact World Tag Team Championship, and Su Yung defeated Deonna Purrazzo to win the Impact Knockouts Championship. This event is also notable for The Rock's first appearance in a wrestling promotion outside of WWE in 11 years as he inducted Ken Shamrock into the Impact Hall of Fame.

== Production ==
Other on-screen personnel
Commentator	Josh Mathews (PPV)
Commentator	Don Callis (Pre-show + PPV)
Commentator	Madison Rayne (Impact Knockouts Championship Match)
Commentator	Matt Striker (Pre-show)
Ring announcer	David Penzer
Referee	Brandon Tolle
Referee	Daniel Spencer
Interviewer	Gia Miller
Pre-show panel	Jon Burton
Pre-show panel	Madison Rayne
Pre-show panel	D'Lo Brown

=== Background ===
On July 18, 2020, at Slammiversary, it was announced that Bound for Glory would take place on October 24, 2020.

=== Storylines ===
The event featured professional wrestling matches that involves different wrestlers from pre-existing scripted feuds and storylines. Wrestlers portrayed villains, heroes, or less distinguishable characters in scripted events that build tension and culminate in a wrestling match or series of matches.

At Slammiversary, Rich Swann returned from injury and Eric Young—who last wrestled in Impact in 2016— made his return to Impact Wrestling in the five-way elimination match for the vacant Impact World Championship. During the match, Swann eliminated Young, who attacked Swann and re-injured his knee with a steel chair. The match and the title was eventually won by Eddie Edwards. On the August 4 episode of Impact!, Swann announced his kayfabe retirement from professional wrestling as a result of the injuries sustained from the attack. However, as he was exiting the ring, Young attacked Swann's leg again, using one of Swann's crutches. On the September 1 episode of Impact!, Young defeated Edwards to win the Impact World Championship for a second time. Two weeks later, Swann pleaded with Impact's executive vice president, Scott D'Amore, in the ring for a match against Young at Bound for Glory. Young then came to the ring and pushed D'Amore to the floor, only to then be attacked by Swann. D'Amore then announced that Young would defend his title against Swann at Bound for Glory. However, during the September 22 episode of Impact!, it was announced that Edwards had invoked his rematch clause and will challenge Young for the title at Victory Road, meaning the winner of that match would defend the title against Swann at Bound for Glory. At Victory Road, Young defeated Edwards to retain the title, thus meaning he will face Swann at Bound for Glory. After the match, Young tried to severely injure Edwards, only for Swann to come to the ring and save him.

At Slammiversary, Deonna Purrazzo defeated Jordynne Grace to win the Impact Knockouts Championship for the first time. On the same night, Kylie Rae won a 12-woman Gauntlet for the Gold match to become the #1 contender for the title. On the September 1 episode of Impact!, Rae and the rest of the members of "Wrestle House" (a segment of the show that Rae was participating in) interrupted a Black Tie Affair that Purrazzo and Kimber Lee were hosting to celebrate Purrazzo's successful title defense against Grace in a 30-minute iron man match during night two of Emergence. During the Black Tie Affair, Rae attacked Lee, causing her and Purrazzo to flee the ring screaming in anger. On the September 22 episode of Impact!, Rae and Susie defeated Purrazzo and Lee in a tag team match and after the match, Purrazzo attacked Susie with an armbar submission hold. Rae then interrupted, causing Purrazzo to flee the ring, and challenged Purrazzo to a title match at Bound for Glory. However, on the following week's episode of Impact!, it was announced during an interview with Purrazzo that she would defend the title against Susie at Victory Road, meaning the winner of the match would defend the title against Rae at Bound for Glory. At Victory Road, Purrazzo defeated Susie to retain the title, meaning she will face Rae at Bound for Glory. However, Rae did not appear at the event (which Impact had not provided an explanation for her absence during the show). Purrazzo issued an open challenge to defend her Impact Knockouts Championship which the returning Su Yung answered.

On August 18, during night one of Emergence, Rohit Raju defeated Chris Bey and TJP in a three-way match to win the Impact X Division Championship for the first time. On the September 15 episode of Impact!, he had Bey, TJP, and Trey compete in a three-way match next week to determine who will face him for the X Division Championship immediately afterwards, which Trey won, but Raju quickly defeated him to retain his title. At Victory Road, he issued an open challenge with the X Division Championship on the line, which was answered by Willie Mack, but he took the count-out loss to retain his title. On the October 6 episode of Impact!, Raju lost to Jordynne Grace, who answered his challenge, but changed the rules so that his title was not up for grabs. Afterwards, D'Amore told Raju that he would be defending the title at Bound for Glory in a six-way scramble that involves Bey, Grace, TJP, Trey, and Mack.

At Slammiversary, Moose defeated Tommy Dreamer in an Old School Rules match to retain the unsanctioned TNA World Heavyweight Championship. On the following episode of Impact!, after successfully defending the title against Fallah Bahh, he was attacked by EC3, who made his return to Impact since 2018. During night one of Emergence on August 18, Moose defeated Trey to retain his title but was soon attacked by EC3, who stole the TNA World Heavyweight Championship. The following weeks saw EC3 continually playing mind games with Moose and threatening to get rid of the title if he didn't find him. At Victory Road, after being distracted by him in his match against Trey, Moose went looking for EC3 and found the TNA World Heavyweight Championship but was attacked from behind by him, who announced he was going to hold a funeral for the title. On the October 6 episode of Impact!, he conducted the funeral by dropping the title off a bridge as way to "free Moose." Three days later, Impact announced that EC3 will face Moose at Bound for Glory in an undisclosed location. On the October 13 episode of Impact!, EC3 fooled Moose into thinking he had gotten rid of the title, and the latter confronted him at the bridge where they brawled and he reclaimed the TNA World Heavyweight Championship.

== Results ==
No.	Results	Stipulations	Times
1^{P}	The Deaners (Cody Deaner and Cousin Jake) defeated The Rascalz (Dez and Wentz)	Tag team match	3:42
2	Rohit Raju (c) defeated Chris Bey, Jordynne Grace, TJP, Trey, and Willie Mack	Six-way Intergender Scramble match for the Impact X Division Championship	13:20
3	Rhino won by last eliminating Sami Callihan	20-wrestler Intergender Call Your Shot Gauntlet match The winner could choose any championship match of their choice for the next year. Since Rhino won, Heath received a full time contract with Impact Wrestling. Had neither Heath nor Rhino won, Rhino would have been fired.	25:22
4	Moose defeated EC3	Singles match	9:49
5	Ken Shamrock (with Sami Callihan) defeated Eddie Edwards by submission	Singles match	12:32
6	The North (Ethan Page and Josh Alexander) defeated The Motor City Machine Guns (Alex Shelley and Chris Sabin) (c), The Good Brothers (Doc Gallows and Karl Anderson), and Ace Austin and Madman Fulton	Four-way tag team match for the Impact World Tag Team Championship	14:26
7	Su Yung defeated Deonna Purrazzo (c) (with Kimber Lee)	Singles match for the Impact Knockouts Championship	15:05
8	Rich Swann defeated Eric Young (c)	Singles match for the Impact World Championship	21:31
(c) / – the champion(s) heading into the match; P / – the match was broadcast on the pre-show

=== Call Your Shot Gauntlet entrances and eliminations ===
– Winner

Draw	Entrant	Order	Eliminated by	Time	Eliminations
1	Rhino	—	Winner	25:22	3
2	Daivari	2	Brian Myers and Swoggle		0
3	Larry D	10	James Storm and John E Bravo (Note: John E Bravo was not an official participant in the match.)		1
4	Crazzy Steve	1	Brian Myers		0
5	Acey Romero	11	Heath		1
6	Tenille Dashwood	6	Brian Myers		0
7	Havok	8	Taya Valkyrie		1
8	Brian Myers	12	Heath		6
9	Swoggle	3	Brian Myers		1
10	Tommy Dreamer	4	Brian Myers		0
11	Alisha Edwards	5	Brian Myers		0
12	Kiera Hogan	7	Havok		0
13	Taya Valkyrie	9	Larry D & Acey Romero		1
14	Fallah Bahh	13	Hernandez		0
15	James Storm	17	Sami Callihan		1
16	Adam Thornstowe	15	Rhino		0
17	Luster the Legend	16	Rhino		0
18	Heath	18	Sami Callihan		2
19	Sami Callihan	19	Rhino		2
20	Hernandez	14	Himself		1
