= Ashley Vox =

American professional wrestler (born 1989)

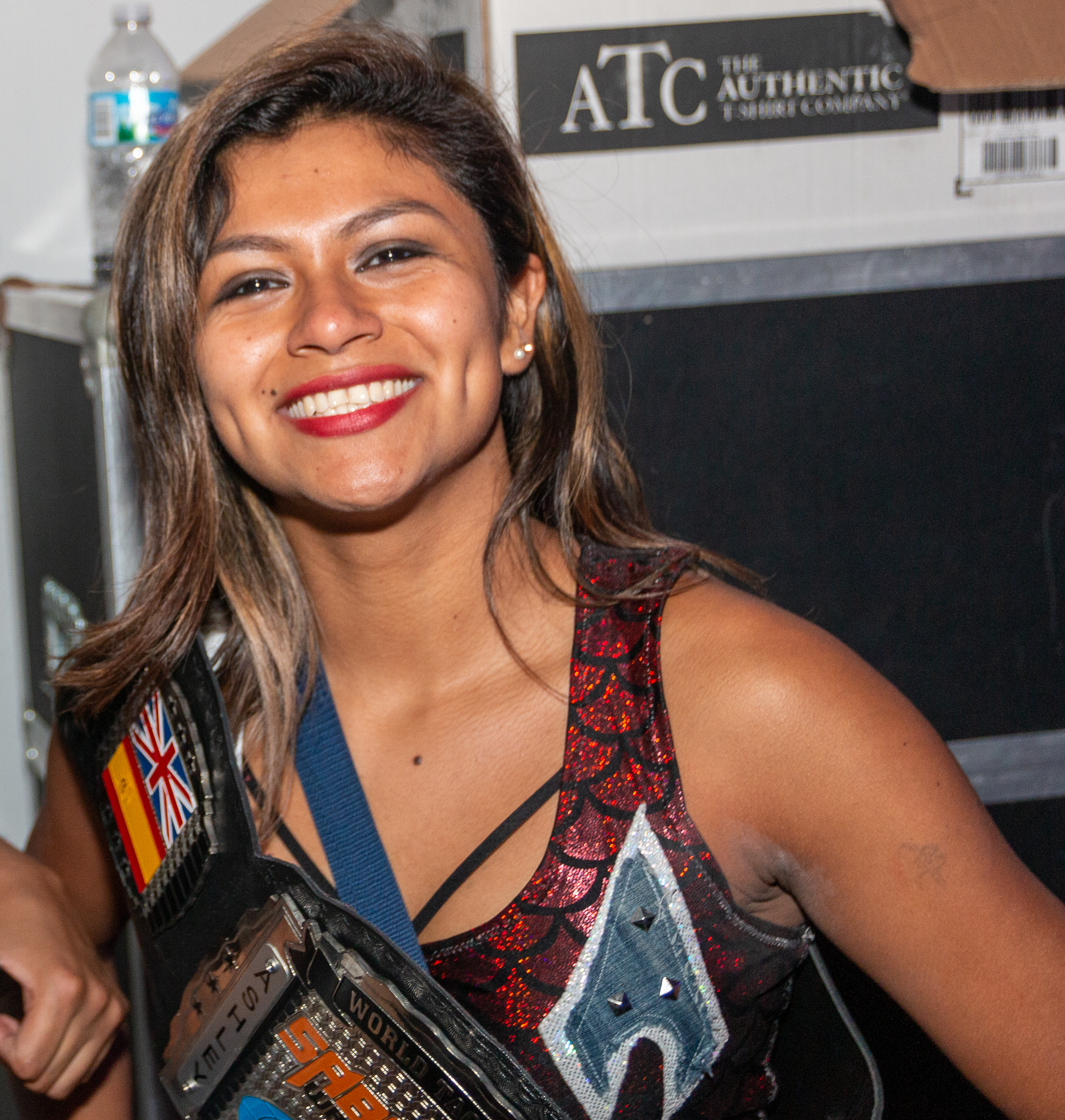
- Vox in 2019

Personal information
- Born: Ashley Medrano; November 1, 1989 (age 36) Providence, Rhode Island, U.S.

Professional wrestling career
- Ring name: Ashley Vox
- Billed height: 5 ft 3 in (160 cm)
- Billed weight: 114 lb (52 kg)
- Trained by: Doug Summers
- Debut: November 15, 2014

Ashley Medrano (born November 1, 1989), known under the ring name Ashley Vox, is an American professional wrestler. She performs with her younger sister Delmi Exo, as the Sea Stars. They were the longest reigning and final Shimmer Tag Team Champions in history.

== Professional wrestling career ==
=== Independent circuit (2014–present) ===
On April 28, 2017, Vox won the Chaotic Wrestling Women's Championship. Exo and Vox began competing in Shimmer Women Athletes in 2019 where they won and became the Shimmer Tag Team Champions by defeating Cheerleader Melissa and Mercedes Martinez on November 2, 2019, at Volume 115. She alongside Delmi Exo is also the longest reigning Shimmer Tag Team Champion in history at 730 days during their her reign.

=== Ring of Honor (2018, 2021) ===
On the September 12th, 2018 episode of Women of Honor Ashley Vox made her ROH Women of Honor Debut against in a six women tag team match as she Riley Shepherd & Kris Stadtlander faced Tenille Dashwood, Jenny Rose & Stella Grey but were not successful. On the November 17th, 2018 Vox made another appearance in the ROH WOH division as she took on Brandi Rhodes in a one-on-one match but was also not successful as Brandi Rhodes pinned her after her finisher.

On the October 6th, 2021 episode of ROH Women's division wednesday's Ashley Vox made her return to Ring of Honor in a match against Chelsea Green but was not successful. On November 17 episode of ROH's Women's division wednesday's Ashley Vox made her ROH Women of Honor return against the inaugural ROH Women of Honor Champion Sumie Sakai in a one-on-one match but was not successful against the female ROH veteran as she pinned Vox after using her finisher.

=== Impact Wrestling (2020) ===
Exo and Vox joined Impact Wrestling in 2020 to compete for the revived Knockouts Tag Team Championship in the 2020 revival tournament but were not successful as they lost to Fire 'N Flava in the first round. On December 12, at Final Resolution, they fought Havok and Nevaeh in a losing effort.

=== Major League Wrestling (2021) ===
On September 22, 2021, episode of Fusion: Alpha, MLW officially announced the launch of its MLW women's featherweight division and Exo and Vox were introduced as amongst the first female wrestlers in the division.

=== All Elite Wrestling (2024) ===
Vox made her AEW debut on the November 9, 2024 episode of Collision, which took place in her hometown of Providence, Rhode Island, where she was defeated by Kris Statlander.

== Personal life ==
Medrano is openly lesbian.

== Championships and accomplishments ==
- Battle Club Pro
  - BCP Tag Team Championship (1 time) – with Delmi Exo
  - BCP Tag Team Title Tournament (2020) - with Delmi Exo
- Chaotic Wrestling
  - Chaotic Wrestling Women's Championship (1 time)
- Pro Wrestling Illustrated
  - Ranked No. 66 of the top 100 female wrestlers in the PWI Women's 100 in 2020
  - Ranked No. 318 of the top 500 singles wrestlers in the PWI 500 in 2021
- Sabotage Wrestling
  - Sabotage Tag Team Championship (1 time) – with Delmi Exo
- Shimmer Women Athletes
  - Shimmer Tag Team Championship (1 time, final) – with Delmi Exo

== Luchas de Apuestas record ==
Winner (wager)	Loser (wager)	Location	Event	Date	Notes
Ashley Vox and Kris Statlander (career)	Jeremy Leary and Skylar (hair)	Portland, Maine	Limitless Know Your Enemy	September 6, 2019	
