= Delmi Exo =

American professional wrestler (born 1996)

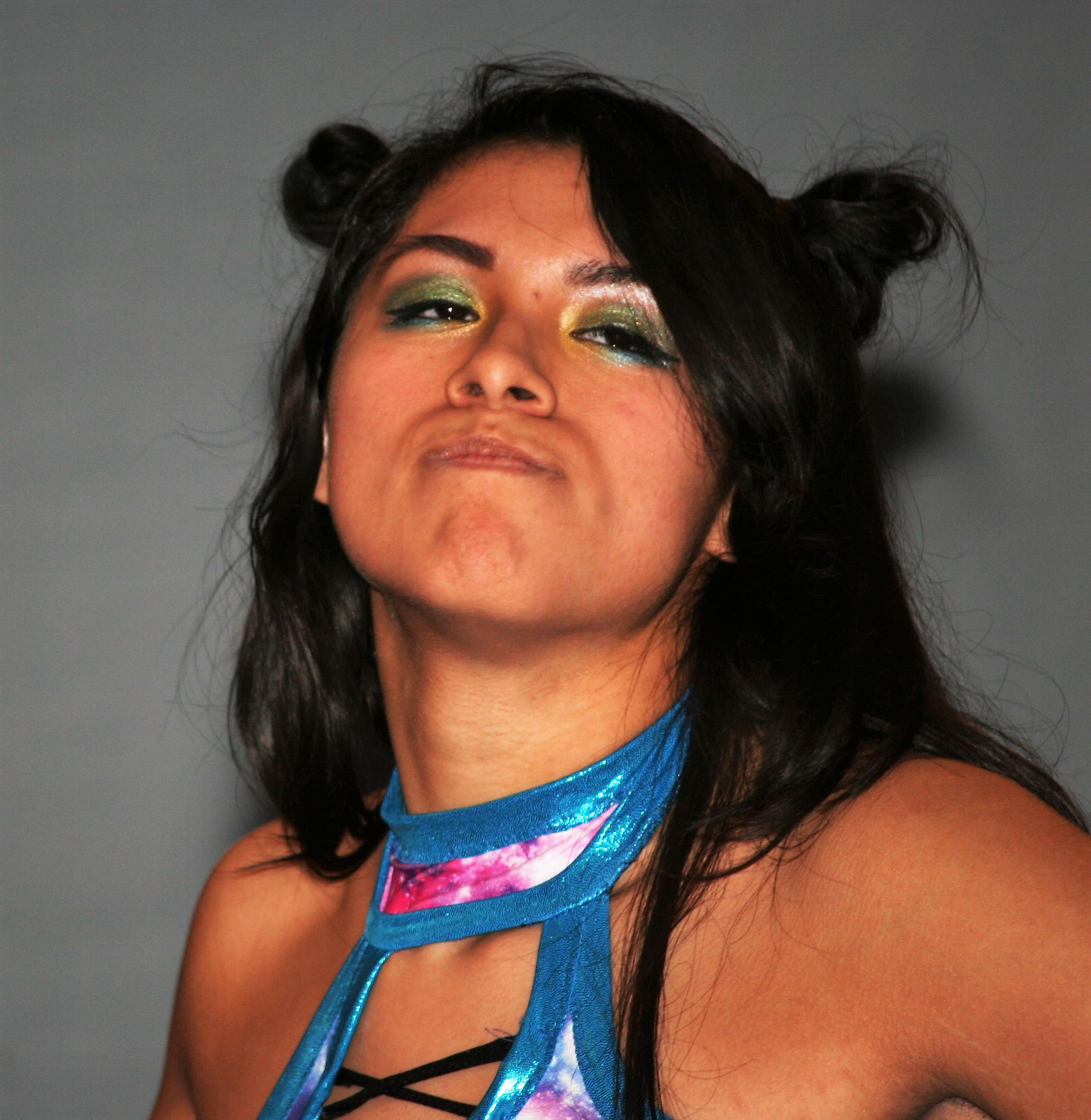

Personal information
- Born: Elizabeth Medrano; April 16, 1996 (age 30) Providence, Rhode Island, U.S.

Professional wrestling career
- Ring name: Delmi Exo
- Billed height: 5 ft 7 in (170 cm)
- Billed weight: 134 lb (61 kg)
- Billed from: Easthampton, Massachusetts
- Trained by: Doug Summers
- Debut: May 2, 2015

Elizabeth Medrano (born April 16, 1996), known under the ring name Delmi Exo, is an American professional wrestler and promoter. She currently performs on the independent circuit – predominantly for Pro Wrestling Grind, where she also serves as the co-owner. She is best known for her tenure in Major League Wrestling (MLW) where she was a record-setting two-time MLW Women's Featherweight Champion.

== Professional wrestling career ==
=== Independent circuit (2015–present) ===
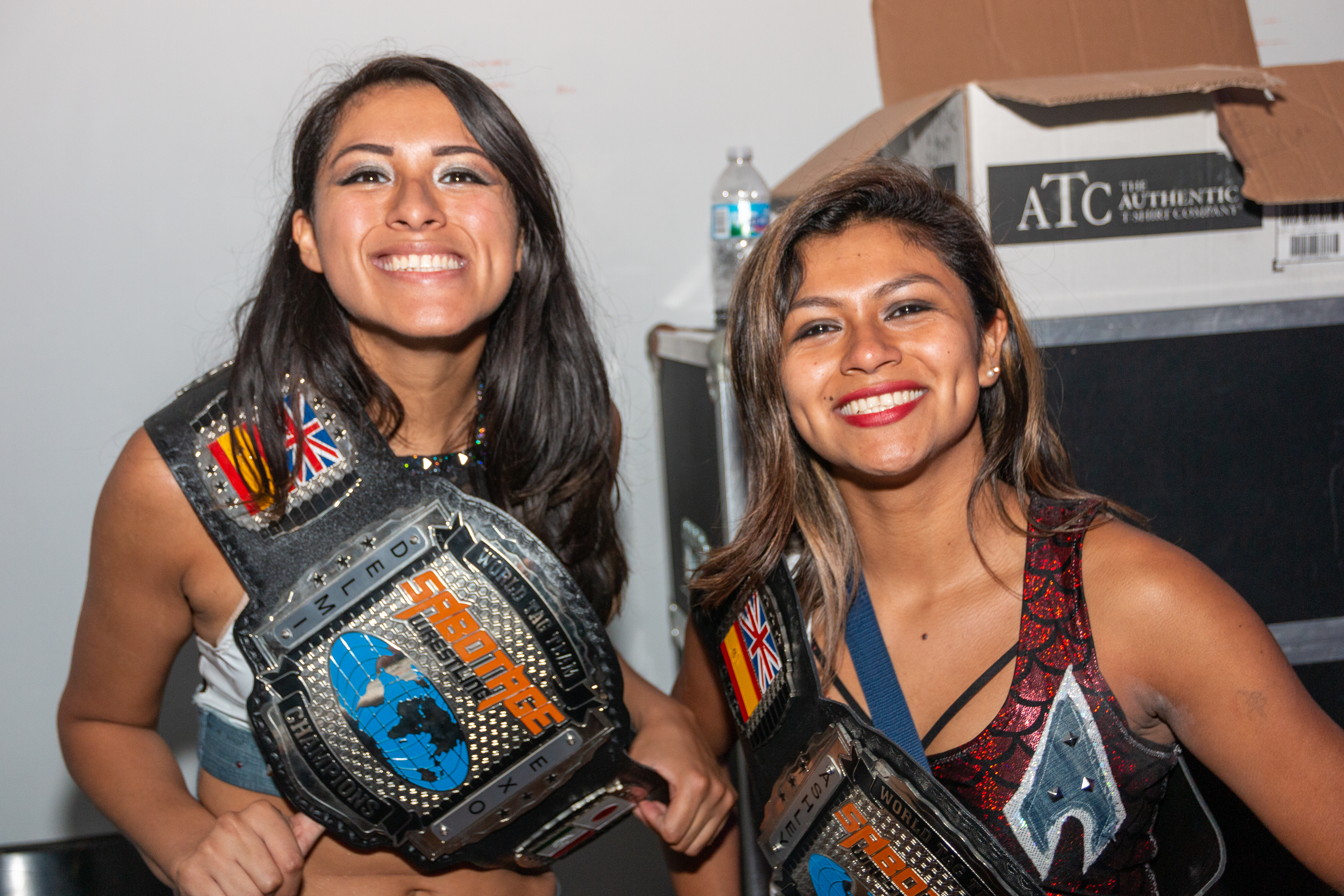
Exo alongside her sister and tag-team partner Ashley Vox in 2019

Exo and Vox began competing in Shimmer Women Athletes in 2019 where they won and became the Shimmer Tag Team Champions by defeating Cheerleader Melissa and Mercedes Martinez on November 2, 2019 at Volume 115. She alongside Ashley Vox also had the longest reign as Shimmer Tag Team Champion in history at 730 days during her first (and only) reign.

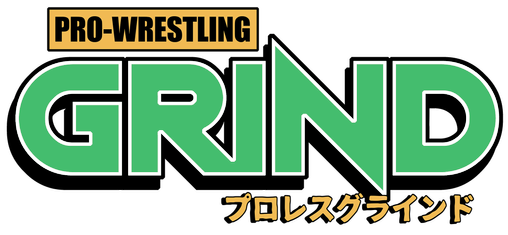
Logo of Pro Wrestling Grind

In 2021 Exo became one of the promoters of Pro Wrestling Grind, a promotion based in Easthampton, Massachusetts.

=== Impact Wrestling (2020) ===
Exo and Vox joined Impact Wrestling in 2020 to compete for the revived Knockouts Tag Team Championship in the 2020 revival tournament but we're not successful as they lost to Fire 'N Flava in the first round. On December 12, at Final Resolution, they fought Havok and Nevaeh in a losing effort.

=== Major League Wrestling (2021–2025) ===
On September 22, 2021, episode of Fusion: Alpha, MLW officially announced the launch of its MLW women's featherweight division and Exo and Vox were introduced as amongst the first female wrestlers in the division. On April 6, 2023, at War Chamber, Exo won the MLW World Women's Featherweight Championship by defeating the inaugural champion Taya Valkyrie. At Slaughterhouse on October 14, Exo lost the Women's Featherweight title to Janai Kai. On June 14, 2025 Exo announced her departure from MLW.

=== Ring of Honor (2021) ===
On the December 22nd, 2021 episode of ROH Women's division wednesday's Delmi made her ROH Women of Honor debut against Max the Impaler but was not successful as the Impaler pinned Delmi after using her finisher. (Amy Rose was in Max the Impaler's corner and Ashley Vox came to Delmi's comfort after the match and then the two as The Sea Stars had a tag team match against Angelina Love & Mandy Leon immediately after the two confronted The Sea Stars with a speech but were not successful against Love & Leon.)

== Championships and accomplishments ==
- Battle Club Pro
  - BCP Tag Team Championship (1 time, inaugural) – with Ashley Vox
  - BCP Tag Team Title Tournament (2020) - with Ashley Vox
- Immortal Championship Wrestling
  - ICW Women's Championship (1 time, current)
- Major League Wrestling
  - MLW World Women's Featherweight Championship (2 times)
- Next Wrestling Entertainment
  - NWE Women's Championship (1 time, inaugural)
  - NWE Women's Title Tournament (2017)
- Pro Wrestling Illustrated
  - Ranked No. 62 of the top 250 female singles wrestlers in the PWI Women's 250 in 2023
  - Ranked No. 314 of the top 500 singles wrestlers in the PWI 500 in 2021
- Sabotage Wrestling
  - Sabotage Tag Team Championship (1 time) – with Ashley Vox
- Shimmer Women Athletes
  - Shimmer Tag Team Championship (1 time, final) – with Ashley Vox
- Women's Superstars United
  - WSU Tag Team Championship (1 time, final) – with Kasey Catal
- Westside Xtreme Wrestling
  - wXw Women's Championship (1 time)
