= Under Siege (2025) =

TNA professional wrestling event

- Promotion: Total Nonstop Action Wrestling
- Date: May 23, 2025
- City: Brampton, Ontario, Canada
- Venue: CAA Centre

TNA+ Monthly Specials chronology
| ← Previous; Unbreakable | Next → Against All Odds |

Under Siege chronology
| ← Previous; 2024 | Next → Last |

The 2025 Under Siege was a professional wrestling event produced by Total Nonstop Action Wrestling. It took place on May 23, 2025, at the CAA Centre in Brampton, Ontario, Canada. It was the fifth event under the Under Siege chronology. Wrestlers from WWE's NXT brand, with which TNA has a partnership, also appeared at the event.

Ten matches were contested at the event, including one on the Countdown to Under Siege pre-show. In the main event, TNA World Champion Joe Hendry and Elijah defeated NXT wrestler Trick Williams and Frankie Kazarian. The event was notable for the return of Raj Singh to TNA.

== Production ==
=== Background ===
Under Siege is a professional wrestling event held by Total Nonstop Action Wrestling. It is annually held during the month of May, and the first event was held in 2021. On March 27, 2025, TNA announced that Under Siege would take place on May 23, 2025, at the CAA Centre in Brampton, Ontario, Canada.

=== Storylines ===
The event will feature several professional wrestling matches that involved different wrestlers from pre-existing scripted feuds, plots, and storylines. Wrestlers portray heroes, villains, or less distinguishable characters in scripted events that build tension and culminate in a wrestling match or series of matches. Storylines are produced on TNA's weekly programs, Impact! and Xplosion, as well as WWE's weekly television program, NXT, following WWE and TNA signing a multi-year partnership in January 2025.

On the April 22 episode of NXT, TNA World Champion Joe Hendry interrupted a segment between NXT Champion Oba Femi and Trick Williams, trying to stake a claim to Femi's title. Williams took exception to Hendry's comments and mocked him for his quick defeat against Randy Orton at WrestleMania 41, stating he was "first in line" for the title while telling Hendry he "didn't belong" in NXT. Hendry fired back at Williams' constant complaining before going eye-to-eye with Femi. Williams tried to intervene but was quickly dispatched by the two champions. Five days later at Rebellion, Hendry successfully defended the title against Call Your Shot Trophy holder Frankie Kazarian and NXT's Ethan Page in a three-way match, with Hendry pinning Page. However, following a brief celebration, Hendry was ambushed by Williams to close the show. On the next episode of NXT, Hendry appeared in the opening of the show, calling out Williams for his attack on him at Rebellion and being unable to hold himself accountable for not being NXT Champion. He challenged Williams to face him then and there, but was instead attacked by DarkState (Dion Lennox, Saquon Shugars, Cutler James, and Osiris Griffin). Williams would eventually appear in the second half of the show, disregarding Hendry as a viable threat and star. Two days later on a live episode of TNA Impact!, Hendry again called out Williams at the start of the show, but was met with a supposed satellite feed from the latter, who said he was preparing for a battle royal on next week's NXT to determine Femi's next challenger at Battleground. In the main event, Hendry teamed with The Hardys (Matt Hardy and Jeff Hardy) to face Kazarian and TNA World Tag Team Champions The Nemeths (Nic Nemeth and Ryan Nemeth). In the closing stages, Williams appeared and attacked Hendry, allowing Nic to pin Jeff to get the win for his team. The show concluded with Williams once again laying out Hendry. Following the show, TNA announced on their website that Hendry would team up with Elijah against Kazarian and Williams, making his TNA in-ring debut, at Under Siege.

At Unbreakable, TNA World Champion Joe Hendry and TNA Knockouts World Champion Masha Slamovich faced their respective Rebellion opponents, Frankie Kazarian and Tessa Blanchard, in a mixed tag team match. During the match, Slamovich was briefly distracted by Victoria Crawford (formerly Alicia Fox in WWE), who sat in the front row. Hendry and Slamovich would still win the match regardless. At Rebellion, Slamovich defeated Blanchard via submission to retain her title. Two weeks later on the May 1 TNA Impact!, Crawford, alongside NXT Assistant General Manager Robert Stone (formerly Robbie E in TNA), interrupted a segment between TNA Director of Authority Santino Marella and Cody Deaner. Stone claimed that Marella's performance in leadership was "under review" by the Anthem Sports & Entertainment board of directors, with Stone acting as liaison between TNA and Anthem, and that for now, Crawford would serve as TNA's "Deputy" Director of Authority. Stone also announced that Crawford would challenge Slamovich for the TNA Knockouts World Championship at Under Siege.

On the April 17 episode of TNA Impact!, Cody Deaner came to Santino Marella for help, as his contract with TNA would be expiring on May 1, and he asked Marella to make a case to the Anthem Sports & Entertainment board of directors to renew it. Marella stated that the board looked heavily at wrestlers' win-loss records, which in Deaner's case had been poor throughout his current deal. Two weeks later on TNA Impact!, Deaner addressed the fans in an apparent farewell promo as his contract would expire at midnight. Luckily for him, Marella came out to announce that Anthem had granted Deaner a short-term extension until Under Siege. There, Deaner would face Eddie Edwards of The System with the stipulation that if Deaner won, he would receive a new contract with TNA.

At Rebellion, The Nemeth Brothers (Nic Nemeth and Ryan Nemeth) defeated The Hardys (Jeff Hardy and Matt Hardy) to win the TNA World Tag Team Championship. Two weeks later on the May 8 episode of TNA Impact, The Nemeth Brothers mockingly offered to give The Hardys a rematch at Under Siege, knowing Jeff would be unable to travel to Canada due to past legal issues. However, Santino Marella announced that The Nemeth Brothers would still defend their titles at Under Siege, defending against Matt and a partner of his choosing. On May 14, TNA announced that Leon Slater would be Matt's partner at Under Siege.

At Sacrifice, Ash by Elegance and Heather by Elegance defeated Spitfire (Dani Luna and Jody Threat) to win the TNA Knockouts World Tag Team Championship, with the aid of their manager The Personal Concierge, in a handicap match. Since then, Spitfire had tried to invoke their clause for a one-on-one rematch, but were briefly hampered by the intrusion of NXT's Gigi Dolin and Tatum Paxley, and The Meta-Four (Lash Legend and Jakara Jackson). This led to a four-way tag team match for the titles at Rebellion, with Ash and Heather ultimately retaining. On the May 15 episode of TNA Impact!, it was announced that Spitfire would have their rematch against Ash and Heather for the TNA Knockouts World Tag Team Championship at Under Siege. Six days later, a video posted on TNA's social media saw Spitfire declaring they would disband as a team should they fail to win the titles. The following day on TNA Impact!, it was announced that the match at Under Siege would be contested as a "Match by Elegance."

For the past two months, Rosemary and Xia Brookside were involved in a rivalry stemming from a match between the two on the March 13 episode of TNA Impact!. There, Rosemary was disqualified after spitting green mist into Brookside's face. This shook-up Brookside's confidence as she became conflicted whether to keep to her babyface wrestling abilities. Rosemary would appear and challenge her to a tag team match later that night, where Brookside and Léi Yǐng Lee defeated Rosemary and Savannah Evans. For next few weeks, Rosemary continued to tempt Brookside into embracing her darker side, even helping her and Lee when they battled NXT's Fatal Influence (Fallon Henley, Jacy Jayne, and Jazmyn Nyx) throughout April. This led to a six-woman tag team match on the Countdown to Rebellion pre-show, which Fatal Influence won due to miscommunication from the TNA representatives. Two weeks later on TNA Impact!, Rosemary and Lee faced off in a match, with Brookside stationed at commentary. Towards the end, Rosemary tried to hit Lee with brass knuckles, but an intervention from Brookside allowed Lee to win the match. The following week, Rosemary and Brookside had a rematch of their previous encounter, where this time Brookside was disqualified when, after Rosemary's constant cheating and tempting, she snapped on Rosemary while inadvertently attacking the referee. On the May 22 episode, Rosemary again called out Brookside to be more vicious while, as a "motivator," she revealed to have attacked Lee. A fed-up Brookside would challenge Rosemary to one more match, which was announced for the Countdown to Under Siege pre-show.

==== Canceled match ====
On the May 15 episode of TNA Impact!, Matt Cardona defeated Elijah, Ace Austin, and Mance Warner to earn a TNA International Championship match at Under Siege. However, the following week, TNA announced that champion Steve Maclin was medically unable to compete at the event. Cardona tried to have the title relinquished to him, but Santino Marella instead rescheduled the match to the following episode of TNA Impact!.

== Results ==
| No. | Results | Stipulations | Times |
|---|---|---|---|
| 1^{P} | Rosemary defeated Xia Brookside by disqualification | Singles match | 8:35 |
| 2 | Mike Santana defeated KC Navarro (with A. J. Francis) by pinfall | Singles match | 9:49 |
| 3 | Eddie Edwards (with Alisha Edwards) defeated Cody Deaner by pinfall | Singles match Since Deaner lost, he was forced to leave TNA. | 10:32 |
| 4 | The Northern Armory (Eric Young, Judas Icarus and Travis Williams) defeated The System (Moose, Brian Myers and JDC) (with Eddie Edwards and Alisha Edwards) by pinfall | Six-man tag team match | 12:06 |
| 5 | Ash by Elegance and Heather by Elegance (c) (with The Personal Concierge) defeated Spitfire (Dani Luna and Jody Threat) by pinfall | Match by Elegance for the TNA Knockouts World Tag Team Championship; Since Spitfire lost, they were forced to disband. | 12:12 |
| 6 | Order 4 (Mustafa Ali, Tasha Steelz, and The Great Hands (John Skylar and Jason Hotch)) defeated Raj Singh, Indi Hartwell, and The Rascalz (Trey Miguel and Zachary Wentz) by pinfall | Eight-person mixed tag team match | 9:55 |
| 7 | Tessa Blanchard defeated Arianna Grace by pinfall | Singles match | 8:07 |
| 8 | Masha Slamovich (c) defeated Victoria Crawford (with Sheriff Stone) by pinfall | Singles match for the TNA Knockouts World Championship | 6:54 |
| 9 | The Nemeth Brothers (Nic Nemeth and Ryan Nemeth) (c) defeated Matt Hardy and Leon Slater by pinfall | Tag team match for the TNA World Tag Team Championship | 16:05 |
| 10 | Joe Hendry and Elijah defeated Trick Williams and Frankie Kazarian by pinfall | Tag team match | 19:21 |
(c) / – the champion(s) heading into the match; P / – the match was broadcast on the pre-show
