= Under Siege (2022) =

2022 Impact Wrestling event

- Promotional poster
- Promotion: Impact Wrestling
- Date: May 7, 2022
- City: Newport, Kentucky
- Venue: Promowest Pavilion at Ovation

Impact Plus Monthly Specials chronology
← Previous; Sacrifice	Next → Against All Odds

Under Siege chronology
← Previous; 2021	Next → 2023

The 2022 Under Siege was a professional wrestling event produced by Impact Wrestling. It took place on May 7, 2022, at Promowest Pavilion at Ovation in Newport, Kentucky, and aired on Impact Plus and YouTube. It was the second event in the Under Siege chronology. The event featured wrestlers from partner promotions New Japan Pro-Wrestling (NJPW) and Lucha Libre AAA Worldwide (AAA).

Eleven matches were contested at the event, including two on the pre-show and one taped as a digital exclusive. In the main event, Josh Alexander defeated Tomohiro Ishii to retain the Impact World Championship. In other prominent matches, The Briscoes (Jay Briscoe and Mark Briscoe) defeated Violent By Design (Eric Young and Deaner) to win the Impact World Tag Team Championship, and Ace Austin and Tasha Steelz retained the X Division and Knockouts World Championships respectively, with Austin defeating Trey Miguel, and Steelz defeating Havok. The event also marked the return of Mia Yim (formerly known as Jade) and the return from injury by Sami Callihan to confront Moose.

== Production ==
=== Background ===
Under Siege is a professional wrestling event held by Impact Wrestling. It is annually held during the month of May, and the first event was held in 2021. On March 25, 2022, Impact Wrestling announced that Under Siege would take place on May 7, 2022, in Newport, Kentucky.

=== Storylines ===
The event featured several professional wrestling matches that involved different wrestlers from pre-existing scripted feuds, plots, and storylines. Wrestlers portrayed heroes, villains, or less distinguishable characters in scripted events that build tension and culminate in a wrestling match or series of matches. Storylines were produced on Impact's weekly television program.

At Rebellion, Josh Alexander defeated Moose to regain the Impact World Championship, after Moose used his Call Your Shot Trophy to win the title from Alexander at Bound for Glory in October 2021. On the Impact! following Rebellion, Impact Executive Vice President Scott D'Amore announced that a winner from Rebellion will be the next challenger to the title at Under Siege. After Alexander defeated Moose in a rematch, it was revealed that Tomohiro Ishii, who defeated Jonah at Rebellion, will be Alexander's opponent at Under Siege. On the May 5 episode of Impact!, Ishii would defeat Steve Maclin while Alexander watched from the back.

At Rebellion, Violent By Design (represented by Eric Young and Joe Doering) successfully defended the Impact World Tag Team Championship in an Eight-Team Elimination Challenge, entering in the final position and last eliminating Heath and Rhino to win. On the subsequent episode of Impact!, Heath and Rhino confronted VBD in the ring, before being joined by the debuting The Briscoes (Jay Briscoe and Mark Briscoe). After exchanging words with each other, The Briscoes defeated Heath and Rhino in a match, earning them a title opportunity against VBD at Under Siege. The two teams would taunt each other on promos during the May 5 episode of Impact!.

At Rebellion, Taya Valkyrie, wrestling her first match for Impact in over a year, defeated Deonna Purrazzo to win her record-tying fourth AAA Reina de Reinas Championship. On the subsequent episode of Impact!, while Valkyrie was cutting an in-ring promo, she would be attacked from behind by Purrazzo, before the company announced that the latter would have her rematch for the title against the former at Under Siege.

On the March 24 episode of Impact!, Violent By Design retained the Impact World Tag Team Championship against The Good Brothers (Doc Gallows and Karl Anderson) in a lumberjack match following interference from Honor No More's Matt Taven and Mike Bennett. This led to a faction rivalry between Honor No More and Bullet Club, with the latter (Jay White, Chris Bey, and The Good Brothers) defeating the former (Taven, Bennett, Kenny King, and Vincent) in an eight-man tag team match on the April 21 episode of Impact!. At Rebellion, during the Eight-Team Elimination Challenge, Taven and Bennett, with help from the rest of Honor No More, eliminated The Good Brothers from the match. On the April 28 episode of Impact!, Eddie Edwards, Taven and Bennett would defeat Mike Bailey and The Motor City Machine Guns. After the match, Bullet Club would brawl with Honor No More and later it was announced that Bullet Club (Bey, White, The Good Brothers, and El Phantasmo) will face Honor No More (Edwards, Taven, Bennett, King, and Vincent) in a 10-man tag team match at Under Siege. On the May 5 episode of Impact!, White and Bey would defeat Rich Swann and Willie Mack. After the match, Honor No More would storm the ring leading to another brawl with Bullet Club.

At Rebellion, Tasha Steelz retained the Impact Knockouts World Championship against Rosemary. During the match, Steelz tricked the referee into ejecting Rosemary's Decay teammate Havok, allowing Steelz's ally Savannah Evans the opportunity to interfere herself. On the subsequent episode of Impact!, Havok and Rosemary defeated Steelz and Evans in a tag team match, with Havok getting the pin on Evans. Later that night, Impact announced that Havok will now challenge Steelz for the Knockouts World Championship at Under Siege. On the May 5 episode of Impact!, Decay would abduct Evans from the backstage area which would force Steelz to not have backup at Under Siege.

At Multiverse of Matches, Chris Sabin defeated Jay White, marking the latter's first pinfall loss in the company. However, Steve Maclin would attack Sabin afterwards, before the latter would be dealt a low blow by White. At Rebellion, Maclin pinned Sabin in a three-way match also involving White. On the April 28 episode of Impact!, Maclin would approach Scott D'Amore wanting the World title match at Under Siege. D'Amore would deny him because he already had a match for that show and also gave him a match next week against Tomohiro Ishii. On May 2, Impact announced that Sabin and Maclin will face off in singles competition at Under Siege. On the May 5 episode of Impact!, Ishii would defeat Maclin.

At Multiverse of Matches, The Influence (Madison Rayne and Tenille Dashwood) successfully retained the Impact Knockouts World Tag Team Championship in a four-way tag team match against Decay (Havok and Rosemary), Gisele Shaw and Lady Frost, and Savannah Evans and Impact Knockouts World Champion Tasha Steelz. There, Rayne pinned Shaw to retain the titles. Two weeks later on the April 14 episode of Impact!, Shaw confronted Rayne after The Influence had fired their photographer Kaleb with a K, wondering if they could be successful without him. On the Impact! following Rebellion, The Influence attempted to host an episode of Dashwood's talk show, "All About Me", only to once again be interrupted by Shaw. After an argument, a match between Shaw and Dashwood was made for the next week. On the May 5 episode of Before the Impact, Dashwood would defeat Shaw after Rayne interfered. Later, Alisha Edwards would offer to help Shaw against The Influence. Impact would later announce that Shaw will face off against Rayne on the Countdown to Under Siege pre-show. After the Shelley and Bailey match was cancelled, this match would then take place on the main show.

At Rebellion, Ace Austin won the Impact X Division Championship by defeating Mike Bailey and defending champion Trey Miguel in a three-way match. On the April 28 episode of Impact!, during a backstage promo where Austin gloated about his victory, Rocky Romero would offer him a chance at Best of the Super Juniors. Austin would arrogantly accept which offended Romero who challenged him to a title match the next week. On the May 5 episode of Impact!, after Austin retained the title over Romero, Miguel would attack Austin till he fled the ring. Miguel would then invoke his rematch clause against Austin for Under Siege.

==== Canceled match ====
At Multiverse of Matches, Mike Bailey defeated Alex Shelley, which has since cause some tension between the two, as evident after a six-man tag team match with them and Chris Sabin in a losing effort to Honor No More (Eddie Edwards, Matt Taven, and Mike Bennett) on the April 28 episode of Impact!. On May 3, it was announced that Shelley and Bailey will have a rematch from Multiverse of Matches at Under Siege. However, Shelley was unable to make the event, so Bailey was entered into the Countdown to Under Siege match between Laredo Kid and Rich Swann, making it a three-way match.

== Results ==
No.	Results	Stipulations	Times
1^{D}	W. Morrissey, Jordynne Grace, and Shark Boy defeated Johnny Swinger, Zicky Dice, and Shogun by pinfall (Note: The match was taped for an Impact Digital Exclusive that aired on May 10.)	Six-person tag team match	6:01
2^{P}	Heath and Rhino defeated Raj Singh and Shera by pinfall	Tag team match	6:30
3^{P}	Rich Swann defeated Laredo Kid and Mike Bailey by pinfall	X Division Three-way match	7:57
4	Gisele Shaw (with Alisha Edwards) defeated Madison Rayne (with Tenille Dashwood) by pinfall	Singles match	7:16
5	Chris Sabin defeated Steve Maclin by pinfall	Singles match	13:23
6	Taya Valkyrie (c) defeated Deonna Purrazzo by pinfall	Singles match for the AAA Reina de Reinas Championship	10:09
7	Ace Austin (c) defeated Trey Miguel by pinfall	Singles match for the Impact X Division Championship	13:04
8	Honor No More (Eddie Edwards, Kenny King, Matt Taven, Mike Bennett, and Vincent) (with Maria Kanellis-Bennett) defeated Bullet Club (Jay White, Chris Bey, Doc Gallows, El Phantasmo, and Karl Anderson) by pinfall	10-man tag team match	18:21
9	Tasha Steelz (c) defeated Havok by pinfall	Singles match for the Impact Knockouts World Championship	10:26
10	The Briscoes (Jay Briscoe and Mark Briscoe) defeated Violent By Design (Eric Young and Deaner) (with Joe Doering) (c) by pinfall	Tag team match for the Impact World Tag Team Championship	11:17
11	Josh Alexander (c) defeated Tomohiro Ishii by pinfall	Singles match for the Impact World Championship	23:32
(c) / – the champion(s) heading into the match; D / – this was a dark match; P / – the match was broadcast on the pre-show
