= Under Siege (2021) =

2021 Impact Wrestling event

- Promotional poster
- Promotion: Impact Wrestling
- Date: May 15, 2021
- City: Nashville, Tennessee
- Venue: Skyway Studios
- Attendance: 0 (behind closed doors) (Note: The event was held without a paying audience due to the COVID-19 pandemic in the United States.)

Impact Plus Monthly Specials chronology
← Previous; Hardcore Justice	Next → Against All Odds

Under Siege chronology
← Previous; First	Next → 2022

The 2021 Under Siege was a professional wrestling event produced by Impact Wrestling. It took place on May 15, 2021 at the Skyway Studios in Nashville, Tennessee, and aired exclusively on Impact Plus. It was the first event in the Under Siege chronology. The event featured wrestlers from partner promotions All Elite Wrestling (AEW) and New Japan Pro-Wrestling (NJPW).

Nine matches were contested at the event. In the main event, Moose won a six-way match to become the number one contender for the Impact World Championship. In other prominent matches, Fire 'N Flava (Kiera Hogan and Tasha Steelz) defeated Jordynne Grace and Rachael Ellering to win the Impact Knockouts Tag Team Championship, and Josh Alexander and Deonna Purrazzo retained the Impact X Division and Impact Knockouts Championships respectively, with Alexander defeating El Phantasmo, and Purrazzo defeating Havok.

The event garnered positive reviews from critics, with much praise being directed to the X Division title match between El Phantasmo and Josh Alexander.

== Production ==
=== Background ===
On April 25, 2021, at Rebellion, it was announced by Impact Wrestling that Under Siege would take place on May 15, 2021 at the Skyway Studios in Nashville, Tennessee.

=== Storylines ===
The event featured professional wrestling matches that involved different wrestlers from pre-existing scripted feuds and storylines. Storylines were produced on Impact's weekly television program.

At Rebellion, All Elite Wrestling (AEW) wrestler Kenny Omega defeated Rich Swann in a Title vs. Title match to retain the AEW World Championship and win Swann's Impact World Championship. Later, it was announced that Omega would compete at Under Siege. On the Impact! following Rebellion, Omega and The Good Brothers (Doc Gallows and Karl Anderson) came out to interrupt a qualifying match between Eddie Edwards and Sami Callihan, costing Edwards a place in the number one contender's match. Impact World Tag Team Champions FinJuice (David Finlay and Juice Robinson) attempted a save, but were struck down by Omega and The Good Brothers. It was later announced that Edwards and FinJuice would battle Omega and The Good Brothers in a six-man tag team match.

On the Impact! following Rebellion, Impact Executive Vice President Scott D'Amore announced a six-way match to determine the new number one contender for the Impact World Championship (since the clauses of the Rebellion main event stated that match was one time only and there would be no rematch). There was also the possibility of the match straight up being for the title if Kenny Omega did not show up in-person for his championship celebration (which he did). Six qualifying matches would be held to determine the six participants at Under Siege. Chris Bey, Matt Cardona, and Sami Callihan qualified for the match by defeating Jake Something, Brian Myers, and Eddie Edwards, respectively. On the May 6 episode of Impact!, Chris Sabin, Trey Miguel, and Moose also qualified for the match by defeating Rhino, Rohit Raju, and James Storm, respectively, to complete the field.

At Rebellion, Jordynne Grace and Rachael Ellering defeated Fire 'N Flava (Kiera Hogan and Tasha Steelz) to become the new Impact Knockouts Tag Team Champions. On the April 29 episode of Impact!, it was announced that Fire N Flava, after an exchange of words with the new champions, would receive their rematch for the titles at Under Siege.

W. Morrissey, formerly known in WWE as Big Cass, made his Impact debut at Rebellion, replacing Eric Young in Violent By Design's match against Chris Sabin, Eddie Edwards, James Storm, and Willie Mack. Morrissey took an exceptional interest in hurting Mack, and would get the win for his team by pinning him. On the April 29 episode of Impact!, Morrissey had his singles debut, defeating Sam Beale. Beforehand, Morrissey cut a promo saying to the fans that, while he is recognizable physically, he is not the same man they once saw before. Later that night, Mack challenged Morrissey to a match at Under Siege, which Morrissey accepted the next week, stating he wanted Mack to physically suffer through what he went through mentally over the past couple years due to fan disconnect.

At Rebellion, Brian Myers defeated his former friend Matt Cardona, before Cardona bested him in a rematch on the subsequent Impact!, earning Cardona a place in the number one contender's match at Under Siege. The following week on Impact!, Myers threw a fit backstage, feeling that his win at Rebellion already earned him a spot in the match. It was then that he encountered Rosemary, who gave Myers a tarot card reading and blamed his inability to change on his ego. Myers dismissed the telling before being hit with a headbutt by Black Taurus, setting up a match between the two at the event.

On the Countdown to the Rebellion pre-show, Havok and Rosemary defeated Kimber Lee and Susan (subordinates of Impact Knockouts Champion Deonna Purrazzo). Later that week on Impact!, Purrazzo was about to leave the interview area before being confronted by Havok. The following episode in another interview, Rosemary would confront Purrazzo, Lee, and Susan before Havok showed up again. The champion proposed a number one contender's match between the two adversaries for May 13 episode of Impact!, with the winner facing Purrazzo at Under Siege. On the May 13 episode of Impact!, Havok defeated Rosemary to become the number one contender for the title.

On the May 6 episode of Impact!, it was announced that there will be an X-Division Scramble the following week, where the winner faces Impact X Division Champion Josh Alexander at Under Siege. Former champions Ace Austin, Petey Williams, Rohit Raju, and TJP, as well as Acey Romero and New Japan Pro-Wrestling (NJPW) talent El Phantasmo were named as participants. The following week on Impact!, El Phantasmo won the match to become the number one contender for the title.

== Event ==
Other on-screen personnel
Commentators	Matt Striker
Commentators	D'Lo Brown
Ring announcer	David Penzer
Referees	Brian Hebner
Referees	Brandon Tolle
Referees	Daniel Spencer
Interviewer	Gia Miller

=== Preliminary matches ===
The opening match of the event was Brian Myers against Black Taurus (with Rosemary and Crazzy Steve). Taurus uses his strength to overpower Myers early, forcing him to go outside and punch Steve that lures Taurus in to get attacked. After landing a suplex, Myers cuts off Taurus' comeback by tripping him and continuing the offense. Taurus regains the advantage by climbing the ropes to hit a twisting crossbody on Myers, and plants him with a crucifix bomb and a shoulderbreaker for a pair of two counts. Myers catches Taurus with a kick and a flatliner for a near fall, heads to the top rope but gets caught by Taurus, only for Myers to thumb his eye and hit the "Roster Cut" for the victory.

Next, a knockouts tag team match was contested between Taylor Wilde and Tenille Dashwood (with Kaleb with a K) versus Kimber Lee and Susan. Wilde and Dashwood get the early advantage in the match, with the latter hitting Lee with a neckbreaker over the ropes, but gets tripped on the ring apron by Susan and allows Lee to apply kicks to Dashwood for a two count. Wilde gets the tag and lays some offense on Susan, getting the fisherman suplex on her but Lee breaks up the count. Susan hits the superplex on Wilde but gets caught pinning her while using the ropes. Wilde gets a small package on Susan while she's distracted but Lee breaks it up. Kaleb hits Susan with a shoe without Wilde noticing, and she lands the German suplex to get the pinfall for her team. Dashwood and Kaleb celebrate the victory with Wilde who was hesitant, and she left the ring as they continued.

The third match involved Ace Austin and Madman Fulton, XXXL (Acey Romero and Larry D), Rohit Rahu and Shera, and TJP and Petey Williams in a four-way tag team match to determine the number one contender for the Impact World Tag Team Championship. The wrestlers brawl as the bell rings, with Fulton and Larry D laying fists on each other before Romero tags in to continue the assault on the former. Raju tags in to punch Romero who delivers a slap in return, but gets tagged by Williams who double teams on Raju with TJP. Shera and Raju regain the assault but the latter gets blind tagged by Austin, who trades offense on TJP with Fulton to keep their advantage. After hitting a tornado DDT on Austin, TJP makes the tag to Williams, and has Austin set up for the "Canadian Destroyer" but gets interrupted by Fulton. Romero enters the ring to send Fulton on the outside, allowing him and Larry D to double team on both Austin and Williams. Raju tags himself in and attacks Austin, but gets squashed by XXXL before they turn their attention on Austin. Fulton breaks up the pin attempt, clotheslines Romero and slams Larry D to the ground, allowing Austin to hit the splash for the win.

The fourth match was contested between W. Morrissey and Willie Mack. Mack immediately goes after Morrissey at the bell with some punches, but gets shoulder tackled to the mat afterwards. Mack comes back with strikes and forearms that send Morrissey to the floor, and they continue to batter each other on the outside. Back in the ring, Morrissey applies a chin lock on Mack, all while landing elbows and choking him on the ropes. Mack fights back and hits a top rope clothesline on Morrissey. Morrissey plants Mack with a slam and kicks him in back of the head for the win. After the match, Morrissey continues to land blows on Mack before going outside to grab a chair, but is stopped by a returning Rich Swann who sends him over the top rope.

The fifth match saw Jordynne Grace and Rachael Ellering defend the Knockouts Tag Team Championship against Fire 'N Flava (Kiera Hogan and Tasha Steelz). The champions overpower Hogan early in the match, with Grace hitting three gutwrench suplexes and Ellering landing a senton on her. Fire 'N Flava regain control by making quick tags and utilize double team maneuvers on Ellering to keep her from tagging Grace. Ellering makes the tag to Grace and both of them use tandem offense on Steelz. All four wrestlers are in the ring and take each other out with signature moves. Grace and Steelz fight each other in the ring, with the former setting up for a Vader bomb, but was stopped by Hogan. On the outside, Hogan takes out Ellering with a Sliced Bread No. 2. Grace and Steelz battle on the top rope, the latter knocking out the former to the mat and hitting a frog splash for the pin, making Fire 'N Flava the new Knockouts Tag Team Champions for a second time.

The sixth match was Josh Alexander defending the X Division Championship against El Phantasmo. Alexander outwrestles Phantasmo in the beginning of the bout, but the latter manages to land a jumping knee and grab him in a front facelock. Alexander catches Phantasmo with a powerslam and plants a chop that forces him to escape to the floor. Back in the ring, Phantasmo attempts an attack on Alexander but misses, leaving him open for a backbreaker but retakes control after that with a stomp on Alexander's foot. The two trade chops in the corner, with Phantasmo hanging Alexander on the ropes and standing on his crotch, before the latter suplexes him and rolls out of the ring. On the outside, Alexander misses a chop on Phantasmo and hits the ring post, allowing the former to work on the right hand in the ring. Phantasmo walks on three sides of the ring ropes before Alexander slams him off the top rope. After rolling up Alexander for a two count, Phantasmo hits him with a couple of moves, including a neckbreaker that only garners two. Alexander catches Phantasmo's kick and hits a backbreaker, then applies the ankle lock but gets sent to the turnbuckle, allowing Phantasmo to roll him up but kicks out at two. Alexander delivers a release German suplex on Phantasmo and hits him with a low crossbody to the floor. Phantasmo catches Alexander with a top-rope hurricanrana and lands a splash for a near fall. Alexander hits Phantasmo with a powerbomb backbreaker, applies the ankle lock to make him submit and retain the title.

The seventh match was Deonna Purrazzo (with Kimber Lee and Susan) defending the Impact Knockouts Championship against Havok. Havok dominates Purrazzo in the early goings, but a missed leg drop leaves her open for Purrazzo to work on the arm. Havok attempts multiple offensive comebacks but Purrazzo cuts them off and continues to attack the arm. Havok takes Purrazzo down with a clothesline, misses two stomps and gets hit with an elbow, but manages to apply the Boston crab before Purrazzo grabs the ropes. After taking Lee and Susan off the apron, Havok gets caught in Purrazzo's armbar, but wrenches free to hit her with a knee strike. Purrazzo takes out Havok with a kick, locks in the Fujiwara armbar to make her tap and retain the title.

In the penultimate match, a six-man tag team bout was contested between Eddie Edwards and FinJuice (David Finlay and Juice Robinson) against Kenny Omega and The Good Brothers (Doc Gallows and Karl Anderson) (with Don Callis). After Robinson hits a slam and senton on Anderson, he tags in Edwards and works on Anderson's arm. Omega tags himself in, trades blows with Edwards, but gets planted with an overhead belly-to-belly suplex. FinJuice deliver a tandem bulldog on Omega for two, Gallows trips and drags Robinson to the outside and gets taken out along with Anderson, but Omega lands a dropkick and pushes Robinson to the apron before bringing him back into the ring. Anderson gets taken out with a back suplex by Robinson, who makes the tag to Finlay, and manages to take out the entire team before his pinfall gets broken up by Omega. After Omega distracts Finlay by grabbing his leg from outside, Anderson sends him out of the ring, and Gallows works over him as he tags in. Finlay lands a crossbody on Gallows, escapes a suplex attempt by Anderson, and tags in Edwards who works on Omega with chops to his chest and a "Blue Thunder Bomb" for a two count. Omega gets a hurricanrana on Edwards as the Good Brothers send FinJuice off the apron, and all three begin to attack Edwards but FinJuice return to fight them off, allowing Edwards to hit a tiger driver on Omega for a near fall. As Robinson gets some jabs on Gallows, Omega hits him with a "V-Trigger", and gets a snap dragon suplex on Edwards. Omega and The Good Brothers land a triple team splash cover on Edwards that gets broken up by FinJuice, who also interrupt a "Magic Killer" attempt, and both Edwards and Robinson hit a double suplex on Gallows. Omega sends Robinson to the outside with a snap dragon, gets taken out by Edwards with a clothesline, who then gets planted with a TKO by Anderson, but he kicks out at two. FinJuice double team on Anderson before landing dives on the outside to Gallows and Omega respectively, allowing Edwards to hit the "Boston Knee Party" on Anderson for the win.

=== Main event ===
In the main event, a six-way match between Chris Bey, Chris Sabin, Matt Cardona, Moose, Sami Callihan, and Trey Miguel, was contested to determine the number one contender for the Impact World Championship. Moose immediately dominates early in the match, but gets knocked out by Bey and Sabin with double superkicks, leaving them in the ring to fight each other. After Miguel sends Bey outside with a kick, he tangles with Callihan who then gets taken out by Cardona, who manages to send Moose outside the ring. Bey and Miguel hit double dives on the outside, but the former gets powerbombed by Callihan on the apron and gets sent into the ring. Callihan has Cardona and Bey tied up in the ropes, but the latter manages to suplex them off the top rope, before getting a dropkick from Sabin. Miguel and Sabin battle it out before the former applies a dragon sleeper that gets broken up by Moose. After hitting dropkicks on Sabin and Bey, Moose lands a superplex on Miguel but gets hit with a splash by Bey, whose pin attempt gets interrupted after Callihan hits him with a steel chair. Callihan suplexes Bey onto the chair but his pinfall gets broken up by Cardona, who hits him with the Reboot for a two count. Sabin enters the ring and hits a DDT/Flatliner combo on Cardona and Callihan. Cardona gets the "Radio Silence" on Moose but gets hit with a low blow by Callihan looking for a piledriver, but The Good Brothers run down and drag Callihan outside to knock him out on the floor. Back in the ring, Sabin hits an enziguiri and a "Cradle Shock" on Cardona, but Moose pulls the referee out to stop the pin. Sabin lands a suicide dive on Moose and gets a sunset flip back in the ring for a near fall. Moose targets Sabin's knee and hits a spear for the win, becoming number one contender to the Impact World Championship.

== Reception ==
Darrin Lilly of PWTorch was positive towards the event, praising the X Division title bout, the six-man tag match and the six-way main event for being an "[A]ction packed match from beginning to end", concluding that: "From top to bottom, it was a really good show and a fun evening of entertainment. The Impact Plus specials really deliver. Impact continues to be really fun to watch and this show continued the momentum." Jack Irene of 411Mania reviewed the event and gave it a 7.5 out of 10. He wrote that: "This was a really good IMPACT Plus event with the marquee matches delivering at a high level. Nothing was offensive and the match quality and effort stood out. Good in-ring showings combined with strong story advancement made for one of the better IMPACT Plus shows you'll find." Bob Kapur of Slam Wrestling gave it 3.5 out of 5 stars. He wrote that: "[W]ith the tremendous match between Josh Alexander and El Phantasmo, and two really good title matches in the Knockouts Division, it's hard to be too critical of this show. While the main event was good, the focus on sideline stories took the spotlight away from Moose where it really should have shone. Other matches ranged from being okay to simply just being there."

== Aftermath ==
On the following episode of Impact!, FinJuice retained the Impact World Tag Team Championship against Ace Austin and Madman Fulton. After the match, Violent By Design arrived to invoke Rhino's Call Your Shot Gauntlet championship privilege, allowing him and Joe Doering to defeat FinJuice for the World Tag Team Championship.

On the May 27 episode of Impact!, W. Morrissey had a sit-down interview with Gia Miller, before Rich Swann jumped him from behind. The following week, Swann and Morrissey were scheduled for a match, only for Morrissey to jump Swann, this time before the bell rang. It was later announced that Swann and Morrissey would have their match at Against All Odds.

== Results ==
No.	Results	Stipulations	Times
1	Brian Myers defeated Black Taurus (with Crazzy Steve and Rosemary) by pinfall	Singles match	9:10
2	Taylor Wilde and Tenille Dashwood (with Kaleb with a K) defeated Kimber Lee and Susan by pinfall	Tag team match	4:27
3	Ace Austin and Madman Fulton defeated Petey Williams and TJP, XXXL (Acey Romero and Larry D), and Rohit Raju and Shera by pinfall	Four-way tag team match to determine the number one contender for the Impact World Tag Team Championship	13:52
4	W. Morrissey defeated Willie Mack by pinfall	Singles match	11:55
5	Fire 'N Flava (Kiera Hogan and Tasha Steelz) defeated Jordynne Grace and Rachael Ellering (c) by pinfall	Tag team match for the Impact Knockouts Tag Team Championship	12:37
6	Josh Alexander (c) defeated El Phantasmo by submission	Singles match for the Impact X Division Championship	16:44
7	Deonna Purrazzo (c) (with Kimber Lee and Susan) defeated Havok by submission	Singles match for the Impact Knockouts Championship	8:39
8	Eddie Edwards and FinJuice (David Finlay and Juice Robinson) defeated The Elite (Kenny Omega, Doc Gallows, and Karl Anderson) (with Don Callis) by pinfall	Six-man tag team match	19:57
9	Moose defeated Chris Bey, Chris Sabin, Matt Cardona, Sami Callihan, and Trey Miguel by pinfall	Six-way match to determine the number one contender for the Impact World Championship at Against All Odds	10:48
(c) / – the champion(s) heading into the match
