= Under Siege (2024) =

2024 TNA Wrestling event

- Promotion: Total Nonstop Action Wrestling
- Date: May 3, 2024
- City: Albany, New York
- Venue: Washington Avenue Armory

TNA+ Monthly Specials chronology
← Previous; Sacrifice	Next → Against All Odds

Under Siege chronology
← Previous; 2023	Next → 2025

The 2024 Under Siege was a professional wrestling event produced by Total Nonstop Action Wrestling. It took place on May 3, 2024, at the Washington Avenue Armory in Albany, New York and aired on TNA+. It was the fourth event under the Under Siege chronology.

Twelve matches were contested at the event, including three on the Countdown to Under Siege pre-show. In the main event, The System (Moose, Brian Myers and Eddie Edwards) defeated "Broken" Matt Hardy and Speedball Mountain (Trent Seven and Mike Bailey). In other prominent matches, Mustafa Ali defeated Ace Austin to retain the TNA X Division Championship, Jordynne Grace and PCO defeated Steph De Lander and Kon in a intergender tag team match, and Alisha Edwards and Masha Slamovich defeated Spitfire (Dani Luna and Jody Threat) to win the TNA Knockouts World Tag Team Championship.

== Production ==
=== Background ===
Under Siege is a professional wrestling event held by Total Nonstop Action Wrestling. The event is held annually during the month of May, and the first event was held in 2021. On March 7, 2024, Total Nonstop Action Wrestling announced that Under Siege would take place on May 3, 2024, at the Washington Avenue Armory in Albany, New York.

=== Storylines ===
The event will feature several professional wrestling matches, with results predetermined by TNA. Storylines are produced on the company's weekly programs, Impact! and Xplosion.

At Rebellion, The System (Brian Myers and Eddie Edwards) successfully defended the TNA World Tag Team Championship against Speedball Mountain (Trent Seven and Mike Bailey), while in the main event, System member Moose retained the TNA World Championship over Nic Nemeth. The System was set to celebrate at the end of the show, only for the lights to go out. When they came back on, "Broken" Matt Hardy, making his full-time return to TNA in over 7 years, appeared and attacked The System. On the subsequent episode of TNA Impact, Nemeth and Hardy would declare "war" on The System, with Nemeth taking on Edwards later in the night. TNA also announced that The System will face Nemeth and Speedball Mountain in a six-man tag team match at Under Siege. However, after Edwards defeated Nemeth on that night's main event, The System ambushed Nemeth with a chair shot to the head, injuring Nemeth's neck and taking him out of Under Siege. As Nemeth was being checked by medical staff backstage, Hardy asked TNA Director of Authority Santino Marella to take Nemeth's place in the match at Under Siege, which was granted.

On the April 25 TNA Impact, TNA X Division Champion Mustafa Ali held a "Ballot Box Battle," where members of the TNA roster and staff cast a vote to determine who would challenge Ali for his title at Under Siege. The votes were tallied, and it was determined that Trey Miguel had won by a "suspiciously large margin" of 60 votes. However, Leon Slater accused The Rascalz (Miguel, Zachary Wentz, and Myron Reed) of vote tampering, with Ali suggesting that he have Under Siege off due to this "voter fraud". Santino Marella, in response, suggested a "run-off" number one contender's match between Miguel and Ace Austin – who had the second-highest number of votes – the following week to determine Ali's Under Siege challenger. Austin would defeat Miguel to become Ali's next challenger.

At Rebellion, Jordynne Grace defended the TNA Knockouts World Championship against Steph De Lander. De Lander originally had Matt Cardona in her corner, but Cardona had torn his pectoral muscle and needed surgery. Thus, De Lander enlisted The Good Hands (Jason Hotch and John Skyler) and later Kon to help her defeat Grace. In the closing moments of the match, the lights would go out, revealing PCO and a returning Sami Callihan to neutralize De Lander's helpers and allow Grace to retain her title. On the following TNA Impact, De Lander and Kon challenged Grace and PCO to a intergender tag team match at Under Siege, which TNA made official.

For the past few weeks, The System had tried to convince Masha Slamovich to team up with Alisha Edwards to challenge for the TNA Knockouts World Tag Team Championship. Slamovich has been owed a rematch after she and Killer Kelly lost the titles to current champions Spitfire (Dani Luna and Jody Threat) at Sacrifice. On the Countdown to Rebellion pre-show, after Spitfire retained the titles against Decay (Havok and Rosemary), Slamovich and Edwards confronted Spitfire from the entrance ramp. TNA would announce that Spitfire would defend the Knockouts World Tag Team Titles against Slamovich and Edwards at Under Siege on TNA Impact.

== Results ==
No.	Results	Stipulations	Times
1^{P}	Rhino defeated VSK by pinfall	Singles match	3:36
2^{P}	The F.B.I. (Ray Jaz and Zack Clayton) (with Guido) defeated Batiri (Obariyon and Kodama) by pinfall	Tag team match	4:16
3^{P}	Laredo Kid (c) defeated KC Navarro by pinfall	Singles match for the TNA Digital Media Championship	6:42
4	Josh Alexander and Eric Young defeated Steve Maclin and Frankie Kazarian by pinfall	Tag team match	12:29
5	Ash by Elegance (with "The Personal Concierge" George Iceman) defeated Havok (with Rosemary) by pinfall	Singles match	5:22
6	Joe Hendry defeated Zachary Wentz by pinfall	Singles match	5:13
7	Alisha Edwards and Masha Slamovich defeated Spitfire (Dani Luna and Jody Threat) (c) (with Lars Frederiksen) by pinfall	Tag team match for the TNA Knockouts World Tag Team Championship	6:30
8	Rich Swann (with A. J. Francis) defeated Jake Something by pinfall	Singles match	11:32
9	Jonathan Gresham defeated Kushida by pinfall	Singles match	9:04
10	Jordynne Grace and PCO defeated Steph De Lander and Kon by pinfall	Intergender tag team match	10:58
11	Mustafa Ali (c) defeated Ace Austin by pinfall	Singles match for the TNA X Division Championship	16:33
12	The System (Moose, Brian Myers and Eddie Edwards) (with Alisha Edwards) defeated "Broken" Matt Hardy and Speedball Mountain (Trent Seven and Mike Bailey) by pinfall	Six-man tag team match	23:49
(c) / – the champion(s) heading into the match; P / – the match was broadcast on the pre-show
