= Under Siege (2023) =

2023 Impact Wrestling event

- Promotional poster
- Promotion: Impact Wrestling
- Date: May 26, 2023
- City: London, Ontario, Canada
- Venue: Western Fair District Agriplex

Impact Plus Monthly Specials chronology
← Previous; Sacrifice	Next → Against All Odds

Under Siege chronology
← Previous; 2022	Next → 2024

The 2023 Under Siege was a professional wrestling event produced by Impact Wrestling. It took place on May 26, 2023, at the Western Fair District Agriplex in London, Ontario, Canada, and aired on Impact Plus and YouTube. It was the third event under the Under Siege chronology.

Eleven matches were contested at the event, including two on the pre-show and one taped as a digital exclusive. In the main event, Steve Maclin defeated PCO in a No Disqualification match to retain the Impact World Championship. In other prominent matches, Deonna Purrazzo defeated Jordynne Grace to retain the Impact Knockouts World Championship, and Alex Shelley won a six-way match to become the number one contender to the Impact World Championship. The event also featured the returns of Jake Crist and Mark Andrews (formerly known as Mandrews).

== Production ==
=== Background ===
Under Siege is a professional wrestling event held by Impact Wrestling. It is annually held during the month of May, and the first event was held in 2021. On March 8, 2023, Impact Wrestling announced that Under Siege would take place on May 26, 2023, at the Western Fair District Agriplex in London, Ontario, Canada.

=== Storylines ===
The event featured several professional wrestling matches that involved different wrestlers from pre-existing scripted feuds, plots, and storylines. Wrestlers portray heroes, villains, or less distinguishable characters in scripted events that build tension and culminate in a wrestling match or series of matches. Storylines were produced on Impact's weekly television program.

On April 16, 2023, at Rebellion, Steve Maclin defeated Kushida to win the vacant Impact World Championship. Maclin would later force Impact Executive President Scott D'Amore to present him with the title belt, but later strike him from behind with the title before being stopped by Nick Aldis, who was stationed at the commentary table after announcing his re-signing with Impact Wrestling. On the subsequent episode on Impact!, Maclin would hold a "Changing of the Guard" ceremony to celebrate his title win. However, he stated that while he is now champion, his "mission" in Impact was not yet complete; he wanted to win the title by defeating previous champion Josh Alexander in his home country of Canada, but Alexander had to relinquish the title after tearing his triceps. Maclin wanted to rectify that by issuing an open challenge for the title at Under Siege, so long as the challenger is Canadian. D'Amore would later interrupt the ceremony, accusing Maclin's challenge as him avoiding Aldis. He'd then announce Maclin's challenger for Under Siege, PCO. On the May 11 episode of Impact!, after Maclin has his first successful title defense against Rhino, Maclin continued to attack Rhino as he targeted his injured left knee. As Rhino was medically evacuated, D'Amore informed Maclin that his match against PCO will be a no disqualification match.

At Rebellion, Deonna Purrazzo defeated Jordynne Grace to win the vacant Impact Knockouts World Championship. On April 28, Impact announced that a rematch between Grace and Purrazzo, in which if Grace would lose, she could no longer challenge for the title as long as Purrazzo is champion.

On the April 20 episode of Impact!, Time Machine (Kushida, Alex Shelley, and Chris Sabin) defeated Jonathan Gresham, Mike Bailey, and the Impact X Division Champion Trey Miguel in a six-man tag team match, where Sabin pinned Miguel to win. On May 1, Impact confirmed that Miguel would defend his title against Sabin at Under Siege.

On May 4, Impact announced a six-way match to determine the number one contender for the Impact World Championship at Against All Odds. The participants are: Alex Shelley, Eddie Edwards, Frankie Kazarian, Jonathan Gresham, Moose, and Yuya Uemura.

At Rebellion, during a four-on-three handicap match between The Design (Deaner, Angels, Callihan, and Kon) against Dirty Dango, Joe Hendry, and Santino Marella, Callihan turned on The Design by attacking Deaner with a baseball bat, causing The Design to lose the match. On the May 4 episode of Impact!, during a match between Callihan and Kon, The Design's "Army of Violence", who were clad in wearing yellow hoodies, attacked Callihan, causing a disqualification in his favour. On May 5, it was announced that Callihan will have to choose two partners to face The Design at Under Siege in a six-man tag team match. On May 15, Impact announced Rich Swann as the first of Callihan's two partners.

On the May 4 episode of Impact!, Trinity made her Impact Wrestling debut. Trinity declared her intentions of becoming the Knockouts World Champion, which led to a conformation between Trinity, Jordyne Grace, and Knockouts World Champion Deonna Purrazzo. On May 8, Impact announced that Trinity has an open contract for Under Siege. On the May 18 episode of Impact!, Trinity was confronted by Jai Vidal, the stylist of Gisele Shaw, who had criticized him for taking a selfie with Trinity the previous week. Trinity would retort by challenging Shaw to a match at Under Siege, which was accepted and made official.

At Rebellion, Nick Aldis made his return to Impact Wrestling and immediately staked his claim to the Impact World Championship. Several weeks later, on the May 4 episode of Impact!, as Aldis was interviewed backstage, he was taunted by Kenny King, whom Aldis likened to as sort of a gatekeeper to new signees in Impact. On the May 11 episode of Impact!, Aldis had his first match in Impact Wrestling since June 19, 2022, at Slammiversary, where he defeated Sheldon Jean as King was on commentary. Later in the episode, it was confirmed that Aldis would face King at Under Siege.

On May 12, Impact announced that the Impact World Tag Team Champions ABC (Ace Austin and Chris Bey) would defend their titles against former WWE wrestlers Subculture (Mark Andrews and Flash Morgan Webster) who would be accompanied by Dani Luna.

On the April 6 episode of Impact!, Director of Authority Santino Marella was mysteriously attacked backstage. Though Sami Callihan was originally thought of as the culprit as part of his initiation into The Design, Marella was found again laid out backstage on April 27, well after Callihan betrayed The Design. For the next few weeks, self-proclaimed Assistant Director of Authority Dirty Dango and Impact Digital Media Champion Joe Hendry investigated the case, with a tuft of hair being the sole piece of evidence they have. On the May 18 episode of Impact!, Dango would soon accuse Hendry of taking out Marella, only for a scuffle between the two to reveal that it was Dango's chest hair that Marella had taken – making him the true assailant. Dango would soon lay out Hendry while proclaiming "case closed." The following day, Impact announced that Dango will challenge Hendry for the Digital Media Championship on the Countdown to Under Siege pre-show.

== Event ==
Other on-screen personnel
Role	Name
Commentators	Tom Hannifan
Commentators	Matthew Rehwoldt
Ring announcer	David Penzer
Referees	Allison Leigh
Referees	Daniel Spencer
Referees	Frank Gastineau
Interviewer	Gia Miller

=== Pre-show ===
There were two matches contested on the pre-show. In the opener, The Death Dollz faced The Coven. In the closing stages, as Courtney Rush was attempting a Sharpshooter to Taylor Wilde, KiLynn King came from behind and delivered a suplex to Rush. Jessicka then delivered a running splash to King, allowing Rush to lock in another Sharpshooter on Wilde, forcing her to submit.

In the pre-show main event, Joe Hendry defended the Impact Digital Media Championship against Dirty Dango. In the closing stages, Hendry delivered a clothesline and a powerslam to Dango for a two-count. As Hendry was looking for the Standing Ovation, Dango blocked it and delivered a low blow in front of the referee, forcing a disqualification. After the match, Director of Authority Santino Marella came down to the ring to help Hendry up.

=== Preliminary matches ===
In the opening contest, Nick Aldis faced Kenny King (with Sheldon Jean). In the opening stages, as King was attempting a springboard leg drop, Aldis evaded it and delivered a pumphandle fallaway slam. Aldis them delivered a diving elbow drop, but Jean distracted the referee. King then delivered a spinebuster, with King's feet on the ropes, but the referee caught him. Aldis then delivered a mid-air powerbomb and locked in the Texas Cloverleaf for the submission win.

Next, The Design faced Rich Swann, Sami Callihan and the returning Jake Crist. In the opening stages, as Callihan was attempting the Cactus Driver, Angels evaded it and landed an enzeguiri. Crist then delivered a springboard moonsault to Kon. Crist and Callihan then delivered simultaneous Death Valley Drivers to Deaner and Angels. Swann then delivered double handspring cutters to Kon and Deaner. Callihan then delivered the Cactus Driver to Deaner, allowing Swann to deliver a schoolboy pin to Angels to pickup the win.

Next, Trinity faced Gisele Shaw (with Jai Vidal and Savannah Evans). In the closing stages, Shaw delivered a hangman DDT and a suplex for a two-count. Trinity then delivered a backbreaker, a headscicssors takedown, a split-legged moonsault and then locked in Starstruck for the submission win.

In the next match, ABC defended the Impact World Tag Team Championship against Flash Morgan Webster and the returning Mark Andrews of Subculture (with Dani Luna). In the opening stages, Chris Bey delivered a Tope Con Hilo on Morgan Webster for a two-count. Andrews then delivered a double Pele Kick to both Bey and Ace Austin. Andrews then delivered Code Red to Austin for a two-count. Bey then delivered a missile dropkick for a two-count. Morgan Webster then delivered a Falcon Arrow for another two-count. Andrews and Webster then delivered the Stundog Millionaire/Diving Senton combination to Bey for a two-count. Bey then delivered a Poisonrana to both Webster and Andrews, allowing Bey and Austin to deliver The Fold/Art of Finesse combination to retain the titles.

Next, Trey Miguel defended the Impact X-Division Championship against Chris Sabin. In the opening contest, Miguel delivered a Meteora for a two-count. As Sabin was attempting the Cradle Shock, Miguel gouged Sabin's eyes to escape. Unintentionally, Sabin delivered the Cradle Shock to the referee. Sabin again delivered the Cradle Shock to Miguel, but the referee was still down. Miguel then spray painted Sabin and rolled him up for the victory.

The next match was a Six-way match contested between Alex Shelley, Yuya Uemura, Frankie Kazarian, Eddie Edwards, Moose and Jonathan Gresham; to determine the #1 contender to the Impact World Championship. In the opening stages, Edwards delivered a modified back suplex and immediately Kazarian deliver a backstabber and a Fadeaway leg drop to Edwards. Moose then delivered a Uranage and a powerbomb to Uemura, Kazarian and Gresham. Uemura then delivered a bulldog to Moose for a two-count. Moose then delivered the Sky High spinebuster, but Shelley broke up the pin. Edwards delivered the Boston Knee Party to Kazarian, Moose delivered the Spear to Edwards, Uemura delivered a German suplex to Moose, and Shelley delivered Shellshock to Uemura to become the #1 contender.

In the penultimate match, Deonna Purrazzo defended the Impact Knockouts World Championship against Jordynne Grace. In the opening stages, Purrazzo delivered a modified neckbreaker and a diving Senton to the outside. Grace then delivered a spinning powerbomb and a German suplex for a two-count. Purrazzo then delivered a Russian leg sweep and then locked in the Fujiwara armbar, but Grace escaped. Purrazzo delivered the Queen's Gambit for a two-count, and Grace delivered a Jackhammer for another two-count. Purrazzo then delivered an avalanche Queen's Gambit to retain the title.

=== Main event ===
In the main event, Steve Maclin defended the Impact World Championship in a No Disqualification match against PCO. In the opening stages, Maclin delivered a snap suplex into the steel steps. As Maclin was attempting a suicide dive, PCO smacked his head with a cooking tray. As PCO was attempting to use a staple gun, Maclin delivered a low blow and delivered chair shots to PCO. Maclin then stapled PCO's mouth shut and hit him with a sledgehammer. Maclin then delivered a spinebuster onto the sledgehammer for a two-count. PCO then delivered a DDT, a Codebreaker, a diving leg drop, and a reverse DDT for another two-count. As PCO was attempting to dive into Maclin unto a pair of cinderblocks, Maclin stopped him and delivered the KIA onto the cinderblocks to retain the title. After the match, Maclin called out then Impact president Scott D'Amore to present the title around his waist. As D'Amore was offering Maclin a handshake, Bully Ray came out and choked D'Amore. As Commentator Matthew Rehwoldt was trying to help D'Amore, Bully Ray poured lighter fluid on Rehwoldt, which brought out The Motor City Machine Guns, but Maclin and Bully Ray continued beating them down. Bully Ray then lit up the table on fire and powerbombed D'Amore through it.

== Results ==
No.	Results	Stipulations	Times
1^{D}	Tyler Tirva defeated Jason Hotch (with Brian Myers and John Skyler) by pinfall (Note: The match was taped for an Impact Digital Exclusive that aired on May 30.)	Singles match	5:13
2^{P}	The Death Dollz (Courtney Rush and Jessicka) defeated The Coven (KiLynn King and Taylor Wilde) by submission	Tag team match	7:28
3^{P}	Joe Hendry (c) defeated Dirty Dango by disqualification	Singles match for the Impact Digital Media Championship	5:43
4	Nick Aldis defeated Kenny King (with Sheldon Jean) by submission	Singles match	8:58
5	Rich Swann, Sami Callihan, and Jake Crist defeated The Design (Deaner, Angels, and Kon) by pinfall	Six-man tag team match	10:13
6	Trinity defeated Gisele Shaw (with Jai Vidal and Savannah Evans) by submission	Singles match	10:28
7	ABC (Ace Austin and Chris Bey) (c) defeated Subculture (Mark Andrews and Flash Morgan Webster) (with Dani Luna) by pinfall	Tag team match for the Impact World Tag Team Championship	13:15
8	Trey Miguel (c) defeated Chris Sabin by pinfall	Singles match for the Impact X Division Championship	18:34
9	Alex Shelley defeated Eddie Edwards, Frankie Kazarian, Jonathan Gresham, Moose, and Yuya Uemura by pinfall	Six-way match to determine the #1 contender for the Impact World Championship at Against All Odds	11:47
10	Deonna Purrazzo (c) defeated Jordynne Grace by pinfall	Last Chance match for the Impact Knockouts World Championship; Since Grace lost, she can no longer challenge for the title as long as Purrazzo is champion.	13:23
11	Steve Maclin (c) defeated PCO by pinfall	No Disqualification match for the Impact World Championship	15:44
(c) / – the champion(s) heading into the match; D / – this was a dark match; P / – the match was broadcast on the pre-show
