= TNA Under Siege =

Professional wrestling event series

Under Siege
- Promotions: Total Nonstop Action Wrestling
- First event: Under Siege (2021)
- Last event: Under Siege (2025)

Under Siege was a professional wrestling event held by Total Nonstop Action Wrestling. Since its inception in 2021, it was held annually during the month of May.

== History ==
Since of April 2020, due to the COVID-19 pandemic in the United States, Impact had to present the majority of its programming from a behind closed doors set at Skyway Studios in Nashville, Tennessee. The inaugural Under Siege event took place on May 15, 2021, at the Skyway Studios. On June 3, 2021, upon Slammiversary, Impact would open the door for attendance for their upcoming shows. The second Under Siege event was in front of a live crowd, which took place on May 7, 2022, at the Promowest Pavilion at Ovation, in Newport, Kentucky.

== Events ==
#	Event	Date	City	Venue	Main event	Ref.
1	Under Siege (2021)	May 15, 2021	Nashville, Tennessee	Skyway Studios	Chris Bey vs. Chris Sabin vs. Matt Cardona vs. Moose vs. Sami Callihan vs. Trey Miguel in a six-way match to determine the number one contender for the Impact World Championship	
2	Under Siege (2022)	May 7, 2022	Newport, Kentucky	Promowest Pavilion at Ovation	Josh Alexander (c) vs. Tomohiro Ishii for the Impact World Championship	
3	Under Siege (2023)	May 26, 2023	London, Ontario, Canada	Western Fair District Agriplex	Steve Maclin (c) vs. PCO in a No Disqualification match for the Impact World Championship	
4	Under Siege (2024)	May 3, 2024	Albany, New York	Washington Avenue Armory	"Broken" Matt Hardy and Speedball Mountain (Trent Seven and Mike Bailey) vs. The System (Moose, Brian Myers and Eddie Edwards)	
5	Under Siege (2025)	May 23, 2025	Brampton, Ontario, Canada	CAA Centre	Joe Hendry and Elijah vs Frankie Kazarian and Trick Williams	
(c) – refers to the champion(s) heading into the match
