= Kiera Hogan =

American professional wrestler

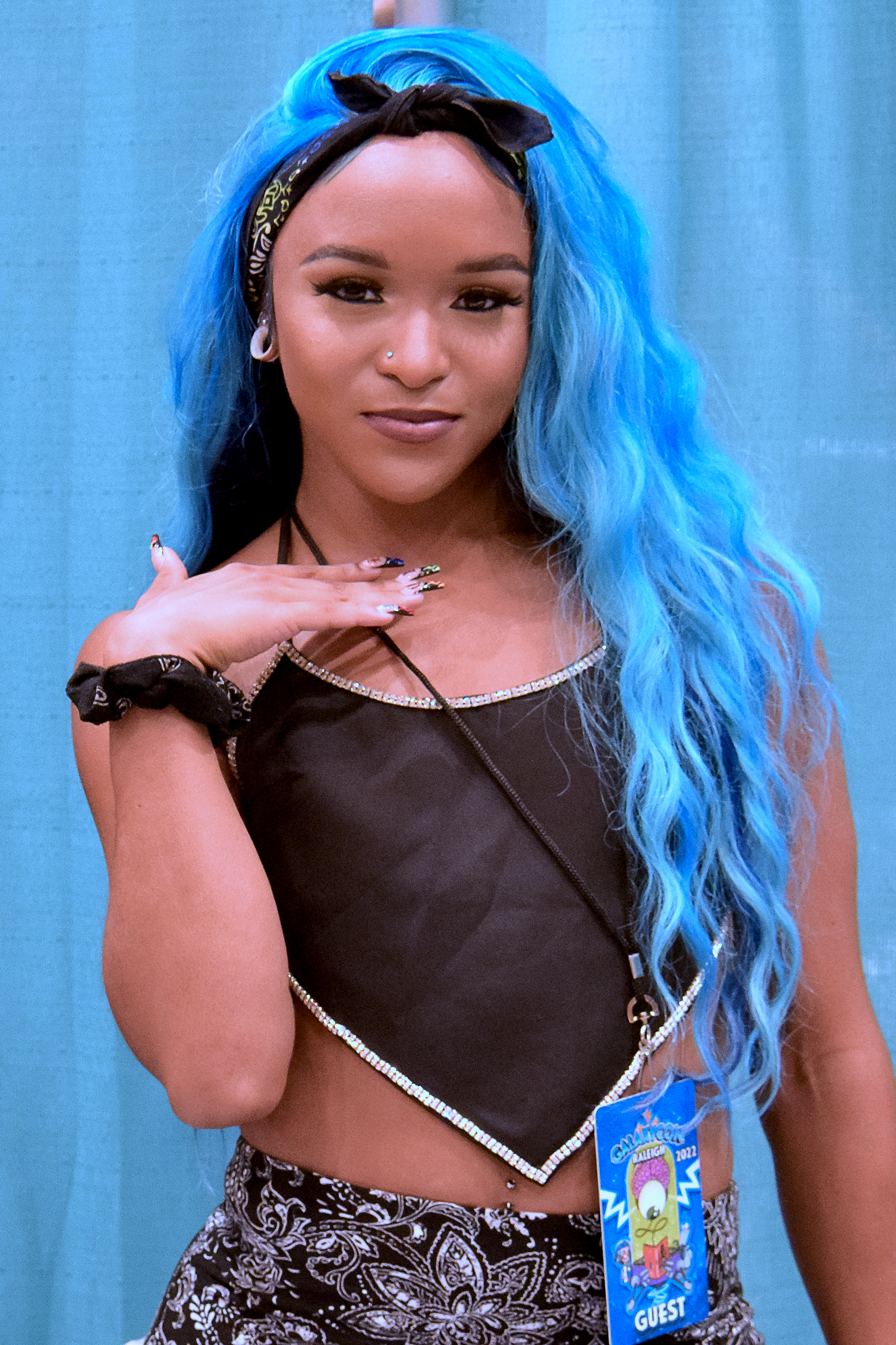
- Hogan in 2022

Personal information
- Born: September 16, 1994 (age 32) Decatur, Georgia, U.S.
- Life partners: Diamante (2019–present)

Professional wrestling career
- Ring name(s): Fire; Kiera Hogan
- Billed height: 4 ft 11 in (150 cm)
- Billed weight: 114 lb (52 kg)
- Billed from: Hotlanta, Georgia
- Trained by: Curtis Hughes
- Debut: April 2, 2015

Kiera Hogan (born September 16, 1994) is an American professional wrestler and reality television star. She is signed to Total Nonstop Action Wrestling (TNA), where she is one-half of Fire 'N Flava with Tasha Steelz and a three-time TNA Knockouts Tag Team Champion. She is also a former member of DemonXBunny, where she competed alongside Allie and Rosemary. She is also known for her time with All Elite Wrestling (AEW).

In 2025, Hogan appeared on the reality television show Joseline's Cabaret California on Zeus Network as a cast member.

== Professional wrestling career ==
=== Early career (2015–2018) ===
Hogan began her career wrestling throughout Atlanta in 2015. She defeated Owen Knight to win the WWA4 Intergender Championship on April 16, 2015. She became a regular throughout the Georgia independent wrestling scene, competing for promotions such as Atlanta Wrestling Entertainment and the All-Star Wrestling Network. In November 2015, she began working for the Organization Of Modern Extreme Grappling Arts (OMEGA) in North Carolina. In 2016, Hogan began working throughout the United States, competing for promotions such as Booker T's Reality of Wrestling in Houston and Shine Wrestling in Florida. On February 11, 2017, she captured the WSU Spirit Championship at the WSU 10th Anniversary Show in Vorhees, New Jersey. On June 16, 2018, Hogan lost the WSU Spirit title against Jordynne Grace.

=== Impact Wrestling (2017–2021) ===
==== Various storylines (2017–2020) ====
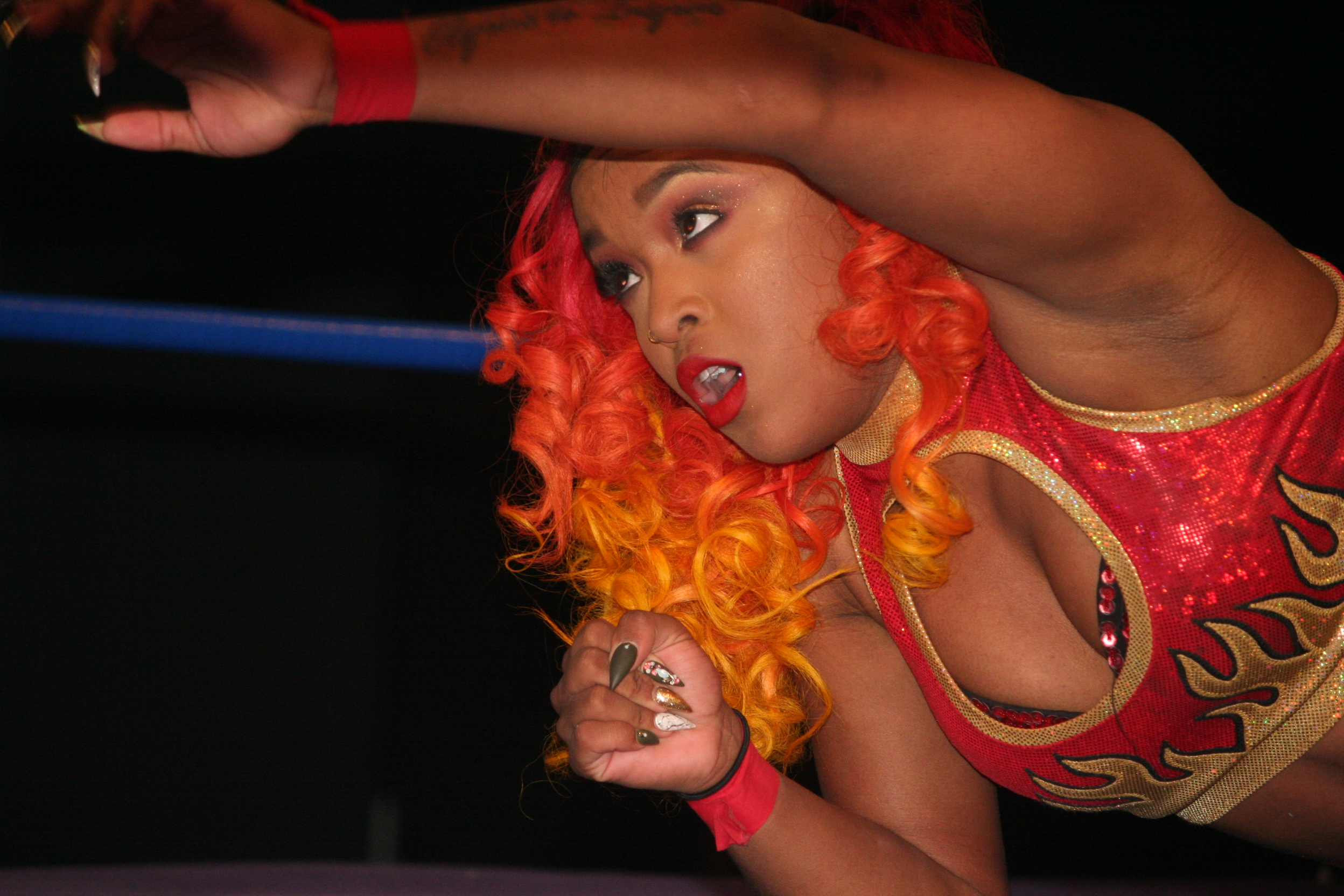
Hogan in the ring in 2018

On August 17, 2017, it was reported that Impact Wrestling (then known as Global Force Wrestling) had signed Hogan to a contract. On the February 1, 2018, episode of Impact!, Hogan made her Impact Wrestling debut by defeating the Knockouts Champion Laurel Van Ness in a non-title match. She received a championship match on the following episode of Impact! where she fought in a losing effort. Hogan made her pay-per-view debut at Redemption, when she unsuccessfully challenged Taya Valkyrie. Hogan received a rematch against Valkyrie on the May 3, 2018, episode of Impact!, when she won by disqualification after being attacked by Tessa Blanchard during the match. Followed that incident, Hogan faced Blanchard on the May 17 episode of Impact!, when she lost. After the match, Blanchard attacked her until Madison Rayne made the save. On the June 14 episode of Impact! Hogan unsuccessfully challenged Blanchard once again in a No Disqualification match. On October 4 episode of Impact!, Hogan lost to Su Yung. After the match, Yung and Allie brawled. Hogan saved Allie from Yung, only to be put inside a coffin by Yung. At Bound for Glory, Allie rescued Hogan from the Undead Realm.

On the May 3, 2019, edition of Impact, Hogan faced Rosemary in a grudge match stemming from a confrontation weeks prior; she was defeated via disqualification when Su Yung's undead bridesmaids entered and attacked Rosemary. Hogan began turning heel when she refused to help Rosemary against the bridesmaids, and she cemented herself as a villainess in a backstage interview on the following week, when she claimed that she wasn't getting anywhere trying to be friends with everyone, and accused Jordynne Grace of taking advantage of her. On the May 17 edition of Impact, Hogan eliminated Grace and Scarlett Bordeaux in a Knockouts Battle Royal, only to be eliminated herself by Blanchard. Following the battle royal, she began a feud with Grace, with Grace getting the upper hand on multiple occasions. At Bound for Glory, Hogan competed in the Call Your Shot Gauntlet match which was won by Eddie Edwards.

==== Fire 'N Flava (2020–2021) ====
On the May 19, 2020, episode of Impact!, Hogan approached Impact's newest knockout Tasha Steelz and offered her to join forces with her, which Steelz agreed to. The new formed duo, now known as Fire 'N Flava, won their first match as a tag team on the June 2 episode of Impact!, where they defeated Kylie Rae and Susie. Hogan and Steelz quickly entered into a feud with Havok and Nevaeh, which led into a no disqualification match on the August 11 episode of Impact!, where Hogan and Steelz were victorious, ending their feud with Havok and Nevaeh in the process. At Bound for Glory, Hogan competed in the 20-wrestler Intergender Call Your Shot Gauntlet match which was won by Rhino.

On January 16, 2021, at Hard to Kill, Hogan and Steelz defeated Havok and Nevaeh to become the new Knockouts Tag Team Champions. At Rebellion, they lost the titles to Jordynne Grace and Rachael Ellering, ending their reign at 99 days. At Under Siege, Hogan and Steelz regained the titles from Grace and Ellering, thus becoming two-time champions. On the Slammiversary pre-show, they lost the titles to Decay (Havok and Rosemary).

On July 18, she announced her departure from the company. On the August 5 episode of Impact!, Savannah Evans attacked Hogan as Steelz only watched, thus disbanding Fire 'N Flava. The following week on Impact!, she was abducted by Su Yung and Kimber Lee, this was used to write her off television.

=== Women of Wrestling (2018–2021) ===
Hogan made her debut of Women of Wrestling (WOW) during their taping in October 2018, under the name Fire. On WOW's first episode to premier on AXS TV on January 18, 2019, Fire had her first match on WOW, where she unsuccessfully challenged Abilene Maverick. Through the second season on AXS TV, Fire teamed with Adrenaline in the tag team tournament for the vacant WOW Tag Team Championship in which they won in the second-season finale on AXS TV on May 16, which aired on tape delay on November 23.

=== All Elite Wrestling / Ring of Honor (2021–2025) ===
Hogan made her AEW debut on August 11, 2021, against Hikaru Shida on AEW: Dark Elevation where she lost. On September 6, Hogan picked up her first win for the company on AEW Dark Elevation facing Blair Onyx. On September 28, on AEW Dark Excalibur noted that Hogan had signed to the company which Hogan later revealed was true. On April 13, 2022, on Dynamite Hogan became a part of The Baddies stable which included her, Red Velvet and Jade Cargill. On the November 23, 2022, episode of Dynamite, Cargill dismissed Hogan from The Baddies.

On the June 22, 2023 episode of Ring of Honor Kiera faced Athena in a Chicago Street Fight match for the ROH Women's World Championship but was unsuccessful.

On December 27, 2023, Kiera Hogan entered the inaugural ROH Women's World Television Championship tournament but lost to Diamante in the first round. In September 2025, Hogan was removed from AEW's roster page on their official website, signaling her departure from the company.

=== Return to Total Nonstop Action Wrestling (2026–present) ===
On August 23, 2026 at Lockdown, Hogan made her first Total Nonstop Action Wrestling (formerly Impact Wrestling) appearance in five years, filling in for Rosemary to assist Allie defeat The Elegance Brand (Heather by Elegance and M by Elegance) to retain the TNA Knockouts World Tag Team Championship. After the match, TNA announced that Hogan had officially re-signed with the promotion. At Bound for Glory on October 11, Hogan and Allie lost the titles to Apex (Shayna Baszler and Zoey Serrano). On the October 22 episode of Impact!, Hogan turned heel and attacked Allie, aligning herself with Tasha Steelz to reunite Fire 'N Flava.

== Personal life ==
Hogan is engaged to fellow professional wrestler Diamante.

== Championships and accomplishments ==
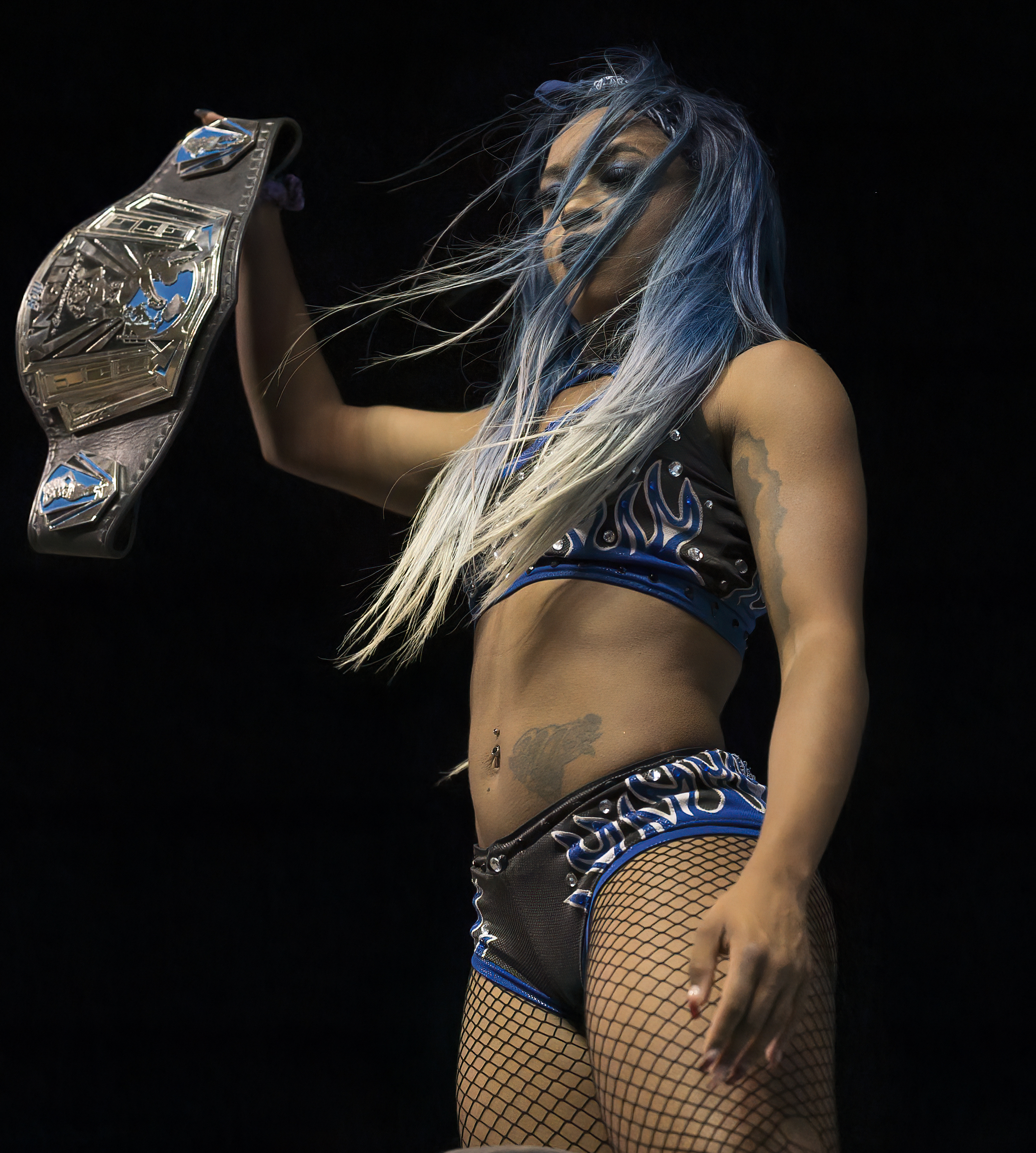
Hogan as the RCW Women's Champion in September 2019

- Impact Wrestling / Total Nonstop Action Wrestling
  - Impact/TNA Knockouts Tag Team Championship (3 times) – with Tasha Steelz (2), Allie and Rosemary (1)
  - Impact Knockouts Tag Team Championship Tournament (2020–21) – with Tasha Steelz
- Pro Wrestling Illustrated
  - Ranked No. 54 of the top 100 female wrestlers in the PWI Female 100 in 2019
- River City Wrestling
  - RCW Women's Championship (1 time)
- Women of Wrestling
  - WOW Tag Team Championship (1 time) – with Adrenaline
  - WOW Tag Team Championship Tournament (2019) – with Adrenaline
- Women Superstars Uncensored
  - WSU Spirit Championship (1 time)
- World Wrestling Alliance 4
  - WWA4 Intergender Champion (1 time)
