= Fire 'N Flava =

Professional wrestling tag team

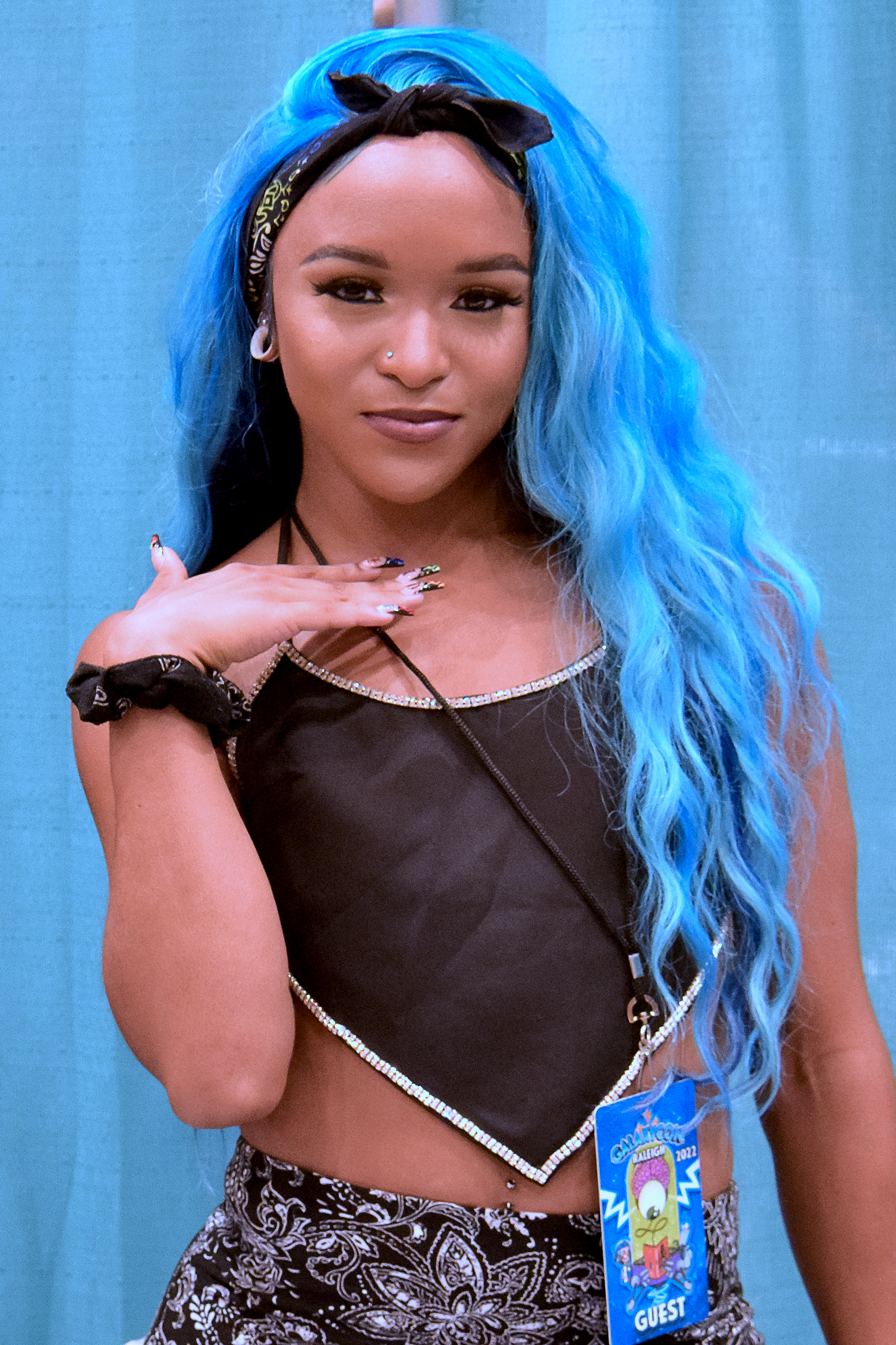
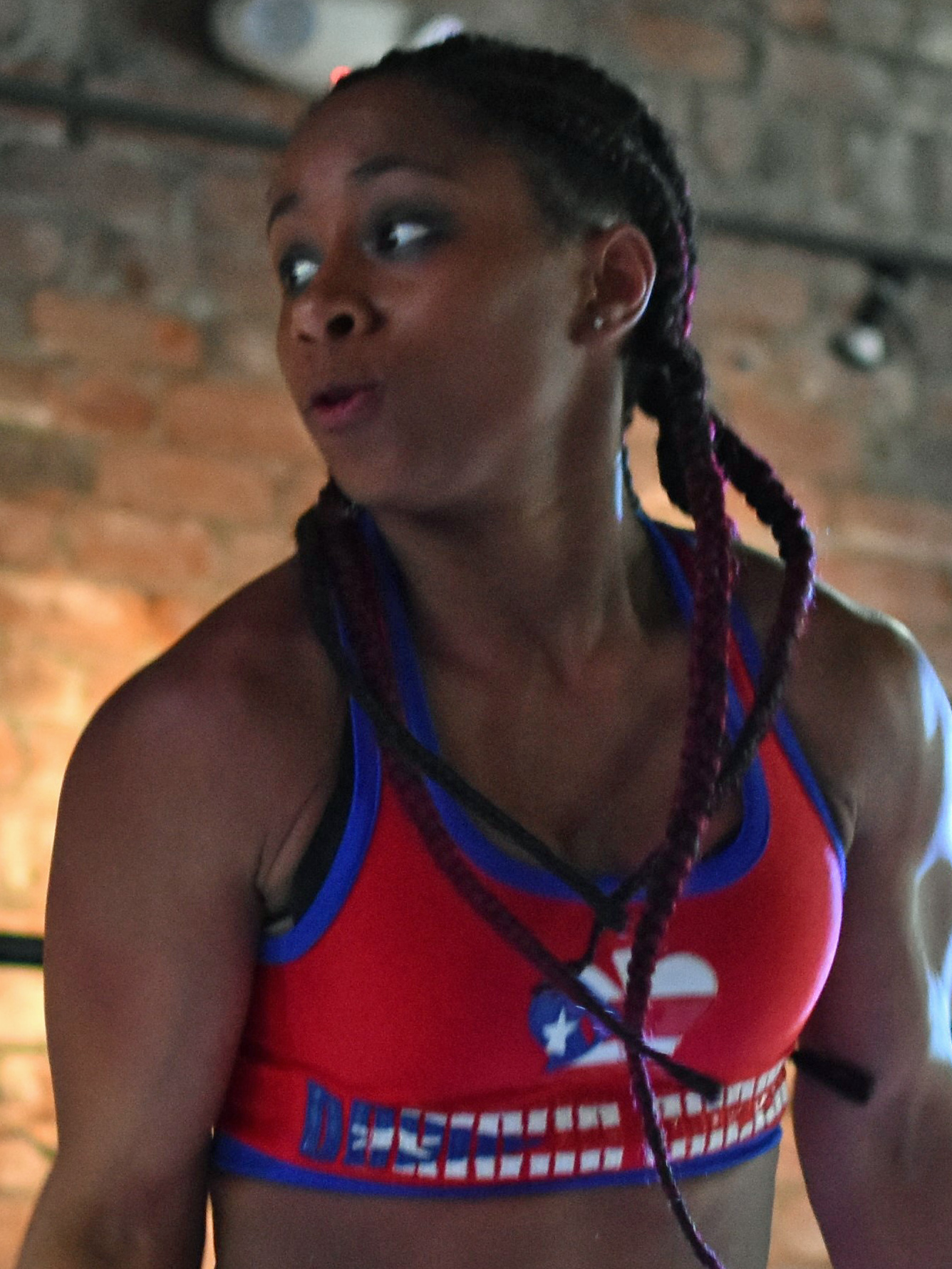
- Kiera (Left) and Tasha (Right)

Tag team
- Name(s): Fire 'N Flava; Kiera Hogan and Tasha Steelz
- Members: Kiera Hogan; Tasha Steelz
- Billed heights: Hogan: 4 ft 11 in (150 cm); Steelz: 5 ft 4 in (1.63 m)
- Debut: May 19, 2020
- Years active: 2020–2021, 2026-present

Fire 'N Flava is an American professional wrestling tag team consisting of Kiera Hogan and Tasha Steelz. The team is known for working in Impact Wrestling/Total Nonstop Action Wrestling (TNA), where they are two-time Impact Knockouts Tag Team Champions. After the two lost their Knockouts Tag Team titles during their second reign the two were disbanded due to Kiera Hogan announcing her departure from Impact Wrestling.

== History ==
=== Total Nonstop Action / Impact Wrestling (2020–2021; 2026-present) ===
On the May 12, 2020 episode of Impact!, Tasha Steelz made her Impact Wrestling debut by competing against Kylie Rae in a losing effort. The following week, on Impact!, Kiera Hogan approached Steelz backstage and offered to make a tag team with her and Steelz accepted the offer. They competed in their first match as a team on the June 2 episode of Impact!, where they defeated Kylie Rae and Susie. They soon began feuding with Havok and Nevaeh, which culminated in a no disqualification match between the two teams on the August 11 episode of Impact!, which Hogan and Steelz won. They suffered their first loss as a team on the October 6 episode of Impact!, against Rosemary and Taya Valkyrie. On the October 13 episode of Impact!, Hogan and Steelz competed against the team of Rosemary and Valkyrie and the team of Havok and Nevaeh in a three-way match, which Rosemary and Valkyrie won.

In November, the team was entered into a tournament for the revived Knockouts Tag Team Championship, in which they defeated Team Sea Stars (Ashley Vox and Delmi Exo) in the quarterfinal on the November 24 episode of Impact! and Rosemary and Taya Valkyrie in the semifinal on the December 15 episode of Impact!, thus advancing to the tournament final at the Hard To Kill pay-per-view on January 16, 2021, where they defeated Havok and Nevaeh to win the Knockouts Tag Team Championship. It was during this time that the team became known as Fire 'N Flava. They successfully defended the titles against Havok and Nevaeh in a Texas Tornado match at No Surrender and Jazz and Jordynne Grace at Sacrifice. They also made a successful title defense against Thick And Juicy 2.0 (Brooke Valentine and Willow Nightingale) at Game Changer Wrestling's For The Culture event on April 8.

Fire 'N Flava were supposed to defend the titles against Jazz and Jordynne Grace at Rebellion but Jazz was forced to retire and withdrew from the match. Rachael Ellering stepped in as Jazz's replacement as Fire 'N Flava lost the titles to Ellering and Grace at Rebellion. However, Fire 'N Flava defeated Ellering and Grace in a rematch to win their second Knockouts Tag Team Championship at Under Siege. After successfully retaining their titles in a rematch on the June 3 episode of Impact!, Fire 'N Flava entered into a feud with Susan and Kimber Lee, defeating them at Against All Odds to retain their tag titles. They eventually lost the titles to Decay (Rosemary and Havok) at Slammiversary.

On the August 5 episode of Impact!, Savannah Evans attacked Hogan as Steelz only watched, thus disbanding Fire 'N Flava.

On the October 22, 2026 edition of Impact!, Hogan would turn heel on Allie and reunite with Steelz, only to be intercepted by the returning Shotzi Blackheart.

== Championships and accomplishments ==
- Impact Wrestling
  - Impact Knockouts Tag Team Championship (2 times)
  - Impact Knockouts Tag Team Championship Tournament (2021)
