= Tasha Steelz =

American professional wrestler (born 1987)

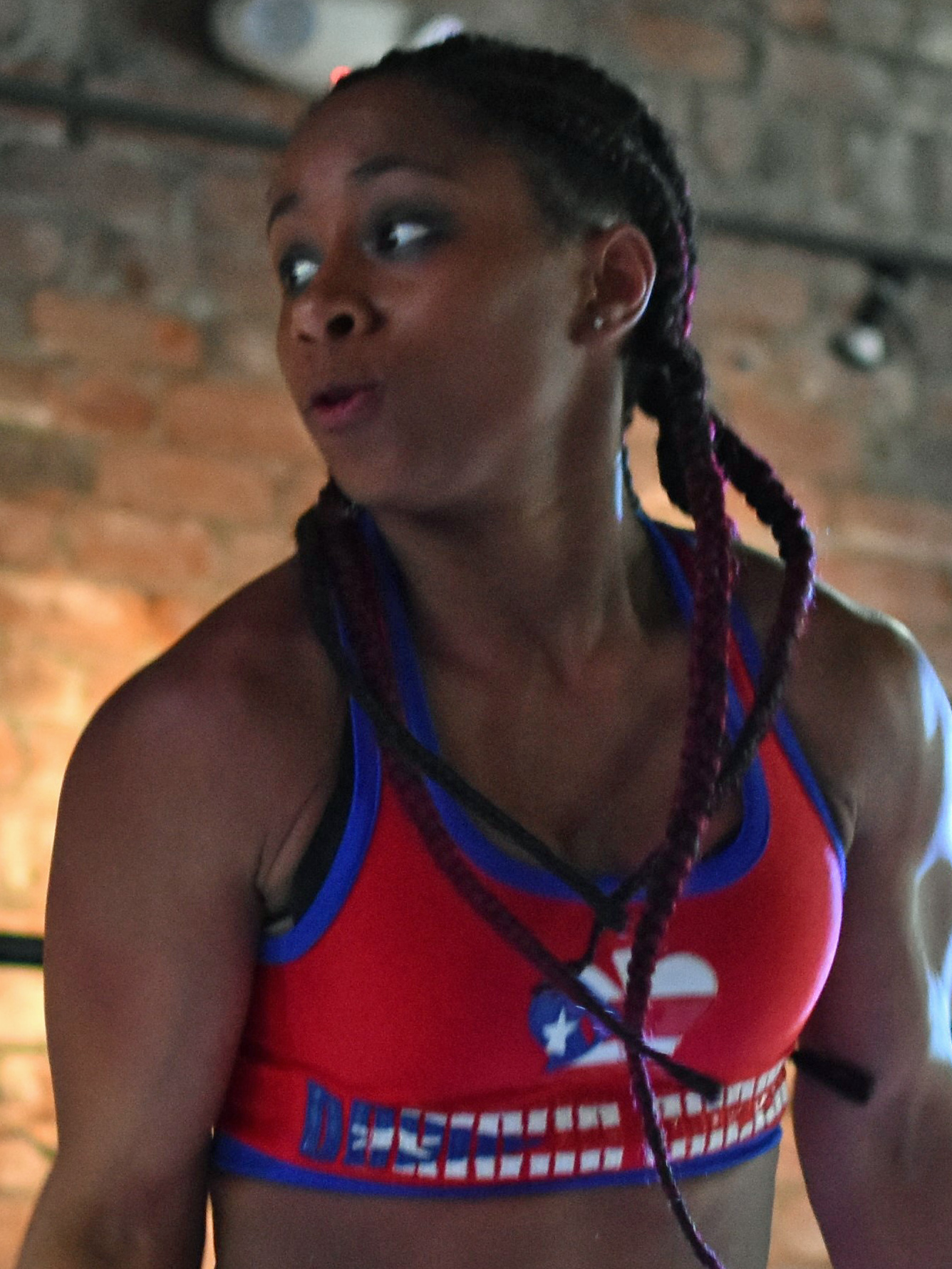
- Steelz in April 2018

Personal information
- Born: Latasha Harris; April 3, 1987 (age 39) Newark, New Jersey, U.S.

Professional wrestling career
- Ring name(s): Flava; Tasha Steelz
- Billed from: Brick City
- Trained by: Damian Adams
- Debut: March 12, 2016

Latasha Harris (born April 3, 1987) is an American professional wrestler, better known by the ring name Tasha Steelz. She is signed to Total Nonstop Action Wrestling (TNA), where she is one-half of Fire 'N Flava with Kiera Hogan. She is a former one-time Knockouts World Champion, and a two-time Knockouts World Tag Team Champion. She also worked in National Wrestling Alliance (NWA) and Ring of Honor (ROH).

== Professional wrestling career ==
=== Ring of Honor (2017–2020) ===
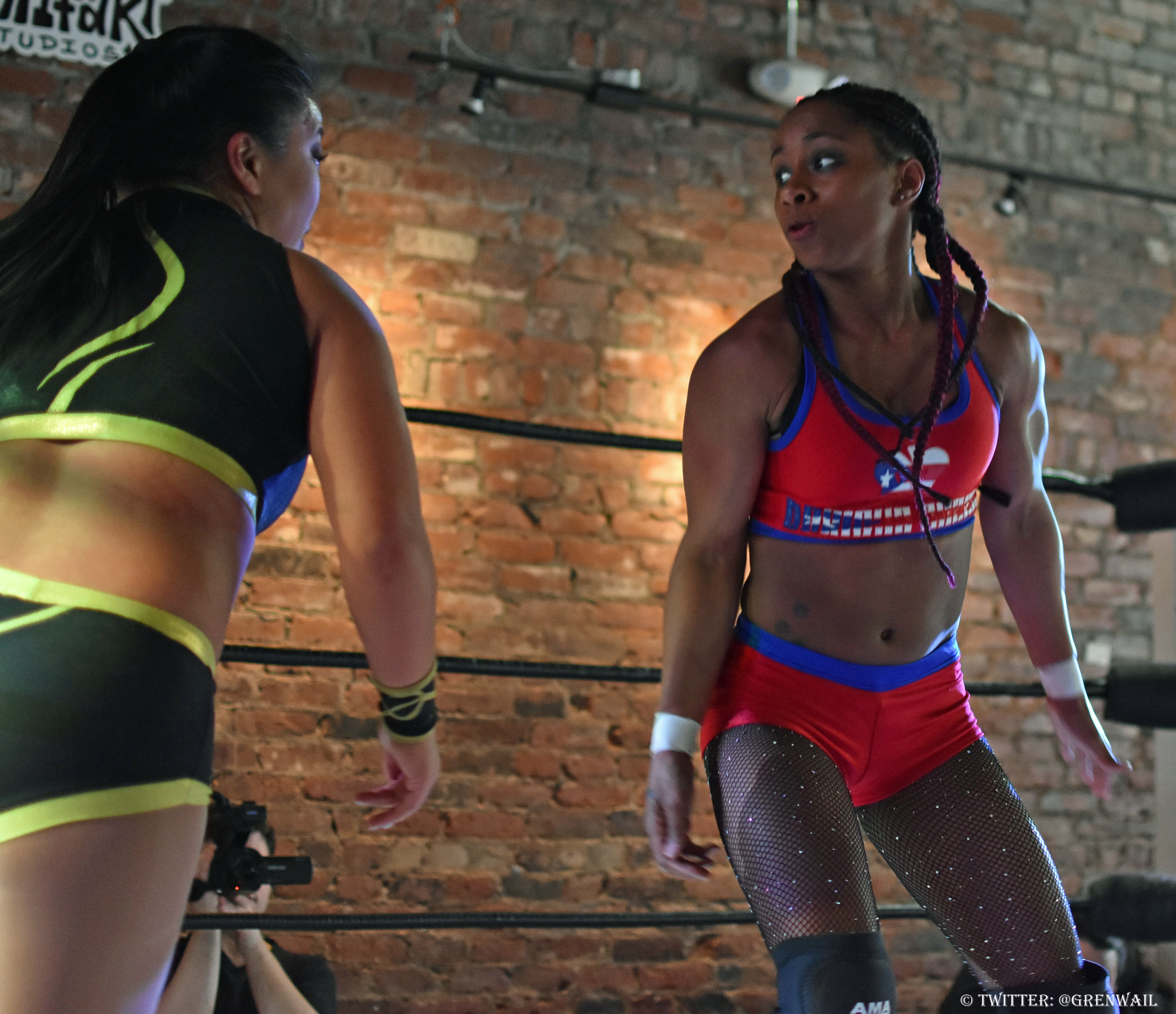
Steelz in 2018 during a match with Karen Q.

Steelz made her Ring of Honor (ROH) debut on April 1, 2017, at the Supercard of Honor XI pre-show, where she defeated Brandi Lauren. On the September 15, 2018, episode of ROH TV Steelz unsuccessfully challenged the Women of Honor World Champion Sumie Sakai in a non-title Proving Ground match. On the July 12, 2019, episode of ROH TV, after defeating Angelina Love, Jenny Rose and Stella Grey, Steelz became the No. 1 contender for the Women of Honor World Championship which then was held by Kelly Klein. Steelz faced Klein for the championship on August 9, 2019, at Summer Supercard, where Klein retained the title. Steelz was booked to participant at the Quest for Gold tournament for the new Ring of Honor Women's World Championship, which was supposed to take place on April 24, 2020. However, the show was cancelled due to the COVID-19 pandemic. Steelz would later sign with Impact Wrestling.

=== National Wrestling Alliance (2019–2020) ===
Steelz made her National Wrestling Alliance (NWA) debut on December 14, 2019, at Into the Fire, where she unsuccessfully challenged Thunder Rosa. After having a couple of matches against Marti Belle and Melina, Steelz made her final televised appearance on the May 12, 2020, episode of NWA Power, where she defeated Ashley Vox and Belle.

=== Impact Wrestling/Total Nonstop Action Wrestling ===
==== Fire 'N Flava (2020–2021) ====
Steelz made her Impact Wrestling debut on the May 17, 2019, episode of Impact!, where she competed in a Knockouts battle royal, which was won by Glenn Gilbertti. Steelz made her return to the company on the May 12, 2020, episode of Impact!, where she unsuccessfully challenged Kylie Rae. On May 13, Impact Wrestling announced that Steelz has signed with company.

With Steelz arriving to Impact Wrestling, she quickly formed an alliance with Kiera Hogan, establishing themselves as the villainous duo of the Knockouts division. On the June 2 episode of Impact!, Steelz won her first match on Impact, as she teamed with Hogan where they defeated the team of Rae and Susie. Hogan and Steelz, now known as Fire 'N Flava, found themselves feuding with Havok and Neveah, which led into a no disqualification match on the August 11 episode of Impact!, where Hogan and Steelz were victorious, ending their feud with Havok and Nevaeh in the process. On January 16, 2021, at Hard to Kill, Hogan and Steelz defeated Havok and Nevaeh to become the new Impact Knockouts Tag Team Champions. On April 25 at Rebellion, they lost the titles to Jordynne Grace and Rachael Ellering, ending their reign at 99 days. On May 15, at Under Siege, Hogan and Steelz won them back to become two-time champions. On the Slammiversary pre-show, they lost the titles to Decay (Havok and Rosemary). On the August 5 episode of Impact!, Savannah Evans attacked Hogan as Steelz only watched, thus disbanding Fire 'N Flava.

==== Knockouts World Champion (2021–2022) ====
On July 31 at Homecoming, Steelz teamed with Fallah Bahh to compete in a tournament to crown a Homecoming King and Queen, but were defeated by Decay (Crazzy Steve and Rosemary) in the first round. At Emergence, she teamed with Bahh, No Way, and Savannah Evans for an eight-person tag match, losing to Decay (Steve, Rosemary, Havok, and Black Taurus). In October, Steelz competed in the Knockouts Knockdown tournament, to determine who will get a future shot at the Impact Knockouts Championship, defeating Jamie Senegal in the quarterfinals, Chelsea Green in the semifinals, but lost to Mercedes Martinez in the final. At Bound for Glory, she participated in the Call Your Shot Gauntlet match, where the winner could choose any championship match of their choice, eliminating Rachael Ellering but was eliminated by Melina.

On January 8, 2022, at Hard to Kill, Steelz won the inaugural Knockouts Ultimate X match to become the number one contender for the Impact Knockouts World Championship. On February 19 at No Surrender, she went up against Mickie James for the title in a losing effort. On the March 3 episode of Impact!, Steelz defeated Chelsea Green to get another shot at the title. Two days later, at Sacrifice, she defeated James to win the Impact Knockouts World Championship for the first time. On the March 24 episode of Impact!, Steelz made her first successful title defense against James in a Street Fight. At Multiverse of Matches, she teamed with Savannah Evans in a four-way tag team match for the Impact Knockouts World Tag Team Championship, which was won by The Influence (Madison Rayne and Tenille Dashwood). Steelz then retained her title against Decay, beating Rosemary at Rebellion, and Havok at Under Siege. On June 19 at Slammiversary, she lost the title to Jordynne Grace in the inaugural Queen of the Mountain match, ending her reign at 106 days. On July 1 at Against All Odds, Steelz failed to recapture the title from Grace in a rematch.

==== Various rivalries and hiatus (2022–2023) ====
On the August 4 episode of Impact!, Steelz started a feud with the debuting Killer Kelly, commentating a match between two local talents that the latter took out afterwards. The following weeks saw Steelz and Savannah Evans getting attacked by Kelly. On September 23, at the Countdown to Victory Road pre-show, Steelz defeated Kelly by disqualification. At Bound for Glory, Steelz competed in the Call Your Shot Gauntlet, eliminating Evans and Kelly but was eliminated by eventual winner Bully Ray. The following night (which aired on tape delay on October 13), she lost to Kelly in a no disqualification match. On November 18, at Over Drive, Steelz teamed with Evans and fought The Death Dollz (Jessicka and Taya Valkyrie) for the Impact Knockouts World Tag Team Championship, but failed to win. On November 30, Impact confirmed that Steelz re-signed with the company. In January 2023, Steelz went for a short hiatus.

==== Return from hiatus (2023–2024) ====
On March 24, 2023, at Sacrifice, after Deonna Purrazzo defeated Gisele Shaw, Steelz returned from hiatus and attacked Jai Vidal and Savannah Evans, who accompanied Shaw to the match, turning face in the process. On the April 13 episode of Impact!, Steelz defeated Shaw in her first match since January.

On January 13, 2024, at Hard to Kill, Steelz would compete in an Ultimate X match to determine the number one contender for the TNA Knockouts World Championship. However, she was unsuccessful, as it was won by Gisele Shaw. Steelz began a brief feud with Xia Brookside after Hard to Kill, losing to her on the January 18 episode of TNA Impact!, but would get a win over her three weeks later. On the February 29 episode of TNA Impact!, a rubber match was set up where the winner will earn a TNA Knockouts World Championship match at Sacrifice, but the two brawled outside the ring and ended in a double countout. Knockouts World Champion Jordynne Grace would later appear on the entrance ramp, declaring that she would defend her title against both women in a three-way match at the event. At Sacrifice, Steelz failed to win the title when Grace pinned Brookside. Steelz appeared on the March 14 episode of TNA Impact!, saying she never lost to Grace at Sacrifice, and wanted a title shot next week. The following week, she got her title match, but failed to win.

==== The System and Mustafa Ali's Cabinet (2024–2026) ====
On September 13 at Victory Road, Masha Slamovich defended the TNA Knockouts World Tag Team Championship, alongside Steelz (who took the place of Alisha Edwards due to her not being medically able to compete) against Spitfire. They lost the match and the titles and after the match, Alisha and Steelz turned on Slamovich and attacked her, thus kicking Slamovich out of The System and Steelz joining as an associate. At the Countdown to Bound for Glory pre-show on October 26, Steelz competed in the Call Your Shot Gauntlet, being eliminated by Léi Ying Lee. On December 13 at Final Resolution, Steelz fought Slamovich for the TNA Knockouts World Championship in a Falls Count Anywhere match, but failed to win.

On the February 6, 2025 episode of Impact!, Steelz competed in a battle royal to determine the number one contender to Masha Slamovich's Knockouts World Championship, being eliminated first by former tag team partner Alisha Edwards. Later that night, she gets consoled by Mustafa Ali and follows him. The following week, Steelz joins Ali's Cabinet as his press secretary. She would eventually leave Ali's Cabinet on the October 1, 2026 edition of Impact! after ordering Special Agent 0 to attack Ali after their victory against Jason Hotch and John Skyler.

==== Fire 'N Flava reunion (2026–present) ====
On the October 22, 2026 edition of Impact, Steelz and Special Agent 0 would end their partnership, thus fully disbanding Order 4. That same episode, Steelz reunited with Fire 'N Flava with Kiera Hogan.

== Championships and accomplishments ==
- Battle Club Pro
  - BCP ICONS Championship (2 times)
- Chaotic Wrestling
  - Chaotic Wrestling Women's Championship (2 times)
- Impact Wrestling
  - Impact Knockouts World Championship (1 time)
  - Impact Knockouts Tag Team Championship (2 times) – with Kiera Hogan
  - Impact Knockouts Tag Team Championship Tournament (2020-21) – with Kiera Hogan
- Independent Wrestling Federation
  - IWF Women's Championship (1 time)
- Pennsylvania Premiere Wrestling
  - PPW Women's Championship (1 time, current)
- Pro Wrestling Illustrated
  - Ranked No. 11 of the top 150 female wrestlers in the PWI Women's 150 in 2022
- Synergy Pro Wrestling
  - Women's Garden State Invitational (2020)

== Personal life ==
Harris is of Puerto Rican descent.
