= TNA Knockouts World Tag Team Championship =

Women's professional wrestling championship

- The current championship belt

Details
- Promotion: Total Nonstop Action Wrestling
- Date established: August 20, 2009
- Current champions: Apex (Zoey Serrano and Shayna Baszler)
- Date won: October 11, 2026

Other names
- TNA Knockouts Tag Team Championship (2009–2013); Impact Knockouts Tag Team Championship (2020–2021); Impact Knockouts World Tag Team Championship (2021–2024); TNA Knockouts World Tag Team Championship (2024–present)
Statistics
- First champions: Sarita and Taylor Wilde
- Most reigns: As a tag team (3 reigns): Decay (Havok and Rosemary); As an individual (5 reigns): Rosemary
- Longest reign: Eric Young and ODB (478 days)
- Shortest reign: MK Ultra (Masha Slamovich and Killer Kelly) (2nd reign, 14 days)
- Oldest champion: Shayna Baszler (46 years)
- Youngest champion: Rosita (20 years, 76 days)
- Heaviest champion: The Death Dollz (Jessicka, Rosemary, and Taya Valkyrie) (559 lb (254 kg))
- Lightest champion: Mexican America (Rosita and Sarita) (226 lb (103 kg))

The TNA Knockouts World Tag Team Championship is a women's professional wrestling tag team championship owned by the professional wrestling promotion Total Nonstop Action Wrestling (TNA). It is contested for mainly by teams consisting of two female wrestlers in TNA, known as the TNA Knockouts; however, the championship was once held by a male. The current champions are Apex (Zoey Serrano and Shayna Baszler), who are in their first reign as a team and individually. They won the title by defeating Allie and Kiera Hogan at Bound for Glory on October 11, 2026.

The creation of the championship was announced on August 20, 2009, during a backstage segment on TNA's primary television program TNA Impact!. Like most professional wrestling championships, the title is won via the result of a scripted match. Sarita and Taylor Wilde were the inaugural champions. They won a four-week tournament to be crowned the first champions. The longest reigning champions were Eric Young and ODB, who held the titles for a record 478 days before the 2013 deactivation of the titles due to Eric Young being a male talent.

On October 24, 2020, at Bound For Glory, the revival of the titles were officially announced by Madison Rayne, with a tournament to award the revived championships taking place. On January 16, 2021, the tournament finals were won by Fire 'N Flava (Kiera Hogan and Tasha Steelz) at Hard To Kill.

== History ==
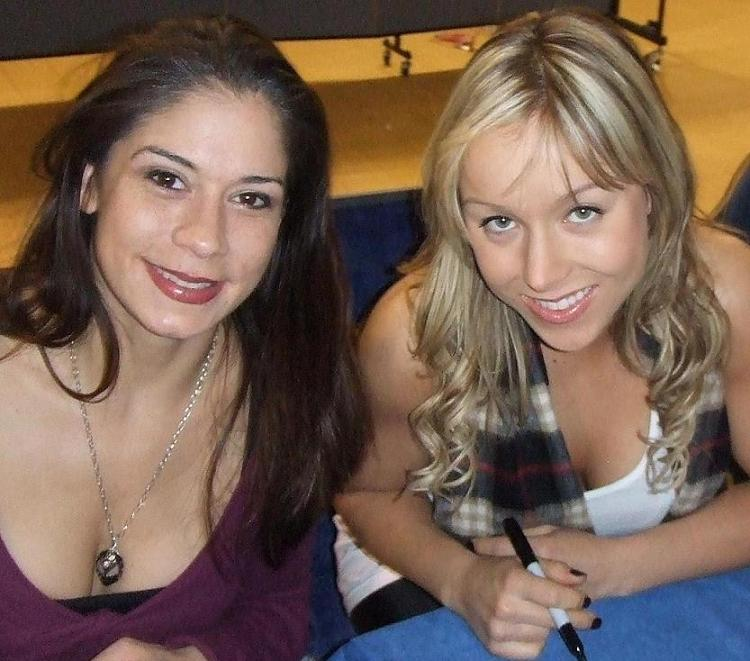
Inaugural champions Sarita and Taylor Wilde.

TNA Knockout (formerly Impact Knockout), or just Knockout for short, is the term used by TNA's Total Nonstop Action Wrestling (formerly Impact Wrestling) to refer to its onscreen female employees; this is similar to World Wrestling Entertainment and the Divas pseudonym they then used. In October 2007 at TNA's Bound for Glory PPV event, TNA established their first women's championship, with Gail Kim winning a 10 knockout gauntlet match to become the first TNA Women's Knockout Champion.

On the August 20, 2009 episode of Impact!, backstage interviewer Lauren, who was standing with and about to interview Christy Hemme, Tara, Taylor Wilde, and Sarita, announced that TNA were planning to host an eight-team single elimination tag team tournament to crown the first-ever TNA Knockouts Tag Team Champions. After a four-way match consisting of Hemme, Traci Brooks, Sarita, and Awesome Kong, TNA commentators Mike Tenay and Taz announced that the tournament would begin on the August 27 episode of Impact!. The first champions were crowned at No Surrender, where Sarita and Taylor Wilde defeated The Beautiful People.

During the first years of the title, it was vacated twice due to one half of the champions being released. On March 8, 2010, Awesome Kong left TNA after an incident with Bubba the Love Sponge. In December of that year, Hamada was released. On February 28, 2011, ODB and Eric Young defeated Gail Kim and Madison Rayne to win the titles. Young also became the only male to win the championship. They only defended the titles two times, but held the belts for 478 days. On the June 20, 2013 episode of Impact Wrestling, Knockouts Division Executive Brooke Hogan stripped ODB and Young of the title because Young is a male. This ultimately resulted in the titles being deactivated.

On October 24, 2020 at the Bound for Glory pay-per-view, Madison Rayne announced that after nearly eight years of inactivity, Impact Wrestling would revive the Knockouts Tag Team Championship. It was also announced that an eight-team tournament would take place over the next two months to determine the next champions. The brackets were announced in November, with the final taking place at the Hard To Kill pay-per-view on January 16, 2021. At the event, Fire 'N Flava (Kiera Hogan and Tasha Steelz) defeated Havok and Nevaeh in the tournament final to win the revived titles.

== Championship Tournaments ==
=== Inaugural championship tournament (2009) ===
Round One; TNA Impact! (August 18, 31 and September 1, 2009)
Awesome Kong and Raisha Saeed	Pin
The Main Event Mafia (Sharmell and Traci Brooks)	3:00
Sarita and Taylor Wilde	Pin
Alissa Flash and Daffney	5:00
The Beautiful People (Angelina Love and Velvet Sky)	Pin
Madison Rayne and Roxxi	3:00
Hamada and Sojournor Bolt	7:25
Christy Hemme and Tara	Pin

Round Two; TNA Impact! (September 1, 2009)
Awesome Kong and Raisha Saeed	3:00
Sarita and Taylor Wilde	Pin
The Beautiful People	Pin
Christy Hemme and Tara	4:00

Finals (No Surrender) (September 20, 2009)
Sarita and Taylor Wilde	Pin
The Beautiful People (Velvet Sky and Madison Rayne*)	5:00

* Madison Rayne had rejoined the Beautiful People and replaced Angelina Love due to her release prior to the finals.

=== Vacated championship tournament (2010) ===
On the December 9, 2010, edition of Impact! TNA vacated the TNA Knockouts Tag Team Championship, after one half of the previous champions, Hamada, had been released by the promotion, and set up a four–team tournament to determine new champions. The finals of the tournament would take place on the December 23 edition of Impact!.

Semifinals; TNA Impact! (December 6 and 7, 2010)
The Beautiful People (Angelina Love and Velvet Sky)	Pin
Daffney and Sarita	4:00
Madison Rayne and Tara	Pin
Mickie James and Miss Tessmacher	4:00

Finals; TNA Impact! (December 9, 2010)
Angelina Love and Winter*	Pin
Madison Rayne and Tara	5:00

* Winter replaced Velvet Sky, who had been attacked backstage by Sarita.

=== Revival tournament (2020–2021) ===
Round One; Impact! (November 17 and 24, December 1 and 8, 2020)
Alisha and Tenille Dashwood	6:32
Havok and Nevaeh	Pin
Killer Kelly and Renee Michelle	8:54
Jazz and Jordynne Grace	Pin
Fire 'N Flava (Kiera Hogan and Tasha Steelz)	Pin
Team Sea Stars (Ashley Vox and Delmi Exo)	7:10
Deonna Purrazzo and Kimber Lee	6:59
Rosemary and Taya Valkyrie	Pin

Round Two; Impact! (December 15, 2020 and January 5, 2021)
Havok and Nevaeh	Pin
Jazz and Jordynne Grace	8:48
Fire 'N Flava	Pin
Rosemary and Taya Valkyrie	7:58

Finals; Hard to Kill (January 16, 2021)
Havok and Nevaeh	9:40
Fire 'N Flava	Pin

== Championship belt designs ==
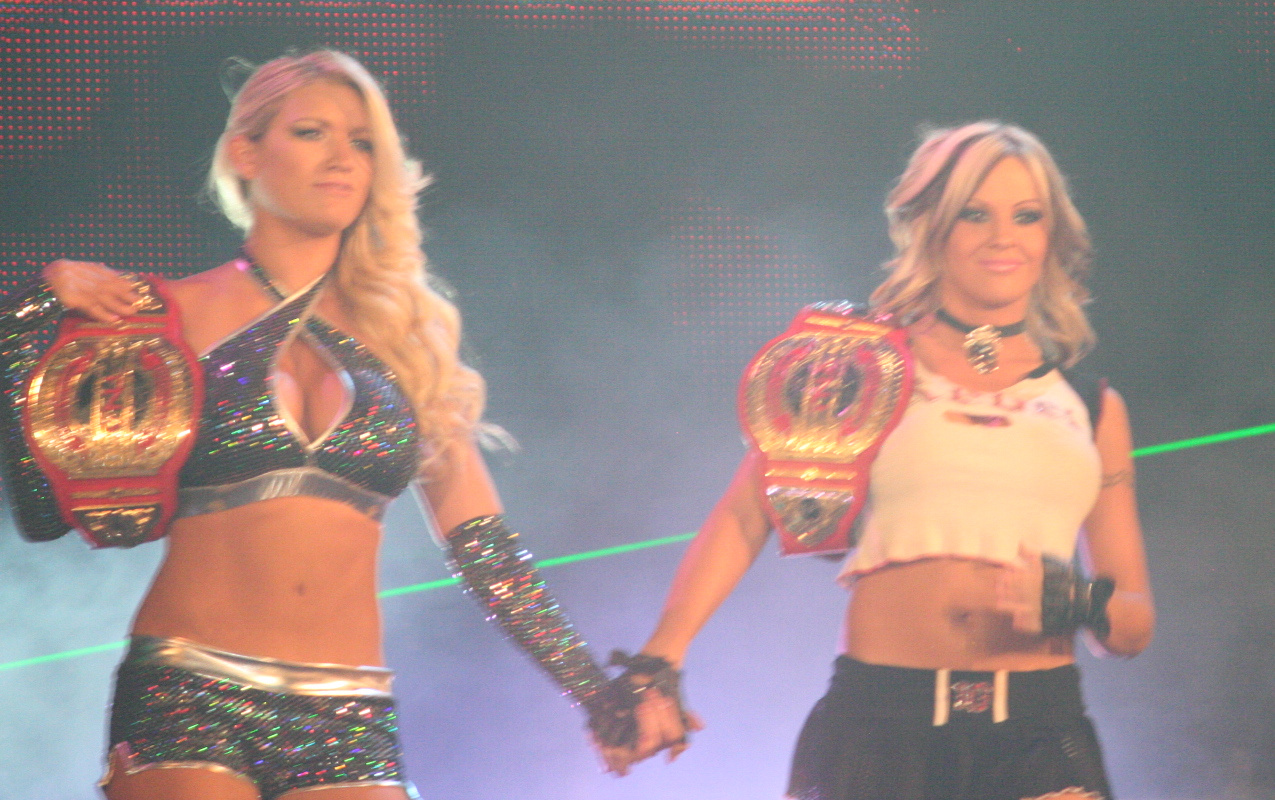
The original design of the Knockouts Tag Team Championships held by then champions The Beautiful People (Lacey Von Erich and Velvet Sky).

The 2020 design of the belts.

The original design of the Knockout Tag Team Championship from 2009 to 2013 has red leather, a gold center plates and two side plates with red and black designing and wording in the middle of the center of the gold middle plate that reads 'Knockouts Tag Team TNA Wrestling Champions' with red and silver diamonds in the middle and on the side plates as well as a globe on each of the side plates.

== Reigns ==
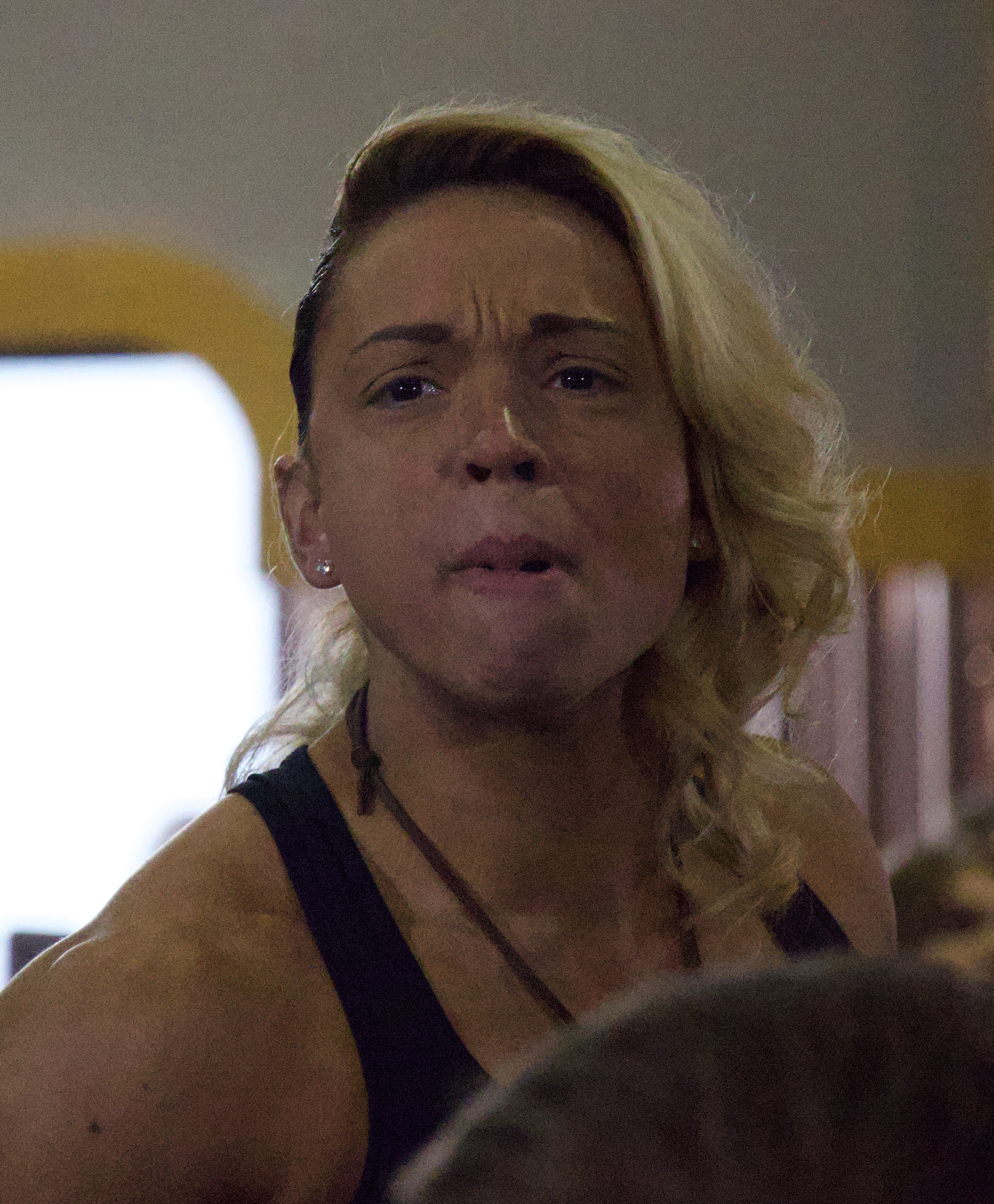
Current champions Apex (Zoey Serrano and Shayna Baszler)

Overall, there have been 30 reigns shared between 23 teams and 39 wrestlers. The inaugural champions were Sarita and Taylor Wilde, who defeated The Beautiful People (Madison Rayne and Velvet Sky) in the finals of an eight-team tournament to crown the first TNA Knockouts Tag Team Champions. At 478 days, Eric Young and ODB hold the record for the longest reign in the title's history. MK Ultra (Masha Slamovich and Killer Kelly)'s second reign holds the record for the shortest reign in the title's history at 14 days. Young is the first and only male wrestler to have held the title.

Apex (Zoey Serrano and Shayna Baszler) are the current champions in their first reign as a team and individually. They won the title by defeating Allie and Kiera Hogan at Bound for Glory on October 11, 2026, in Tampa, Florida.

== See also ==
- Women's World Tag Team Championship
