= Impact Wrestling United We Stand =

2019 Impact Wrestling pay-per-view event

United We Stand
- Promotional poster featuring various wrestlers that are performing at the event.
- Promotion: Impact Wrestling
- Date: April 4, 2019
- City: Rahway, New Jersey
- Venue: Rahway Recreation Center

Pay-per-view chronology
← Previous; Homecoming	Next → Rebellion

United We Stand was a professional wrestling internet pay-per-view (iPPV) event produced by Impact Wrestling that took place on April 4, 2019 in Rahway, New Jersey. It was the second event in the 2019 Impact Wrestling pay-per-view schedule. Wrestlers from Lucha Libre AAA Worldwide (AAA) and Lucha Underground – with whom Impact has partnerships with – as well as stars from Major League Wrestling (MLW), Dragon Gate, and Wrestle Pro also appeared on the card. The event was also streamed live on FITE TV.

The card had eight matches. The main event featured the "First-Ever" Confrontation between Impact World Tag Team Champions The Lucha Bros (Fénix and Pentagón Jr.) against Rob Van Dam and Sabu. Both the Impact Knockouts Championship and Impact X Division Championship were defended on the card, as Knockouts Champion Taya Valkyrie defended against Rosemary, Jordynne Grace and Katie Forbes while Rich Swann and AAA's Flamita wrestled for Swann's Impact X Division Championship. The event's undercard saw a six-man Ultimate X match for an X Division Championship match, Tessa Blanchard and Joey Ryan wrestling in an intergender match, and various other matches.

== Storylines ==
Other on-screen personnel
Commentators	Josh Mathews
Commentators	Don Callis
Ring announcer	Jeffery Scott
Referees	Brandon Tolle
Referees	John E. Bravo
Referees	Kris Levin
Referees	Harry Demerjian
Interviewer	Alicia Atout

The event featured professional wrestling matches that involve different wrestlers from pre-existing scripted feuds and storylines. Wrestlers portrayed villains, heroes, or less distinguishable characters in the scripted events that built tension and culminated in a wrestling match or series of matches. On February 22, 2019, Impact Wrestling announced the date for United We Stand. On the same day, three matches were announced for the event.

== Results ==
No.	Results	Stipulations	Times
1	Johnny Impact defeated Ace Austin, A. R. Fox, Jake Crist and Pat Buck	Ultimate X match to determine the #1 contender to the Impact X Division Championship	12:32
2	Team Lucha Underground (Aerostar, Daga, Drago and Marty The Moth Martínez) defeated Team Impact (Brian Cage, Eddie Edwards, Moose, and Tommy Dreamer)	Eight-man tag team match	11:01
3	Taya Valkyrie (c) defeated Jordynne Grace, Katie Forbes and Rosemary	Four-Way match for the Impact Knockouts Championship	8:59
4	The Latin American Xchange (Santana and Ortiz) (with Konnan) defeated Promociones Dorado (Low Ki and Ricky Martinez)	Tag team match	12:38
5	Tessa Blanchard defeated Joey Ryan	Intergender match	10:27
6	Rich Swann (c) defeated Flamita	Singles match for the Impact X Division Championship	7:46
7	Sami Callihan defeated Jimmy Havoc	Monster's Ball match	13:50
8	The Lucha Bros (Fénix and Pentagón Jr.) defeated Rob Van Dam and Sabu	Extreme Rules match	8:03
(c) / – the champion(s) heading into the match

== See also ==
- 2019 in professional wrestling
- List of Impact Wrestling pay-per-view events
