= Impact Wrestling Homecoming (2021) =

2021 Impact Wrestling event

Homecoming (2021)
- Promotional poster
- Promotion: Impact Wrestling
- Date: July 18–19, 2021 (aired July 31, 2021)
- City: Nashville, Tennessee
- Venue: Skyway Studios

Impact Plus Monthly Specials chronology
← Previous; Against All Odds	Next → Emergence

Homecoming chronology
← Previous; 2019	Next → —

The 2021 Homecoming was a professional wrestling event produced by Impact Wrestling. It was taped on July 18 and 19, 2021 and aired exclusively on Impact Plus on July 31, 2021. It was held at Skyway Studios in Nashville, Tennessee. It was the second event under the Homecoming chronology and the first to be held since the 2019 event.

10 matches were contested at the event. In the main event, Eddie Edwards defeated W. Morrissey in a hardcore match. In other prominent matches, Matthew Rehwoldt (who made his Impact debut at the event) and Deonna Purrazzo won the Homecoming tournament by defeating Decay (Crazzy Steve and Rosemary) in the final, and Josh Alexander defeated Black Taurus to retain the Impact X Division Championship.

== Production ==
On June 30, 2021, Impact Wrestling announced that they will be hosting tapings of Impact! on July 18 and July 19, 2021. These tapings also featured matches for the Homecoming event.

=== Storylines ===
The event featured professional wrestling matches that involved different wrestlers from pre-existing scripted feuds and storylines. Wrestlers portrayed heroes, villains, or less distinguishable characters in scripted events that built tension and culminated in a wrestling match or series of matches. Storylines were produced on Impact's weekly television program.

A key feature of the event was the Homecoming Tournament with Intergender tag team matches, featuring mixed tag teams competing to be crowned the Homecoming King and Queen. The following teams participated in the tournament:

- Matt Cardona and Chelsea Green
- Decay (Crazzy Steve and Rosemary)
- The Pump Family (Petey Williams and Jordynne Grace)
- The Road Warriors (Tommy Dreamer and Rachael Ellering)
- Brian Myers and Missy Hyatt
- Matthew Rehwoldt and Deonna Purrazzo
- Swinger's Palace (Hernandez and Alisha Edwards)
- Fallah 'N Flava (Fallah Bahh and Tasha Steelz)

On the July 1 episode of Impact!, Eddie Edwards was attacked in the parking lot by W. Morrissey before his match with Satoshi Kojima. This prompted Edwards to challenge Morrissey to a match at Slammiversary, which he lost after Morrissey hit Edwards with a chain-wrapped fist. On the next Impact!, Edwards and Morrissey brawled in the parking lot, resulting in the pair being matched up in a hardcore match at Homecoming.

== Results ==
No.	Results	Stipulations	Times
1	Matthew Rehwoldt and Deonna Purrazzo defeated Hernandez and Alisha Edwards (with Johnny Swinger) by pinfall	First round match in the Homecoming tournament	7:30
2	Matt Cardona and Chelsea Green defeated Petey Williams and Jordynne Grace by pinfall	First round match in the Homecoming tournament	10:22
3	Tommy Dreamer and Rachael Ellering defeated Brian Myers and Missy Hyatt (with Sam Beale) by pinfall	First round match in the Homecoming tournament	5:22
4	Decay (Crazzy Steve and Rosemary) defeated Fallah Bahh and Tasha Steelz by pinfall	First round match in the Homecoming tournament	9:14
5	Deaner (with Eric Young, Joe Doering, and Rhino) defeated Willie Mack (with Rich Swann) by pinfall	Singles match	9:42
6	Matthew Rehwoldt and Deonna Purrazzo defeated Matt Cardona and Chelsea Green by pinfall	Homecoming tournament semifinal	9:34
7	Decay (Crazzy Steve and Rosemary) defeated Tommy Dreamer and Rachael Ellering by pinfall	Homecoming tournament semifinal	10:59
8	Josh Alexander (c) defeated Black Taurus (with Havok) by pinfall	Singles match for the Impact X Division Championship	16:08
9	Matthew Rehwoldt and Deonna Purrazzo defeated Decay (Crazzy Steve and Rosemary) by pinfall	Homecoming tournament final	11:15
10	Eddie Edwards defeated W. Morrissey by pinfall	Hardcore match	18:34
(c) / – the champion(s) heading into the match

=== Homecoming Intergender Tag Team Tournament ===
First round
Swinger's Palace (Hernandez and Alisha Edwards)	Pin
Matthew Rehwoldt and Deonna Purrazzo	7:30
The Pump Family (Petey Williams and Jordynne Grace)	Pin
Matt Cardona and Chelsea Green	10:22
Decay (Crazzy Steve and Rosemary)	9:14
Fallah 'N Flava (Fallah Bahh and Tasha Steelz)	Pin
The Road Warriors (Tommy Dreamer and Rachael Ellering)	5:22
Brian Myers and Missy Hyatt	Pin

Semi-finals
Matthew Rehwoldt and Deonna Purrazzo	9:34
Matt Cardona and Chelsea Green	Pin
Decay	10:59
The Road Warriors	Pin

Final
Matthew Rehwoldt and Deonna Purrazzo	11:15
Decay	Pin
