= Impact Wrestling Homecoming =

Homecoming
- Promotions: Impact Wrestling
- First event: 2019
- Last event: 2021

Homecoming is a professional wrestling event held by Impact Wrestling. The first event was held in 2019 and saw the promotion's return to its initial home arena, The Asylum in Nashville, Tennessee, where Impact (then known as Total Nonstop Action Wrestling (TNA)) originally held weekly pay-per-view events from 2002 to 2004. The event would return in 2021 as a special that aired exclusively on the promotion's streaming service, Impact Plus, and was held at Skyway Studios, also located in Nashville.

== Events ==
#	Event	Date	City	Venue	Main Event	Ref
1	Homecoming (2019)	January 6, 2019	Nashville, Tennessee	The Asylum	Johnny Impact (c) vs. Brian Cage for the Impact World Championship	
2	Homecoming (2021)	July 31, 2021	Nashville, Tennessee	Skyway Studios	Eddie Edwards vs. W. Morrissey in a Hardcore match	
(c) - refers to the champion heading into the match
