= Impact Wrestling Homecoming (2019) =

2019 Impact Wrestling pay-per-view event

Homecoming (2019)
- Promotional poster featuring various Impact wrestlers
- Promotion: Impact Wrestling
- Date: January 6, 2019
- City: Nashville, Tennessee
- Venue: The Asylum

Pay-per-view chronology
← Previous; Bound for Glory	Next → United We Stand

Homecoming chronology
← Previous; First	Next → 2021

The 2019 Homecoming was a professional wrestling pay-per-view event produced by Impact Wrestling. It took place on January 6, 2019, at The Asylum in Nashville, Tennessee. It was the first event in the Homecoming chronology.

== Production ==
Other on-screen personnel
Commentators	Josh Mathews
Commentators	Don Callis
Ring announcer	Jeffery Scott
Referees	Brandon Tolle
Referees	John E. Bravo
Referees	Kris Levin
Referees	Harry Demerjian
Interviewer	Alicia Atout

=== Background ===
Total Nonstop Action Wrestling (TNA) produced weekly pay-per-view shows which operated as the company's main source of revenue, in place of monthly pay-per-view events used by other promotions. These shows took place mostly at the Tennessee State Fairground Sports Arena in Nashville, Tennessee, nicknamed the "TNA Asylum". The name "Homecoming" comes from their return to the Fairground for the first time since 2010.

=== Storylines ===
The event featured professional wrestling matches that involve different wrestlers from pre-existing scripted feuds and storylines. Wrestlers portrayed villains, heroes, or less distinguishable characters in the scripted events that built tension and culminated in a wrestling match or series of matches.

On the November 15, 2018 episode of Impact!, Brian Cage defeated Sami Callihan to retain the Impact X Division Championship. After the match, he announced that he would use his Option C privilege, voluntarily vacating the X Division Championship, to challenge Johnny Impact at Homecoming for the Impact World Championship.

== Results ==
No.	Results	Stipulations	Times
1	Rich Swann defeated Ethan Page, Jake Crist and Trey Miguel	Ultimate X match for the vacant Impact X Division Championship	13:40
2	Allie and Su Yung defeated Jordynne Grace and Kiera Hogan by technical submission	Tag team match	8:53
3	Eddie Edwards defeated Moose	Falls Count Anywhere match	13:20
4	Sami Callihan (with Dave Crist) defeated Willie Mack	Singles match	10:15
5	Eli Drake defeated Abyss	Monster's Ball match	12:15
6	The Latin American Xchange (Santana and Ortiz) (c) defeated The Lucha Bros (Fénix and Pentagón Jr.)	Tag team match for the Impact World Tag Team Championship	11:20
7	Taya Valkyrie defeated Tessa Blanchard (c)	Singles match for the Impact Knockouts Championship with Gail Kim as special guest referee	10:25
8	Johnny Impact (c) defeated Brian Cage	Singles match for the Impact World Championship; This was Cage's Option C World Title match	20:15
(c) / – the champion(s) heading into the match
