= Nashville Fairgrounds =

Entertainment complex in Nashville, Tennessee

- Interactive map of Nashville Fairgrounds
- Address: 401 Wingrove Street
- Location: Nashville, Tennessee
- Coordinates: 36.1310°N 86.7671°W
- Owner: City of Nashville
- Type: Convention center, Fairground

Construction
- Opened: 1891 (as Cumberland Park); 1922 (Tennessee State Fairgrounds Sports Arena); 1925 (Tennessee State Fairgrounds Coliseum); October 2019 (Nashville Fairgrounds Expo Center)
- Closed: 1970 (Tennessee State Fairgrounds Coliseum); 2019 (Tennessee State Fairgrounds Sports Arena)
- Demolished: 1970 (Tennessee State Fairgrounds Coliseum); 2020 (Tennessee State Fairgrounds Sports Arena)

Website
- Official website

The Nashville Fairgrounds, also known as The Fairgrounds Nashville and the Tennessee State Fairgrounds, is an entertainment complex in Nashville, Tennessee, United States. The 117-acre (47 ha) site is located southeast of Downtown Nashville on the Nolensville Pike. The historic home of the Tennessee State Fair, today the complex is home to Geodis Park, home of Nashville SC of Major League Soccer, Fairgrounds Speedway, the Tennessee State Fairground Sports Arena, the Nashville Flea Market, and The Nashville Fair. The site is undergoing redevelopment into a mixed-use development spurred by the construction of the soccer stadium with commercial and residential use and a community park. Additionally, there is a plan to renovate and upgrade the Fairgrounds Speedway to host NASCAR Cup, Xfinity and Truck Series events in conjunction with Speedway Motorsports.

== History ==
The fairgrounds originally opened in 1891 as a horse racing track named Cumberland Park. The park became the home of the Tennessee State Fair in 1906 and was purchased by the Davidson County government (later Metro) in 1910. At that state fair, on June 22, 1910, attendees witnessed the first night-time airplane flight. The plane was equipped with automobile headlights.

On September 20, 1965, a fire on the opening night of the fair destroyed four buildings and caused $10 million in damage.

The fairgrounds were re-branded as The Fairgrounds Nashville in 2015, in an attempt to lure more events.

== Sports Arena ==
The Tennessee State Fairground Sports Arena is on the grounds of the Nashville Fairgrounds. It is also known by the nickname the TNA Asylum due to the venue hosting Total Nonstop Action Wrestling events for two years in the early 2000s.

The building was constructed in 1922, by workers from South Dakota. The building was originally a flea market. It was operated throughout the 1960s and 1970s by promoter Nick Gulas as a professional wrestling venue.

After taping their initial shows in the Von Braun Center in Huntsville, Alabama, then moving their next few to the Nashville Municipal Auditorium in Nashville, Tennessee, TNA moved their weekly pay-per-view events to the Tennessee State Fairgrounds Sports Arena in July 2002. The name "TNA Asylum" was first used during the ninth weekly pay-per-view by Ron Killings. The Asylum also served as the home of TNA Xplosion, TNA's weekly syndicated television show, from its inception until October 2004.

After debuting TNA Impact!, which was taped at Soundstage 21 at Universal Studios Florida, TNA decided that they would eventually shut down their weekly pay-per-view operations in favor of switching to a monthly pay-per-view format. Shortly after, they held their final weekly pay-per-view event (on September 8, 2004) before permanently departing from the Asylum in favor of running their shows exclusively out of Universal Soundstage 21.

Showtime All-Star Wrestling used the arena a couple times during the year of 2009, taping some of their television episodes at the Sports Arena.

On October 6, 2009 it was announced that the Nashville Mayor Karl Dean would be closing down the Tennessee State Fairgrounds at the end of June 2010.

On November 12, 2010, TNA Wrestling returned to the Asylum for a one last live event, headlined by Jeff Hardy defending the TNA World Heavyweight Championship against D'Angelo Dinero, before the proposed demolition of the building. However, on January 18, 2011, the Nashville City Council voted to keep the arena open through 2012. The vote on a referendum issue on the ballot for the August 2011 Metro Nashville-Davidson County election made it much harder legally for the municipality either to dispose of or severely alter the operation of the Fairgrounds, and most of the facilities there remain in at least limited operation as of 2015.

On January 29, 2011, there was a "Tribute to the Fairgrounds" pro wrestling event, highlighting many of the Memphis-area wrestling legends who helped make the arena famous, with the main event being Jerry "The King" Lawler vs "Superstar" Bill Dundee in front of a sold-out crowd of 1,700.

Beginning in 2012, Crossfire Entertainment used the Sports Arena for their live events. They hosted "Tribute to the Fairgrounds" events before the proposed demolition, but later used it as a primary location for their shows. On August 4, 2012, Crossfire Wrestling announced TV production would return to the Nashville Fairgrounds Sports Arena, thanks to Paramount Pictures, as they were to be hosting HD/3D TV Tapings there. To add on to this, Crossfire was to be the first professional wrestling organization to be shot in 3D. On February 17, 2013, Crossfire Wrestling announced that they had to cease operations, leaving the venue empty for the time being.

On September 6, 2013, TCW Wrestling's "Tennessee Takeover" was held at the Sports Arena, which was the first event held in the arena since January 2013. On June 22, 2014, the first-ever live televised pay-per-view for Ring of Honor, Best in the World 2014, was held at the venue.

On October 21, 2018, the National Wrestling Alliance held its 70th-anniversary show in the building. Impact Wrestling returned to The Asylum on January 6, 2019 with a PPV event called Homecoming.

== New expo center and redevelopment ==
In 2009, Mayor Karl Dean announced the Metro government's intention to redevelop the fairgrounds into a mixed-use neighborhood, displacing the state fair amid financial struggles. Opposition to the closure prompted a citywide referendum in August 2011 that would amend the Metro charter to continue existing activities at the fairgrounds site. The amendment was passed by over 70 percent of voters.

In 2016, mayor Megan Barry proposed demolishing several buildings on the fairgrounds to make way for community parks and soccer fields. The plan, which also included a new soccer stadium for the new Nashville SC, was accused of displacing the fair although Metro Nashville maintains that there would still be adequate space for the fair. However, after not hosting the fair in 2020 due to the COVID-19 pandemic, it was announced in May 2021 that the fair would be moved to the Wilson County Fairgrounds in Lebanon, Tennessee, and held in conjunction with the Wilson County Fair in mid-August, earlier than the traditional September date.

In October 2019, a new exposition center which began construction in 2018 opened to the public. The new exposition center contains three expo halls and a show arena.

Impact Wrestling held their 20th anniversary edition of Slammiversary at the expo center on June 19, 2022. Jordynne Grace won the first ever Queen of the Mountain match to become Impact Knockouts World Champion for the second time in her career.

From July 29 to July 31, 2022 The venue hosted the Starrcast V wrestling convention along with various professional wrestling pay-per-view events including New Japan Pro Wrestling's (NJPW) Music City Mayhem, Game Changer Wrestling's The People vs. GCW, and Black Label Pro's (BLP) The Gang Crosses The Line throughout the weekend.
