= Rosemary (wrestler) =

Canadian professional wrestler (born 1983)

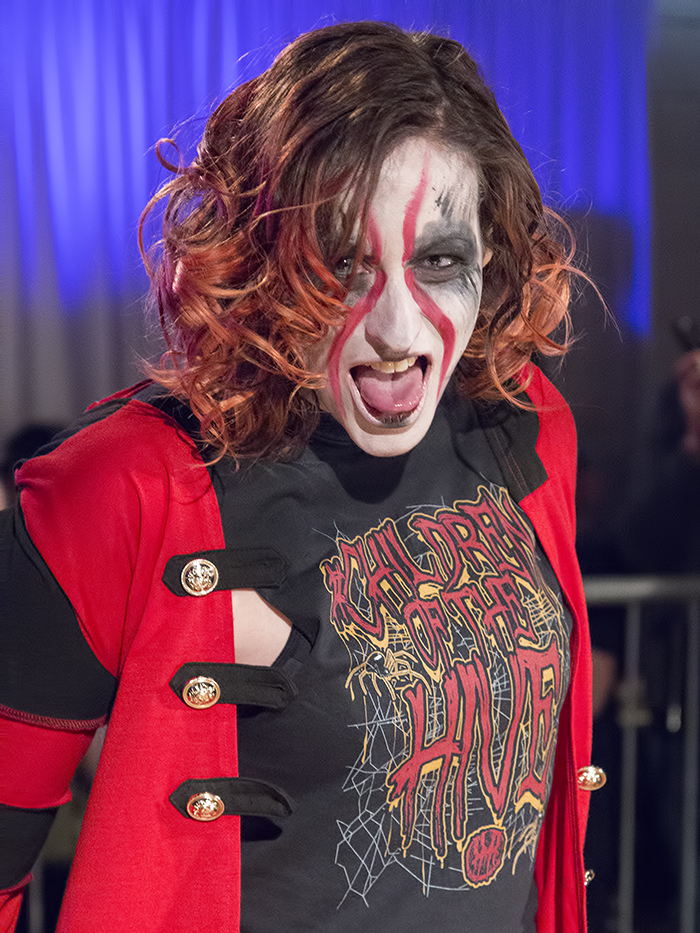
- Rosemary in 2018

Personal information
- Born: Holly Letkeman; November 29, 1983 (age 42) Winnipeg, Manitoba, Canada

Professional wrestling career
- Ring name(s): Casey Maguire; Courtney Rush; El Tigre Diablo; PJ Tyler; Rosemary
- Billed height: 5 ft 8 in (1.73 m)
- Billed weight: 150 lb (68 kg)
- Billed from: Winnipeg, Manitoba; The Valley of Shadows
- Trained by: Scott D'Amore; Tyson Dux; Johnny Devine
- Debut: January 30, 2008

Holly Letkeman (born November 29, 1983), better known by the ring name Rosemary, is a Canadian professional wrestler. She is signed to Total Nonstop Action Wrestling (TNA), where she is a member of DemonXBunny, alongside Allie. She is a record five-time TNA Knockouts World Tag Team Champion and also a former one-time TNA Knockouts Champion.

Rosemary has worked for promotions such as BSE Pro, Border City Wrestling (BCW), Maximum Pro Wrestling, NCW Femmes Fatales, Smash, Steel City Pro Wrestling, and Shimmer Women Athletes. She is also a former Shimmer Tag Team Champion with Sara Del Rey.

== Early life ==
Born in Winnipeg, Manitoba and raised in Stonewall, Manitoba, she was exposed to professional wrestling by her father. During high school, she and a friend briefly trained at a local school, but quit after one session when the school wanted them to have a match. She later attended University of Manitoba, where she majored in film studies. After graduation, she worked on a few film sets, but decided to resume her childhood interest in professional wrestling after hearing of Eddie Guerrero's death and attended Scott D'Amore's school in Windsor, Ontario, in May 2007, where she was taught by Tyson Dux and Johnny Devine, as well as D'Amore. She initially used the ring name PJ Tyler (reflecting her love of Aerosmith), but later changed it to Courtney Rush.

== Professional wrestling career ==
=== Early career (2008–2010) ===
Competing as Casey Maguire, she made her in-ring debut for PTW on January 30, 2008, in a losing effort against Haley Rogers. She was scheduled to take the position of Jennifer Blake as PWX Commissioner but her position was taken by "Danger Boy" Derek Wylde in a controversial way. She soon started a feud with Haley Rogers during a tag team with Jennifer Blake against the same Haley Rogers and Jade Chung. During this contest she broke Haley's nose, and she aggravated this injury during a single contest the following week. Those two athletes met different times during the 2008 and GLORY Wrestling dedicated them an article about the match that took place on September 12, 2008. During the first part of 2009 she competed in different matches with Cherry Bomb, Jennifer Blake and Holly Hilton, including a match with Amazing Kong that she was not able to win. On the day of her 26th birthday she was able to win her first title in career defeating Deanna Conda in the final of the WILD Tournament 2009 to win the GCW W.I.L.D. Championship.

=== NCW Femmes Fatales (2010–2013) ===
She debuted for NCW Femmes Fatales on February 6, 2010, as PJ Tyler. At the beginning she was scheduled to take on Kacey Diamond, but plans were changed, and she teamed with Mary Lee Rose to take on the team of Anna Minoushka and Anastasia Ivy. She was able to hit with her finishing maneuver, but the team of Anna and Anastasia got the win via pinfall. As the reigning WILD Champion at the time, Tyler was entered into the first ever NCW FF Tournament for the NCW Femmes Fatales Championship. In the first round she faced Portia Perez in a first time ever match but was unable to score the win. In October 2010, Tyler defeated Cat Power and Sassy Stephie in a triple threat match.

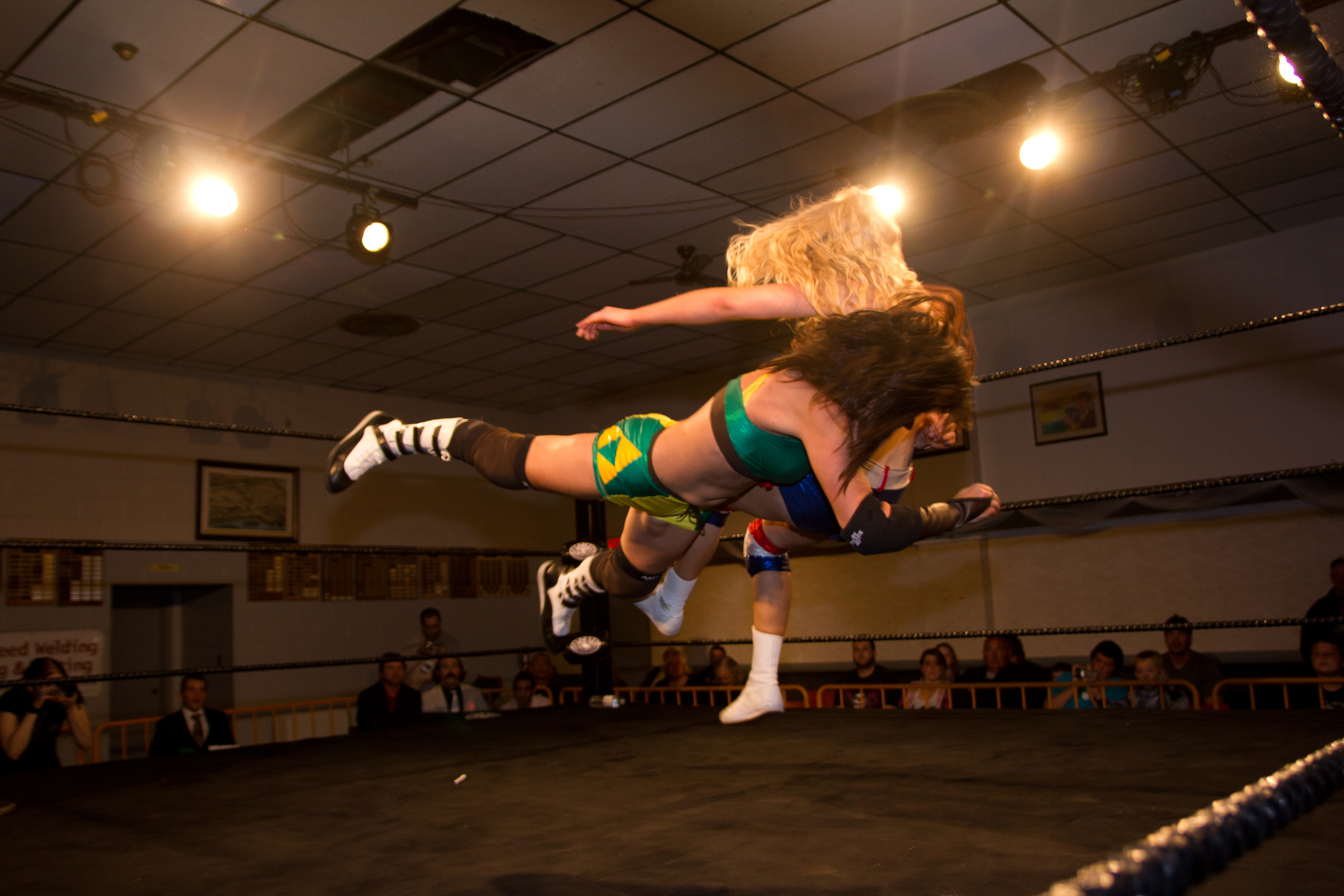
Courtney Rush (in green) executes a spear against Leah von Dutch, 2012

In March 2011, now appearing as Courtney Rush, she defeated Cat Power in a street-fight. At the July 2011 card, Rush faced Madison Eagles in the semi-main event but lost to her. In October 2011, she faced and defeated Kellie Skater.

In March 2013, Rush defeated Allison Danger to win the Bellatrix World Championship. On August 16, 2014, she won the nCw Femmes Fatales Championship.

=== Shimmer Women Athletes (2010–2016) ===
PJ Tyler was announced to debut for Shimmer on March 22, 2010, on the Shimmer Board. She made her first appearance for Shimmer Women Athletes as part of the Sparkle Division on April 10, 2010. During the Sparkle match she was defeated by Anna Minoushka. She made also a second appearance as part of the Sparkle the following day teaming with Leva Bates defeating the team of Anna Minoushka and She Nay Nay.

In March 2011, she faced Mena Libra, Daizee Haze and Kellie Skater as Courtney Rush as part of the main SHIMMER division but lost to all three. At the next set of tapings in October 2011, she faced Yumi Ohka, Nikki Roxx and Sara Del Rey, where Rush picked up a win against Roxx but lost to the other two wrestlers. After two wins on March 17, 2012, over Rhia O'Reilly and Sassy Stephie, on March 18, the babyface Rush formed a tag team with the villainous Sara Del Rey, first defeating Regeneration X, and then winning a four-way match to become the new Shimmer Tag Team Champions. On June 7, Rush and Del Rey lost the title to the Canadian NINJAs (Nicole Matthews and Portia Perez) at a Femmes Fatales event when Del Rey abandoned her during the match. On April 13, 2013, Rush defeated Athena, Madison Eagles and Saraya Knight in a four-way match to earn her first shot at the Shimmer Championship. Rush received her title match later that same day, but was defeated by the defending champion, Cheerleader Melissa.

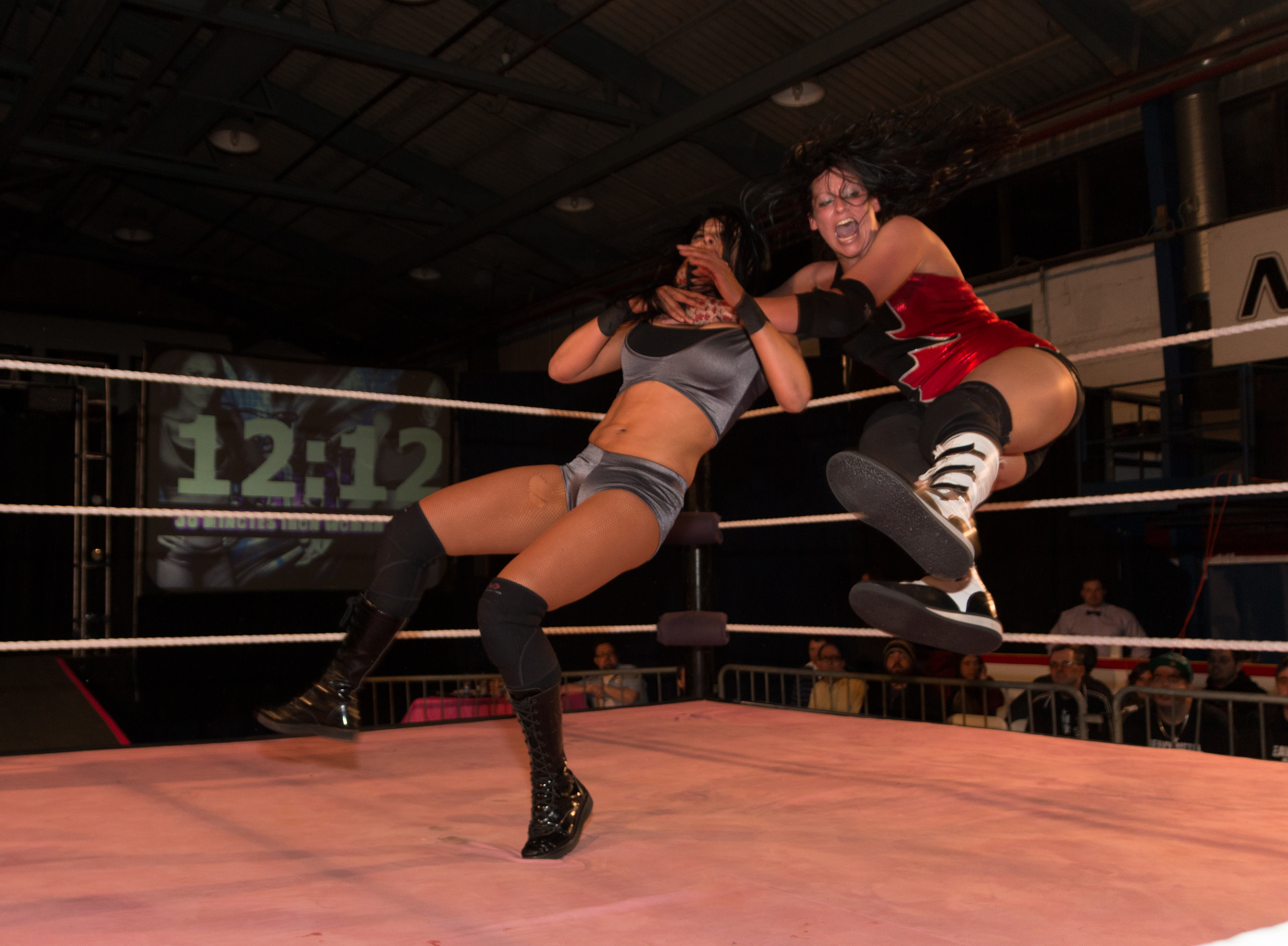
Rush (right) performing a clothesline on Cheerleader Melissa, 2014

Rush would suffer a fractured collarbone in September 2013, forcing her to miss SHIMMER's October 2013 shows, but she returned for Volume 62 in April 2014, where she lost to Mercedes Martinez.

Rush formed a tag team with Xandra Bale on April 11, 2015, referring to themselves as "Ontario's Top Team." They defeated Made In Sin (Allysin Kay and Taylor Made) at Volume 72, but they would fail to defeat The Kimber Bombs (Kimber Lee and Cherry Bomb) for the SHIMMER Tag Team Championship at Volume 73. After the match, she showed signs of a heel turn due to frustration with Bale. The following day at Volume 74, Rush and Bale were defeated by Team Slap Happy (Evie and Heidl Lovelace), and after the match ended, Rush turned heel and attacked Bale. She defeated Bale with the F5 later that day at Volume 75.

=== Total Nonstop Action Wrestling / Impact Wrestling ===
==== Knockouts Champion (2016–2017) ====
In January 2016, Letkeman signed a contract with Total Nonstop Action Wrestling. Her first appearance took place on the January 26 episode of Impact Wrestling, in which she appeared on stage, dressed as a macabre cheerleader, speaking in riddles while Crazzy Steve and Abyss attacked TNA Tag Team Champions The Wolves and stole their title belts, thus forming a heel stable called Decay. It was later revealed her new ring name was Rosemary. After making sporadic appearances throughout the year, mostly as a valet for Steve and Abyss, Rosemary made her in–ring debut on the April 26 episode of Impact Wrestling, defeating Gail Kim. Throughout September, Rosemary, as part of Decay, started a feud with Rebecca Hardy, which also led to a match between the two, that actually ended with a disqualification for Rosemary after spitting mist into the eyes of Hardy then putting Hardy through a table.

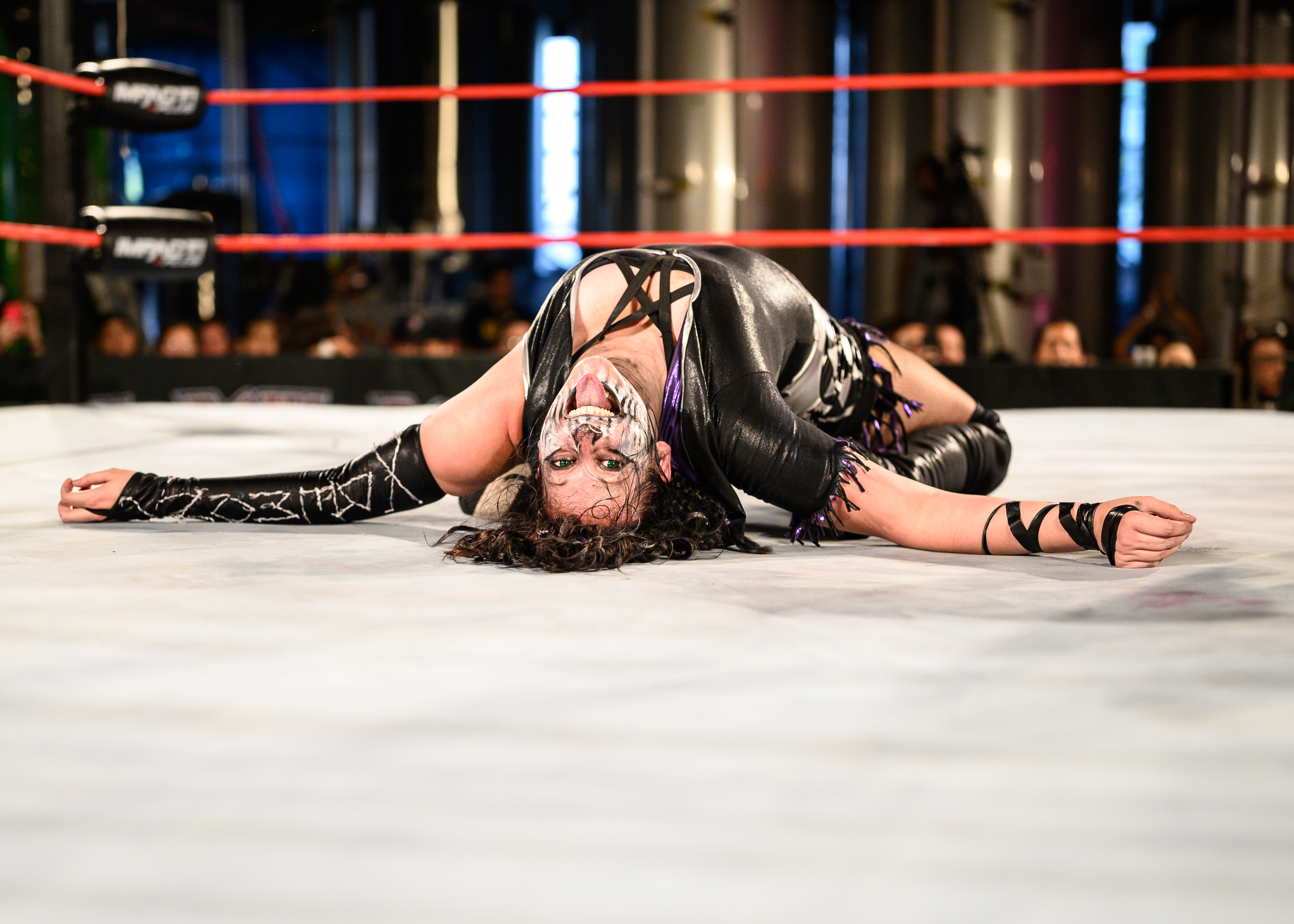
After she signed with TNA, Rush changed her gimmick to Rosemary

In November, Rosemary started a feud with both Gail Kim and Jade and after Kim was injured she vacated the TNA Women's Knockout Championship. This led to a match, which aired on tape delay on the December 1 episode of Impact Wrestling, where Rosemary defeated Jade in a six sides of steel cage match to win the vacant Knockouts Championship for the first time in her career. Month later, during the One Night Only: Live! pay–per–view, Rosemary made her first title defense defeating Sienna. In mid–January 2017, the feud between Rosemary and Jade re–emerged, and the two competed in a monster's ball match at Genesis, where Rosemary defeated Jade to retain her title. Few weeks later, on the March 2 episode of Impact Wrestling, Rosemary would go on to defeat Jade once again, this time in a last knockout standing match, to retain her championship and end their rivalry. During her reign, Rosemary also went on to fend off challengers like Santana Garrett and ODB.

In late–May, after she saved Allie from an attack by Laurel Van Ness and Sienna, and refused to join their stable, Rosemary turned face for the first time since joining the promotion. During the next few weeks, the kayfabe between Allie and Rosemary would continue, with the latter explaining that "The Hive" sent her to protect Allie. On July 2, at Slammiversary, Rosemary was defeated by Sienna, in what was a unification match for both the Impact Wrestling Knockouts and GFW Women's championships, ending her reign at 266 days — the third longest reign in the title's history.

==== Storylines with Su Yung and Taya Valkyrie (2017–2021) ====
On the September 7 episode of Impact Wrestling, after once again saving Allie from an attack, Rosemary was attacked by the debuting Taya Valkyrie. This sparked a feud between the two, and a match in which Rosemary was defeated by Valkyrie. The two were supposed to face off again, in a first blood match at Bound for Glory, on November 5, but the match was eventually cancelled due to unforeseen personal circumstances regarding Valkyrie. In December, Rosemary failed to regain the once again vacant Impact Wrestling Knockouts Championship as she was defeated by Laurel Van Ness in a tournament finals. On the March 1, 2018, episode of Impact Wrestling, Rosemary's rivalry with Taya Valkyrie was renewed after the latter returned and once again attacked Rosemary. Just a month later, on the April 12 episode of Impact Wrestling, in what was their second and final match, Rosemary defeated Valkyrie in a demon's dance match, officially ending their feud.

Shortly after her feud with Valkyrie had ended, Rosemary was placed in Allie's storyline with Su Yung, which eventually led to the burial of Rosemary, which was a way to write her off television due to a torn anterior cruciate ligament that she suffered working an independent promotion. On January 6, 2019, after an eight months absence off television, Rosemary returned at Homecoming as she saved Kiera Hogan from an attack by her former friend Allie and Su Yung. Shortly after her return, Rosemary (working as a face once again) continued her storyline with Allie, who had turned on Hogan and allied with Su Yung.

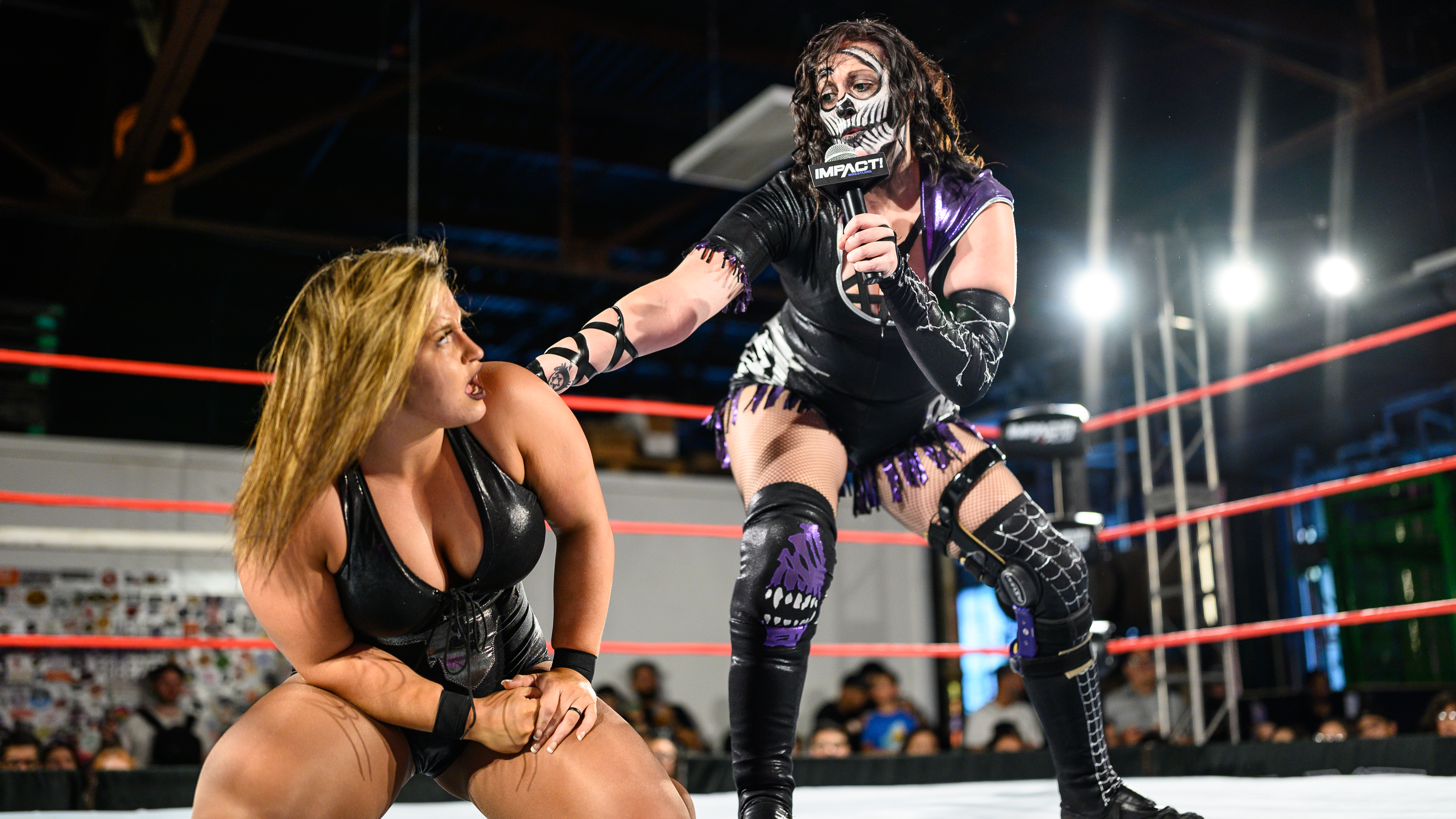
Rosemary (right) with Jordynne Grace in 2019.

On February 28, 2019, Impact Wrestling announced that Rosemary has re-signed a new two-year contract with the company. On March 29 at Against All Odds, Rosemary entered the Undead Realm to retrieve Allie's soul, but was unsuccessful as Allie was "killed" by Yung. On the May 17 episode of Impact!, Rosemary's rivalry with Yung reached to it climax when Rosemary defeated Yung in a Demon Collar match, draggin Yung with the collar afterwards. On the June 7 episode of Impact!, the returning Havok freed Yung, when she attacked Rosemary and Valkyrie during their match against each other. At Slammiversary XVII, Rosemary competed for the Knockouts Championship in a four-way Monster's Ball match against Havok, Valkyrie who was then-champion and Yung, as Valkyrie retained her title.

On the February 4, 2020, episode of Impact!, Rosemary challenged Yung, who changed her appearance and name to Susie. The two wrestled into a double count-out and continued to brawl backstage, when Rosemary wrapped a noose around Susie's neck and resurrecting Su Yung. On the March 24 episode of Impact!, when Havok and Yung were betrayed by their manager Father Mitchell when he sent them to the Undead Wasteland, Rosemary helped them to escape, ending her feud with Yung in the process, who would later return to her Susie persona.

After spending some time together on the short-lived recurring segment on Impact! called Wrestle House, Rosemary formed a team with her formal rival, Taya Valkyrie. The team competed in the tournament to crown new Knockouts Tag Team Champions, but lost in the second round to the eventual winners, Fire 'N Flava on the December 15, 2020, episode of Impact!. The two did not team together after the tournament loss and the team was officially disbanded when Valkyrie was released from Impact Wrestling on January 19, 2021.

==== Decay reunion (2021–2022); Knockouts Tag Team Title reigns (2021–2024) ====
On the January 12, 2021, episode of Impact!, Crazzy Steve prevented Kaleb with a K from interfering in his former ally Rosemary's match against Tenille Dashwood, which allowed Rosemary to win the match, thus marking a reunion of Decay. This led to Decay reuniting at the Hard To Kill pay-per-view and winning against Dashwood and Kaleb in an intergender tag team match. Black Taurus was introduced as the new member of Decay, where he teamed up with Rosemary and Steve at No Surrender as they faced Tenille Dashwood and XXXL (Acey Romero and Larry D) in a winning effort. Soon after Decay reunited, Rosemary began teaming with Havok a part of the group and they defeated Fire 'N Flava (Kiera Hogan and Tasha Steelz) at Slammiversary to win the Impact Knockouts Tag Team Championship. On October 23, at Bound for Glory, Decay lost their titles to the debuting team of The IInspiration (Cassie Lee and Jessica McKay), ending their reign at 98 days. On January 8, 2022, at Hard to Kill, Rosemary participated in the inaugural Knockouts Ultimate X match, which was won by Steelz. At Slammiversary, Rosemary teamed with Taya Valkyrie to defeat The Influence (Madison Rayne and Tenille Dashwood) to win the Impact Knockouts World Tag Team Championship. On August 12, 2022, during the tapings of Impact!, Rosemary and Valkyrie lost the titles to VXT (Chelsea Green and Deonna Purrazzo).

==== The Death Dollz (2022–2024) ====
In the autumn of 2022, Rosemary with Havok and Valkyrie, naming themselves as The Death Dollz. On October 7, at Bound for Glory, Rosemary went with Jessicka and Valkyire who defeated VXT to win the Knockouts World Tag Team Championship. The 3 would defend their titles under the Freebird Rule. In their reign, The Death Dollz defended their title against many contenders, such as Savannah Evans & Tasha Steelz, & The Hex (Allysin Kay & Marti Belle).

On February 26, 2023, during the tapings of Impact!, Rosemary with Taya Valkyrie defended the Knockouts World Tag Team Championship against The Coven (KiLynn King & Taylor Wilde) to which they lost, ending The Death Dollz's reign at 142 days. On April 16, at Rebellion, Havok & Rosemary challenged The Coven for their title, but were defeated. On May 25 show of Impact!, Rosemary returned to Impact Wrestling with her Courtney Rush persona and saved Jessicka from The Coven. Later in the show, it was revealed that The Death Dollz would face The Coven on the Countdown to Under Siege. On May 26, at Under Siege, The Death Dollz defeated The Coven in a non-title match.

On January 13, 2024 at Hard To Kill, Rush & Jessicka reverted back to Rosemary and Havok as Decay. They both later defeated MK Ultra to win the TNA Knockouts World Tag Team Championship for a third time, only to lose it back to them a month later at No Surrender.

==== Return to singles competition (2024–present) ====
After Havok would be injured at the hands of Ash by Elegance, Rosemary would return to singles action and focus her attention on getting revenge on Ash by Elegance by interfering in her matches against Jordynne Grace.

After starting a partnership with Wendy Choo, the two would go after Jordynne Grace and Rosemary would accompany Choo for her match against Jordynne Grace at Victory Road, where Choo was unsuccessful. The duo would then challenge Spitfire for the TNA Knockouts World Tag Team Championship at Bound for Glory, in which they would lose. Following this, Rosemary and Wendy Choo would end their partnership and faced each other in a No Disqualification match, where Rosemary would get the victory.

At Turning Point, Rosemary would defeat Savannah Evans and Xia Brookside. Later that night, she would interfere and set her sights on Jordynne Grace and Masha Slamovich. This would lead to a match between Grace and Rosemary at Final Resolution, which would end in a no contest, after interference from a returning Tessa Blanchard.

At Genesis, Rosemary would face Masha Slamovich in a Clockwork Orange House of Fun match for the TNA Knockouts World Championship, however, she was unsuccessful in winning the match.

=== Lucha Libre AAA Worldwide (2017) ===
On August 26, 2017, Rosemary worked in Lucha Libre AAA Worldwide's Triplemanía XXV working in a 4-way match for the AAA Reina de Reinas Championship. The match ended with Sexy Star submitting Rosemary for the win with an armbar, reportedly popping her arm out of its place legitimately in the process. The incident gained some attention among other wrestlers, who voiced their opinions on social media on the apparent shoot. As a result, AAA subsequently stripped Sexy Star of the win and championship.

=== WWE (2024) ===
Rosemary made her unannounced WWE debut on the August 27, 2024 episode of NXT where she was chosen by Wendy Choo to be a surprise opponent for NXT Women's North American Champion Kelani Jordan. On September 3, 2024, Rosemary was defeated by Tatum Paxley who then proceeded to attack Paxley after the match alongside Wendy Choo, however, both women were thwarted by Lyra Valkyria.

== Acting ==
Courtney Rush has also acted in several independent movies, including Monster Brawl (where she played Witch Bitch), Exit Humanity and Beat Down.

In 2018 Rosemary and Allie began the series Masters Of The Multiverse on YouTube.

=== Filmography ===
Year	Film	Role	Notes
2011	Monster Brawl	Witch Bitch	as Holly Letkeman
2011	Exit Humanity	Zombie	as Holly Letkeman
2012	Beat Down	French Kiss	as Holly Letkeman

== Championships and accomplishments ==
Championships

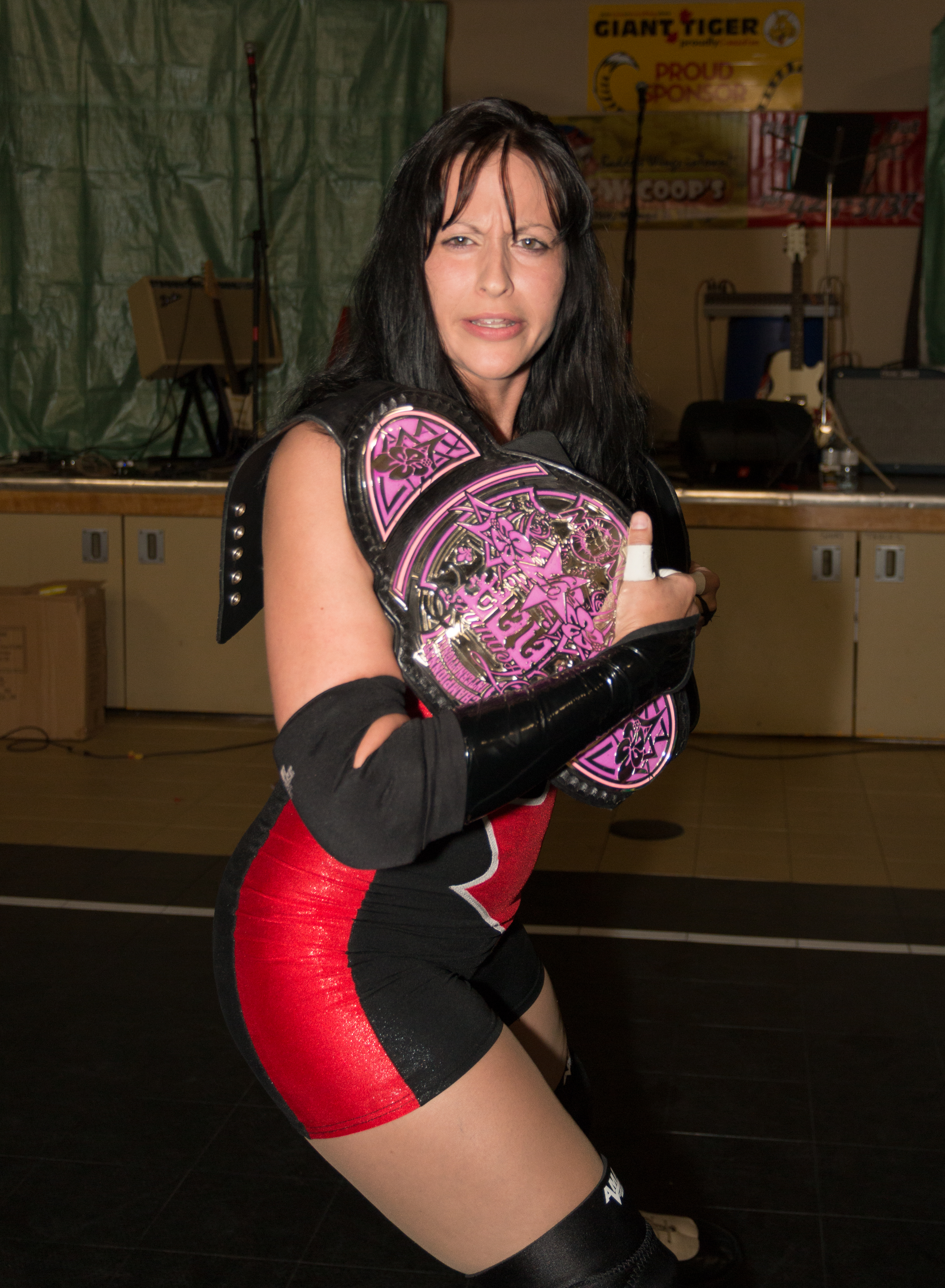
Courtney Rush posing with the nCw Femme Fatales championship belt post-match in 2014.

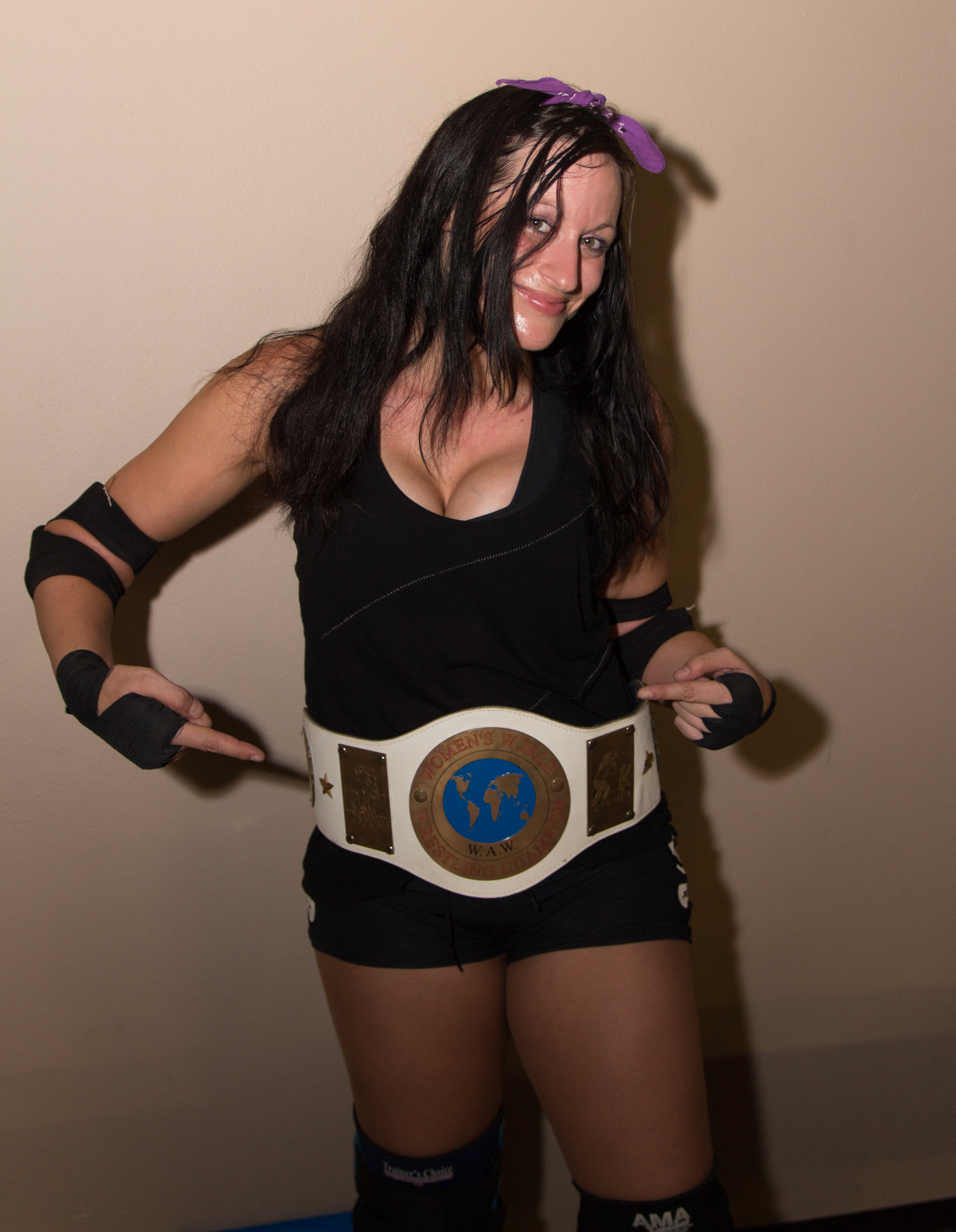
Rush during her reign as Bellatrix World champion

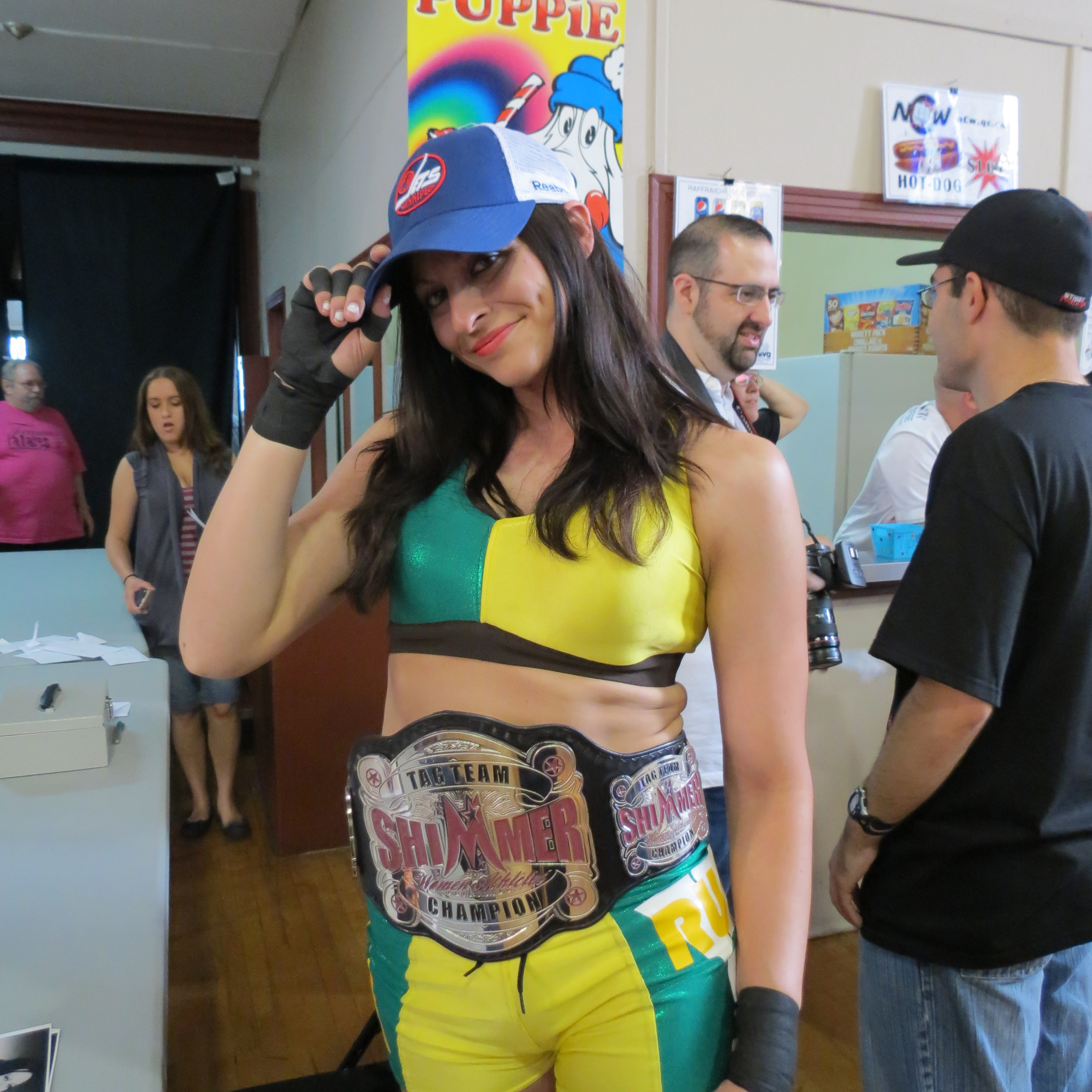
Rush as one half of the SHIMMER tag team champions

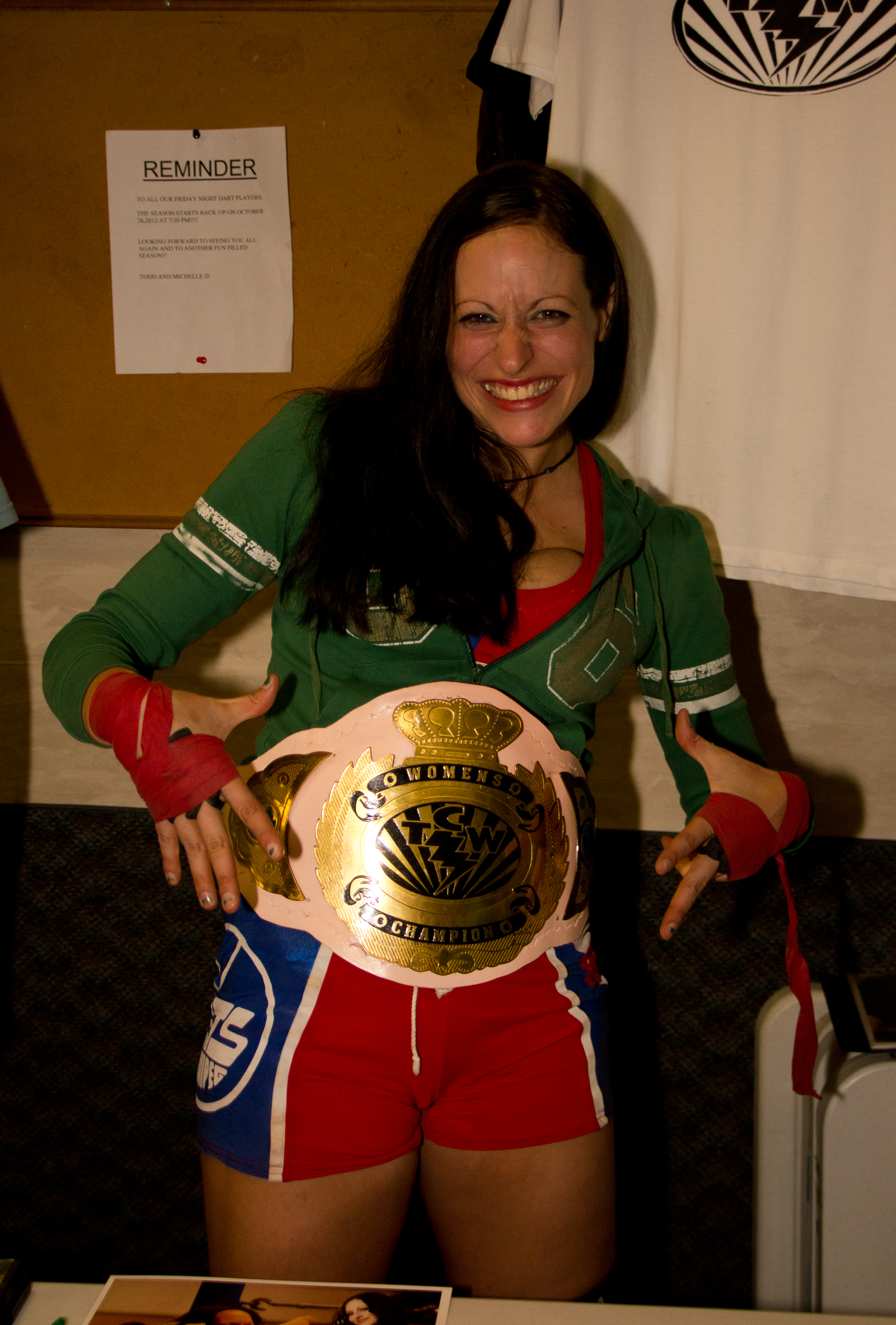
Rush as Tri-City Wrestling Women's Champion

- Acclaim Pro Wrestling
  - APW Tag Team Championship (1 time) – with KC Spinelli
  - APW Women's Championship (1 time)
- Atomic Revolutionary Wrestling
  - ARW Bombshells Championship (1 time)
- Bellatrix Female Warriors
  - Bellatrix World Championship (1 time)
- Great Canadian Wrestling
  - GCW W.I.L.D. Championship (1 time)
- nCw Femmes Fatales
  - nCw Femmes Fatales Champion (1 time)
- Pro Wrestling Illustrated
  - Ranked No. 8 of the top 50 female wrestlers in the PWI Female 50 in 2014
- Pure Wrestling Association
  - PWA Canadian Elite Women's Championship (1 time)
- Shimmer Women Athletes
  - Shimmer Tag Team Championship (1 time) – with Sara Del Rey
- Smash Wrestling
  - Smash Women's Championship (1 time)
- Total Nonstop Action Wrestling / Impact Wrestling
  - TNA Knockouts World Tag Team Championship (5 times) – with Havok (2), Taya Valkyrie (1), Jessicka and Taya Valkyrie (1) and Allie and Kiera Hogan (1)
  - Impact Wrestling Knockouts Championship (1 time)
  - Impact Year End Award (1 time)
    - Knockouts Tag Team of the Year (2022) with Jessicka and Taya Valkyrie
- Tri-City Wrestling
  - TCW Women's Championship (1 time, final)
