= Jordynne Grace =

American professional wrestler (born 1996)

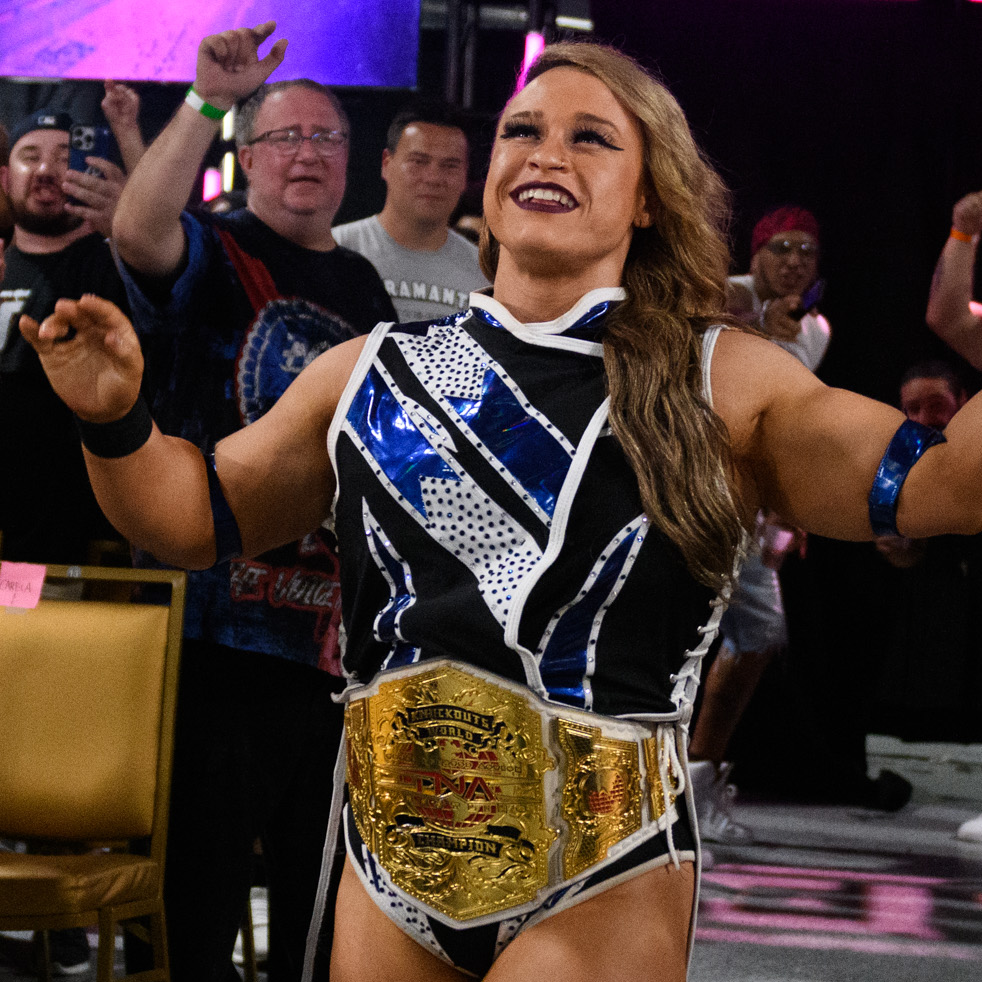
- Grace in 2024

Personal information
- Born: Patricia Forrest Parker; March 5, 1996 (age 30) Austin, Texas, U.S.
- Spouse: Jonathan Gresham (m. 2020)

Professional wrestling career
- Ring name: Jordynne Grace
- Billed height: 5 ft 3 in (160 cm)
- Billed weight: 150 lb (68 kg)
- Billed from: Austin, Texas
- Trained by: Mr. B Papa Don; George de la Isla
- Debut: September 22, 2012

Patricia Forrest Gresham (née Parker, born March 5, 1996), better known by her ring name Jordynne Grace, is an American professional wrestler, bodybuilder and powerlifter. She is signed to WWE, where she performs on the SmackDown brand.

Grace rose to prominence during her time in Total Nonstop Action Wrestling (TNA), where she is a three-time TNA Knockouts World Champion, one-time TNA Digital Media Champion (and the first woman to hold the title) and TNA Knockouts Tag Team Champion. Upon becoming the inaugural Digital Media Champion, Grace was recognized by TNA as the first Knockouts Triple Crown winner. She has previously also made appearances in Beyond Wrestling, Progress Wrestling, Pro-Wrestling: EVE, and Shine Wrestling.

As a powerlifter, Parker is the World Natural Powerlifting Federation (WNPF) Georgia State & National Records holder in the squat at 320 lb (150 kg), the bench press at 210 lb (95 kg) and the deadlift at 355 lb (161 kg) in the 165 lb weight class.

== Professional wrestling career ==
=== Independent circuit (2012–2018) ===
Patricia Forrest Parker made her professional wrestling debut on September 22, 2012, under the ring name Jordynne Grace. Throughout 2017 and 2018, Grace began tag teaming alongside LuFisto as "Team PAWG" in a number of independent promotions, primarily Beyond Wrestling.

At the All In event, on September 1, 2018, Grace participated in a 19-person over budget battle royale to determine the number one contender to the ROH World Championship, being the only female in the match. Grace was able to eliminate Brian Cage, but was ultimately eliminated by Bully Ray. On October 28, Grace unsuccessfully challenged Jazz for the NWA World Women's Championship on Women's Wrestling Revolution (WWR), as they main evented at the WWR's event WWR vs. The World.

=== Impact Wrestling / Total Nonstop Action Wrestling (2018–2025) ===
==== Early feuds (2018–2020) ====
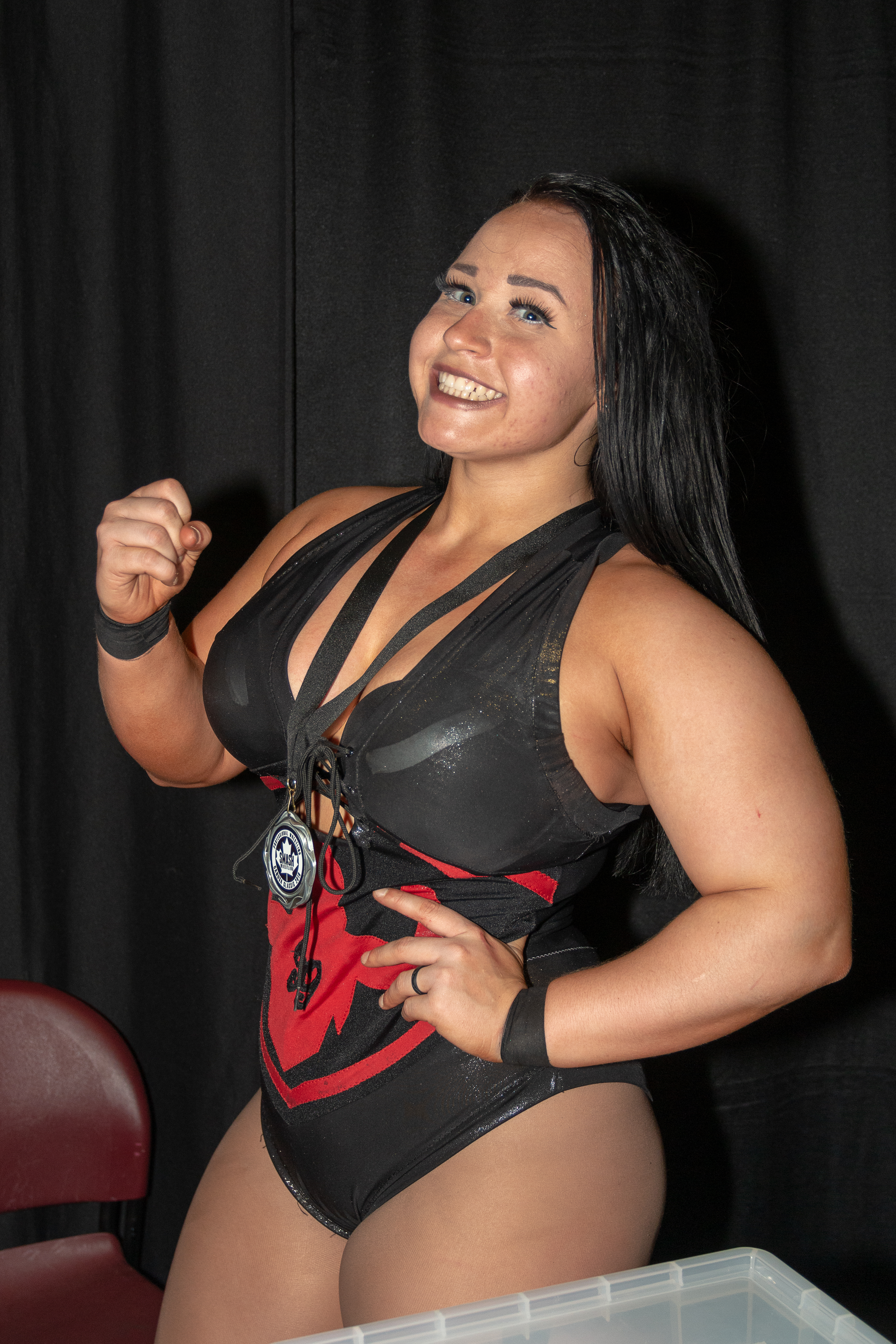
Grace in October 2018

On October 16, 2018, it was reported that Grace had signed a two-year deal with Impact Wrestling. Grace made her Impact! debut on the November 8 episode, as she defeated Katarina. On the January 3, 2019, episode of Impact!, Grace rescued Kiera Hogan as she was attacked by Allie and Su Yung. That led into a tag team match at Homecoming, which they lost as Yung technically submitted Hogan. With Rosemary's return to Impact, Grace teamed with her and Hogan to defeat Allie, Su Yung and The Undead Maid of Honor in the "Dark War".

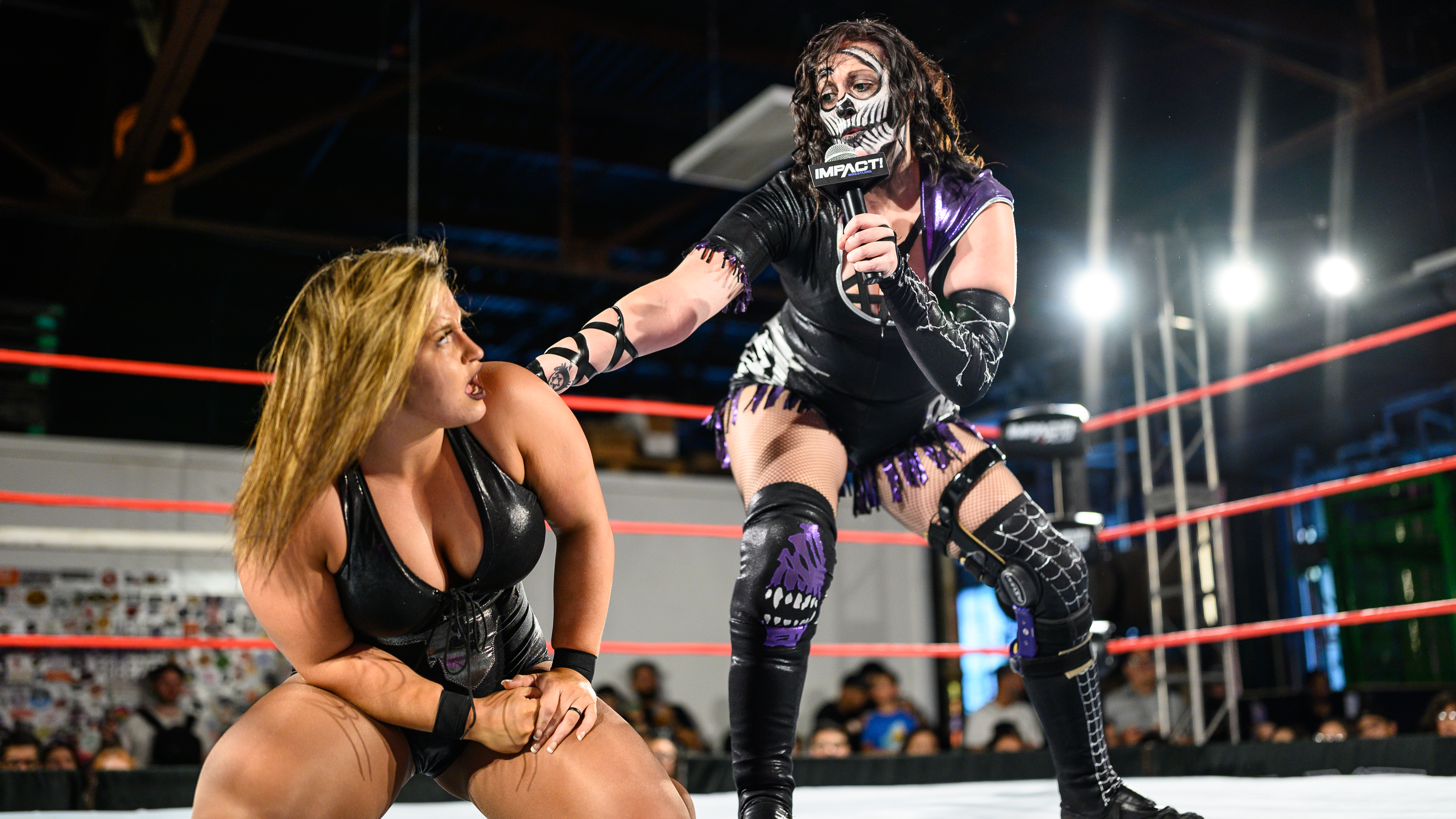
Jordynne Grace (left), with Rosemary in 2019

On the March 15 episode of Impact!, Grace defeated Tessa Blanchard to become the number one contender for Taya Valkyrie's Impact Knockouts Championship. At Against All Odds, which aired on March 29, Grace won by count-out, however, Valkyrie remained the champion as championship titles do not change hands by count-out or disqualification unless stipulated. On April 4, at United We Stand, Grace failed to win the title in a four-way match including Rosemary and Katie Forbes. On the April 9 episode of Impact!, she received another chance to become number one contender for Valkyrie's title by defeating Madison Rayne. On April 28, at Rebellion, Grace was defeated by Valkyrie, failing to win the title. On August 2, at Unbreakable, she teamed with Scott Steiner and Petey Williams to defeat Dicky Mayer, Gentleman Jervis and Ryan Taylor in a six-person tag team match. On October 20, at Bound for Glory, Grace competed in the Call Your Shot Gauntlet match, which was won by Eddie Edwards. On January 12, 2020, Grace had another opportunity for the Knockouts Championship at Hard To Kill against Taya Valkyrie and ODB, but Valkyrie retained when she covered ODB.

==== Championship reigns (2020–2022) ====
On January 18 (which aired on tape delay on February 11), she defeated Valkyrie to win the championship. After successfully retaining the title against Havok on February 22 at Sacrifice, Grace declared an open challenge with the Knockouts Championship on the line, which Madison Rayne answered by sending Miranda Alize and Lacey Ryan on the February 25 and March 10 episodes of Impact! respectively, but they failed to beat her. On July 18 at Slammiversary, Grace lost the title to Deonna Purrazzo, ending her reign at 182 days. A rematch was scheduled on August 25 during the second night of Impact's Emergence special, in the first Knockouts 30-minute Iron man match in Impact history, where Grace lost to Purrazzo, two falls to one.

Grace then entered into a rivalry with Tenille Dashwood when she returned on the September 1 episode of Impact!, interrupting her confrontation with Knockouts Champion Deonna Purrazzo during her Black Tie Affair. She lost their first match on the September 22 episode of Impact!, but won the rematch the following week, culminating in a final match and win by Dashwood on October 3 at Victory Road. On the October 6 episode of Impact!, Grace answered X Division Champion Rohit Raju's open challenge for the title and beat him, but he changed the rules so that it was not up for grabs. At Bound for Glory, she competed in a six-way intergender scramble match that involved Chris Bey, TJP, Willie Mack, Trey Miguel and Raju, who won to retain the X Division Championship. At Turning Point, she teamed up with Dashwood in a losing effort against Rosemary and Taya Valkyrie.

On the November 24 episode of Impact!, Grace revealed that her partner for the Impact Knockouts Tag Team Championship Tournament was former WWE Women's Champion and NWA World Women's Champion Jazz. The duo would debut as a team on the December 1 episode of Impact!, defeating Killer Kelly and Renee Michelle in the first round, but lose to Havok and Nevaeh in the second round on the January 5, 2021 episode of Impact!. Their lost led to a match at Genesis, where Grace defeated Jazz. On the February 23 episode of Impact!, Grace and Jazz defeated Kimber Lee and Susan to become number one contenders to the Knockouts Tag Team Championship, held by Fire 'N Flava (Kiera Hogan and Tasha Steelz). The two teams fought at Sacrifice, where Grace and Jazz failed to win the tag titles.

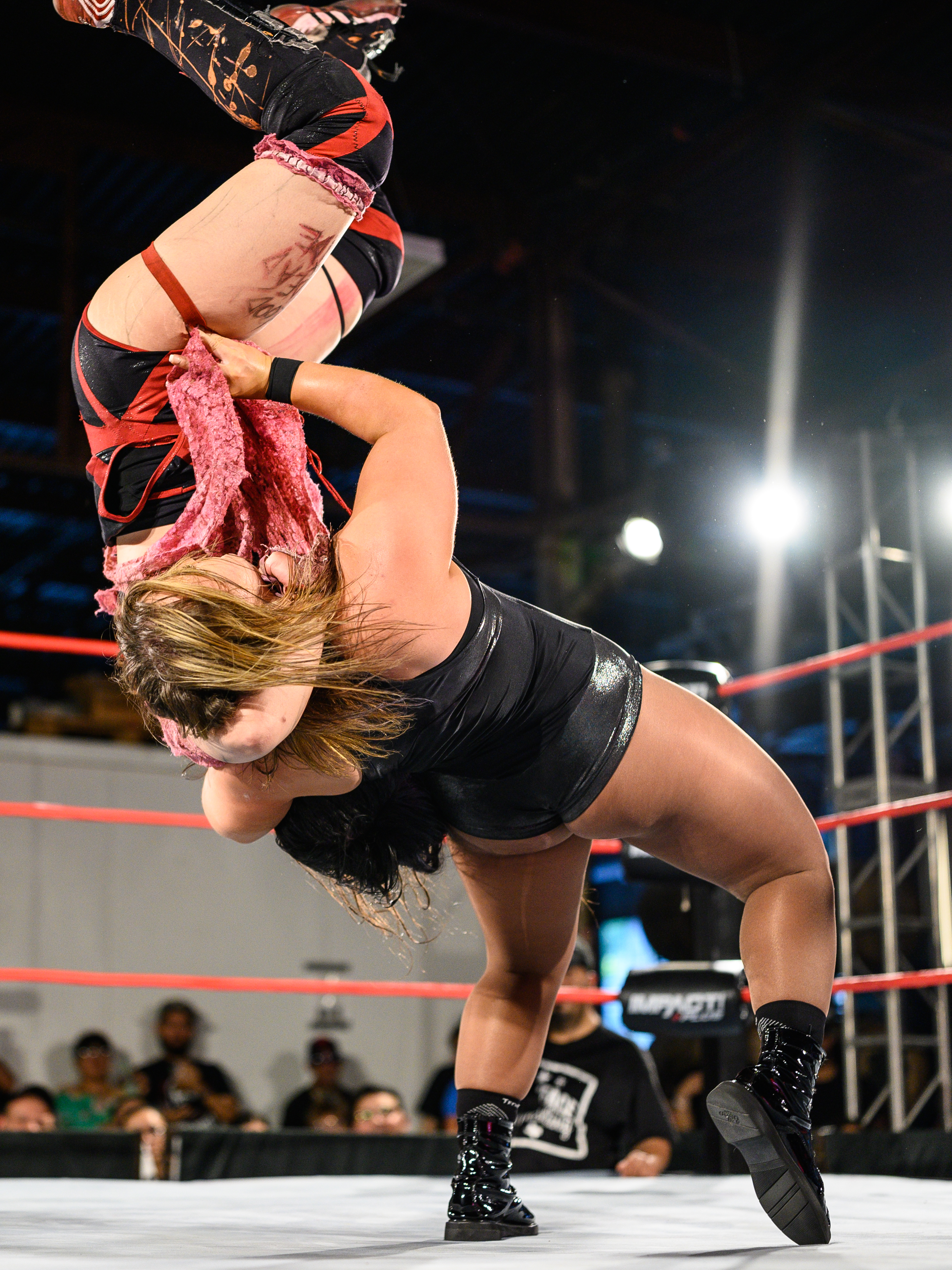
Jordynne Grace performing a fisherman suplex on Su Yung

At Hardcore Justice, she competed in a weapons match to determine the number one contender for the Knockouts title, which was won by Tenille Dashwood. On the April 15 episode of Impact!, Grace teamed with Jazz in her final match and beat Fire 'N Flava in an impromptu non-title bout after they interrupted her retirement ceremony. The following week, she defeated Hogan by disqualification and was beaten up by her and Steelz, before being saved by a debuting Rachael Ellering. Three days later, at Rebellion, Grace and Ellering defeated Fire 'N Flava to win the Knockouts Tag Team Championship for the first time. On May 7, Grace signed a new multi-year deal with Impact Wrestling. Eight days later, at Under Siege, she and Ellering dropped the titles back to Fire 'N Flava. On the May 20 episode of Impact!, Grace challenged Ellering to a match but failed to win. On the June 3 episode of Impact!, she and Ellering challenged Fire 'N Flava to a rematch for the Knockouts Tag Team Championship, but failed to regain them. Nine days later, at Against All Odds, Grace lost to Dashwood.

On July 31 at Homecoming, Grace teamed with Petey Williams to compete in a tournament to crown a Homecoming King and Queen, but lost to Matt Cardona and Chelsea Green in the first round. In October, Grace competed in the Shannon "Daffney" Spruill Memorial Monster's Ball match at Knockouts Knockdown, which was won by Savannah Evans. She then entered a tournament to determine the inaugural Impact Digital Media Champion, where she defeated Johnny Swinger in the first round. At Bound for Glory, Grace defeated Green, Crazzy Steve, Fallah Bahh, John Skyler, and Madison Rayne in the final to win the Impact Digital Media Championship. Having won the Digital Media title, Grace was then recognized by Impact Wrestling as the first Knockouts Triple Crown winner in the promotion's history.

On January 8, 2022, at Hard to Kill, Grace participated in the inaugural Knockouts Ultimate X match, which was won by Tasha Steelz. On the February 3 episode of Impact!, Grace lost the Impact Digital Media Championship to Matt Cardona after he hit her with a steel chair. At No Surrender, she fought Cardona in a title rematch, but lost by disqualification after delivering a low blow. On the February 24 episode of Impact!, Grace challenged for the title again in a Dotcombat match, but failed to win. On the March 31 episode of Impact!, she competed in a Knockouts World Championship #1 Contenders Battle Royal, which was won by Rosemary. At Multiverse of Matches, Grace competed in an Ultimate X match for the X Division Championship, which was won by Trey Miguel. On April 23 at Rebellion, she teamed with W. Morrissey in an Eight-Team Elimination Challenge for the Impact World Tag Team Championship, but were eliminated by The Major Players (Cardona and Brian Myers).

==== Triple Crown Champion, WWE appearances, and departure (2022–2025) ====
On June 19 at Slammiversary, Grace won the Knockouts World Championship for a second time in the inaugural Queen of the Mountain match. On July 1 at Against All Odds, Grace successfully defended the Knockouts World Championship against Tasha Steelz in a rematch. On July 31, at Ric Flair's Last Match event, Grace retained her title in a three-way match involving Deonna Purrazzo and Rachael Ellering. On August 12 at Emergence, Grace made another successful title defense against Mia Yim. On September 23 at Victory Road, she defeated Max the Impaler (Masha Slamovich's handpicked opponent) in a Pick Your Poison match. At Bound for Glory, Grace defeated Slamovich to retain her title, thus ending Slamovich's undefeated streak in Impact Wrestling. On the November 10 episode of Impact!, Grace made another successful title defense against Gisele Shaw, but was attacked by Slamovich afterwards. Eight days later, at Over Drive, Grace defeated Slamovich in a Last Knockout Standing match to retain her title.

On January 13, 2023, at Hard To Kill, Grace lost the Knockouts World Championship to Mickie James in a Title vs. Career match, ending her reign at 208 days. At Rebellion, Grace was defeated by Deonna Purrazzo for the vacated Impact Knockouts World Championship (defending champion Mickie James has vacated the title due to injury, with Purrazzo and Grace competing to become the new champion). On the April 27 episode of Impact!, Grace saved Purrazzo from Taylor Wilde and KiLynn King. On the May 11, 2023 episode of Impact!, Purrazzo and Grace challenged The Coven for their title, but were unsuccessful. Post-match, Purrazzo and Grace was attacked by The Coven until Trinity runs down to the ring and makes the save. On May 26 at Under Siege, Grace was unsuccessful at winning the title against Purrazzo. Since Grace lost, she can no longer challenge for the title as long as Purrazzo is champion. Grace ran out to assist Trinity and Purrazzo, who were being tripled-teamed by Giselle Shaw, Savannah Evans and Jai Vidal, only to be beaten down by the heels herself, during the June 1 episode of Impact!, which was taped on May 27. This would be Grace's final appearance for the promotion. Having expired in May, Grace opted not to renew her contract, and instead take an hiatus from wrestling to focus on outside projects.

On the August 31 episode of Impact!, Purazzo challenged Grace to a match at Victory Road. At the event, Grace defeated Purrazzo. On October 21 at Bound for Glory, Grace was one of participants in the Call Your Shot Gauntlet match. Grace won the match by defeating Bully Ray, becoming the first female to win that match and earning a championship match for any title she wanted. Grace issued a challenge for the Impact Knockouts World Championship at Hard To Kill in 2024. At the event, the first event under the newly rebranded Total Nonstop Action Wrestling, Grace defeated Trinity to win the newly renamed TNA Knockouts World Championship, winning the championship for the third time. On January 27, 2024, Grace made her surprise WWE debut as an entrant (at number 5) in the women's Royal Rumble match at Royal Rumble and squared off with her former TNA rival Naomi (known as Trinity in TNA), who made her WWE return in the match (as entrant number 2). Grace was eliminated by Bianca Belair. Grace is the second TNA wrestler and then-reigning TNA Knockouts World Champion to make her Royal Rumble match appearance after Mickie James in the 2022 event

On February 23, at No Surrender, Grace successfully defended her title against Gisele Shaw. On March 8 at Sacrifice, Grace successfully defended her title against both Tasha Steelz and Xia Brookside in a three-way match. On April 20 at Rebellion, Grace successfully defended her title against Steph De Lander. On May 3 at Under Siege, Grace and PCO defeated De Lander and Kon in a intergender tag team match.

On the May 18 episode of TNA Impact!, Grace successfully defended the TNA Knockouts World Championship against Marti Belle. After the match, Belle and Allysin Kay assaulted Grace. Grace then made a surprise appearance on the May 28 episode of WWE NXT, being revealed as the challenger for Roxanne Perez's NXT Women's Championship at NXT Battleground, but failed to win the title at the event after interference from Tatum Paxley and Ash by Elegance. At Against All Odds, Grace issued an open challenge for the TNA Knockouts World Championship. Tatum Paxley made her surprise debut in TNA to answer the challenge and Grace defeated Paxley to retain her title. On July 20 at Slammiversary, Grace successfully defended the TNA Knockouts World Championship against Ash by Elegance. On the September 10 episode of NXT, Grace issued an open challenge for the TNA Knockouts World Championship which was answered by Sol Ruca, which ended in a no-contest after Grace and Ruca were both taken out by Wendy Choo and Rosemary. At Victory Road on September 13, Grace successfully defended the TNA Knockouts World Championship against Wendy Choo. At Bound for Glory on October 26, Grace lost the Knockouts World Championship to Masha Slamovich, ending her reign at 287 days.

On November 6 at NXT 2300, Grace was on the winning side of a 10-woman tag team match. On November 29 at Turning Point, Grace failed to regain the TNA Knockouts World Championship against Slamovich in a two out of three falls match. Grace faced off against Rosemary at Final Resolution, which ended in a no-contest after Grace was attacked by a returning Tessa Blanchard. On January 19, 2025, Grace took on Blanchard at Genesis in a losing effort, which would end up being her final appearance in TNA. After the match, it was confirmed that Grace had left the company after seven years.

=== WWE (2025–present) ===
On January 27, 2025, it was reported that Grace had signed with WWE. Grace entered the women's Royal Rumble match on February 1 at #19, eliminating Jaida Parker before being eliminated by Giulia. At NXT Vengeance Day, Grace made an appearance after the main event, in which Giulia successfully retained the NXT Women's Championship, signalling that Grace will be part of the NXT brand. At NXT Stand & Deliver on April 19, Grace unsuccessfully challenged Stephanie Vaquer for the NXT Women's Championship in a fatal four-way match also involving Giulia and Parker, the latter of whom Vaquer pinned. On the May 6 episode of NXT, Grace defeated Giulia in a #1 contender's match for the NXT Women's Championship. She went on to face Vaquer at NXT Battleground but lost the title match. At Evolution on July 13, Grace failed to win the NXT Women's Championship from new champion Jacy Jayne after Blake Monroe, who had just debut in NXT and allied with Grace against Jayne and Fatal Influence, turned on Grace during the match. The pair traded victories, where Monroe defeated Grace at NXT Heatwave on August 24 whereas Grace defeated Monroe in a Weaponized Steel Cage match at NXT No Mercy on September 27 to end their feud.

On January 9, 2026, Grace officially debuted on the main roster by signing with the SmackDown brand. Shortly after, she suffered an ankle injury during her Main Event match against Alba Fyre. Grace returned from injury on the April 17 episode of SmackDown, where she lost to Tiffany Stratton in a Women's United States Championship #1 contender's match.

== Personal life ==
On December 21, 2018, Parker became engaged to fellow professional wrestler Jonathan Gresham. The couple married in September 2020.

== Filmography ==
Year	Title	Role	Notes
2023	Heels	Dystopia Wrestler	Episode: “Who the Hell Is The Condamned?” (uncredited)
2026	Welcome to Paradise	Lisa (Jacked Wrestling Demon Form)	

== Championships and accomplishments ==
=== Powerlifting ===
- Federation Records
  - World Natural Powerlifting Federation (WNPF) Records
    - Current WNPF Georgia State and National Record holder in the squat at 320 lb (150 kg), the bench press at 210 lb (95 kg) and the deadlift at 355 lb (161 kg) in the 165 lb. weight class.

=== Professional wrestling ===
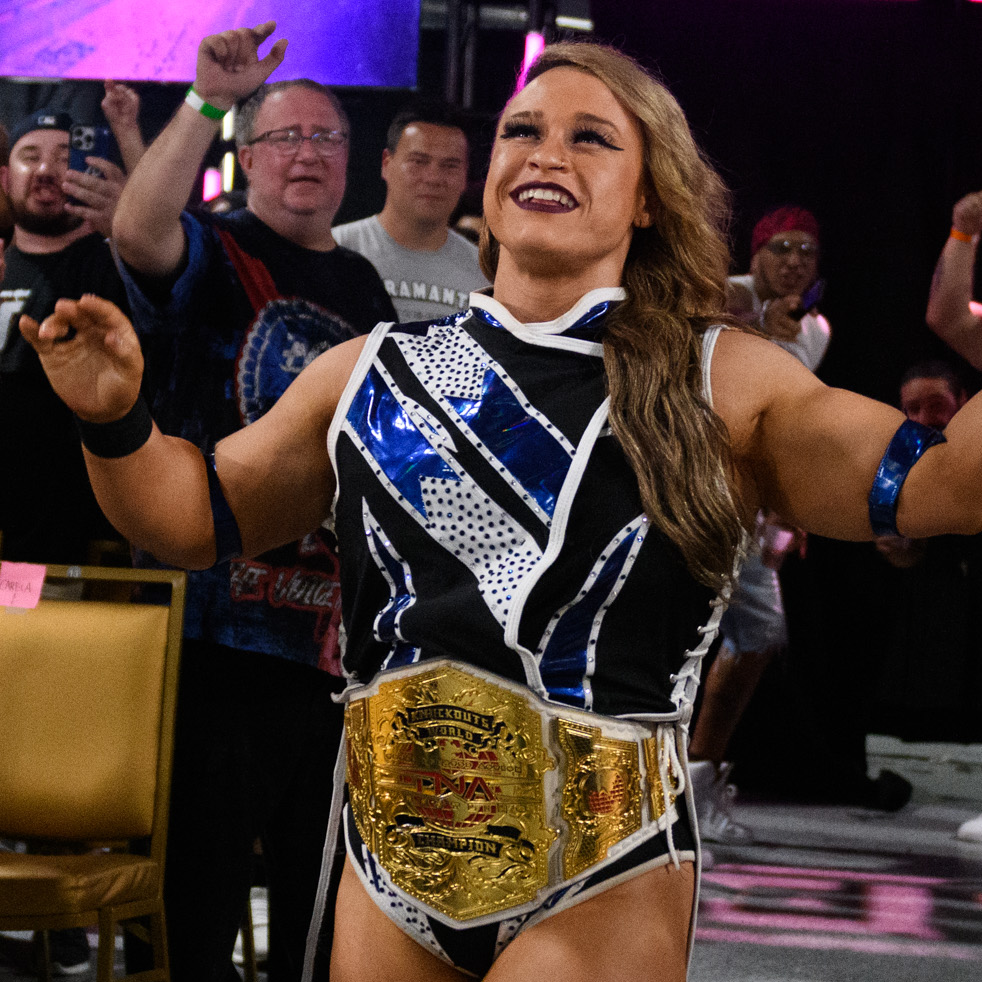
Grace is a three-time Impact/TNA Knockouts World Champion

- Battle Club Pro
  - BCP ICONS Championship (1 time)
- Black Label Pro
  - BLP Heavyweight Championship (1 time)
- ESPN
  - Ranked No. 24 of the 30 best Pro Wrestlers Under 30 in 2023
- Impact Wrestling / Total Nonstop Action Wrestling
  - TNA Knockouts World Championship (3 times)
  - Impact Digital Media Championship (1 time, inaugural)
  - Impact Knockouts Tag Team Championship (1 time) – with Rachael Ellering
  - Impact Digital Media Championship Tournament (2021)
  - First Knockouts Triple Crown winner
  - Call Your Shot Gauntlet (2023)
  - Queen of the Mountain (2022)
  - TNA Year End Awards (4 times)
    - Knockouts Tag Team of the Year (2021) – with Rachael Ellering
    - Knockout of the Year (2022, 2024)
    - Match of the Year (2024 – vs. Masha Slamovich at Bound for Glory)
- Lancaster Championship Wrestling
  - LCW Vixen Championship (1 time)
- Lucha Libre AAA Worldwide
  - Lucha Libre World Cup: 2023 Women's division – with Deonna Purrazzo and Kamille
- NOVA Pro Wrestling
  - Women's Commonwealth Cup (2018)
- Progress Wrestling
  - Progress World Women's Championship (1 time)
  - Revelations of Divine Love Tournament (2019)
- Pro Wrestling Illustrated
  - Ranked No. 6 of the top 150 female wrestlers in the PWI Women's 150 in 2022
  - Ranked No. 97 of the top 500 singles wrestlers in the PWI 500 in 2022
  - Ranked No. 2 of the top 250 women's wrestlers in the PWI Women's 250 in 2024
- Pro Wrestling Magic
  - PWM Women's Championship (1 time)
- Sports Illustrated
  - Ranked No. 9 of the top 10 women's wrestlers in 2019
- Universal Independent Wrestling
  - LOUIS Ladies Tag Team Championships (1 time) – with Nina Monet
- Women Superstars Uncensored
  - WSU Spirit Championship (1 time)
- Women's Wrestling Revolution
  - Tournament For Tomorrow (2017)
- World Series Wrestling
  - WSW Women's Championship (2 times, inaugural)
- Women's Wrestling Hall of Fame
  - WWHOF Award (1 time)
    - Most Improved Wrestler of the Year (2023)
- Zelo Pro Wrestling
  - Zelo Pro Women's Championship (1 time)

== Luchas de Apuestas record ==
Winner (wager)	Loser (wager)	Location	Event	Date	Notes
Mickie James (career)	Jordynne Grace (title)	Atlanta, Georgia	Hard to Kill	January 13, 2023	
